= Zenica =

City in Bosnia and Herzegovina

Zenica Зеница
- City
- Grad Zenica; Град Зеница; City of Zenica
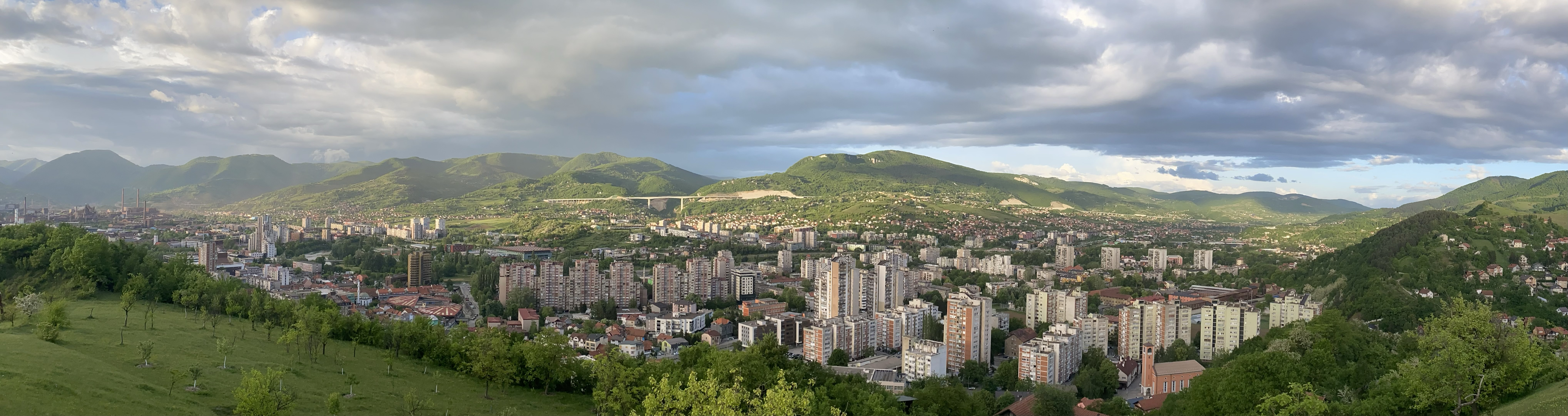
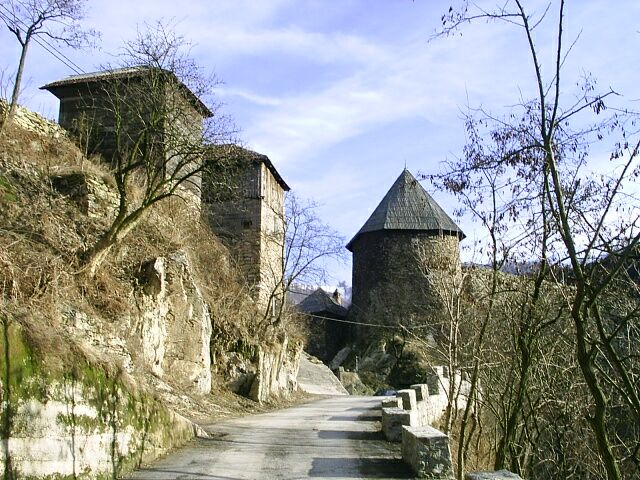
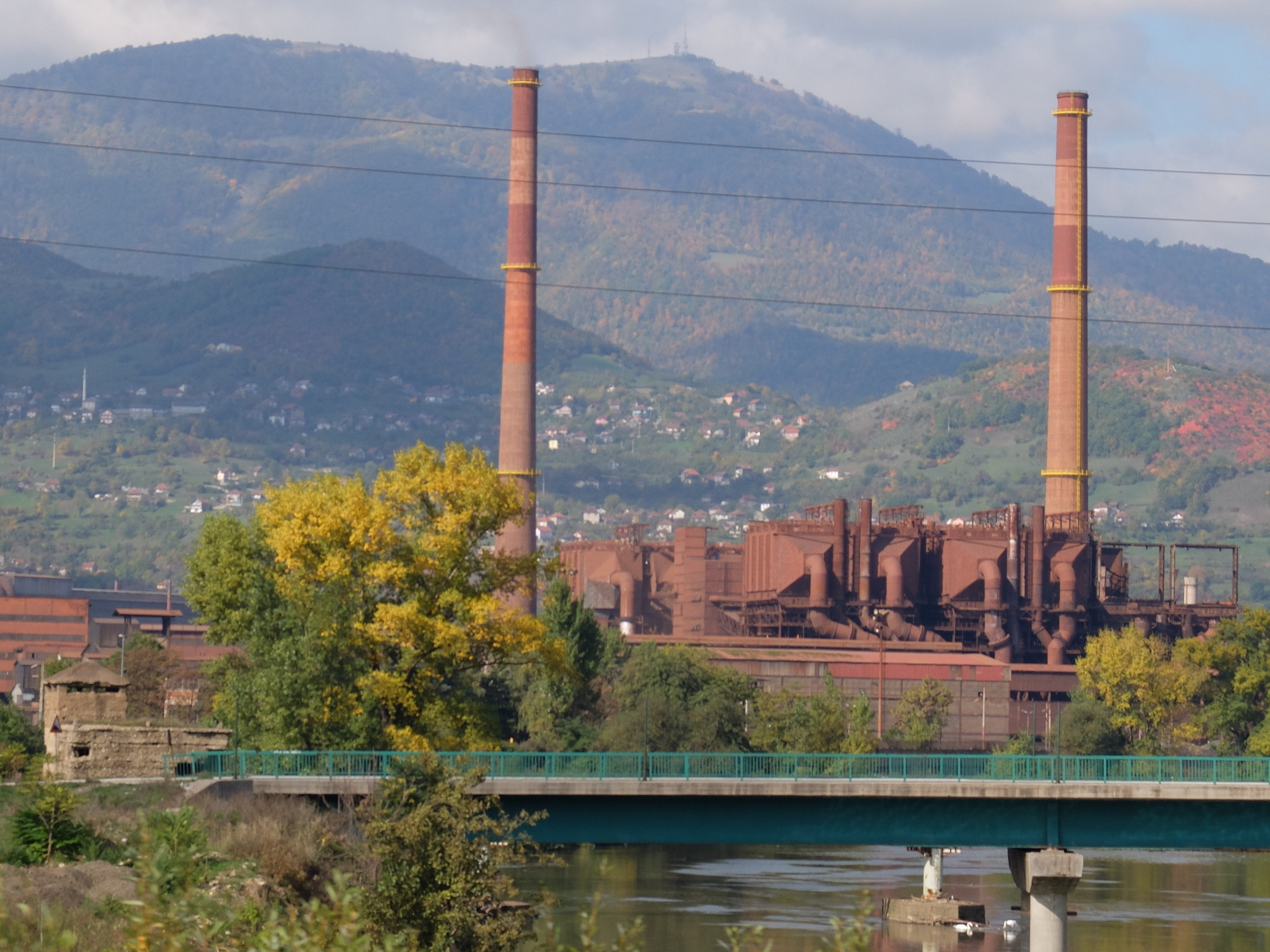
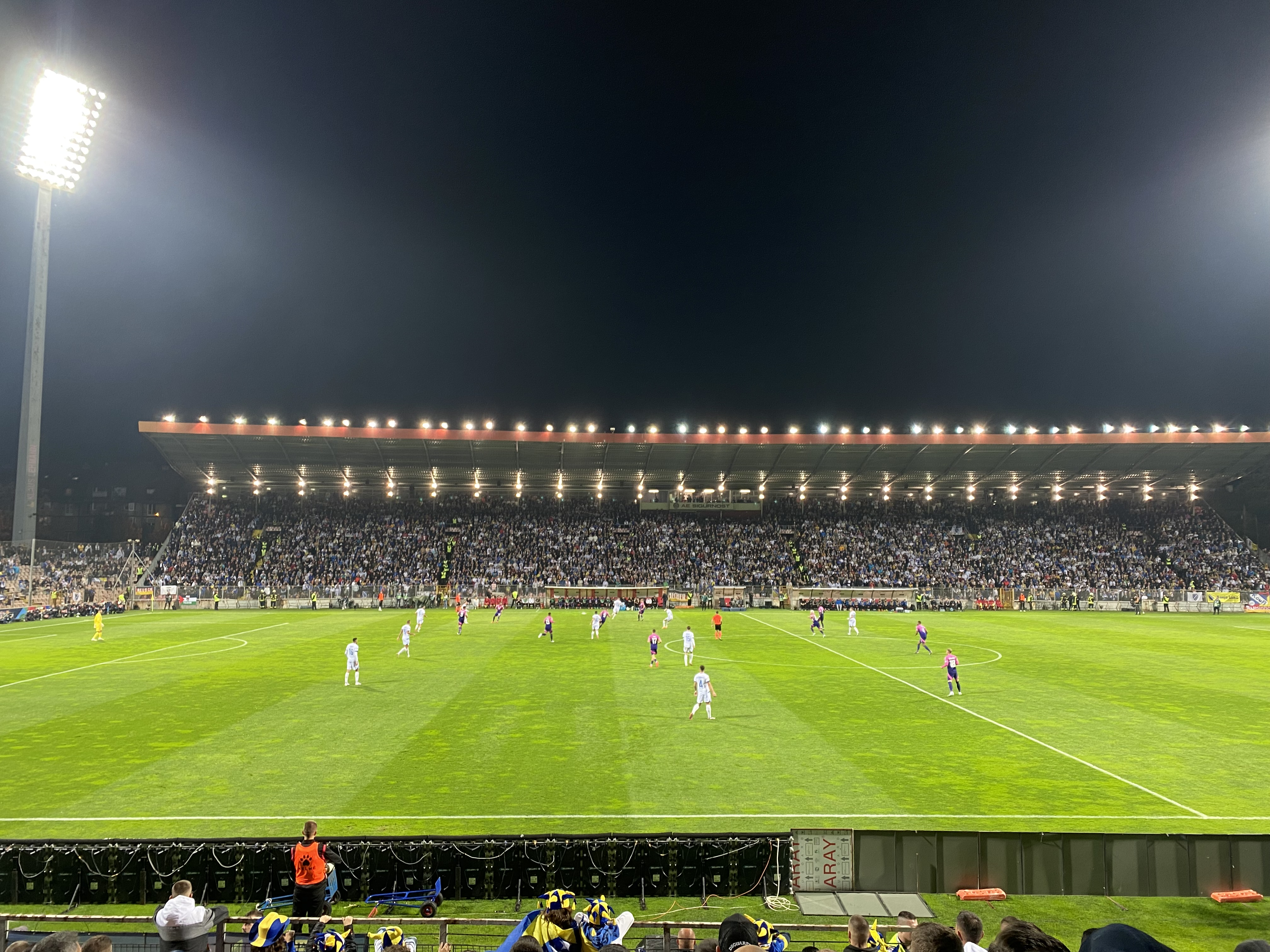
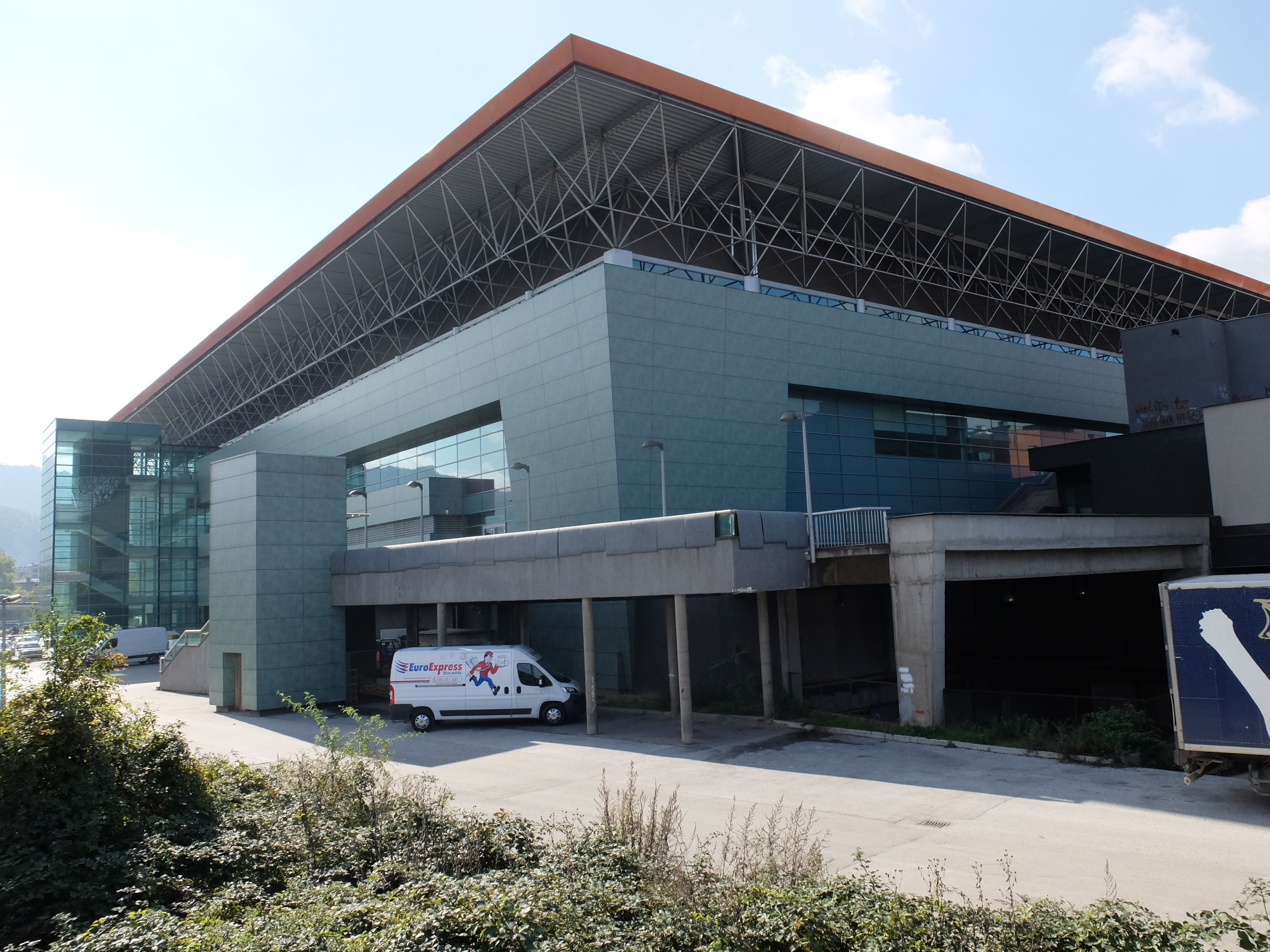
- Panoramic view of Zenica Vranduk Fortress Zenica steelworks Bilino Polje Stadium Arena Zenica

- Flag Coat of arms
- Etymology: from Proto-Slavic zěnica ("pupil")
- Nicknames: Steel/Iron city, Nicaze
- Location within Bosnia and Herzegovina
- Interactive map of Zenica
- Location within Bosnia and Herzegovina
- Coordinates: 44°12′14″N 17°54′28″E
- Country: Bosnia and Herzegovina
- Entity: Federation of Bosnia and Herzegovina
- Canton: Zenica-Doboj
- Current name: 1415 or March 1436 (Zenica)
- 1st Mayor: before 1908 (Ahmetaga Mutapčić)
- Municipality became City: 20 November 2014 (Zenica City)

Government
  - Body: Council
  - Mayor: Fuad Kasumović (BHI)

Area
  - City: 558.5 km^{2} (215.6 sq mi)
  - Urban: 43.01 km^{2} (16.61 sq mi)
- Elevation: 310–350 m (1,020–1,150 ft)

Population (2013)
  - City: 110,663
  - Density: 198.1/km^{2} (513.2/sq mi)
  - Urban: 70,553
- Demonym: Zenican (Bosnian: Zeničanin / Зеничанин)
- Time zone: UTC+1 (CET)
  - Summer (DST): UTC+2 (CEST)
- Postal code: BA-72000 (for whole Zenica City, including Zenica city); BA-72100 (for Zenica city only as settled place)
- Area code: +387 32
- Website: zenica.ba

Zenica (English: /ˈzɛnɪtsə/ ZEN-it-sə, Bosnian: [zěnitsa]) is a city in Bosnia and Herzegovina and an administrative and economic center of the Federation of Bosnia and Herzegovina's Zenica-Doboj Canton. It is located in the Bosna river valley, about 70 km (43 mi) north of Sarajevo. The city is known for its Ironworks Zenica factory but also as a significant university center. According to the 2013 census, the settlement of Zenica itself counts 70,553 citizens and the administrative area 110,663, making it the nation's fourth-largest city.

The urban part of today's city was formed in several phases, including Neolithic, Illyrian, and the Roman Municipium of Bistua Nuova (2nd–4th century; old name of the city), with an early Christian dual basilica. Traces of an ancient settlement have been found here as well; villa rustica, thermae, a temple, and other buildings were also present. The earliest findings date from the period of 3000–2000 BC; they were found in the localities of Drivuša and Gradišće. Zenica's current name was first mentioned in 1415. A medieval church has been unearthed in Zenica, as well as the Franciscan Monastery of St. Mary. The independence of Medieval Bosnia is directly connected to Zenica (Gradješa's plate and abjuration act; Kulin ban's time; Vranduk, a castle of the Bosnian kings; Janjići and 'hižas' [homes] of Bosnian Church members; stećci, stone tombstone monuments, etc.) During Ottoman rule (1463–1878), Zenica became a Muslim town; at the end of the 17th century, Zenica had 2,000 citizens, mostly Muslims; Orthodox and Catholic Christians are mentioned again from the end of the 18th century, and Jews in the 19th century. Modern Zenica was mostly built in the Austro-Hungarian and Yugoslavian periods. The population rose rapidly during the 20th century; however, from the Bosnian War until 2013, the city lost a quarter of its population. The municipality of Zenica became the City of Zenica in 2014.

The city is geographically located in the heart of Bosnia. The settled area is 43.01 km^{2} (16.61 mi^{2}) and of the city proper covers 558.5 km^{2} (215.6 mi^{2}). Elevation is 310–350 m (1,017–1,148 ft). The rivers Bosna, Lašva, Babina, and Kočeva flow through the settlement. A moderate continental climate prevails. The city has thirteen urban local settlements and it consists of a total of 81 rural settlements.

Zenica has nine national monuments. The football club Čelik is a landmark of the city, and it also has one of the tallest buildings in Bosnia and Herzegovina—Lamela. Famous Zenicans include Semir Osmanagić, Anabela Basalo, Danis Tanović, Amar Jašarspahić Gile, Mladen Krstajić, Dejan Lovren, Mervana Jugić-Salkić, and Amel Tuka.

== Etymology ==
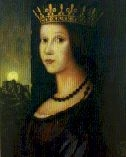
Portrait of Catherine of Bosnia

There are several theories about the origins of name Zenica.

According to orally transmitted tradition, the city was named after the pupil of the eye (Ekavian Bosnian: zenica – pupil). There is also a legend that Zenica's name derives from an exclamation by Queen Katarina Kosača Kotromanić, who, upon leaving Bobovac during the Ottoman conquest of Bosnia in 1463, said "My pupil is left behind!" (Bosnian: Osta moja z[j]enica!). Because of its location in the center of Zenica field, the city is indeed analogous to the eye's pupil.

The name of the city can also be derived from the word zenit, meaning zenith, because it is in the center of Bosnia and Herzegovina.

== History ==
Historical affiliations

- Kingdom of Bosnia 1436–1461
- Ottoman Empire 1461–1878
- Austro-Hungarian Empire 1878–1918
- State of Slovenes, Croats and Serbs 1918
- Kingdom of Serbs, Croats and Slovenes 1918–29
- Kingdom of Yugoslavia 1929–41
- Independent State of Croatia 1941–45
- DF Yugoslavia 1945–46;
  FPR/SFR Yugoslavia 1946/1963–92
- Republic of Bosnia and Herzegovina 1992–95
- Bosnia and Herzegovina 1995–present

The urban part of today's Zenica formed through several phases, which chronologically include a Neolithic community, the Illyrian 'gradina', the Roman Municipium of Bistua Nuova, and a Christian era-community.

In the Bilimišće district, traces of ancient settlements have been found. In the outlying villages of Putovići and Tišina, where villa rustica dominate, thermae, a temple, and a series of other sites are also present.

=== Prehistory ===
The earliest findings in Zenica date from the period of 3000 to 2000 BC; they were found in the localities of Drivuša and Gradišće. Metal axes, arrows, ornamental fibulae, and ceramic remains were unearthed from the Orahovički stream near Nemila, Gračanica, Ravna, and other places.
The Illyrians came to this region during the transition from the Bronze and the Iron Age (from the 6th to the 5th centuries BC). Their defensive buildings, "gradinas", are the best known (the word is derived from the verb Bosnian: graditi – to build).
The urban part of today's Zenica was already formed in the younger Stone Age—the Neolithic, and especially later, during the time of the Illyrians. Toponyms of their "gradinas" demonstrate this: Gradišće, Gračanica, Gradac. A specific locality, Gradina, in Kopilo village, indicates that Zenica and its surrounding areas hosted organized human life around 2000 BC. There is a weak question of the presence of the Illyrian Old-Balkan tribe of Daesitiates in the Zenica region. The Daesitiates are a result of ethno-social development of early human life in prehistory; the transition period from the Bronze to the Iron Age resulted in Daesitiates emerging at the Lašva–Drina river belt. The Daesitiates confronted the Romans in 34 BC; the Romans did not make a long-lasting triumph, and the Illyrians were defeated in the city of Arduba, which was burnt down in 6–9 A.C. This is how the royal city of Vranduk probably existed in the time of the Illyrians, under the name Arduba.

Recent (August 2019) international archaeological research, conducted by the Vienna (Institute for Oriental and European Archaeology), Zenica (Zenica museum), and students and scientists from Sarajevo, using modern technology, shows that settlements with people and animals existed near Zenica over 3,100 years ago. Skeletons of pigs, cattle, and goats were found in Kopilo, an elevated place (600 m a.s.l.), indicating a farming settlement. Two tombs (one with human bones and ceramics), two tumuli, and a completely new prehistorical settlement, Ravna gradina, were also found.

=== Antiquity ===
The Romans tried to conquer the region at the end of the 3rd century BC Bellum Batonianum and were present in the area from the 6th to the 9th centuries. They ruled continuously in many areas until close to the end of the 4th century (after Arduba's fall).

Today's area of Zenica had its peak in the first six centuries of the Common Era, when it included one the most important municipiums and centers of Christian dioceses in Bosnia: Bistua Nuova—seat of the Bistuenska diocese and the seat of Roman Christianity in the Bosnian area prior to the Slavs' arrival. Data suggesting that Bistua Nuova's bishop Andrew (Andreas, Andrija) took part in and was a signer of Solin sinodas in 530 and 533 underlines its importance. Ancient tombstone monuments date from ancient Bistua Nuova, as well as remains of old Christian basilicas. In the urban settlement of Odmut and the rural settlements of Putovići and Tišina, archaeologists have found epigraphs that have led them to conclude that Bistua Nuova was in the Zenica area.

An important road towards Salona (Solin), Argentarium (Srebrenica), and Sirmium (Srijemska Mitrovica) also passed through Bistua Nuova.

Barbarian invasions from the north (mainly Germans at the end of the 3rd century, as well as Slavs later) forced Christianity to retreat from these areas. During the invasions, at the beginning of the 7th century, Bistua Nuova was destroyed, along with its basilica. It is believed that the barbarian invasions destroyed a huge part of the ancient inheritance. Goths, Avars, and Slavs passed through this location. The Slavs came in the 6th and 7th centuries and inhabited the middle part of the Bosna river stream—where Zenica Field is located. They formed tribal communities and were organized into a tribal ruling unit called a "župa" (parish). After their invasions, almost one century was needed for the first Slavic countries to form.

=== Medieval Bosnia ===
The history of medieval Zenica is not well recorded. There is but a single item of evidence from 1244 about Croatian-Hungarian king Béla IV's charter. According to the documents that have so far been studied, the city's current name was first mentioned on 16 March 1436 (or 20 March 1436, annually celebrated as "Zenica Day") and later—Zenica is mentioned in a series of documents related to the Republic of Ragusa (Republic of Dubrovačka). Among other Bosnian parishes, Bored parish, which includes "Bilina poila", is mentioned in the charter. The place refers to one part of the town of Zenica, today known as Bilino polje. The same place is mentioned in another document, dated 8 April 1203; it records a group of Bogomil chiefs who renounced paternalism before Innocent III's court chaplain John of Casamaris. Bogomilism's presence in the Zenica area and its status as a seat of the Bogomil Church is supported not only by written documents but also by headstones that illuminate the church's hierarchy.

In the Middle Ages, specifically in 1370, the settlement of Klopče was mentioned, as well as a family of that name. On 8 January 1404, the Bosnian bishop from Janjići sent dispatches to the Ragusan prince Vlaho Sorkočević. In the Zenica settlement of Varošište, a medieval church has been unearthed, as well as a Franciscan monastery to St. Mary, which was built by sculptor Ivan Hrelić, a student of Juraj Dalmatinac.

=== Ottoman era ===
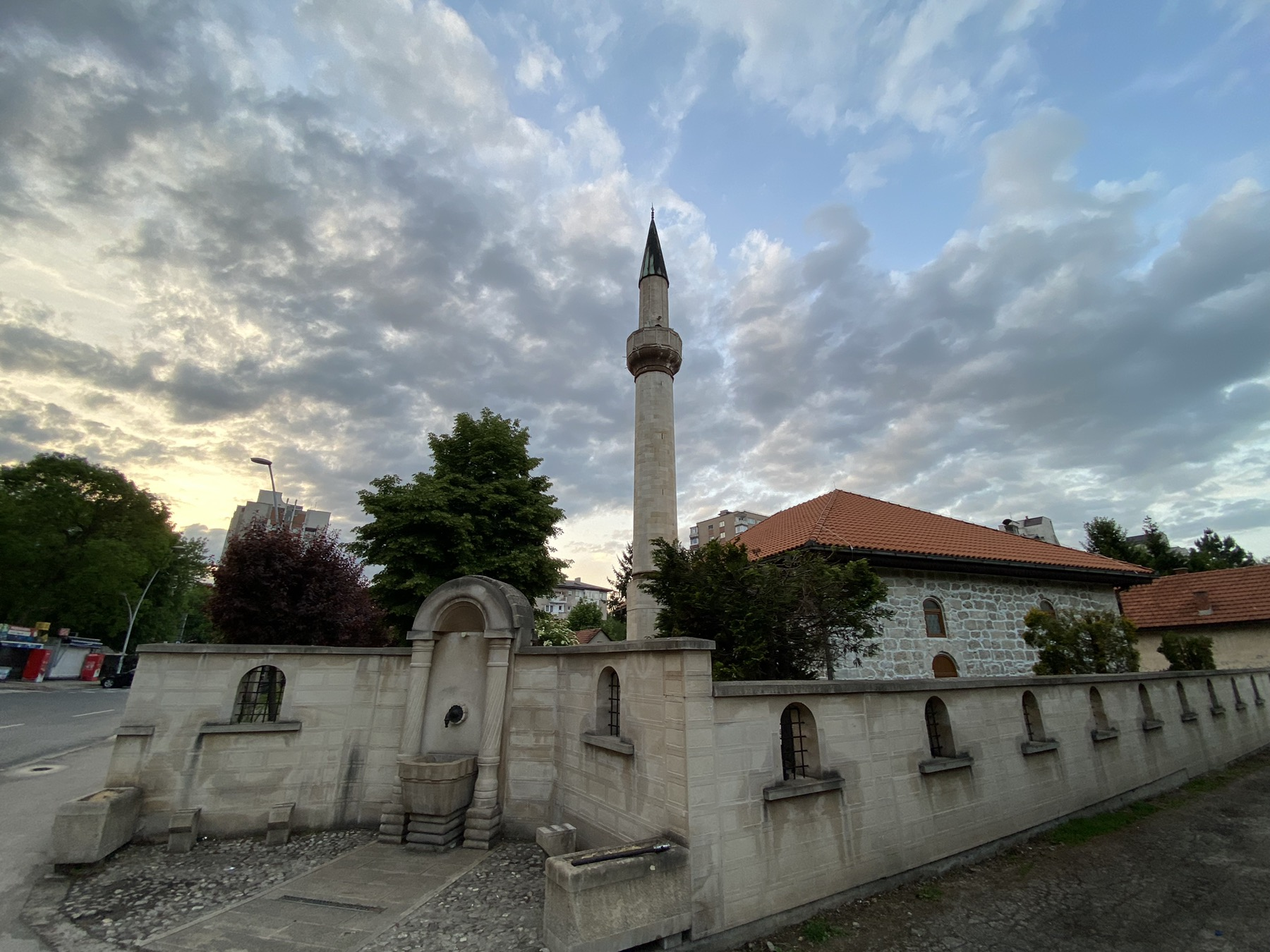
View of Sejmenska mosque, the second oldest mosque in Zenica, a national monument of Bosnia and Herzegovina.

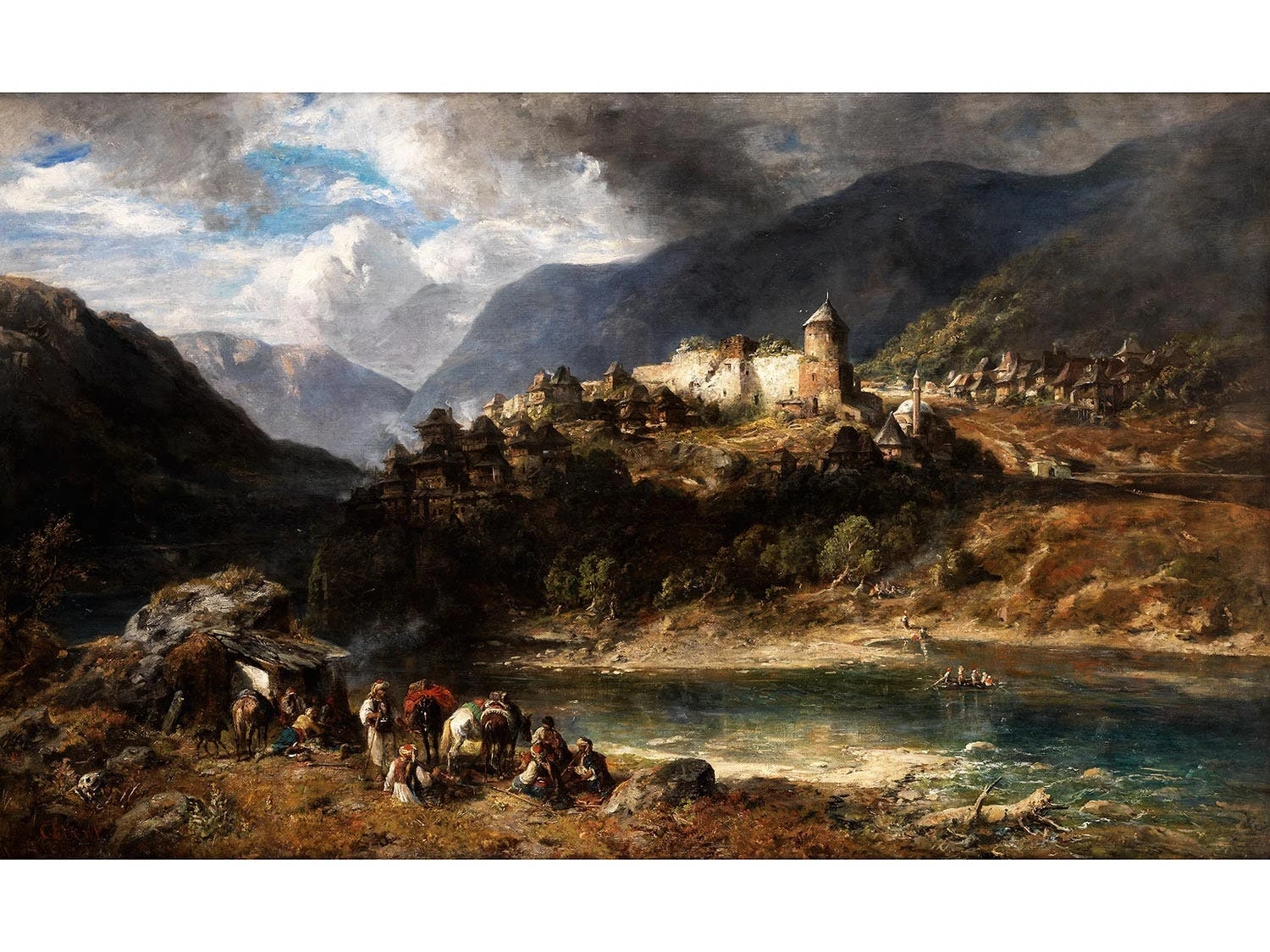
Mid-19th century painting by Carl Ebert (1821–1885), Fortress Vranduk in Bosnia (German: Die Festung Vranduk in Bosnien). The picture shows Bosnians on the mountain of Vranduk, beside the Bosna river)

Bosnia experienced Ottoman incursions starting in 1386. The first Ottoman entry into Zenica relates to their victory over Hungarian warriors near Doboj in 1415. Zenica has been mentioned under today's name since that event. The first official record of the city's name is in a document dated 16 March 1436, which relates to the invasion and robbery of Zachlumia by the Ottoman Duke Barak, who retreated towards Zenica and there received Ragusan money in the name of redemption. From the time of that event until the complete establishment of Ottomans rule in Bosnia in 1463, there is no mention of Zenica in relevant documents. For that reason, this era of the city's history cannot be covered in detail.

After administrative changes introduced in the first years of the rule, Zenica became part of Brod kadiluk in the newly formed Sanjak of Bosnia. Nahya of Zenica was first mentioned in 1485. It bore that name until the end of the 18th century and later became Zenica srez.

During Ottoman rule (1463–1878), the change of direction in the main trade route in turn changed the city and, except for a short period when it was a seat of the Brod judge Qadii (until 1557), Zenica was a kasbah that included mosques, a madrasa, several mektebs, shadirvans, caravanserais, and other types of Islamic architecture.

In one description from 1697, Zenica had 2,000 citizens, the majority of them Muslim. At the end of the 18th century, Orthodox and Catholic Christians are mentioned again, as are Jews in the 19th century.

After the ruin and exodus following the intrusion of Eugene of Savoy in 1697, a time of stabilization began in Zenica.

=== Austro-Hungarian era ===
After the Berlin Congress, held in 1878, the Austro-Hungarian monarchy was given the rights to occupy Bosnia and Herzegovina; armed resistance to occupying troops soon arose. It is believed that Zenica, more precisely the Hadži Mazića house, was the place of negotiations between representatives of the Ottoman authorities in the Bosnian vilayet of Hafiz-pasha and the commander of the Austro-Hungarian occupying forces, General Filipović, on the conditions of a cessation of the conflict.

During this time, Zenica witnessed the construction of various types of economically significant infrastructure, including a railway from Bosanski Brod in 1879, a coal mine in 1880, a paper factory (1885), ironworks (1892), and a penitentiary (1886). In 1908, a power station was built, which enabled the introduction of electric public lighting. State schools were also opened, the first in 1885 and the second in 1910. Confessional schools also opened, both for Catholic and Orthodox churches, and lectures at these schools and at madrasas began to be conducted in the local language. Cultural societies were organized, such as the Croatian Singing Society, as well as hunting and mountaineering clubs. In 1910, the first cinema opened in Zenica.

=== End of the 19th century; 20th century ===
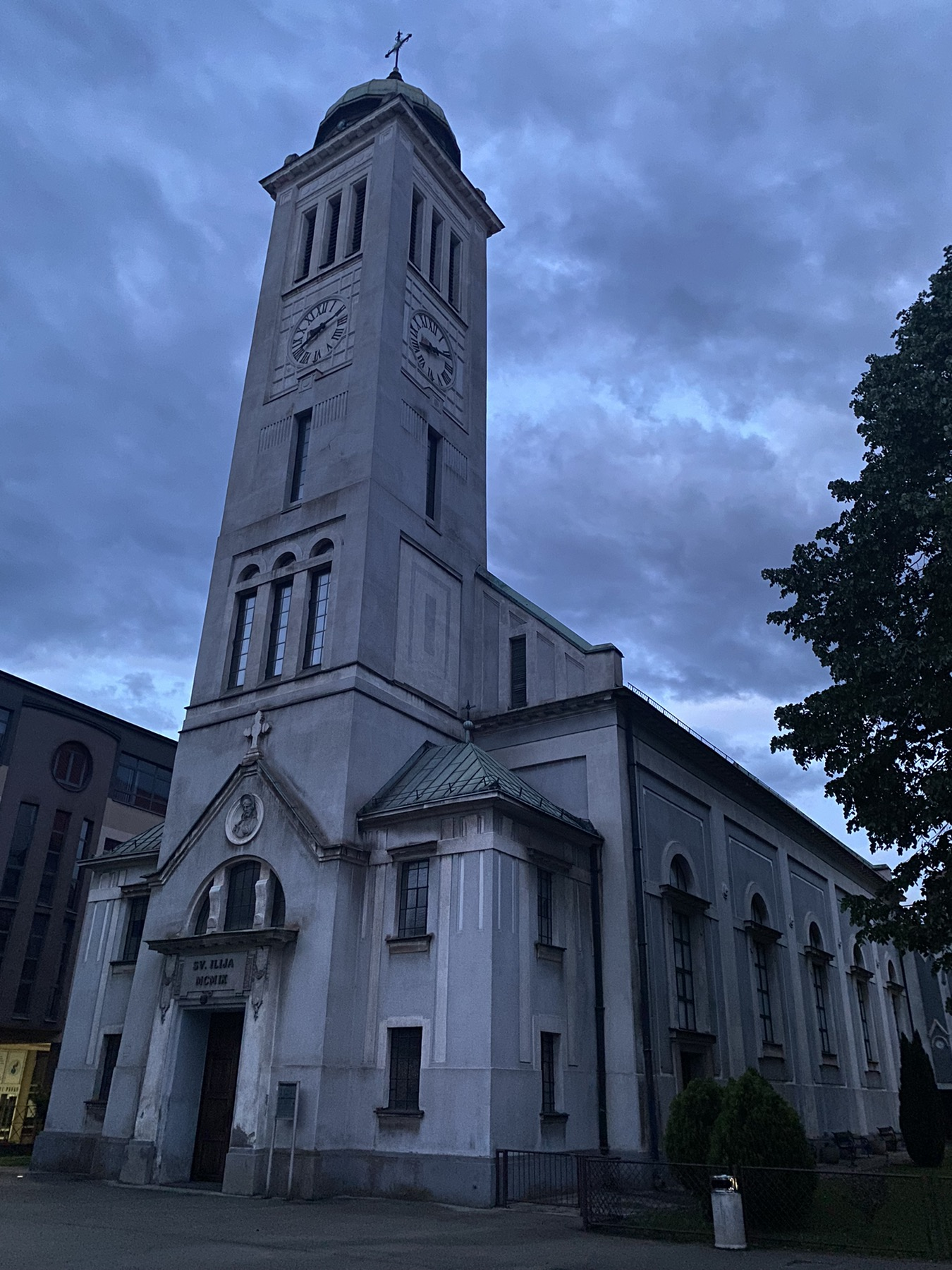
The Catholic St. Elijah Church in New Zenica, a national monument of Bosnia and Herzegovina

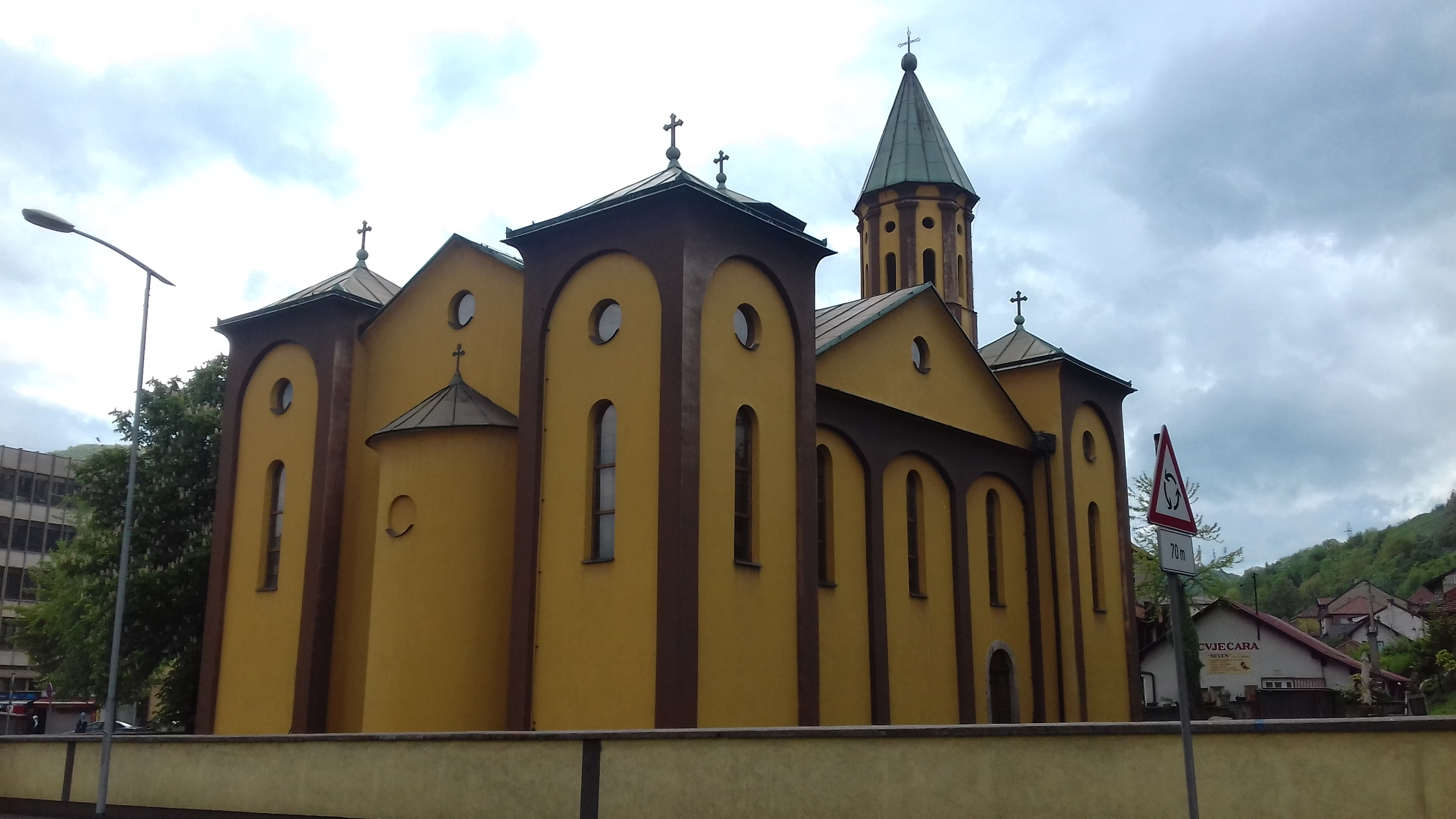
The Orthodox Church of the Nativity of Our Lady in Carina, a national monument of Bosnia and Herzegovina

By the end of the 19th and the beginning of the 20th centuries, urbanization was underway and the number of citizens increased severalfold. According to the 1910 census, the town had a population of 7,215. This rapid growth was reflected by a construction boom: The Orthodox Church of the Nativity of Our Lady was erected in 1885, two Catholic churches went up in 1910, and a synagogue was built in 1903, not to mention hotels, schools, water-supply infrastructure, modern roads, etc.

After World War I, the Kingdom of SHS was formed, which in 1929 became the Kingdom of Yugoslavia and included Bosnia and Herzegovina. The political, economic, and social life of Bosnia and Herzegovina from 1918 to 1941 stagnated, though this situation changed slightly before the beginning of World War II, with investments in the city's ironworks.

==== Yugoslavia ====
After Zenica's liberation by partisans on 12 April 1945, today celebrated as Zenica Liberation Day, the city began to develop as an industrial center. It expanded and included the former villages of Bilino Polje, Klopče, and Radakovo. New apartment blocks were built to cater to the increasing number of coal miners and steelworkers. The town's population in 1948 was only about 15,000 and by 1961, it had grown to over 30,000. In 1981, that number stood at over 63,000 and after the last Yugoslavian census, the town had over 96,000 citizens, a sixfold increase in population since the formation of Yugoslavia.

==== Bosnian War ====
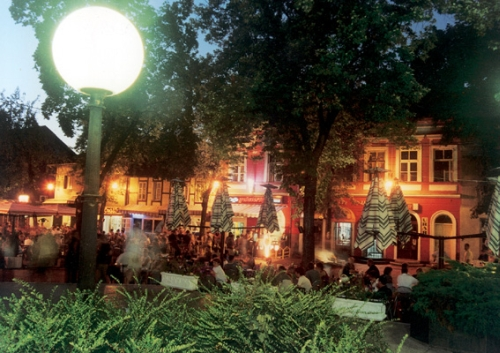
Part of the old town at night

One year before the outbreak of the Bosnian War, in 1991, Zenica became the seat of one of the first private and independent radio stations in Eastern Europe—Radio CD-CEMP. In the spring of 1993, the station's owner, a journalist, won a Belgian accolade for independent journalism, "The Pen of Peace".

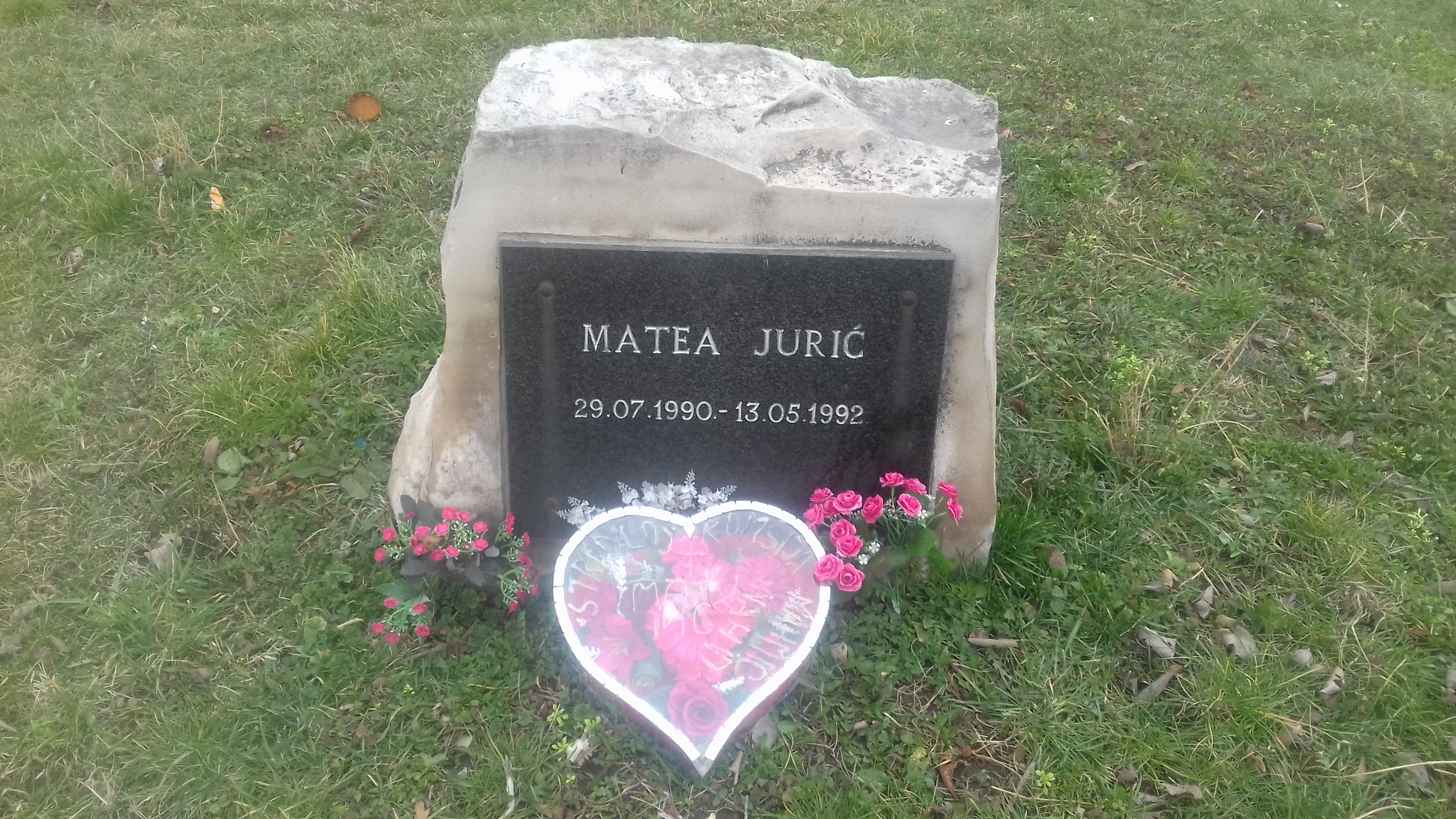
Memorial stone and plaque for Matea Jurić, with flowers laid in front (2020)

The first official civilian victim of the Bosnian War in Zenica was a two-year-old Croat girl named Matea Jurić (29 July 1990 – 13 May 1992), who was killed by a gunshot during the blockade of the military barracks of the JNA in the urban settlement of Bilimišće. A memorial was erected in her honour.

On 26 January 1993, the Zenica Music School was converted into an unofficial wartime internment camp, where Serbs and Croats from Zenica and surrounding settlements were held and subsequently abused.

On 19 April 1993, during the Croat–Bosniak War, sixteen civilians were killed and fifty injured when a HVO howitzer-fired grenade hit the central bazaar of Zenica. The grenade was shot from the village of Putićevo [15 km (9.3 mi)]. During this period, Zenica was isolated from the rest of the world for a year and a half. The city suffered significant losses from sniper fire, arson, hunger, and a lack of electricity.

Zenica's populace changed much during the war, with the arrival of Muslims (today's Bosniaks) from other parts of Bosnia and Herzegovina and the departure of Serbs to areas under Serb control.

Historical images of Zenica

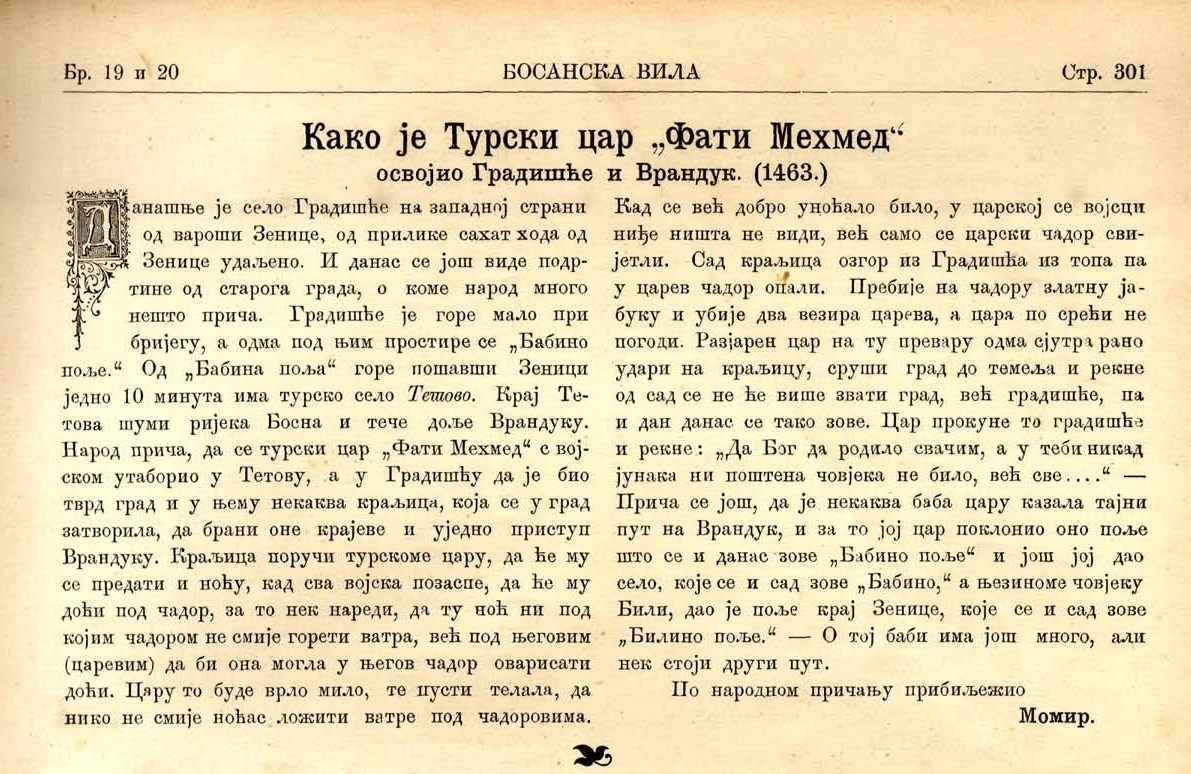
Bosanska vila article (1890) on Fatih Mehmed's conquest of Gradišće and Vranduk in 1463

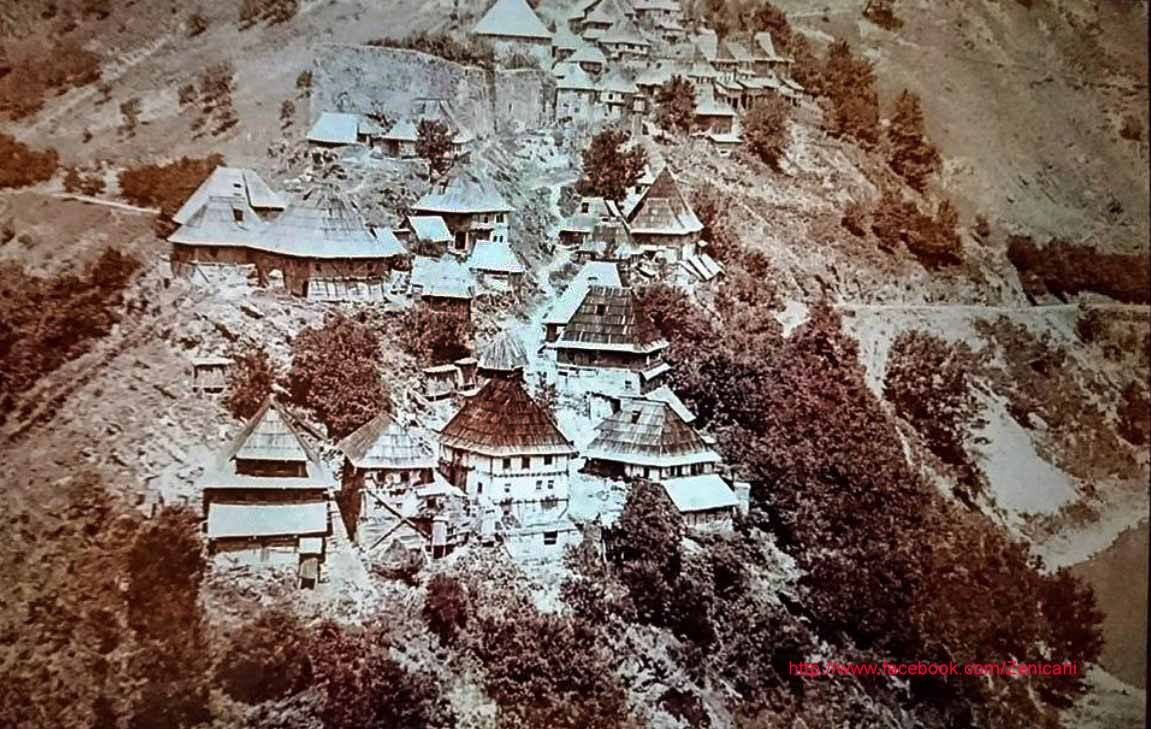
Vranduk Fortress panorama (1895)

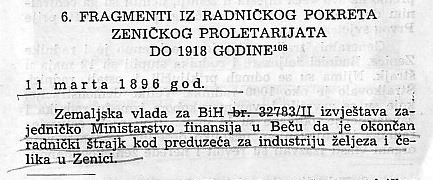
1896 Zenica workers' strike

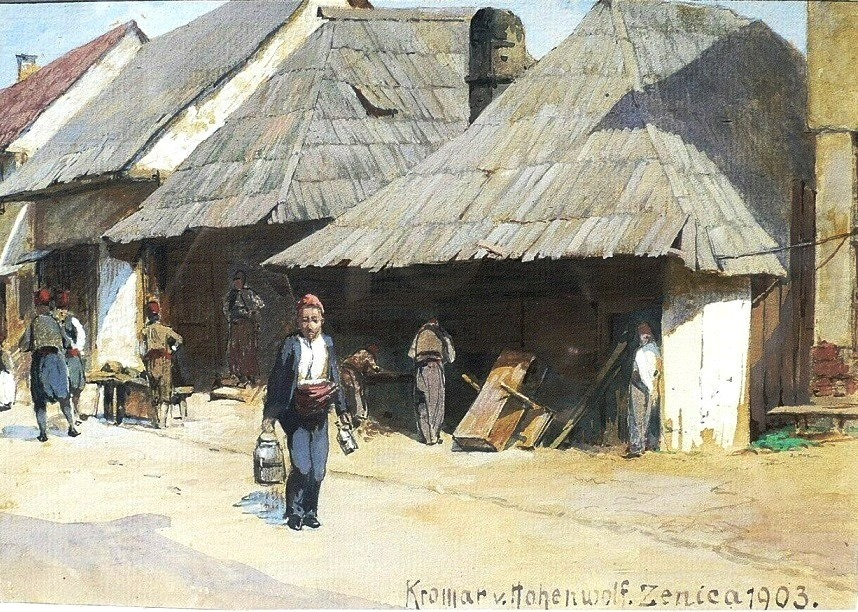
Dorfleben (Village Life; 1903), watercolor by Richard Conrad Kromar (1874–1948)

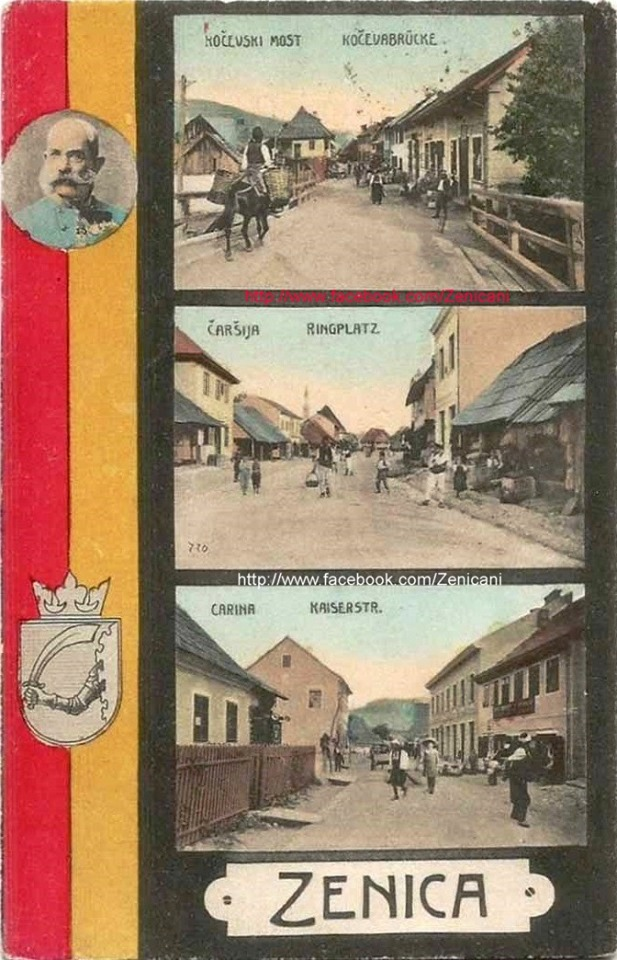
Tripartite postcard (1907)

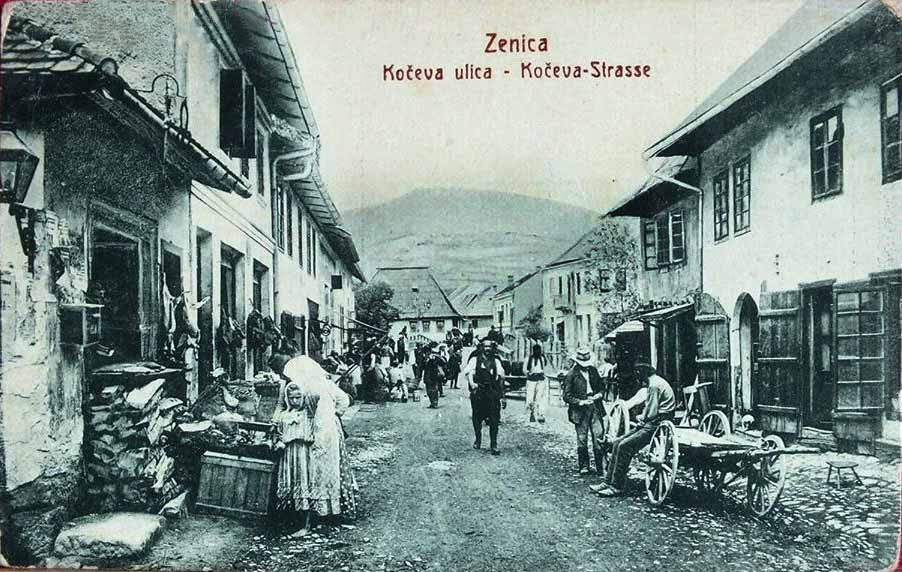
Čaršija of Kočeva street (postcard; 1909)

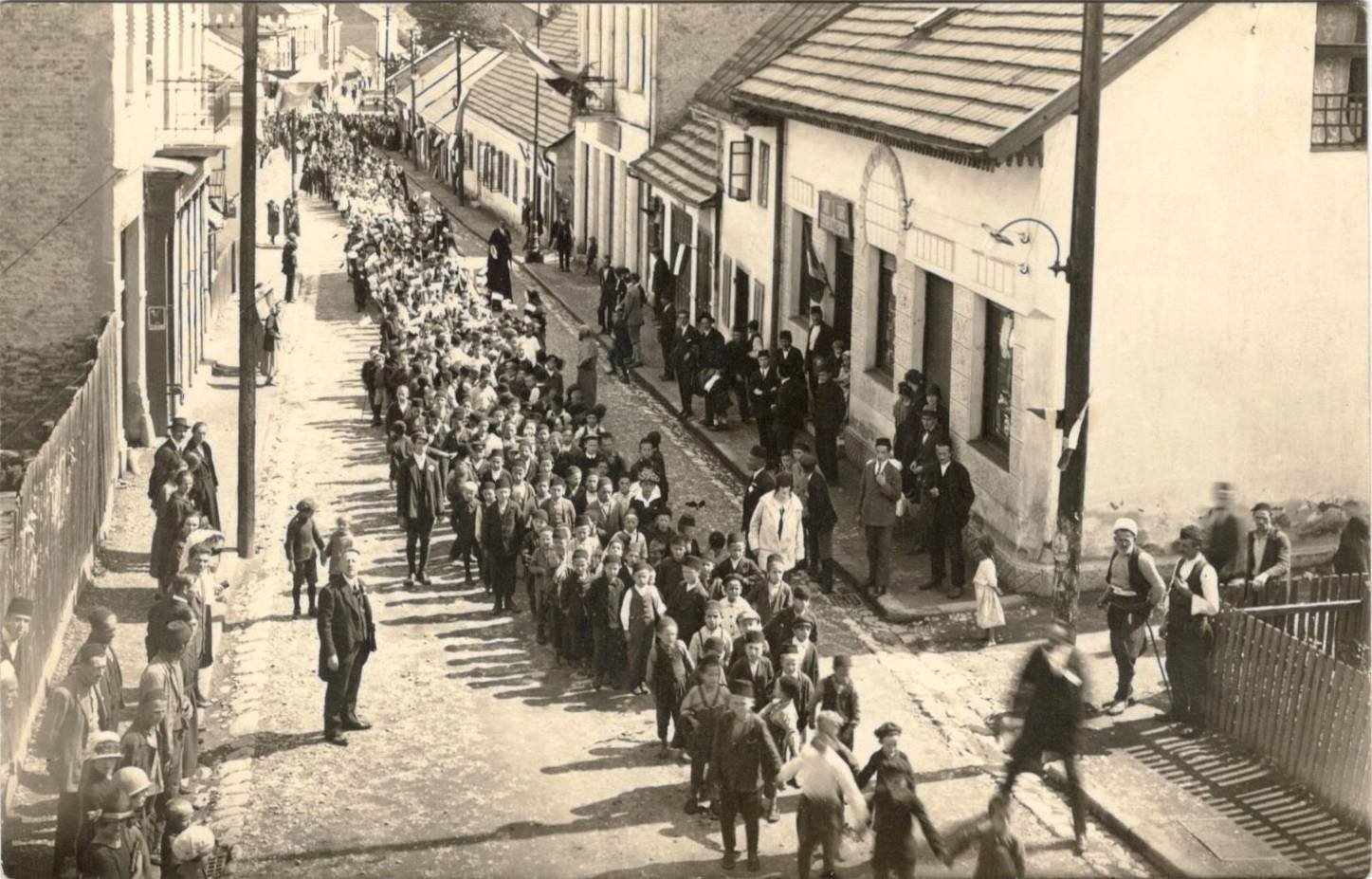
King's birthday, King Peter I street (today's Titova; retouched postcard, 1928)

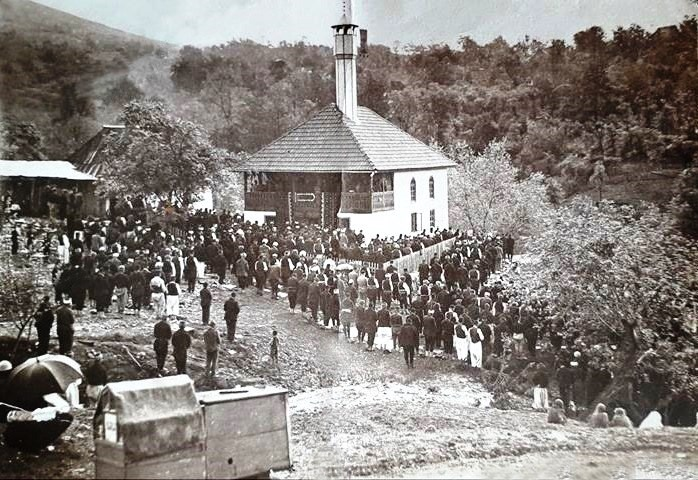
Ričice mosque inauguration (1928)

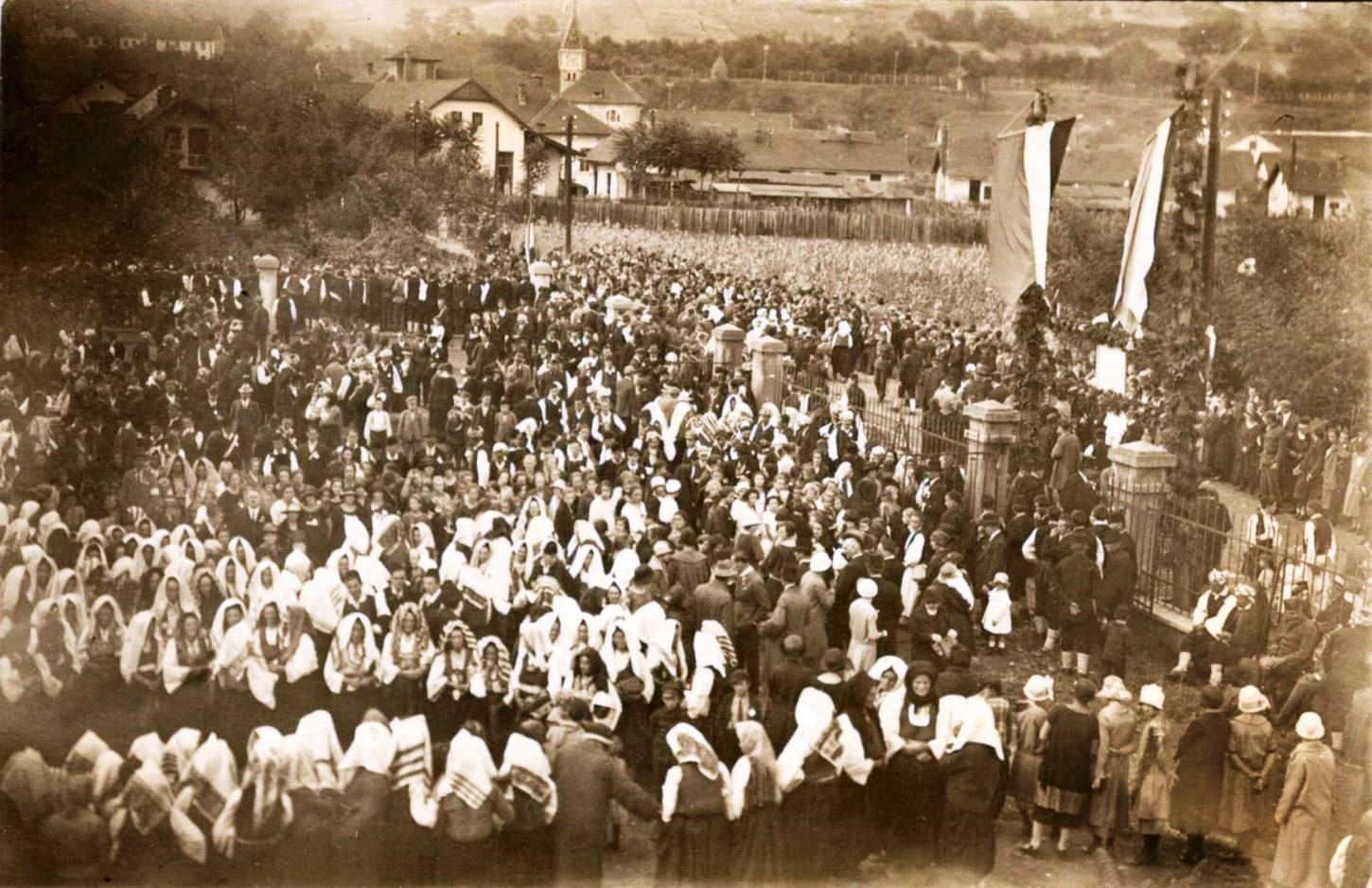
People's gathering in front of Catholic Church of St. Elijah on a holy day (1932)

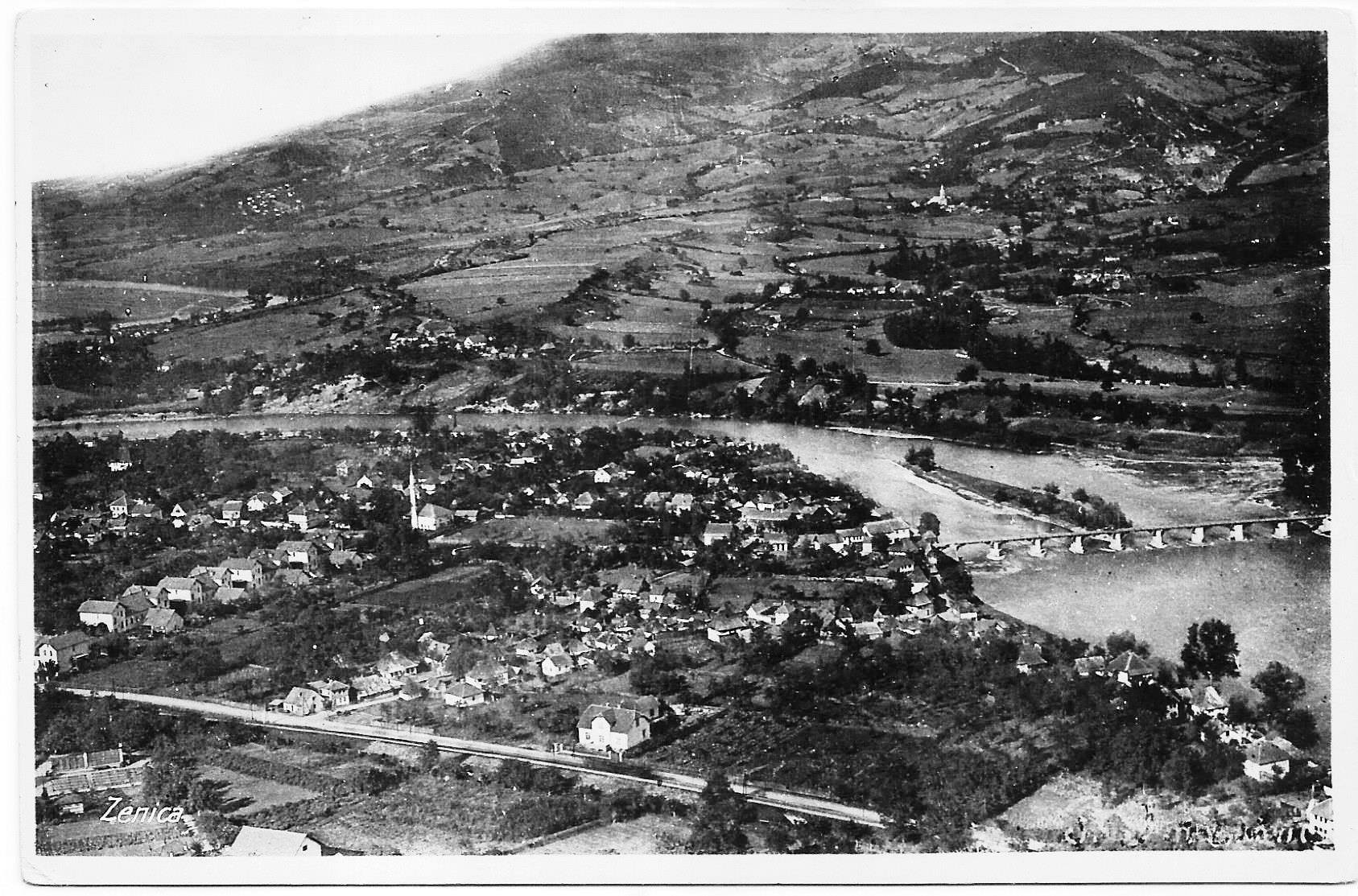
Southern Zenica, downtown near Bosna (1935)

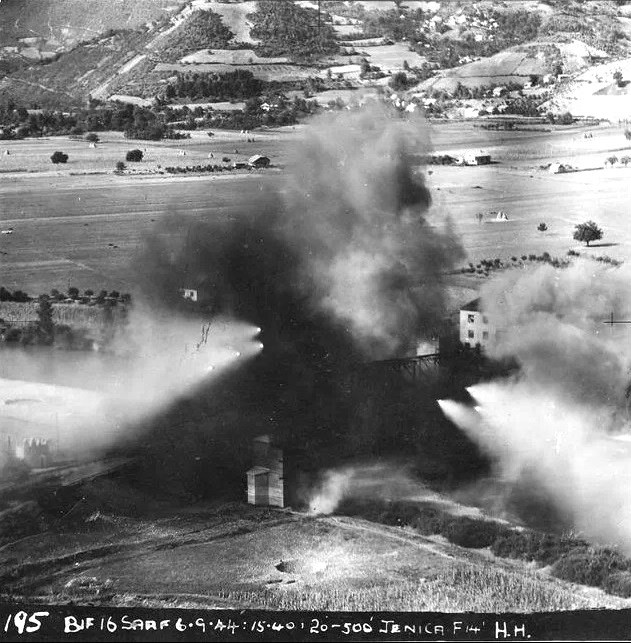
Bombing of the "Pehare" railway bridge by 16 Squadron SAAF (1944)

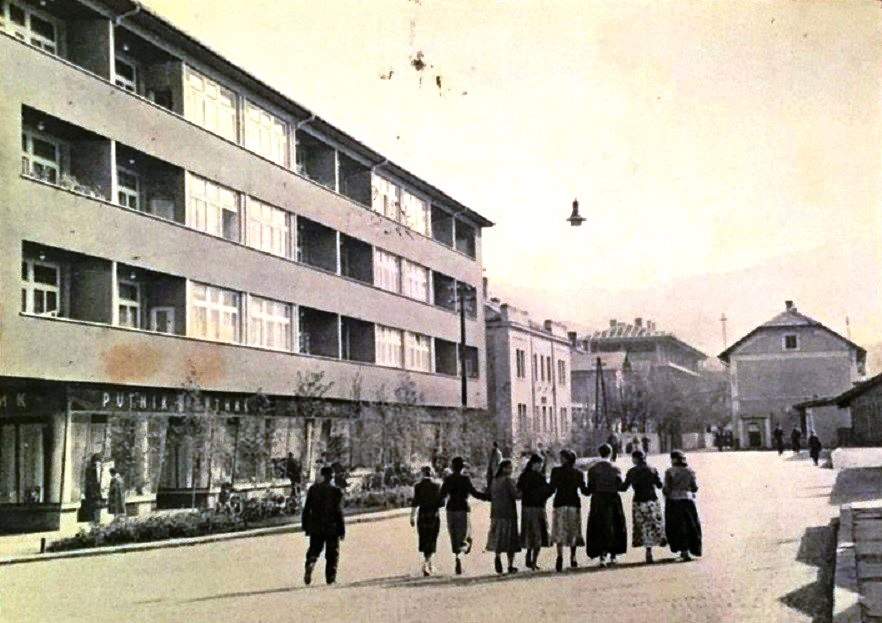
Zenican girls occupied Sarajevska street (1958)

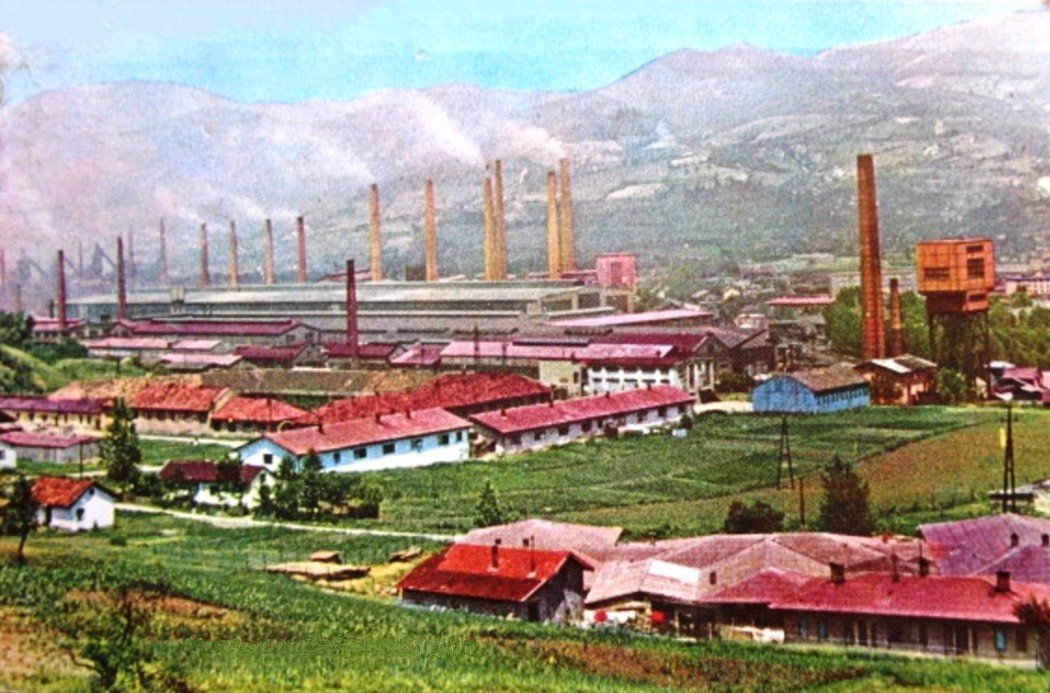
Panoramic view of the Ironworks (postcard; 1964)

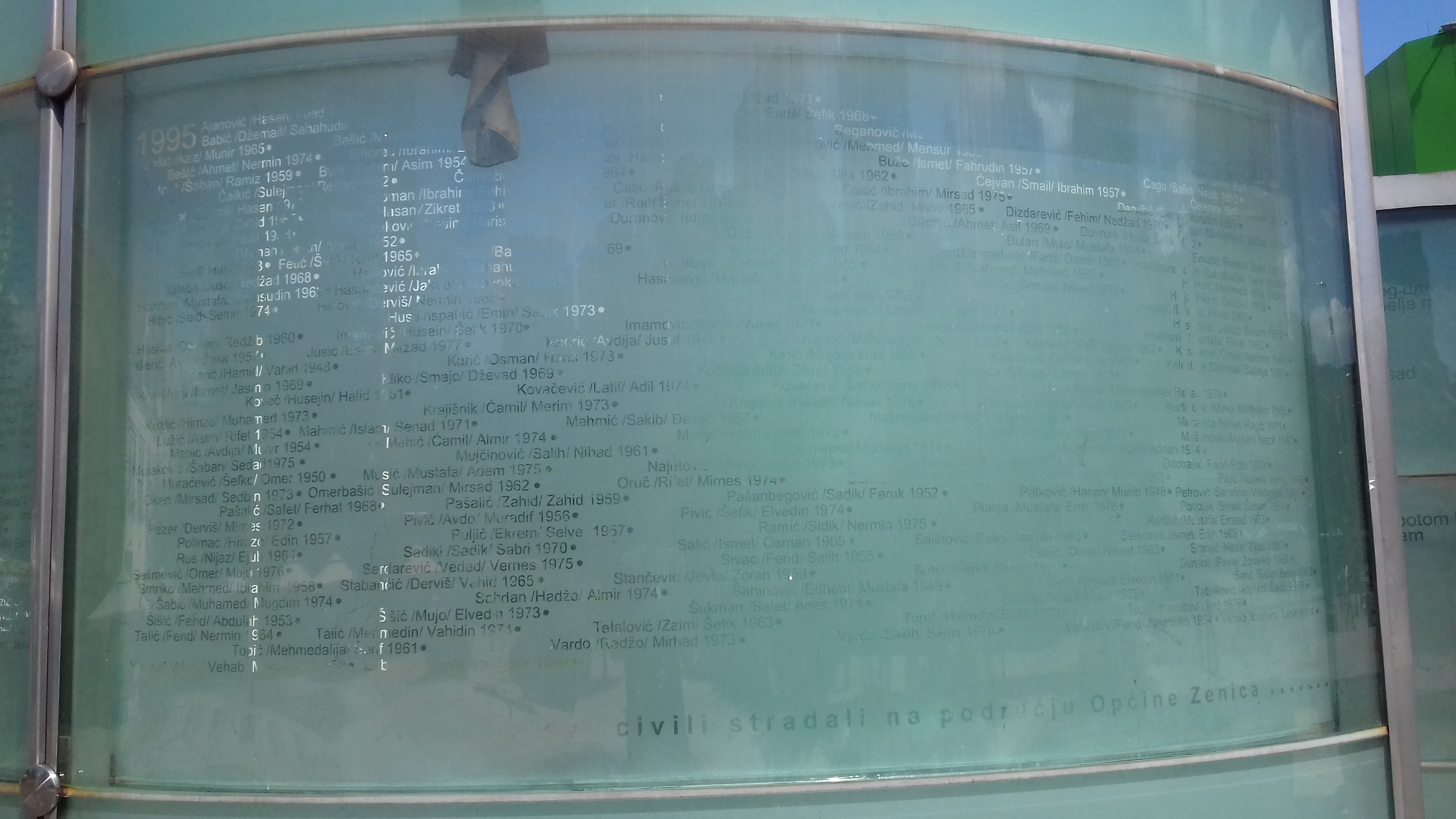
Part of the "Kameni spavač [Stone Sleeper] – Mak Dizdar" monument's vitreous memorial with names of thousands of Zenicans, victims of the Bosnian War (2019)

=== 21st century ===
Zenica recovered from the war and has continued to make steady progress. The city was governed for twenty years by the majority-Bosniak and Muslim Party of Democratic Action (SDA), which was mired in corruption and inefficiency, causing parts of the city to lack public lighting, water supply, a functioning sewer system, and paved roads.

A drastic population decrease of approximately 26% can be seen between 1991 and 2013, with Zenica losing one quarter of its citizens, partly due to the war as well as unfavourable economic circumstances, prompting young and middle-aged residents to emigrate to other parts of Europe and the United States.

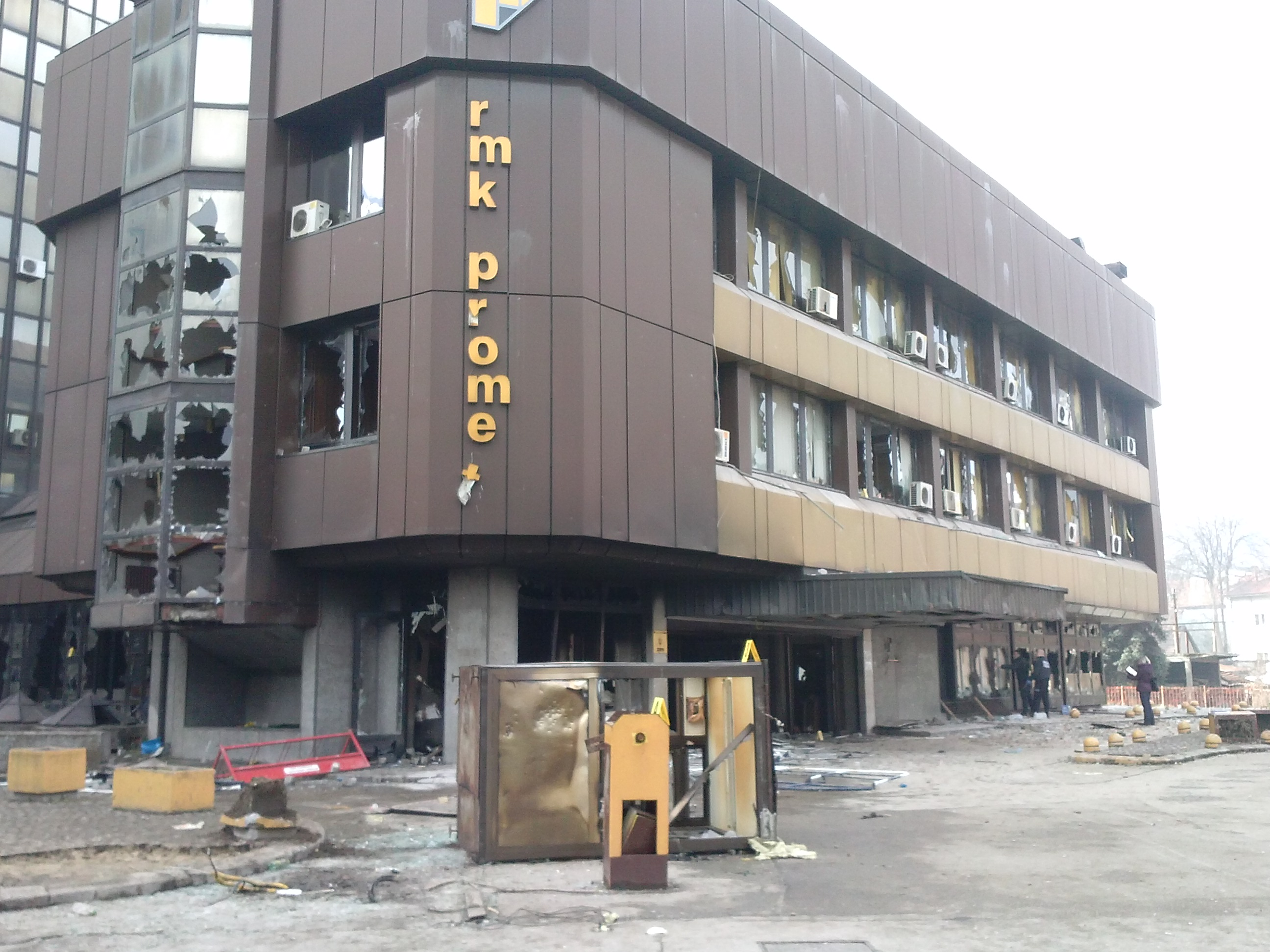
Smashed RMK building during the 2014 violent protests in Zenica

In 2014, Zenica—as well as other cities in Bosnia and Herzegovina—witnessed violent citizen protests. Various buildings were attacked and demolished, tens of people were taken to the hospital, and several officials resigned. The same year, Zenica was recategorized from a municipality to a city.

In the 2016 Bosnian municipal elections, independent politician Fuad Kasumović became mayor of the city. During his three years in office, he accelerated development, focusing on areas that had been neglected up to that point: city lighting was introduced, water-supply and sewer systems were upgraded, roads were paved, and bicycle lanes were introduced on a large scale. In 2019, German company nextbike introduced their bike-sharing system to the city. Plans were made for a new municipal heating system in order to put an end to regular heat shutoffs during the coldest seasons. New Year's concerts began to be held on the main square. The Serbian pop band Miligram inaugurated the event in 2017/18. Various other events have been organized, including the Zenica summer fest, music festivals, arts and crafts fairs, bazaars, and the like, thus improving the city's economic outlook. Additionally, the issue of stray dogs in the urban core was handled, pollution was significantly reduced, public transport was improved, and the city is also planning to resolve the problem of unemployment and to modernize the education system, among other projects.

== Geography ==
Geographic location of Zenica

Zenica is located in the heart of Bosnia, in the central part of the river Bosna's flow, after which the country is named. Its average elevation is 310–350 m (1,017–1,148 ft) above sea level.

=== Topography and layout ===
The topography of the city is that of a valley–basin. It is made up of a series of alluvial planins, hills, and mountain passes. The average altitude of the city itself, which is surrounded by hills, is 310–350 m (1,017–1,148 ft). However, there are many higher positions, such as Tvrtkovac, a hiking destination, whose altitude is 1,304 m (4,278 ft). The Zenica basin extends from the Lašva river canyon in the south to the Vranduk canyon and Vranduk gorge in the north—of an average length of 35 km (22 mi) and with an average altitude of 700 m (2,300 ft). Overview of the highest hills and mountains is given in the table below.

Highest mountains and hills of Zenica
Mountains and hills	Elev. [m (ft)]
Tvrtkovac	1,304 (4,278)
Hum	1,280 (4,200)
Vepar	1,083 (3,553)
Lisac	1,080 (3,540)
Smetovi	940 (3,080)
Klopačke stijene	918 (3,012)
Golubak	700 (2,300)
Vučijak	639 (2,096)
Zmajevac	638 (2,093)
Volovska glava	585 (1,919)
Janjićki vrh	561 (1,841)

The lowest topographical areas of Zenica are along the river Bosna. In both eastern and western directions, the altitudes increase and thus, the northwestern and northeastern areas of the city are the highest.

=== Water ===
Zenica is characterized by many small rivers and streams; all of them flow into the Bosna river basin.

The Bosna is the most important body of flowing water in the Zenica area. It springs from Ilidža, near Sarajevo, and flows into the river Sava, near Bosanski Šamac. Thus, the river has a natural south–north flow. Out of a total length of 274 km (170 mi), 47.95 km (29.79 mi) of the river is in the city, and most residences are built alongside it, as are roads and railways.

Apart from the Bosna, the rivers Lašva, Babina, and Kočeva also flow through Zenica.

=== Climate ===
Within the municipality, a moderate continental climate prevails. Summers are hot and winters moderately cold. The mean annual temperature is 10.4 °C (50.7 °F), average annual precipitation is 804 mm (31.7 in), with the lowest monthly precipitation occurring in March and the highest in November. The coldest month is January, with an average annual minimum of −1 °C (30 °F), while July is the hottest, with an average annual maximum of 20.2 °C (68.4 °F)]. The lowest mean monthly temperature in Zenica was −6.4 °C (20.5 °F), in January 1964; the minimal, −23.9 °C (−11.0 °F), was in January 1963. The highest mean monthly temperature, 23.8 °C (74.8 °F), was registered in August 2003; the highest daily, 42.6 °C (108.7 °F), was in August 2024. Relative air humidity is 70% and cloudiness 6.1 tenths. Air pressure is 976.3 millibars. Zenica has one meteorological station, founded in 1925 and located at an elevation of 344 m (1,129 ft) above sea level.

Climate data for Zenica, 1991–2020
Month	Jan	Feb	Mar	Apr	May	Jun	Jul	Aug	Sep	Oct	Nov	Dec	Year
Mean daily maximum °C (°F)	4.9 (40.8)	8.6 (47.5)	13.9 (57.0)	19.1 (66.4)	23.7 (74.7)	27.6 (81.7)	29.7 (85.5)	30.1 (86.2)	24.5 (76.1)	19.0 (66.2)	11.7 (53.1)	5.3 (41.5)	18.2 (64.7)
Mean daily minimum °C (°F)	−2.8 (27.0)	−1.8 (28.8)	1.5 (34.7)	5.2 (41.4)	9.4 (48.9)	13.2 (55.8)	14.7 (58.5)	14.6 (58.3)	10.9 (51.6)	6.9 (44.4)	2.9 (37.2)	−1.5 (29.3)	6.1 (43.0)
Average precipitation mm (inches)	54.7 (2.15)	54.1 (2.13)	54.6 (2.15)	69.4 (2.73)	80.5 (3.17)	86.9 (3.42)	83.9 (3.30)	60.3 (2.37)	80.3 (3.16)	70.8 (2.79)	77.3 (3.04)	69.4 (2.73)	842.2 (33.14)
Average precipitation days (≥ 1 mm)	9.2	8.5	8.6	10.0	10.1	10.1	8.7	6.3	8.4	7.7	8.3	9.0	104.9
Source: World Meteorological Organization

=== Ecology ===
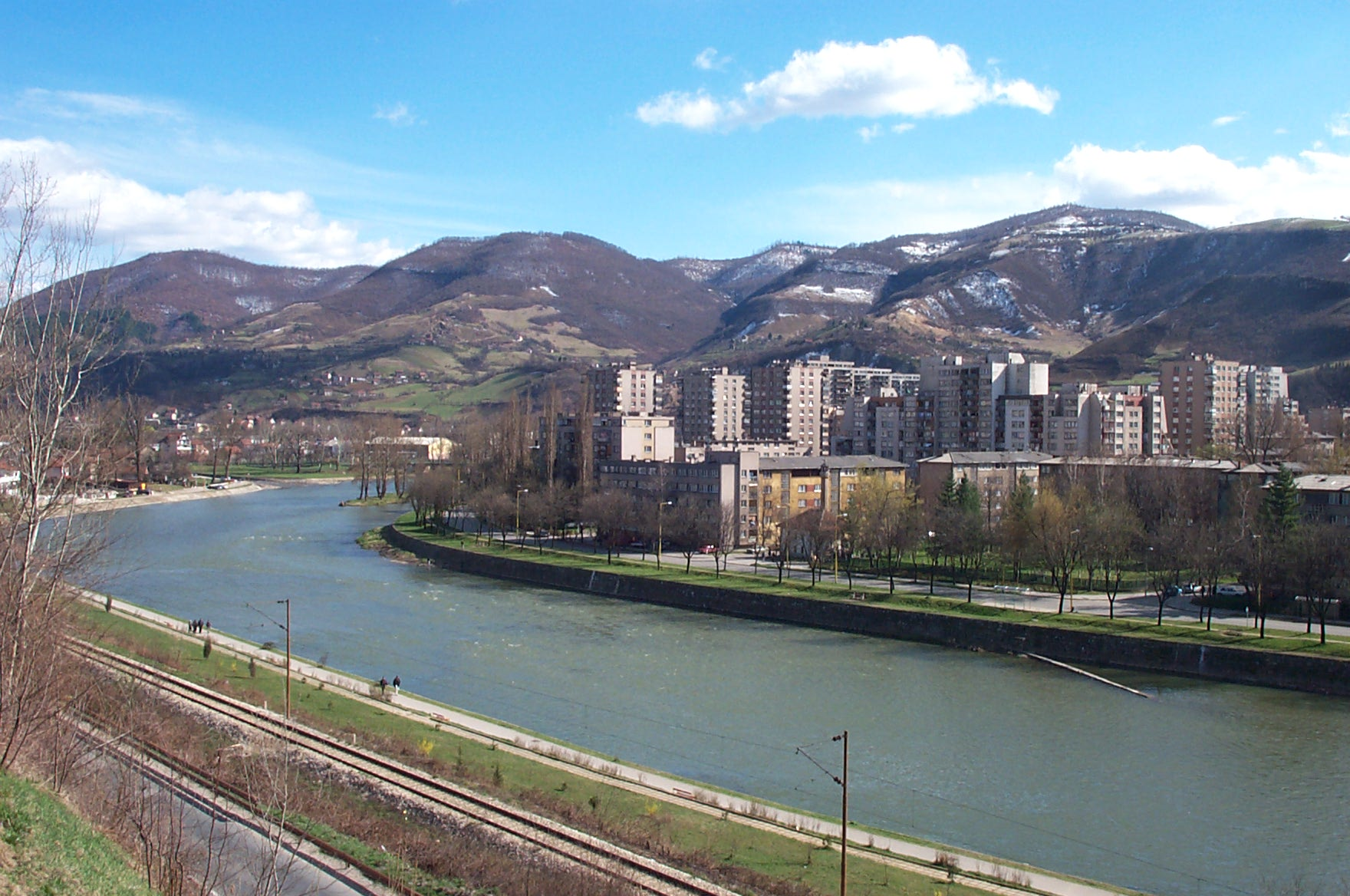
River Bosna in the front: a railway, behind it the settlement of Jalija (right) and farther, Bilimišće (left); in the back: Zenica hills—Krč rocks (right) and others (left)

Zenica's industry has polluted and damaged the city's environment. After the Bosnian War, its main polluter, the ironworks, was incapacitated. However, several years later, the old steelworks partially resumed operations, and a non-partisan citizen organisation called Eko pokret Zenica began to protest it, together with the local branch of the Greens of Bosnia and Herzegovina political party.

The Babina river basin was declared a nature park after the group's intercession. The city has also entertained initiatives to create a dam on the Vranduk. The Greens of Bosnia and Herzegovina and Eko pokret have opposed this as well, declaring the Vranduk a national park.

Mošćanica, the regional waste landfill, is located between the villages of Mošćanica, Mutnica, Palinovići, Briznik, Arnauti, Ponihovo, and Plavčići, southeast of Zenica.

=== Urban settlements ===
The urban part of Zenica consists of the following settlements:

- Jalija
- Odmut
- Mokušnice
- Londža
- Pišće
- Blatuša
- Crkvice
- Babina River [Babina Rijeka] (Old Radakovo)
- New Radakovo [Novo Radakovo]
- Sejmen
- Old Čaršija [Stara Čaršija] (toward Čaršijska mosque)
- New Zenica [Nova Zenica]
- Lukovo Field [Lukovo Polje]

== Demographics ==
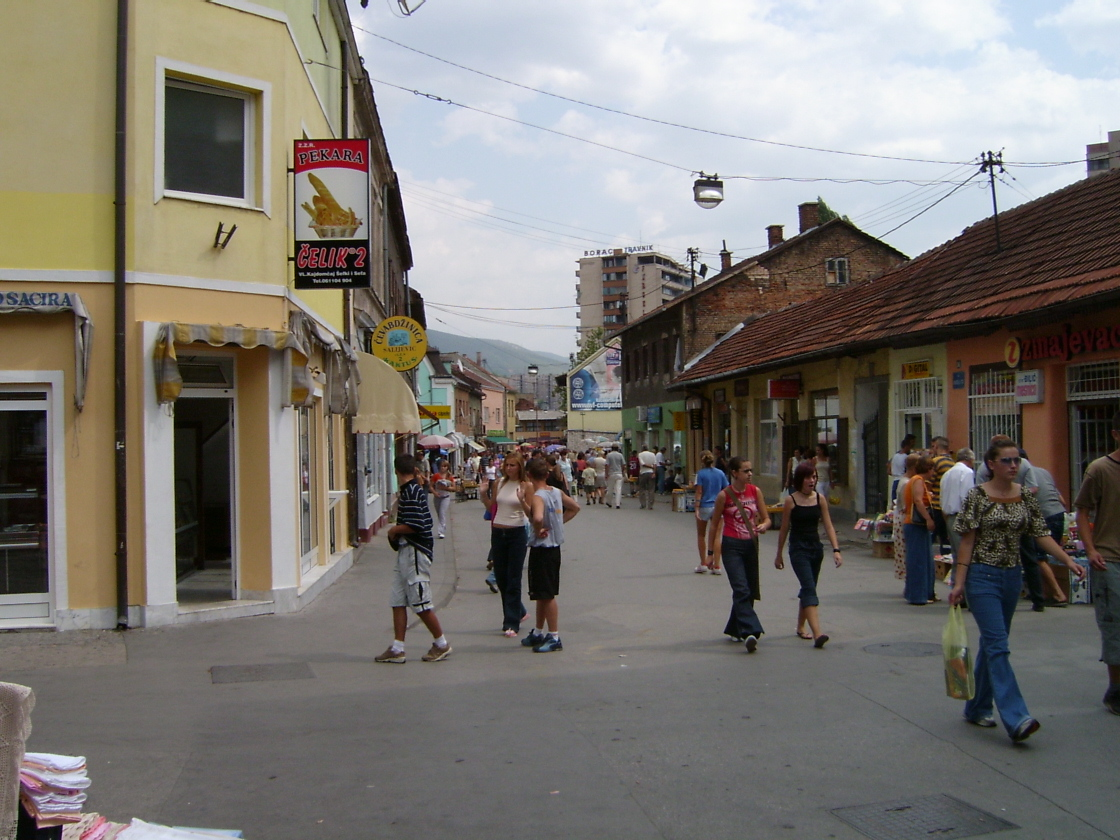
View of a street in Zenica

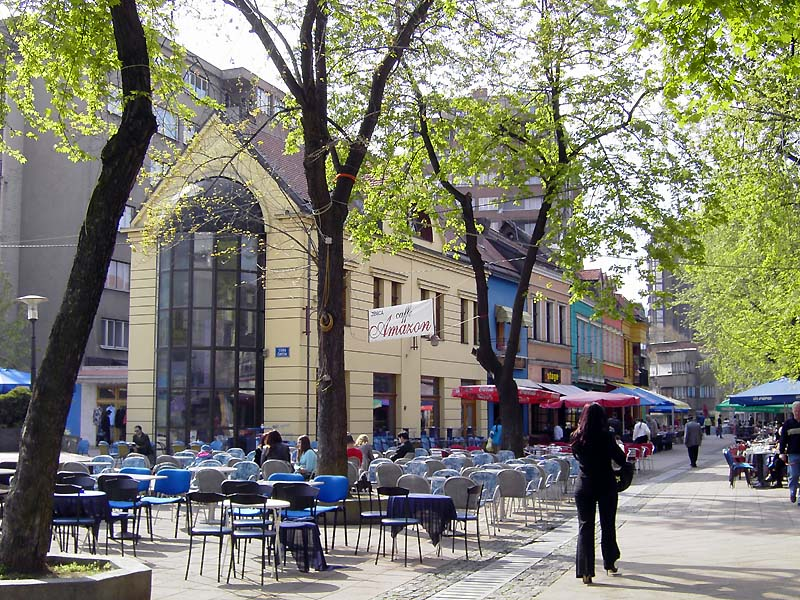
Old Čaršija

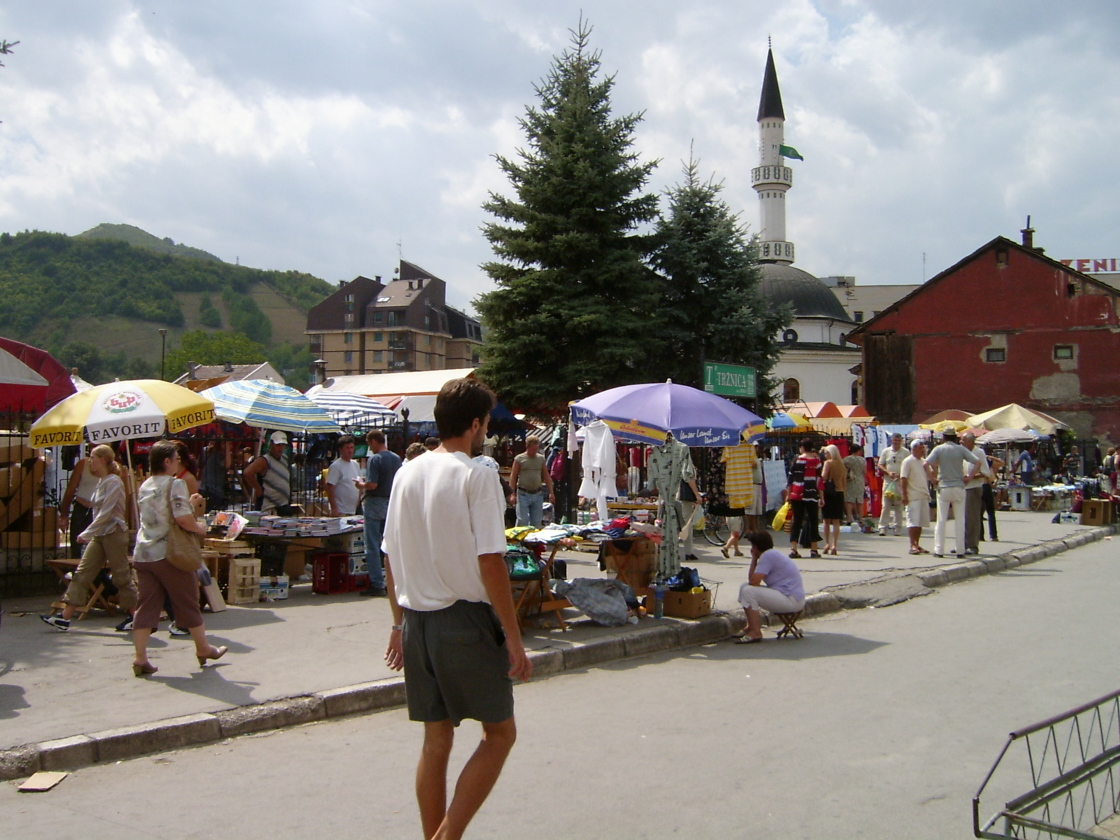
Old Zenica street market and Kočevska mosque

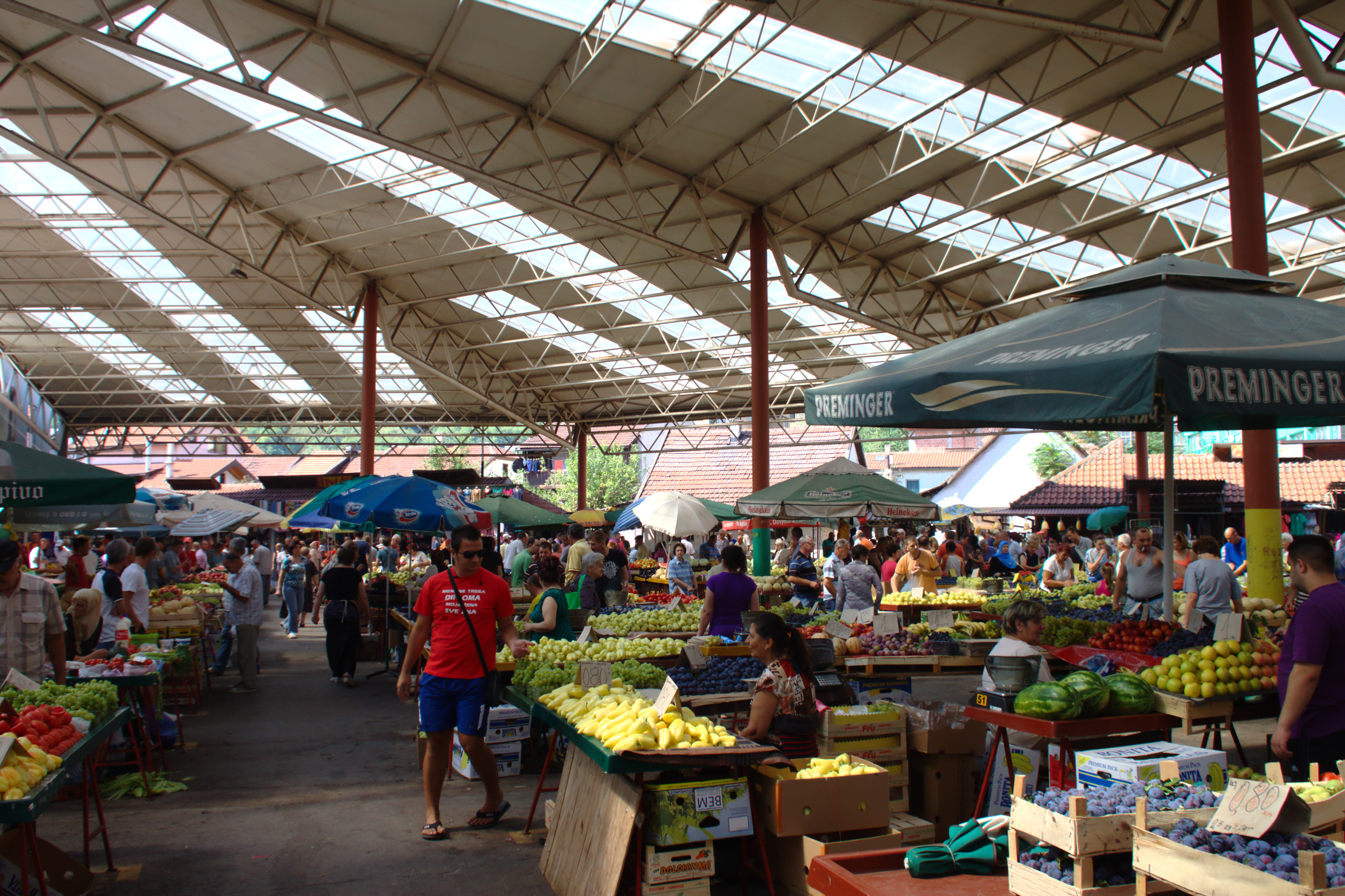
New Zenica renovated roofed bazaar

Zenica's population increased from 7,215 in 1910 to 15,550 in 1948 and 63,869 in 1981.

According to the 1991 population census in Bosnia and Herzegovina, Zenica proper had 96,027 citizens, with the population of the greater municipality being 145,517, living in 81 settlements. According to the 2013 census, Zenica had 70,553 residents (not including Upper Zenica and surrounding villages), while the greater Zenica municipality had 110,663 inhabitants.

=== Population of Zenica city ===
Ethnic composition
Year	Serbs	%	Bosniaks	%	Croats	%	Yugoslavs	%	Others	%	Total
1961	10,525	32.41%	5,908	18.19%	9,393	28.92%	5,517	15.31%	-	-%	32,476
1971	12,779	24.93%	21,365	41.68%	13,250	25.85%	1,945	3.79%	-	-%	51,263
1981	12,728	20.02%	22,146	34.84%	11,716	18.43%	14,437	22.71%	-	-%	63,569
1991	18,312	19.07%	43,154	44.94%	15,809	16.46%	14,703	15.31%	4,049	4.22%	96,027
2013	2,296	3.25%	55,239	78.29%	6,746	9.56%	-	-%	6,272	8.89%	70,553

View source data.

Population of Zenica city
Year	Pop.	±% p.a.
1879	2,101	—
1885	3,073	+6.54%
1910	7,215	+3.47%
1921	7,632	+0.51%
1948	15,550	+2.67%
1953	28,961	+13.24%
1961	32,476	+1.44%
1971	51,263	+4.67%
1981	63,569	+2.17%
1991	96,027	+4.21%
2013	70,553	−1.39%

=== Population of the municipality ===
Ethnic composition
Year	Serbs	%	Bosniaks	%	Croats	%	Yugoslavs	%	Others	%	Total
1961	20,369	24.15%	31,177	36.97%	20,509	24.32%	10,755	12.75%	-	-%	84,341
1971	21,875	19.45%	61,204	54.43%	24,658	21.93%	2,133	1.90%	2,577	2.29%	112,447
1981	21,204	15.97%	66,930	50.42%	23,595	17.78%	17,536	13.21%	-	-%	132,733
1991	22,592	15.52%	80,377	55.21%	22,651	15.56%	15,651	10.75%	4,306	2.96%	145,577
2013	2,409	2.17%	92,988	84.02%	8,279	7.48%	-	-%	6,987	6.31%	110,663

View source data.

Population of Zenica City (Municipality till 2014)
Year	Pop.	±% p.a.
1879	4,174	—
1885	6,261	+6.99%
1910	10,637	+2.14%
1921	11,211	+0.48%
1948	35,399	+4.35%
1953	38,152	+1.51%
1961	84,341	+10.42%
1971	112,447	+2.92%
1981	132,733	+1.67%
1991	145,577	+0.93%
2013	110,663	−1.24%

=== Common surnames ===
In Zenica-Doboj Canton, as of February 2020, the most common surnames are as follows:

1. Hodžić
2. Halilović
3. Delić
4. Spahić
5. Bašić
6. Imamović
7. Kovačević
8. Kadrić
9. Tadić
10. Marković
11. Babić
12. Begić
13. Alić
14. Šehić
15. Selimović
16. Beganović
17. Hadžić
18. Muratović
19. Tomić
20. Šišić
21. Dedić
22. Karić
23. Smajić
24. Sinanović
25. Jukić
26. Vidović
27. Ramić
28. Dizdarević
29. Brkić
30. Softić
31. Avdić
32. Pavlović
33. Matijević
34. Bošnjak
35. Pašalić
36. Šabanović
37. Fejzić
38. Radić
39. Kovač
40. Lukić
41. Petrović
42. Hasić

== Economy ==
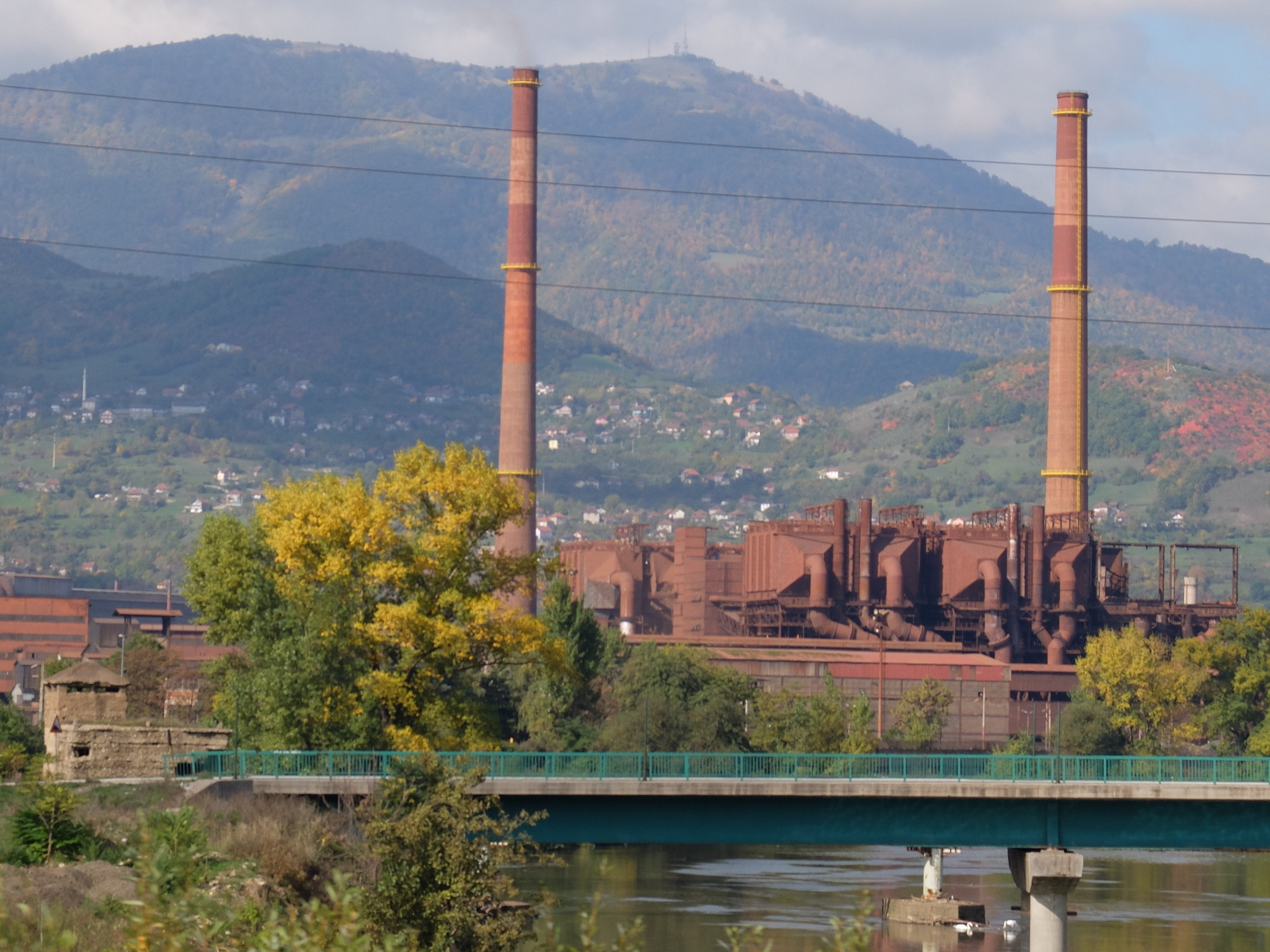
Zenica steelworks

Zenica is an industrial center. The main types of industry in the city are iron and steel production, as well as coal mining. Extraction of brown coal in Zenica began in 1880 and production of steel in 1892.

In 1990, the municipality produced 1.4 million tons of steel, 924,000 tons of coal, 1,018,000 m^{2} (10,960,000 ft^{2}) of cloth, and 158,000 hL of milk, among other commodities. Employed workers numbered 49,415–53,419 in the civil sector and 4,004 in the private sector.

Even though the Bosnian War (1992–1995) did not cause as much destruction to Zenica as it did elsewhere, it damaged the economy. This is reflected in the interruption of steel processing and a decrease in its production.

Farming and cattle breeding are a significant component of the city's economy, with potatoes, carrots, onions, corn, and wheat being the most commonly grown crops.

== Politics ==
=== Official symbols ===
Zenica coat of arms and flag (variant, with the crescent moon coloured yellow)

Zenica flag

The City of Zenica has a coat of arms and a flag.

The coat of arms bears several symbols that represent the city of Zenica. On the left side, following the frame, the contour of the Bosna river can be seen, cut by two horizontal lines in the lower part—a symbol of communication. Within the main portion of the shield, there are four circular symbols. Clockwise: the symbol of Vranduk—the northern gate of the city; one of the six crosses from ban Kulin's plate and a symbol of Christianity; a crescent moon—symbol of Islam and the Ottoman period; and crossed hammers—a symbol of coal mining and heavy industry. The city's flag is in the shape of a rectangle divided into a yellow upper part and a light green bottom, colours that match the coat of arms, which is positioned in the centre.

=== Governance: seats of administration ===
The city of Zenica is administered by the Authority of the City of Zenica and the seat of the City of Zenica (Municipality until 2014). The Authority consists of a City Mayor (Municipality Mayor until 2014), the Council of the City of Zenica (Municipality Council until 2014), and the City Attorney's Office (Municipality Attorney's Office until 2014).

==== Mayors and city mayors ====
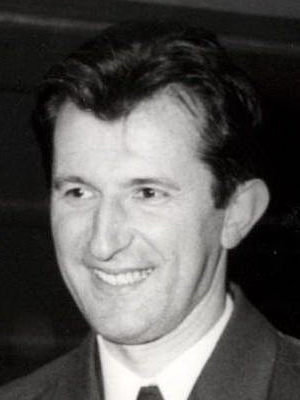
Abdulah Mutapčić (b. 1932),
24th mayor (1970–1974)

Below is a list of former Zenica mayors (1–36+) and city mayors.

1. Suljo Arnaut (1878)
2. Ahmetaga Mutapčić (1889–1895)
3. Esad Alikadić (1898–1905)
4. Ali Harmandić (1906–1913)
5. Mahmud Tarabar (1913–1917)
6. Osman Mutapčić (1917–1923)
7. Ivo Ghey (1923–1925)
8. Ahmed Mutapčić (1926–1931)
9. Abdulaziz Asko Borić (1932–1935)
10. Eniz Mutapčić (1935–1936)
11. Mehmedalija Tarabar (1936–1941)
12. Ismet Salčinović (1941–1946)
13. Mustafa Čolaković (1945)
14. Mustafa Mujagić (1945)
15. Abdulaziz Asko Borić (1945–1946)
16. Jozo Marčinković (1946–1948)
17. Veljko Bilanović (1949–1950)
18. Nikola Spaić (1951–1952)
19. Safet Uzunović (1952–1955)
20. Đuro Vekić (1955–1959)
21. Milko Križanović (1959–1960)
22. Ezher Ezo Arnautović (1960–1965)
23. Vinko Jelčić (1965–1966)
24. Muhamed Berberović (1966–1970)
25. Abdulah Mutapčić (1970–1974)
26. Vinko Jelčić (1974–1978)
27. Nikola Mirković (1978–1982)
28. Salim Tarabar (1982–1983)
29. Muhamed Pašalić (1983–1984)
30. Nikola Telebak (1984–1985)
31. Omer Filipović (1986–1988)
32. Bogdan Kolar (1988–1990)
33. Ibrahim Alispahić (1990–1992)
34. Besim Spahić (1992–1997)
35. Ferid Alić (1997–2000)
36. Zakir Pašalić (2000–2004)
37. Husejin Smajlović (2004–2016)
38. Fuad Kasumović (2016–present)

== Culture ==
Monuments of Zenica NOB
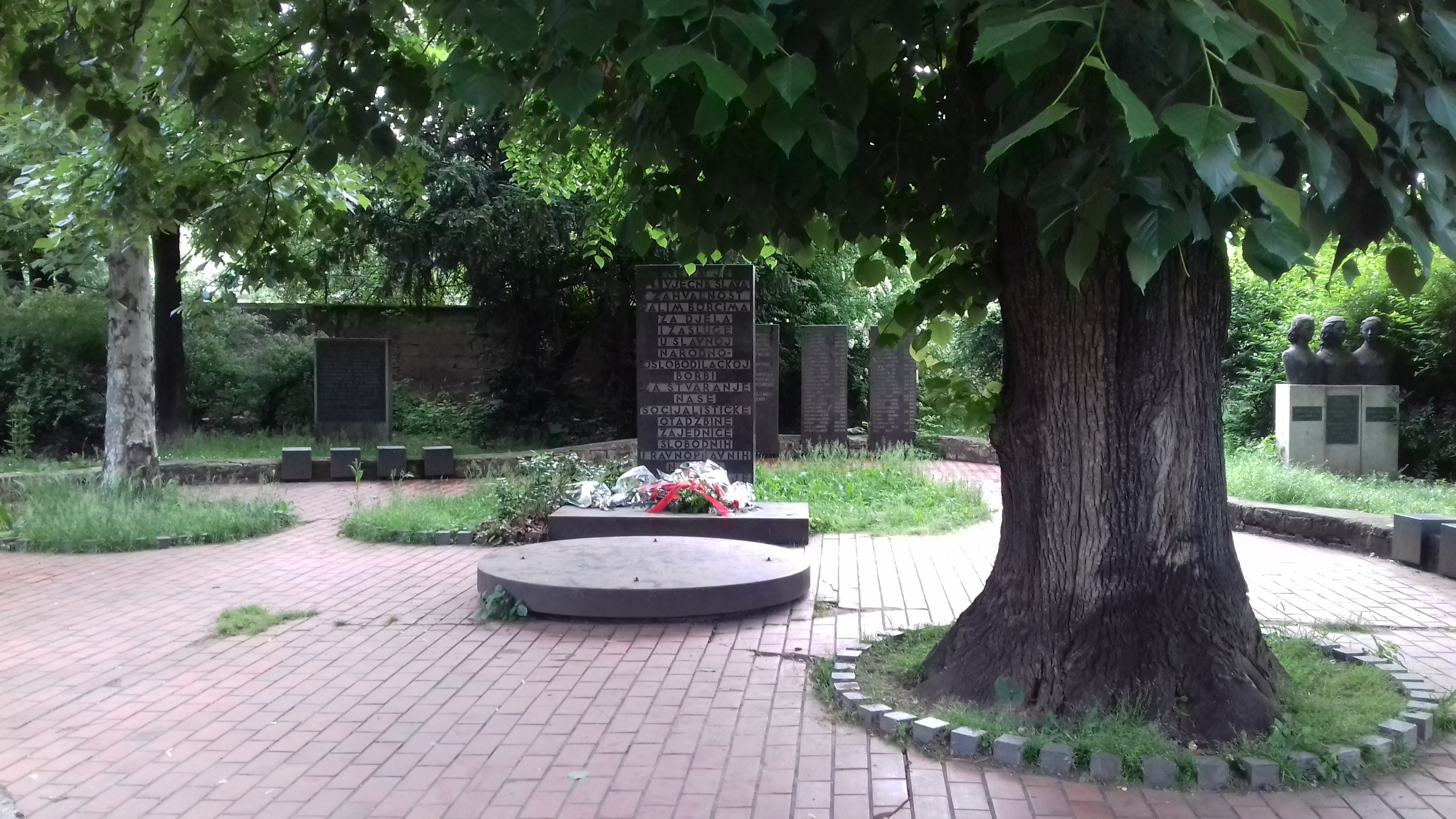
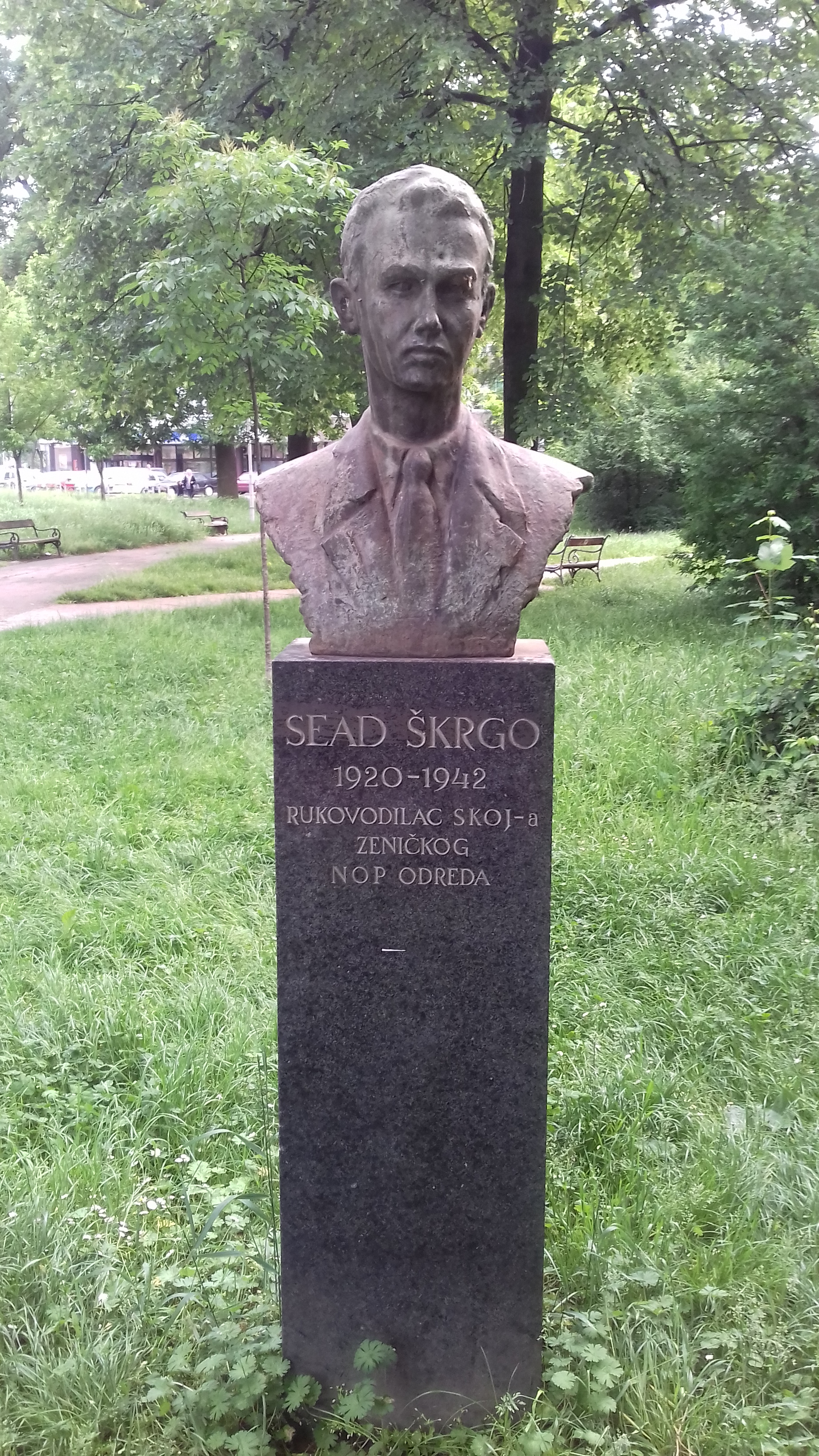

Zenica has the following institutions of cultural importance: the Camera Symphony Orchestra, Bosnian People's Theater, Youth chorus, Art gallery, and Museum of the City of Zenica.

The Zenica branch of the Croat culture society Napredak ("advancement") has since 2010 organized annual Easter events. Another regular Easter event that takes place is the "Festival of rakijas and liqueurs".

The pop-rock band Nemoguće Vruće is from Zenica, as are several members of the reggae/dub/rock group Dubioza kolektiv.

Prvomajska budnica ("first-May" wake) is an annual traditional event in the honor of a 1886 International Workers' Day strike; it has been held since 1926.

=== National monuments ===
There are several national monuments in Zenica:

- Church of the Nativity of Our Lady
- St. Elijah Church
- Former Zenica paper factory
- Plate of the great judge Gradeša
- Sejmenska mosque
- Old mosque
- Vranduk fortress
- Sultan Ahmedova mosque

== Attractions ==
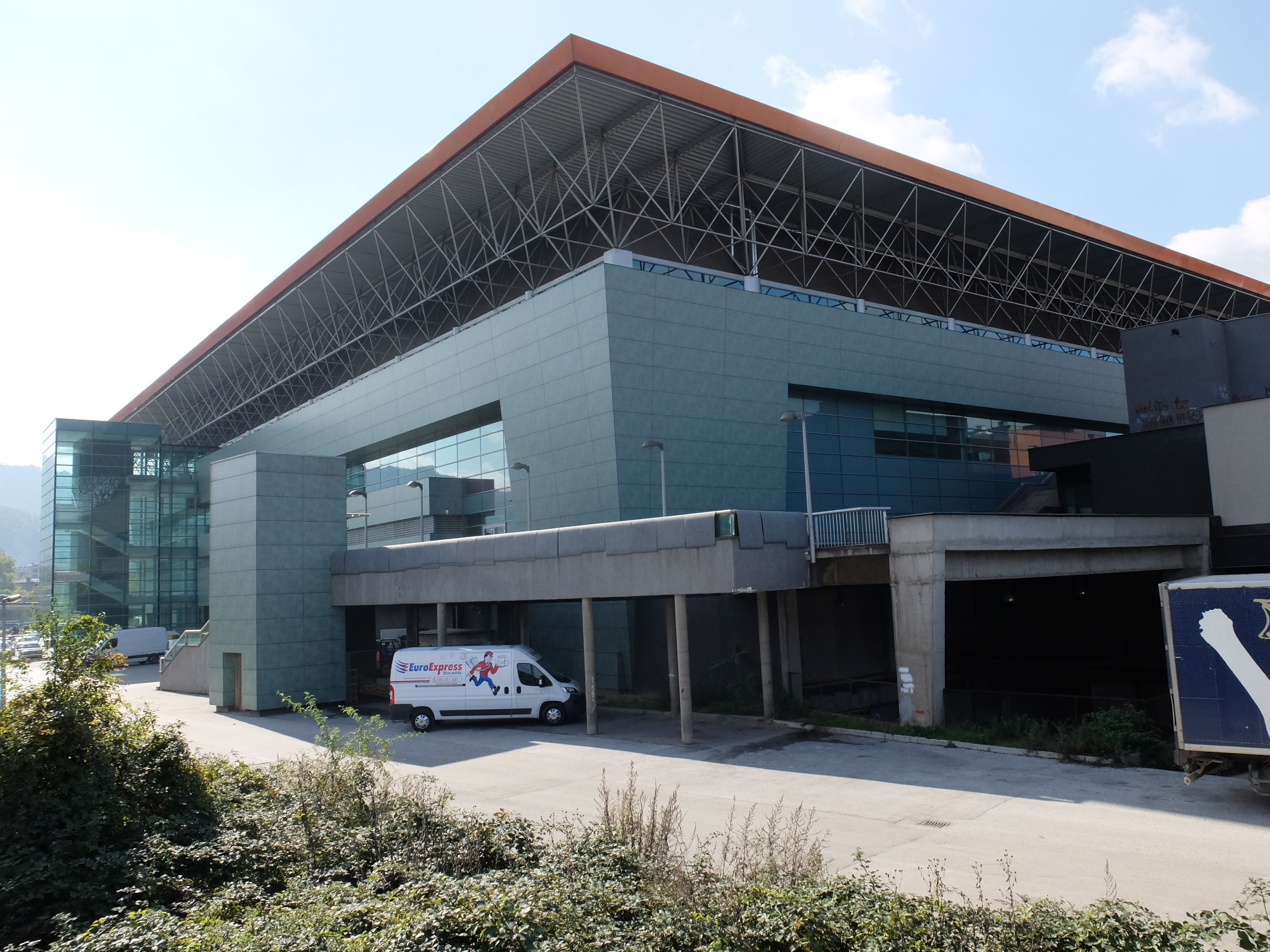
Arena Zenica

- Zenica Synagogue
- Zenica prison
- Arena Zenica
- NK Čelik Zenica football club
- Bilino Polje Stadium football stadium
- Lamela, Zenica residential building

== Sports ==
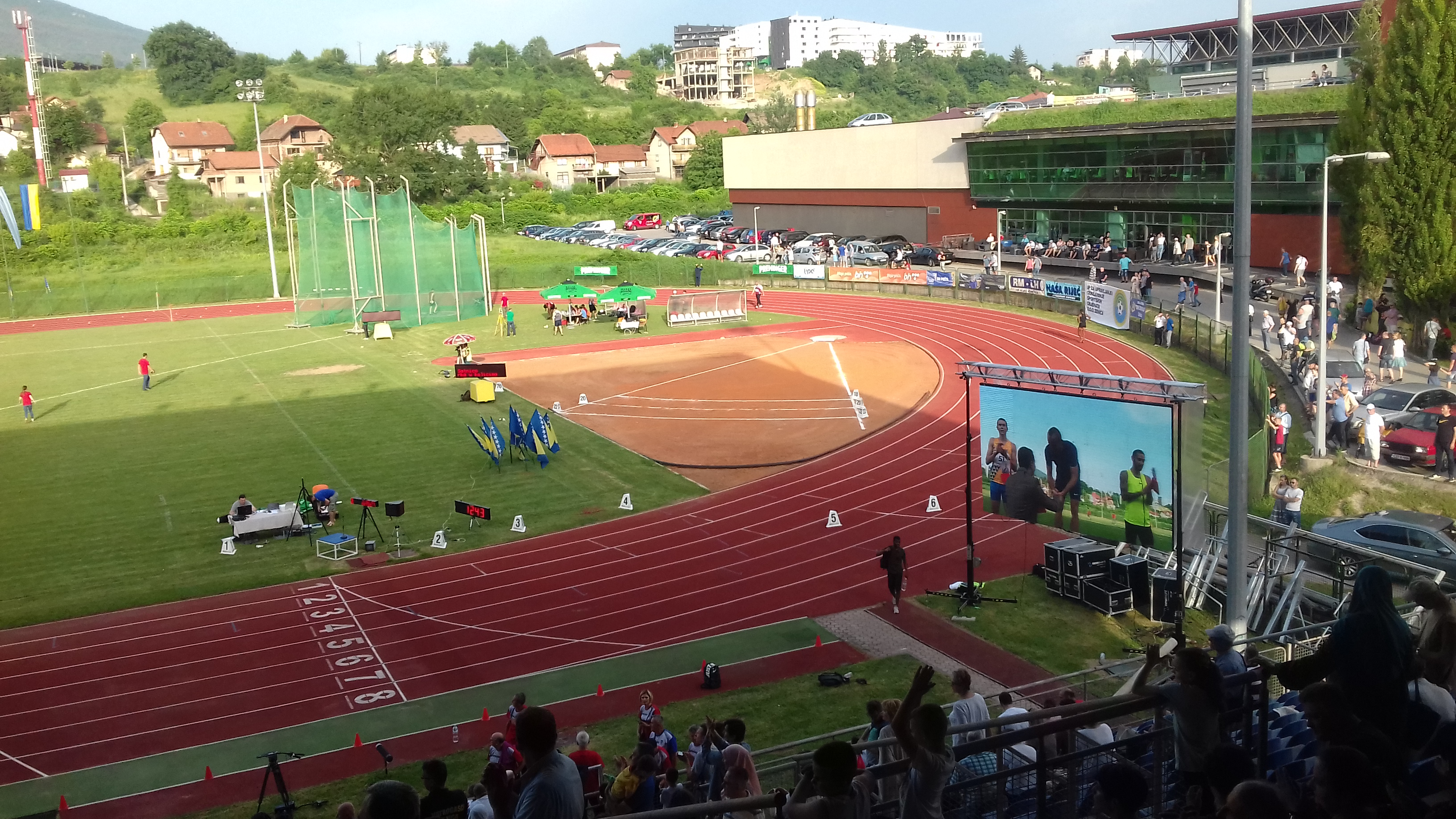
Athletic stadium at Kamberovića polje

Zenica has a variety of sports facilities and clubs, and its athletic teams have performed and won trophies nationally and overseas.

The NK Čelik Zenica football club is a two-time winner of the former Central European Cup and has thrice been state champion. The town's rugby team has also won several national championships. Notable local athletes include tennis player Mervana Jugić, high jumper Elvir Krehmić, karateka Arnel Kalušić, and basketball player Tarik Biberović.

=== Scouting ===
Scouts (Izviđači) are a children's and youth movement run by adult members of the organization. Scouts mainly learn to form relationships with each other as well as various other useful skills, both related to living in nature and in an urban environment. In 2017, the Zenica scouting organization marked its 65th anniversary. Since its founding, about 100,000 young people have passed through its ranks.

=== Club list ===
- Atletski klub "Zenica" [athletics]
- Biciklistički klub "Zenica – Metalno" [cycling]
- Bokserski klub "Čelik" [boxing]
- Invalidski odbojkaški klub "Bosna" [disabled volleyball]
- Džudo klub "Policajac" [Judo]
- Karate klub "Hasen-do"
- Karate klub "Zenica – Mladost"
- Karate klub "Nico"
- Košarkaški invalidski klub "Bosna" [disabled basketball]
- Klub borilačkih vještina "Isak" [martial arts]
- Klub ekstremnih sportova "Scorpio" [extreme sports]
- Košarkaški klub "Čelik" (žene) [women's basketball]
- Košarkaški klub "Čelik" [basketball]
- Košarkaški klub "Željezara – Zenica" (žene) [women's basketball]
- Klub sjedeće odbojke "Zenica 92" [sitting volleyball]
- Malonogomentni klub "Drugari" [futsal]
- Fudbalski klub "Borac" (Tetovo) [football]
- Fudbalski klub "Iris" (žene) [women's football]
- Fudbalski klub "Čelik" [football]
- Fudbalski klub "Nemila" [football]
- Fudbalski klub "Zenica 97" [football]
- Fudbalski klub "Zlatni ljiljan" [football]
- Fudbalski klub "Željezničar" [football]
- Odbojkaški klub "Zenica" [volleyball]
- Odbojkaški klub "Ruki" [volleyball]
- Plivački klub "Željezara" [swimming]
- Rafting klub "Žara" [rafting]
- Rafting klub "Bosna" [rafting]
- Ragbi klub "Čelik" [rugby]
- Ragbi klub "Rudar" [rugby]
- Ragbi klub "Zenica 72" [rugby]
- Rukometni klub "Čelik" [handball]
- Smučarski klub "Zenica" [skiing]
- Stonoteniski klub "Mladost" [table tennis]
- Stonoteniski klub "Željezara" [table tennis]
- Streljački klub "Zenica" [shooting]
- Teniski klub "Čelik" [tennis]
- Tekvondo klub "Zenica" [taekwondo]
- Udruženje građana sportskih ribolovaca RD "Bistro" Zenica [fishing]

== Transportation and infrastructure ==
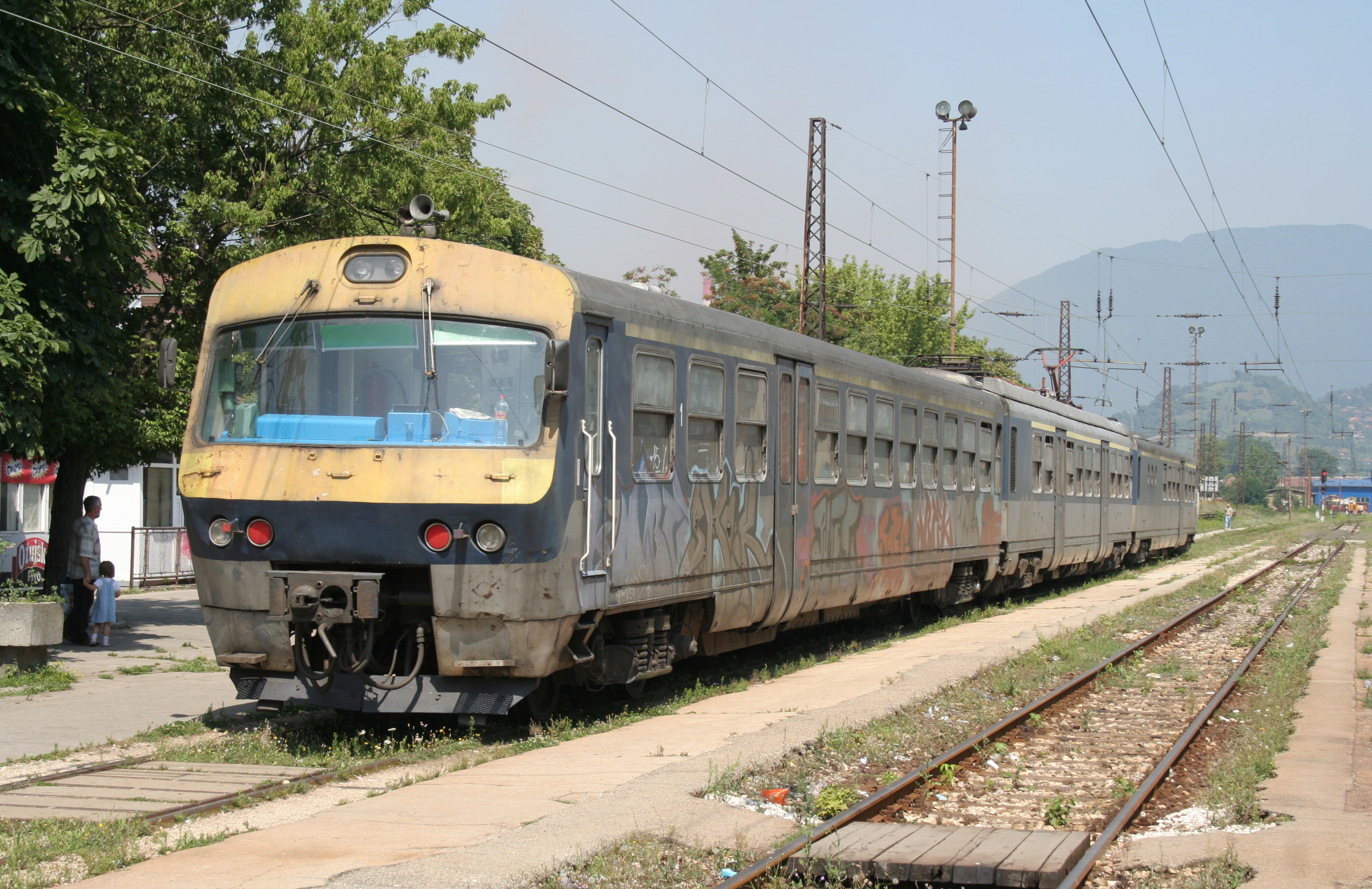
Electric train in Zenica

Zenica is connected with Sarajevo [70 km (43 mi) southeast] by railway and road lines—both of which follow the valley of the Bosna river. Highway А1 connects Zenica with Sarajevo and Mostar. The railway follows further to the south, and terminates at the coast in Ploče (Croatia).

The most important infrastructure and transportation companies in Zenica (all d.o.o.) are Almy Gradnja, ITC, Arcon, Arel, Uniprojekt Komerc – Inžinjering, Komgrad – Ze, Almy-transport, Geosonda, Engra, and ŽGP – Zenica.

The closest airport is Sarajevo International Airport.

In 2019, the city began rebuilding the Vranduk tunnel.

== Education ==
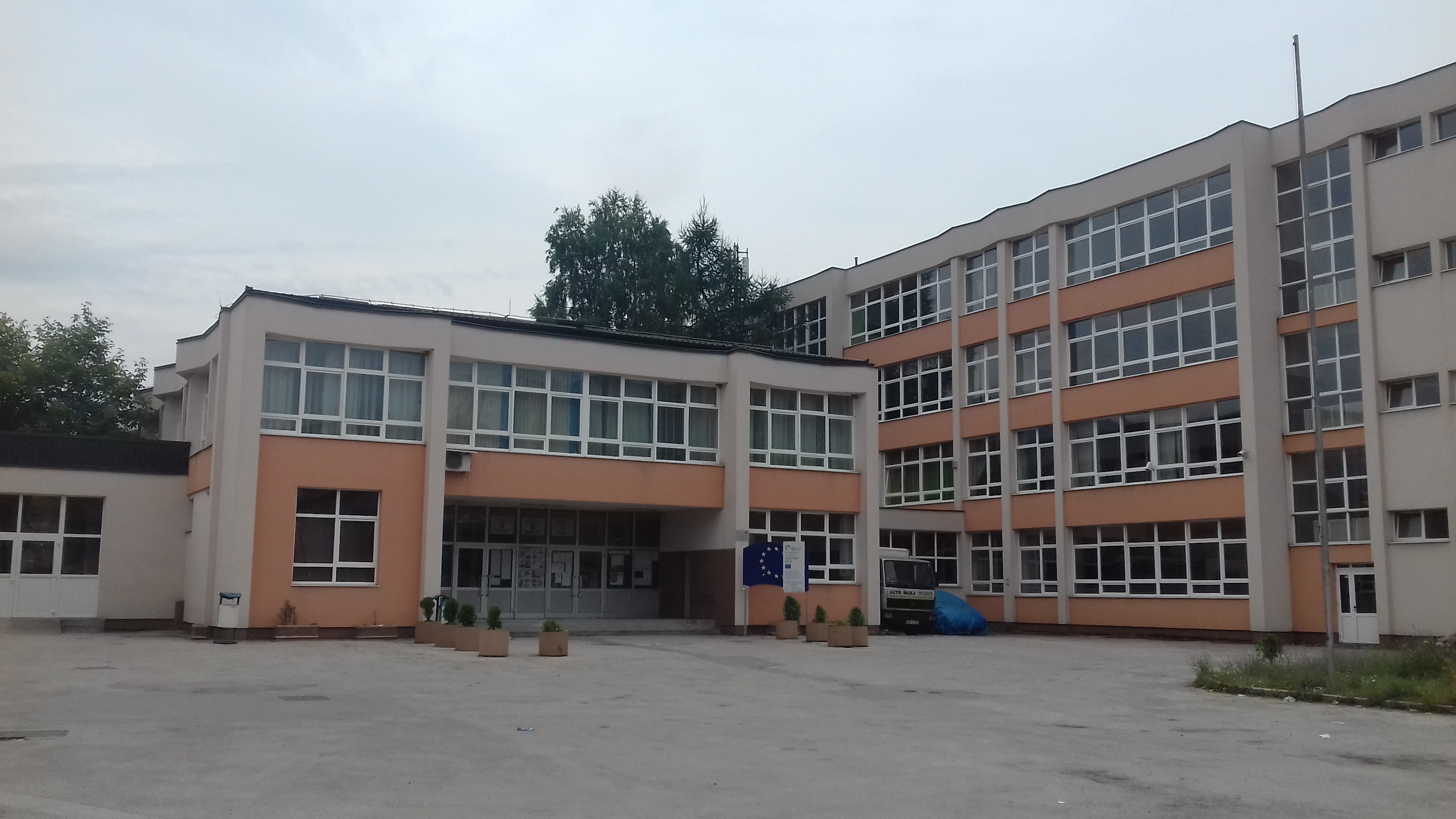
Technical high school on Bilimišće

There are nineteen elementary and twelve high schools in Zenica. The University of Zenica consists of several faculties: Mechanical Engineering, Metallurgy and Materials, Philosophy, Law, Economics, Medicine, Islamic Pedagogy, and Polytechnic.

== Media ==
The city has a public radio and television station, RTV Zenica, a free local newspaper, Superinfo, and it distributes the official gazette Službene novine Grada Zenica. The national publications Dnevni avaz, Oslobođenje, and Naša riječ also have local branches in Zenica.

== Notable people ==
- Hasiba Agić, Sevdalinka folk singer
- Bruno Akrapović, former football player
- Hamza Alić, shot putter – Balkan champion and European silver medalist
- Teoman Alibegović, basketball player
- Anabela Basalo, writer
- Sandra Bagarić, soprano and TV presenter
- Kenan Bajramović, basketball player
- Mensur Bajramović, basketball coach
- Tarik Biberović, basketball player
- Elvir Bolić, former football player
- Senad Brkić, football player
- Ante Budimir, football player
- Aljoša Buha, bass player, member of Crvena jabuka
- Jasmin Burić, football player
- Dragan Čavić, Serb politician, fifth President of Republika Srpska (2002–2006)
- Jasmin Dizdar, film director
- Tarik Filipović, actor and TV presenter
- Nikolina Grabovac, basketball player (Croatia)
- Ahmet Hadžipašić, former Prime Minister of the Federation of Bosnia and Herzegovina (2003–2008)
- Adnan Harmandić, handball player
- Esad Hećimović, investigative journalist
- Arif Heralić, metal worker famous for having his face is on the 1955–1981 Yugoslavian 1,000 dinar banknote
- Mirsad Hibić, former football player
- Mirjana Horvat, sport shooter
- Branimir Hrgota, football player (Sweden)
- Amar Gile, pop-folk singer
- Darko Jelčić, drummer, member of Crvena jabuka
- Mervana Jugić-Salkić, tennis player
- Edin Karamazov, lute player
- Dubioza kolektiv, ska/reggae/rock/hip-hop band
- Elvir Krehmić, high jumper
- Mladen Krstajić, football player, Partizan Belgrade (Serbia)
- Igor Laikert, Bosnian-Herzegovinian alpine skier
- Otto Lang, skier and American film producer
- Dejan Lovren, football player (Croatia)
- Danijel Ljuboja, theater actor, member of the ZKM ensemble (Croatia)
- Emir Mutapčić, former basketball player and coach
- Ivan Opačak, basketball player
- Semir Osmanagić, archaeologist
- Srećko Pejović, sport shooter
- Mesud Pezer, shot putter
- Vanja Plisnić, basketball player (Serbia)
- Senad Podojak, imam and Quran reciter
- Emir Preldžić, basketball player
- Milorad Ratković, former football player – European cup winner
- Hasan Rizvić, basketball player (Slovenia)
- Nermin Šabić, football player
- Zoran Savić, former basketball player – Olympic silver medalist, world and European champion; general manager of Barcelona (Spain)
- Vuka Šeherović, folk singer
- Ivan Šunjić, Croatian football player
- Danis Tanović, film director, Oscar winner
- Amel Tuka, middle-distance runner
- Siniša Ubiparipović, former football player (US)
- Nemoguće Vruće, rock band
- Jovan Ćulibrk

== International relations ==
Zenica is twinned (as 'Partner Cities', by 'Twinning Charter') with the following international cities:

- Gelsenkirchen, Germany
- Hunedoara, Romania
- Üsküdar, Turkey
- Karşıyaka, Turkey
- Luleå, Sweden
- Zalaegerszeg, Hungary
- Fiorenzuola d'Arda, Italy
- Veles, North Macedonia
- Jajce, Bosnia and Herzegovina
- Ödemiş, Turkey

== Gallery ==
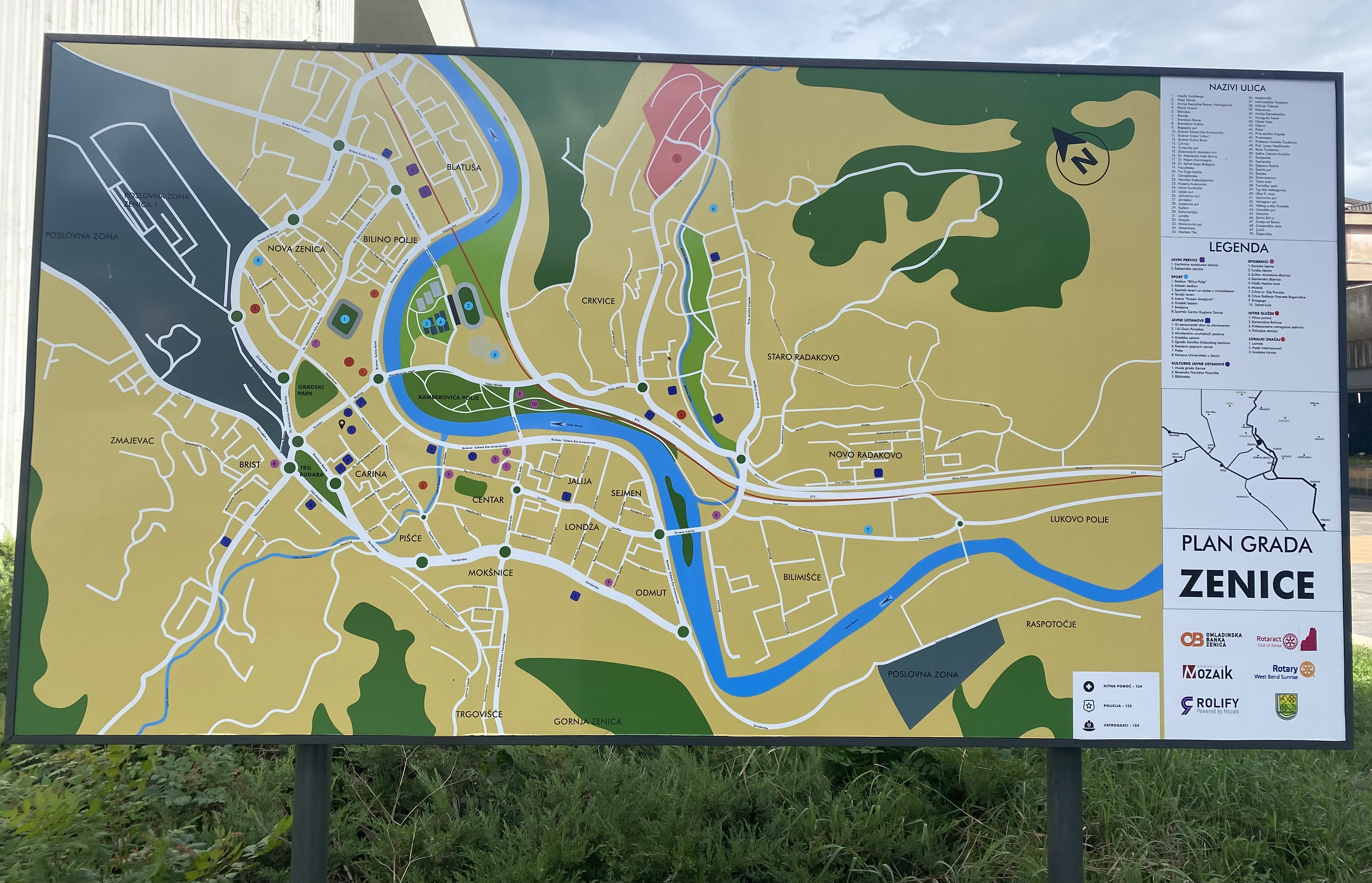
City map

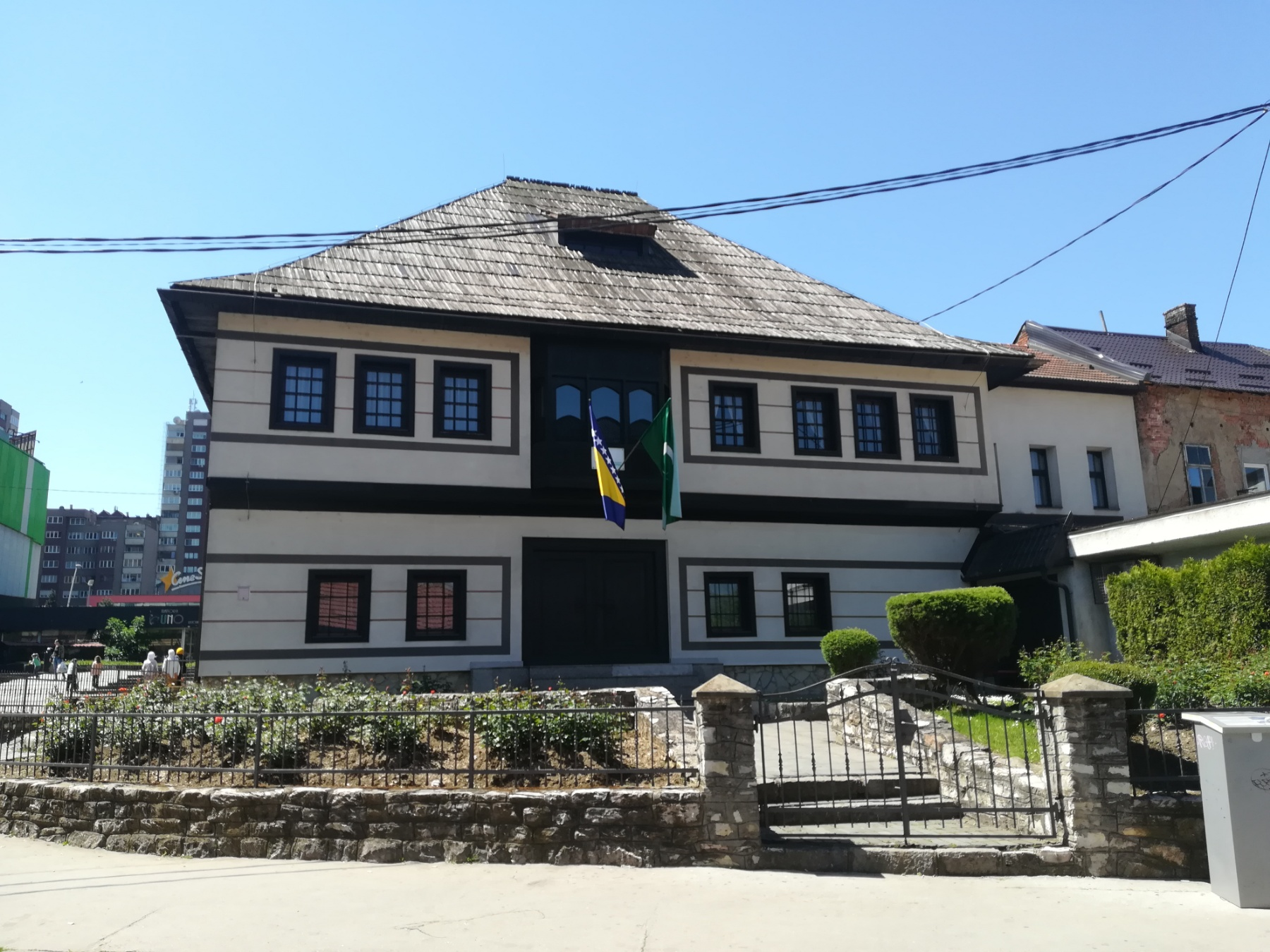
Hadži Mazića house

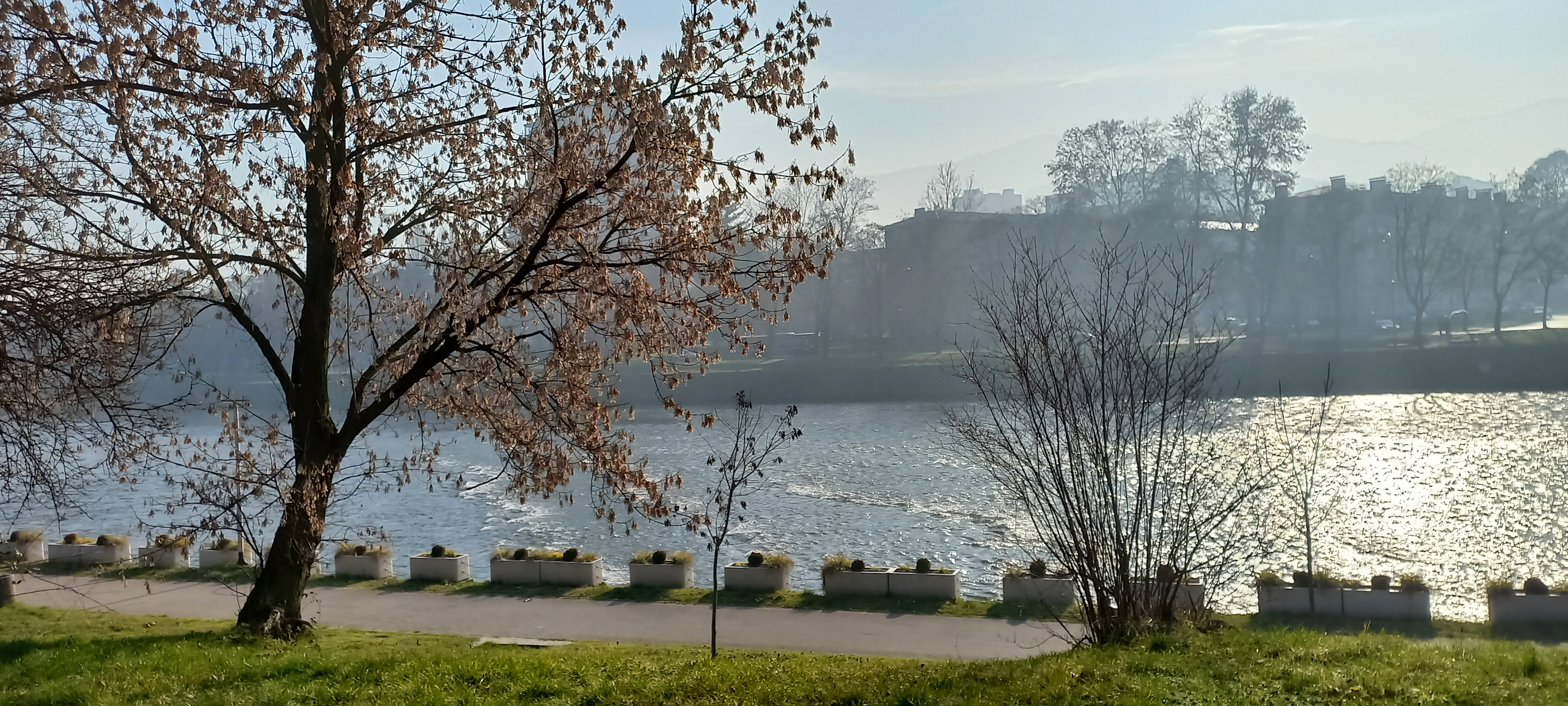
"Ušće" promenade along the Bosna River

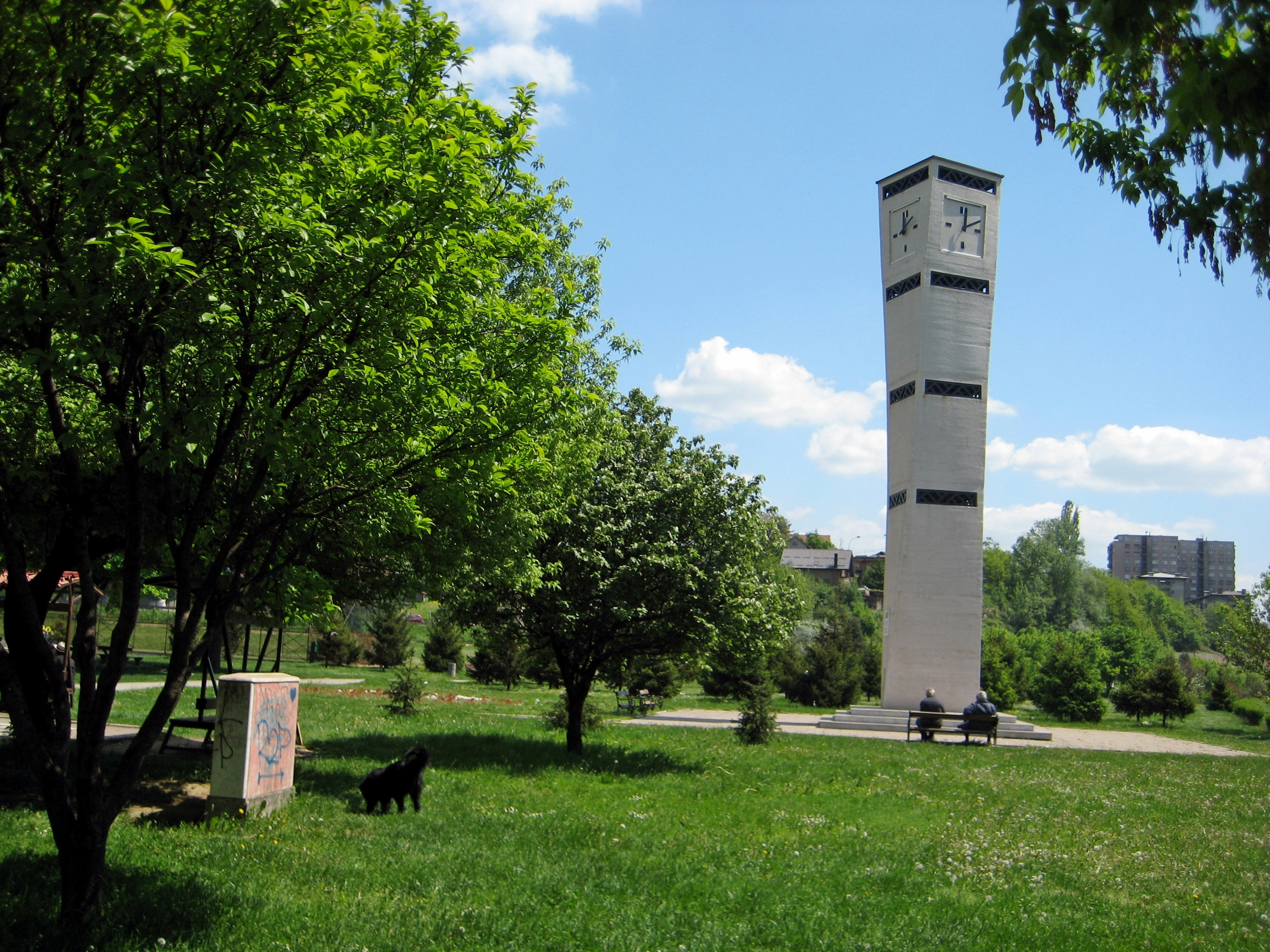
Sahat-kula (clock tower) on Kamberovića polje

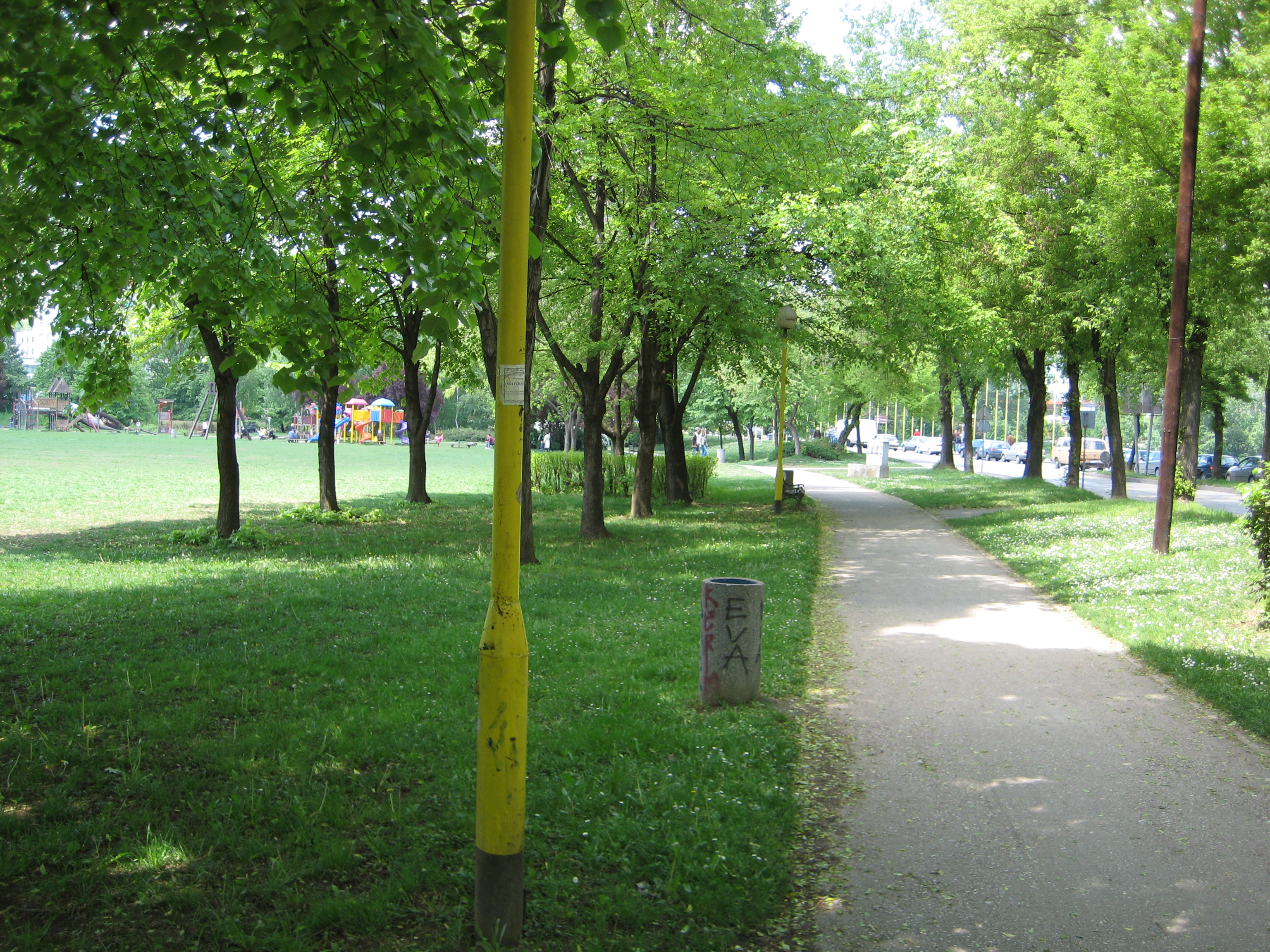
Kamberovića polje (park), near Bilino Stadium polje

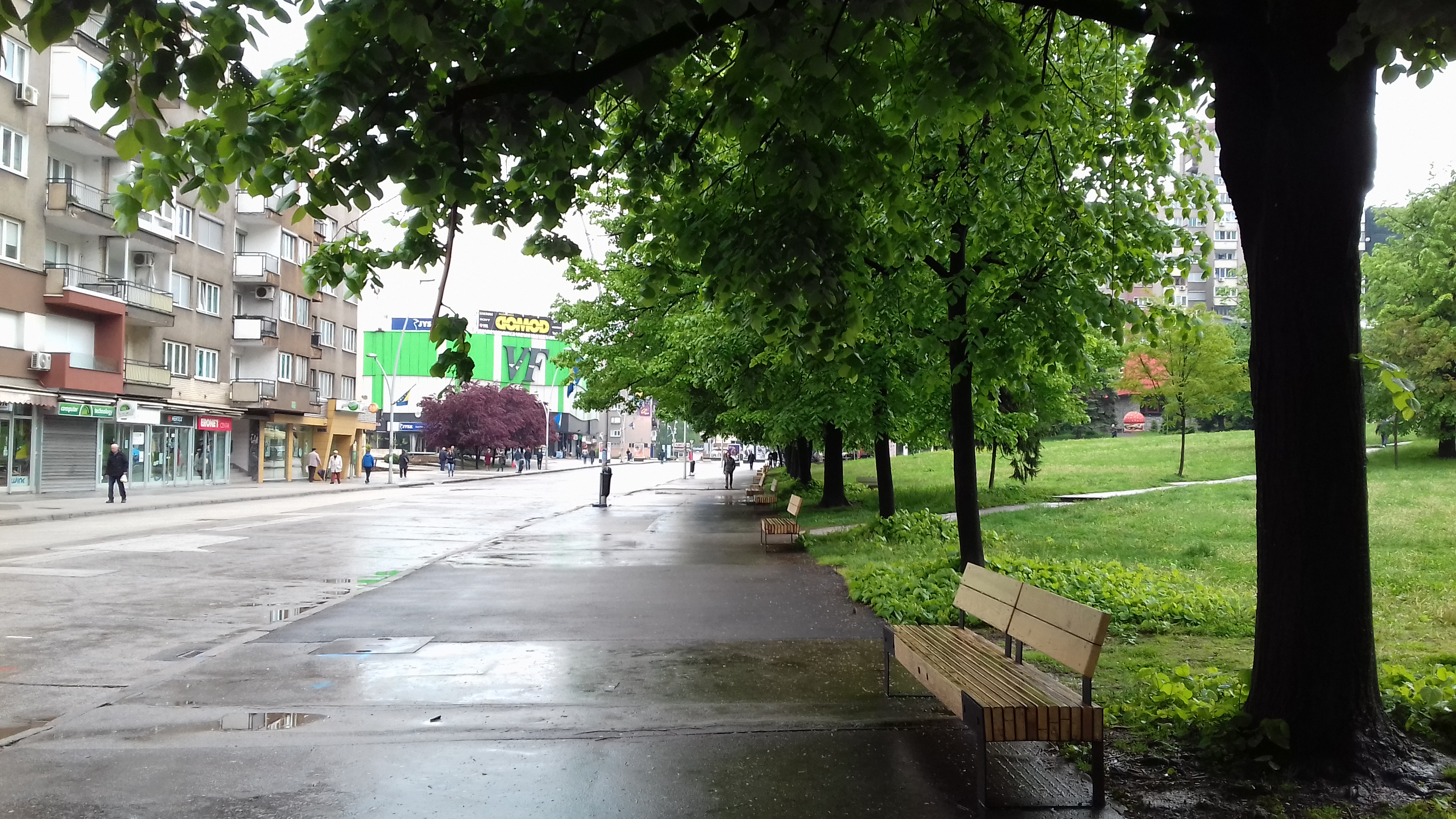
Čaršija, downtown area; Bosanka mall

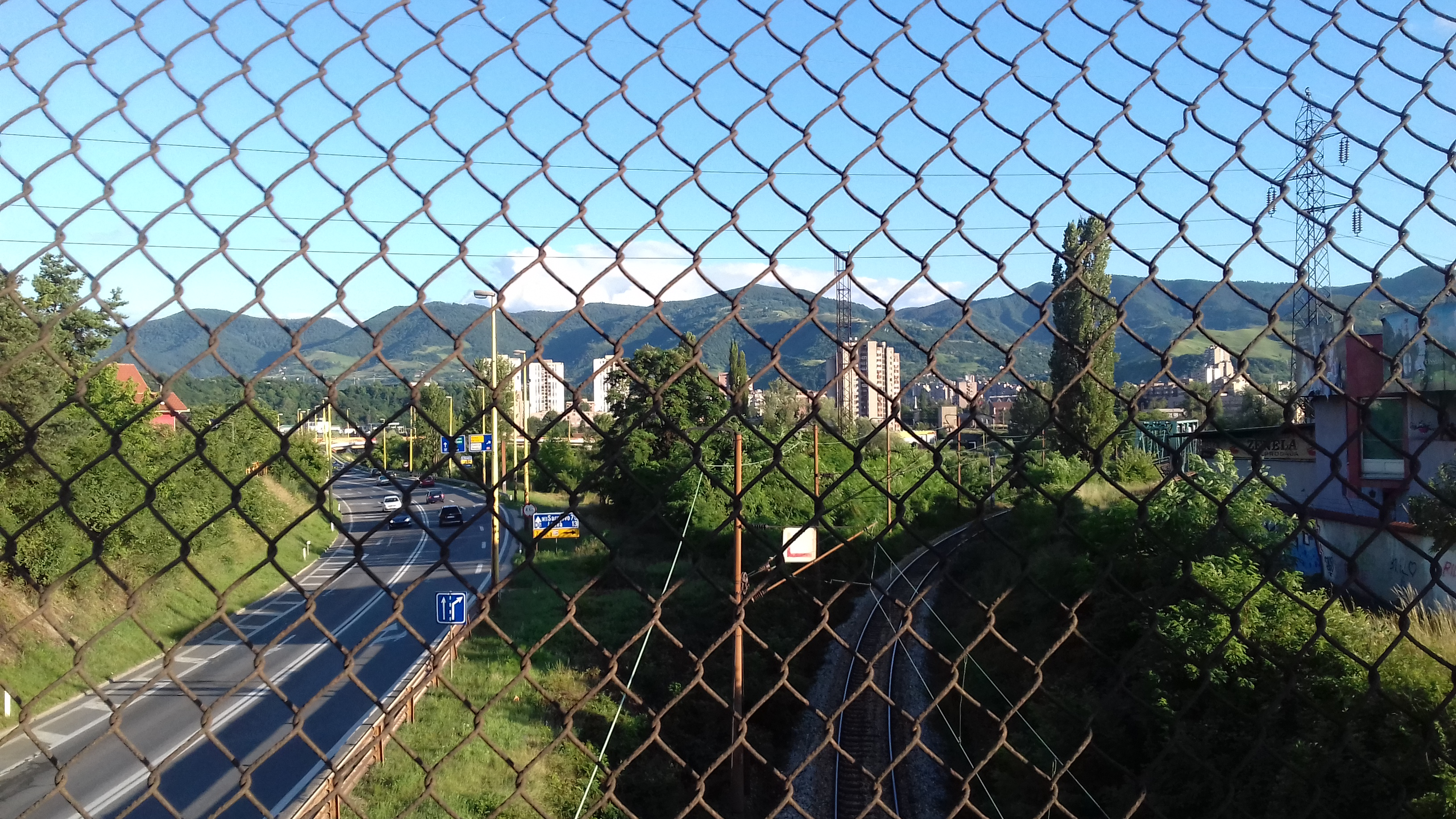
View of the city from Pehare

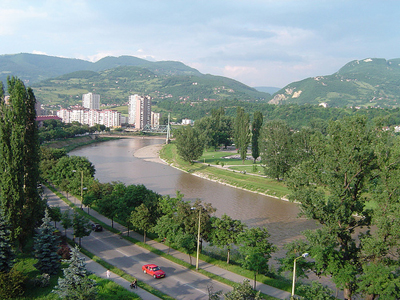
Bosna boulevard and river

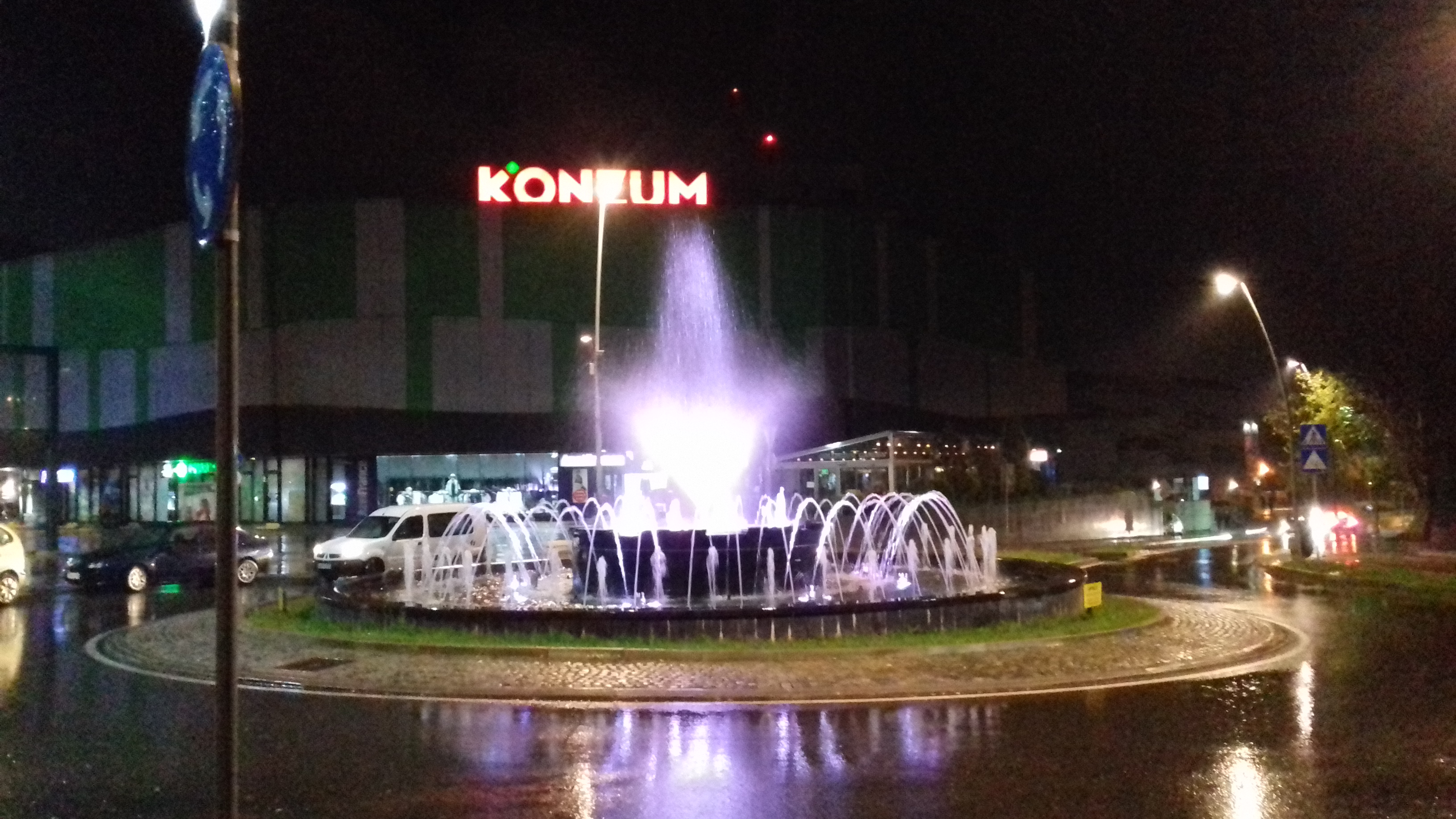
Fountain on Uglovnica

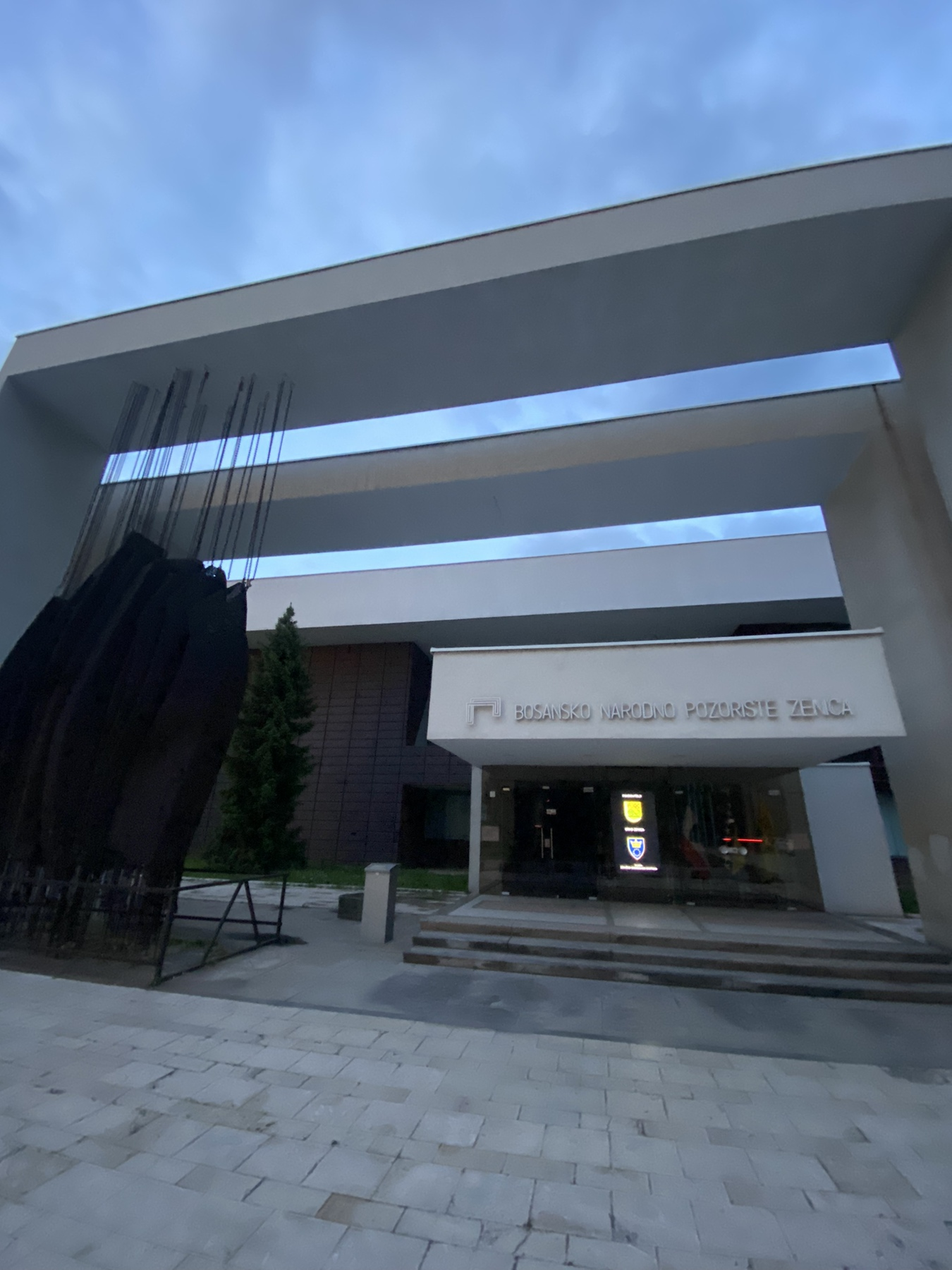
Bosnian National Theatre

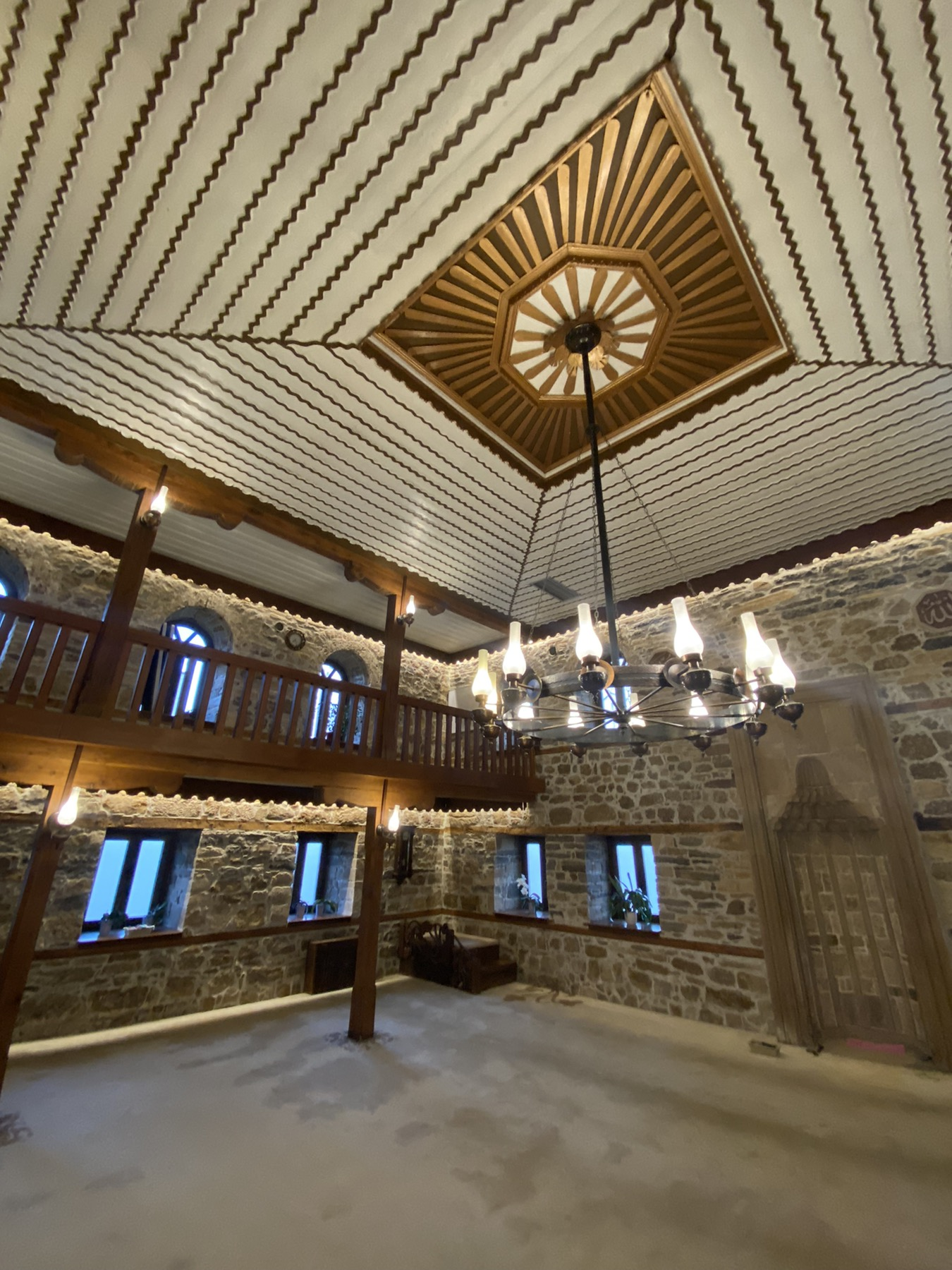
Sultan Ahmed mosque interior

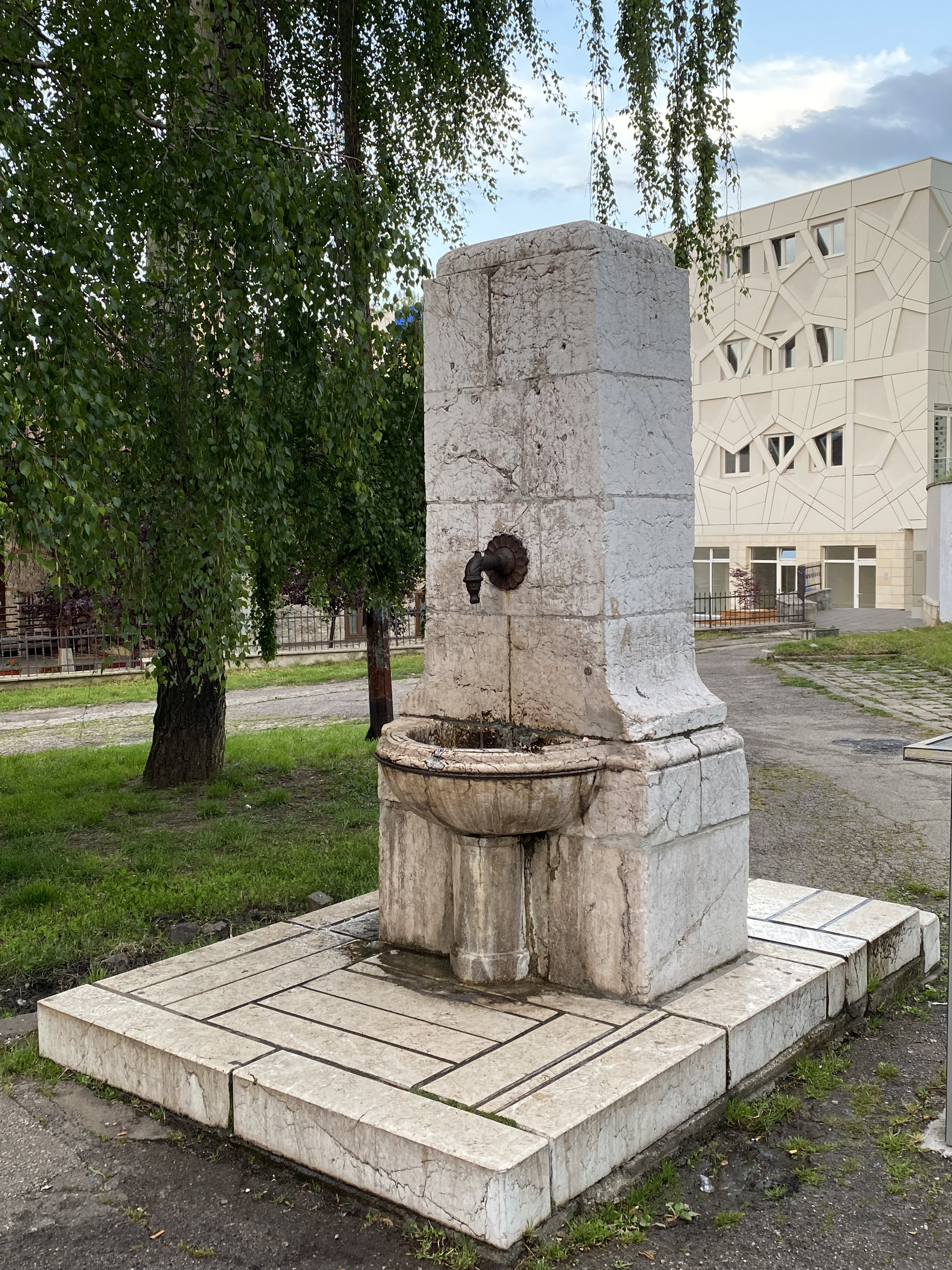
Konjska fountain near Sultan-Ahmed mosque

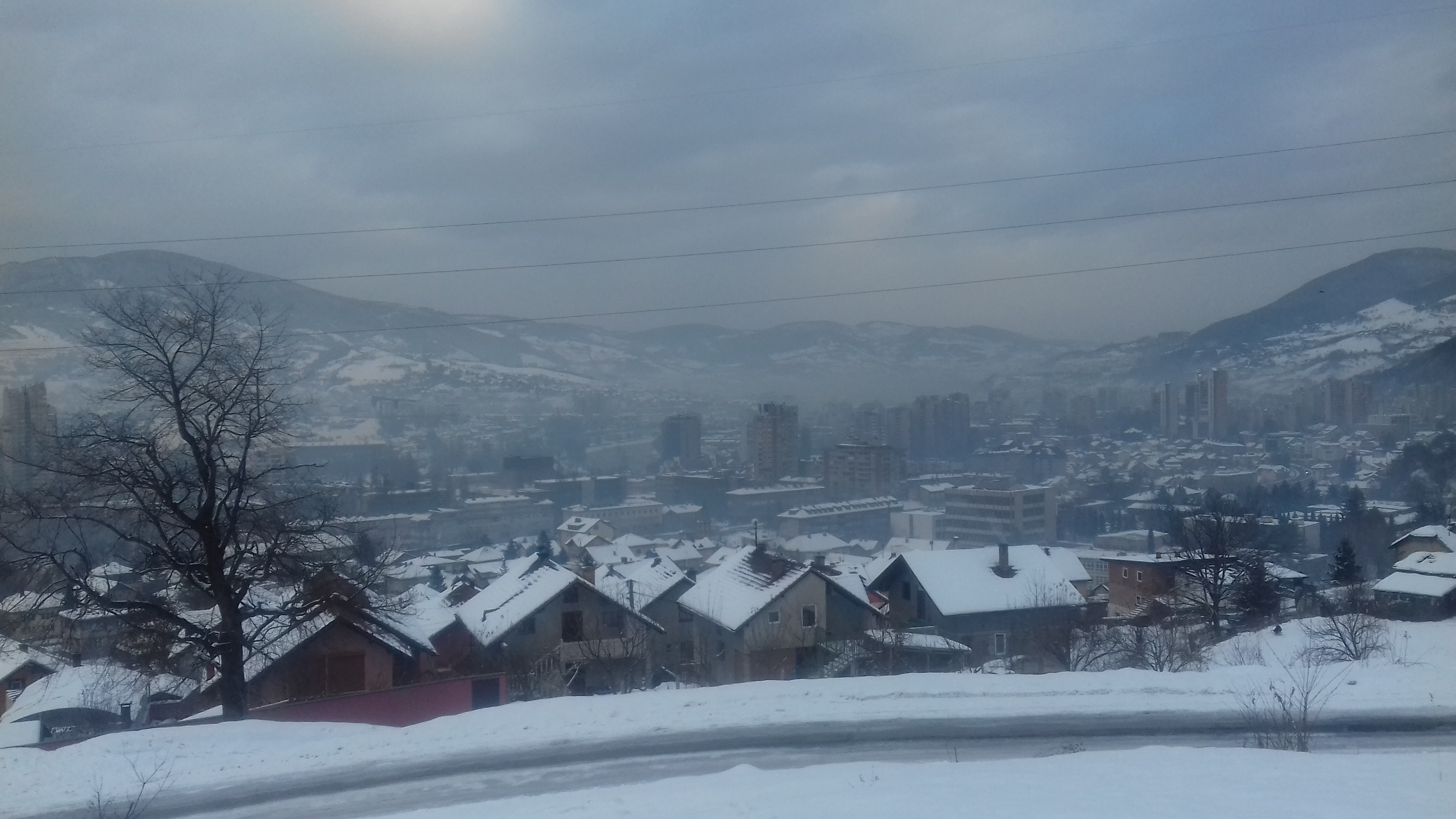
Winter cityscape from Zmajevac

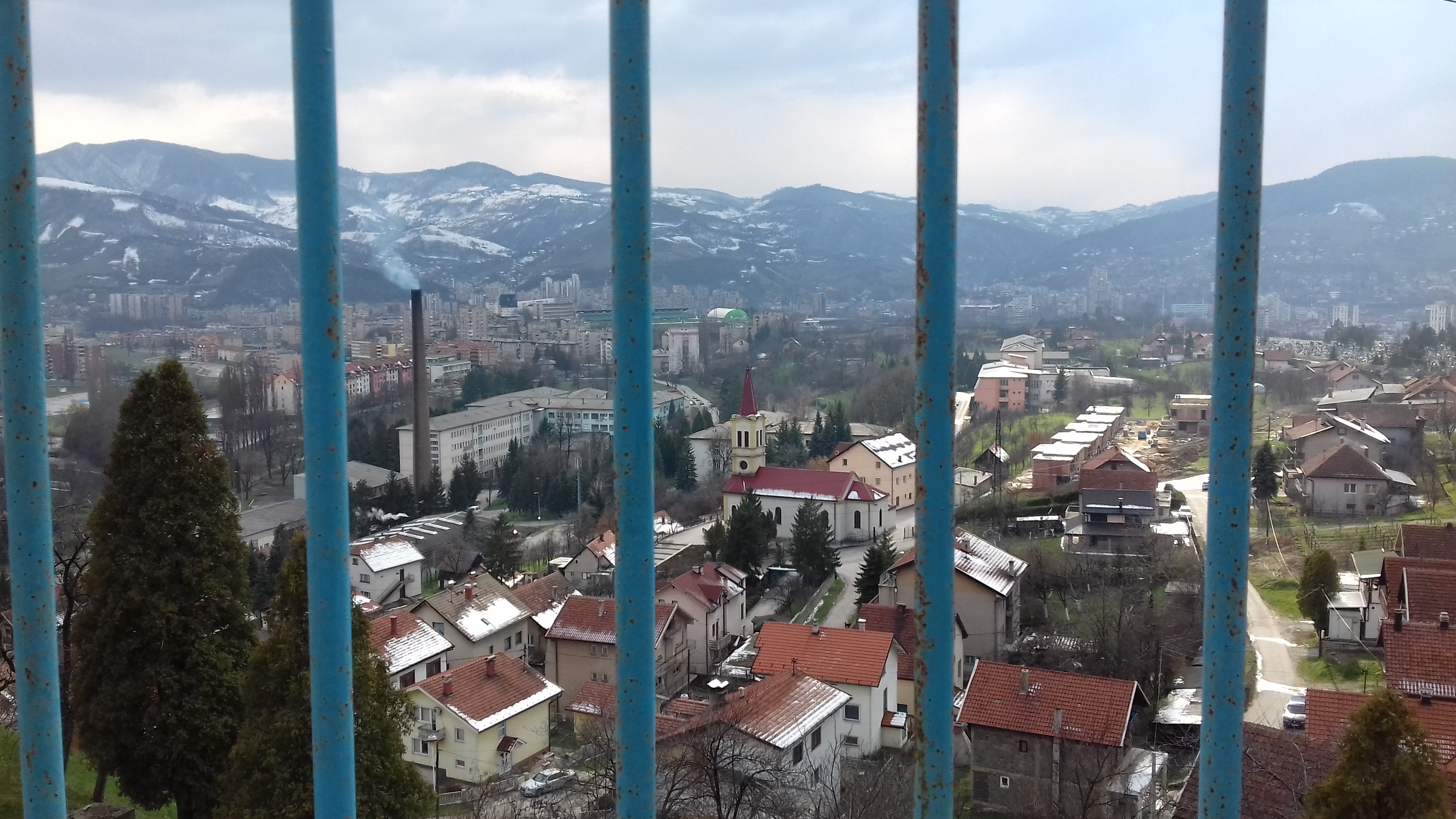
Winter cityscape view from the road to Smetovi, church and hospital in the foreground

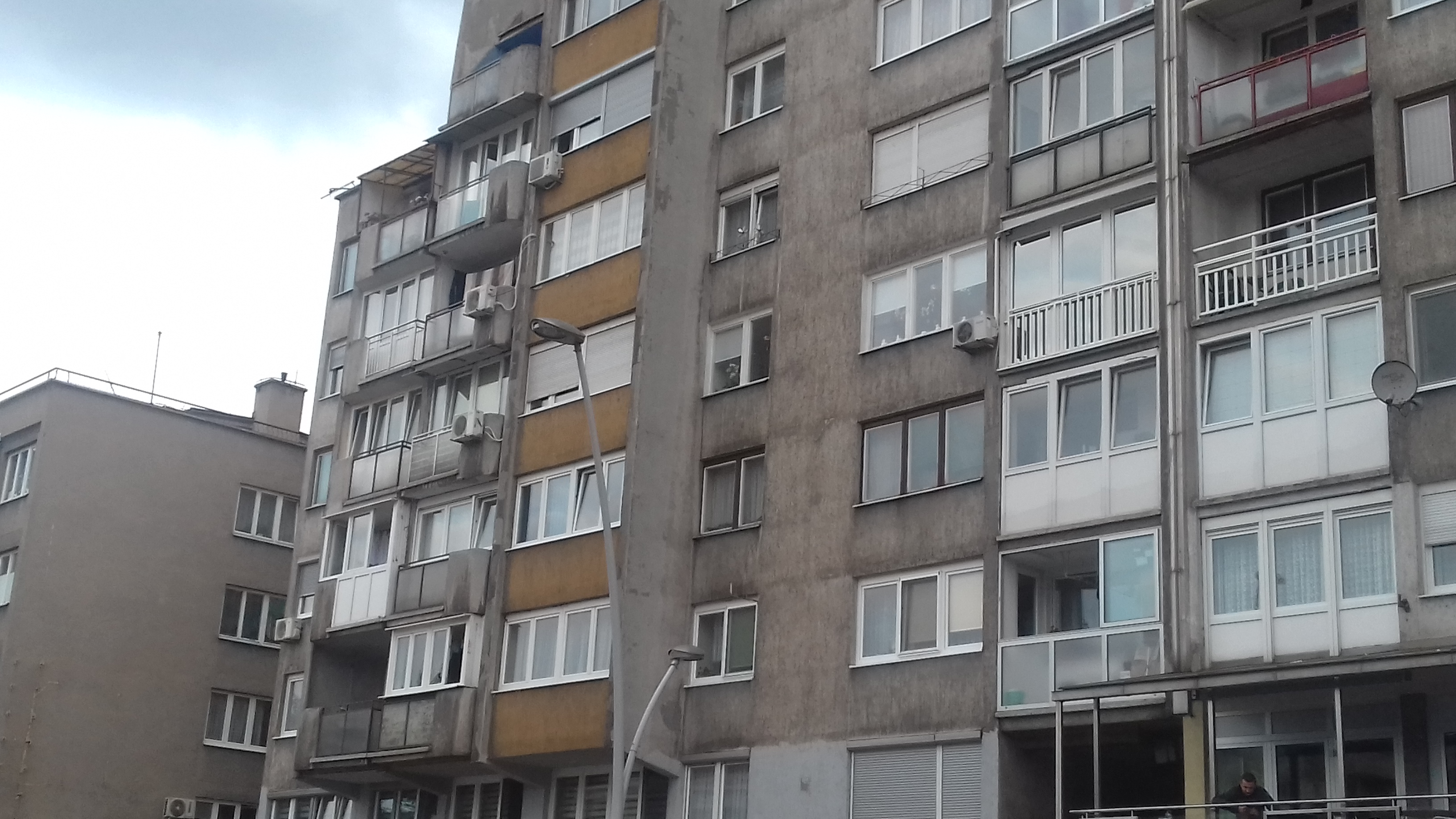
Common architecture, Londža

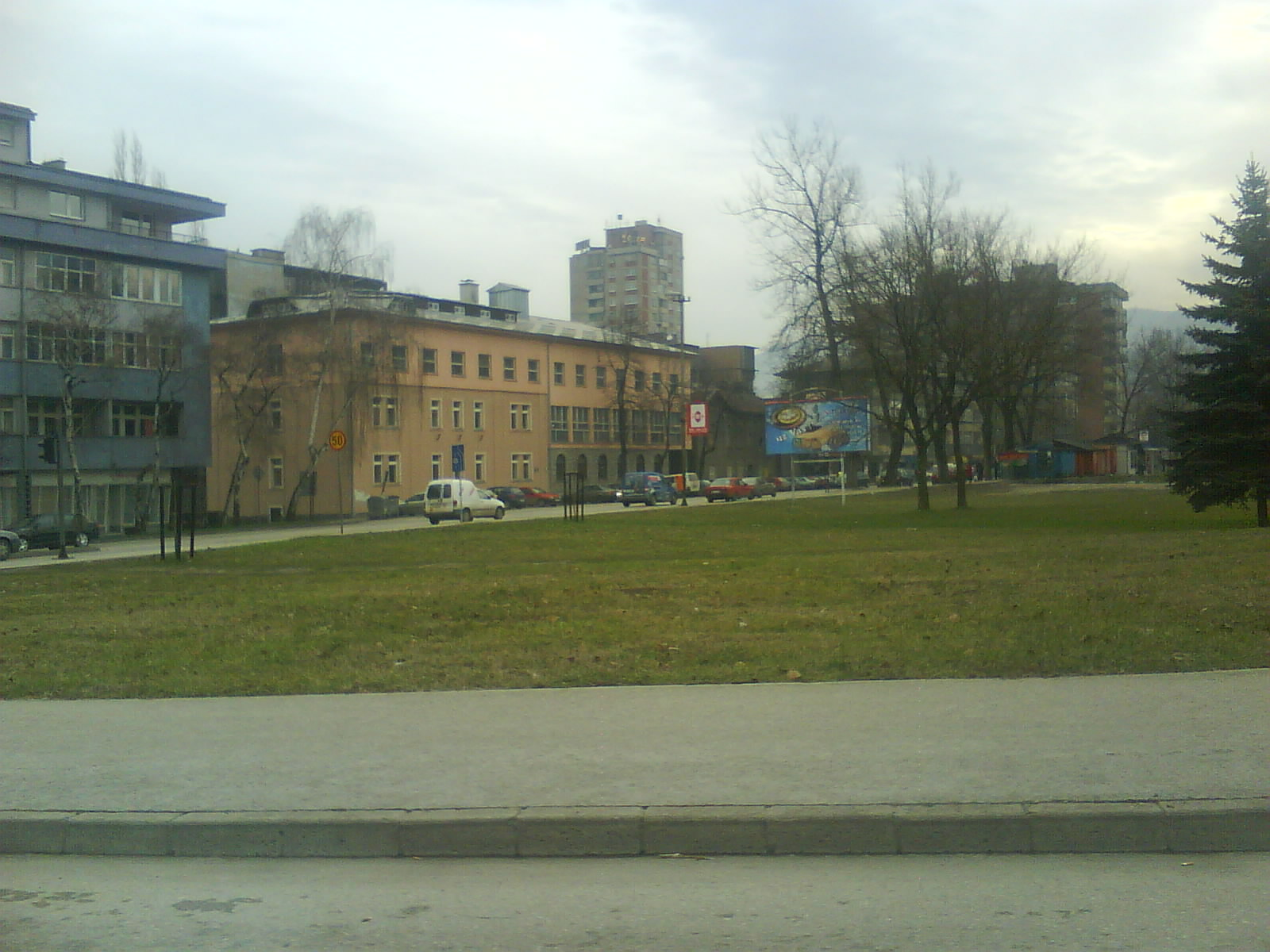
Old municipal building

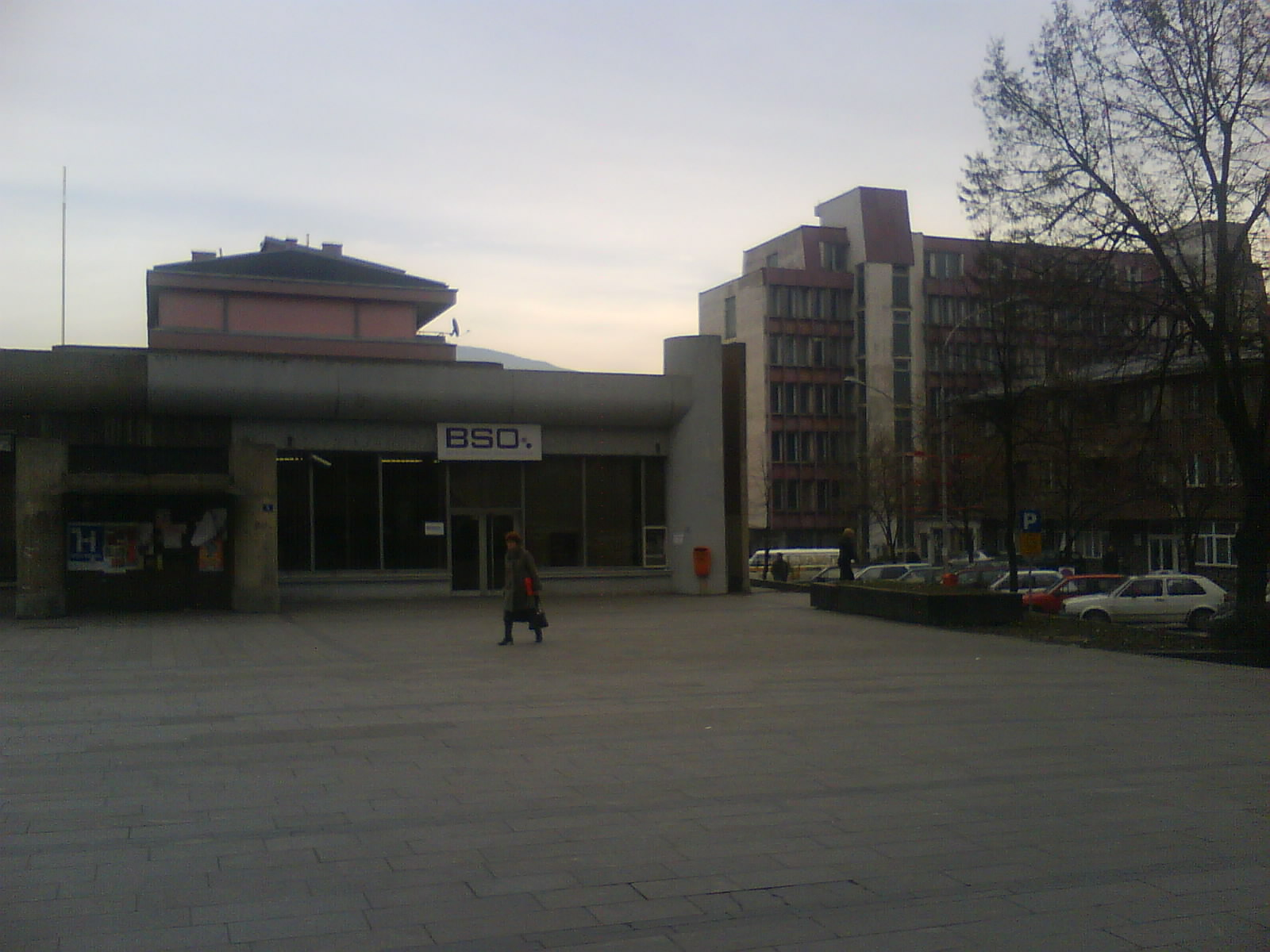
City kafana near theatre

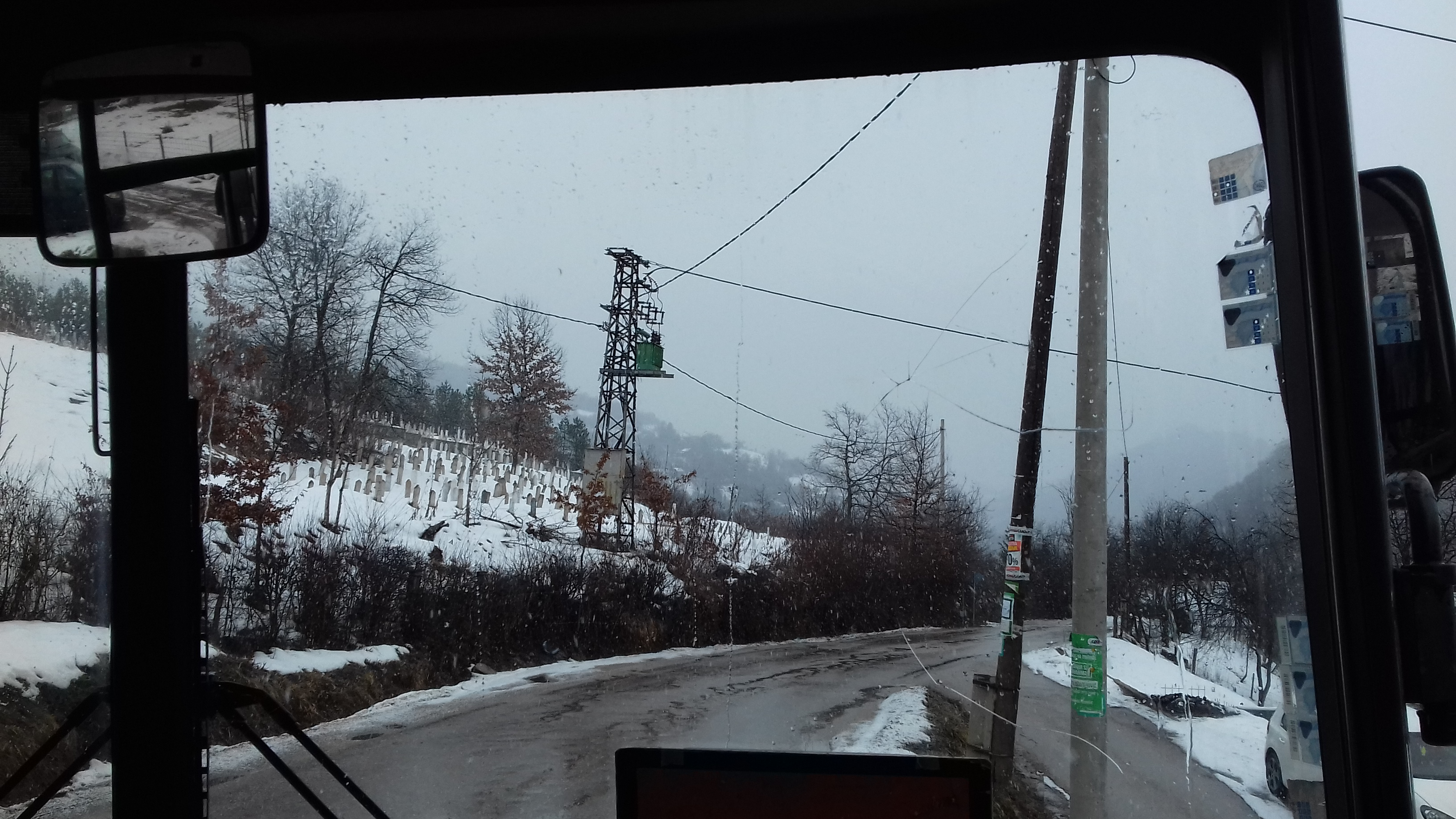
Bus and cemetery

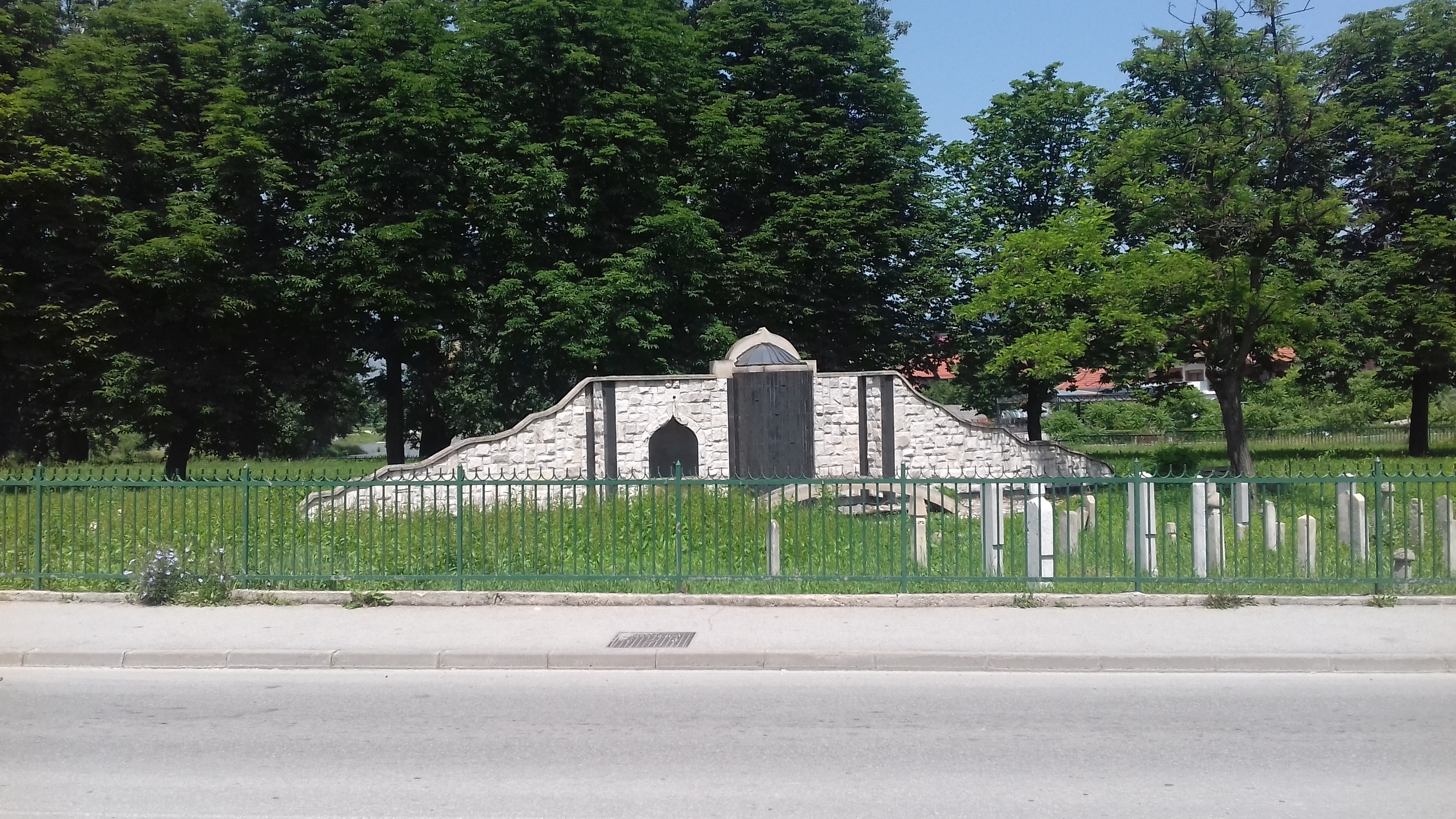
Memorial across city turbe

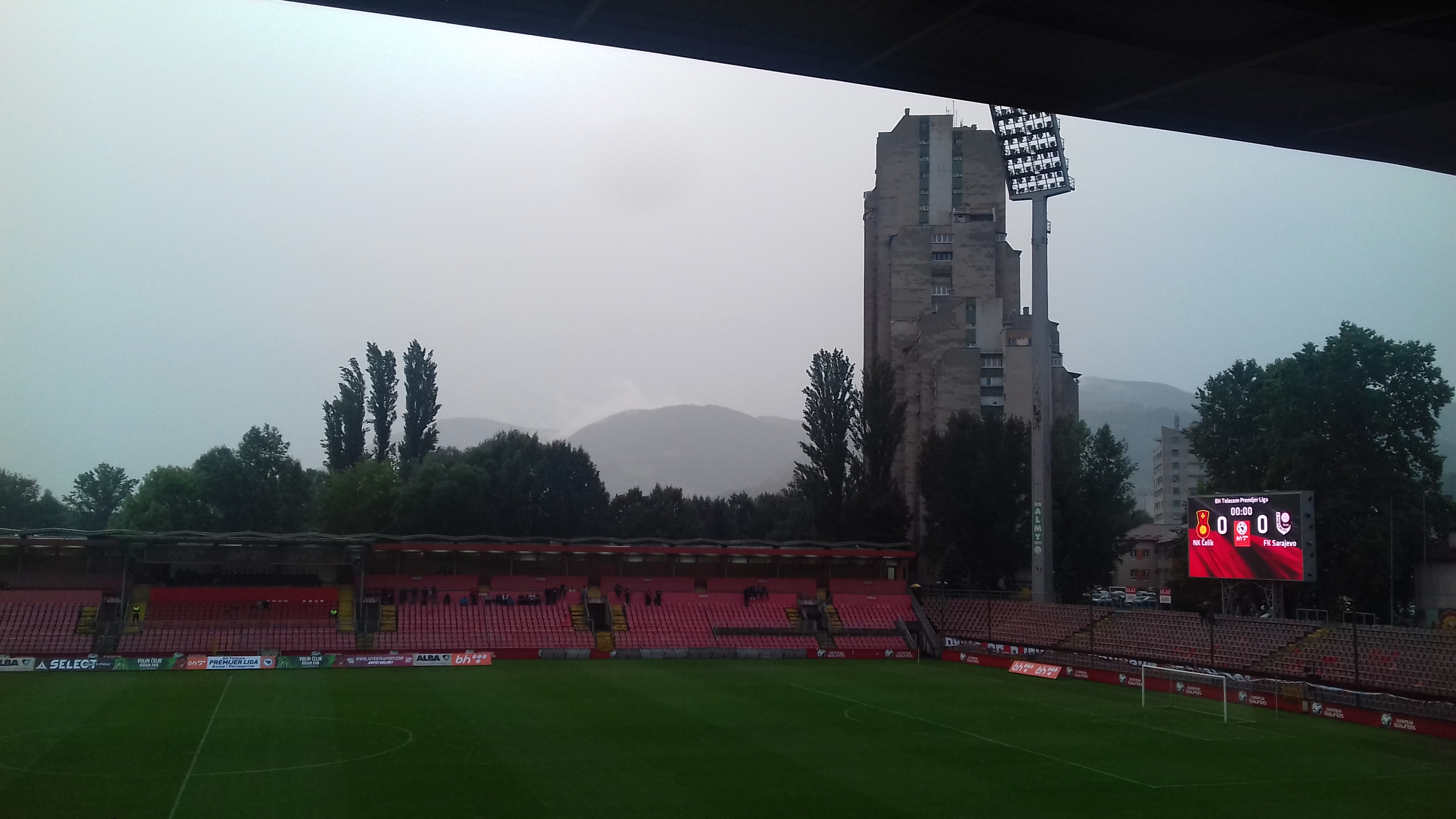
Čelik FC – Sarajevo FC match

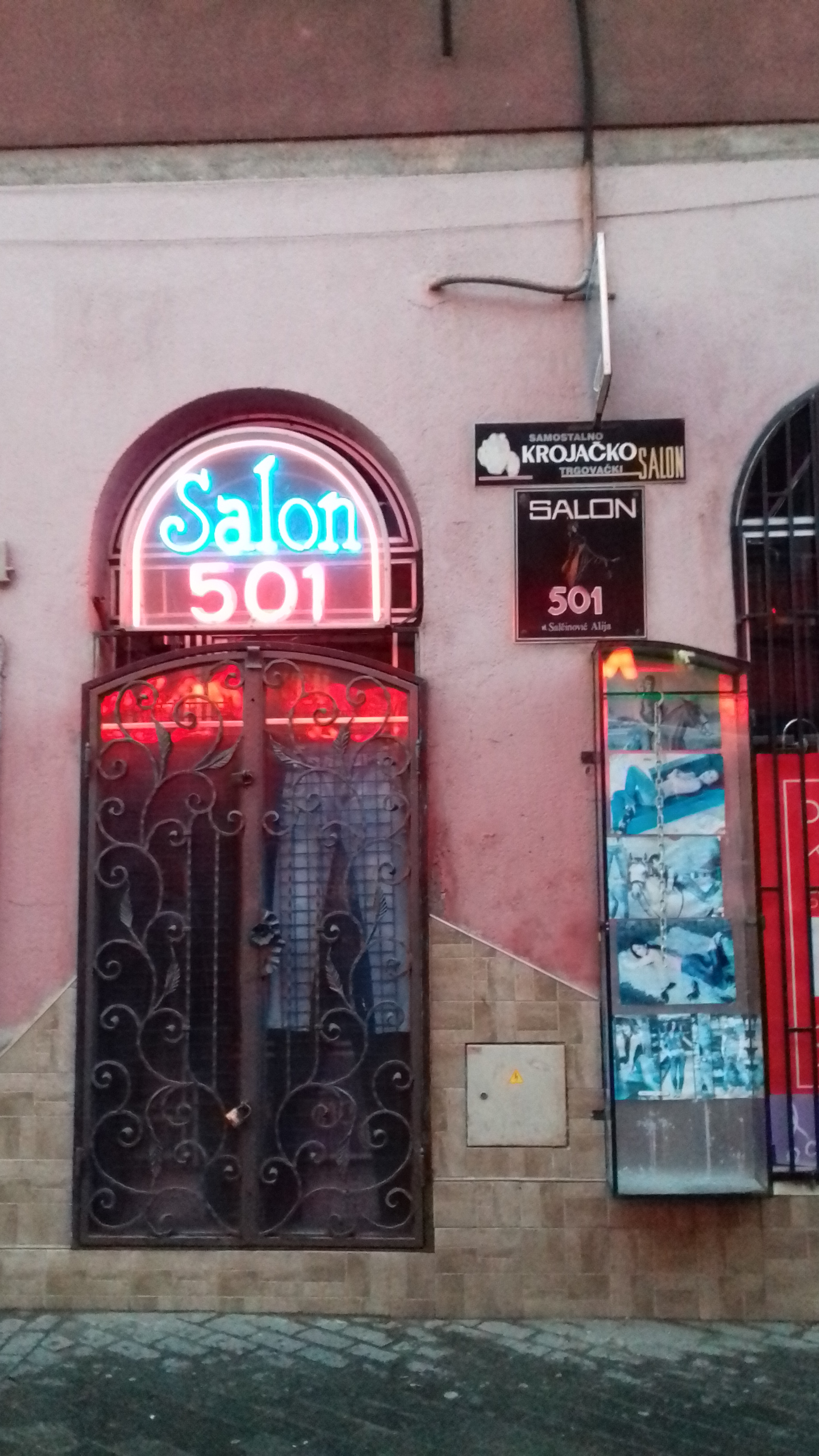
Vintage shop

== Notes ==
1. In former Yugoslavia, Bosniaks were declared as Muslims because their ethnicity was not recognized.
