= Alstermo IF (disambiguation) =

Alstermo IF is a Swedish sports club located in Alstermo, with several sections:

- Alstermo IF Handboll, handball section
- Alstermo IF Fotboll - football section
- Alstermo IF Skidor, skiing section
- Alstermo IF Gymnastik, gymnastics section
- Alstermo IF Orientering, orienteering section
