= 2013 Men's Junior World Handball Championship =

Tournament details
- Host country: Bosnia and Herzegovina
- Venues: 5 (in 4 host cities)
- Dates: 14 – 28 July 2013
- Teams: 24 (from 4 confederations)

Final positions
- Champions: Sweden (3rd title)
- Runners-up: Spain
- Third place: France
- Fourth place: Croatia

Tournament statistics
- Matches played: 100
- Goals scored: 5,423 (54.23 per match)
- Top scorer: (Kuwait) Abdullah Algharaballi (65 goals)

Awards
- Best player: (Sweden) Philip Stenmalm

The 2013 IHF Men's Junior World Championship was the 19th edition of the tournament and was held in Bosnia and Herzegovina from 14 – 28 July 2013.

The Oceania Continent Handball Federation withdrew from the tournament.

== Host cities ==
Bosnia and Herzegovina was awarded hosting rights in May 2011, at the IHF XXXIII Ordinary Congress in Marrakesh, Morocco. After long negotiations with local government, four cities were chosen to host the competition: capital Sarajevo with two halls and Banja Luka, Ljubuški and Zenica with one hall each.

== Qualified teams ==
Africa

- Algeria
- Angola
- Congo
- Egypt
- Tunisia

Americas

- Argentina
- Brazil
- Chile

Asia

- South Korea
- Kuwait
- Qatar

Europe

- Bosnia and Herzegovina (host)
- Croatia
- Denmark
- France
- Germany
- Hungary
- Netherlands
- Russia
- Serbia (replaced team from Oceania)
- Slovenia
- Spain
- Sweden
- Switzerland

Oceania

Oceania gave up their spot, a team from Europe (Serbia) replaced its spot.

== Preliminary round ==
24 teams were drawn into four groups of six teams each. The draw was made in Sarajevo on 19 April 2013. The top four teams from each group advance to the Round of 16. The match schedule was released on May 16.

All times are local (UTC+2).

=== Group A ===
Team	Pld	W	D	L	GF	GA	GD	Pts
Denmark	5	4	1	0	148	113	+35	9
Serbia	5	3	1	1	129	120	+9	7
Tunisia	5	3	0	2	135	138	−3	6
France	5	2	0	3	139	138	+1	4
Russia	5	2	0	3	120	129	−9	4
Angola	5	0	0	5	105	138	−33	0

14 July 2013; 16:00	Tunisia	24 – 34	Denmark	Sportska dvorana Borik, Banja Luka; Referees: Hizaki, Ikebuchi (JPN)
14 July 2013; 16:00	Essais, Jaziri 4	(14–15)	Christensen 9	Sportska dvorana Borik, Banja Luka; Referees: Hizaki, Ikebuchi (JPN)
14 July 2013; 16:00	3× (yellow card) 5× (suspension)	Report	2× (yellow card) 1× (suspension)	Sportska dvorana Borik, Banja Luka; Referees: Hizaki, Ikebuchi (JPN)

14 July 2013; 18:30	Russia	25 – 19	Angola	Sportska dvorana Borik, Banja Luka; Attendance: 300; Referees: Lah, Sok (SLO)
14 July 2013; 18:30	three players 4	(12–8)	Pestana 8	Sportska dvorana Borik, Banja Luka; Attendance: 300; Referees: Lah, Sok (SLO)
14 July 2013; 18:30	3× (yellow card) 2× (suspension)	Report	1× (yellow card) 3× (suspension)	Sportska dvorana Borik, Banja Luka; Attendance: 300; Referees: Lah, Sok (SLO)

14 July 2013; 21:00	France	24 – 25	Serbia	Sportska dvorana Borik, Banja Luka; Attendance: 3,000; Referees: Abdelaziz, El-Moamly (EGY)
14 July 2013; 21:00	Descat 10	(13–13)	Pešić 7	Sportska dvorana Borik, Banja Luka; Attendance: 3,000; Referees: Abdelaziz, El-Moamly (EGY)
14 July 2013; 21:00	4× (yellow card) 4× (suspension)	Report	3× (yellow card) 1× (suspension)	Sportska dvorana Borik, Banja Luka; Attendance: 3,000; Referees: Abdelaziz, El-Moamly (EGY)

15 July 2013; 16:00	Angola	23 – 26	Tunisia	Sportska dvorana Borik, Banja Luka; Attendance: 100; Referees: Brkić, Jusufhodžić (AUT)
15 July 2013; 16:00	three players 5	(12–18)	Majdoub 9	Sportska dvorana Borik, Banja Luka; Attendance: 100; Referees: Brkić, Jusufhodžić (AUT)
15 July 2013; 16:00	2× (yellow card) 4× (suspension)	Report	3× (yellow card) 4× (suspension)	Sportska dvorana Borik, Banja Luka; Attendance: 100; Referees: Brkić, Jusufhodžić (AUT)

15 July 2013; 18:30	Denmark	29 – 26	France	Sportska dvorana Borik, Banja Luka; Attendance: 600; Referees: Lah, Sok (SLO)
15 July 2013; 18:30	Christensen 8	(15–13)	Descat, Boschi 6	Sportska dvorana Borik, Banja Luka; Attendance: 600; Referees: Lah, Sok (SLO)
15 July 2013; 18:30	3× (yellow card) 5× (suspension)	Report	3× (yellow card) 4× (suspension)	Sportska dvorana Borik, Banja Luka; Attendance: 600; Referees: Lah, Sok (SLO)

15 July 2013; 21:00	Serbia	24 – 21	Russia	Sportska dvorana Borik, Banja Luka; Attendance: 3,000; Referees: Hizaki, Ibekuchi (JPN)
15 July 2013; 21:00	Radivojević 7	(10–10)	Shelestyukov 7	Sportska dvorana Borik, Banja Luka; Attendance: 3,000; Referees: Hizaki, Ibekuchi (JPN)
15 July 2013; 21:00	2× (yellow card) 3× (suspension)	Report	1× (yellow card) 5× (suspension) 1× (red card)	Sportska dvorana Borik, Banja Luka; Attendance: 3,000; Referees: Hizaki, Ibekuchi (JPN)

17 July 2013; 16:00	Denmark	31 – 18	Angola	Sportska dvorana Borik, Banja Luka; Attendance: 100; Referees: Abdelaziz, El-Moamly (EGY)
17 July 2013; 16:00	Juul Lassen 10	(16–9)	Sousa 6	Sportska dvorana Borik, Banja Luka; Attendance: 100; Referees: Abdelaziz, El-Moamly (EGY)
17 July 2013; 16:00	2× (yellow card) 2× (suspension)	Report	2× (yellow card) 2× (suspension) 1× (red card)	Sportska dvorana Borik, Banja Luka; Attendance: 100; Referees: Abdelaziz, El-Moamly (EGY)

17 July 2013; 18:30	France	33 – 28	Russia	Sportska dvorana Borik, Banja Luka; Attendance: 1,200; Referees: Brkić, Jusufhodžić (AUT)
17 July 2013; 18:30	Descat 10	(20–16)	Dereven 8	Sportska dvorana Borik, Banja Luka; Attendance: 1,200; Referees: Brkić, Jusufhodžić (AUT)
17 July 2013; 18:30	2× (yellow card) 2× (suspension)	Report	2× (yellow card) 2× (suspension)	Sportska dvorana Borik, Banja Luka; Attendance: 1,200; Referees: Brkić, Jusufhodžić (AUT)

17 July 2013; 21:00	Tunisia	29 – 28	Serbia	Sportska dvorana Borik, Banja Luka; Attendance: 3,000; Referees: Gatelis, Mazeika (LTU)
17 July 2013; 21:00	Mhadhbi 6	(15–14)	Radivojević 6	Sportska dvorana Borik, Banja Luka; Attendance: 3,000; Referees: Gatelis, Mazeika (LTU)
17 July 2013; 21:00	4× (yellow card) 6× (suspension)	Report	4× (yellow card) 5× (suspension)	Sportska dvorana Borik, Banja Luka; Attendance: 3,000; Referees: Gatelis, Mazeika (LTU)

18 July 2013; 16:00	France	28 – 23	Angola	Sportska dvorana Borik, Banja Luka; Attendance: 500; Referees: Hizaki, Ikebuchi (JPN)
18 July 2013; 16:00	Camarero 7	(16–14)	Pestana 9	Sportska dvorana Borik, Banja Luka; Attendance: 500; Referees: Hizaki, Ikebuchi (JPN)
18 July 2013; 16:00	4× (yellow card) 5× (suspension)	Report	3× (yellow card) 5× (suspension)	Sportska dvorana Borik, Banja Luka; Attendance: 500; Referees: Hizaki, Ikebuchi (JPN)

18 July 2013; 18:30	Russia	25 – 23	Tunisia	Sportska dvorana Borik, Banja Luka; Attendance: 1,000; Referees: Abdelaziz, El-Moamly (EGY)
18 July 2013; 18:30	Emelyanenko 7	(9–10)	Souissi 7	Sportska dvorana Borik, Banja Luka; Attendance: 1,000; Referees: Abdelaziz, El-Moamly (EGY)
18 July 2013; 18:30	4× (yellow card) 3× (suspension)	Report	3× (yellow card) 5× (suspension)	Sportska dvorana Borik, Banja Luka; Attendance: 1,000; Referees: Abdelaziz, El-Moamly (EGY)

18 July 2013; 21:00	Serbia	24 – 24	Denmark	Sportska dvorana Borik, Banja Luka; Attendance: 3,000; Referees: Brkić, Jusufhodžić (AUT)
18 July 2013; 21:00	Orbović 8	(13–12)	Langerhuus 5	Sportska dvorana Borik, Banja Luka; Attendance: 3,000; Referees: Brkić, Jusufhodžić (AUT)
18 July 2013; 21:00	3× (yellow card) 5× (suspension)	Report	4× (yellow card) 3× (suspension)	Sportska dvorana Borik, Banja Luka; Attendance: 3,000; Referees: Brkić, Jusufhodžić (AUT)

20 July 2013; 16:00	Tunisia	33 – 28	France	Sportska dvorana Borik, Banja Luka; Attendance: 300; Referees: Brkić, Jusufhodžić (AUT)
20 July 2013; 16:00	Mhadhbi 11	(15–15)	Descat 8	Sportska dvorana Borik, Banja Luka; Attendance: 300; Referees: Brkić, Jusufhodžić (AUT)
20 July 2013; 16:00	4× (yellow card) 5× (suspension)	Report	3× (yellow card) 3× (suspension)	Sportska dvorana Borik, Banja Luka; Attendance: 300; Referees: Brkić, Jusufhodžić (AUT)

20 July 2013; 18:30	Russia	21 – 30	Denmark	Sportska dvorana Borik, Banja Luka; Attendance: 300; Referees: Gatelis, Mazeika (LTU)
20 July 2013; 18:30	Ostashchenko 5	(12–17)	Ellebæk 9	Sportska dvorana Borik, Banja Luka; Attendance: 300; Referees: Gatelis, Mazeika (LTU)
20 July 2013; 18:30	3× (yellow card) 5× (suspension)	Report	3× (yellow card) 4× (suspension)	Sportska dvorana Borik, Banja Luka; Attendance: 300; Referees: Gatelis, Mazeika (LTU)

20 July 2013; 21:00	Angola	22 – 28	Serbia	Sportska dvorana Borik, Banja Luka; Attendance: 3,000; Referees: Abdelaziz, El-Moamly (EGY)
20 July 2013; 21:00	Pestana 7	(12–12)	Orbović 6	Sportska dvorana Borik, Banja Luka; Attendance: 3,000; Referees: Abdelaziz, El-Moamly (EGY)
20 July 2013; 21:00	3× (yellow card) 5× (suspension)	Report	3× (yellow card) 4× (suspension)	Sportska dvorana Borik, Banja Luka; Attendance: 3,000; Referees: Abdelaziz, El-Moamly (EGY)

=== Group B ===
Team	Pld	W	D	L	GF	GA	GD	Pts
Germany	5	5	0	0	143	117	+26	10
Croatia	5	4	0	1	128	105	+23	8
Netherlands	5	2	0	3	130	127	+3	4
Switzerland	5	2	0	3	129	131	−2	4
Qatar	5	2	0	3	119	124	−5	4
Algeria	5	0	0	5	113	158	−45	0

14 July 2013; 16:00	Switzerland	25 – 22	Netherlands	Gradska sportska dvorana Ljubuški, Ljubuški; Attendance: 200; Referees: Gatelis, Mazeika (LTU)
14 July 2013; 16:00	Jud 8	(12–11)	Polman 9	Gradska sportska dvorana Ljubuški, Ljubuški; Attendance: 200; Referees: Gatelis, Mazeika (LTU)
14 July 2013; 16:00	3× (yellow card) 3× (suspension)	Report	4× (yellow card) 6× (suspension) 1× (red card)	Gradska sportska dvorana Ljubuški, Ljubuški; Attendance: 200; Referees: Gatelis, Mazeika (LTU)

14 July 2013; 18:30	Germany	35 – 21	Algeria	Gradska sportska dvorana Ljubuški, Ljubuški; Attendance: 400; Referees: Al-Mutawa, Al-Suwailem (KUW)
14 July 2013; 18:30	Durak 6	(15–8)	four players 3	Gradska sportska dvorana Ljubuški, Ljubuški; Attendance: 400; Referees: Al-Mutawa, Al-Suwailem (KUW)
14 July 2013; 18:30	1× (yellow card) 4× (suspension)	Report	2× (yellow card) 6× (suspension)	Gradska sportska dvorana Ljubuški, Ljubuški; Attendance: 400; Referees: Al-Mutawa, Al-Suwailem (KUW)

14 July 2013; 21:00	Croatia	21 – 19	Qatar	Gradska sportska dvorana Ljubuški, Ljubuški; Attendance: 3,000; Referees: González, Prieto (URU)
14 July 2013; 21:00	Ivić 7	(9–13)	Omahić, Ayed 5	Gradska sportska dvorana Ljubuški, Ljubuški; Attendance: 3,000; Referees: González, Prieto (URU)
14 July 2013; 21:00	3× (yellow card) 1× (suspension)	Report	4× (yellow card) 5× (suspension) 1× (red card)	Gradska sportska dvorana Ljubuški, Ljubuški; Attendance: 3,000; Referees: González, Prieto (URU)

15 July 2013; 16:00	Algeria	24 – 33	Switzerland	Gradska sportska dvorana Ljubuški, Ljubuški; Attendance: 300; Referees: González, Prieto (URU)
15 July 2013; 16:00	Hammouche 6	(13–16)	Maros 8	Gradska sportska dvorana Ljubuški, Ljubuški; Attendance: 300; Referees: González, Prieto (URU)
15 July 2013; 16:00	2× (yellow card) 8× (suspension) 1× (red card)	Report	3× (yellow card) 8× (suspension)	Gradska sportska dvorana Ljubuški, Ljubuški; Attendance: 300; Referees: González, Prieto (URU)

15 July 2013; 18:30	Qatar	22 – 27	Germany	Gradska sportska dvorana Ljubuški, Ljubuški; Attendance: 1,700; Referees: Gatelis, Mazeika (LTU)
15 July 2013; 18:30	Hamdoon 4	(12–10)	three players 4	Gradska sportska dvorana Ljubuški, Ljubuški; Attendance: 1,700; Referees: Gatelis, Mazeika (LTU)
15 July 2013; 18:30	3× (yellow card) 7× (suspension)	Report	1× (yellow card) 3× (suspension)	Gradska sportska dvorana Ljubuški, Ljubuški; Attendance: 1,700; Referees: Gatelis, Mazeika (LTU)

15 July 2013; 21:00	Netherlands	23 – 29	Croatia	Gradska sportska dvorana Ljubuški, Ljubuški; Attendance: 2,500; Referees: Konjičanin, Konjičanin (BIH)
15 July 2013; 21:00	Krijntjes, Falke 4	(7–14)	Tokić, Kaleb 6	Gradska sportska dvorana Ljubuški, Ljubuški; Attendance: 2,500; Referees: Konjičanin, Konjičanin (BIH)
15 July 2013; 21:00	4× (yellow card) 7× (suspension)	Report	3× (yellow card) 3× (suspension) 1× (red card)	Gradska sportska dvorana Ljubuški, Ljubuški; Attendance: 2,500; Referees: Konjičanin, Konjičanin (BIH)

17 July 2013; 16:00	Qatar	19 – 26	Netherlands	Gradska sportska dvorana Ljubuški, Ljubuški; Attendance: 780; Referees: Al-Mutawa, Al-Suwailem (KUW)
17 July 2013; 16:00	four players 3	(11–13)	van den Beucken 10	Gradska sportska dvorana Ljubuški, Ljubuški; Attendance: 780; Referees: Al-Mutawa, Al-Suwailem (KUW)
17 July 2013; 16:00	3× (yellow card) 7× (suspension)	Report	4× (yellow card) 6× (suspension)	Gradska sportska dvorana Ljubuški, Ljubuški; Attendance: 780; Referees: Al-Mutawa, Al-Suwailem (KUW)

17 July 2013; 18:30	Germany	29 – 24	Switzerland	Gradska sportska dvorana Ljubuški, Ljubuški; Attendance: 1,500; Referees: Konjičanin, Konjičanin (BIH)
17 July 2013; 18:30	Kuhn 8	(15–13)	Jud 4	Gradska sportska dvorana Ljubuški, Ljubuški; Attendance: 1,500; Referees: Konjičanin, Konjičanin (BIH)
17 July 2013; 18:30	2× (yellow card) 4× (suspension)	Report	3× (yellow card) 5× (suspension)	Gradska sportska dvorana Ljubuški, Ljubuški; Attendance: 1,500; Referees: Konjičanin, Konjičanin (BIH)

17 July 2013; 21:00	Croatia	30 – 21	Algeria	Gradska sportska dvorana Ljubuški, Ljubuški; Attendance: 3,000; Referees: Lah, Sok (SLO)
17 July 2013; 21:00	Ivić, Kaleb 7	(17–10)	Daoud, Hammouche 4	Gradska sportska dvorana Ljubuški, Ljubuški; Attendance: 3,000; Referees: Lah, Sok (SLO)
17 July 2013; 21:00	3× (yellow card) 1× (suspension)	Report	3× (yellow card) 2× (suspension)	Gradska sportska dvorana Ljubuški, Ljubuški; Attendance: 3,000; Referees: Lah, Sok (SLO)

18 July 2013; 16:00	Germany	30 – 29	Netherlands	Gradska sportska dvorana Ljubuški, Ljubuški; Attendance: 300; Referees: González, Prieto (URU)
18 July 2013; 16:00	Niemeyer 6	(15–14)	Baart 6	Gradska sportska dvorana Ljubuški, Ljubuški; Attendance: 300; Referees: González, Prieto (URU)
18 July 2013; 16:00	3× (yellow card) 4× (suspension)	Report	3× (yellow card) 7× (suspension)	Gradska sportska dvorana Ljubuški, Ljubuški; Attendance: 300; Referees: González, Prieto (URU)

18 July 2013; 18:30	Algeria	23 – 30	Qatar	Gradska sportska dvorana Ljubuški, Ljubuški; Attendance: 400; Referees: Konjičanin, Konjičanin (BIH)
18 July 2013; 18:30	Khantache 7	(14–13)	Al-Shammari 7	Gradska sportska dvorana Ljubuški, Ljubuški; Attendance: 400; Referees: Konjičanin, Konjičanin (BIH)
18 July 2013; 18:30	4× (yellow card) 7× (suspension)	Report	3× (yellow card) 6× (suspension)	Gradska sportska dvorana Ljubuški, Ljubuški; Attendance: 400; Referees: Konjičanin, Konjičanin (BIH)

18 July 2013; 21:00	Switzerland	20 – 27	Croatia	Gradska sportska dvorana Ljubuški, Ljubuški; Attendance: 2,500; Referees: Al-Mutawa, Al-Suwailem (KUW)
18 July 2013; 21:00	Maros 5	(9–13)	Kaleb 7	Gradska sportska dvorana Ljubuški, Ljubuški; Attendance: 2,500; Referees: Al-Mutawa, Al-Suwailem (KUW)
18 July 2013; 21:00	3× (yellow card) 5× (suspension) 1× (red card)	Report	2× (yellow card) 6× (suspension)	Gradska sportska dvorana Ljubuški, Ljubuški; Attendance: 2,500; Referees: Al-Mutawa, Al-Suwailem (KUW)

20 July 2013; 16:00	Netherlands	30 – 24	Algeria	Gradska sportska dvorana Ljubuški, Ljubuški; Attendance: 400; Referees: Al-Mutawa, Al-Suwailem (KUW)
20 July 2013; 16:00	Steins, Smits 5	(17–8)	Kimouche 9	Gradska sportska dvorana Ljubuški, Ljubuški; Attendance: 400; Referees: Al-Mutawa, Al-Suwailem (KUW)
20 July 2013; 16:00	3× (yellow card) 7× (suspension)	Report	3× (yellow card) 5× (suspension)	Gradska sportska dvorana Ljubuški, Ljubuški; Attendance: 400; Referees: Al-Mutawa, Al-Suwailem (KUW)

20 July 2013; 18:30	Switzerland	27 – 29	Qatar	Gradska sportska dvorana Ljubuški, Ljubuški; Attendance: 1,500; Referees: González, Prieto (URU)
20 July 2013; 18:30	Jud 7	(12–12)	Hamdoon 7	Gradska sportska dvorana Ljubuški, Ljubuški; Attendance: 1,500; Referees: González, Prieto (URU)
20 July 2013; 18:30	2× (yellow card) 4× (suspension)	Report	4× (yellow card) 4× (suspension) 1× (red card)	Gradska sportska dvorana Ljubuški, Ljubuški; Attendance: 1,500; Referees: González, Prieto (URU)

20 July 2013; 21:00	Croatia	21 – 22	Germany	Gradska sportska dvorana Ljubuški, Ljubuški; Attendance: 4,000; Referees: Lah, Sok (SLO)
20 July 2013; 21:00	Ćorić 4	(8–9)	Musche 5	Gradska sportska dvorana Ljubuški, Ljubuški; Attendance: 4,000; Referees: Lah, Sok (SLO)
20 July 2013; 21:00	3× (yellow card) 2× (suspension)	Report	2× (yellow card) 3× (suspension)	Gradska sportska dvorana Ljubuški, Ljubuški; Attendance: 4,000; Referees: Lah, Sok (SLO)

=== Group C ===
Team	Pld	W	D	L	GF	GA	GD	Pts
Slovenia	5	5	0	0	168	115	+53	10
Bosnia and Herzegovina	5	3	1	1	136	121	+15	7
Hungary	5	3	0	2	151	129	+22	6
Argentina	5	2	0	3	128	143	−15	4
South Korea	5	1	1	3	132	147	−15	3
Congo	5	0	0	5	112	172	−60	0

14 July 2013; 16:00	Congo	25 – 35	Argentina	Olympic Hall, Sarajevo; Attendance: 100; Referees: Özdeniz, Erdoğan (TUR)
14 July 2013; 16:00	Mobombo Mopiti 7	(13–16)	Simonet 12	Olympic Hall, Sarajevo; Attendance: 100; Referees: Özdeniz, Erdoğan (TUR)
14 July 2013; 16:00	3× (yellow card) 8× (suspension)	Report	3× (yellow card) 2× (suspension) 1× (red card)	Olympic Hall, Sarajevo; Attendance: 100; Referees: Özdeniz, Erdoğan (TUR)

14 July 2013; 18:30	Slovenia	33 – 32	Hungary	Olympic Hall, Sarajevo; Attendance: 200; Referees: Birch, Stenrand (DEN)
14 July 2013; 18:30	Šoštarič 10	(14–19)	Zdolik, Szöllösi 6	Olympic Hall, Sarajevo; Attendance: 200; Referees: Birch, Stenrand (DEN)
14 July 2013; 18:30	3× (yellow card) 6× (suspension)	Report	3× (yellow card) 6× (suspension)	Olympic Hall, Sarajevo; Attendance: 200; Referees: Birch, Stenrand (DEN)

14 July 2013; 21:00	Bosnia and Herzegovina	26 – 26	South Korea	Olympic Hall, Sarajevo; Attendance: 1,500; Referees: Boualloucha, Khenissi (TUN)
14 July 2013; 21:00	Perić 6	(15–15)	Jeong Kwan-Jung, Ha Min-Ho 7	Olympic Hall, Sarajevo; Attendance: 1,500; Referees: Boualloucha, Khenissi (TUN)
14 July 2013; 21:00	4× (yellow card) 6× (suspension)	Report	4× (yellow card) 5× (suspension)	Olympic Hall, Sarajevo; Attendance: 1,500; Referees: Boualloucha, Khenissi (TUN)

15 July 2013; 16:00	Argentina	17 – 31	Slovenia	Olympic Hall, Sarajevo; Attendance: 200; Referees: Allade, Dagba (BEN)
15 July 2013; 16:00	Szpigiel 6	(5–16)	Spende 7	Olympic Hall, Sarajevo; Attendance: 200; Referees: Allade, Dagba (BEN)
15 July 2013; 16:00	2× (yellow card) 3× (suspension) 1× (red card)	Report	1× (yellow card) 7× (suspension)	Olympic Hall, Sarajevo; Attendance: 200; Referees: Allade, Dagba (BEN)

15 July 2013; 18:30	South Korea	27 – 24	Congo	Olympic Hall, Sarajevo; Attendance: 100; Referees: Birch, Stenrand (DEN)
15 July 2013; 18:30	Oh Seung-Gwon, Hwang Do-Yeop 6	(15–12)	Angao 10	Olympic Hall, Sarajevo; Attendance: 100; Referees: Birch, Stenrand (DEN)
15 July 2013; 18:30	3× (yellow card) 3× (suspension)	Report	3× (yellow card) 7× (suspension)	Olympic Hall, Sarajevo; Attendance: 100; Referees: Birch, Stenrand (DEN)

15 July 2013; 21:00	Hungary	21 – 25	Bosnia and Herzegovina	Olympic Hall, Sarajevo; Attendance: 3,000; Referees: Erdoğan, Özdeniz (TUR)
15 July 2013; 21:00	Szöllösi 6	(16–11)	three players 4	Olympic Hall, Sarajevo; Attendance: 3,000; Referees: Erdoğan, Özdeniz (TUR)
15 July 2013; 21:00	3× (yellow card) 6× (suspension)	Report	3× (yellow card) 8× (suspension)	Olympic Hall, Sarajevo; Attendance: 3,000; Referees: Erdoğan, Özdeniz (TUR)

17 July 2013; 16:00	Congo	19 – 37	Hungary	Olympic Hall, Sarajevo; Attendance: 100; Referees: Li, Wang (CHN)
17 July 2013; 16:00	Angao 11	(11–19)	Zdolik 8	Olympic Hall, Sarajevo; Attendance: 100; Referees: Li, Wang (CHN)
17 July 2013; 16:00	4× (yellow card) 4× (suspension)	Report	3× (yellow card) 7× (suspension)	Olympic Hall, Sarajevo; Attendance: 100; Referees: Li, Wang (CHN)

17 July 2013; 18:30	Argentina	30 – 29	South Korea	Olympic Hall, Sarajevo; Attendance: 300; Referees: Volodkov, Zotin (RUS)
17 July 2013; 18:30	Simonet 14	(16–14)	Lee Hyeon-Sik 8	Olympic Hall, Sarajevo; Attendance: 300; Referees: Volodkov, Zotin (RUS)
17 July 2013; 18:30	3× (yellow card) 6× (suspension)	Report	4× (yellow card) 1× (suspension)	Olympic Hall, Sarajevo; Attendance: 300; Referees: Volodkov, Zotin (RUS)

17 July 2013; 21:00	Slovenia	28 – 24	Bosnia and Herzegovina	Olympic Hall, Sarajevo; Attendance: 7,000; Referees: Pichon, Reveret (FRA)
17 July 2013; 21:00	Šoštarič 9	(13–13)	Malinović 6	Olympic Hall, Sarajevo; Attendance: 7,000; Referees: Pichon, Reveret (FRA)
17 July 2013; 21:00	3× (yellow card) 5× (suspension)	Report	3× (yellow card) 3× (suspension)	Olympic Hall, Sarajevo; Attendance: 7,000; Referees: Pichon, Reveret (FRA)

18 July 2013; 16:00	Hungary	28 – 21	Argentina	Olympic Hall, Sarajevo; Attendance: 100; Referees: Pavićević, Ražnatović (MNE)
18 July 2013; 16:00	Zdolik 7	(14–12)	Simonet 8	Olympic Hall, Sarajevo; Attendance: 100; Referees: Pavićević, Ražnatović (MNE)
18 July 2013; 16:00	3× (yellow card) 7× (suspension)	Report	3× (yellow card) 4× (suspension)	Olympic Hall, Sarajevo; Attendance: 100; Referees: Pavićević, Ražnatović (MNE)

18 July 2013; 18:30	Slovenia	34 – 19	South Korea	Olympic Hall, Sarajevo; Attendance: 200; Referees: Boualloucha, Khenissi (TUN)
18 July 2013; 18:30	Cehte 6	(18–9)	Lee Hyeon-Sik 8	Olympic Hall, Sarajevo; Attendance: 200; Referees: Boualloucha, Khenissi (TUN)
18 July 2013; 18:30	3× (yellow card) 3× (suspension)	Report	3× (yellow card) 3× (suspension)	Olympic Hall, Sarajevo; Attendance: 200; Referees: Boualloucha, Khenissi (TUN)

18 July 2013; 21:00	Bosnia and Herzegovina	31 – 21	Congo	Olympic Hall, Sarajevo; Attendance: 1,500; Referees: Allade, Dagba (BEN)
18 July 2013; 21:00	Građan, Zulfić 6	(15–9)	Angao 9	Olympic Hall, Sarajevo; Attendance: 1,500; Referees: Allade, Dagba (BEN)
18 July 2013; 21:00	3× (yellow card) 6× (suspension)	Report	3× (yellow card) 1× (suspension)	Olympic Hall, Sarajevo; Attendance: 1,500; Referees: Allade, Dagba (BEN)

20 July 2013; 16:00	South Korea	31 – 33	Hungary	Olympic Hall, Sarajevo; Attendance: 200; Referees: Volodkov, Zotin (RUS)
20 July 2013; 16:00	Kim Jun-Hyeong 9	(13–13)	Zdolik, Debreczeni 9	Olympic Hall, Sarajevo; Attendance: 200; Referees: Volodkov, Zotin (RUS)
20 July 2013; 16:00	3× (yellow card) 7× (suspension)	Report	3× (yellow card) 4× (suspension) 1× (red card)	Olympic Hall, Sarajevo; Attendance: 200; Referees: Volodkov, Zotin (RUS)

20 July 2013; 18:30	Congo	23 – 42	Slovenia	Olympic Hall, Sarajevo; Attendance: 300; Referees: Erdoğan, Özdeniz (TUR)
20 July 2013; 18:30	Angao 8	(11–21)	Spende 8	Olympic Hall, Sarajevo; Attendance: 300; Referees: Erdoğan, Özdeniz (TUR)
20 July 2013; 18:30	3× (yellow card) 5× (suspension)	Report	3× (yellow card) 4× (suspension)	Olympic Hall, Sarajevo; Attendance: 300; Referees: Erdoğan, Özdeniz (TUR)

20 July 2013; 21:00	Bosnia and Herzegovina	30 – 25	Argentina	Olympic Hall, Sarajevo; Attendance: 4,000; Referees: Li, Wang (CHN)
20 July 2013; 21:00	Građan 7	(15–13)	Baronetto 7	Olympic Hall, Sarajevo; Attendance: 4,000; Referees: Li, Wang (CHN)
20 July 2013; 21:00	3× (yellow card) 3× (suspension)	Report	3× (yellow card) 3× (suspension)	Olympic Hall, Sarajevo; Attendance: 4,000; Referees: Li, Wang (CHN)

=== Group D ===
Team	Pld	W	D	L	GF	GA	GD	Pts
Sweden	5	5	0	0	172	111	+61	10
Spain	5	3	1	1	158	134	+24	7
Egypt	5	3	1	1	136	128	+8	7
Brazil	5	2	0	3	123	129	−6	4
Kuwait	5	1	0	4	130	154	−24	2
Chile	5	0	0	5	104	167	−63	0

14 July 2013; 16:00	Spain	28 – 28	Egypt	Arena Zenica, Zenica; Attendance: 500; Referees: Reveret, Pichon (FRA)
14 July 2013; 16:00	Sáez Lozano 8	(13–16)	Osama Mohamed, Adel Anwar Aly 5	Arena Zenica, Zenica; Attendance: 500; Referees: Reveret, Pichon (FRA)
14 July 2013; 16:00	3× (yellow card) 5× (suspension)	Report	3× (yellow card) 6× (suspension)	Arena Zenica, Zenica; Attendance: 500; Referees: Reveret, Pichon (FRA)

14 July 2013; 18:30	Sweden	30 – 20	Kuwait	Arena Zenica, Zenica; Attendance: 500; Referees: Pavićević, Ražnatović (MNE)
14 July 2013; 18:30	Berg 7	(11–13)	Al-Gharaballi 8	Arena Zenica, Zenica; Attendance: 500; Referees: Pavićević, Ražnatović (MNE)
14 July 2013; 18:30	3× (yellow card) 3× (suspension)	Report	3× (yellow card) 5× (suspension)	Arena Zenica, Zenica; Attendance: 500; Referees: Pavićević, Ražnatović (MNE)

14 July 2013; 21:00	Brazil	25 – 21	Chile	Arena Zenica, Zenica; Attendance: 300; Referees: Li, Wang (CHN)
14 July 2013; 21:00	Silva 6	(10–10)	Reyes 9	Arena Zenica, Zenica; Attendance: 300; Referees: Li, Wang (CHN)
14 July 2013; 21:00	2× (yellow card) 3× (suspension)	Report	3× (yellow card) 2× (suspension)	Arena Zenica, Zenica; Attendance: 300; Referees: Li, Wang (CHN)

15 July 2013; 16:00	Egypt	21 – 34	Sweden	Arena Zenica, Zenica; Attendance: 500; Referees: Volodkov, Zotin (RUS)
15 July 2013; 16:00	Osama Mohamed 4	(8–16)	Pettersson 5	Arena Zenica, Zenica; Attendance: 500; Referees: Volodkov, Zotin (RUS)
15 July 2013; 16:00	3× (yellow card) 3× (suspension)	Report	3× (yellow card) 7× (suspension)	Arena Zenica, Zenica; Attendance: 500; Referees: Volodkov, Zotin (RUS)

15 July 2013; 18:30	Chile	21 – 38	Spain	Arena Zenica, Zenica; Attendance: 300; Referees: Pavićević, Ražnatović (MNE)
15 July 2013; 18:30	three players 4	(13–21)	three players 6	Arena Zenica, Zenica; Attendance: 300; Referees: Pavićević, Ražnatović (MNE)
15 July 2013; 18:30	3× (yellow card) 4× (suspension)	Report	3× (yellow card) 1× (suspension)	Arena Zenica, Zenica; Attendance: 300; Referees: Pavićević, Ražnatović (MNE)

15 July 2013; 21:00	Kuwait	23 – 25	Brazil	Arena Zenica, Zenica; Attendance: 200; Referees: Reveret, Pichon (FRA)
15 July 2013; 21:00	Al-Gharaballi 6	(10–13)	Silva 5	Arena Zenica, Zenica; Attendance: 200; Referees: Reveret, Pichon (FRA)
15 July 2013; 21:00	3× (yellow card) 6× (suspension)	Report	3× (yellow card) 4× (suspension)	Arena Zenica, Zenica; Attendance: 200; Referees: Reveret, Pichon (FRA)

17 July 2013; 16:00	Spain	36 – 27	Kuwait	Arena Zenica, Zenica; Attendance: 300; Referees: Erdoğan, Özdeniz (TUR)
17 July 2013; 16:00	Sáez Lozano 8	(17–11)	Al-Gharaballi 7	Arena Zenica, Zenica; Attendance: 300; Referees: Erdoğan, Özdeniz (TUR)
17 July 2013; 16:00	3× (yellow card) 3× (suspension)	Report	3× (yellow card) 5× (suspension)	Arena Zenica, Zenica; Attendance: 300; Referees: Erdoğan, Özdeniz (TUR)

17 July 2013; 18:30	Sweden	29 – 28	Brazil	Arena Zenica, Zenica; Attendance: 800; Referees: Allade, Dagba (BEN)
17 July 2013; 18:30	Berg 8	(14–15)	Santos 8	Arena Zenica, Zenica; Attendance: 800; Referees: Allade, Dagba (BEN)
17 July 2013; 18:30	3× (yellow card) 5× (suspension)	Report	2× (yellow card) 3× (suspension)	Arena Zenica, Zenica; Attendance: 800; Referees: Allade, Dagba (BEN)

17 July 2013; 21:00	Egypt	29 – 15	Chile	Arena Zenica, Zenica; Attendance: 200; Referees: Boualloucha, Khenissi (TUN)
17 July 2013; 21:00	Tamer Moustafa 5	(14–8)	Salazar 4	Arena Zenica, Zenica; Attendance: 200; Referees: Boualloucha, Khenissi (TUN)
17 July 2013; 21:00	3× (yellow card) 6× (suspension)	Report	3× (yellow card) 2× (suspension)	Arena Zenica, Zenica; Attendance: 200; Referees: Boualloucha, Khenissi (TUN)

18 July 2013; 16:00	Brazil	21 – 29	Spain	Arena Zenica, Zenica; Attendance: 300; Referees: Volodkov, Zotin (RUS)
18 July 2013; 16:00	Santos, Patrianova 5	(8–17)	three players 5	Arena Zenica, Zenica; Attendance: 300; Referees: Volodkov, Zotin (RUS)
18 July 2013; 16:00	4× (yellow card) 9× (suspension)	Report	3× (yellow card) 1× (suspension)	Arena Zenica, Zenica; Attendance: 300; Referees: Volodkov, Zotin (RUS)

18 July 2013; 18:30	Sweden	42 – 15	Chile	Arena Zenica, Zenica; Attendance: 300; Referees: Birch, Stenrand (DEN)
18 July 2013; 18:30	Pettersson 7	(18–11)	Salazar 4	Arena Zenica, Zenica; Attendance: 300; Referees: Birch, Stenrand (DEN)
18 July 2013; 18:30	3× (yellow card) 5× (suspension)	Report	3× (yellow card) 2× (suspension) 1× (red card)	Arena Zenica, Zenica; Attendance: 300; Referees: Birch, Stenrand (DEN)

18 July 2013; 21:00	Kuwait	27 – 31	Egypt	Arena Zenica, Zenica; Attendance: 200; Referees: Li, Wang (CHN)
18 July 2013; 21:00	Al-Gharaballi 12	(15–20)	Agamy 7	Arena Zenica, Zenica; Attendance: 200; Referees: Li, Wang (CHN)
18 July 2013; 21:00	3× (yellow card) 2× (suspension)	Report	4× (yellow card) 6× (suspension)	Arena Zenica, Zenica; Attendance: 200; Referees: Li, Wang (CHN)

20 July 2013; 16:00	Chile	32 – 33	Kuwait	Arena Zenica, Zenica; Attendance: 200; Referees: Allade, Dagba (BEN)
20 July 2013; 16:00	Salazar 8	(14–18)	Albaloul 10	Arena Zenica, Zenica; Attendance: 200; Referees: Allade, Dagba (BEN)
20 July 2013; 16:00	4× (yellow card) 5× (suspension)	Report	3× (yellow card) 7× (suspension)	Arena Zenica, Zenica; Attendance: 200; Referees: Allade, Dagba (BEN)

20 July 2013; 18:30	Brazil	24 – 27	Egypt	Arena Zenica, Zenica; Attendance: 500; Referees: Birch, Stenrand (DEN)
20 July 2013; 18:30	Patrianova 6	(12–12)	Khalil 6	Arena Zenica, Zenica; Attendance: 500; Referees: Birch, Stenrand (DEN)
20 July 2013; 18:30	3× (yellow card) 6× (suspension)	Report	3× (yellow card) 5× (suspension)	Arena Zenica, Zenica; Attendance: 500; Referees: Birch, Stenrand (DEN)

20 July 2013; 21:00	Spain	27 – 37	Sweden	Arena Zenica, Zenica; Attendance: 500; Referees: Pichon, Reveret (FRA)
20 July 2013; 21:00	Rodríguez, Reixach Prat 5	(12–17)	Berg 9	Arena Zenica, Zenica; Attendance: 500; Referees: Pichon, Reveret (FRA)
20 July 2013; 21:00	3× (yellow card) 1× (suspension)	Report	3× (yellow card) 4× (suspension)	Arena Zenica, Zenica; Attendance: 500; Referees: Pichon, Reveret (FRA)

== Knockout round ==
=== Championship ===
Round of 16
B1	Germany	20
A4	France	21
D3	Egypt	28 ET
C2	Bosnia and Herzegovina	25
B3	Netherlands	26
A2	Serbia	25
D1	Sweden	36
C4	Argentina	21
C3	Hungary	28
D2	Spain	38
A1	Denmark	26
B4	Switzerland	29
A3	Tunisia	17
B2	Croatia	29
C1	Slovenia	20
D4	Brazil	25

Quarterfinals
A4	France	35
D3	Egypt	33
B3	Netherlands	25
D1	Sweden	30
D2	Spain	26
B4	Switzerland	22
B2	Croatia	23
D4	Brazil	21

Semifinals
A4	France	24
D1	Sweden	29
D2	Spain	36 ET
B2	Croatia	35

Final
D1	Sweden	28
D2	Spain	23
Third place
A4	France	32
B2	Croatia	27

==== Round of 16 ====
22 July 2013; 13:30	Germany	20 – 21	France	Dvorana Mirza Delibašić, Sarajevo; Attendance: 200; Referees: Pavićević, Ražnatović (MNE)
22 July 2013; 13:30	Feld 4	(12–13)	Minel 7	Dvorana Mirza Delibašić, Sarajevo; Attendance: 200; Referees: Pavićević, Ražnatović (MNE)
22 July 2013; 13:30	2× (yellow card) 2× (suspension)	Report	3× (yellow card) 6× (suspension)	Dvorana Mirza Delibašić, Sarajevo; Attendance: 200; Referees: Pavićević, Ražnatović (MNE)

22 July 2013; 13:30	Slovenia	20 – 25	Brazil	Olympic Hall, Sarajevo; Attendance: 250; Referees: Volodkov, Zotin (RUS)
22 July 2013; 13:30	Hrastnik 8	(9–12)	Santos 6	Olympic Hall, Sarajevo; Attendance: 250; Referees: Volodkov, Zotin (RUS)
22 July 2013; 13:30	3× (yellow card) 5× (suspension)	Report	2× (yellow card) 5× (suspension)	Olympic Hall, Sarajevo; Attendance: 250; Referees: Volodkov, Zotin (RUS)

22 July 2013; 16:00	Tunisia	17 – 29	Croatia	Dvorana Mirza Delibašić, Sarajevo; Attendance: 300; Referees: Birch, Stenrand (DEN)
22 July 2013; 16:00	Essais 5	(8–11)	Vuglac 10	Dvorana Mirza Delibašić, Sarajevo; Attendance: 300; Referees: Birch, Stenrand (DEN)
22 July 2013; 16:00	2× (yellow card) 4× (suspension)	Report	3× (yellow card) 4× (suspension)	Dvorana Mirza Delibašić, Sarajevo; Attendance: 300; Referees: Birch, Stenrand (DEN)

22 July 2013; 16:00	Hungary	28 – 38	Spain	Olympic Hall, Sarajevo; Referees: Pichon, Reveret (FRA)
22 July 2013; 16:00	Szöllösi 7	(13–20)	Sáez Lozano 10	Olympic Hall, Sarajevo; Referees: Pichon, Reveret (FRA)
22 July 2013; 16:00	2× (yellow card) 4× (suspension)	Report	3× (yellow card) 2× (suspension)	Olympic Hall, Sarajevo; Referees: Pichon, Reveret (FRA)

22 July 2013; 18:30	Denmark	26 – 29	Switzerland	Dvorana Mirza Delibašić, Sarajevo; Attendance: 500; Referees: Konjičanin, Konjičanin (BIH)
22 July 2013; 18:30	three players 5	(12–14)	Maros 10	Dvorana Mirza Delibašić, Sarajevo; Attendance: 500; Referees: Konjičanin, Konjičanin (BIH)
22 July 2013; 18:30	3× (yellow card) 2× (suspension)	Report	2× (yellow card) 5× (suspension)	Dvorana Mirza Delibašić, Sarajevo; Attendance: 500; Referees: Konjičanin, Konjičanin (BIH)

22 July 2013; 18:30	Sweden	36 – 21	Argentina	Olympic Hall, Sarajevo; Attendance: 300; Referees: Al-Mutawa, Al-Suwailem (KUW)
22 July 2013; 18:30	Pettersson 7	(17–10)	Schuld 4	Olympic Hall, Sarajevo; Attendance: 300; Referees: Al-Mutawa, Al-Suwailem (KUW)
22 July 2013; 18:30	3× (yellow card) 7× (suspension)	Report	3× (yellow card) 5× (suspension)	Olympic Hall, Sarajevo; Attendance: 300; Referees: Al-Mutawa, Al-Suwailem (KUW)

22 July 2013; 21:00	Netherlands	26 – 25	Serbia	Dvorana Mirza Delibašić, Sarajevo; Attendance: 400; Referees: Brkić, Jusufhodžić (AUT)
22 July 2013; 21:00	Benghanem, van den Beucken 6	(13–10)	Đekić, Pešić 6	Dvorana Mirza Delibašić, Sarajevo; Attendance: 400; Referees: Brkić, Jusufhodžić (AUT)
22 July 2013; 21:00	3× (yellow card) 4× (suspension)	Report	3× (yellow card) 7× (suspension)	Dvorana Mirza Delibašić, Sarajevo; Attendance: 400; Referees: Brkić, Jusufhodžić (AUT)

22 July 2013
21:00
Egypt
28 – 25 (ET)
Bosnia and Herzegovina
Olympic Hall, Sarajevo
Attendance: 8,000
Referees: Mazeika, Gatelis (LTU)
Yahia 8
(14–11)
Perić 9
3× (yellow card) 4× (suspension)
Report
4× (yellow card) 6× (suspension)

FT: 22–22 ET: 6–3

==== Quarterfinals ====
24 July 2013; 13:30	France	35 – 33	Egypt	Olympic Hall, Sarajevo; Attendance: 200; Referees: Volodkov, Zotin (RUS)
24 July 2013; 13:30	Minel 10	(14–16)	Khalil 12	Olympic Hall, Sarajevo; Attendance: 200; Referees: Volodkov, Zotin (RUS)
24 July 2013; 13:30	3× (yellow card) 5× (suspension)	Report	3× (yellow card) 4× (suspension)	Olympic Hall, Sarajevo; Attendance: 200; Referees: Volodkov, Zotin (RUS)

24 July 2013; 16:00	Netherlands	25 – 30	Sweden	Olympic Hall, Sarajevo; Attendance: 300; Referees: Gatelis, Mazeika (LTU)
24 July 2013; 16:00	Baart 6	(13–10)	three players 5	Olympic Hall, Sarajevo; Attendance: 300; Referees: Gatelis, Mazeika (LTU)
24 July 2013; 16:00	2× (yellow card) 6× (suspension)	Report	4× (yellow card) 5× (suspension)	Olympic Hall, Sarajevo; Attendance: 300; Referees: Gatelis, Mazeika (LTU)

24 July 2013; 18:30	Spain	26 – 22	Switzerland	Olympic Hall, Sarajevo; Attendance: 450; Referees: Erdoğan, Özdeniz (TUR)
24 July 2013; 18:30	Dujshebaev 8	(13–12)	Jud 5	Olympic Hall, Sarajevo; Attendance: 450; Referees: Erdoğan, Özdeniz (TUR)
24 July 2013; 18:30	3× (yellow card) 4× (suspension)	Report	3× (yellow card) 6× (suspension) 1× (red card)	Olympic Hall, Sarajevo; Attendance: 450; Referees: Erdoğan, Özdeniz (TUR)

24 July 2013; 21:00	Croatia	23 – 21	Brazil	Olympic Hall, Sarajevo; Attendance: 500; Referees: Pichon, Reveret (FRA)
24 July 2013; 21:00	Kaleb 5	(10–11)	Santos 7	Olympic Hall, Sarajevo; Attendance: 500; Referees: Pichon, Reveret (FRA)
24 July 2013; 21:00	4× (yellow card) 3× (suspension)	Report	3× (yellow card) 6× (suspension)	Olympic Hall, Sarajevo; Attendance: 500; Referees: Pichon, Reveret (FRA)

==== Semifinals ====
26 July 2013; 18:30	France	24 – 29	Sweden	Olympic Hall, Sarajevo; Attendance: 350; Referees: Lah, Sok (SLO)
26 July 2013; 18:30	Camarero 5	(11–17)	Lagergren, Pettersson 7	Olympic Hall, Sarajevo; Attendance: 350; Referees: Lah, Sok (SLO)
26 July 2013; 18:30	3× (yellow card) 6× (suspension)	Report	3× (yellow card) 2× (suspension)	Olympic Hall, Sarajevo; Attendance: 350; Referees: Lah, Sok (SLO)

26 July 2013
21:00
Spain
36 – 35 (ET)
Croatia
Olympic Hall, Sarajevo
Attendance: 700
Referees: Birch, Stenrand (DEN)
Cacheda Gonzaléz 7
(17–12)
Ivić 8
3× (yellow card) 7× (suspension)
Report
4× (yellow card) 7× (suspension)

FT: 30–30 ET: 6–5

==== Third place game ====
28 July 2013; 14:00	France	32 – 27	Croatia	Olympic Hall, Sarajevo; Attendance: 1,200; Referees: Erdoğan, Özdeniz (TUR)
28 July 2013; 14:00	Minel 8	(15–11)	Vuglač 5	Olympic Hall, Sarajevo; Attendance: 1,200; Referees: Erdoğan, Özdeniz (TUR)
28 July 2013; 14:00	3× (yellow card) 4× (suspension)	Report	4× (yellow card) 4× (suspension)	Olympic Hall, Sarajevo; Attendance: 1,200; Referees: Erdoğan, Özdeniz (TUR)

==== Final ====
28 July 2013; 17:00	Sweden	28 – 23	Spain	Olympic Hall, Sarajevo; Attendance: 2,000; Referees: Gatelis, Mazeika (LTU)
28 July 2013; 17:00	Lagergren, Berg 6	(12–10)	Dujshebaev 5	Olympic Hall, Sarajevo; Attendance: 2,000; Referees: Gatelis, Mazeika (LTU)
28 July 2013; 17:00	4× (yellow card) 6× (suspension)	Report	3× (yellow card) 4× (suspension)	Olympic Hall, Sarajevo; Attendance: 2,000; Referees: Gatelis, Mazeika (LTU)

=== 5–8th place playoff ===
5–8th place semifinals
26 July
Egypt	27
Netherlands	28
26 July
Switzerland	24
Brazil	25

Fifth place game
27 July
Netherlands	30
Brazil	26
Seventh place game
27 July
Egypt	26
Switzerland	28

==== 5–8th place semifinals ====
26 July 2013; 13:30	Egypt	27 – 28	Netherlands	Olympic Hall, Sarajevo; Attendance: 100; Referees: Brkić, Jusufhodžić (AUT)
26 July 2013; 13:30	Khalil 9	(10–13)	Falke 6	Olympic Hall, Sarajevo; Attendance: 100; Referees: Brkić, Jusufhodžić (AUT)
26 July 2013; 13:30	2× (yellow card) 3× (suspension)	Report	3× (yellow card) 2× (suspension)	Olympic Hall, Sarajevo; Attendance: 100; Referees: Brkić, Jusufhodžić (AUT)

26 July 2013; 16:00	Switzerland	24 – 25	Brazil	Olympic Hall, Sarajevo; Attendance: 100; Referees: Pavićević, Ražnatović (MNE)
26 July 2013; 16:00	Jud 12	(11–12)	Silva, Dias 6	Olympic Hall, Sarajevo; Attendance: 100; Referees: Pavićević, Ražnatović (MNE)
26 July 2013; 16:00	3× (yellow card) 3× (suspension)	Report	3× (yellow card) 3× (suspension)	Olympic Hall, Sarajevo; Attendance: 100; Referees: Pavićević, Ražnatović (MNE)

==== Seventh place game ====
27 July 2013; 18:45	Egypt	26 – 28	Switzerland	Olympic Hall, Sarajevo; Attendance: 200; Referees: Hizaki, Ikebuchi (JPN)
27 July 2013; 18:45	Alaa El Din Ahmed 7	(11–11)	three players 6	Olympic Hall, Sarajevo; Attendance: 200; Referees: Hizaki, Ikebuchi (JPN)
27 July 2013; 18:45	3× (yellow card) 5× (suspension)	Report	4× (yellow card) 3× (suspension) 1× (red card)	Olympic Hall, Sarajevo; Attendance: 200; Referees: Hizaki, Ikebuchi (JPN)

==== Fifth place game ====
27 July 2013; 21:00	Netherlands	30 – 26	Brazil	Olympic Hall, Sarajevo; Attendance: 100; Referees: Abdelaziz, El-Moamly (EGY)
27 July 2013; 21:00	Polman 9	(17–12)	Dias, Martins 5	Olympic Hall, Sarajevo; Attendance: 100; Referees: Abdelaziz, El-Moamly (EGY)
27 July 2013; 21:00	3× (yellow card) 5× (suspension)	Report	3× (yellow card)	Olympic Hall, Sarajevo; Attendance: 100; Referees: Abdelaziz, El-Moamly (EGY)

=== 9–16th place playoff ===
9–16th quarterfinals
23 July
Germany	29
Bosnia and Herzegovina	28
23 July
Serbia	26
Argentina	25
23 July
Hungary	35
Denmark	33
23 July
Tunisia	24
Slovenia	28

9–16th semifinals
25 July
Germany	31
Serbia	32
25 July
Hungary	19
Slovenia	23

Ninth place game
27 July
Serbia	30
Slovenia	33
Eleventh place game
27 July
Germany	28
Hungary	27

==== 9–16th quarterfinals ====
23 July 2013; 17:30	Germany	29 – 28	Bosnia and Herzegovina	Olympic Hall, Sarajevo; Attendance: 400; Referees: Boldokov, Zotin (RUS)
23 July 2013; 17:30	Dahlhaus 6	(15–19)	Građan, Zulfić 6	Olympic Hall, Sarajevo; Attendance: 400; Referees: Boldokov, Zotin (RUS)
23 July 2013; 17:30	3× (yellow card) 1× (suspension)	Report	4× (yellow card) 2× (suspension)	Olympic Hall, Sarajevo; Attendance: 400; Referees: Boldokov, Zotin (RUS)

23 July 2013; 17:30	Hungary	35 – 33	Denmark	Dvorana Mirza Delibašić, Sarajevo; Attendance: 100; Referees: Abdelaziz, El-Moamly (EGY)
23 July 2013; 17:30	Zdolik 8	(19–15)	Juul Lassen 7	Dvorana Mirza Delibašić, Sarajevo; Attendance: 100; Referees: Abdelaziz, El-Moamly (EGY)
23 July 2013; 17:30	3× (yellow card) 7× (suspension)	Report	3× (yellow card) 3× (suspension)	Dvorana Mirza Delibašić, Sarajevo; Attendance: 100; Referees: Abdelaziz, El-Moamly (EGY)

23 July 2013; 20:00	Serbia	26 – 25	Argentina	Olympic Hall, Sarajevo; Attendance: 300; Referees: Boualloucha, Khenissi (TUN)
23 July 2013; 20:00	Radivojević 8	(10–12)	Amato 8	Olympic Hall, Sarajevo; Attendance: 300; Referees: Boualloucha, Khenissi (TUN)
23 July 2013; 20:00	3× (yellow card) 4× (suspension)	Report	3× (yellow card) 3× (suspension)	Olympic Hall, Sarajevo; Attendance: 300; Referees: Boualloucha, Khenissi (TUN)

23 July 2013; 21:00	Tunisia	24 – 28	Slovenia	Dvorana Mirza Delibašić, Sarajevo; Attendance: 100; Referees: Hizaki, Ikebuchi (JPN)
23 July 2013; 21:00	Souissi 8	(11–14)	Kodrin 8	Dvorana Mirza Delibašić, Sarajevo; Attendance: 100; Referees: Hizaki, Ikebuchi (JPN)
23 July 2013; 21:00	2× (yellow card) 6× (suspension)	Report	2× (yellow card) 5× (suspension)	Dvorana Mirza Delibašić, Sarajevo; Attendance: 100; Referees: Hizaki, Ikebuchi (JPN)

==== 9–12th semifinals ====
25 July 2013; 12:30	Germany	31 – 32	Serbia	Olympic Hall, Sarajevo; Attendance: 100; Referees: Konjičanin, Konjičanin (BIH)
25 July 2013; 12:30	Dahlhaus 7	(18–18)	Ilić 11	Olympic Hall, Sarajevo; Attendance: 100; Referees: Konjičanin, Konjičanin (BIH)
25 July 2013; 12:30	3× (yellow card) 2× (suspension)	Report	3× (yellow card) 4× (suspension)	Olympic Hall, Sarajevo; Attendance: 100; Referees: Konjičanin, Konjičanin (BIH)

25 July 2013; 20:00	Hungary	19 – 23	Slovenia	Olympic Hall, Sarajevo; Attendance: 100; Referees: Birch, Stenrand (DEN)
25 July 2013; 20:00	Zdolik 5	(12–10)	Spende 6	Olympic Hall, Sarajevo; Attendance: 100; Referees: Birch, Stenrand (DEN)
25 July 2013; 20:00	3× (yellow card) 1× (suspension)	Report	3× (yellow card) 5× (suspension)	Olympic Hall, Sarajevo; Attendance: 100; Referees: Birch, Stenrand (DEN)

==== Eleventh place game ====
27 July 2013; 14:15	Germany	28 – 27	Hungary	Olympic Hall, Sarajevo; Attendance: 450; Referees: Li, Wang (CHN)
27 July 2013; 14:15	Musche, Ernst 5	(17–12)	Szöllösi 8	Olympic Hall, Sarajevo; Attendance: 450; Referees: Li, Wang (CHN)
27 July 2013; 14:15	2× (yellow card) 7× (suspension) 1× (red card)	Report	3× (yellow card) 2× (suspension)	Olympic Hall, Sarajevo; Attendance: 450; Referees: Li, Wang (CHN)

==== Ninth place game ====
27 July 2013; 16:30	Serbia	30 – 33	Slovenia	Olympic Hall, Sarajevo; Attendance: 300; Referees: González, Prieto (URU)
27 July 2013; 16:30	Radivojević 8	(12–15)	Šoštarič 11	Olympic Hall, Sarajevo; Attendance: 300; Referees: González, Prieto (URU)
27 July 2013; 16:30	3× (yellow card) 2× (suspension)	Report	3× (yellow card) 1× (suspension)	Olympic Hall, Sarajevo; Attendance: 300; Referees: González, Prieto (URU)

=== 13–16th place playoff ===
13–16th place semifinals
25 July
Bosnia and Herzegovina	36
Argentina	29
25 July
Denmark	29
Tunisia	26

13th place game
27 July
Bosnia and Herzegovina	35
Denmark	36
15th place game
27 July
Argentina	17
Tunisia	33

==== 13–16th place semifinals ====
25 July 2013; 15:00	Denmark	29 – 26	Tunisia	Olympic Hall, Sarajevo; Attendance: 100; Referees: Lah, Sok (SLO)
25 July 2013; 15:00	Baagoe 7	(17–12)	Essais 7	Olympic Hall, Sarajevo; Attendance: 100; Referees: Lah, Sok (SLO)
25 July 2013; 15:00	3× (yellow card) 2× (suspension)	Report	2× (yellow card) 1× (suspension)	Olympic Hall, Sarajevo; Attendance: 100; Referees: Lah, Sok (SLO)

25 July 2013; 17:30	Bosnia and Herzegovina	36 – 29	Argentina	Olympic Hall, Sarajevo; Attendance: 200; Referees: Al-Mutawa, Al-Suwailem (KUW)
25 July 2013; 17:30	Građan 10	(16–12)	Bono 9	Olympic Hall, Sarajevo; Attendance: 200; Referees: Al-Mutawa, Al-Suwailem (KUW)
25 July 2013; 17:30	3× (yellow card) 3× (suspension)	Report	2× (yellow card) 6× (suspension)	Olympic Hall, Sarajevo; Attendance: 200; Referees: Al-Mutawa, Al-Suwailem (KUW)

==== 15th place game ====
27 July 2013; 09:45	Argentina	17 – 33	Tunisia	Olympic Hall, Sarajevo; Attendance: 50; Referees: Allade, Dagba (BEN)
27 July 2013; 09:45	Baronetto 5	(9–17)	Essais, Soussi 7	Olympic Hall, Sarajevo; Attendance: 50; Referees: Allade, Dagba (BEN)
27 July 2013; 09:45	2× (yellow card) 6× (suspension)	Report	3× (yellow card) 3× (suspension)	Olympic Hall, Sarajevo; Attendance: 50; Referees: Allade, Dagba (BEN)

==== 13th place game ====
27 July 2013; 12:00	Bosnia and Herzegovina	35 – 36	Denmark	Olympic Hall, Sarajevo; Attendance: 200; Referees: Boualloucha, Khenissi (TUN)
27 July 2013; 12:00	Građan 11	(17–15)	Christensen 10	Olympic Hall, Sarajevo; Attendance: 200; Referees: Boualloucha, Khenissi (TUN)
27 July 2013; 12:00	4× (yellow card) 5× (suspension)	Report	3× (yellow card) 3× (suspension)	Olympic Hall, Sarajevo; Attendance: 200; Referees: Boualloucha, Khenissi (TUN)

== President's Cup ==
=== 17–20th place playoff ===
17–20th place semifinals
22 July
Russia	28
Qatar	27
22 July
South Korea	28
Kuwait	26

17th place game
23 July
Russia	37
South Korea	33
19th place game
23 July
Qatar	38
Kuwait	22

==== 17–20th place semifinals ====
22 July 2013; 09:00	Russia	28 – 27	Qatar	Dvorana Mirza Delibašić, Sarajevo; Attendance: 100; Referees: Boualloucha, Khenissi (TUN)
22 July 2013; 09:00	Shelestyukov 7	(17–15)	Hamdoon 8	Dvorana Mirza Delibašić, Sarajevo; Attendance: 100; Referees: Boualloucha, Khenissi (TUN)
22 July 2013; 09:00	3× (yellow card) 8× (suspension)	Report	4× (yellow card) 3× (suspension)	Dvorana Mirza Delibašić, Sarajevo; Attendance: 100; Referees: Boualloucha, Khenissi (TUN)

22 July 2013; 11:15	South Korea	28 – 26	Kuwait	Dvorana Mirza Delibašić, Sarajevo; Attendance: 100; Referees: Hizaki, Ikebuchi (JPN)
22 July 2013; 11:15	Lee Hyoen-Sik 8	(19–13)	Algharaballi 13	Dvorana Mirza Delibašić, Sarajevo; Attendance: 100; Referees: Hizaki, Ikebuchi (JPN)
22 July 2013; 11:15	2× (yellow card) 4× (suspension)	Report	3× (yellow card) 2× (suspension)	Dvorana Mirza Delibašić, Sarajevo; Attendance: 100; Referees: Hizaki, Ikebuchi (JPN)

==== 19th place game ====
23 July 2013; 12:30	Qatar	38 – 22	Kuwait	Dvorana Mirza Delibašić, Sarajevo; Attendance: 100; Referees: Pavićević, Ražnatović (MNE)
23 July 2013; 12:30	Zouaoui 10	(19–11)	Al-Gharaballi 11	Dvorana Mirza Delibašić, Sarajevo; Attendance: 100; Referees: Pavićević, Ražnatović (MNE)
23 July 2013; 12:30	4× (yellow card) 8× (suspension)	Report	3× (yellow card) 6× (suspension)	Dvorana Mirza Delibašić, Sarajevo; Attendance: 100; Referees: Pavićević, Ražnatović (MNE)

==== 17th place game ====
23 July 2013; 15:00	Russia	37 – 33	South Korea	Dvorana Mirza Delibašić, Sarajevo; Attendance: 100; Referees: González, Prieto (URU)
23 July 2013; 15:00	Dereven, Shelestyukov 9	(18–14)	Lee Hyoen-Sik 9	Dvorana Mirza Delibašić, Sarajevo; Attendance: 100; Referees: González, Prieto (URU)
23 July 2013; 15:00	3× (yellow card) 6× (suspension)	Report		Dvorana Mirza Delibašić, Sarajevo; Attendance: 100; Referees: González, Prieto (URU)

=== 21–24th place playoff ===
21st–24th place semifinals
22 July
Angola	24
Algeria	23
22 July
Congo	32
Chile	30

21st place game
23 July
Angola	35
Congo	28
23rd place game
23 July
Algeria	27
Chile	28

==== 21st–24th place semifinals ====
22 July 2013; 09:00	Angola	24 – 23	Algeria	Olympic Hall, Sarajevo; Attendance: 100; Referees: Allade, Dagba (BEN)
22 July 2013; 09:00	Pestana 6	(12–8)	Daoud 7	Olympic Hall, Sarajevo; Attendance: 100; Referees: Allade, Dagba (BEN)
22 July 2013; 09:00	3× (yellow card) 4× (suspension) 1× (red card)	Report	4× (yellow card) 3× (suspension)	Olympic Hall, Sarajevo; Attendance: 100; Referees: Allade, Dagba (BEN)

22 July 2013; 11:15	Congo	32 – 30	Chile	Olympic Hall, Sarajevo; Attendance: 150; Referees: Li, Wang (CHN)
22 July 2013; 11:15	Mobombo Mopiti 9	(13–16)	Ceballos, Salazar 7	Olympic Hall, Sarajevo; Attendance: 150; Referees: Li, Wang (CHN)
22 July 2013; 11:15	3× (yellow card) 3× (suspension)	Report	3× (yellow card) 3× (suspension)	Olympic Hall, Sarajevo; Attendance: 150; Referees: Li, Wang (CHN)

==== 23rd place game ====
23 July 2013; 12:30	Algeria	27 – 28	Chile	Olympic Hall, Sarajevo; Attendance: 100; Referees: Erdoğan, Özdeniz (TUR)
23 July 2013; 12:30	Bencheikh 6	(15–13)	Reyes 9	Olympic Hall, Sarajevo; Attendance: 100; Referees: Erdoğan, Özdeniz (TUR)
23 July 2013; 12:30	3× (yellow card) 5× (suspension)	Report	4× (yellow card) 4× (suspension)	Olympic Hall, Sarajevo; Attendance: 100; Referees: Erdoğan, Özdeniz (TUR)

==== 21st place game ====
23 July 2013; 15:00	Angola	35 – 28	Congo	Olympic Hall, Sarajevo; Attendance: 100; Referees: Lah, Sok (SLO)
23 July 2013; 15:00	Pascoal 8	(14–16)	Angao 10	Olympic Hall, Sarajevo; Attendance: 100; Referees: Lah, Sok (SLO)
23 July 2013; 15:00	3× (yellow card) 2× (suspension)	Report	3× (yellow card) 3× (suspension)	Olympic Hall, Sarajevo; Attendance: 100; Referees: Lah, Sok (SLO)

== Final standings ==
Rank	Team
Gold medal	Sweden
Silver medal	Spain
Bronze medal	France
4	Croatia
5	Netherlands
6	Brazil
7	Switzerland
8	Egypt
9	Slovenia
10	Serbia
11	Germany
12	Hungary
13	Denmark
14	Bosnia and Herzegovina
15	Tunisia
16	Argentina
17	Russia
18	South Korea
19	Qatar
20	Kuwait
21	Angola
22	Congo
23	Chile
24	Algeria

== All-star team ==
- Goalkeeper: Peter Johannesson (SWE)
- Left wing: Andreas Berg (SWE)
- Left back: Quentin Minel (FRA)
- Pivot: Gonzalo Porras Peréz (ESP)
- Centre back: Pablo Cacheda Gonzales (ESP)
- Right back: Alex Dujshebaev (ESP)
- Right wing: Ante Tokić (CRO)
