= 2013 Pan American Men's Junior Handball Championship =

Tournament details
- Host country: Argentina
- Venue(s): 1 (in 1 host city)
- Dates: 18–24 March
- Teams: 9 (from 1 confederation)

Final positions
- Champions: Brazil (4th title)
- Runner-up: Argentina
- Third place: Chile
- Fourth place: Puerto Rico

Tournament statistics
- Matches played: 23
- Goals scored: 1,260 (54.78 per match)
- Top scorer(s): Héctor Hiraldo (PUR) (55 goals)

The 2013 Pan American Men's Junior Handball Championship took place in Mar del Plata from 18–24 March. It acts as the Pan American qualifying tournament for the 2013 Men's Junior World Handball Championship.

== Teams ==
Group A	Group B
Argentina; Chile; Uruguay; ~~Guatemala~~ * Mexico	Brazil; Canada; Venezuela; Paraguay; Puerto Rico

* Guatemala withdrew from this Pan American Junior Championship.

== Preliminary round ==
=== Group A ===
Team	Pld	W	D	L	GF	GA	GD	Pts
Argentina	3	3	0	0	87	48	+39	6
Chile	3	2	0	1	72	76	–4	4
Uruguay	3	1	0	2	58	59	–1	2
Mexico	3	0	0	3	58	92	–34	0

March 19; 13:30	Chile	33 – 28	Mexico	Polideportivo Islas Malvinas, Mar del Plata
March 19; 13:30	Salazar 7	(18–13)	Haas 7	Polideportivo Islas Malvinas, Mar del Plata
March 19; 13:30	3× (yellow card) 4× (suspension)	Report	1× (yellow card) 2× (suspension)	Polideportivo Islas Malvinas, Mar del Plata

March 19; 20:00	Argentina	24 – 14	Uruguay	Polideportivo Islas Malvinas, Mar del Plata; Referees: Rocha, Magalhães (BRA)
March 19; 20:00	Baroneto 7	(11–7)	Velazco 5	Polideportivo Islas Malvinas, Mar del Plata; Referees: Rocha, Magalhães (BRA)
March 19; 20:00	3× (yellow card) 2× (suspension)	Report	3× (yellow card) 2× (suspension)	Polideportivo Islas Malvinas, Mar del Plata; Referees: Rocha, Magalhães (BRA)

March 20; 16:00	Uruguay	17 – 20	Chile	Polideportivo Islas Malvinas, Mar del Plata; Referees: Souza, Paz (BRA)
March 20; 16:00	Velazco 5	(7–8)	Reyes 5	Polideportivo Islas Malvinas, Mar del Plata; Referees: Souza, Paz (BRA)
March 20; 16:00	3× (yellow card) 4× (suspension)	Report	2× (yellow card) 4× (suspension)	Polideportivo Islas Malvinas, Mar del Plata; Referees: Souza, Paz (BRA)

March 20; 20:00	Mexico	15 – 32	Argentina	Polideportivo Islas Malvinas, Mar del Plata; Referees: Duval, Alcântara (DOM)
March 20; 20:00	Contreras 6	(10–16)	Bono 6	Polideportivo Islas Malvinas, Mar del Plata; Referees: Duval, Alcântara (DOM)
March 20; 20:00	3× (yellow card) 3× (suspension)	Report	3× (yellow card) 1× (suspension)	Polideportivo Islas Malvinas, Mar del Plata; Referees: Duval, Alcântara (DOM)

March 21; 18:00	Uruguay	27 – 15	Mexico	Polideportivo Islas Malvinas, Mar del Plata; Referees: Lima, Quadros (BRA)
March 21; 18:00	Morandeira 10	(10–7)	Yael 5	Polideportivo Islas Malvinas, Mar del Plata; Referees: Lima, Quadros (BRA)
March 21; 18:00	3× (yellow card) 3× (suspension)	Report	3× (yellow card) 2× (suspension)	Polideportivo Islas Malvinas, Mar del Plata; Referees: Lima, Quadros (BRA)

March 21; 20:00	Argentina	31 – 19	Chile	Polideportivo Islas Malvinas, Mar del Plata; Referees: Sosa, Lemes (URU)
March 21; 20:00	Rodriguez, Baroneto 5	(11–12)	Muñoz 5	Polideportivo Islas Malvinas, Mar del Plata; Referees: Sosa, Lemes (URU)
March 21; 20:00	3× (yellow card) 3× (suspension)	Report	4× (yellow card) 4× (suspension)	Polideportivo Islas Malvinas, Mar del Plata; Referees: Sosa, Lemes (URU)

=== Group B ===
Team	Pld	W	D	L	GF	GA	GD	Pts
Brazil	3	4	0	0	169	81	+88	8
Puerto Rico	3	3	0	1	111	114	–3	6
Venezuela	3	2	0	2	122	128	–6	4
Canada	3	1	0	3	112	144	–32	2
Paraguay	3	0	0	4	87	134	–47	0

March 18; 16:00	Venezuela	33 – 35	Puerto Rico	Polideportivo Islas Malvinas, Mar del Plata; Referees: Souza, Paz (BRA)
March 18; 16:00	Palacios 12	(16–13)	Hiraldo 15	Polideportivo Islas Malvinas, Mar del Plata; Referees: Souza, Paz (BRA)
March 18; 16:00	3× (yellow card) 2× (suspension)	Report	2× (yellow card) 2× (suspension)	Polideportivo Islas Malvinas, Mar del Plata; Referees: Souza, Paz (BRA)

March 18; 18:00	Brazil	45 – 15	Paraguay	Polideportivo Islas Malvinas, Mar del Plata; Referees: Lenci, Grillo (ARG)
March 18; 18:00	Silva 6	(19–6)	Fatecha 5	Polideportivo Islas Malvinas, Mar del Plata; Referees: Lenci, Grillo (ARG)
March 18; 18:00	3× (yellow card) 4× (suspension)	Report	3× (yellow card) 3× (suspension)	Polideportivo Islas Malvinas, Mar del Plata; Referees: Lenci, Grillo (ARG)

March 19; 15:30	Paraguay	26 – 36	Canada	Polideportivo Islas Malvinas, Mar del Plata; Referees: Delgado, Burgos (ARG)
March 19; 15:30	Salinas 9	(16–19)	Touzel 15	Polideportivo Islas Malvinas, Mar del Plata; Referees: Delgado, Burgos (ARG)
March 19; 15:30	4× (yellow card) 5× (suspension) 1× (red card)	Report	3× (yellow card) 4× (suspension) 1× (red card)	Polideportivo Islas Malvinas, Mar del Plata; Referees: Delgado, Burgos (ARG)

March 19; 17:30	Puerto Rico	21 – 36	Brazil	Polideportivo Islas Malvinas, Mar del Plata
March 19; 17:30	Notario 11	(8–16)	three players 5	Polideportivo Islas Malvinas, Mar del Plata
March 19; 17:30	3× (yellow card) 2× (suspension)	Report		Polideportivo Islas Malvinas, Mar del Plata

March 20; 14:00	Paraguay	20 – 22	Puerto Rico	Polideportivo Islas Malvinas, Mar del Plata; Referees: Posch, Jorgensen (USA)
March 20; 14:00	Matignon 7	(9–9)	Hiraldo 6	Polideportivo Islas Malvinas, Mar del Plata; Referees: Posch, Jorgensen (USA)
March 20; 14:00	4× (yellow card) 5× (suspension)	Report	3× (yellow card) 5× (suspension)	Polideportivo Islas Malvinas, Mar del Plata; Referees: Posch, Jorgensen (USA)

March 20; 18:00	Canada	30 – 34	Venezuela	Polideportivo Islas Malvinas, Mar del Plata; Referees: Zapata, Ojeda (COL)
March 20; 18:00	four players 5	(11–14)	Palacios 10	Polideportivo Islas Malvinas, Mar del Plata; Referees: Zapata, Ojeda (COL)
March 20; 18:00	3× (yellow card) 6× (suspension)	Report	3× (yellow card) 4× (suspension)	Polideportivo Islas Malvinas, Mar del Plata; Referees: Zapata, Ojeda (COL)

March 21; 14:00	Canada	25 – 33	Puerto Rico	Polideportivo Islas Malvinas, Mar del Plata; Referees: Zanikian, Paolantoni (ARG)
March 21; 14:00	Touzel 7	(9–17)	Hiraldo 11	Polideportivo Islas Malvinas, Mar del Plata; Referees: Zanikian, Paolantoni (ARG)
March 21; 14:00	3× (yellow card) 2× (suspension)	Report	3× (yellow card) 3× (suspension)	Polideportivo Islas Malvinas, Mar del Plata; Referees: Zanikian, Paolantoni (ARG)

March 21; 16:00	Venezuela	24 – 37	Brazil	Polideportivo Islas Malvinas, Mar del Plata; Referees: Camacho, Ortiz (MEX)
March 21; 16:00	Vasquez 10	(11–15)	Andrade 8	Polideportivo Islas Malvinas, Mar del Plata; Referees: Camacho, Ortiz (MEX)
March 21; 16:00	2× (yellow card) 5× (suspension) 1× (red card)	Report	3× (yellow card) 4× (suspension)	Polideportivo Islas Malvinas, Mar del Plata; Referees: Camacho, Ortiz (MEX)

March 22; 16:00	Venezuela	31 – 26	Paraguay	Polideportivo Islas Malvinas, Mar del Plata
March 22; 16:00		(12–11)		Polideportivo Islas Malvinas, Mar del Plata
March 22; 16:00		Report		Polideportivo Islas Malvinas, Mar del Plata

March 22; 18:00	Brazil	51 – 21	Canada	Polideportivo Islas Malvinas, Mar del Plata; Referees: Aular, Ortega (VEN)
March 22; 18:00	Oliveira 6	(28–10)	Touzel 6	Polideportivo Islas Malvinas, Mar del Plata; Referees: Aular, Ortega (VEN)
March 22; 18:00	3× (yellow card) 3× (suspension)	Report	3× (yellow card) 4× (suspension)	Polideportivo Islas Malvinas, Mar del Plata; Referees: Aular, Ortega (VEN)

== Placement 7th–9th ==
=== 7th/9th ===
March 23; 14:00	Mexico	40 – 26	Paraguay	Polideportivo Islas Malvinas, Mar del Plata; Referees: Magalhães, Rocha (BRA)
March 23; 14:00	Yael 8	(18–15)	Salinas 7	Polideportivo Islas Malvinas, Mar del Plata; Referees: Magalhães, Rocha (BRA)
March 23; 14:00	4× (yellow card) 3× (suspension)	Report	3× (yellow card) 4× (suspension)	Polideportivo Islas Malvinas, Mar del Plata; Referees: Magalhães, Rocha (BRA)

=== 7th/8th ===
March 24; 16:00	Mexico	31 – 17	Canada	Polideportivo Islas Malvinas, Mar del Plata; Referees: Rodriguez, Rodriguez (PAR)
March 24; 16:00	Contreras 7	(12–10)	Touzel 9	Polideportivo Islas Malvinas, Mar del Plata; Referees: Rodriguez, Rodriguez (PAR)
March 24; 16:00	3× (yellow card) 4× (suspension)	Report	3× (yellow card) 3× (suspension)	Polideportivo Islas Malvinas, Mar del Plata; Referees: Rodriguez, Rodriguez (PAR)

== Placement 5th–6th ==
March 23; 20:00	Uruguay	34 – 27	Venezuela	Polideportivo Islas Malvinas, Mar del Plata; Referees: Zanikian, Paolantoni (ARG)
March 23; 20:00	Morandeira 11	(18–14)	Vasquez 8	Polideportivo Islas Malvinas, Mar del Plata; Referees: Zanikian, Paolantoni (ARG)
March 23; 20:00	2× (yellow card) 3× (suspension)	Report	3× (yellow card) 5× (suspension)	Polideportivo Islas Malvinas, Mar del Plata; Referees: Zanikian, Paolantoni (ARG)

== Final round ==
Semifinal
March 23 – Mar del Plata
Argentina	32
Puerto Rico	20
March 23 – Mar del Plata
Chile	17
Brazil	32

Final
March 24 – Mar del Plata
Argentina	21
Brazil	25
Third place
March 24 – Mar del Plata
Puerto Rico	28
Chile	34

=== Semifinals ===
March 23; 16:00	Argentina	32 – 20	Puerto Rico	Polideportivo Islas Malvinas, Mar del Plata; Referees: Posch, Jorgensen (USA)
March 23; 16:00	Foppiani, Simonet 5	(17–13)	Hiraldo 9	Polideportivo Islas Malvinas, Mar del Plata; Referees: Posch, Jorgensen (USA)
March 23; 16:00	3× (yellow card) 3× (suspension)	Report	3× (yellow card) 2× (suspension) 1× (red card)	Polideportivo Islas Malvinas, Mar del Plata; Referees: Posch, Jorgensen (USA)

March 23; 18:00	Brazil	32 – 17	Chile	Polideportivo Islas Malvinas, Mar del Plata; Referees: Lenci, Grillo (ARG)
March 23; 18:00	Medeiros 5	(15–6)	Ayala 4	Polideportivo Islas Malvinas, Mar del Plata; Referees: Lenci, Grillo (ARG)
March 23; 18:00	3× (yellow card) 4× (suspension)	Report	3× (yellow card)	Polideportivo Islas Malvinas, Mar del Plata; Referees: Lenci, Grillo (ARG)

=== Bronze-medal match ===
March 24; 16:00	Puerto Rico	28 – 34	Chile	Polideportivo Islas Malvinas, Mar del Plata; Referees: Souza, Paz (BRA)
March 24; 16:00	Nazario 12	(9–20)	Salazar 15	Polideportivo Islas Malvinas, Mar del Plata; Referees: Souza, Paz (BRA)
March 24; 16:00	3× (yellow card) 6× (suspension)	Report	2× (yellow card) 4× (suspension)	Polideportivo Islas Malvinas, Mar del Plata; Referees: Souza, Paz (BRA)

=== Gold-medal match ===
March 24; 14:00	Argentina	21 – 25	Brazil	Polideportivo Islas Malvinas, Mar del Plata
March 24; 14:00	Simonet 8	(11–11)	Silva 6	Polideportivo Islas Malvinas, Mar del Plata
March 24; 14:00	4× (yellow card) 4× (suspension)	Report	4× (yellow card) 3× (suspension) 1× (red card)	Polideportivo Islas Malvinas, Mar del Plata

== Final Standing ==
Rank	Team
Gold medal	Brazil
Silver medal	Argentina
Bronze medal	Chile
4	Puerto Rico
5	Uruguay
6	Venezuela
7	Mexico
8	Canada
9	Paraguay

Team advanced to the 2013 Men's Junior World Handball Championship
