= Josip Cavar =

Swedish handball player (born 1993)

Personal information
- Full name: Josip Cavar
- Nationality: Swedish/Bosnian
- Born: 3 October 1993 (age 33) Skövde, Sweden
- Height: 1.98 m (6 ft 6 in)

Sport
- Sport: Handball
- Position: Goalkeeper
- Current club: Amo Handboll
- Number: 1

Senior clubs
- Years: Team
- 2009-2014: Redbergslids IK
- 2013-2014: → Alstermo IF
- 2014-2016: Ystads IF
- 2016-2019: Lugi HF
- 2019-2021: SønderjyskE Håndbold
- 2021-2024: TTH Holstebro
- 2024-2025: KIF Kolding
- 2025-: Amo Handboll
National team
Years	Team	Apps	(Gls)
2019-	Sweden	2	(0)

Josip Cavar (born 3 October 1993) is a Swedish handball player for Amo Handboll and the Swedish national team.

== Career ==
Cavar's mother club is Vetlanda HF. He moved to Gothenburg to go to handball high school there, and then started playing for Redbergslids IK, already as a 16-year-old.

He came to KIF Kolding after several seasons at TTH Holstebro. In the 2024-25 season with KIF Kolding he suffered relegation, after finishing last in the regular season. This was the first relegation for the team in 41 years. He has announced that he will leave the club after the season.

Because he also has origins from Bosnia and Herzegovina, he has played for their U-national teams, including in the U21 WC 2013. He made his international debut on the Swedish national team in July 2019, against Japan.

He then moved back to Sweden and joined Amo Handboll on a 2 year deal with an optional extension of 1 year.

== Private life ==
He is cohabiting with Swedish national team player Melissa Petrén.
