= Nemoguće Vruće =

Bosnian pop-rock band

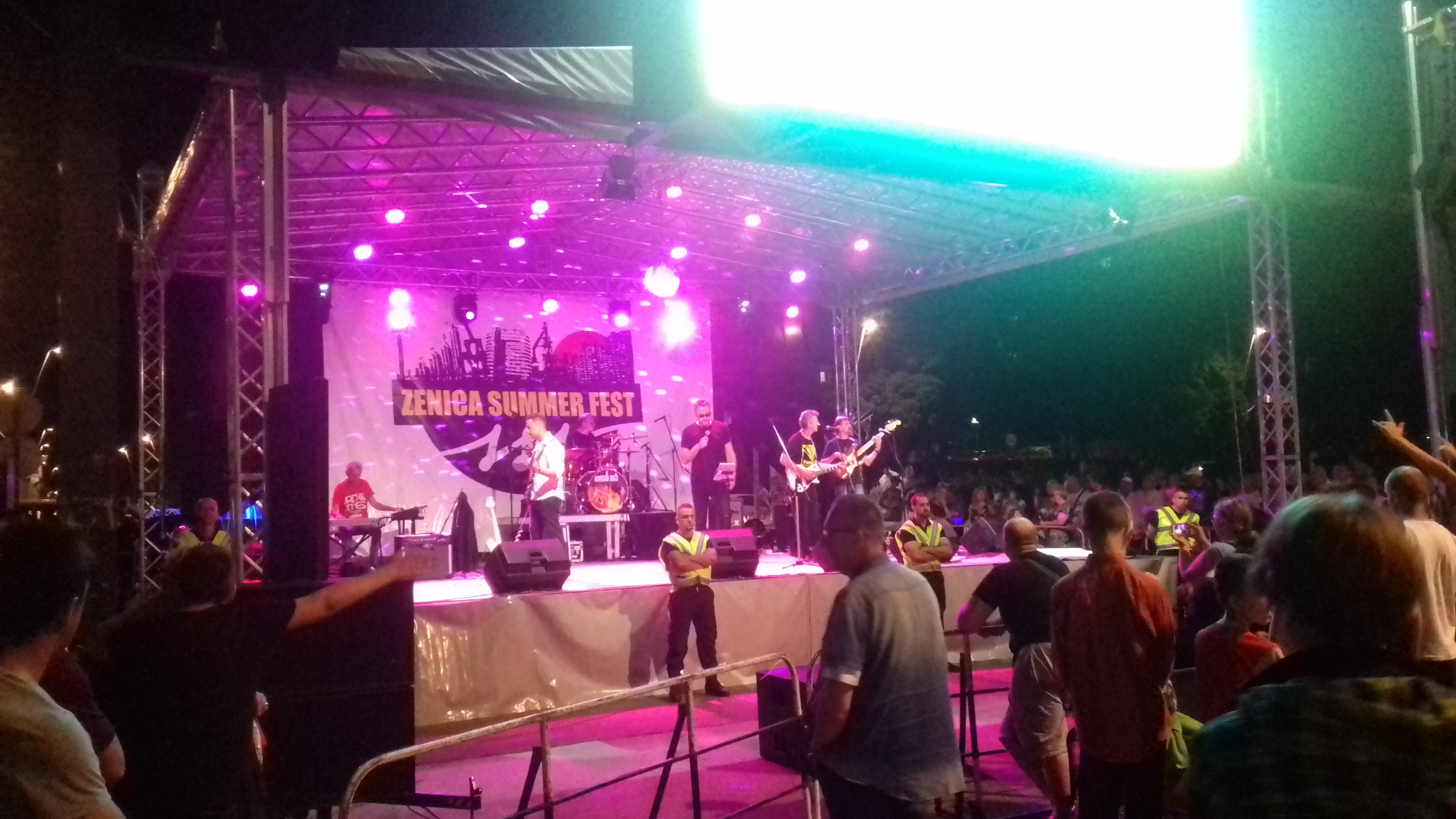
- Nemoguće Vruće performing live on Zenica summer fest in July 2019

Background information
- Origin: Zenica, SR Bosnia and Herzegovina, SFR Yugoslavia
- Genres: rock
- Years active: 1986–1990; 2011–today
- Labels: Jugoton
- Members: Branislav Lovrić; Edin Kulalić; Miro Kovačević; Želimir Jukić; Igor Jukić; Sandro Kovačević; Aleksandar Golić
- Past members: Asmir Spahić; Josip Jajčević; Mladen Vidović; Zoran Polić; Željko Brodarić Japa

Nemoguće vruće (lit. Impossibly Hot) is a Bosnian pop-rock group from Zenica dating from 1986. Very soon upon its establishment it became the best and then only Zenica rock band.

The group was founded in June 1988 (date of the debut album) by its frontman, then young singer and 23-year-old student Mladen Vidović. The group had seven members, teenagers, upon its foundation. Nemoguće vruće is characterized by not having usual affluence of well known "Sarajevo pop-rock school" in their music and lyrics i.e. folk elements are not present; their music is also somewhat "sweet pop".

Zenica group has been active since 1986 until 1990s when they disbanded due to Bosnian War. On 16 April 2011, group members reunited (after 23 years of pause) in Zenica for a return concert – location of the performance was restaurant "Tapas" (former "Kasina"); on 25 November (BiH Statehood Day) 2011, they reunited for a return concert in Sarajevo – location of the performance was club "Cinemas-Sloga".

On 21 March 2015 Nemoguće vruće held a concert in Arena Zenica, as a part of 20th International festival "Zenica spring" (RETROMANIA Zenica 2015) that marked 50 years of rock scene. They performed with other Zenica musicians: Extra 2000, Rima band, The Badmakers, Ze selekcija, Gong and Taxi band.

On 27 July 2019 Lovrić and his band gave a 1.5-hour live performance on Zenica city square – as one of many concerts during Zenica summer fest 2019 (third main show of this festival). They performed, among other songs, songs of the band they get sometimes mixed with – Ritam Srca.

== Band members ==
- Branislav Lovrić – vocal
- Edin Kulalić – drums
- Miro Kovačević – guitar
- Želimir Jukić – keyboards
- Igor Jukić – guitar
- Sandro Kovačević – guitar
- Aleksandar Golić – bass guitar

Past

- Asmir Spahić
- Josip Jajčević
- Mladen Vidović
- Zoran Polić
- Željko Brodarić Japa

== Discography ==
Studio albums

- Ljubavi Malog Werthera (Jugoton, 1987)
- Ljubavi Malog Werthera (reedition, 2013)
  - songs: "Ameri"; "Hajde noći padajte"; "Kad skupi se raja"; "Ljubav mladog Werthera"; "Nema cure koja neće"; "One kao ne bi da se ljube"; "Picerija (Daj, da poljubim)"; "Pjeva Rusija"; "Sve su klinke izašle iz škole"

Singles

- "Hajde Noći Padajte (Samo Vrbas Zna)" / "Pjeva Rusija" (Jugoton, 1987)
