= Polideportivo Islas Malvinas =

Sports venue in Mar del Plata, Argentina

Islas Malvinas Sports Centre
- Polideportivo Islas Malvinas
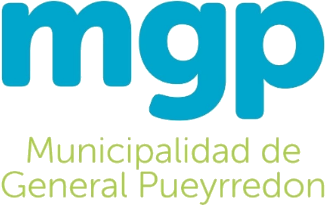

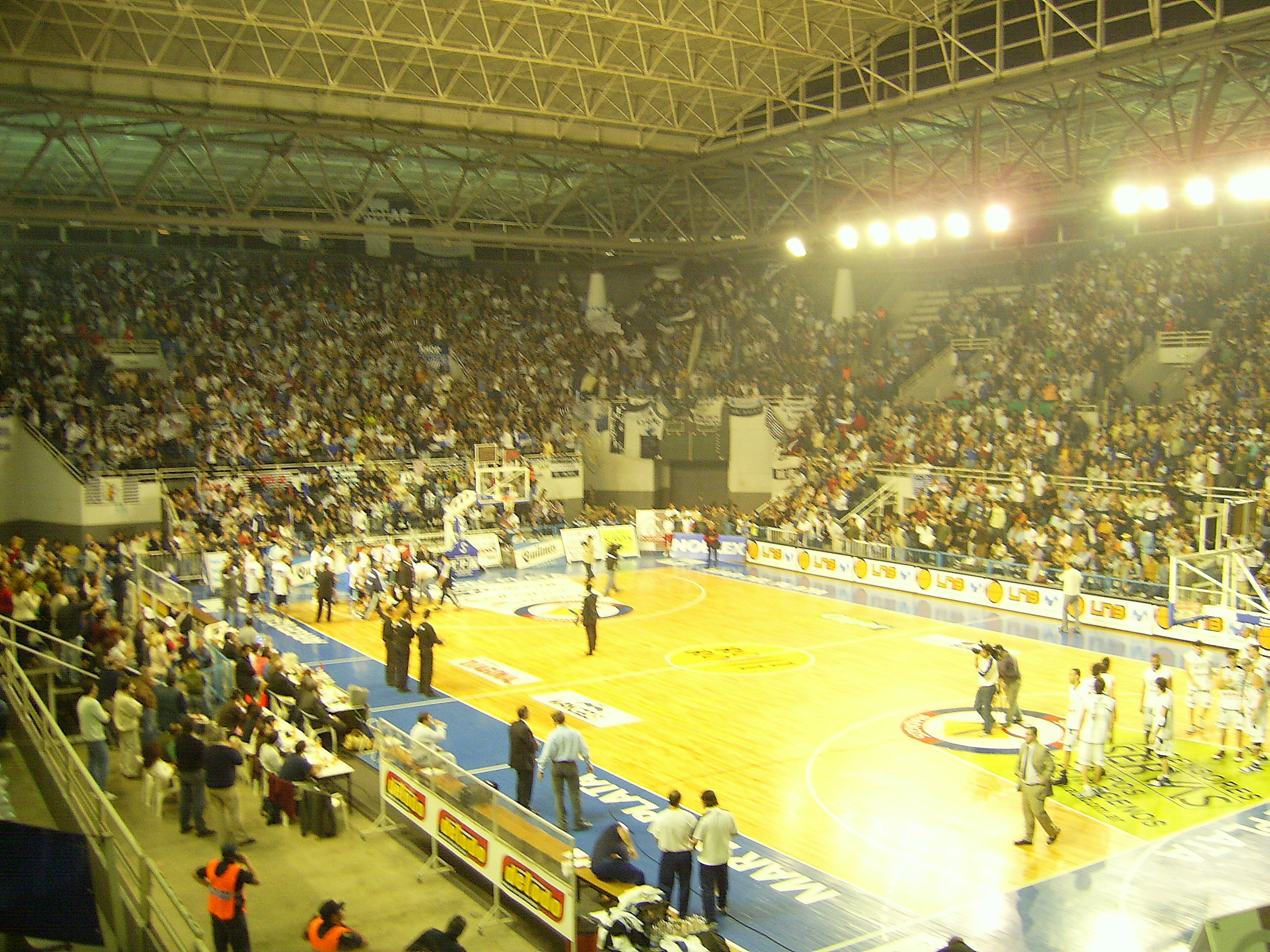
- The arena during a basketball game in 2007
- Interactive map of Islas Malvinas Sports Centre
- Location: Mar del Plata, Buenos Aires Province, Argentina
- Coordinates: 38°01′04″S 57°34′28″W
- Owner: General Pueyrredón Partido
- Capacity: Basketball: 7,666 (permanent seating); 8,000 (full capacity); Tennis: 9,800
- Type: Arena

Construction
- Opened: 1995; 31 years ago

Tenant
- Peñarol (basketball)

Website
- mardelplata.gob.ar/polideportivoemder

The Polideportivo Islas Malvinas is an indoor arena in Mar del Plata, Argentina, which was built for the XII Pan American Games in 1995. It hosts sports such as basketball, handball, volleyball and tennis, as well as shows, conventions and exhibitions. The arena is best known locally as the home venue of C.A. Peñarol's basketball team.

It belongs to the Teodoro Bronzini sports centre and is owned by the General Pueyrredón Partido.

The arena's name reflects Argentina's claims of sovereignty over the Falkland Islands (Islas Malvinas in Spanish).

== Facilities ==
The stadium is located in the Campo Municipal de Deportes of the city. It occupies an area of 1.3 hectares and has a sports area measuring 65 × 48 meters, with a 24 × 43-meter floating floor.

Provides a direct vehicular access to the center of the complex, allowing the convenience that emergency vehicles such as ambulances within reach in case of an emergency and also areas of storage, which allow easy entry of any element or equipment (such as: sound, lighting). Access to the public are 4 and access the pockets are 16 galleries, all with emergency exit systems, which provides maximum safety and flow for ingress and egress to the complex. All the infrastructure of health, gym locker rooms, food service and others, have special adaptations for disabled people. It is equipped with a heating and air renewal, four boards many changes, plus a network of 28 speakers. Until 2008 it had a video-wall, and was the only stadium in the country that has one, but the need to expand the number of seats for the performance of the Davis Cup had the video-wall removed to be replaced with more seats .

A major traffic area covered Edge is available to perform any kind of simultaneous events as gastronomy and wine tasting, exhibition and sale of products or others.

The stadium was originally allowed to accommodate 6,482 spectators. However, for the implementation of the 2008 Davis Cup, new seats were added. Currently, the stadium has 7,666 seats, although in peak condition (with spectators standing in doorways and sitting on the stairs) may have around 8,000 people. It also has VIP access to journalism, independent judges and players, conference room, shower facilities and complementary.

It is part of the "Teodoro Bronzini" Municipal Sports Park, a 35 hectares area with several sport venues, including the Estadio José María Minella, the Julio Polet Municipal Velodrome, the Pan American Field Hockey Stadium, the "Alberto Zorrilla" Natatorium, the "Justo Roman" Athletic stadium and the Patinódromo Municipal.

== History ==
Originally built for the XII Pan American Games in 1995, the Polideportivo Islas Malvinas became an important sports venue in the city. After the Pan American Games, it began to be used for a variety of sporting and other events.

In addition, it is used for stage shows, concerts and recitals in the summer, taking advantage of the high season for the city, where most shows Buenos Aires moved to Mar del Plata.

The stadium was chosen to host the 2008 Davis Cup final between Spain and Argentina, which was played from 21 to 23 November 2008. For this occasion, the capacity was extended to 9,800 spectators capacity to meet regulatory actions requiring the organization. However, after moving seats that were removed had been placed solely for the tournament, and the final capacity for all events is 7,666 spectators.

== Events held ==
=== Sports ===
- 1995 Pan American Games
- 1999 FIVB Volleyball World League Final Round
- 2002 FIVB Volleyball Men's World Championship
- 2003 Parapan American Games
- 2005 FIBA Under-21 World Championship
- 2006 South American Games
- 2007, 2009 and 2011 Super 8 Tournament
- 2008 Davis Cup Final
- 2009 World Senior ITF Championships
- 2009–10 FIBA Americas League Final Four
- FIBA Americas Championship 2011
- 2011 Men's Youth World Handball Championship
- 2013 FIVB Volleyball World League Final Round
- 2013 Pan American Men's Junior Handball Championship
- 2015 Summer Transplant Games

=== Concerts ===
- Luis Miguel December 5, 2010 (Luis Miguel Tour).
- Ricky Martin September 14, 2011 (Música + Alma + Sexo World Tour), March 25, 2016 (One World Tour).
- Calle 13 October 30, 2011 (Entren Los Que Quieran Tour).
- Roxette April 28, 2012 (Charm School World Tour)
- Lali Espósito (Soy Tour) October 8, 2016

Preceded by Memorial Coliseum; Portland, Oregon	Davis Cup; Final Venue; 2008	Succeeded by Palau Sant Jordi; Barcelona, Spain
Preceded by Roberto Clemente Coliseum; San Juan, Puerto Rico	FIBA Americas Championship; Final Venue; 2011	Succeeded by Poliedro de Caracas; Caracas, Venezuela
Preceded by Arena Armeec; Sofia	FIVB Volleyball World League; Final Venue; 2013	Succeeded by Nelson Mandela Forum; Florence
