= Arthur Patrianova =

Brazilian handball player (born 1993)

Personal information
- Full name: Arthur Malburg Patrianova
- Born: 22 April 1993 (age 33) Itajaí, Brazil
- Height: 1.91 m (6 ft 3 in)

Sport
- Sport: Handball
- Position: Left back

Senior clubs
- Years: Team
- 2013–2014: CB Ciudad de Logroño
- 2014–2015: CB Villa de Aranda
- 2015–2017: RK Celje
- 2017–2019: S.L. Benfica
- 2019–: Recoletas Atlético Valladolid
National team
Years	Team	Apps	(Gls)
–	Brazil	34	(71)
Medal record
South American Games
Gold medal – first place	2014 Chile	Team
Pan American Championship
Silver medal – second place	2014 Uruguay	Team
Pan American Youth Championship
Gold medal – first place	2010 Brazil	Team
Pan American Junior Championship
Gold medal – first place	2013 Argentina	Team

Arthur Malburg Patrianova (born 22 April 1993) is a Brazilian handball player who has played for the Brazil national team. He is a left back. He has played for clubs including Villa de Aranda in Spain and RK Celje in Slovenia.

== Honours ==
Benfica

- Portuguese Super Cup: 2018
