= Alstermo IF Fotboll =

Swedish football club

- Full name: Alstermo Idrottsförening Fotboll
- Founded: 1927; 98 years ago
- Ground: Amokabel arena Alstermo; Sweden
- Chairman: Lars-Gunnar Serell
- Coach: Peter Ivarsson; David Lidheim Åsenius
- League: Division 3 Sydöstra Götaland
- 2010: Division 4 Småland Elit Östra, 2nd (Promoted)
Home colours	Away colours

Alstermo IF Fotboll is a Swedish football team located in Alstermo in Uppvidinge Municipality, Kronoberg County. They are the football department of the sports club Alstermo IF.

== Background ==
Since their foundation Alstermo IF Fotboll has participated mainly in the middle and lower divisions of the Swedish football league system. The club currently plays in Division 3 Sydöstra Götaland which is the fifth tier of Swedish football. They play their home matches at the Amokabel arena in Alstermo.

Alstermo IF Fotboll are affiliated to Smålands Fotbollförbund.

== Recent history ==
In recent seasons Alstermo IF Fotboll have competed in the following divisions:

2011 – Division III, Sydöstra Götaland
2010 – Division IV, Småland Elit Östra
2009 – Division IV, Småland Sydöstra
2008 – Division V, Småland Östra
2007 – Division V, Småland Östra
2006 – Division V, Småland Östra
2005 – Division VI, Nybro
2004 – Division VI, Nybro
2003 – Division V, Småland Östra
2002 – Division V, Småland Östra
2001 – Division VI, Nybro
2000 – Division VI, Emådalen
1999 – Division V, Småland Östra

== Attendances ==
In recent seasons Alstermo IF Fotboll have had the following average attendances:

Season	Average attendance	Division / Section	Level
2009	Not available	Div 4 Småland Sydöstra	Tier 7
2010	114	Div 4 Småland Elit Östra	Tier 6

* Attendances are provided in the Publikliga sections of the Svenska Fotbollförbundet website.
