= Amo Handboll =

Swedish handball club

- Full name: Alstermo Idrottsförening Handboll
- Short name: AIF
- Founded: 1971
- Arena: Amokabelhallen
- Capacity: 700
- President: Henrik Blad
- Head coach: Hasse Karlsson
- League: Handbollsligan
- 2024-25: 12th
- Club colours
Home	Away

Amo Handboll are a professional handball team based in Alstermo, Sweden. They are the handball department of the sports club Alstermo IF. The department was formed in 1971 with the help of Allan Myhrberg, Lars-Gunnar Serell, Lars Åberg, Reine Blad och Åke Erlandsson.

Amo Handboll currently plays in Handbollsligan, the highest-level Swedish team handball league, after being promoted in the 2023-24 season. Amo Handboll's biggest merit so far is a playoff to Elitserien 2004. After the 2016/2017 season, the handball division broke up with Alstermo IF, and changed name from Alstermo IF Handboll to Amo Handboll.

Location of Amo Handboll

== Naming history ==
Name	Period
Alstermo IF Handboll	1971-2017
Amo Handboll	2017–present

== Team ==
=== Current squad ===
Squad for the 2025–26 season

Goalkeepers

- (Germany) Phil Döhler
- (Sweden) Josip Cavar

Left Wingers

- (Sweden) Oscar Ader

Right Wingers
Line players

- (Sweden) Jesper Jensen

Left Backs

- (Norway) Jørg William Fiala Gjermundnes

Central Backs
Right Backs

=== Transfers ===
Transfers for the 2026–27 season

Joining

- (Sweden) Richard Lindström (RB) from (Italy) Pallamano Trieste
- (Germany) Phil Döhler (GK) from (Norway) Runar Sandefjord

Leaving

=== Transfer History ===
Transfers for the 2025–26 season

Joining

- (Norway) Jørg William Fiala Gjermundnes (LB) from (Norway) ØIF Arendal
- (Sweden) Josip Cavar (GK) from (Denmark) KIF Kolding
- (Sweden) Jesper Jensen (LP) from (Sweden) IFK Skövde
- (Sweden) Oscar Ader (LW) from (Sweden) IF Hallby

Leaving

- (Norway) Thomas Langerud (GK) to (Norway) Kristiansand Topphåndball
- (Sweden) Erik Östling (LP) to (Italy) Cassano Magnago HC
- (Sweden) Elias Lundstad (RB) to (Sweden) Skånela IF
- (Sweden) Anders Forsell Schefvert (CB) to (Sweden) OV Helsingborg HK
