= Norrhult-Klavreström =

- Location within Kronoberg Location within Sweden
- Coordinates: 57°08′N 15°10′E
- Country: Sweden
- Province: Småland
- County: Kronoberg County
- Municipality: Uppvidinge Municipality and Växjö Municipality

Area
  - Total: 2.80 km^{2} (1.08 sq mi)

Population (31 December 2010)
  - Total: 1,215
  - Density: 434/km^{2} (1,120/sq mi)
- Time zone: UTC+1 (CET)
  - Summer (DST): UTC+2 (CEST)

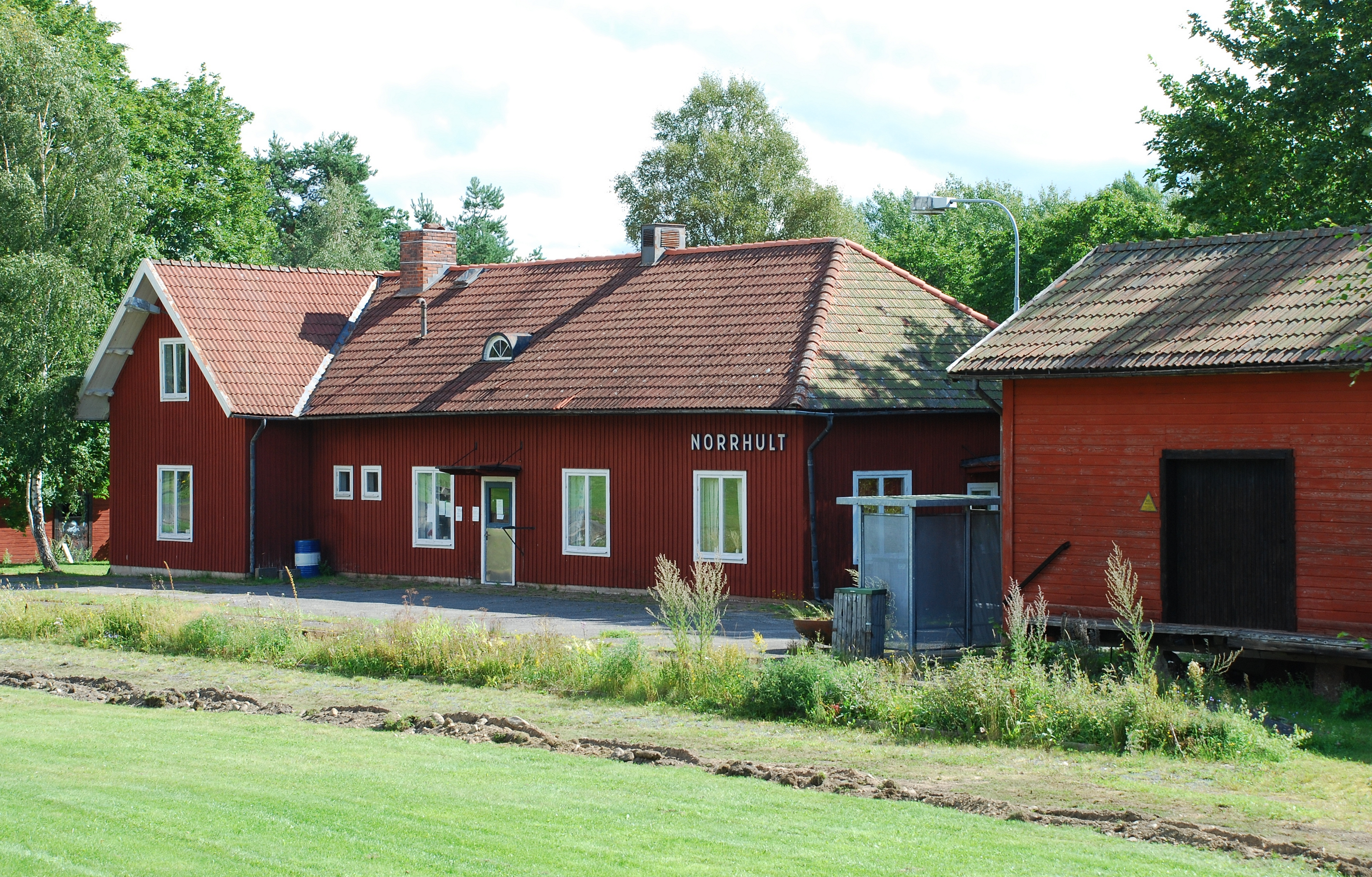
Norrhult, former train station

Norrhult-Klavreström is a bimunicipal locality situated in Uppvidinge Municipality in Kronoberg County, Sweden with 1,215 inhabitants in 2010.
