= Daniel Pettersson (handballer) =

Swedish handball player (born 1992)

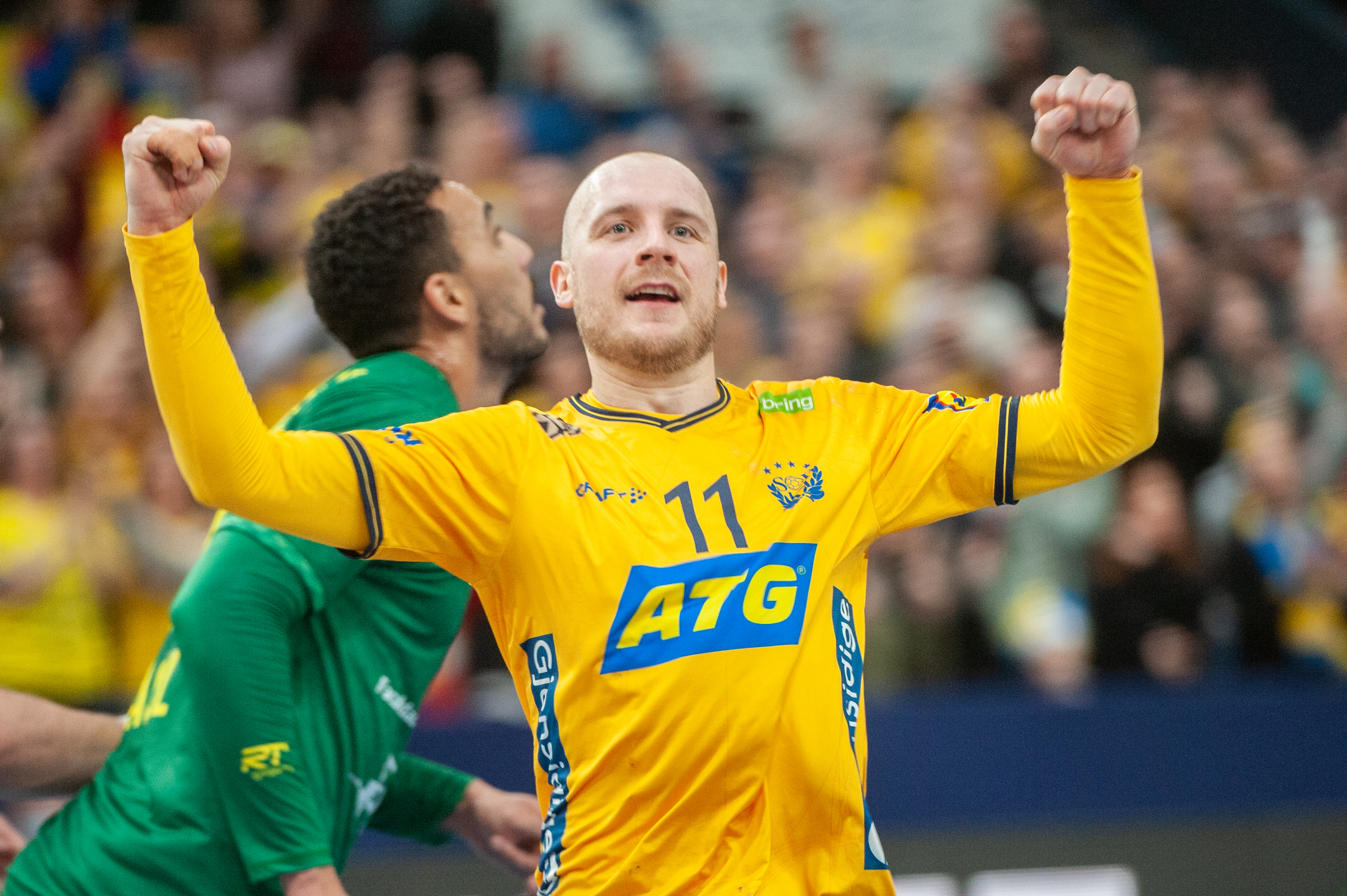

Personal information
- Nationality: Swedish
- Born: 6 May 1992 (age 34) Eskilstuna, Sweden
- Height: 1.79 m (5 ft 10 in)

Sport
- Sport: Handball
- Position: Right wing
- Current club: SC Magdeburg
- Number: 11

Youth career
- Years: Team
- 2001-2011: Eskilstuna Guif

Senior clubs
- Years: Team
- 2011–2016: Eskilstuna Guif
- 2016–: SC Magdeburg
National team
| Years | Team | Apps | (Gls) |
| 2014– | Sweden | 99 | (225) |
Medal record
World Championship
| Silver medal – second place | 2021 Egypt |
European Championship
| Gold medal – first place | 2022 Hungary/Slovakia |
| Bronze medal – third place | 2024 Germany |
Junior World Championship
| Gold medal – first place | 2013 Bosnia and Herzegovina |
- Updated on 14 January 2026

Daniel Pettersson (born 6 May 1992) is a Swedish handball player for SC Magdeburg and the Swedish national team.

== Career ==
Pettersson joined Eskilstuna Guif in 2001. In 2011 he made his senior debut for the club. The same season he finished 2nd with the club.

In 2016 he joined the Bundesliga team SC Magdeburg. Here he won the 2021 EHF European League and IHF Super Globe. In 2022 he won the German Championship and the Super Globe for a second time. In 2023 he won the EHF Champions League and the Super Globe for a third time. In 2024 he won the DHB-Pokal and German Championship. He won the EHF Champions League for a second time in 2024-25.

=== National team ===
In 2010 he played at the European Youth Championship and in 2013 he won the U-21 World Championship. At the 2010 he was selected for the tournament all-star team.

Pettersson made his international debut on the Swedish national team in March 2014, against Germany.

He participated at the 2020 European Men's Handball Championship in Sweden. He also participated in bringing home the silver medal for Sweden in the 2021 World Men's Handball Championship, and gold medal in the 2022 European Men's Handball Championship.

At the 2021 World Men's Handball Championship he won silver medals with Sweden, losing to Denmark in the final. He also represented Sweden at the 2021 Olympics.

At the 2022 European Men's Handball Championship he won gold medals with Sweden. During the tournament he tested positive for COVID-19 and was thus replaced by Valter Chrintz. By the semi-final he returned to the team.

At the 2024 European Men's Handball Championship he won bronze medals.

During the 2024 Olympics he was injured in the preliminary rounds in a match against Slovenia, which ended his tournament.

== Honours ==
- EHF Champions League:
  - Gold: 2023, 2025
- EHF European League:
  - Gold: 2021
  - Silver: 2022
  - Bronze: 2017, 2018
- IHF Super Globe:
  - Gold: 2021, 2022, 2023
- Handball-Bundesliga:
  - Gold: 2022, 2024
- DHB-Pokal:
  - Gold: 2024
  - Silver: 2019, 2022, 2023
