= Lenhovda =

- Location within Kronoberg Location within Sweden
- Coordinates: 57°0′N 15°17′E
- Country: Sweden
- Province: Småland
- County: Kronoberg County
- Municipality: Uppvidinge Municipality

Area
  - Total: 2.33 km^{2} (0.90 sq mi)

Population (31 December 2010)
  - Total: 1,744
  - Density: 749/km^{2} (1,940/sq mi)
- Time zone: UTC+1 (CET)
  - Summer (DST): UTC+2 (CEST)

Lenhovda (Swedish pronunciation: [ˈlêːnˌhɔvda]) is a locality situated in Uppvidinge Municipality, Kronoberg County, Sweden with 1,744 inhabitants in 2010.
