= Leonardo Santos (handballer) =

Brazilian handball player (born 1994)

Personal information
- Full name: Leonardo Felipe Sampaio Santos
- Born: 30 May 1994 (age 32) Maringá, Brazil
- Height: 1.94 m (6 ft 4 in)

Sport
- Sport: Handball
- Position: Left back
National team
Years	Team	Apps	(Gls)
–	Brazil	21	(38)
Medal record
Pan American Championship
Gold medal – first place	2016 Argentina
Pan American Junior Championship
Gold medal – first place	2015 Brazil

Leonardo Felipe Sampaio Santos (born 30 May 1994) is a Brazilian handball player for the Brazilian handball team.

He participated at the 2016 Summer Olympics in Rio de Janeiro, in the men's handball tournament.
