= Teodoro Bronzini =

Argentine politician (1888–1981)

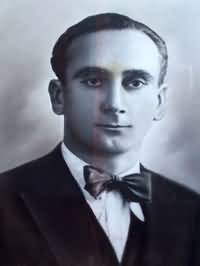
The young Teodoro Bronzini

Teodoro Bronzini (October 10, 1888 – August 20, 1981) was an Argentine politician, affiliated with the Socialist Party, who served as Mayor of Mar del Plata for four periods, from the 1920s to the 1960s. He developed a public and private career for more than 60 years.

== Early life and career ==
He was born on 10 October 1888, in the neighborhood of La Boca, Buenos Aires. His parents were Italian immigrants from the town of Porto Recanati (at that time hamlet of Recanati), in the Italian region of Marche, on the Adriatic Sea coast. His father was Juan Bronzini, a boat skipper in Italy, and in Argentina worked in the fishing industry, first in the Rio de la Plata and soon in the city of Mar del Plata, where he and his family settled in 1892. Her mother was Luisa Giorgetti. At the age of eight he worked in one of the old resorts on Bristol beach. Soon after, he became the newsboy at Bristol Hotel. Once he completed his basic instruction, he graduated as bookkeeper, which prepared him to work for retailers, and to teach accountancy and mathematics at a later period of his life. From 1937 he became involved in insurance business, which would be his main private activity for the rest of his life along with press activities.

== Affiliation with the Socialist Party ==
Bronzini joined the Socialist Party in April 1915 and on 7 December he founded the weekly magazine El Trabajo ("The Work"), becoming its first director. From 1920 until its demise in 1974, this was the main Socialist newspaper in Buenos Aires Province. Bronzini and other columnists developed a permanent struggle for the Socialist principles of social justice and democracy, with a big compromise towards the public liberties, favouring a suitable and honest handling of the public interests under the scope of the State, and fighting without concessions the advances of the central governments over the municipal autonomy.

In 1917 he acceded for the first time to the Deliberative Council in representation of the Socialist Party, being reelected for 1918/19. The electoral success of November 1919 allowed the revolutionary fact of consecrating Bronzini as Socialist Mayor in a city like Mar del Plata, a safe haven for the summer-visiting Argentine upper class and its local sympathizers. He is thus considered one of the first socialist Mayors of the Americas. That first period (1920–21) was briefly interrupted by an arbitrary intervention of the provincial government, who had to restore him in office by judicial ruling. For the period 1922–23, Socialist councilman Rufino Inda was elected Mayor. Bronzini returned to office for the period 1924–25, as councilman in 1926–27, and again as Mayor for 1928–29. This period was also interrupted by another illegal intervention in September 1929, just 60 days after his electoral success, in order to prevent a new socialist mandate. A strong evidence of the effective task made by the Socialist administrations during the 20s are the successive electoral victories the party won with a percentage surpassing the 50%, all that in coexistence with politically adverse provincial and national governments. Bronzini was also nominated provincial commissioner for the period 1921–22, 1925–28 and 1930 until the military coup of 6 September 1930. It is possible to argue that the double provincial and local charges intended to offer legislative immunity as a protection to the municipal autonomy.

=== Masonry membership ===
By the same time, he was president of the masonic lodge Liga Masónica 9 de Julio de 1891, which still exists in Mar del Plata. Since 1939 he strongly vowed for secularism in the society, in accordance with "the liberal traditions of Argentina". The lodge published a tribute to Bronzini shortly after his death.

== The 'patriotic fraud' period ==
While the military government of General José Félix Uriburu pretended to restore democracy by calling elections in 1931, the popular vote was actually outmaneuvered in several provinces by electoral fraud, especially in Buenos Aires, where the fraud reached scandalous levels. In Mar del Plata, during the first municipal election of the 1930s, and despite the blatant fraud, there was socialist representation in the Deliberative Council, integrated among others by Bronzini, who was characterized by a spirited defense of the popular interests. His support for the Cooperative of Electricity and the denunciation of the scandalous contract with the Compania Argentina de Electricidad (CADE) made headlines on those years, at the same time that in Buenos Aires the famous issue of the CHADE. During that time, known in Argentina as the década infame, electoral fraud and gerrymandering prevented Socialism to gain seats in the local Council and elsewhere. Bronzini eventually won a seat in the provincial house of representatives for the period 1933–36, where he specially wows, through the budgetary debates, for a rigorous accountability of the public funds and denounced in detail the conservative government vices and abuses, prompting a severe control of the public deficit. In 1934 he was a member of the convention for the reform of the provincial constitution.

== Peronism and beyond ==
The conservative regime fell as a consequence of the June 4th Revolution of 1943, followed by a military government and then by Perón's presidency. Bronzini returned to the Legislature for the periods 1948–51 and 1952–55 until the military coup of September 16, 1955. This legislative period saw him as a strong upholder of the freedom of speech and the financial accountability of the public spending. In 1957 Bronzini was elected representative for the convention of Santa Fe who reformed the National Constitution, which prevailed until the 1994 reform.

In 1958 there were new elections for Mayor, this time for a four-year period. In 1962, when president Arturo Frondizi nullified the elections of March that year, the resulting provincial government extended the mandates of a number of council governments, among them Mar del Plata district; as result, Bronzini continued to be mayor until April 1963. After the renewal of the constitutional authorities in October 1963, Bronzini was elected Provincial Senator, remaining in office until the military coup of 28 July 1966. During this mandate, which was the last public position exerted by Bronzini, he played a key role in the amendment of the statutory law of the Bank of the Province of Buenos Aires. To his proposal, the bank had to grant loans to the townships proportionally to the taxes that those had to pay to the province. He died on 20 August 1981, in Mar del Plata.
