= Uppvidinge Municipality =

Uppvidinge Municipality Uppvidinge kommun
- Municipality
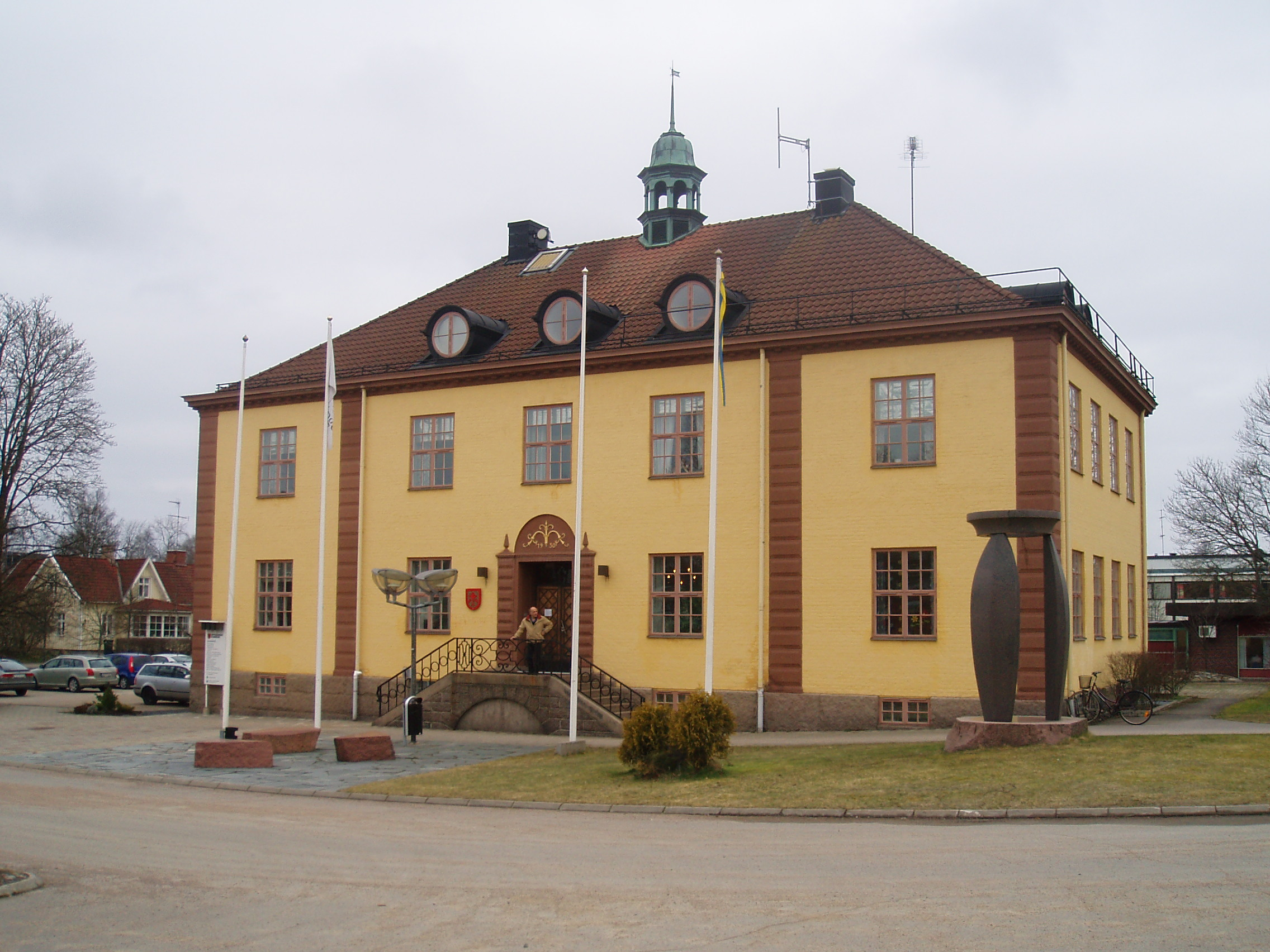
- Uppvindinge town hall

- Coat of arms

- Coordinates: 57°10′N 15°20′E
- Country: Sweden
- County: Kronoberg County
- Seat: Åseda

Area
  - Total: 1,226.66 km^{2} (473.62 sq mi)
  - Land: 1,171.88 km^{2} (452.47 sq mi)
  - Water: 54.78 km^{2} (21.15 sq mi)
- Area as of 1 January 2014.

Population (30 June 2025)
  - Total: 9,025
  - Density: 7.701/km^{2} (19.95/sq mi)
- Time zone: UTC+1 (CET)
  - Summer (DST): UTC+2 (CEST)
- ISO 3166 code: SE
- Province: Småland
- Municipal code: 0760
- Website: www.uppvidinge.se

Uppvidinge Municipality (Swedish: Uppvidinge kommun) is a municipality in Kronoberg County, southern Sweden, with its seat in the town of Åseda.

The present municipality, which took its name from a hundred, was formed by the local government reform of 1971 when Lenhovda, Nottebäck, Åseda and Älghult were amalgamated. The number of original entities, as of 1863, is six. The first amalgamation in the area (Granhult merged with Nottebäck) took place already in 1915.

The municipality has a rather small population but its slogan states "In a Small Municipality Man Becomes Large".

More than 80% of the area is covered with forests, making it live up to the general public's impression of the "dark" province of Småland. The name Uppvidinge itself means something like forest on a hill. The coat of arms is based on the insignia of Uppvidinge Hundred, from a document from 1568. It depicts a herb of unknown species in a red color.

== Localities ==
There are 5 urban areas (also called a Tätort or locality) in Uppvidinge Municipality.

In the table the localities are listed according to the size of the population as of December 31, 2005. The municipal seat is in bold characters.

#	Locality	Population
1	**Åseda**	2,430
2	Lenhovda	1,714
3	Norrhult-Klavreström	1,269
4	Alstermo	859
5	Älghult	481

== Demographics ==
This is a demographic table based on Uppvidinge Municipality's electoral districts in the 2022 Swedish general election sourced from SVT's election platform, in turn taken from SCB official statistics.

In total there were 9,423 residents, including 6,679 Swedish citizens of voting age. 40.4% voted for the left coalition and 58.1% for the right coalition. Indicators are in percentage points except population totals and income.

Location	Residents	Citizen adults	Left vote	Right vote	Employed	Swedish parents	Foreign heritage	Income SEK	Degree
Location			%	%					
Lenhovda	2,309	1,737	40.0	58.9	82	76	24	25,509	22
Nottebäck	1,739	1,253	43.5	55.5	79	77	23	24,445	26
Åseda N	1,853	1,303	38.1	60.4	81	70	30	24,146	24
Åseda S	1,499	992	36.0	61.5	75	70	30	24,374	28
Älghult	2,023	1,394	41.9	56.7	76	71	29	21,680	25
Source: SVT
