= Arena Zenica =

Indoor sports venue in Bosnia and Herzegovina

Zenica Arena
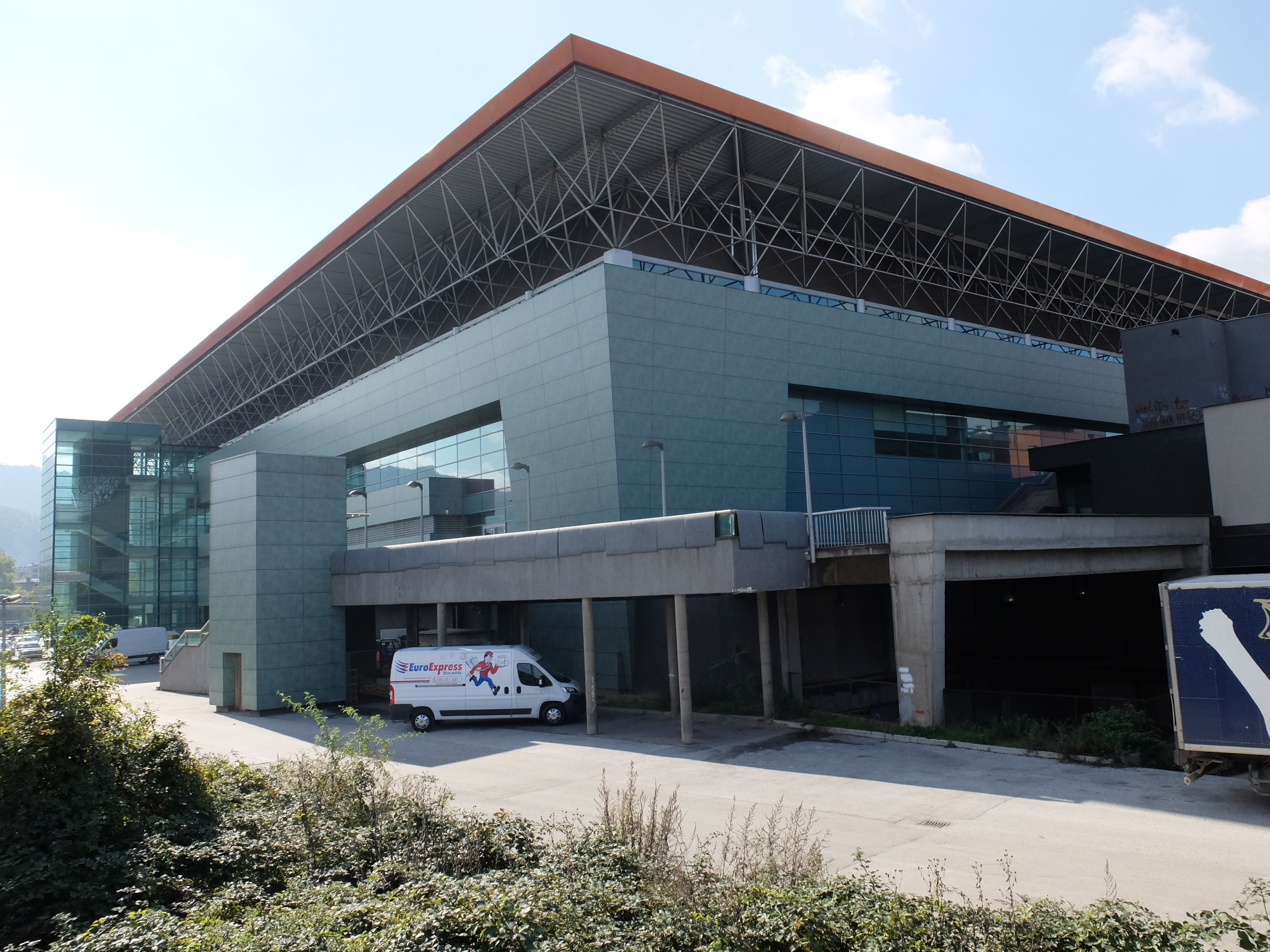
- Interactive map of Zenica Arena
- Full name: City Arena "Husejin Smajlović" before May 25, 2017: City Arena Zenica
- Location: Zenica, Bosnia and Herzegovina
- Coordinates: 44°12′08″N 17°54′49″E
- Owner: City of Zenica
- Operator: JP "Za upravljanje i održavanje sportskih objekata" Zenica
- Capacity: 6,200 (10,000 for concerts)
- Surface: versatile

Construction
- Groundbreaking: February 2007
- Built: 2009
- Opened: March 20, 2009
- Cost: €16 million

Tenants
- Bosnia and Herzegovina basketball team Bosnia and Herzegovina handball team Bosnia and Herzegovina Davis Cup team

Website
- arenazenica.com

Arena "Husejin Smajlović" (before: Arena Zenica) is a multifunctional indoor sports venue located in Zenica, Bosnia and Herzegovina.

== History ==
=== Construction ===
The construction began in February 2007 and was completed on March 20, 2009. Total construction costs are estimated to be around 32 million convertible marks (€16 million) provided from the Zenica municipality budget.

=== Name change ===
In May 2017, local authorities outvoted to rename the arena from "City Arena Zenica" to the "City Arena Husejin Smajlović", eponymous after former longtime (2004–2016) Mayor Husejin Smajlović. The decision made was controversial for a number of reasons, the most significant being the object is of secular purpose (including musical manifestations, alcohol, etc.) and Smajlovic was Muslim; new name has not got established yet, musicians continue to state that they perform at the Arena Zenica for managerial reasons of name simplicity and neutrality, and it is still mentioned by most citizens in free speech as the Zenica Arena (or Arena only).

== Capacity ==
The total seating capacity of Arena Zenica is 6,200 for basketball or handball matches, and it can be increased up to 10,000 for concert events.

== Tenants ==
Arena is the new homeground for Bosnia and Herzegovina basketball and handball national teams.

== Activities ==
=== Notable concerts ===
- Amar Jašarspahić – Gile held a concert on 21. December 2013.
- Miligram (band) performed a sold out concert, promoting their Ludi petak album on 8. November 2014.
- Šaban Šaulić performed a concert on 8. April 2015.
- Seka Aleksić performed a sold-out show promoting her album Lek za spavanje on 19. September 2015.
- Lepa Brena performed a sold-out show as part of her Začarani krug Tour on 18. November 2015.

=== 2013 Men's Junior World Handball Championship ===
Arena Zenica has been the host to teams in Group D playing at the 2013 Men's Junior World Handball Championship, which was held in Bosnia and Herzegovina from July 14 to July 28, 2013.

== See also ==
- Sport in Bosnia and Herzegovina
- List of indoor arenas in Bosnia and Herzegovina
