= Bjarke Christensen =

Danish handball player (born 1992)

Personal information
- Full name: Bjarke Christensen
- Nationality: Danish
- Born: 26 January 1992 (age 34) Skjern, Denmark
- Height: 1.86 m (6 ft 1 in)

Sport
- Sport: Handball
- Position: Left wing
- Current club: Skjern Håndbold
- Number: 19

Senior clubs
- Years: Team
- 2011–2020: Skjern Håndbold
- 2020–2022: Mors-Thy Håndbold
- 2022–2024: KIF Kolding
- 2024–: Skjern Håndbold
National team
Years	Team	Apps	(Gls)
2022–	Denmark	3	(6)

Bjarke Christensen (born 26 January 1992) is a Danish handball player for Skjern and the Danish national team.

He made his debut on the Danish national team on 17 March 2022, against Norway at the 2021-22 Golden League Tournament in Aalborg.

On 20 June 2021, it was announced that Christensen had signed a 3-year contract with KIF Kolding beginning from the summer of 2022. From the summer of 2024 he has a contract with Skjern Håndbold. In the 2022-23 season he scored the second most goals in the Danish league with 201 goals. Only Emil Madsens 252 goals surpassed him. In the 2021-22 season he had the third most goals with 210.

== Achievements ==
- Danish Handball League:
  - Winner: 2018
  - Silver: 2015, 2017
  - Bronze: 2013, 2019
- Danish Handball Cup:
  - Winner: 2014, 2016 2021
  - Silver: 2012
- EHF Cup:
  - Bronze: 2015

Individual awards

- All-Star team as Best left wing Danish League 2022/23
