= Alsterån =

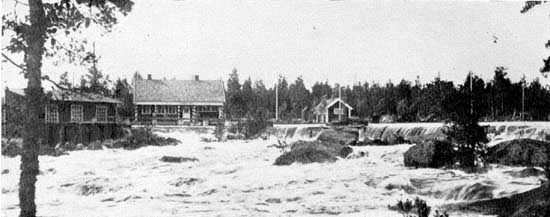
- Alsterån in year 1925

- Location of the mouth in Sweden

Location
- Country: Sweden

Physical characteristics
- Source: Alstern
  - coordinates: 56°59′50″N 15°24′42″E
  - elevation: 219 m (719 ft)
- Mouth: Kalmar Strait, Baltic Sea
  - location: Pataholm
  - coordinates: 56°55′15″N 16°26′08″E
  - elevation: 0 m (0 ft)
- Length: 100 km (62 mi)
- Basin size: 1,524.8 km^{2} (588.7 sq mi)
- Discharge
  - average: 10 m^{3}/s (350 cu ft/s)

Alsterån is a river in Sweden.
