= Alstermo =

- Location within Kronoberg Location within Sweden
- Coordinates: 56°58′N 15°39′E
- Country: Sweden
- Province: Småland
- County: Kronoberg County
- Municipality: Uppvidinge Municipality

Area
  - Total: 1.56 km^{2} (0.60 sq mi)

Population (31 December 2010)
  - Total: 829
  - Density: 531/km^{2} (1,380/sq mi)
- Time zone: UTC+1 (CET)
  - Summer (DST): UTC+2 (CEST)

Alstermo is a locality situated in Uppvidinge Municipality, Kronoberg County, Sweden with 829 inhabitants in 2010.

== Overview ==
Alstermo is situated along Alsterån in the deep forests of Uppvidinge. Local government in the province Småland, belonging to Kronoberg County, with Växjö as capital city.

Alstermo is about 40 km from Nybro, 65 km from Växjö, Kalmar and Oskarshamn.

People of the town like to use Alsterån for swimming, boating, and other recreation. Other popular activities are walking, riding, going by bicycle, and picking berries and mushrooms in the forest.

Alstermo also has tennis courts, a football stadium, a sports hall and a shooting-range. In the winter, skiing and skating are very popular. Elk, deer, fox, badger, marten, mink, and a host of other animals live in the dark woods surrounding Alstermo. It is also common to see cranes, herons, hawks, and buzzards. Fish such as pike, perch, roach, and burbot are prevalent in the Alsterån waters.

Alstermo has a doctor, a dentist, a post office, a bank, various stores, a youth hostel, restaurants, a library, a cinema and a recreation park. A bus company also serves the community.

== People ==
Alstermo is the birthplace of the Swedish actress Siw Carlsson and Ulrika Bjorsne, a member of The Shortwave Set.

== Sport ==
Today Alstermo is most famous for their handball team Alstermo IF. Alstermo IF have been playing in one of the top leagues in the Swedish league pyramid in handball for almost a decade while their football team have been promoted Division 3 Sydöstra Götaland.
