= Francisco Salazar =

Chilean handball player (born 1992)

Personal information
- Full name: Francisco Javier Salazar Medrano
- Born: 4 August 1992 (age 34) Cañete, Chile
- Height: 1.78 m (5 ft 10 in)

Sport
- Sport: Handball
- Position: Right wing

Senior clubs
- Years: Team
- 2010–2014: Santiago Steels
- 2014: Octavio Pilotes Posada
- 2014–2017: Santiago Steels
- 2017–2021: CB Ovalle
National team
Years	Team	Apps	(Gls)
–	Chile	14	(25)

Francisco Javier Salazar Medrano (born 4 August 1992) is a Chilean handball player for the Chile national team.
