= Diego Reyes (handballer) =

Chilean handball player (born 1992)

Personal information
- Full name: Diego Cristián Reyes Figueroa
- Born: 24 July 1992 (age 34) Valparaíso, Chile
- Height: 1.85 m (6 ft 1 in)

Sport
- Sport: Handball
- Position: Left back

Senior clubs
- Years: Team
- 2010–2012: Club Winterhill
- 2012–2013: Santiago Wanderers
- 2013–2016: BM Zamora
- 2016–2017: BM Alarcos
- 2017–2018: CB San José Obrero
- 2018–2020: ARS Palma del Río
- 2020–2021: BM Los Dólmenes
National team
Years	Team	Apps	(Gls)
–	Chile	42	(46)
Medal record
Pan American Games
Silver medal – second place	2019 Lima	Team
Bronze medal – third place	2015 Toronto	Team
Pan American Championship
Silver medal – second place	2016 Argentina
Bronze medal – third place	2018 Greenland

Diego Cristián Reyes Figueroa (born 24 July 1992) is a Chilean former handball player who played for the Chilean national team.
