= Alstermo IF =

Swedish sports club

Alstermo IF logo

Alstermo Idrottsförening is a sports club from Alstermo (in Kronoberg County), Sweden that was founded on 22 August 1927. The club currently specialises in football, handball, gymnastics, orienteering, skiing, cross-country skiing and roller skiing. The club has seen the greatest success in handball. Other sports that have been active within the club at various times include bandy, table tennis, cycling, athletics, ice hockey, swimming, tennis, Weightlifting and volleyball.

== Departments ==
- Alstermo IF Handboll – handball department.
- Alstermo IF Fotboll – football department.
- Alstermo IF Skidor – skiing department.
- Alstermo IF Gymnastik – gymnastics department.
- Alstermo IF Orientering – orienteering department.
