= 2011 Men's Youth World Handball Championship =

Tournament details
- Host country: Argentina
- Venue(s): 2 (in 1 host city)
- Dates: August 10–20
- Teams: 20 (from 5 confederations)

Final positions
- Champions: Denmark (2nd title)
- Runner-up: Spain
- Third place: Sweden
- Fourth place: France

Tournament statistics
- Matches played: 64
- Goals scored: 3,577 (55.89 per match)
- Attendance: 47,675 (745 per match)
- Top scorer(s): (Sweden) Jim Gottfridsson (58 goals)

Awards
- Best player: (Sweden) Jim Gottfridsson

The 2011 Men's Youth World Handball Championship was the fourth edition of the world event for youth handballers, which was held in Argentina between August 10–20, 2011. In accordance with the IHF regulations, only players born on or after 1 January 1992 were eligible to enter the competition. The minimum age for the participation was 16.

Denmark defeated Spain 24–22 in the final to win the title for the second time.

== Venues ==
Two arenas were used, both in Mar del Plata.

- Polideportivo Islas Malvinas (Capacity: 8,000)
- Once Unidos (Capacity: 1,500)

== Preliminary round ==
The draw took place at May 21, 2011 in Argentina.

All times are Argentina Time (UTC–3)

Team advanced to the Quarterfinals
Team competed in placement games

=== Group A ===
Team	Pld	W	D	L	GF	GA	GD	Pts
Sweden	4	2	2	0	116	111	+5	6
Croatia	4	2	1	1	105	97	+8	5
Slovenia	4	1	2	1	114	107	+7	4
Serbia	4	1	2	1	107	100	+7	4
Bahrain	4	0	1	3	94	121	−27	1

10 August 2011; 19:00	Serbia	27 – 27	Slovenia	Once Unidos, Mar del Plata; Attendance: 225; Referees: Santos, Fonseca (POR)
10 August 2011; 19:00	Pavić 12	(11–13)	Šoštarić 7	Once Unidos, Mar del Plata; Attendance: 225; Referees: Santos, Fonseca (POR)
10 August 2011; 19:00	2× (yellow card) 7× (suspension)	Report	11× (yellow card) 3× (suspension) 1× (red card)	Once Unidos, Mar del Plata; Attendance: 225; Referees: Santos, Fonseca (POR)

10 August 2011; 21:00	Sweden	27 – 27	Bahrain	Polideportivo Islas Malvinas, Mar del Plata; Attendance: 100; Referees: Paz, Sousa (BRA)
10 August 2011; 21:00	Gottfridsson 9	(15–13)	Habib, Saleh 6	Polideportivo Islas Malvinas, Mar del Plata; Attendance: 100; Referees: Paz, Sousa (BRA)
10 August 2011; 21:00	1× (yellow card) 4× (suspension)	Report	3× (yellow card) 4× (suspension) 1× (red card)	Polideportivo Islas Malvinas, Mar del Plata; Attendance: 100; Referees: Paz, Sousa (BRA)

11 August 2011; 18:30	Croatia	26 – 24	Slovenia	Polideportivo Islas Malvinas, Mar del Plata; Referees: Al-Suwaidi, Bamatraf (QAT)
11 August 2011; 18:30	Kaleb 9	(12–10)	Šoštarić 9	Polideportivo Islas Malvinas, Mar del Plata; Referees: Al-Suwaidi, Bamatraf (QAT)
11 August 2011; 18:30	2× (yellow card) 2× (suspension)	Report	3× (yellow card) 3× (suspension)	Polideportivo Islas Malvinas, Mar del Plata; Referees: Al-Suwaidi, Bamatraf (QAT)

11 August 2011; 20:30	Bahrain	21 – 29	Serbia	Polideportivo Islas Malvinas, Mar del Plata; Referees: El Sayed, Zidan (EGY)
11 August 2011; 20:30	Saleh 6	(11–11)	Pavić 9	Polideportivo Islas Malvinas, Mar del Plata; Referees: El Sayed, Zidan (EGY)
11 August 2011; 20:30	3× (yellow card) 9× (suspension) 1× (red card)	Report	3× (yellow card) 4× (suspension)	Polideportivo Islas Malvinas, Mar del Plata; Referees: El Sayed, Zidan (EGY)

12 August 2011; 17:00	Sweden	29 – 25	Croatia	Polideportivo Islas Malvinas, Mar del Plata; Attendance: 1,000; Referees: Schaller, Wutzler (GER)
12 August 2011; 17:00	Persson 7	(17–12)	Kaleb 11	Polideportivo Islas Malvinas, Mar del Plata; Attendance: 1,000; Referees: Schaller, Wutzler (GER)
12 August 2011; 17:00	2× (yellow card) 3× (suspension)	Report	2× (suspension)	Polideportivo Islas Malvinas, Mar del Plata; Attendance: 1,000; Referees: Schaller, Wutzler (GER)

13 August 2011; 16:30	Serbia	29 – 30	Sweden	Once Unidos, Mar del Plata; Attendance: 200; Referees: Eliasson, Gudjonsson (ISL)
13 August 2011; 16:30	Vučićević 9	(14–17)	Gottfridsson 12	Once Unidos, Mar del Plata; Attendance: 200; Referees: Eliasson, Gudjonsson (ISL)
13 August 2011; 16:30	2× (yellow card) 4× (suspension) 1× (red card)	Report	3× (yellow card) 3× (suspension)	Once Unidos, Mar del Plata; Attendance: 200; Referees: Eliasson, Gudjonsson (ISL)

13 August 2011; 17:00	Slovenia	33 – 24	Bahrain	Polideportivo Islas Malvinas, Mar del Plata; Referees: Erdoğan, Özdeniz (TUR)
13 August 2011; 17:00	Sostaric 11	(18–11)	Saleh 8	Polideportivo Islas Malvinas, Mar del Plata; Referees: Erdoğan, Özdeniz (TUR)
13 August 2011; 17:00	6× (yellow card) 2× (suspension)	Report	5× (yellow card) 2× (suspension)	Polideportivo Islas Malvinas, Mar del Plata; Referees: Erdoğan, Özdeniz (TUR)

14 August 2011; 19:00	Bahrain	22 – 32	Croatia	Polideportivo Islas Malvinas, Mar del Plata; Attendance: 250; Referees: Gonzales, Prieto (URU)
14 August 2011; 19:00	Ali 7	(10–12)	Sebetic 9	Polideportivo Islas Malvinas, Mar del Plata; Attendance: 250; Referees: Gonzales, Prieto (URU)
14 August 2011; 19:00	2× (yellow card) 2× (suspension)	Report	3× (yellow card) 3× (suspension)	Polideportivo Islas Malvinas, Mar del Plata; Attendance: 250; Referees: Gonzales, Prieto (URU)

15 August 2011; 14:00	Croatia	22 – 22	Serbia	Polideportivo Islas Malvinas, Mar del Plata; Attendance: 500; Referees: Schaller, Wutzler (GER)
15 August 2011; 14:00	Mandalinic 8	(11–10)	Mladenovic 6	Polideportivo Islas Malvinas, Mar del Plata; Attendance: 500; Referees: Schaller, Wutzler (GER)
15 August 2011; 14:00	3× (yellow card) 3× (suspension)	Report	3× (yellow card) 4× (suspension)	Polideportivo Islas Malvinas, Mar del Plata; Attendance: 500; Referees: Schaller, Wutzler (GER)

15 August 2011; 16:00	Slovenia	30 – 30	Sweden	Polideportivo Islas Malvinas, Mar del Plata; Attendance: 500; Referees: El Sayed, Zidan (EGY)
15 August 2011; 16:00	Šoštarić 8	(16–15)	Gottfridsson 10	Polideportivo Islas Malvinas, Mar del Plata; Attendance: 500; Referees: El Sayed, Zidan (EGY)
15 August 2011; 16:00	3× (yellow card) 3× (suspension)	Report	5× (yellow card) 3× (suspension)	Polideportivo Islas Malvinas, Mar del Plata; Attendance: 500; Referees: El Sayed, Zidan (EGY)

=== Group B ===
Team	Pld	W	D	L	GF	GA	GD	Pts
France	4	4	0	0	144	96	+48	8
Egypt	4	3	0	1	138	88	+50	6
Brazil	4	2	0	2	138	111	+27	4
Qatar	4	1	0	3	125	95	+30	2
New Zealand	4	0	0	4	56	211	−155	0

10 August 2011; 14:30	France	32 – 31	Brazil	Once Unidos, Mar del Plata; Attendance: 1,200; Referees: Kliko, Johansson (SWE)
10 August 2011; 14:30	Boschi, Descat 8	(18–14)	Patrianova 8	Once Unidos, Mar del Plata; Attendance: 1,200; Referees: Kliko, Johansson (SWE)
10 August 2011; 14:30	3× (yellow card) 4× (suspension) 2× (red card)	Report	3× (yellow card) 4× (suspension)	Once Unidos, Mar del Plata; Attendance: 1,200; Referees: Kliko, Johansson (SWE)

10 August 2011; 16:30	Qatar	53 – 14	New Zealand	Polideportivo Islas Malvinas, Mar del Plata; Attendance: 200; Referees: Muya Kupa, Mobati (COD)
10 August 2011; 16:30	Alshammari, Memisevic 9	(34–6)	Quin, Atkinson 4	Polideportivo Islas Malvinas, Mar del Plata; Attendance: 200; Referees: Muya Kupa, Mobati (COD)
10 August 2011; 16:30	3× (yellow card) 4× (suspension)	Report	3× (yellow card) 4× (suspension)	Polideportivo Islas Malvinas, Mar del Plata; Attendance: 200; Referees: Muya Kupa, Mobati (COD)

11 August 2011; 14:30	Egypt	38 – 21	Brazil	Once Unidos, Mar del Plata; Referees: Lah, Sok (SLO)
11 August 2011; 14:30	Tamer 8	(20–8)	three players 4	Once Unidos, Mar del Plata; Referees: Lah, Sok (SLO)
11 August 2011; 14:30	2× (yellow card) 3× (suspension)	Report	3× (yellow card) 3× (suspension)	Once Unidos, Mar del Plata; Referees: Lah, Sok (SLO)

11 August 2011; 16:30	New Zealand	16 – 55	France	Once Unidos, Mar del Plata; Attendance: 200; Referees: Akpatsa, Assignon (TOG)
11 August 2011; 16:30	Atkinson 7	(9–26)	Descat 15	Once Unidos, Mar del Plata; Attendance: 200; Referees: Akpatsa, Assignon (TOG)
11 August 2011; 16:30	2× (yellow card) 2× (suspension)	Report	5× (yellow card) 4× (suspension)	Once Unidos, Mar del Plata; Attendance: 200; Referees: Akpatsa, Assignon (TOG)

12 August 2011; 19:00	Qatar	23 – 24	Egypt	Polideportivo Islas Malvinas, Mar del Plata; Attendance: 500; Referees: Grillo, Lenci (ARG)
12 August 2011; 19:00	Hamdoon 6	(11–13)	Khalil 10	Polideportivo Islas Malvinas, Mar del Plata; Attendance: 500; Referees: Grillo, Lenci (ARG)
12 August 2011; 19:00	2× (yellow card) 4× (suspension) 1× (red card)	Report	2× (yellow card) 6× (suspension) 1× (red card)	Polideportivo Islas Malvinas, Mar del Plata; Attendance: 500; Referees: Grillo, Lenci (ARG)

13 August 2011; 14:30	Brazil	54 – 14	New Zealand	Once Unidos, Mar del Plata; Attendance: 100; Referees: Li, Wang (CHN)
13 August 2011; 14:30	de Lima 10	(31–7)	Burnett 5	Once Unidos, Mar del Plata; Attendance: 100; Referees: Li, Wang (CHN)
13 August 2011; 14:30	2× (yellow card) 3× (suspension)	Report	1× (yellow card) 3× (suspension)	Once Unidos, Mar del Plata; Attendance: 100; Referees: Li, Wang (CHN)

13 August 2011; 19:00	France	25 – 22	Qatar	Polideportivo Islas Malvinas, Mar del Plata; Attendance: 300; Referees: Santos, Fonseca (POR)
13 August 2011; 19:00	Descat 8	(15–12)	Hamdoon 6	Polideportivo Islas Malvinas, Mar del Plata; Attendance: 300; Referees: Santos, Fonseca (POR)
13 August 2011; 19:00	9× (yellow card) 3× (suspension)	Report	7× (yellow card) 2× (suspension)	Polideportivo Islas Malvinas, Mar del Plata; Attendance: 300; Referees: Santos, Fonseca (POR)

14 August 2011; 18:00	New Zealand	12 – 49	Egypt	Once Unidos, Mar del Plata; Attendance: 100; Referees: Akpatsa, Assignon (TOG)
14 August 2011; 18:00	Palmer 4	(5–26)	El-Menshawy, Yousry 7	Once Unidos, Mar del Plata; Attendance: 100; Referees: Akpatsa, Assignon (TOG)
14 August 2011; 18:00	3× (yellow card) 2× (suspension)	Report	3× (yellow card) 2× (suspension)	Once Unidos, Mar del Plata; Attendance: 100; Referees: Akpatsa, Assignon (TOG)

15 August 2011; 16:30	Egypt	27 – 32	France	Once Unidos, Mar del Plata; Attendance: 250; Referees: Al-Suwaidi, Bamatraf (QAT)
15 August 2011; 16:30	Tamer 6	(15–16)	Minel, Ballet Kebengue 6	Once Unidos, Mar del Plata; Attendance: 250; Referees: Al-Suwaidi, Bamatraf (QAT)
15 August 2011; 16:30	2× (yellow card) 3× (suspension)	Report	7× (yellow card) 3× (suspension)	Once Unidos, Mar del Plata; Attendance: 250; Referees: Al-Suwaidi, Bamatraf (QAT)

15 August 2011; 20:00	Brazil	32 – 27	Qatar	Polideportivo Islas Malvinas, Mar del Plata; Attendance: 250; Referees: Laj, Sok (SLO)
15 August 2011; 20:00	Dias 7	(14–14)	Memisevic, Chaieb 5	Polideportivo Islas Malvinas, Mar del Plata; Attendance: 250; Referees: Laj, Sok (SLO)
15 August 2011; 20:00	6× (yellow card) 3× (suspension)	Report	5× (yellow card) 4× (suspension)	Polideportivo Islas Malvinas, Mar del Plata; Attendance: 250; Referees: Laj, Sok (SLO)

=== Group C ===
Team	Pld	W	D	L	GF	GA	GD	Pts
Germany	4	4	0	0	130	106	+24	8
Denmark	4	2	1	1	109	103	+6	5
South Korea	4	1	1	2	116	127	−11	3
Russia	4	1	1	2	106	118	−12	3
Tunisia	4	0	1	3	108	115	−7	1

10 August 2011; 18:30	Germany	40 – 30	South Korea	Once Unidos, Mar del Plata; Attendance: 300; Referees: Eliasson, Dugjonsson (ISL)
10 August 2011; 18:30	Kuhn 10	(16–17)	Lee Hyeon-Sik 11	Once Unidos, Mar del Plata; Attendance: 300; Referees: Eliasson, Dugjonsson (ISL)
10 August 2011; 18:30	3× (yellow card) 9× (suspension)	Report	3× (yellow card) 5× (suspension)	Once Unidos, Mar del Plata; Attendance: 300; Referees: Eliasson, Dugjonsson (ISL)

10 August 2011; 20:30	Tunisia	26 – 28	Russia	Once Unidos, Mar del Plata; Attendance: 255; Referees: Grillo, Lenci (ARG)
10 August 2011; 20:30	Jallouz 6	(14–14)	Dereven 11	Once Unidos, Mar del Plata; Attendance: 255; Referees: Grillo, Lenci (ARG)
10 August 2011; 20:30	3× (yellow card) 10× (suspension)	Report	3× (yellow card) 7× (suspension)	Once Unidos, Mar del Plata; Attendance: 255; Referees: Grillo, Lenci (ARG)

11 August 2011; 18:30	Denmark	29 – 26	South Korea	Once Unidos, Mar del Plata; Attendance: 200; Referees: Paz, Souza (BRA)
11 August 2011; 18:30	Baagoe 8	(12–16)	Lee Hyeon-Sik 12	Once Unidos, Mar del Plata; Attendance: 200; Referees: Paz, Souza (BRA)
11 August 2011; 18:30	6× (yellow card) 2× (suspension)	Report	4× (yellow card) 3× (suspension)	Once Unidos, Mar del Plata; Attendance: 200; Referees: Paz, Souza (BRA)

11 August 2011; 20:30	Russia	26 – 34	Germany	Once Unidos, Mar del Plata; Attendance: 200; Referees: Kliko, Johansson (SWE)
11 August 2011; 20:30	Kantemirov 5	(15–19)	Eisenträger 7	Once Unidos, Mar del Plata; Attendance: 200; Referees: Kliko, Johansson (SWE)
11 August 2011; 20:30	7× (yellow card) 4× (suspension) 1× (red card)	Report	7× (yellow card) 4× (suspension)	Once Unidos, Mar del Plata; Attendance: 200; Referees: Kliko, Johansson (SWE)

12 August 2011; 16:30	Tunisia	27 – 27	Denmark	Once Unidos, Mar del Plata; Attendance: 210; Referees: Al-Suwaidi, Bamatraf (QAT)
12 August 2011; 16:30	Jaziri 10	(14–15)	H.Ellebaek 5	Once Unidos, Mar del Plata; Attendance: 210; Referees: Al-Suwaidi, Bamatraf (QAT)
12 August 2011; 16:30	3× (yellow card) 3× (suspension)	Report	3× (yellow card) 4× (suspension)	Once Unidos, Mar del Plata; Attendance: 210; Referees: Al-Suwaidi, Bamatraf (QAT)

13 August 2011; 18:30	South Korea	29 – 29	Russia	Once Unidos, Mar del Plata; Attendance: 490; Referees: El Sayed, Zidan (EGY)
13 August 2011; 18:30	Ha Min-Ho 7	(13–14)	Kantemirov, Dereven 7	Once Unidos, Mar del Plata; Attendance: 490; Referees: El Sayed, Zidan (EGY)
13 August 2011; 18:30	3× (yellow card) 3× (suspension)	Report	3× (yellow card) 3× (suspension)	Once Unidos, Mar del Plata; Attendance: 490; Referees: El Sayed, Zidan (EGY)

13 August 2011; 20:30	Germany	29 – 26	Tunisia	Once Unidos, Mar del Plata; Attendance: 350; Referees: Gonzales, Prieto (URU)
13 August 2011; 20:30	Wiede, Feld 7	(16–13)	Jaziri 6	Once Unidos, Mar del Plata; Attendance: 350; Referees: Gonzales, Prieto (URU)
13 August 2011; 20:30	6× (yellow card) 2× (suspension)	Report	3× (yellow card) 3× (suspension)	Once Unidos, Mar del Plata; Attendance: 350; Referees: Gonzales, Prieto (URU)

14 August 2011; 21:00	Russia	23 – 29	Denmark	Once Unidos, Mar del Plata; Attendance: 300; Referees: Santos, Fonseca (POR)
14 August 2011; 21:00	Dereven 8	(12–14)	N.Pedersen 7	Once Unidos, Mar del Plata; Attendance: 300; Referees: Santos, Fonseca (POR)
14 August 2011; 21:00	3× (yellow card) 1× (suspension)	Report	3× (yellow card) 3× (suspension)	Once Unidos, Mar del Plata; Attendance: 300; Referees: Santos, Fonseca (POR)

15 August 2011; 14:30	South Korea	31 – 29	Tunisia	Once Unidos, Mar del Plata; Attendance: 250; Referees: Erdoğan, Özdeniz (TUR)
15 August 2011; 14:30	Lee Hyeon-Sik 8	(16–15)	Jaziri 7	Once Unidos, Mar del Plata; Attendance: 250; Referees: Erdoğan, Özdeniz (TUR)
15 August 2011; 14:30	6× (yellow card) 3× (suspension)	Report	5× (yellow card) 2× (suspension)	Once Unidos, Mar del Plata; Attendance: 250; Referees: Erdoğan, Özdeniz (TUR)

15 August 2011; 20:30	Denmark	24 – 27	Germany	Once Unidos, Mar del Plata; Attendance: 400; Referees: Grillo, Lenci (ARG)
15 August 2011; 20:30	Kisum 5	(10–16)	four players 4	Once Unidos, Mar del Plata; Attendance: 400; Referees: Grillo, Lenci (ARG)
15 August 2011; 20:30	1× (yellow card) 3× (suspension)	Report	4× (yellow card) 3× (suspension)	Once Unidos, Mar del Plata; Attendance: 400; Referees: Grillo, Lenci (ARG)

=== Group D ===
Team	Pld	W	D	L	GF	GA	GD	Pts
Switzerland	4	4	0	0	127	86	+41	8
Spain	4	3	0	1	114	80	+34	6
Argentina	4	2	0	2	110	94	+16	4
Chile	4	1	0	3	77	104	−27	2
Gabon	4	0	0	4	76	138	−62	0

10 August 2011; 15:00	Argentina	30 – 22	Chile	Polideportivo Islas Malvinas, Mar del Plata; Attendance: 8,000; Referees: Schaller, Wutzler (GER)
10 August 2011; 15:00	Souto Cueto 10	(14–11)	Reyes 7	Polideportivo Islas Malvinas, Mar del Plata; Attendance: 8,000; Referees: Schaller, Wutzler (GER)
10 August 2011; 15:00	2× (yellow card) 3× (suspension)	Report	3× (yellow card) 8× (suspension)	Polideportivo Islas Malvinas, Mar del Plata; Attendance: 8,000; Referees: Schaller, Wutzler (GER)

10 August 2011; 17:00	Switzerland	44 – 24	Gabon	Polideportivo Islas Malvinas, Mar del Plata; Attendance: 300; Referees: Gonzales, Prieto (URU)
10 August 2011; 17:00	Muggli 7	(23–9)	Aubyang 10	Polideportivo Islas Malvinas, Mar del Plata; Attendance: 300; Referees: Gonzales, Prieto (URU)
10 August 2011; 17:00	3× (yellow card) 4× (suspension)	Report	3× (yellow card) 2× (suspension)	Polideportivo Islas Malvinas, Mar del Plata; Attendance: 300; Referees: Gonzales, Prieto (URU)

11 August 2011; 14:30	Spain	33 – 13	Gabon	Polideportivo Islas Malvinas, Mar del Plata; Attendance: 500; Referees: Erdoğan, Özdeniz (TUR)
11 August 2011; 14:30	Arino Bengoechea 6	(16–6)	Camara 4	Polideportivo Islas Malvinas, Mar del Plata; Attendance: 500; Referees: Erdoğan, Özdeniz (TUR)
11 August 2011; 14:30	5× (yellow card) 1× (suspension)	Report	8× (yellow card) 3× (suspension)	Polideportivo Islas Malvinas, Mar del Plata; Attendance: 500; Referees: Erdoğan, Özdeniz (TUR)

11 August 2011; 16:30	Chile	16 – 31	Switzerland	Polideportivo Islas Malvinas, Mar del Plata; Attendance: 800; Referees: Li, Wang (CHN)
11 August 2011; 16:30	Reyes 7	(8–16)	Lier 9	Polideportivo Islas Malvinas, Mar del Plata; Attendance: 800; Referees: Li, Wang (CHN)
11 August 2011; 16:30	4× (yellow card) 3× (suspension)	Report	6× (yellow card) 2× (suspension)	Polideportivo Islas Malvinas, Mar del Plata; Attendance: 800; Referees: Li, Wang (CHN)

12 August 2011; 15:00	Argentina	23 – 25	Spain	Polideportivo Islas Malvinas, Mar del Plata; Attendance: 5,000; Referees: Lah, Sok (SLO)
12 August 2011; 15:00	Five Players 4	(12–13)	Sanchez, Sala 5	Polideportivo Islas Malvinas, Mar del Plata; Attendance: 5,000; Referees: Lah, Sok (SLO)
12 August 2011; 15:00	3× (yellow card) 1× (suspension)	Report	3× (yellow card) 2× (suspension)	Polideportivo Islas Malvinas, Mar del Plata; Attendance: 5,000; Referees: Lah, Sok (SLO)

13 August 2011; 15:00	Switzerland	23 – 20	Argentina	Polideportivo Islas Malvinas, Mar del Plata; Attendance: 6,000; Referees: Kliko, Johansson (SWE)
13 August 2011; 15:00	Raemy 8	(10–12)	Souto Cueto, Baronetto 6	Polideportivo Islas Malvinas, Mar del Plata; Attendance: 6,000; Referees: Kliko, Johansson (SWE)
13 August 2011; 15:00	5× (yellow card) 3× (suspension)	Report	6× (yellow card) 3× (suspension)	Polideportivo Islas Malvinas, Mar del Plata; Attendance: 6,000; Referees: Kliko, Johansson (SWE)

13 August 2011; 21:00	Gabon	15 – 24	Chile	Polideportivo Islas Malvinas, Mar del Plata; Attendance: 500; Referees: Paz, Sousa (BRA)
13 August 2011; 21:00	Aubyang 9	(7–8)	Gomez 7	Polideportivo Islas Malvinas, Mar del Plata; Attendance: 500; Referees: Paz, Sousa (BRA)
13 August 2011; 21:00	3× (yellow card) 3× (suspension)	Report	8× (yellow card) 3× (suspension)	Polideportivo Islas Malvinas, Mar del Plata; Attendance: 500; Referees: Paz, Sousa (BRA)

14 August 2011; 21:00	Chile	15 – 28	Spain	Polideportivo Islas Malvinas, Mar del Plata; Referees: Muya Kupa, Mobati (COD)
14 August 2011; 21:00	Javier 4	(9–11)	four Players 4	Polideportivo Islas Malvinas, Mar del Plata; Referees: Muya Kupa, Mobati (COD)
14 August 2011; 21:00	3× (yellow card) 2× (suspension)	Report	3× (yellow card) 2× (suspension)	Polideportivo Islas Malvinas, Mar del Plata; Referees: Muya Kupa, Mobati (COD)

15 August 2011; 18:00	Gabon	24 – 37	Argentina	Polideportivo Islas Malvinas, Mar del Plata; Attendance: 1,500; Referees: Li, Wang (CHN)
15 August 2011; 18:00	Aubyang 10	(13–20)	Molina 10	Polideportivo Islas Malvinas, Mar del Plata; Attendance: 1,500; Referees: Li, Wang (CHN)
15 August 2011; 18:00	4× (yellow card) 3× (suspension)	Report	2× (yellow card) 2× (suspension)	Polideportivo Islas Malvinas, Mar del Plata; Attendance: 1,500; Referees: Li, Wang (CHN)

15 August 2011; 18:30	Spain	28 – 29	Switzerland	Once Unidos, Mar del Plata; Attendance: 400; Referees: Eliasson, Gudjonsson (ISL)
15 August 2011; 18:30	Dujshebaev Dobichebaeva 9	(13–10)	Raemy 10	Once Unidos, Mar del Plata; Attendance: 400; Referees: Eliasson, Gudjonsson (ISL)
15 August 2011; 18:30	3× (yellow card) 2× (suspension)	Report	3× (yellow card) 3× (suspension)	Once Unidos, Mar del Plata; Attendance: 400; Referees: Eliasson, Gudjonsson (ISL)

== Knockout stage ==
=== Championship bracket ===
Quarterfinals
Sweden	26
Egypt	25
Spain	25
Germany	22
France	31
Croatia	30
Denmark	37
Switzerland	20

Semifinals
Sweden	23
Spain	24
France	26
Denmark	29

Final
Spain	22
Denmark	24
Third place
Sweden	28
France	24

==== Quarterfinals ====
17 August 2011; 17:30	Sweden	26 – 25	Egypt	Polideportivo Islas Malvinas, Mar del Plata; Attendance: 400; Referees: Lah, Sok (SLO)
17 August 2011; 17:30	Gottfridsson, Persson 7	(11–12)	Khalil 8	Polideportivo Islas Malvinas, Mar del Plata; Attendance: 400; Referees: Lah, Sok (SLO)
17 August 2011; 17:30	4× (yellow card) 3× (suspension)	Report	4× (yellow card) 2× (suspension)	Polideportivo Islas Malvinas, Mar del Plata; Attendance: 400; Referees: Lah, Sok (SLO)

17 August 2011; 17:30	France	31 – 30	Croatia	Once Unidos, Mar del Plata; Attendance: 400; Referees: Kliko, Johansson (SWE)
17 August 2011; 17:30	Descat 11	(11–12)	Milicevic 8	Once Unidos, Mar del Plata; Attendance: 400; Referees: Kliko, Johansson (SWE)
17 August 2011; 17:30	3× (yellow card) 1× (suspension)	Report	4× (yellow card) 4× (suspension)	Once Unidos, Mar del Plata; Attendance: 400; Referees: Kliko, Johansson (SWE)

17 August 2011; 20:00	Denmark	37 – 20	Switzerland	Once Unidos, Mar del Plata; Attendance: 300; Referees: Gonzalez, Prieto (URU)
17 August 2011; 20:00	Sørensen 6	(17–10)	Raemy 8	Once Unidos, Mar del Plata; Attendance: 300; Referees: Gonzalez, Prieto (URU)
17 August 2011; 20:00	3× (yellow card)	Report	3× (yellow card) 1× (suspension)	Once Unidos, Mar del Plata; Attendance: 300; Referees: Gonzalez, Prieto (URU)

17 August 2011; 20:00	Spain	25 – 22	Germany	Polideportivo Islas Malvinas, Mar del Plata; Attendance: 500; Referees: Al Suwaidi, Bamatraf (QAT)
17 August 2011; 20:00	Saez Lozano, Cacheda Gonzalez 5	(14–10)	Kuhn 8	Polideportivo Islas Malvinas, Mar del Plata; Attendance: 500; Referees: Al Suwaidi, Bamatraf (QAT)
17 August 2011; 20:00	3× (yellow card) 4× (suspension)	Report	3× (yellow card) 8× (suspension)	Polideportivo Islas Malvinas, Mar del Plata; Attendance: 500; Referees: Al Suwaidi, Bamatraf (QAT)

==== Semifinals ====
18 August 2011; 17:30	Sweden	23 – 24	Spain	Polideportivo Islas Malvinas, Mar del Plata; Attendance: 1,000; Referees: Lah, Sok (SLO)
18 August 2011; 17:30	Gottfridsson 10	(10–11)	Arino Bengoechea 6	Polideportivo Islas Malvinas, Mar del Plata; Attendance: 1,000; Referees: Lah, Sok (SLO)
18 August 2011; 17:30	2× (yellow card) 3× (suspension)	Report	3× (yellow card) 3× (suspension)	Polideportivo Islas Malvinas, Mar del Plata; Attendance: 1,000; Referees: Lah, Sok (SLO)

18 August 2011; 20:00	France	26 – 29	Denmark	Polideportivo Islas Malvinas, Mar del Plata; Attendance: 300; Referees: Al-Suwaidi, Bamatraf (QAT)
18 August 2011; 20:00	Minel 5	(16–13)	Pedersen 8	Polideportivo Islas Malvinas, Mar del Plata; Attendance: 300; Referees: Al-Suwaidi, Bamatraf (QAT)
18 August 2011; 20:00	2× (yellow card) 2× (suspension)	Report	1× (yellow card) 2× (suspension)	Polideportivo Islas Malvinas, Mar del Plata; Attendance: 300; Referees: Al-Suwaidi, Bamatraf (QAT)

==== Third place game ====
20 August 2011; 14:30	Sweden	28 – 24	France	Polideportivo Islas Malvinas, Mar del Plata; Referees: Santos, Fonseca (POR)
20 August 2011; 14:30	Wanne 6	(15–10)	Descat 8	Polideportivo Islas Malvinas, Mar del Plata; Referees: Santos, Fonseca (POR)
20 August 2011; 14:30	2× (yellow card) 5× (suspension)	Report	3× (yellow card) 4× (suspension)	Polideportivo Islas Malvinas, Mar del Plata; Referees: Santos, Fonseca (POR)

==== Final ====
20 August 2011; 17:00	Spain	22 – 24	Denmark	Polideportivo Islas Malvinas, Mar del Plata; Attendance: 4,500; Referees: Eliasson, Gudjonsson (ISL)
20 August 2011; 17:00	Plaza Jimenez, Costoya Rodríguez 4	(17–13)	Baagoe 7	Polideportivo Islas Malvinas, Mar del Plata; Attendance: 4,500; Referees: Eliasson, Gudjonsson (ISL)
20 August 2011; 17:00	3× (yellow card)	Report	3× (yellow card) 2× (suspension)	Polideportivo Islas Malvinas, Mar del Plata; Attendance: 4,500; Referees: Eliasson, Gudjonsson (ISL)

=== 5–8th place bracket ===
Semifinals
Egypt	29
Germany	28
Croatia	23
Switzerland	32

Fifth place
Egypt	25
Switzerland	24
Seventh place
Germany	29
Croatia	28

==== Semifinals ====
18 August 2011; 17:30	Egypt	29 – 28	Germany	Once Unidos, Mar del Plata; Attendance: 150; Referees: Santos, Fonseca (POR)
18 August 2011; 17:30	Hamed 7	(15–11)	Wiede 8	Once Unidos, Mar del Plata; Attendance: 150; Referees: Santos, Fonseca (POR)
18 August 2011; 17:30	3× (yellow card) 8× (suspension)	Report	3× (yellow card) 8× (suspension)	Once Unidos, Mar del Plata; Attendance: 150; Referees: Santos, Fonseca (POR)

18 August 2011; 20:00	Croatia	23 – 32	Switzerland	Once Unidos, Mar del Plata; Attendance: 315; Referees: Paz, Souza (BRA)
18 August 2011; 20:00	Kaleb 5	(10–13)	Jud 11	Once Unidos, Mar del Plata; Attendance: 315; Referees: Paz, Souza (BRA)
18 August 2011; 20:00	4× (yellow card) 2× (suspension)	Report	3× (yellow card) 7× (suspension)	Once Unidos, Mar del Plata; Attendance: 315; Referees: Paz, Souza (BRA)

==== Seventh place game ====
20 August 2011; 09:30	Germany	29 – 28	Croatia	Polideportivo Islas Malvinas, Mar del Plata; Attendance: 300; Referees: Erdoğan, Özdeniz (TUR)
20 August 2011; 09:30	Kuhn 9	(17–15)	Mandalinic 8	Polideportivo Islas Malvinas, Mar del Plata; Attendance: 300; Referees: Erdoğan, Özdeniz (TUR)
20 August 2011; 09:30	3× (yellow card) 4× (suspension)	Report	2× (yellow card) 1× (suspension)	Polideportivo Islas Malvinas, Mar del Plata; Attendance: 300; Referees: Erdoğan, Özdeniz (TUR)

==== Fifth place game ====
20 August 2011; 12:00	Egypt	25 – 24	Switzerland	Polideportivo Islas Malvinas, Mar del Plata; Attendance: 1,000; Referees: Al-Suwaidi, Bamatraf (QAT)
20 August 2011; 12:00	Osama 6	(13–12)	three players 6	Polideportivo Islas Malvinas, Mar del Plata; Attendance: 1,000; Referees: Al-Suwaidi, Bamatraf (QAT)
20 August 2011; 12:00	3× (yellow card) 2× (suspension)	Report	3× (yellow card) 1× (suspension)	Polideportivo Islas Malvinas, Mar del Plata; Attendance: 1,000; Referees: Al-Suwaidi, Bamatraf (QAT)

=== 9–12th place bracket ===
Semifinals
Slovenia	32
Brazil	27
South Korea	27
Argentina	32

Ninth place
Slovenia	32
Argentina	29
Eleventh place
Brazil	31
South Korea	36

==== Semifinals ====
17 August 2011; 15:00	Slovenia	32 – 27	Brazil	Once Unidos, Mar del Plata; Attendance: 250; Referees: Santos, Fonseca (POR)
17 August 2011; 15:00	Sostaric 11	(16–15)	Dias 8	Once Unidos, Mar del Plata; Attendance: 250; Referees: Santos, Fonseca (POR)
17 August 2011; 15:00	4× (yellow card) 6× (suspension)	Report	3× (yellow card) 6× (suspension)	Once Unidos, Mar del Plata; Attendance: 250; Referees: Santos, Fonseca (POR)

17 August 2011; 15:00	South Korea	27 – 32	Argentina	Polideportivo Islas Malvinas, Mar del Plata; Attendance: 2,000; Referees: El Sayed, Zidan (EGY)
17 August 2011; 15:00	Lee Hyeon-Sik 9	(10–15)	Souto Cueto 12	Polideportivo Islas Malvinas, Mar del Plata; Attendance: 2,000; Referees: El Sayed, Zidan (EGY)
17 August 2011; 15:00	2× (yellow card) 5× (suspension)	Report	4× (yellow card) 6× (suspension)	Polideportivo Islas Malvinas, Mar del Plata; Attendance: 2,000; Referees: El Sayed, Zidan (EGY)

==== Eleventh place game ====
18 August 2011; 15:00	Brazil	31 – 36	South Korea	Once Unidos, Mar del Plata; Attendance: 230; Referees: Gang, Wang (CHN)
18 August 2011; 15:00	Silva 6	(16–18)	Lee Hyeon-Sik 9	Once Unidos, Mar del Plata; Attendance: 230; Referees: Gang, Wang (CHN)
18 August 2011; 15:00	3× (yellow card) 5× (suspension)	Report	3× (yellow card) 1× (suspension)	Once Unidos, Mar del Plata; Attendance: 230; Referees: Gang, Wang (CHN)

==== Ninth place game ====
18 August 2011; 15:00	Slovenia	32 – 29	Argentina	Polideportivo Islas Malvinas, Mar del Plata; Attendance: 2,500; Referees: Eliasson, Gudjonsson (ISL)
18 August 2011; 15:00	Cehte, Fidel 8	(16–17)	Simonet 6	Polideportivo Islas Malvinas, Mar del Plata; Attendance: 2,500; Referees: Eliasson, Gudjonsson (ISL)
18 August 2011; 15:00	4× (yellow card) 5× (suspension)	Report	3× (yellow card) 4× (suspension)	Polideportivo Islas Malvinas, Mar del Plata; Attendance: 2,500; Referees: Eliasson, Gudjonsson (ISL)

=== 13–16th place bracket ===
Semifinals
Serbia	33
Qatar	22
Russia	41
Chile	29

Thirteenth place
Serbia	29
Russia	34
Fifteenth place
Qatar	35
Chile	24

==== Semifinals ====
17 August 2011; 12:45	Serbia	33 – 22	Qatar	Polideportivo Islas Malvinas, Mar del Plata; Referees: Muya Kupa, Sangwani (COD)
17 August 2011; 12:45	Vucicevic, Pavic 6	(17–12)	Mallash 5	Polideportivo Islas Malvinas, Mar del Plata; Referees: Muya Kupa, Sangwani (COD)
17 August 2011; 12:45	2× (yellow card) 5× (suspension)	Report	3× (yellow card) 4× (suspension)	Polideportivo Islas Malvinas, Mar del Plata; Referees: Muya Kupa, Sangwani (COD)

17 August 2011; 12:45	Russia	41 – 29	Chile	Once Unidos, Mar del Plata; Attendance: 200; Referees: Akpatsa, Asignon (TOG)
17 August 2011; 12:45	Dereven 12	(21–17)	Salinas 9	Once Unidos, Mar del Plata; Attendance: 200; Referees: Akpatsa, Asignon (TOG)
17 August 2011; 12:45	4× (yellow card) 4× (suspension)	Report	3× (yellow card) 4× (suspension)	Once Unidos, Mar del Plata; Attendance: 200; Referees: Akpatsa, Asignon (TOG)

==== Fifteenth place game ====
18 August 2011; 12:45	Qatar	35 – 24	Chile	Polideportivo Islas Malvinas, Mar del Plata; Attendance: 400; Referees: Bartlett, Stokes (GBR)
18 August 2011; 12:45	Mallash 7	(14–11)	Reyes 8	Polideportivo Islas Malvinas, Mar del Plata; Attendance: 400; Referees: Bartlett, Stokes (GBR)
18 August 2011; 12:45	3× (yellow card) 4× (suspension)	Report	3× (yellow card)	Polideportivo Islas Malvinas, Mar del Plata; Attendance: 400; Referees: Bartlett, Stokes (GBR)

==== Thirteenth place game ====
18 August 2011; 12:45	Serbia	29 – 34	Russia	Once Unidos, Mar del Plata; Attendance: 200; Referees: Grillo, Lenci (ARG)
18 August 2011; 12:45	Pavic 6	(13–17)	Dereven 9	Once Unidos, Mar del Plata; Attendance: 200; Referees: Grillo, Lenci (ARG)
18 August 2011; 12:45	3× (yellow card) 5× (suspension)	Report	3× (yellow card) 7× (suspension)	Once Unidos, Mar del Plata; Attendance: 200; Referees: Grillo, Lenci (ARG)

=== 17–20th place bracket ===
Semifinals
Bahrain	61
New Zealand	20
Tunisia	27
Gabon	14

Seventeenth place
Bahrain	32
Tunisia	30
Nineteenth place
New Zealand	21
Gabon	35

==== Semifinals ====
17 August 2011; 10:30	Bahrain	61 – 20	New Zealand	Once Unidos, Mar del Plata; Attendance: 100; Referees: Grillo, Lenci (ARG)
17 August 2011; 10:30	Al-Maqabi, Afrooz 12	(31–8)	Palmer 5	Once Unidos, Mar del Plata; Attendance: 100; Referees: Grillo, Lenci (ARG)
17 August 2011; 10:30	3× (yellow card) 2× (suspension)	Report	3× (yellow card) 3× (suspension)	Once Unidos, Mar del Plata; Attendance: 100; Referees: Grillo, Lenci (ARG)

17 August 2011; 10:30	Tunisia	27 – 14	Gabon	Polideportivo Islas Malvinas, Mar del Plata; Attendance: 200; Referees: Bartlett, Stokes (GBR)
17 August 2011; 10:30	Trabelsi 4	(13–10)	Aubyang 5	Polideportivo Islas Malvinas, Mar del Plata; Attendance: 200; Referees: Bartlett, Stokes (GBR)
17 August 2011; 10:30	2× (yellow card) 1× (suspension)	Report	3× (yellow card) 6× (suspension)	Polideportivo Islas Malvinas, Mar del Plata; Attendance: 200; Referees: Bartlett, Stokes (GBR)

==== Nineteenth place game ====
18 August 2011; 10:30	New Zealand	21 – 35	Gabon	Polideportivo Islas Malvinas, Mar del Plata; Attendance: 300; Referees: Akpatsa, Assignon (TOG)
18 August 2011; 10:30	Quin 6	(9–13)	Aubyang 15	Polideportivo Islas Malvinas, Mar del Plata; Attendance: 300; Referees: Akpatsa, Assignon (TOG)
18 August 2011; 10:30	2× (yellow card) 4× (suspension)	Report	2× (yellow card) 7× (suspension)	Polideportivo Islas Malvinas, Mar del Plata; Attendance: 300; Referees: Akpatsa, Assignon (TOG)

==== Seventeenth place game ====
18 August 2011; 10:30	Bahrain	32 – 30	Tunisia	Once Unidos, Mar del Plata; Attendance: 300; Referees: Muya Kupa, Mobati (COD)
18 August 2011; 10:30	Saleh 10	(17–15)	Jaziri, Jallouz 6	Once Unidos, Mar del Plata; Attendance: 300; Referees: Muya Kupa, Mobati (COD)
18 August 2011; 10:30	3× (yellow card) 5× (suspension)	Report	3× (yellow card) 3× (suspension)	Once Unidos, Mar del Plata; Attendance: 300; Referees: Muya Kupa, Mobati (COD)

== Final standings ==
Rank	Team
Gold medal	Denmark
Silver medal	Spain
Bronze medal	Sweden
4	France
5	Egypt
6	Switzerland
7	Germany
8	Croatia
9	Slovenia
10	Argentina
11	South Korea
12	Brazil
13	Russia
14	Serbia
15	Qatar
16	Chile
17	Bahrain
18	Tunisia
19	Gabon
20	New Zealand

== Awards ==
=== All-star team ===
- Goalkeeper: Nikola Portner (SUI)
- Left wing: Hugo Descat (FRA)
- Left back: Theis Baagøe (DEN)
- Pivot: Ignacio Plaza Jiménez (ESP)
- Centre back: Aitor Ariño (ESP)
- Right back: Martin Larsen (DEN)
- Right wing: Mario Šoštarič (SVN)

=== Other awards ===
- MVP: Jim Gottfridsson (SWE)
- Most promising player: Nicolai Nygaard Pedersen (DEN)
