= Jaziri =

Jaziri is an Arabic surname. Notable people with the surname include:

- Ahmed Jaziri (born 1997), Tunisian steeplechaser
- Assil Jaziri (born 1999), Tunisian footballer
- Fadhel Jaziri (1948–2025), Tunisian actor and film director
- Fakhreddine Jaziri (born 1989), Tunisian footballer
- Malaye Jaziri (1570–1640), one of the most famous Kurdish writer, poet and mystic
- Malek Jaziri (born 1984), Tunisian tennis player
- Oussama Jaziri (born 1992), Tunisian handball player
- Seifeddine Jaziri (born 1993), Tunisian footballer
- Ziad Jaziri (born 1978), Tunisian footballer

== See also ==
- Dar Al Jaziri, palace in the medina of Tunis
