= Association de sauvegarde de la médina de Tunis =

The Association de sauvegarde de la médina de Tunis (Association for the protection of the medina of Tunis) was established in 1967 to conserve the Medina quarter in the old heart of Tunis. Its mission is "to strive for the conservation and protection of the overall traditional urban form of the Medina, its historical structures with all its distinctive elements and cultural heritage, and to take actions to ensure its preservation and enhancement."

Its current president (2015) is the city's former mayor, Abbès Mohsen.

== History ==
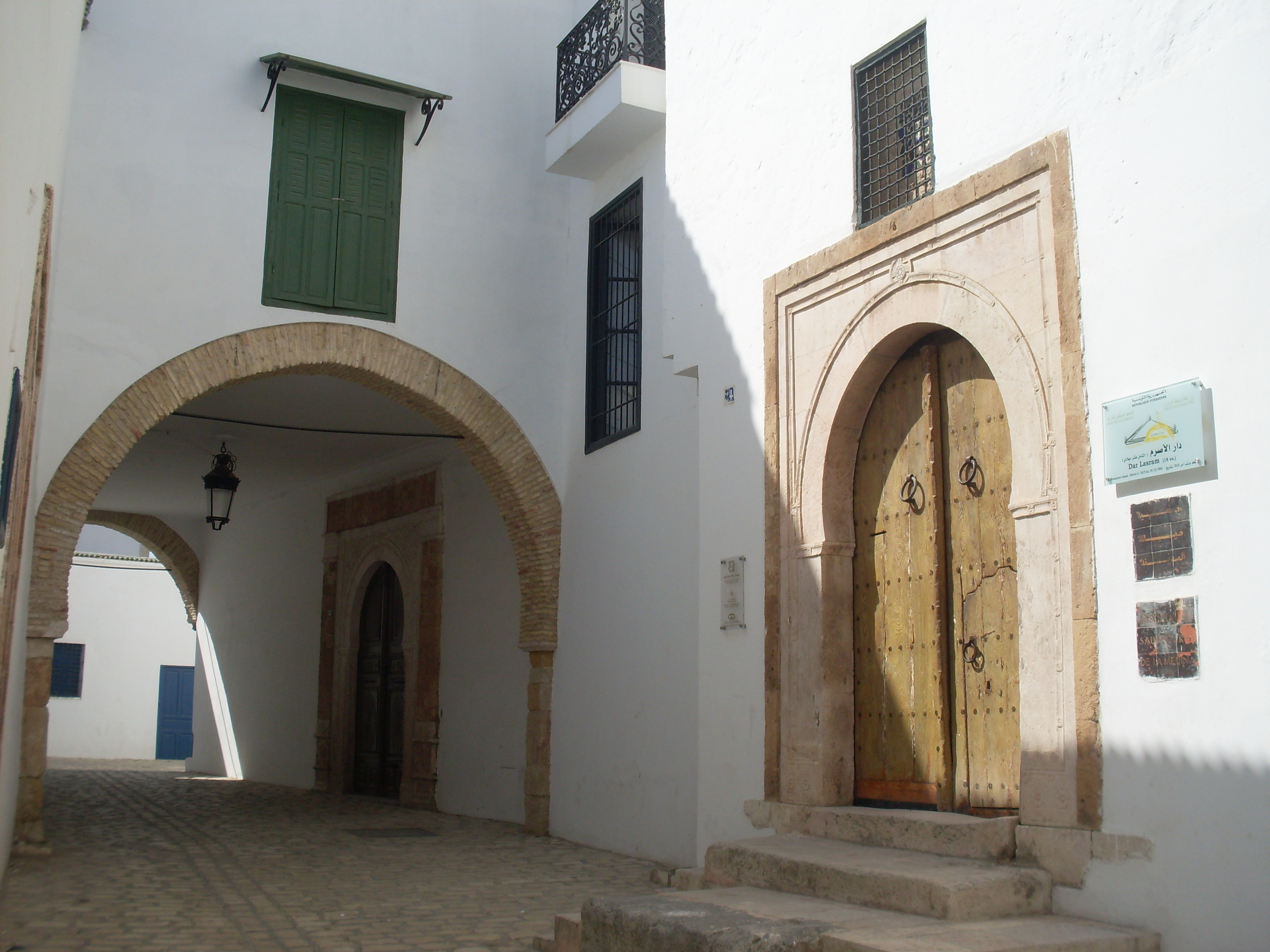
Dar Lasram: headquarters of the association.

The Association was founded in June 1967 by Hassib Ben Ammar who at the time was both the mayor and the regional governor in Tunis. It was born of a belated realization that the historic Medina, despite being a bedrock of local identity, was insufficiently valued, and was threatened by physical degradation or even disappearing. Ben Ammar himself served as president of The Association for two years, until 1969.

The association is financed by the municipality. Since 1968 its offices have been in the Dar Lasram, a small palace in the Medina itself which the municipality purchased in 1964.

== Association presidents since 1967 ==
- 1967-1969 : Hassib Ben Ammar
- 1969-1973 : Fouad Mebazaa
- 1973-1975 : Ezzeddine Abassi
- 1975-1978 : Hassen Memmi
- 1978-1980 : Salah Aouij
- 1980-1986 : Zakaria Ben Mustapha
- 1986-1988 : Mohamed Ali Bouleymane
- 1988-1990 : Ahmed Belkhodja
- 1990-2000 : Mohamed Ali Bouleymane
- 2000–present : Abbès Mohsen
