= Dar Al Jaziri =

Palace in Tunis

Coordinates: 36.8023°N 10.1682°E

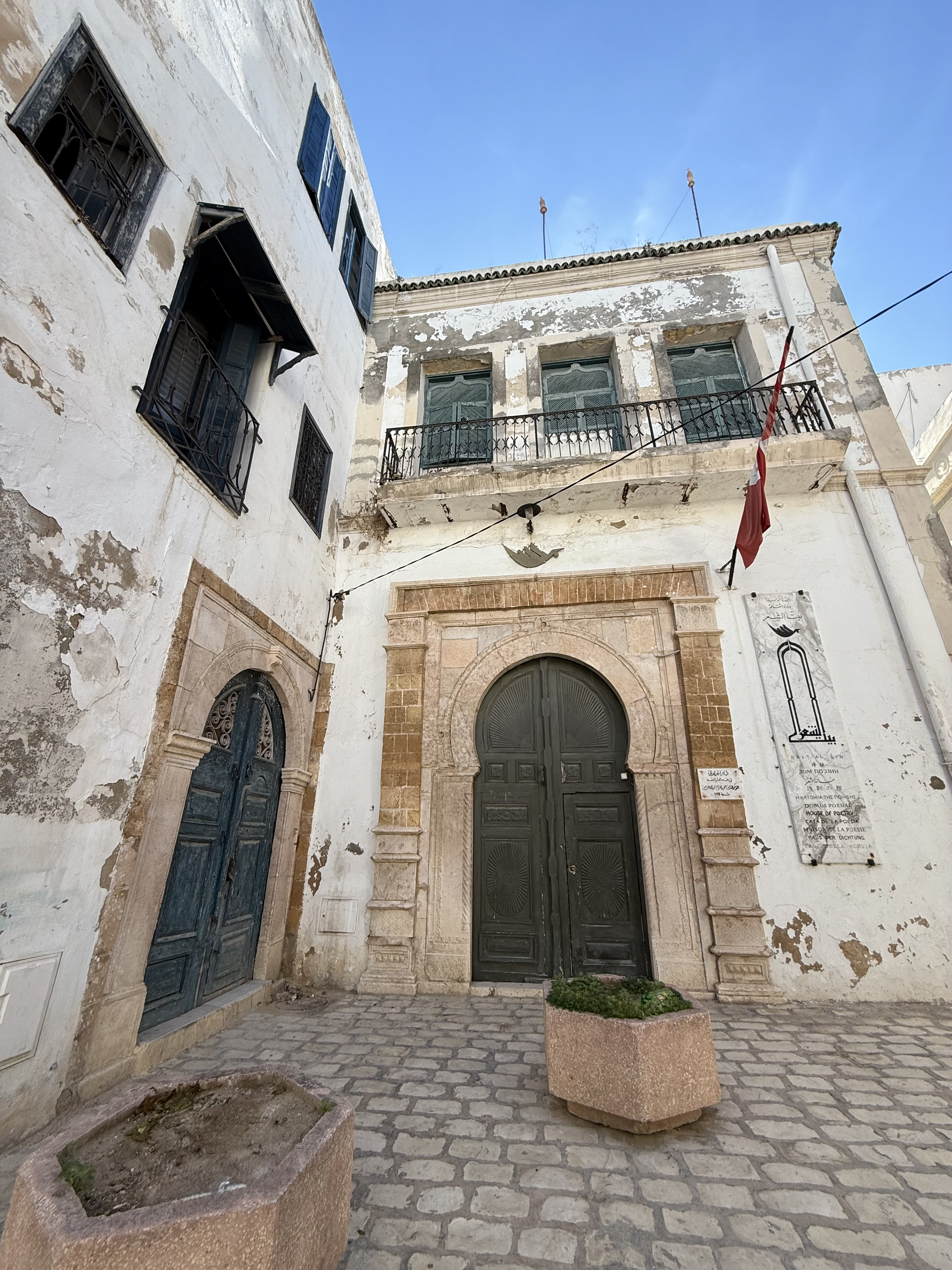
Facade of Dar Al Jaziri

Dar Al Jaziri (Arabic: دار الجزيري) is a palace in the medina of Tunis. Located in the Tribunal Street, a few meters from Dar Lasram, it was one of the residences of the Jaziri family between the 12th and 18th centuries.

In 1937, it housed the second Neo Destour congress. Listed as an historical building in 1992, it is nowadays the seat of the House of Poetry.

Near the palace stands the family mausoleum known as Tourbet Al Jaziri, its door opening in front of Dar Lasram.

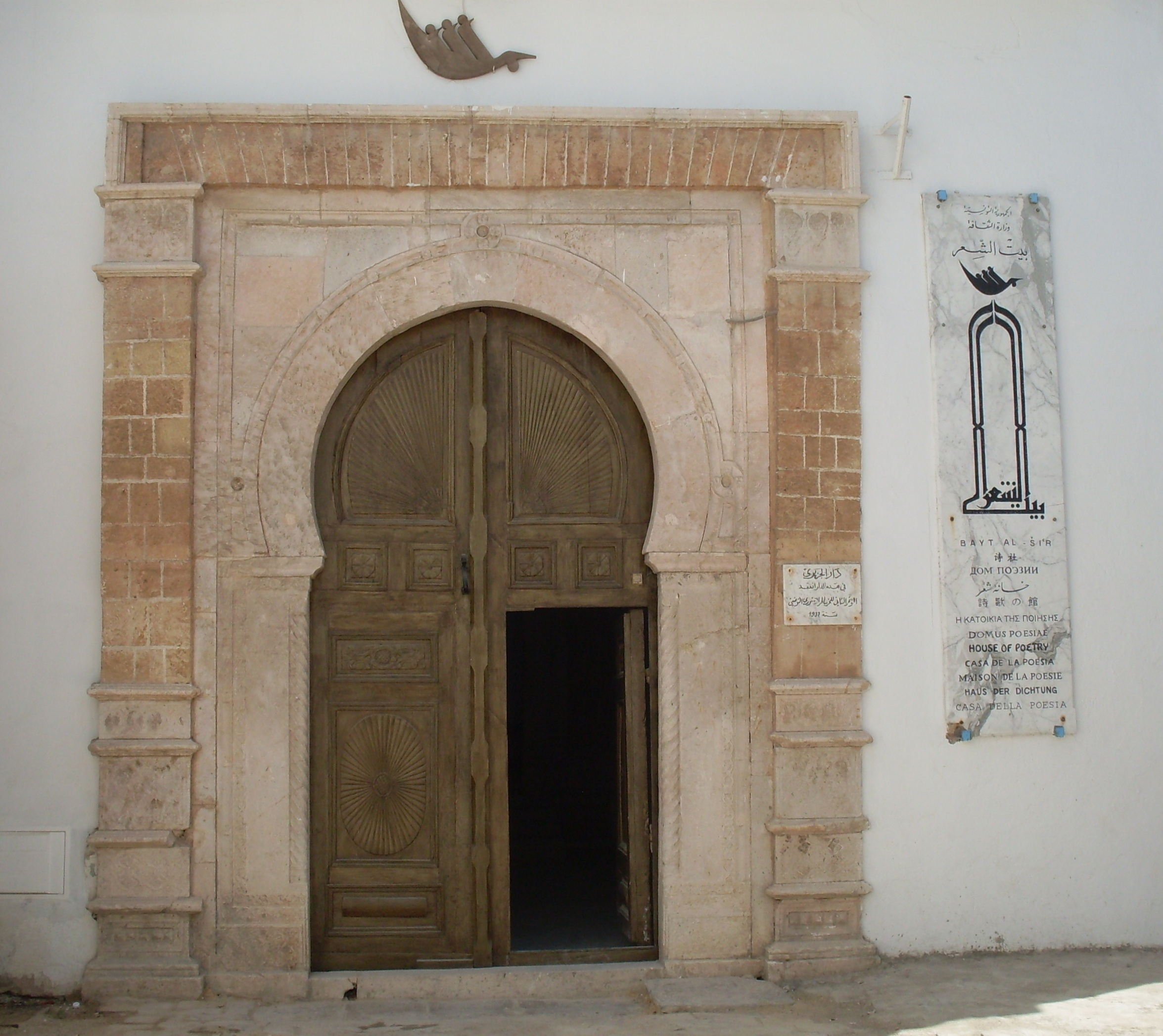
Door of Al Jaziri

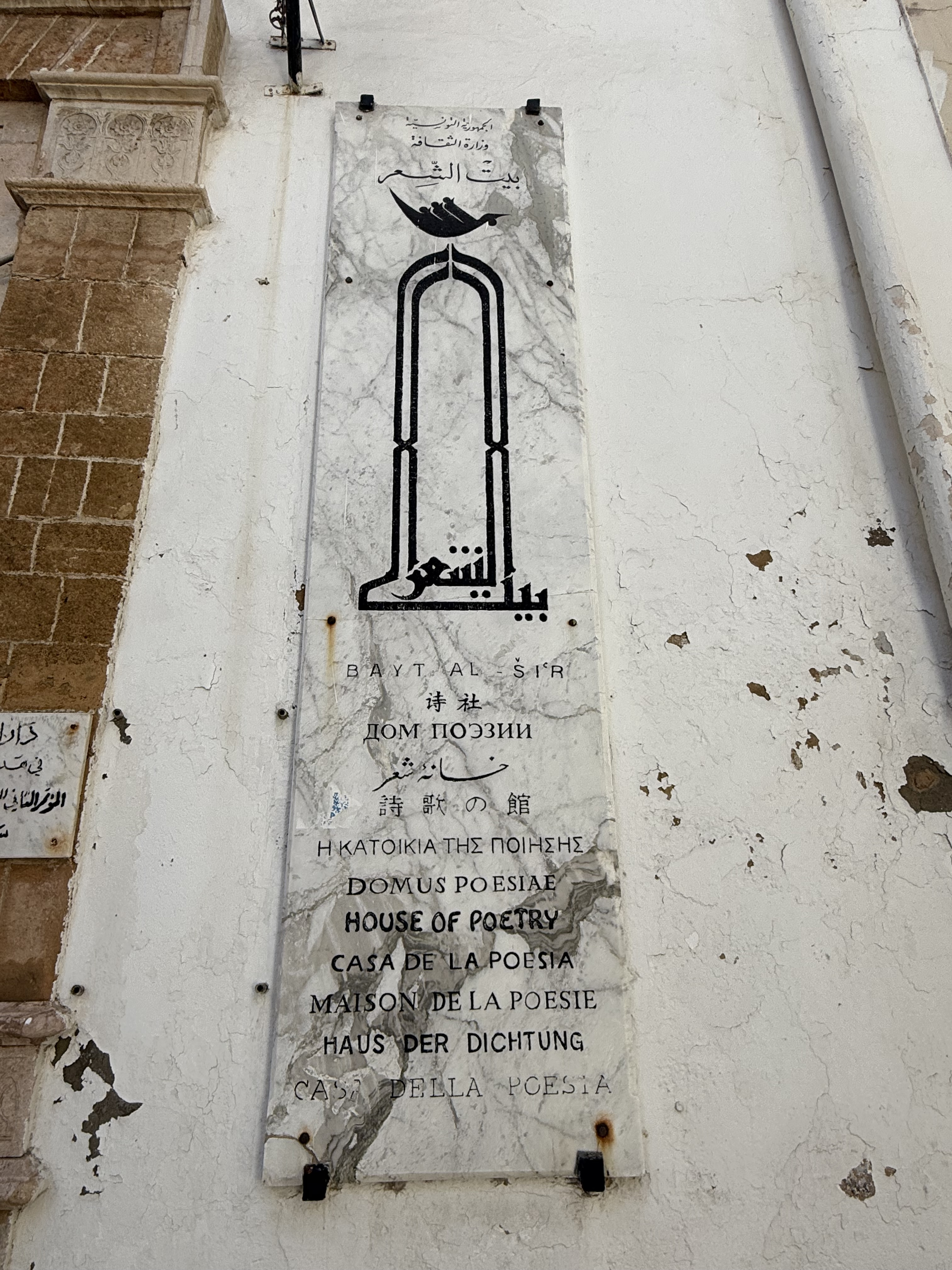
Tribunal Street

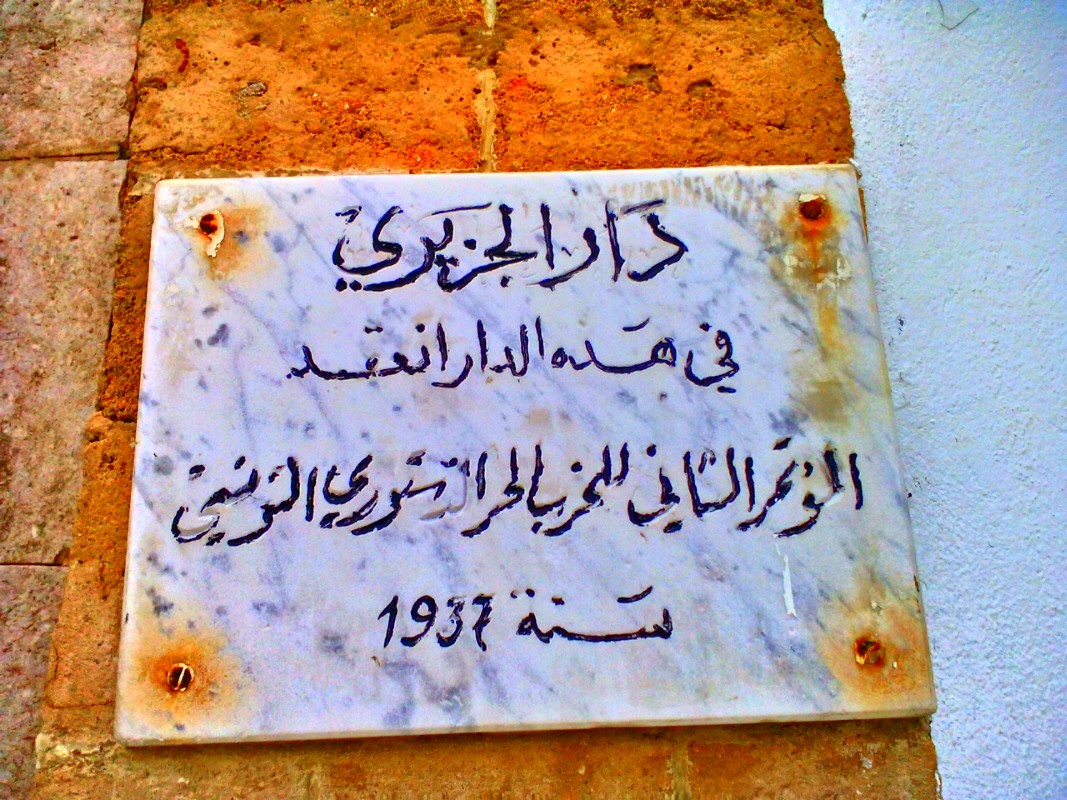
Commemorative plaque of Dar Al Jaziri

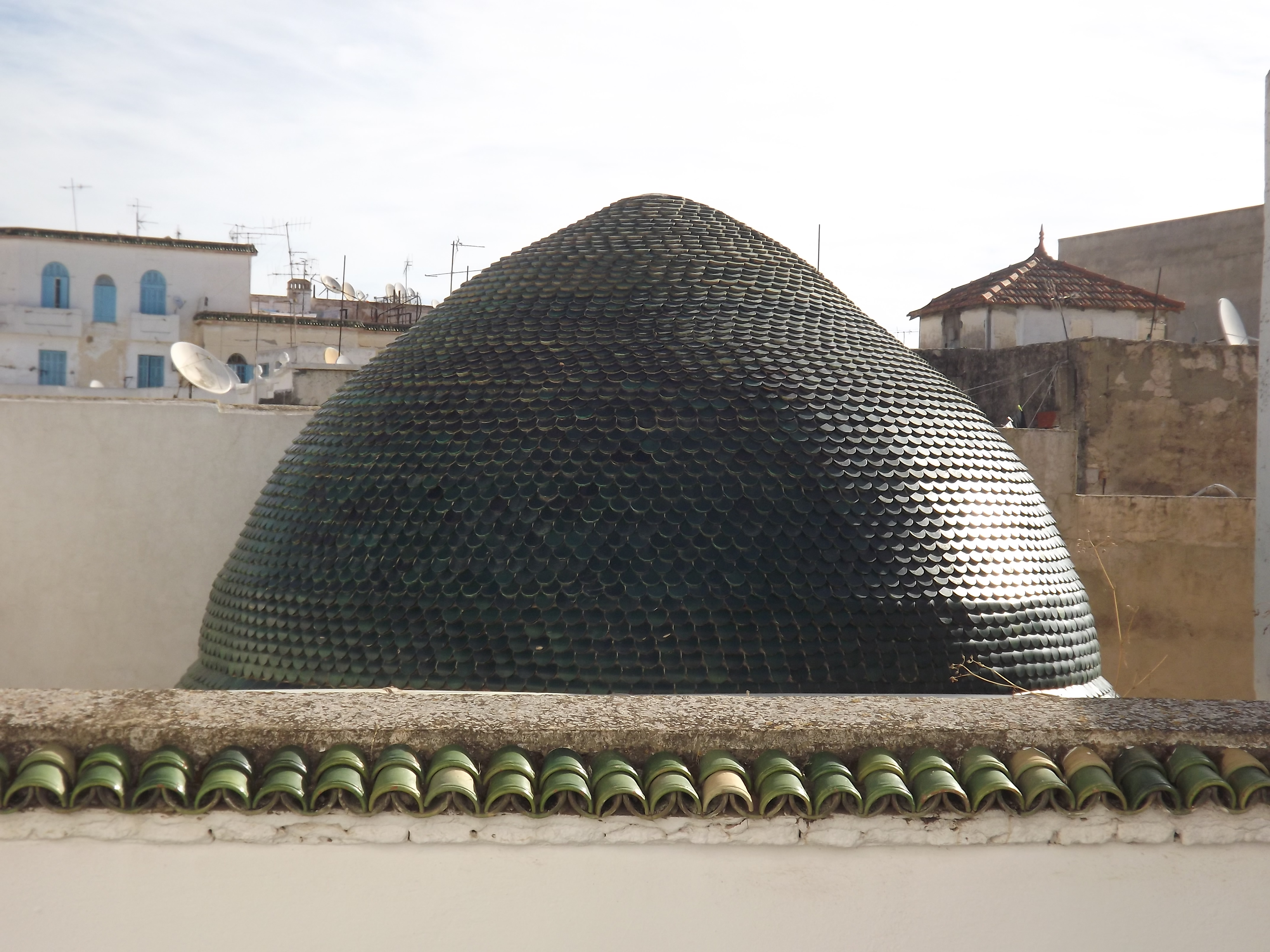
Dome of Tourbet Al Jaziri

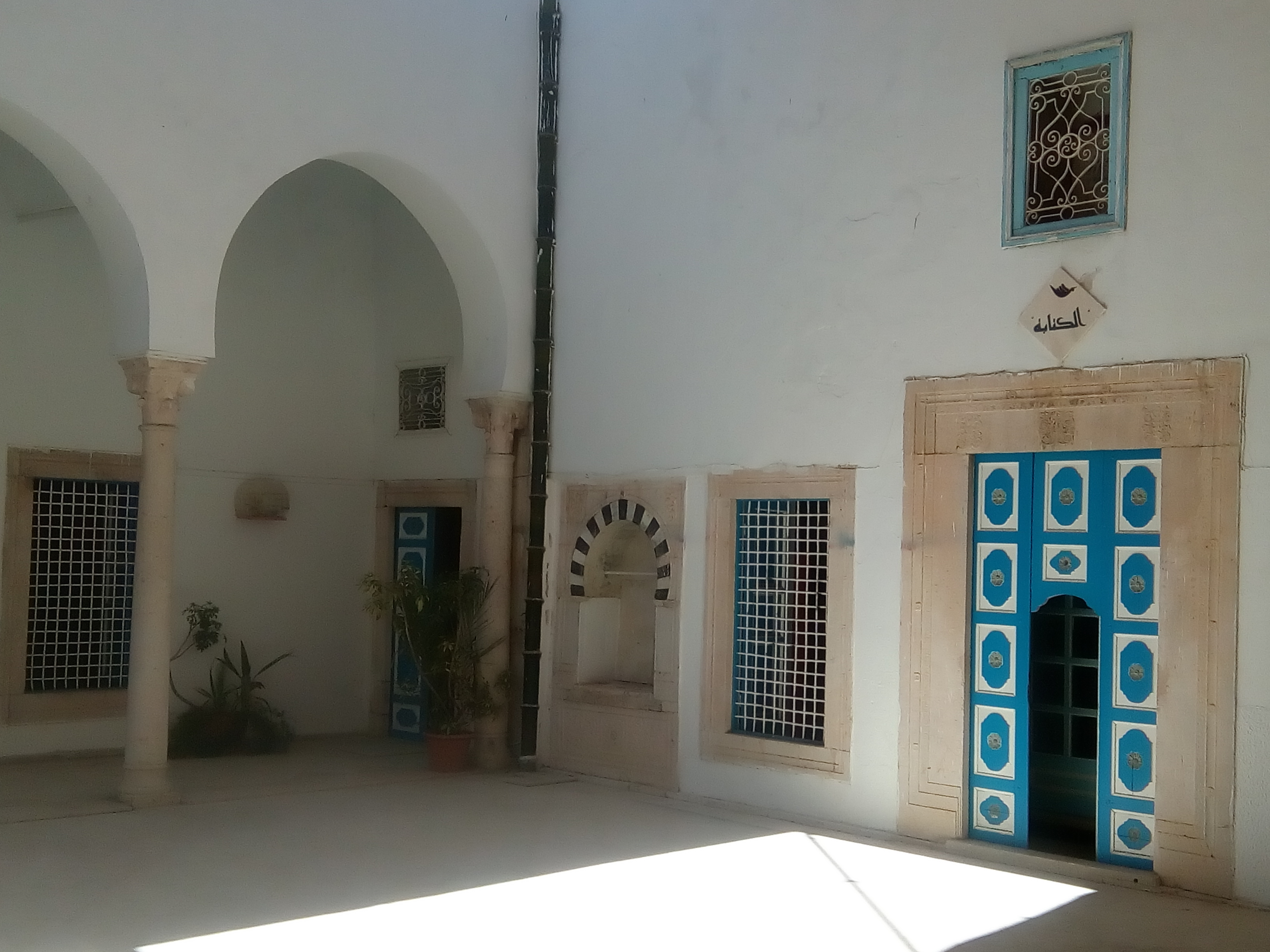
Hall of Dar Al Jaziri
