= Aleksandr Dereven =

Russian handball player

Personal information
- Nationality: Russian
- Born: 26 March 1992 (age 34) Tolyatti, Russia
- Height: 1.98 m (6 ft 6 in)

Sport
- Sport: Handball
- Position: Left back

Senior clubs
- Years: Team
- 2012–2015: Chekhovskiye Medvedi
- 2015–2017: RK Vardar
- 2017–2021: HBC CSKA Moscow
National team
Years	Team	Apps	(Gls)
–	Russia	30	(59)

Aleksandr Yuryevich Dereven (Russian: Александр Юрьевич Деревень; born 26 March 1992) is a former Russian handball player for the Russian national team.

He participated at the 2015 World Men's Handball Championship in Qatar.

== Club career ==
Dereven played for Chekhovskiye Medvedi from 2012 to 2015, where he won the Russian championship in 2013, 2014 and 2015. He then joined Macedonian RK Vardar Skopje. Here he won the Macedonian double in 2016 and 2017 and the EHF Champions League in 2017.

In 2017 he returned to Russia and joined HBC CSKA Moscow.

== Accomplishments ==
- Russian Handball League: 2013, 2014, 2015
- Macedonian Handball Super League: 2016, 2017
- Handball Cup of North Macedonia: 2016, 2017
- EHF Champions League: 2017
