= Dar Lasram =

Coordinates: 36.8021°N 10.1681°E

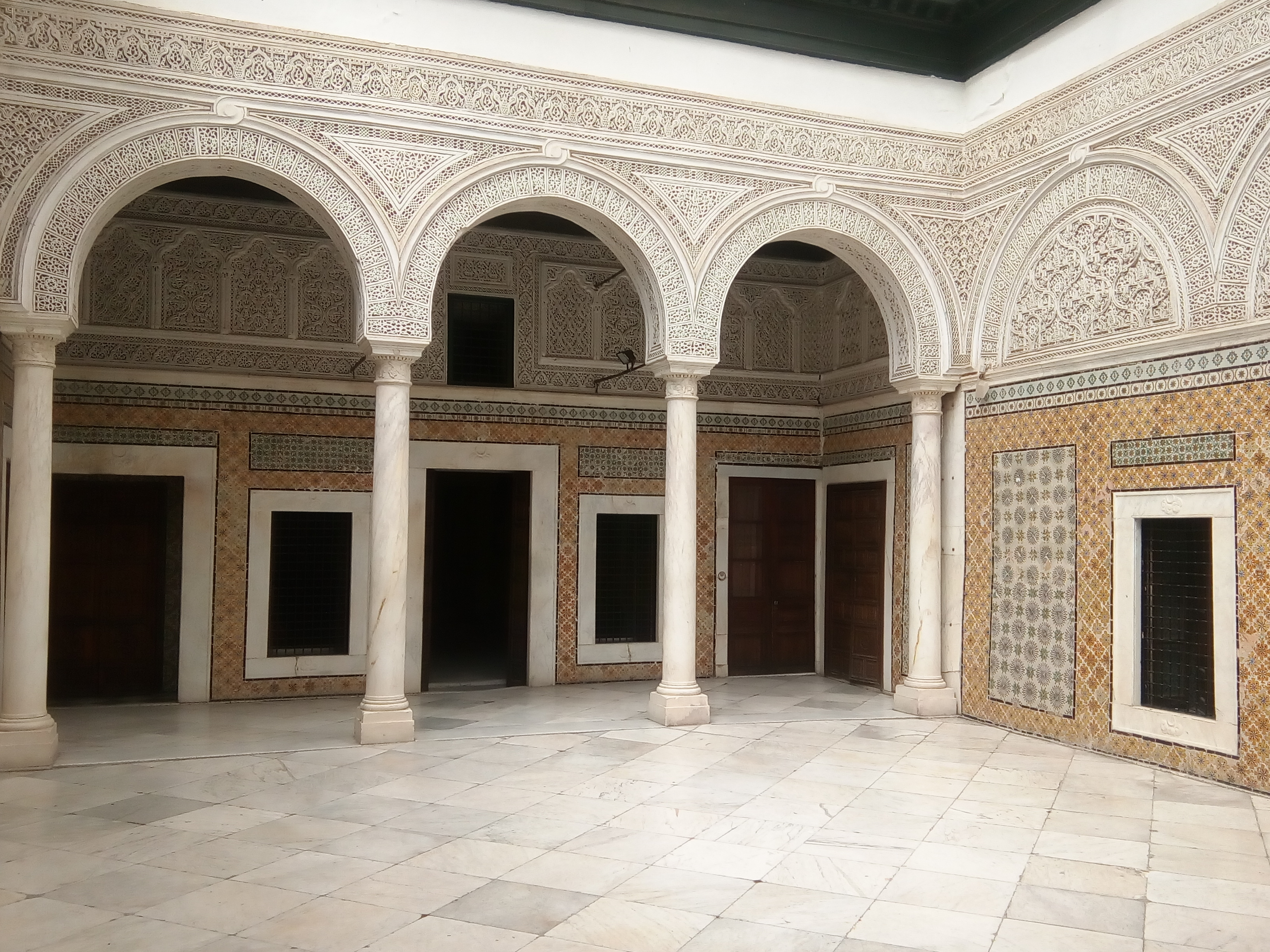
- Courtyard of Dar Lasram
- Interactive map of the Dar Lasram area

General information
- Type: Palace
- Architectural style: Moorish architecture Tunisian architecture
- Location: Medina of Tunis, Tunisia
- Year built: 1812
- Client: Hamouda Lasram

Dar Lasram is one of the palaces of the medina of Tunis. It is located at 24 Tribunal Street.

== History ==
The Lasram's, an aristocratic family of Tunis, descend from a Yemeni tribe settled in Kairouan. It is composed of rich landowners. Most of them were ministers of the Pen (Arabic: وزارة القلم, French: ministres de la Plume). One of them, Hamouda Lasram, is a rich landowner and a khawaja of the Igawawen tribe (secretary of Berber cavalry regiments).

In order to get a large plot and build the palace, he acquired and demolished several neighboring buildings. Its construction lasted from 1812 to 1819.

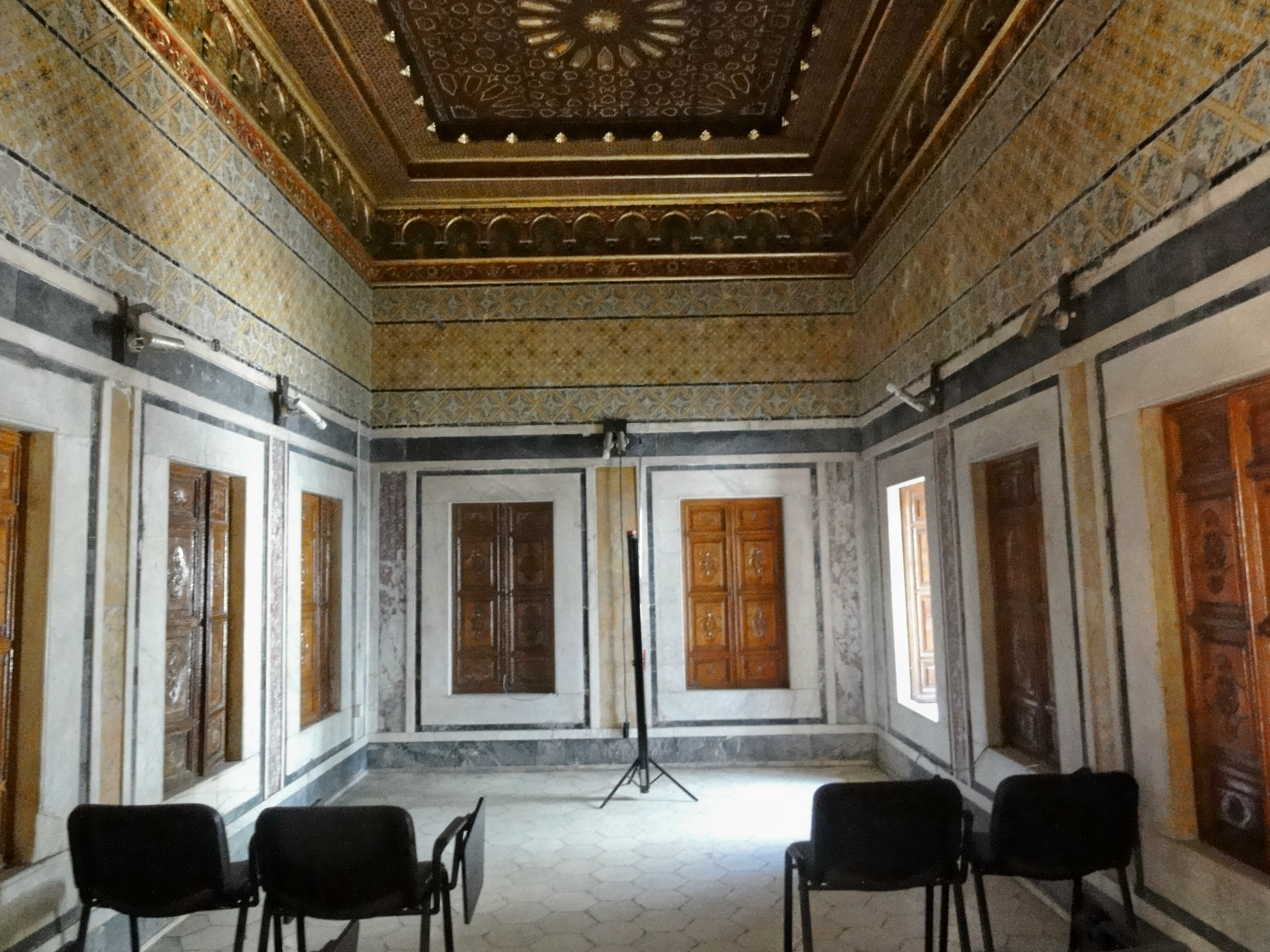
A room of Dar Lasram

Until the independence and the abolition of the habous, his descendants lived in the palace (which was considered inalienable as a habous).

In 1964, the municipality of Tunis acquired it. Four years later, in 1968, it is allocated to the Association de sauvegarde de la médina de Tunis.

== Architecture ==
Dar Lasram, with a surface area of 2250 m^{2}, is a good example of a large traditional Tunisian residence. The ground floor contains the warehouse and the service area, the first floor is reserved to family members while the upper floor is reserved to guests.

Nowadays, the palace is divided between the Association de sauvegarde de la médina and the Tahar Haddad Club.

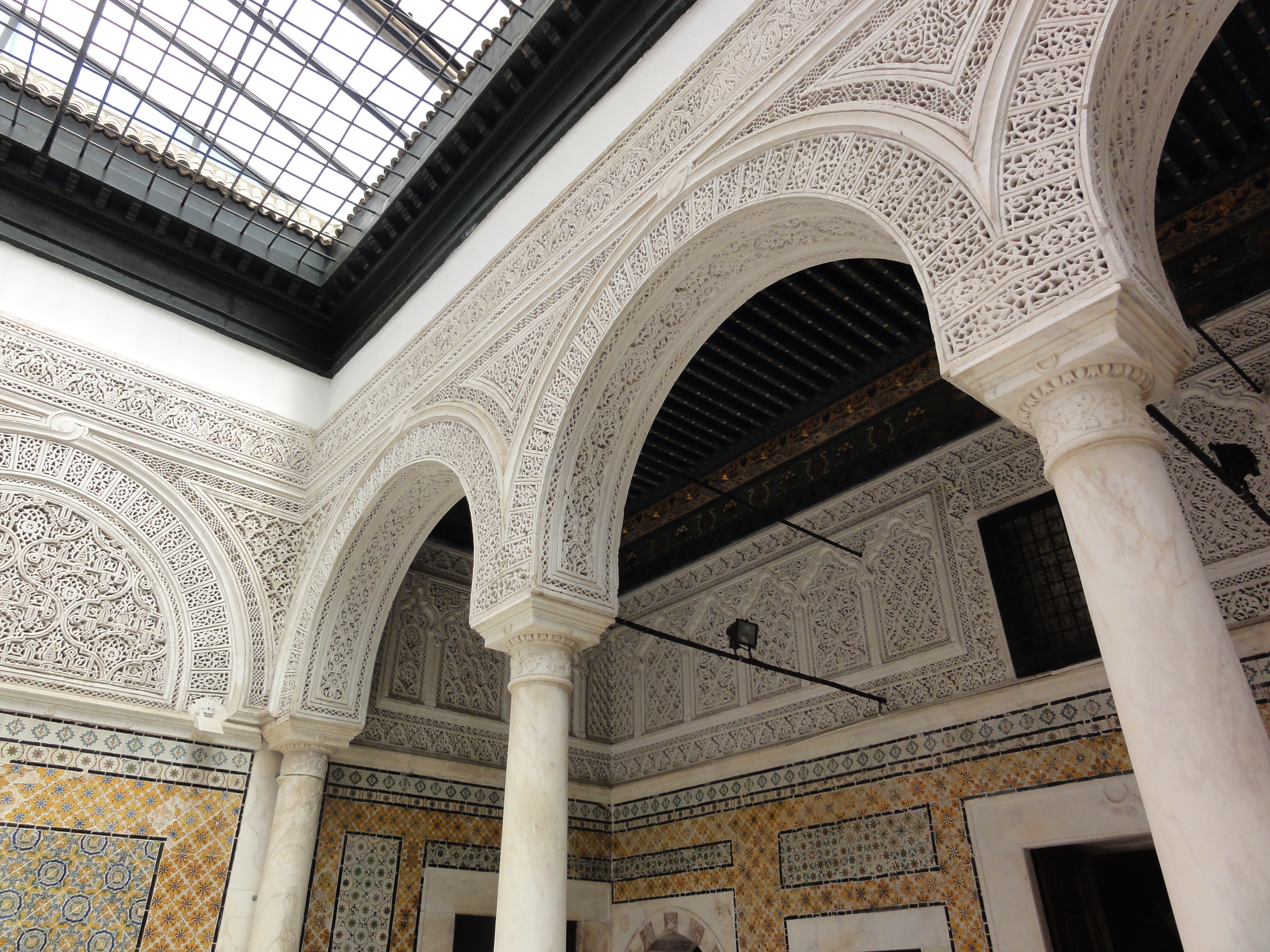
Detail of the Arches of the Dar Lasram Patio

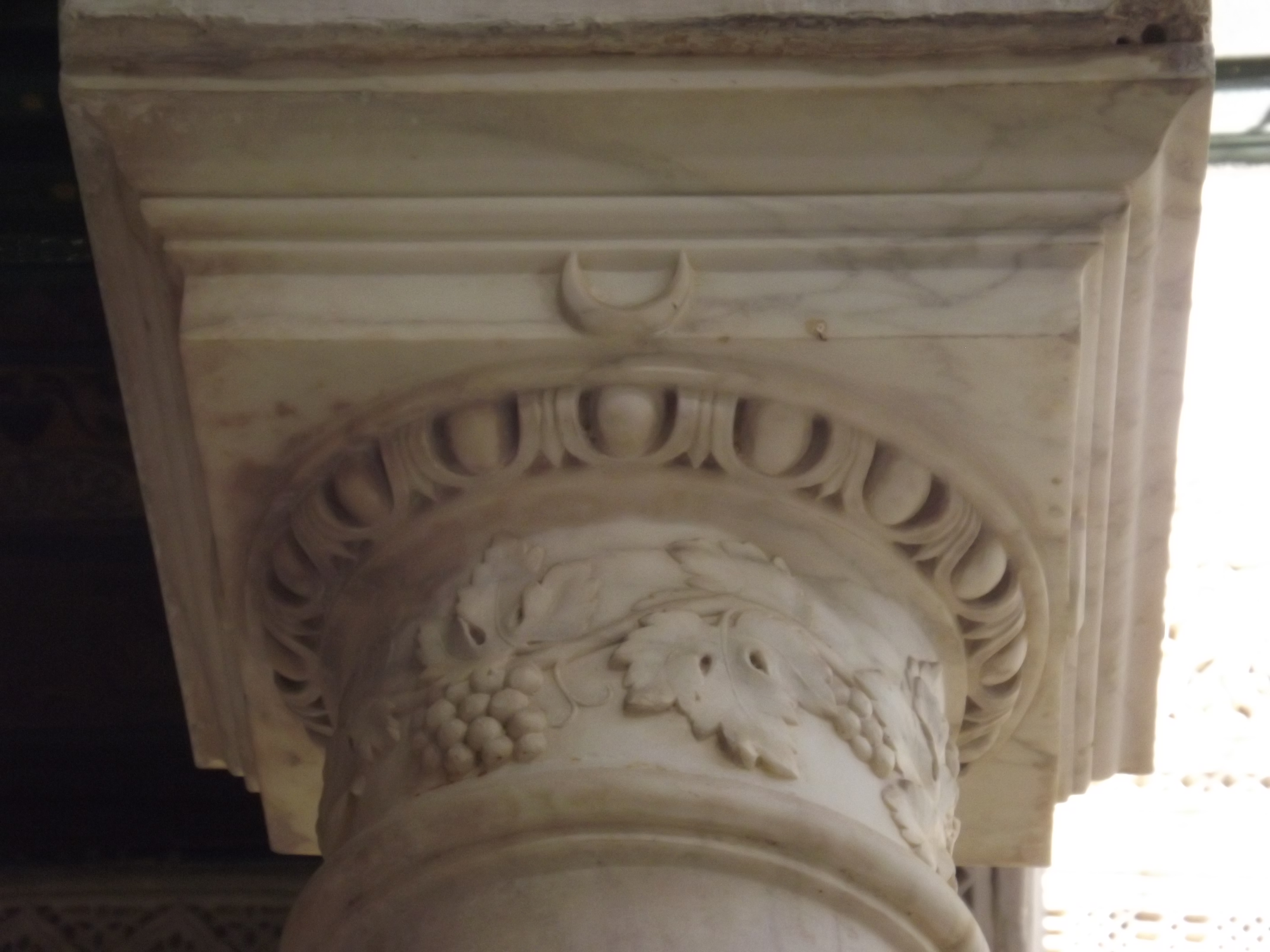
Close-up of a Neo-doric capital of the main patio

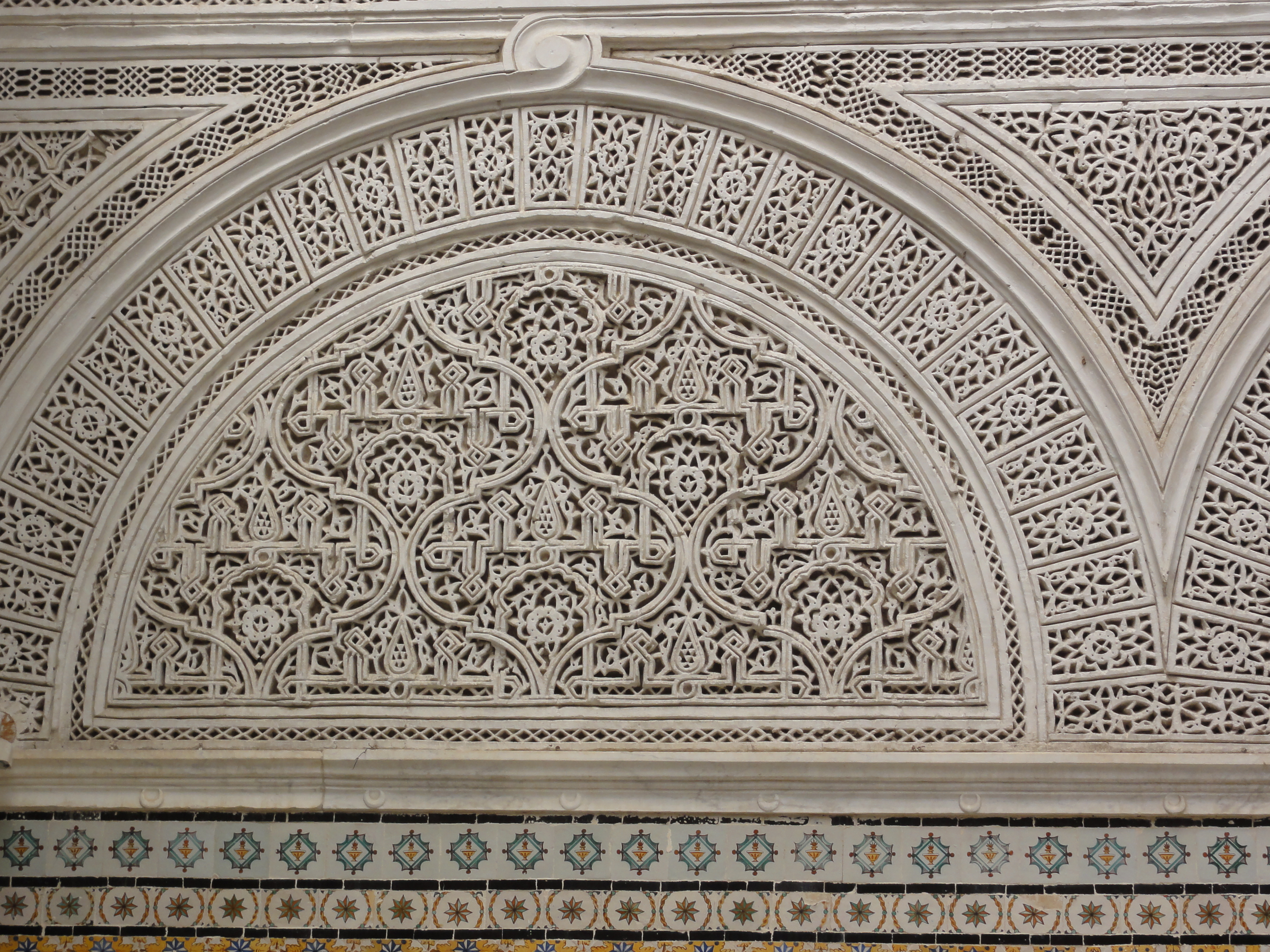
Close-up of a stucco-work in the main patio

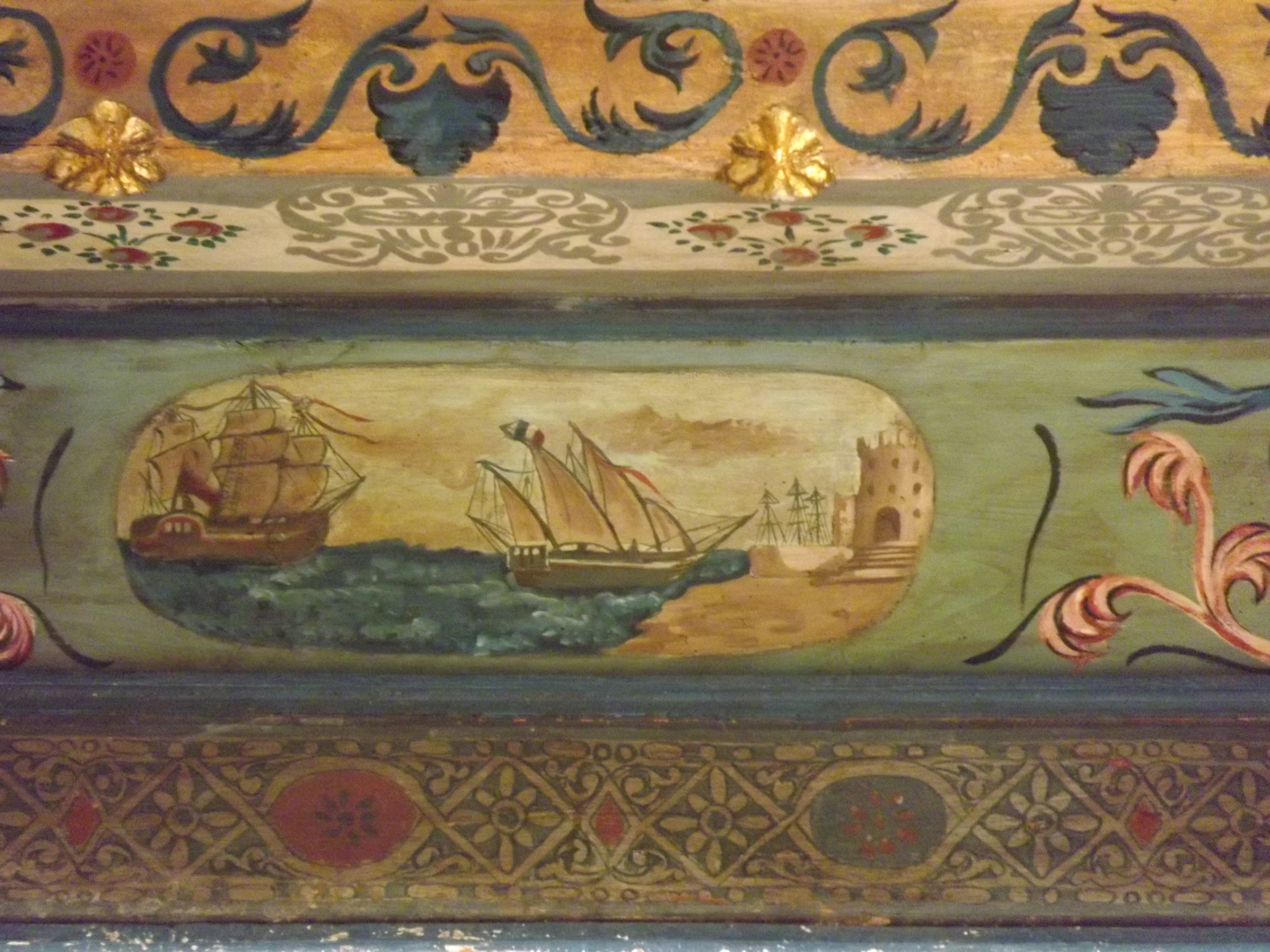
Painted decoration in the ceiling of one of the patio's porticoes

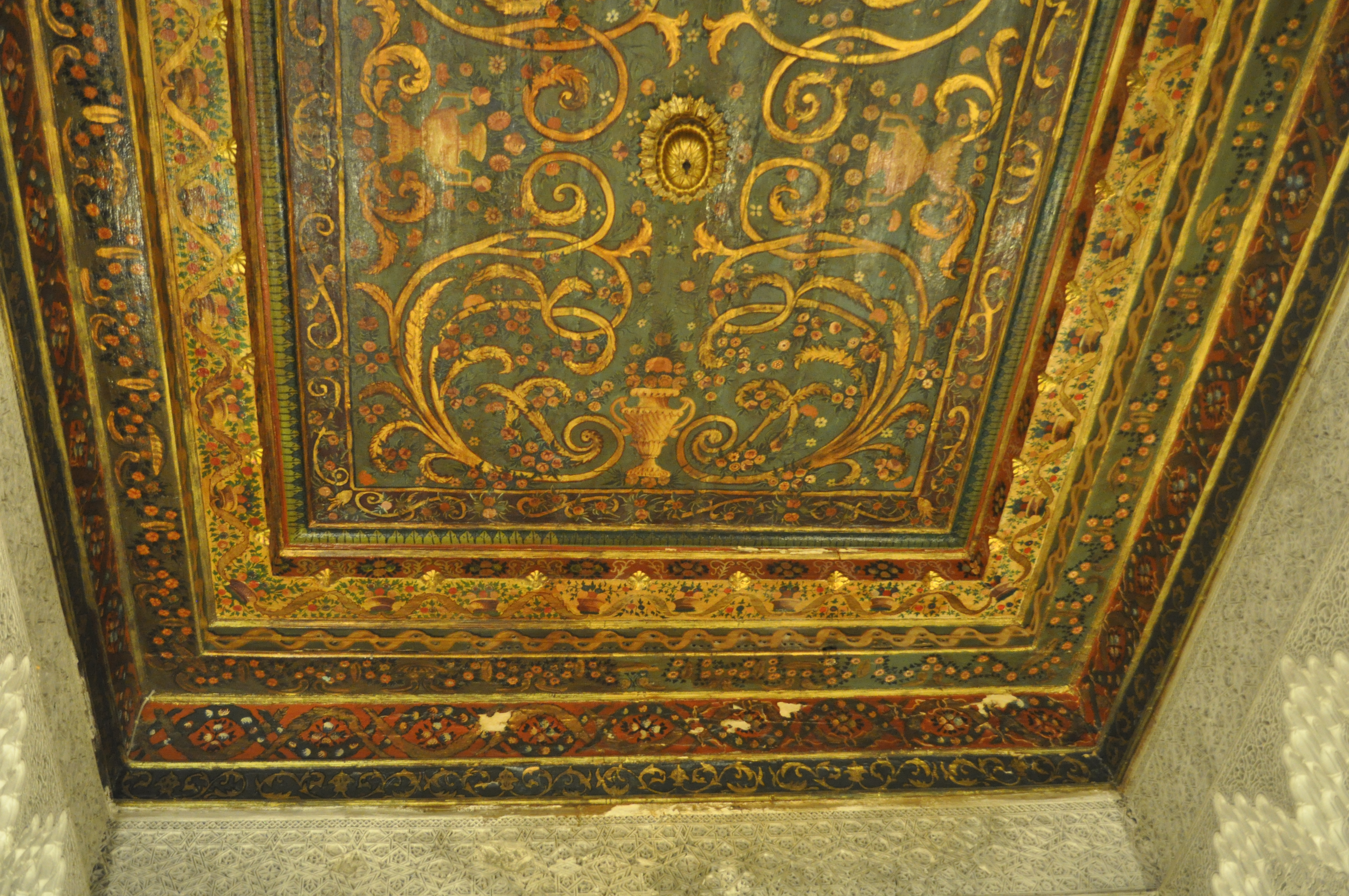
View of a painted ceiling with vegetal arabesque ornament

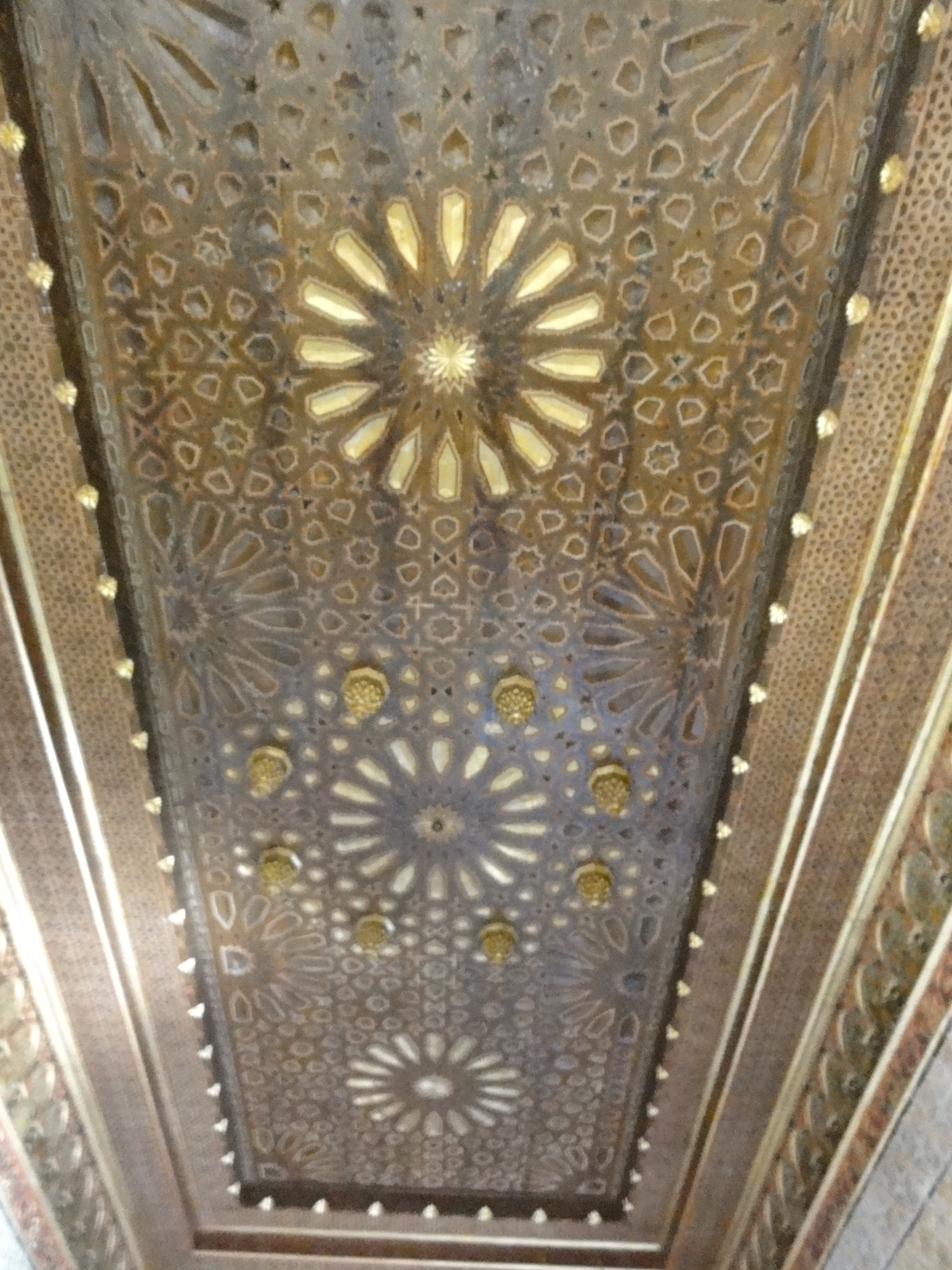
View a ceiling sculpted with roses and geometrical frames

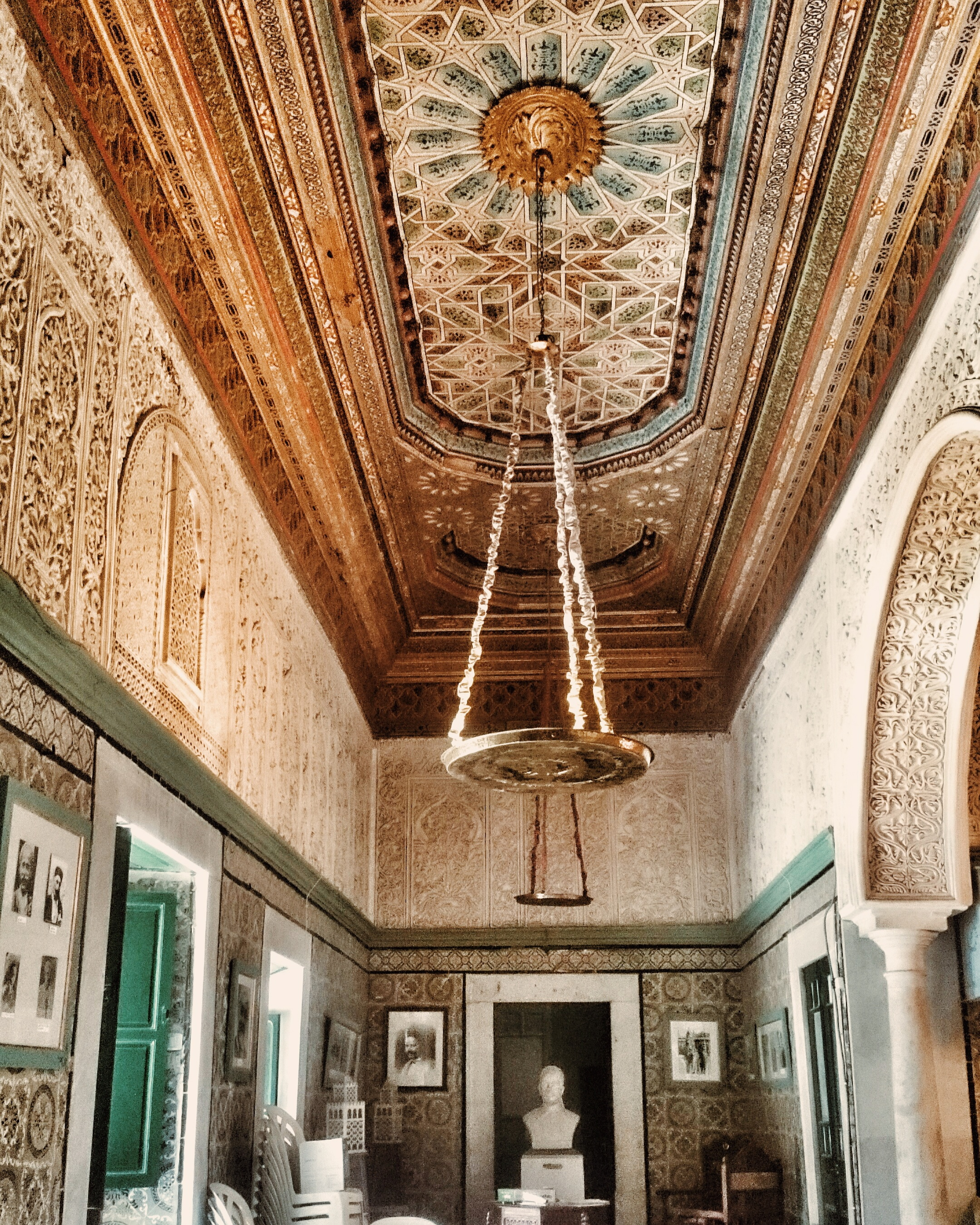
A Room in Dar Lasram
