= Abbès Mohsen =

Tunisian politician

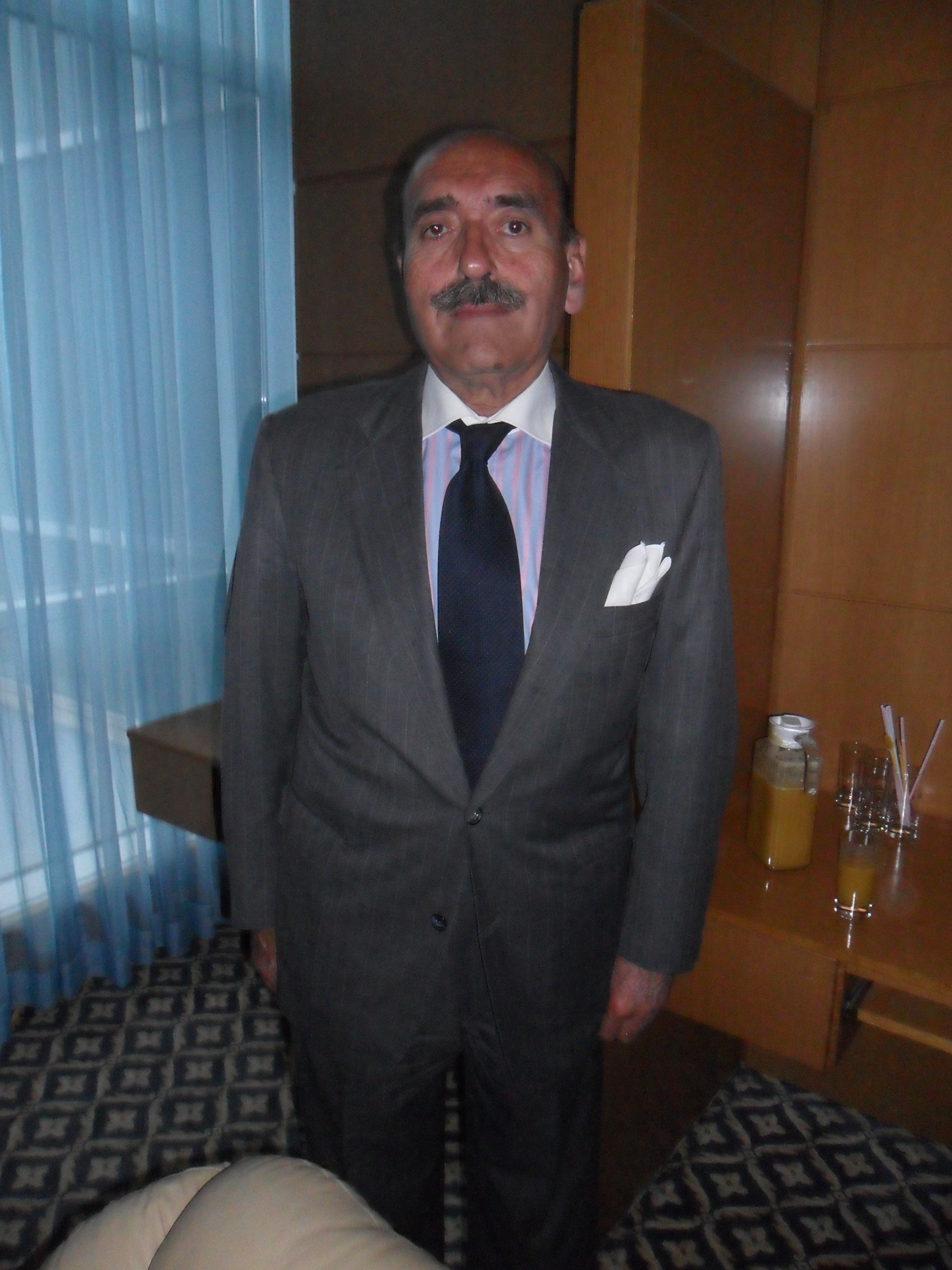

Mayor of Tunis
- In office 2000–2010
- Preceded by: Mohamed Ali Bouleymane
- Succeeded by: Mohamed Béji Ben Mami

Provincial governor (Tunis region) 1st period
- In office March 1978 – May 1980

Provincial governor (Tunis region) 2nd period
- In office December 1986 – June 1988

Tunisian Ambassador to Yemen
- In office 1992–1995

Tunisian Ambassador to Brazil
- In office 1997–2000

Tunisian Ambassador to the Netherlands
- In office 2010–2011

Personal details
- Born: 25 October 1945 (age 81) Tunis
- Party: RCD
- Spouse: Y
- Children: 3s

Abbès Mohsen (born 25 October 1945) is a Tunisian politician.

Between 2008 and 2011 he was a member of his country's ruling Democratic Constitutional Rally (RCD / Rassemblement constitutionnel démocratique) (political party) Central Committee. He has also served, between 2000 and 2010, as the Mayor of Tunis.

Since the Tunisian Revolution of 2010/2011 Mohsen has attempted to continue with his public career, although membership of the Tunis political establishment under the previous regime has given rise to some political hostility.

== Biography ==
=== Family background ===
Abbès Mohsen was born into a leading Tunisian family of Cherif provenance, which has also provided a line of imams to Al-Zaytuna Mosque. He is son to Zine el-Abidine Mohsen, Qaid-governor and himself son of Grand Imam Mahmoud Mohsen and of Zohra, daughter of Habib Djellouli, a leading politician in Tunisia during the middle years of the 20th century.

=== Early years ===
He obtained his Baccalauréat at the Lycée Francais de Mutuelleville (as it was then known). He is a qualified lawyer and an alumnus of the Tunisian ENA (École nationale d'administration). At the age of just 30 he became the first governor of Bizerte and then, in 1976, the youngest ever governor of Nabeul (le Cap Bon).

=== Political career ===
Mohsen became governor-president for the important Tunis district in 1978. Two years later he was appointed Special Advisor to the First Minister. In 1981 he was appointed head of the Tunisian Hotels and Tourism association. In 1983 he became Director General for Local Collectives at the Tunisian Interior Ministry and then in 1986, for a second stint, governor-president for the Tunis district.

During the later 1980s his career increasingly took him into national politics. He was appointed Director General of Protocol to the President in 1988 and Project Leader for the Interior Ministry the following year, responsible for conferences at the ENA between 1989 and 1992. In 1992 he was sent to Yemen as his country's ambassador, returning, after three years in 1995. He now became permanent secretary to the country's ruling Democratic Constitutional Rally (RCD party / Rassemblement constitutionnel démocratique), a position he retained till 1997 when he accepted a post as the Tunisian ambassador to Brazil.

In 2000 he was appointed Mayor of Tunis by decree: he was reappointed to the post in May 2005 on the basis of municipal elections. During this period he became secretary general of the International Association of Francophone Mayors. At the turbulent RCD Party Congress in July/August 2008 he became a member of the Party Central Committee. On 11 January 2010 the president sacked Mohsen as mayor of Tunis and he was replaced by Mohamed Béji Ben Mami who was already a member of the city council. The official Tunis Africa Press agency report gave no explanation for the sacking, but press speculation elsewhere indicated that it resulted from a refusal by Mohsen to reply to journalists from the Tuinisian Channel 7 television programme El Hak Maâk who had asked about a litigation involving municipal service provision.

Abbès Mohsen received a further ambassadorial appointment, this time as theTunisian ambassador to the Netherlands, on 27 October 2010.

On 28 August 2014 his name was at the top of a unified candidate list issued by the Destourian Movement and the National Destourian Initiative - effectively an update and relaunch by elements of the old centrist RCD party - to contest First electoral district of Tunis in the Legislative election of October 2014. The former Destourians came ninth in the election, with a vote share that entitled them to three seats in the national legislative assembly.

== Recognition ==
Abbès Mohsen has received numerous awards and honours during his career. These include the Order of Independence and the Order of the Republic. Beyond Tunisia his various awards include the Grand Cross of the order of Brasilia and the Grand Cross of the Order of Rio Branco. He is a commander of the Legion of Honour and of the Order of Merit in Italy.

== Publications ==
- Servir, mémoires désabusés d'un commis de l'État. Tunisie 1971-2011, Paris, ed. Sand & Tchou, 2012
- Les Gouverneurs, Tunis, ed. Cérès, 2016
- La transition immobile. Chronique d’un échec, Tunis, ed. La Maison du Livre, 2021
