= Tarak Jallouz =

Tunisian handball player

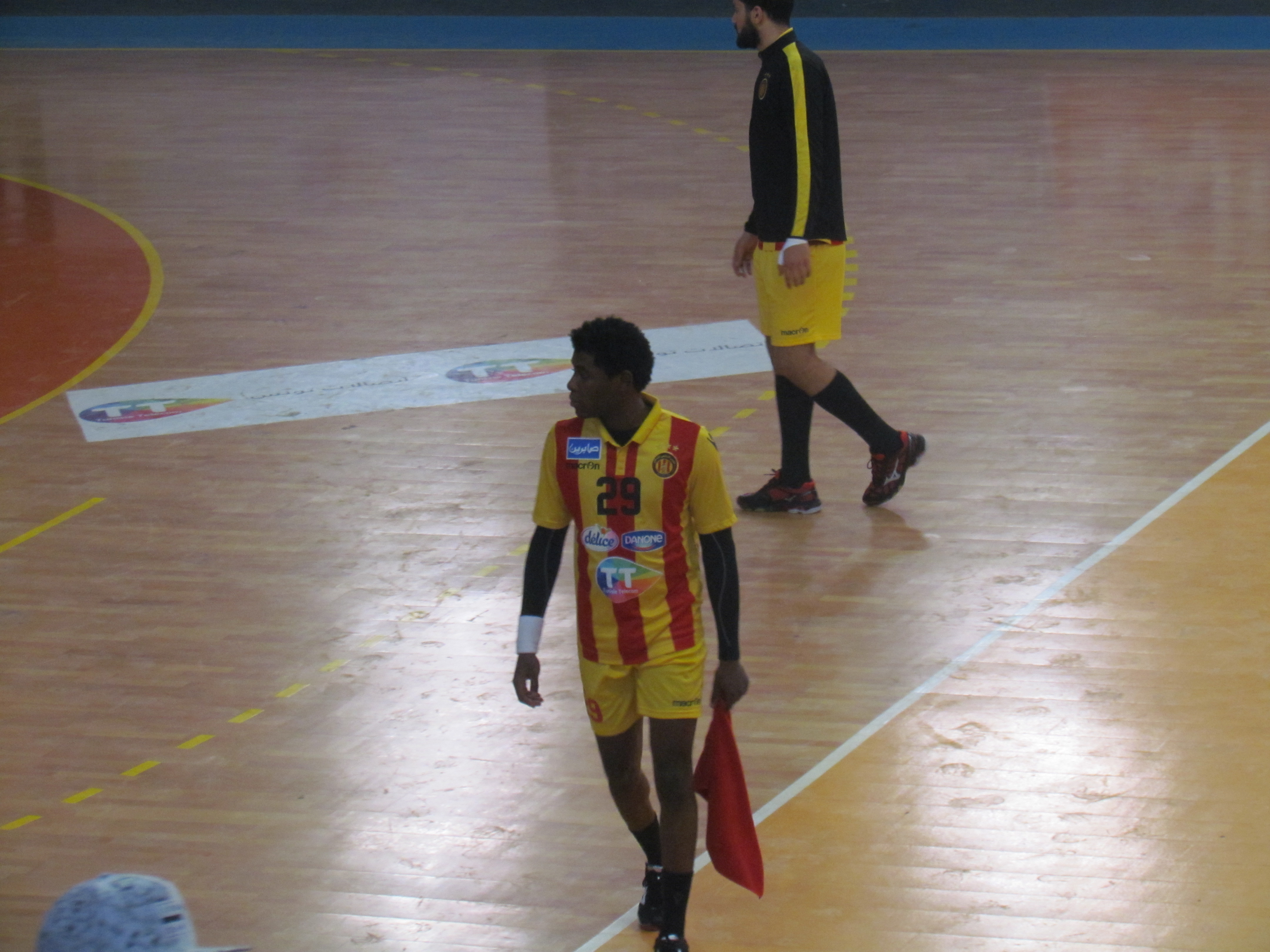

Personal information
- Nationality: Tunisian
- Born: 1 November 1993 (age 32) Hammamet, Tunisia
- Height: 1.85 m (6 ft 1 in)

Sport
- Sport: Handball
- Position: Right wing
- Current club: Espérance de Tunis
- Number: 29

Senior clubs
- Years: Team
- -2014: AS Hammamet
- 2014-: Espérance de Tunis
National team
| Years | Team | Apps | (Gls) |
| – | Tunisia | 1 | (0) |

Tarak Jallouz (born 1 November 1993) is a Tunisian handball player for Espérance de Tunis and the Tunisian national team.

He participated at the 2017 World Men's Handball Championship.
