= Oussama Jaziri =

Tunisian handball player (born 1992)

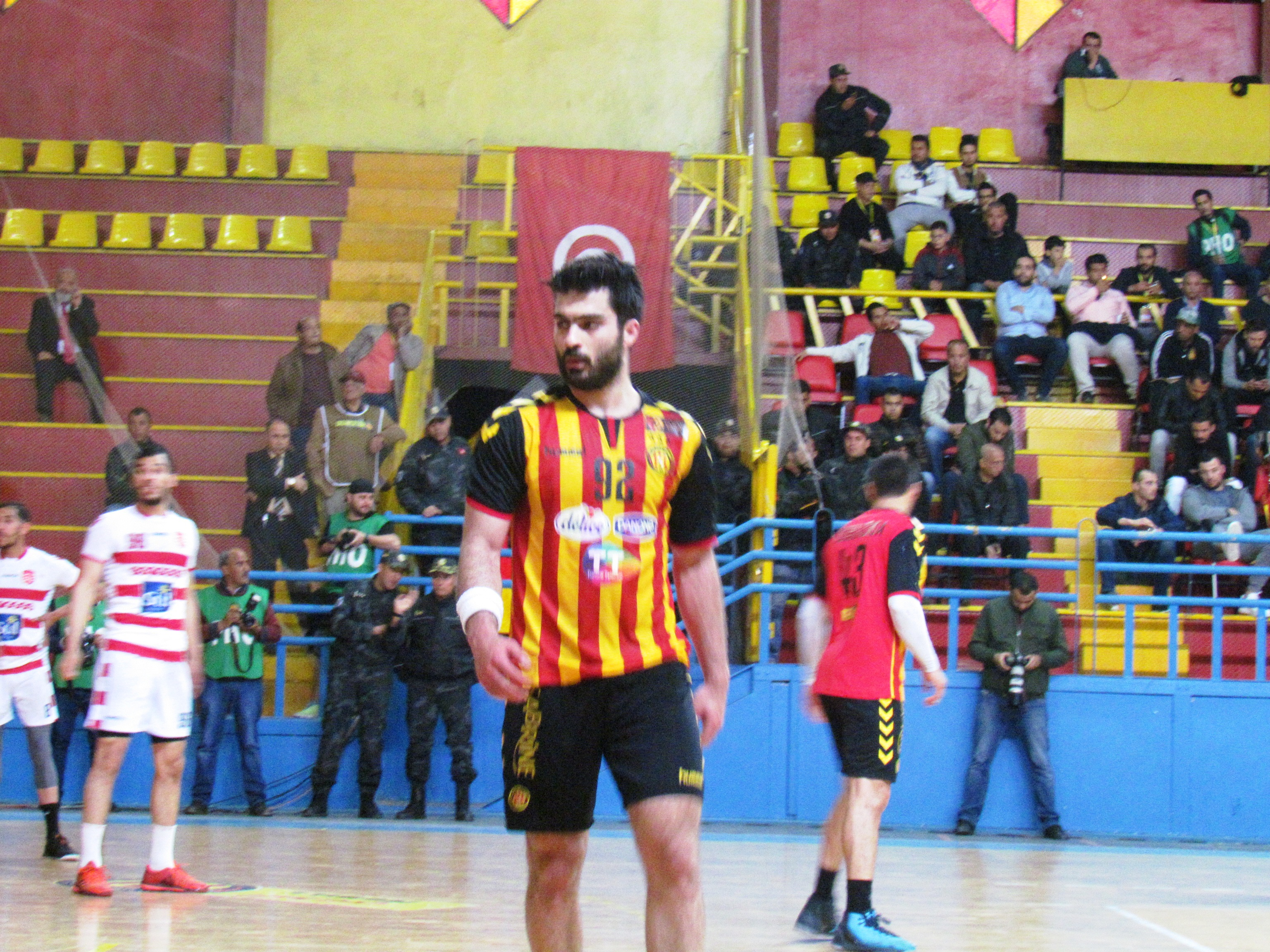

Personal information
- Nationality: Tunisian
- Born: 6 November 1992 (age 33) Hammamet, Tunisia
- Height: 1.91 m (6 ft 3 in)

Sport
- Sport: Handball
- Position: Left back
- Current club: Al Ahly SC
- Number: 92

Senior clubs
- Years: Team
- –2015: AS Hammamet
- 2015–2020: ES Tunis
- 2020–: Al Ahly SC
National team
Years	Team	Apps	(Gls)
2016–	Tunisia	27	(39)
Medal record
African Championship
Silver medal – second place	2020 Tunisia

Oussama Jaziri (born 6 November 1992) is a Tunisian handball player for Al Ahly and the Tunisian national team.

He represented Tunisia at the 2019 World Men's Handball Championship.
