= 2026 Buenos Aires P1 =

Premier Padel tournament held in Buenos Aires

- Date: 10 – 17 May
- Edition: 2nd
- Category: P1
- Prize money: €479.068
- Location: Buenos Aires, Argentina
- Venue: Estadio Parque Roca
- Court speed: Slow

Champions
- Men's doubles: (Spain) Alejandro Galán (Argentina) Federico Chingotto
- Women's doubles: (Spain) Bea González (Spain) Paula Josemaría

Chronology

The 2026 Buenos Aires P1 (officially 2026 Premier Padel Buenos Aires P1) was the eight tournament of the fifth season organized by Premier Padel, the premier padel circuit, promoted by the International Padel Federation, and with the financial backing of Nasser Al-Khelaïfi's Qatar Sports Investments.

In the women's category, the two highest-ranked pairs on the FIP rankings reached the final, facing each other in the title match for the sixth consecutive tournament. In the decisive match, Bea González and Paula Josemaría defeated Delfina Brea and Gemma Triay for the fifth time in a row, securing their fifth consecutive title of 2026.

In the men's category, the two top-ranked pairs on the FIP circuit reached the finals for the fifth time this season. In the title match, Alejandro Galán and Federico Chingotto defeated Agustín Tapia and Arturo Coello for the fourth time in a final this year, claiming their fifth title of 2026.

== Relevant Data ==
=== Argentina breaks its own record and sets a new attendance record ===
During the semifinals at Estadio Parque Roca, a total of 16,920 fans packed the stands, setting a new all-time attendance record for a padel match. Argentina thus beccame the only country to have surpassed the 16,000 spectator mark at an event of this kind on two separate occasions.

=== Coello reaches the 50-mark but loses again in the final ===
Despite the loss in the final, Arturo Coello reached his 50th Premier Padel final. Having first reached a final in Monterrey in 2022, where he won his first tournament on the circuit alongside Fernando Belasteguín, he has now made 50 final appearances, including those with Agustín Tapia (who has 49). The rest of the top four is rounded out by Alejandro Galán, with 47, and Federico Chingotto, with 42.

However, it was Alejandro Galán and Federico Chingotto who claimed their fifth title of the season. They reversed the trend of the previous two seasons (34 matches played since the start of 2024, with a 21–13 overall record) by posting a favorable 4–1 record against Coello and Tapia this year, thereby almost closing the gap on their rivals in the rankings.

=== New record for Bea and Paula ===
With Bea González and Paula Josemaria’s victory at the Buenos Aires P1, the third consecutive title in Argentina for Paula who also won in 2024 and 2025, the pair became the first women's duo to win five consecutive tournaments.

== Seeds ==
Male

Rnk.	Team	FIP Ranking Points
1	(Argentina) Agustín Tapia (Spain) Arturo Coello	41340
2	(Spain) Alejandro Galán (Argentina) Federico Chingotto	35160
3	(Argentina) Franco Stupaczuk (Spain) Mike Yanguas	13290
4	(Spain) Juan Lebrón (Argentina) Leandro Augsburguer	13285
5	(Spain) Francisco Guerrero (Spain) Paquito Navarro	11320
6	(Spain) Coki Nieto (Spain) Jon Sanz	10997
7	(Argentina) Martín Di Nenno (Spain) Momo González	9310
8	(Brazil) Lucas Bergamini (Spain) Javi Garrido	7220
9	(Spain) Alejandro Ruiz (Spain) Juanlu Esbri	4980
10	(Spain) Jairo Bautista (Brazil) Lucas Campagnolo	4712
11	(Spain) Alejandro Arroyo (Argentina) Leonel Aguirre	4615
12	(Spain) Aimar Goñi (Spain) Eduardo Alonso	4514
13	(Argentina) Juan Tello (Spain) Maximiliano Arce	4334
14	(Argentina) Gonzalo Alfonso (Spain) Javier Barahona	4322
15	(Spain) Javier Garcia Mora (Spain) Jose Jimenez Casas	4275
16	(Argentina) Ignacio Archieri (Spain) Javier Leal	4005

Female

Rnk.	Team	FIP Ranking Points
1	(Argentina) Delfina Brea (Spain) Gemma Triay	35320
2	(Spain) Bea González (Spain) Paula Josemaria	28670
3	(Spain) Ariana Sánchez (Spain) Andrea Ustero	21040
4	(Spain) Claudia Fernandéz (Portugal) Sofia Araújo	19380
5	(Argentina) Claudia Jensen (Spain) Tamara Icardo	11955
6	(Spain) Marta Ortega (Spain) Martina Calvo	11015
7	(Spain) Alejandra Alonso (Spain) Alejandra Salazar	9910
8	(Spain) Marina Guinart (Spain) Veronica Virseda	8265
9	(Spain) Beatriz Caldera (Spain) Carmen Goenaga	7430
10	(Argentina) Aranzazu Osoro (Spain) Victoria Iglesias	7030
11	(Argentina) Martina Fassio Goyeneche (Spain) Raquel Eugenio Barrera	5090
12	(Italy) Carolina Orsi (Spain) Patricia Llaguno	4830
13	(Spain) Araceli Martinez (Spain) Lucía Sainz	4740
14	(Spain) Jessica Castelló (Spain) Lorena Rufo	4510
15	(Spain) Jimena Velasco (Spain) Marta Barrera	4235
16	(Argentina) Julieta Bidahorria (Spain) Marta Caparros	3280

== Head-to-head record between teams ranked in the top 4 during the season ==
=== Men's ===
Record	Coello–Tapia	Galán–Chingotto	Stupaczuk–Yanguas	Augsburger–Lebrón
Coello–Tapia	—	1–4	3–0	4–1
Galán–Chingotto	4–1	—	2–0	1–1
Stupaczuk–Yanguas	0–3	0–2	—	—
Augsburger–Lebrón	1–4	1–1	—	—

=== Women's ===
Record	D. Brea–Triay	B. González–Paula	Ariana–Ustero	Araúijo–C. Fernandez
D. Brea–Triay	—	1–5	2–1	3–0
B. González–Paula	5–1	—	3–2	2–0
Ariana–Ustero	1–2	2–3	—	—
Araúijo–C. Fernandez	0–3	0–2	—	—

== Draws ==
=== Men's Bracket ===
Round of 32
1	(Spain) Coello / (Argentina) Tapia	6	6
Q	(Chile) J. Valdes / (Argentina) R. Nuñez	3	3
29	(Spain) I. Sager / (Argentina) J.C Belluati	0	7	2
12	(Spain) A. Goñi / (Spain) E. Alonso	6	6	6
10	(Spain) J. Bautista / (Brazil) L. Campagnolo	6	2	6
32	(Spain) A. Cepero / (Spain) M. Benitez	3	6	3
WC	(Argentina) F. Peiron / (Argentina) S. Rolla	2	2
8	(Spain) J. Garrido / (Brazil) L. Bergamini	6	6
7	(Argentina) Di Nenno / (Spain) Momo	6	6
20	(Spain) J.G. Diestro / (Argentina) M. Blasco	3	1
23	(Spain) G. Rubio / (Spain) J. Ruiz	4	2
15	(Spain) J.G. Mora / (Spain) J.J. Casas	6	6
LL	(Argentina) I. Archieri / (Spain) J. Leal	6	3	4
Q	(Spain) A. Martinez / (Argentina) J. De Pascual	3	6	6
25	(Argentina) J. Rubini / (Argentina) Maxi	2	6	1
3	(Argentina) Stupaczuk / (Spain) Yanguas	6	4	6
4	(Spain) Lebrón / (Argentina) L. Augsburger	7	7
33	(Spain) D. Santigosa / (Spain) M. Sintes	6	6
28	(Argentina) I. Piotto / (Spain) M. Ortega	6	3
9	(Spain) A. Ruiz / (Spain) J. Esbri	7	6
11	(Spain) A. Arroyo / (Argentina) L. Aguirre	5	3
22	(Spain) P.G. Rodrigo / (Spain) P. Lijó	7	6
34	(Spain) J.L. Gonzalez / (Spain) M.H. Hernandez	1	3
5	(Spain) F. Guerrero / (Spain) Paquito	6	6
6	(Spain) Coki / (Spain) J. Sanz	7	6
24	(Spain) A.F. Lancha / (Spain) E. Goenaga	6	1
Q	(Spain) F. Cabeza / (Paraguay) M. San Martin	6	7	4
13	(Argentina) J. Tello / (Argentina) M. Arce	7	6	6
14	(Argentina) G. Alfonso / (Spain) J. Barahona	3	7	6
18	(Argentina) Sanyo / (Spain) V. Ruiz	6	5	3
26	(Italy) E. Jensen / (Spain) L.H. Quesada	6	0
2	(Argentina) Chingotto / (Spain) Galán	7	6

Round of 16
1	(Spain) Coello / (Argentina) Tapia	6	6
12	(Spain) A. Goñi / (Spain) E. Alonso	3	3
10	(Spain) J. Bautista / (Brazil) L. Campagnolo	1	6	7
8	(Spain) J. Garrido / (Brazil) L. Bergamini	6	3	5
7	(Argentina) Di Nenno / (Spain) Momo	4	4
15	(Spain) J.G. Mora / (Spain) J.J. Casas	6	6
Q	(Spain) A. Martinez / (Argentina) J. De Pascual	1	2
3	(Argentina) Stupaczuk / (Spain) Yanguas	6	6
4	(Spain) Lebrón / (Argentina) L. Augsburger	6	6
9	(Spain) A. Ruiz / (Spain) J. Esbri	2	3
22	(Spain) P.G. Rodrigo / (Spain) P. Lijó	4	3
5	(Spain) F. Guerrero / (Spain) Paquito	6	6
6	(Spain) Coki / (Spain) J. Sanz	7	6
13	(Argentina) J. Tello / (Argentina) M. Arce	5	1
14	(Argentina) G. Alfonso / (Spain) J. Barahona	1	1
2	(Argentina) Chingotto / (Spain) Galán	6	6

Quarter-Final
1	(Spain) Coello / (Argentina) Tapia	6	6
10	(Spain) J. Bautista / (Brazil) L. Campagnolo	2	2
15	(Spain) J.G. Mora / (Spain) J.J. Casas	6	3
3	(Argentina) Stupaczuk / (Spain) Yanguas	7	6
4	(Spain) Lebrón / (Argentina) L. Augsburger	6	6
5	(Spain) F. Guerrero / (Spain) Paquito	3	2
14	(Spain) Coki / (Spain) J. Sanz	1	6
2	(Argentina) Chingotto / (Spain) Galán	6	7

Semi-Finals
1	(Spain) Coello / (Argentina) Tapia	6	7
3	(Argentina) Stupaczuk / (Spain) Yanguas	2	6
4	(Spain) Lebrón / (Argentina) L. Augsburger	0	3
2	(Argentina) Chingotto / (Spain) Galán	6	6

Finals
1	(Spain) Coello / (Argentina) Tapia	2	1
2	(Argentina) Chingotto / (Spain) Galán	6	6

=== Women's Bracket ===
Round of 32
1	(Argentina) D. Brea / (Spain) G. Triay
Bye
13	(Spain) A. Martinez / (Spain) L. Sainz	6	7
Q	(Argentina) D. Valenzuela / (Brazil) R. Piltcher	2	5
21	(France) A. Collombon / (Spain) J. Montes	4	3
19	(Spain) A. Perez / (Spain) L. Martinez	6	6
16	(Argentina) J. Bidahorria / (Spain) M. Caparros	6	3	7
8	(Spain) M. Guinart / (Spain) V. Virseda	4	6	5
5	(Argentina) C. Jensen / (Spain) T. Icardo	6	6
Q	(Spain) A. Cortiles / (Spain) M. Arellano	3	4
15	(Spain) J. Velasco / (Spain) M. Barrera	6	5
Q	(Italy) G. Dal Pozzo / (Spain) N. Rodriguez	7	7
WC	(Argentina) D. Banchero / (Argentina) I. Jimenez	0	6
18	(Russia) K. Sharifova / (Spain) M. Borrero	6	7
Bye
4	(Spain) C. Fernández / (Portugal) S. Araújo
3	(Spain) A. Ustero / (Spain) A. Sánchez
Bye
14	(Spain) J. Castelló / (Spain) L. Rufo	4	6	6
17	(Spain) M.R. Abajo / (Spain) N. Canovas	6	1	1
22	(Spain) L. Manquillo / (Spain) N. Aguilar	6	4	2
12	(Italy) C. Orsi / (Spain) P. Llaguno	4	6	6
11	(Argentina) M. Goyeneche / (Spain) R. Barrera	2	1
6	(Spain) M. Ortega / (Spain) M. Calvo	6	6
7	(Spain) A. Salazar / (Spain) A. Alonso	6	4	6
23	(Portugal) A. Nogueira / (Spain) L. Luján	3	6	3
9	(Spain) B. Caldera / (Spain) C. Goenaga	4	2
10	(Argentina) A. Osoro / (Spain) V. Iglesias	6	6
Q	(Spain) M. Talavan / (Spain) S. Saiz	7	7
20	(Spain) T. Navarro / (Argentina) V. Riera	6	6
Bye
2	(Spain) B. González / (Spain) P. Josemaria

Round of 16
1	(Argentina) D. Brea / (Spain) G. Triay	6	6
13	(Spain) A. Martinez / (Spain) L. Sainz	1	3
19	(Spain) A. Perez / (Spain) L. Martinez	4	6	7
16	(Argentina) J. Bidahorria / (Spain) M. Caparros	6	1	6
5	(Argentina) C. Jensen / (Spain) T. Icardo	6	6
Q	(Italy) G. Dal Pozzo / (Spain) N. Rodriguez	2	2
18	(Russia) K. Sharifova / (Spain) M. Borrero	2	3
4	(Spain) C. Fernández / (Portugal) S. Araújo	6	6
3	(Spain) A. Ustero / (Spain) A. Sánchez	6	6
14	(Spain) J. Castelló / (Spain) L. Rufo	1	1
12	(Italy) C. Orsi / (Spain) P. Llaguno	4	4
6	(Spain) M. Ortega / (Spain) M. Calvo	6	6
7	(Spain) A. Salazar / (Spain) A. Alonso	7	2	7
10	(Argentina) A. Osoro / (Spain) V. Iglesias	6	6	5
Q	(Spain) M. Talavan / (Spain) S. Saiz	1	2
2	(Spain) B. González / (Spain) P. Josemaria	6	6

Quarter-Final
1	(Argentina) D. Brea / (Spain) G. Triay	*
19	(Spain) A. Perez / (Spain) L. Martinez
5	(Argentina) C. Jensen / (Spain) T. Icardo	6	3	1
4	(Spain) C. Fernández / (Portugal) S. Araújo	3	6	6
3	(Spain) A. Ustero / (Spain) A. Sánchez	6	6
6	(Spain) M. Ortega / (Spain) M. Calvo	0	2
7	(Spain) A. Salazar / (Spain) A. Alonso	5	6	2
2	(Spain) B. González / (Spain) P. Josemaria	7	2	6

Semi-Finals
1	(Argentina) D. Brea / (Spain) G. Triay	3	7	6
4	(Spain) C. Fernández / (Portugal) S. Araújo	6	6	4
3	(Spain) A. Ustero / (Spain) A. Sánchez	6	5	4
2	(Spain) B. González / (Spain) P. Josemaria	2	7	6

Finals
1	(Argentina) D. Brea / (Spain) G. Triay	3	5
2	(Spain) B. González / (Spain) P. Josemaria	6	7

== Results ==
=== First Round ===
Men's

Date	Winners	Score	Opponent	Refs.
12/5/2026	(Chile) Javier Valdes (Argentina) Renzo Gabriel Nuñez	6–3 / 6–3	(Spain) Adrian Ronco Lopez (Argentina) Julian Lacamoire	
12/5/2026	(Spain) Ignacio Sager (Argentina) Juan Cruz Belluati	3–6 / 7–6 / 7–6	(Argentina) Facundo Luis Lopez (Argentina) Franco Dal Bianco	
12/5/2026	(Spain) Álvaro Cepero (Spain) Miguel Benitez	6–1 / 5–7 / 6–4	(Argentina) Felipe Calleja (Argentina) Juan Pablo Dametto	
12/5/2026	(Argentina) Fabricio Ivan Peiron (Argentina) Santiago Rolla	6–4 / 1–6 / 6–4	(Argentina) Federico Chiostri (Argentina) Ramiro Pereyra	
12/5/2026	(Spain) Jose Garcia Diestro (Argentina) Maximiliano Sánchez Blasco	6–3 / 5–7 / 6–2	(Spain) David Gala Sánchez (United Arab Emirates) Iñigo Jofre	
12/5/2026	(Spain) Gonzalo Rubio (Spain) Javier Ruiz	6–3 / 7–6	(Spain) Diego Garcia Garcia (Spain) Santiago Pineda Cabello	
12/5/2026	(Spain) Alonso Rodriguez Martinez (Argentina) Juan De Pascual	4–6 / 7–6 / 6–3	(Italy) Alvaro Montiel Caruso (Italy) Flavio Abbate	
12/5/2026	(Argentina) Juan Rubini (Argentina) Maxi Sánchez	6–3 / 7–5	(Argentina) Alex Chozas (Argentina) Valentino Libaak	
12/5/2026	(Spain) Daniel Santigosa (Spain) Marc Sintes	6–3 / 6–1	(Argentina) Eduardo Agustín Torre (Argentina) Lucho Capra	
12/5/2026	(Argentina) Ignacio Piotto (Spain) Mario Ortega	3–6 / 6–3 / 6–3	(Spain) Francisco Gil Morales (Spain) Manuel Castaño	
12/5/2026	(Spain) Pablo Garcia Rodrigo (Spain) Pablo Lijó	4–6 / 7–5 / 6–1	(Spain) Guillermo Collado (Spain) Pol Hernandez	
12/5/2026	(Spain) Jose Luis Gonzalez (Spain) Mario Huete Hernandez	6–3 / 6–2	(Italy) Denis Perino (Spain) Pincho Fernandez	
12/5/2026	(Spain) Andres Fernandez Lancha (Spain) Enrique Goenaga	5–7 / 6–4 / 6–3	(Argentina) Agustín Gutiérrez (Spain) Salvador Oria	
12/5/2026	(Spain) Francisco Cabeza (Paraguay) Mariano San Martin	7–6 / 6–3	(Italy) Facundo Dominguez (Spain) Teodoro Zapata	
12/5/2026	(Argentina) Sanyo Gutiérrez (Spain) Victor Ruiz	6–4 / 6–3	(Argentina) Naim Díaz (Argentina) Santino Contreras	
12/5/2026	(Italy) Enzo Jensen (Spain) Luis Hernandez Quesada	6–3 / 6–3	(Argentina) Aris Patiniotis (Spain) Javier Martinez	

=== Round of 32 ===
Men's

Date	Winners	Score	Opponent	Refs.
13/5/2026	(Argentina) Agustín Tapia (Spain) Arturo Coello	6–3 / 6–3	(Chile) Javier Valdes (Argentina) Renzo Gabriel Nuñez	
13/5/2026	(Spain) Aimar Goñi (Spain) Eduardo Alonso	6–0 / 6–7 / 6–2	(Spain) Ignacio Sager (Argentina) Juan Cruz Belluati	
13/5/2026	(Spain) Jairo Bautista (Brazil) Lucas Campagnolo	6–3 / 2–6 / 6–3	(Spain) Álvaro Cepero (Spain) Miguel Benitez	
13/5/2026	(Spain) Javier Garrido (Brazil) Lucas Bergamini	6–2 / 6–2	(Argentina) Fabricio Ivan Peiron (Argentina) Santiago Rolla	
13/5/2026	(Argentina) Martin Di Nenno (Spain) Momo González	6–3 / 6–1	(Spain) Jose Garcia Diestro (Argentina) Maximiliano Sánchez Blasco	
13/5/2026	(Spain) Javier Garcia Mora (Spain) Jose Jimenez Casas	6–4 / 6–2	(Spain) Gonzalo Rubio (Spain) Javier Ruiz	
13/5/2026	(Spain) Alonso Rodriguez Martinez (Argentina) Juan De Pascual	3–6 / 6–3 / 6–4	(Argentina) Ignacio Archieri (Spain) Javi Leal	
13/5/2026	(Argentina) Franco Stupaczuk (Spain) Mike Yanguas	6–2 / 4–6 / 6–1	(Argentina) Juan Rubini (Argentina) Maxi Sánchez	
13/5/2026	(Spain) Juan Lebrón (Argentina) Leandro Augsburger	7–6 / 7–6	(Spain) Daniel Santigosa (Spain) Marc Sintes	
13/5/2026	(Spain) Aléx Ruiz (Spain) Juanlu Esbri	7–6 / 6–3	(Argentina) Ignacio Piotto (Spain) Mario Ortega	
13/5/2026	(Spain) Pablo Garcia Rodrigo (Spain) Pablo Lijó	7–5 / 6–3	(Spain) Alex Arroyo (Argentina) Leonel Aguirre	
13/5/2026	(Spain) Francisco Guerrero (Spain) Paquito Navarro	6–1 / 6–3	(Spain) Jose Luis Gonzalez (Spain) Mario Huete Hernandez	
13/5/2026	(Spain) Coki Nieto (Spain) Jon Sanz	7–6 / 6–1	(Spain) Andres Fernandez Lancha (Spain) Enrique Goenaga	
13/5/2026	(Argentina) Juan Tello (Argentina) Maximiliano Arce	7–6 / 6–7 / 6–4	(Spain) Francisco Cabeza (Paraguay) Mariano San Martin	
13/5/2026	(Argentina) Gonzalo Alfonso (Spain) Javier Barahona	3–6 / 7–5 / 6–3	(Argentina) Sanyo Gutiérrez (Spain) Victor Ruiz	
13/5/2026	(Spain) Alejandro Galán (Argentina) Federico Chingotto	7–6 / 6–0	(Italy) Enzo Jensen (Spain) Luis Hernandez Quesada	

Women's

Date	Winners	Score	Opponent	Refs.
13/5/2026	(Spain) Araceli Martinez (Spain) Lucía Sainz	6–2 / 7–5	(Argentina) Daiara Agustina Valenzuela (Brazil) Raquel Piltcher	
12/5/2026	(Spain) Agueda Perez (Spain) Lucia Martinez	6–4 / 6–3	(France) Alix Collombon (Spain) Jana Montes Cabruja	
12/5/2026	(Argentina) Julieta Bidahorria (Spain) Marta Caparros	6–4 / 3–6 / 7–5	(Spain) Marina Guinart (Spain) Verónica Virseda	
13/5/2026	(Argentina) Claudia Jensen (Spain) Tamara Icardo	6–3 / 6–4	(Spain) Anna Cortiles (Spain) Marta Arellano Navarro	
13/5/2026	(Italy) Giulia Dal Pozzo (Spain) Nuria Rodriguez	7–6 / 7–5	(Spain) Jimena Velasco (Spain) Marta Barrera	
12/5/2026	(Russia) Ksenia Sharifova (Spain) Marta Borrero	6–0 / 7–6	(Argentina) Daniela Banchero (Argentina) Irene Jimenez	
13/5/2026	(Spain) Jessica Castelló (Spain) Lorena Rufo	4–6 / 6–1 / 6–1	(Spain) Maria Rodriguez Abajo (Spain) Noa Canovas	
13/5/2026	(Italy) Carolina Orsi (Spain) Patricia Llaguno	4–6 / 6–4 / 6–2	(Spain) Letizia Manquillo (Spain) Noemi Aguilar	
13/5/2026	(Spain) Marta Ortega (Spain) Martina Calvo	6–2 / 6–1	(Argentina) Martina Fassio Goyeneche (Spain) Raquel Eugenio Barrera	
12/5/2026	(Spain) Alejandra Alonso (Spain) Alejandra Salazar	6–3 / 4–6 / 6–3	(Portugal) Ana Catarina Nogueira (Spain) Laura Luján	
13/5/2026	(Argentina) Aranzazu Osoro (Spain) Victoria Iglesias	6–4 / 6–2	(Spain) Beatriz Caldera (Spain) Carmen Goenaga	
13/5/2026	(Spain) Marta Talavan (Spain) Sofía Saiz Vallejo	7–6 / 7–6	(Spain) Teresa Navarro (Argentina) Virginia Riera	

=== Round of 16 ===
Men's

Date	Winners	Score	Opponent	Refs.
14/5/2026	(Argentina) Agustín Tapia (Spain) Arturo Coello	6–3 / 6–3	(Spain) Aimar Goñi (Spain) Eduardo Alonso	
14/5/2026	(Spain) Jairo Bautista (Brazil) Lucas Campagnolo	1–6 / 6–3 / 7–5	(Spain) Javier Garrido (Brazil) Lucas Bergamini	
14/5/2026	(Spain) Javier Garcia Mora (Spain) Jose Jimenez Casas	6–4 / 6–4	(Argentina) Martin Di Nenno (Spain) Momo González	
14/5/2026	(Argentina) Franco Stupaczuk (Spain) Mike Yanguas	6–1 / 6–2	(Spain) Alonso Rodriguez Martinez (Argentina) Juan De Pascual	
14/5/2026	(Spain) Juan Lebrón (Argentina) Leandro Augsburger	6–2 / 6–3	(Spain) Aléx Ruiz (Spain) Juanlu Esbri	
14/5/2026	(Spain) Francisco Guerrero (Spain) Paquito Navarro	6–4 / 6–3	(Spain) Pablo Garcia Rodrigo (Spain) Pablo Lijó	
14/5/2026	(Spain) Coki Nieto (Spain) Jon Sanz	7–5 / 6–1	(Argentina) Juan Tello (Argentina) Maximiliano Arce	
14/5/2026	(Spain) Alejandro Galán (Argentina) Federico Chingotto	6–1 / 6–1	(Argentina) Gonzalo Alfonso (Spain) Javier Barahona	

Women's

Date	Winners	Score	Opponent	Refs.
14/5/2026	(Argentina) Delfina Brea (Spain) Gemma Triay	6–1 / 6–3	(Spain) Araceli Martinez (Spain) Lucía Sainz	
14/5/2026	(Spain) Agueda Perez (Spain) Lucia Martinez	4–6 / 6–1 / 7–6	(Argentina) Julieta Bidahorria (Spain) Marta Caparros	
14/5/2026	(Argentina) Claudia Jensen (Spain) Tamara Icardo	6–2 / 6–2	(Italy) Giulia Dal Pozzo (Spain) Nuria Rodriguez	
14/5/2026	(Spain) Claudia Fernández (Portugal) Sofia Araújo	6–2 / 6–3	(Russia) Ksenia Sharifova (Spain) Marta Borrero	
14/5/2026	(Spain) Andrea Ustero (Spain) Ariana Sánchez	6–1 / 6–1	(Spain) Jessica Castelló (Spain) Lorena Rufo	
14/5/2026	(Spain) Marta Ortega (Spain) Martina Calvo	6–4 / 6–4	(Italy) Carolina Orsi (Spain) Patricia Llaguno	
14/5/2026	(Spain) Alejandra Alonso (Spain) Alejandra Salazar	7–6 / 2–6 / 7–5	(Argentina) Aranzazu Osoro (Spain) Victoria Iglesias	
14/5/2026	(Spain) Bea González (Spain) Paula Josemaría	6–1 / 6–2	(Spain) Marta Talavan (Spain) Sofía Saiz Vallejo	

=== Quarter-Finals ===
Men's

Date	Winners	Score	Opponent	Refs.
15/5/2026	(Argentina) Agustín Tapia (Spain) Arturo Coello	6–2 / 6–2	(Spain) Jairo Bautista (Brazil) Lucas Campagnolo	
15/5/2026	(Argentina) Franco Stupaczuk (Spain) Mike Yanguas	7–6 / 6–3	(Spain) Javier Garcia Mora (Spain) Jose Jimenez Casas	
15/5/2026	(Spain) Juan Lebrón (Argentina) Leandro Augsburger	6–3 / 6–2	(Spain) Francisco Guerrero (Spain) Paquito Navarro	
15/5/2026	(Spain) Alejandro Galán (Argentina) Federico Chingotto	6–1 / 7–6	(Spain) Coki Nieto (Spain) Jon Sanz	

Women's

Date	Winners	Score	Opponent	Refs.
15/5/2026	(Argentina) Delfina Brea (Spain) Gemma Triay	W.O.	(Spain) Agueda Perez (Spain) Lucia Martinez	
15/5/2026	(Spain) Claudia Fernández (Portugal) Sofia Araújo	3–6 / 6–3 / 6–1	(Argentina) Claudia Jensen (Spain) Tamara Icardo	
15/5/2026	(Spain) Andrea Ustero (Spain) Ariana Sánchez	6–0 / 6–2	(Spain) Marta Ortega (Spain) Martina Calvo	
15/5/2026	(Spain) Bea González (Spain) Paula Josemaría	7–5 / 2–6 / 6–2	(Spain) Alejandra Alonso (Spain) Alejandra Salazar	

=== Semi-Finals ===
Men's

Date	Winners	Score	Opponent	Refs.
16/5/2026	(Argentina) Agustín Tapia (Spain) Arturo Coello	6–2 / 7–6	(Argentina) Franco Stupaczuk (Spain) Mike Yanguas	
16/5/2026	(Spain) Alejandro Galán (Argentina) Federico Chingotto	6–0 / 6–3	(Spain) Juan Lebrón (Argentina) Leandro Augsburger	

Women's

Date	Winners	Score	Opponent	Refs.
16/5/2026	(Argentina) Delfina Brea (Spain) Gemma Triay	3–6 / 7–6 / 6–4	(Spain) Claudia Fernández (Portugal) Sofia Araújo	
16/5/2026	(Spain) Bea González (Spain) Paula Josemaría	2–6 / 7–5 / 6–4	(Spain) Andrea Ustero (Spain) Ariana Sánchez	

=== Finals ===
Men's

Date	Winners	Score	Opponent	Refs.
17/5/2026	(Spain) Alejandro Galán (Argentina) Federico Chingotto	6–2 / 6–1	(Argentina) Agustín Tapia (Spain) Arturo Coello	

Women's

Date	Winners	Score	Opponent	Refs.
17/5/2026	(Spain) Bea González (Spain) Paula Josemaría	6–3 / 7–5	(Argentina) Delfina Brea (Spain) Gemma Triay	
