= 2024 Santiago P1 =

Padel championships

- Date: 26 May – 3 June
- Edition: 1st
- Category: P1
- Prize money: €470.000
- Location: Santiago, Chile
- Venue: Movistar Arena

Champions
- Men's doubles: (Argentina) Agustín Tapia (Spain) Arturo Coello
- Women's doubles: (Spain) Claudia Fernández (Spain) Gemma Triay

Chronology

The 2024 Santiago P1 (officially 2024 Banco de Chile Santiago Premier Padel P1) was the ninth tournament of the third season organized by Premier Padel, promoted by the International Padel Federation, and with the financial backing of Nasser Al-Khelaïfi's Qatar Sports Investments, now serving as the premier padel circuit.

In the women's division, none of the first two seeded pairs reach the finals for the second time in 2024, with Claudia Fernández and Gemma Triay (3rd) and Lucia Sainz and Patty Llaguno (8th) facing each other in the title match, with the number 3 seeds emerging victorious.

In the men's division, Alejandro Galán and Federico Chingotto faced Agustín Tapia and Arturo Coello faced each in the finals for the fifth time, with Coello and Tapia avenging their loss in the Mar del Plata to win their fifth title of the season.

== Relevant Data ==
=== Coello and Tapia's twentieth title ===
By winning this P1 tournament, Arturo Coello and Agustín Tapia secured their 20th title as a pair, needing just 37 tournaments and 26 finals to achieve the feat.

=== The youngest winner of all time ===
On the women's side, by winning the tournament Claudia Fernández became the youngest player ever to win a professional padel tournament, at 18 years, 3 months and 4 days.

== Seeds ==
Male

| Rnk. | Team | FIP Ranking Points |
|---|---|---|
| 1 | (Argentina) Agustín Tapia (Spain) Arturo Coello | 23937 |
| 2 | (Spain) Alejandro Galán (Argentina) Federico Chingotto | 18500 |
| 3 | (Spain) Juan Lebrón (Spain) Paquito Navarro | 17397 |
| 4 | (Argentina) Franco Stupaczuk (Argentina) Martin Di Nenno | 17043 |
| 5 | (Argentina) Fernando Belasteguín (Argentina) Juan Tello | 8596 |
| 6 | (Spain) Javi Garrido (Argentina) Miguel Yanguas | 7490 |
| 7 | (Argentina) Aléx Ruiz (Spain) Momo Gonzalez | 6604 |
| 8 | (Argentina) Maxi Sanchéz (Argentina) Sanyo Gutiérrez | 6297 |
| 9 | (Spain) Coki Nieto (Spain) Jon Sanz | 5771 |
| 10 | (Brazil) Lucas Bergamini (Spain) Victor Ruiz | 4711 |
| 11 | (Spain) Alejandro Arroyo (Spain) Eduardo Alonso | 3565 |
| 12 | (Spain) Francisco Gil Morales (Argentina) Ramiro Moyano | 3123 |
| 13 | (Argentina) Alex Chozas (Argentina) Lucho Capra | 3088 |
| 14 | (Spain) Javier Leal (Brazil) Lucas Campagnolo | 2888 |
| 15 | (Spain) Javi Rico (Spain) Juanlu Esbri | 2659 |
| 16 | (Spain) Gonzalo Rubio (Spain) Jairo Bautista | 2563 |

Female

| Rnk. | Team | FIP Ranking Points |
|---|---|---|
| 1 | (Spain) Ariana Sánchez (Spain) Paula Josemaria | 23942 |
| 2 | (Spain) Beatriz Gonzalez (Argentina) Delfina Brea | 18569 |
| 3 | (Spain) Claudia Fernandez (Spain) Gemma Triay | 12248 |
| 4 | (Spain) Alejandra Salazar (Spain) Tamara Icardo | 10226 |
| 5 | (Spain) Marta Ortega (Spain) Veronica Virseda | 10085 |
| 6 | (Argentina) Claudia Jensen (Spain) Jessica Castello | 9027 |
| 7 | (Portugal) Sofia Araújo (Argentina) Virginia Riera | 8394 |
| 8 | (Argentina) Lucia Sainz (Spain) Patty Llaguno | 5624 |
| 9 | (Argentina) Aranzazu Osoro (Italy) Carolina Orsi | 4478 |
| 10 | (Spain) Andrea Ustero (Spain) Alejandra Alonso | 2739 |
| 11 | (Spain) Beatriz Caldera (Spain) Lorena Rufo | 2640 |
| 12 | (Russia) Ksenia Sharifova (Spain) Lucia Martinez | 2357 |
| 13 | (Spain) Araceli Martinez (Spain) Marina Guinart | 2243 |
| 14 | (Spain) Esther Carnicero (Spain) Marina Lobo | 2144 |
| 15 | (Spain) Maria Eulalia Rodriguez Abajo (Spain) Nuria Rodriguez Camacho | 2093 |
| 16 | (France) Alix Collombon (Argentina) Julieta Bidahorria | 2078 |

´

== Head-to-head record between teams ranked in the top 4 during the season ==
=== Man's ===
| Record | Coello–Tapia | Galán–Chingotto | Lebrón–Paquito | Di Nenno–Stupaczuk | Former Pairs | Galán–Lebrón | Paquito–Sanyo |
| Coello–Tapia | — | 3–3 | 2–0 | — | | 1–1 | 2–0 |
| Galán–Chingotto | 3–3 | — | — | 5–0 | | — | — |
| Lebrón–Paquito | 0–2 | — | — | 0–1 | | — | — |
| Di Nenno–Stupaczuk | — | 0–5 | 1–0 | — | | 0–2 | — |
| Former Pairs | | | | | | | |
| Galán–Lebrón | 1–1 | — | — | 2–0 | | — | — |
| Paquito–Sanyo | 0–2 | — | — | — | | — | — |

=== Women's ===
| Record | Ariana–Paula | Gonzalez–D. Brea | Fernandez–Triay | Icardo–Salazar | Former Pairs | Ortega–Triay | Ortega–Virseda |
| Ariana–Paula | — | 2–1 | 2–3 | 1–0 | | — | 1–0 |
| B. Gonzalez–D. Brea | 1–2 | — | 3–0 | 3–0 | | — | — |
| Fernandez–Triay | 3–2 | 0–3 | — | 0–1 | | — | — |
| Icardo–Salazar | 0–1 | 0–3 | 1–0 | — | | — | — |
| Former Pairs | | | | | | | |
| Ortega–Triay | — | — | — | — | | — | — |
| Ortega–Virseda | 0–1 | — | — | — | | — | — |

== Draws ==
=== Men's Bracket ===
Round of 32
1 | (Spain) Coello / (Argentina) Tapia | 3 | *
19 | (Spain) I. Sager / (Spain) S. Oria | 1
Q | (Spain) E. Chamero / (Chile) J. Valdes | 1 | 3
13 | (Argentina) A. Chozas / (Argentina) L. Capra | 6 | 6
9 | (Spain) Coki / (Spain) J. Sanz | 6 | 6
18 | (Argentina) J.C. Belluati / (Argentina) M. Lamperti | 2 | 2
Q | (Spain) A. Luque / (Spain) J.L. Gonzalez | 3 | 4
5 | (Argentina) Belasteguin / (Argentina) J. Tello | 6 | 6
8 | (Argentina) Maxi / (Argentina) Sanyo | 2 | 3
22 | (Spain) J. Barahona / (Spain) T. Zapata | 6 | 6
20 | (Spain) F. Guerrero / (Spain) P. Cardona | 6 | 6 | 3
11 | (Spain) A. Arroyo / (Spain) E. Alonso | 7 | 3 | 6
12 | (Spain) F. Gil / (Argentina) R. Moyano | 4 | 6 | 5
21 | (Spain) J. Munoz / (Spain) J.G. Mora | 6 | 4 | 7
Q | (Spain) M. Quilez / (Spain) T. Bueno | 2 | 6 | 1
3 | (Spain) Lebrón / (Spain) Paquito | 6 | 4 | 6
4 | (Argentina) F. Stupaczuk / (Argentina) Di Nenno | 6 | 6
36 | (Spain) J.G. Diestro / (Spain) P. Alvarez | 1 | 4
33 | (Spain) D. Gil / (Spain) R.M. Duran | 5 | 4
14 | (Spain) J. Leal / (Brazil) L. Campagnolo | 7 | 6
15 | (Spain) J. Rico / (Spain) J. Esbri | 2 | 5
34 | (Argentina) L. Augsburger / (Argentina) V. Libaak | 6 | 7
24 | (Spain) E. Goenaga / (Spain) V. Mena | 2 | 4
6 | (Spain) J. Garrido / (Spain) Yanguas | 6 | 6
7 | (Spain) A. Ruiz / (Spain) Momo | 6 | 6
35 | (Spain) C. Marti / (Spain) M. Solbes | 3 | 3
29 | (Spain) I. Vilariño / (Spain) M. Semmler | 6 | 3 | 4
16 | (Spain) G. Rubio / (Spain) J. Bautista | 3 | 6 | 6
10 | (Brazil) L. Bergamini / (Spain) V. Ruiz | 7 | 4 | 3
17 | (Argentina) A. Gutierrez / (Spain) J. Rico | 6 | 6 | 6
28 | (Italy) A. Patiniotis / (Italy) F. Dominguez | 4 | 4
2 | (Spain) Galán / (Argentina) F. Chingotto | 6 | 6

Round of 16
1 | (Spain) Coello / (Argentina) Tapia | 6 | 4 | 6
13 | (Argentina) A. Chozas / (Argentina) L. Capra | 2 | 6 | 1
9 | (Spain) Coki / (Spain) J. Sanz | 7 | 3 | 6
5 | (Argentina) Belasteguin / (Argentina) J. Tello | 5 | 6 | 7
22 | (Spain) J. Barahona / (Spain) T. Zapata | 4 | 4
11 | (Spain) A. Arroyo / (Spain) E. Alonso | 6 | 6
21 | (Spain) J. Munoz / (Spain) J.G. Mora | 3 | 4
3 | (Spain) Lebrón / (Spain) Paquito | 6 | 6
4 | (Argentina) F. Stupaczuk / (Argentina) Di Nenno | 6 | 6
14 | (Spain) J. Leal / (Brazil) L. Campagnolo | 3 | 4
34 | (Argentina) L. Augsburger / (Argentina) V. Libaak | 4 | 3
6 | (Spain) J. Garrido / (Spain) Yanguas | 6 | 6
7 | (Spain) A. Ruiz / (Spain) Momo | 6 | 6
16 | (Spain) G. Rubio / (Spain) J. Bautista | 3 | 3
17 | (Argentina) A. Gutierrez / (Spain) J. Rico | 1 | 0
2 | (Spain) Galán / (Argentina) F. Chingotto | 6 | 6

Quarter-Final
1 | (Spain) Coello / (Argentina) Tapia | 6 | 6
5 | (Argentina) Belasteguin / (Argentina) J. Tello | 2 | 2
11 | (Spain) A. Arroyo / (Spain) E. Alonso | 3 | 6 | 4
3 | (Spain) Lebrón / (Spain) Paquito | 6 | 3 | 6
4 | (Argentina) F. Stupaczuk / (Argentina) Di Nenno | 6 | 7 | 6
6 | (Spain) J. Garrido / (Spain) Yanguas | 7 | 5 | 4
7 | (Spain) A. Ruiz / (Spain) Momo | 3 | 7 | 6
2 | (Spain) Galán / (Argentina) F. Chingotto | 6 | 5 | 7

Semi-Finals
1 | (Spain) Coello / (Argentina) Tapia | 6 | 6
3 | (Spain) Lebrón / (Spain) Paquito | 4 | 4
4 | (Argentina) F. Stupaczuk / (Argentina) Di Nenno | 3 | 2
2 | (Spain) Galán / (Argentina) F. Chingotto | 6 | 6

Finals
1 | (Spain) Coello / (Argentina) Tapia | 6 | 4 | 6
2 | (Spain) Galán / (Argentina) F. Chingotto | 0 | 6 | 4

=== Women's Bracket ===
Round of 32
1 | (Spain) A. Sanchez / (Spain) P. Josemaria | 6 | 6
13 | (Spain) A. Martinez / (Spain) M. Guinart | 0 | 1
Q | (Spain) J. Bautista / (Spain) L. Arruabarrena | 6 | 5 | 2
16 | (France) A. Collombon / (Argentina) J. Bidahorria | 4 | 7 | 6
24 | (Spain) A. Perez / (Spain) P. Martinez | 4 | 6 | 1
20 | (Spain) M. Merino / (Spain) S. Saiz | 6 | 1 | 6
27 | (Italy) G. Marchetti / (Spain) S. Pujals | 3 | 5
5 | (Spain) M. Ortega / (Spain) V. Virseda | 6 | 7
6 | (Argentina) C. Jensen / (Spain) J. Castello | 6 | 6
23 | (Spain) J. Cabruja / (Spain) M. Talavan | 3 | 4
Q | (Spain) A. Rojo / (Italy) L. Vano | 6 | 6
WC | (Chile) G. Vidal / (Chile) G. Minieri | 2 | 4
17 | (Spain) J. Velasco / (Spain) N. Canovas | 7 | 6
26 | (Spain) M. Borrero / (Spain) S. Bellver | 5 | 4
25 | (Spain) A. Soriano / (Italy) C. Casali | 5 | 1
3 | (Spain) C. Fernandez / (Spain) G. Triay | 7 | 6
4 | (Spain) A. Salazar / (Spain) T. Icardo | 1
11 | (Spain) B. Caldera / (Spain) L. Rufo | 3 | *
22 | (Spain) A. Cañellas / (Spain) T. Navarro | 2 | 3
10 | (Spain) A. Ustero / (Spain) A. Alonso | 6 | 6
9 | (Argentina) A. Osoro / (Italy) C. Orsi | 6 | 6
14 | (Spain) E. Carnicero / (Spain) M. Lobo | 2 | 2
Q | (Spain) L. Manquillo / (Spain) N. Aguilar | 1 | 2
7 | (Portugal) S. Araújo / (Argentina) V. Riera | 6 | 6
8 | (Spain) L. Sainz / (Spain) P. Llaguno | 6 | 6
19 | (Spain) C. Mesa / (Spain) S. Ruiz | 2 | 1
18 | (Spain) B. Las Heras / (Spain) V. Iglesias | 7 | 7
21 | (Spain) M. Barrera / (Spain) M. Caparros | 5 | 6
12 | (Russia) K. Sharifova / (Spain) L. Martinez | 6 | 6
Q | (Spain) C. Castillon / (Brazil) R. Piltcher | 2 | 2
15 | (Spain) M.R. Abajo / (Spain) N. Rodriguez | 2 | 6 | 6
2 | (Spain) B. Gonzalez / (Argentina) D. Brea | 6 | 3 | 5

Round of 16
1 | (Spain) A. Sanchez / (Spain) P. Josemaria | 6 | 7
16 | (France) A. Collombon / (Argentina) J. Bidahorria | 3 | 5
20 | (Spain) M. Merino / (Spain) S. Saiz | 1 | 0
5 | (Spain) M. Ortega / (Spain) V. Virseda | 6 | 6
6 | (Argentina) C. Jensen / (Spain) J. Castello | 6 | 6
Q | (Spain) A. Rojo / (Italy) L. Vano | 1 | 2
17 | (Spain) J. Velasco / (Spain) N. Canovas | 1 | 3
3 | (Spain) C. Fernandez / (Spain) G. Triay | 6 | 6
11 | (Spain) B. Caldera / (Spain) L. Rufo | 2 | 6
10 | (Spain) A. Ustero / (Spain) A. Alonso | 6 | 7
9 | (Argentina) A. Osoro / (Italy) C. Orsi | 6 | 6
7 | (Portugal) S. Araújo / (Argentina) V. Riera | 4 | 3
8 | (Spain) L. Sainz / (Spain) P. Llaguno | 6 | 6
18 | (Spain) B. Las Heras / (Spain) V. Iglesias | 3 | 4
12 | (Russia) K. Sharifova / (Spain) L. Martinez | 4 | 6 | 2
15 | (Spain) M.R. Abajo / (Spain) N. Rodriguez | 6 | 2 | 6

Quarter-Final
1 | (Spain) A. Sanchez / (Spain) P. Josemaria | 6 | 6
5 | (Spain) M. Ortega / (Spain) V. Virseda | 4 | 1
6 | (Argentina) C. Jensen / (Spain) J. Castello | 5 | 2
3 | (Spain) C. Fernandez / (Spain) G. Triay | 7 | 6
10 | (Spain) A. Ustero / (Spain) A. Alonso | 6 | 6
9 | (Argentina) A. Osoro / (Italy) C. Orsi | 4 | 3
8 | (Spain) L. Sainz / (Spain) P. Llaguno | 6 | 6
15 | (Spain) M.R. Abajo / (Spain) N. Rodriguez | 1 | 1

Semi-Finals
1 | (Spain) A. Sanchez / (Spain) P. Josemaria | 6 | 2
3 | (Spain) C. Fernandez / (Spain) G. Triay | 7 | 6
10 | (Spain) A. Ustero / (Spain) A. Alonso | 6 | 1
8 | (Spain) L. Sainz / (Spain) P. Llaguno | 7 | 6

Finals
3 | (Spain) C. Fernandez / (Spain) G. Triay | 6 | 6
8 | (Spain) L. Sainz / (Spain) P. Llaguno | 1 | 4

== Results ==
=== Round of 64 ===
Men's

| Date | Winners | Score | Opponent | Refs. |
|---|---|---|---|---|
| 29/5/2024 | (Spain) Ignacio Sager (Spain) Salvador Oria | 6–1 / 6–3 | (Chile) Ignacio Lehyt Sances (Chile) Sebastian Muñoz Campos | |
| 29/5/2024 | (Spain) Emilio Sanchez Chamero (Chile) Javier Valdes | 7–6 / 6–4 | (Spain) Inigo Jofre (Spain) Luis Hernandez Quesada | |
| 28/5/2024 | (Spain) Juan Cruz Belluati (Argentina) Miguel Lamperti | 6–1 / 6–3 | (Chile) Cristobal Martinez (Chile) Cristobal Molina | |
| 29/5/2024 | (Spain) Antonio Luque (Spain) Jose Luis Gonzalez | 7–6 / 4–6 / 6–2 | (Spain) Ivan Ramirez (Spain) Jose Jimenez Casas | |
| 28/5/2024 | (Spain) Javier Gonzalez Barahona (Spain) Teodoro Zapata | 6–4 / 6–4 | (Spain) Álvero Cepero (Spain) Miguel Benítez | |
| 29/5/2024 | (Spain) Francisco Guerrero (Spain) Pablo Cardona | 6–2 / 6–2 | (Argentina) Federico Mouriño (Argentina) Ignacio Piotto | |
| 28/5/2024 | (Spain) Javier García Mora (Spain) Jaime Muñoz | 6–2 / 6–3 | (Argentina) Agustin Gomez Silingo (Portugal) Gustavo Nunes | |
| 29/5/2024 | (Spain) Marc Quilez (Spain) Toni Bueno | 7–6 / 6–4 | (Spain) Antón Sans (Spain) David Gala Sanchez | |
| 28/5/2024 | (Spain) Jose García Diestro (Spain) Pol Hernandez | 6–7 / 7–5 / 6–3 | (Spain) Jose Sanchez Serrano (Spain) Mario Ortega | |
| 29/5/2024 | (Spain) Diego Gil Batista (Spain) Raúl Marcos Duran | 7–5 / 6–3 | (Spain) Alvaro Melendez Amaya (Spain) Pedro Melendez Amaya | |
| 28/5/2024 | (Argentina) Leandro Augsburger (Argentina) Valentino Libaak | 6–4 / 4–6 / 6–4 | (Argentina) Cristian German Gutiérrez (Spain) Jorge Ruiz Gutiérrez | |
| 29/5/2024 | (Spain) Enrique Goenaga (Spain) Victor Mena Gil | 7–6 / 6–3 | (Spain) Aitor Garcia Bassas (Spain) Mario Huete | |
| 29/5/2024 | (Spain) Carlos Marti (Spain) Miguel Angel Solbes | 4–6 / 6–2 / 6–1 | (Argentina) Axel Guevara (Chile) Carlos Zahri | |
| 29/5/2024 | (Spain) Ignacio Vilariño (Spain) Miguel Semmler | 6–4 / 7–6 | (Spain) Javier Martinez Vazquez (Spain) Pincho Fernandez | |
| 29/5/2024 | (Argentina) Agustin Gutiérrez (Spain) José Rico | 6–3 / 6–1 | (Spain) Alonso Rodriguez (Spain) Daniel Santigosa | |
| 28/5/2024 | (Italy) Aris Patiniotis (Italy) Facundo Dominguez | 7–5 / 7–5 | (Italy) Denis Perino (Spain) Pablo García Rodrigo | |

=== Round of 32 ===
Men's

| Date | Winners | Score | Opponent | Refs. |
|---|---|---|---|---|
| 30/5/2024 | (Argentina) Agustín Tapia (Spain) Arturo Coello | 3–1 / W.O. | (Spain) Ignacio Sager (Spain) Salvador Oria | |
| 30/5/2024 | (Argentina) Alex Chozas (Argentina) Luciano Capra | 6–1 / 6–3 | (Spain) Emilio Sanchez Chamero (Chile) Javier Valdes | |
| 30/5/2024 | (Spain) Coki Nieto (Spain) Jon Sanz | 6–2 / 6–2 | (Spain) Juan Cruz Belluati (Argentina) Miguel Lamperti | |
| 30/5/2024 | (Argentina) Fernando Belasteguín (Argentina) Juan Tello | 6–3 / 6–4 | (Spain) Antonio Luque (Spain) Jose Luis Gonzalez | |
| 30/5/2024 | (Spain) Javier Gonzalez Barahona (Spain) Teodoro Zapata | 6–2 / 6–3 | (Argentina) Maxi Sánchez (Argentina) Sanyo Gutiérrez | |
| 30/5/2024 | (Spain) Alejandro Arroyo (Spain) Eduardo Alonso | 7–6 / 3–6 / 6–3 | (Spain) Francisco Guerrero (Spain) Pablo Cardona | |
| 30/5/2024 | (Spain) Javier García Mora (Spain) Jaime Muñoz | 6–4 / 4–6 / 7–5 | (Spain) Francisco Gil Morales (Argentina) Ramiro Moyano | |
| 30/5/2024 | (Spain) Juan Lebrón (Spain) Paquito Navarro | 6–2 / 4–6 / 6–1 | (Spain) Marc Quilez (Spain) Toni Bueno | |
| 30/5/2024 | (Argentina) Franco Stupaczuk (Argentina) Martin Di Nenno | 6–1 / 6–4 | (Spain) Jose García Diestro (Spain) Pol Hernandez | |
| 30/5/2024 | (Spain) Javier Leal (Brazil) Lucas Campagnolo | 7–5 / 6–4 | (Spain) Diego Gil Batista (Spain) Raúl Marcos Duran | |
| 30/5/2024 | (Argentina) Leandro Augsburger (Argentina) Valentino Libaak | 6–2 / 7–5 | (Spain) Javier Rico (Spain) Juanlu Esbri | |
| 30/5/2024 | (Spain) Javi Garrido (Spain) Miguel Yanguas | 6–2 / 6–4 | (Spain) Enrique Goenaga (Spain) Victor Mena Gil | |
| 30/5/2024 | (Spain) Aléx Ruiz (Spain) Momo Gonzalez | 6–3 / 6–3 | (Spain) Carlos Marti (Spain) Miguel Angel Solbes | |
| 30/5/2024 | (Spain) Gonzalo Rubio (Spain) Jairo Bautista | 3–6 / 6–3 / 6–4 | (Spain) Ignacio Vilariño (Spain) Miguel Semmler | |
| 30/5/2024 | (Argentina) Agustin Gutiérrez (Spain) José Rico | 6–7 / 6–4 / 6–3 | (Brazil) Lucas Bergamini (Spain) Víctor Ruiz | |
| 30/5/2024 | (Spain) Alejandro Galán (Argentina) Federico Chingotto | 6–4 / 6–4 | (Italy) Aris Patiniotis (Italy) Facundo Dominguez | |

Women's

| Date | Winners | Score | Opponent | Refs. |
|---|---|---|---|---|
| 30/5/2024 | (Spain) Ariana Sánchez (Spain) Paula Josemaria | 6–0 / 6–1 | (Spain) Araceli Martinez (Spain) Marina Guinart | |
| 29/5/2024 | (France) Alix Collombon (Argentina) Julieta Bidahorria | 4–6 / 7–5 / 6–2 | (Spain) Julia Polo Bautista (Spain) Lara Arruabarrena | |
| 29/5/2024 | (Spain) Melania Merino (Spain) Sofía Saiz | 6–4 / 1–6 / 6–1 | (Spain) Agueda Perez (Spain) Patricia Martínez | |
| 29/5/2024 | (Spain) Marta Ortega (Spain) Verónica Virseda | 6–3 / 7–5 | (Italy) Giorgia Marchetti (Spain) Sara Pujals | |
| 29/5/2024 | (Argentina) Claudia Jensen (Spain) Jessica Castelló | 6–3 / 6–4 | (Spain) Jana Montes Cabruja (Spain) Marta Talavan | |
| 29/5/2024 | (Spain) Alicia Blanco Rojo (Italy) Lorena Vano | 6–2 / 6–4 | (Chile) Gabriela Roux Vidal (Chile) Gianina Minieri | |
| 30/5/2024 | (Spain) Jimena Velasco (Spain) Noa Canovas | 7–5 / 6–4 | (Spain) Marta Borrero (Spain) Sandra Bellver | |
| 30/5/2024 | (Spain) Claudia Fernandez (Spain) Gemma Triay | 7–5 / 6–1 | (Spain) Arantxa Soriano Perez (Italy) Carlotta Casali | |
| 30/5/2024 | (Spain) Beatriz Caldera (Spain) Lorena Rufo | 3–1 / W.O. | (Spain) Alejandra Salazar (Spain) Tamara Icardo | |
| 29/5/2024 | (Spain) Alejandra Alonso (Spain) Andrea Ustero | 6–2 / 6–3 | (Spain) Ariadna Cañellas (Spain) Teresa Navarro | |
| 29/5/2024 | (Argentina) Aranzazu Osoro (Italy) Carolina Orsi | 6–2 / 6–2 | (Spain) Esther Carnicero (Spain) Marina Martinez Lobo | |
| 29/5/2024 | (Portugal) Sofia Araújo (Argentina) Virginia Riera | 6–1 / 6–2 | (Spain) Letizia Manquillo (Spain) Noemi Aguilar | |
| 29/5/2024 | (Spain) Lucia Sainz (Spain) Patricia Llagunoz | 6–2 / 6–1 | (Spain) Carla Mesa (Spain) Sara Ruiz | |
| 29/5/2024 | (Spain) Barbara Las Heras (Spain) Victoria Iglesias | 7–5 / 7–6 | (Spain) Marta Barrera (Spain) Marta Caparrós | |
| 29/5/2024 | (Spain) Lucía Martínez (Russia) Ksenia Sharifova | 6–2 / 6–2 | (Spain) Carmen Castillon (Brazil) Raquel Piltcher | |
| 29/5/2024 | (Spain) Laia Rodriguez Abajo (Spain) Nuria Rodriguez | 1–6 / 6–3 / 7–5 | (Spain) Bea González (Argentina) Delfina Brea | |

=== Round of 16 ===
Men's

| Date | Winners | Score | Opponent | Refs. |
|---|---|---|---|---|
| 31/5/2024 | (Argentina) Agustín Tapia (Spain) Arturo Coello | 6–2 / 4–6 / 6–1 | (Argentina) Alex Chozas (Argentina) Luciano Capra | |
| 31/5/2024 | (Argentina) Fernando Belasteguín (Argentina) Juan Tello | 5–7 / 6–3 / 7–6 | (Spain) Coki Nieto (Spain) Jon Sanz | |
| 31/5/2024 | (Spain) Alejandro Arroyo (Spain) Eduardo Alonso | 6–4 / 6–4 | (Spain) Javier Gonzalez Barahona (Spain) Teodoro Zapata | |
| 31/5/2024 | (Spain) Juan Lebrón (Spain) Paquito Navarro | 6–3 / 6–4 | (Spain) Javier García Mora (Spain) Jaime Muñoz | |
| 31/5/2024 | (Argentina) Franco Stupaczuk (Argentina) Martin Di Nenno | 6–3 / 6–4 | (Spain) Javier Leal (Brazil) Lucas Campagnolo | |
| 31/5/2024 | (Spain) Javi Garrido (Spain) Miguel Yanguas | 6–4 / 6–3 | (Argentina) Leandro Augsburger (Argentina) Valentino Libaak | |
| 31/5/2024 | (Spain) Aléx Ruiz (Spain) Momo Gonzalez | 6–3 / 6–3 | (Spain) Gonzalo Rubio (Spain) Jairo Bautista | |
| 31/5/2024 | (Spain) Alejandro Galán (Argentina) Federico Chingotto | 6–1 / 6–0 | (Argentina) Agustin Gutiérrez (Spain) José Rico | |

Women's

| Date | Winners | Score | Opponent | Refs. |
|---|---|---|---|---|
| 31/5/2024 | (Spain) Ariana Sánchez (Spain) Paula Josemaria | 6–3 / 7–5 | (France) Alix Collombon (Argentina) Julieta Bidahorria | |
| 31/5/2024 | (Spain) Marta Ortega (Spain) Verónica Virseda | 6–1 / 6–0 | (Spain) Melania Merino (Spain) Sofía Saiz | |
| 31/5/2024 | (Argentina) Claudia Jensen (Spain) Jessica Castelló | 6–1 / 6–2 | (Spain) Alicia Blanco Rojo (Italy) Lorena Vano | |
| 31/5/2024 | (Spain) Claudia Fernandez (Spain) Gemma Triay | 6–1 / 6–3 | (Spain) Jimena Velasco (Spain) Noa Canovas | |
| 31/5/2024 | (Spain) Alejandra Alonso (Spain) Andrea Ustero | 6–2 / 7–6 | (Spain) Beatriz Caldera (Spain) Lorena Rufo | |
| 31/5/2024 | (Argentina) Aranzazu Osoro (Italy) Carolina Orsi | 6–4 / 6–3 | (Portugal) Sofia Araújo (Argentina) Virginia Riera | |
| 31/5/2024 | (Spain) Lucia Sainz (Spain) Patricia Llagunoz | 6–3 / 6–4 | (Spain) Barbara Las Heras (Spain) Victoria Iglesias | |
| 31/5/2024 | (Spain) Laia Rodriguez Abajo (Spain) Nuria Rodriguez | 6–4 / 2–6 / 6–2 | (Spain) Lucía Martínez (Russia) Ksenia Sharifova | |

=== Quarter-Finals ===
Men's

| Date | Winners | Score | Opponent | Refs. |
|---|---|---|---|---|
| 1/6/2024 | (Argentina) Agustín Tapia (Spain) Arturo Coello | 6–2 / 6–2 | (Argentina) Fernando Belasteguín (Argentina) Juan Tello | |
| 1/6/2024 | (Spain) Juan Lebrón (Spain) Paquito Navarro | 6–3 / 3–6 / 6–4 | (Spain) Alejandro Arroyo (Spain) Eduardo Alonso | |
| 1/6/2024 | (Argentina) Franco Stupaczuk (Argentina) Martin Di Nenno | 6–7 / 7–5 / 6–4 | (Spain) Javi Garrido (Spain) Miguel Yanguas | |
| 1/6/2024 | (Spain) Alejandro Galán (Argentina) Federico Chingotto | 6–3 / 5–7 / 7–6 | (Spain) Aléx Ruiz (Spain) Momo Gonzalez | |

Women's

| Date | Winners | Score | Opponent | Refs. |
|---|---|---|---|---|
| 1/6/2024 | (Spain) Ariana Sánchez (Spain) Paula Josemaria | 6–4 / 6–1 | (Spain) Marta Ortega (Spain) Verónica Virseda | |
| 1/6/2024 | (Spain) Claudia Fernandez (Spain) Gemma Triay | 7–5 / 6–2 | (Argentina) Claudia Jensen (Spain) Jessica Castelló | |
| 1/6/2024 | (Spain) Alejandra Alonso (Spain) Andrea Ustero | 6–4 / 6–3 | (Argentina) Aranzazu Osoro (Italy) Carolina Orsi | |
| 1/6/2024 | (Spain) Lucia Sainz (Spain) Patricia Llagunoz | 6–1 / 6–1 | (Spain) Laia Rodriguez Abajo (Spain) Nuria Rodriguez | |

=== Semi-Finals ===
Men's

| Date | Winners | Score | Opponent | Refs. |
|---|---|---|---|---|
| 2/6/2024 | (Argentina) Agustín Tapia (Spain) Arturo Coello | 6–4 / 6–4 | (Spain) Juan Lebrón (Spain) Paquito Navarro | |
| 2/6/2024 | (Spain) Alejandro Galán (Argentina) Federico Chingotto | 6–3 / 6–2 | (Argentina) Franco Stupaczuk (Argentina) Martin Di Nenno | |

Women's

| Date | Winners | Score | Opponent | Refs. |
|---|---|---|---|---|
| 2/6/2024 | (Spain) Claudia Fernandez (Spain) Gemma Triay | 7–6 / 6–2 | (Spain) Ariana Sánchez (Spain) Paula Josemaria | |
| 2/6/2024 | (Spain) Lucia Sainz (Spain) Patricia Llagunoz | 7–6 / 6–1 | (Spain) Alejandra Alonso (Spain) Andrea Ustero | |

=== Finals ===
Men's

| Date | Winners | Score | Opponent | Refs. |
|---|---|---|---|---|
| 3/6/2024 | (Argentina) Agustín Tapia (Spain) Arturo Coello | 6–0 / 4–6 / 6–4 | (Spain) Alejandro Galán (Argentina) Federico Chingotto | |

Women's

| Date | Winners | Score | Opponent | Refs. |
|---|---|---|---|---|
| 3/6/2024 | (Spain) Claudia Fernandez (Spain) Gemma Triay | 6–1 / 6–4 | (Spain) Lucia Sainz (Spain) Patricia Llagunoz | |
