= 2024 Mar del Plata P1 =

Padel championships

- Date: 18 – 26 May
- Edition: 1st
- Category: P1
- Prize money: €470.000
- Location: Mar del Plata, Argentina
- Venue: Polideportivo Islas Malvinas

Champions
- Men's doubles: (Spain) Alejandro Galán (Argentina) Federico Chingotto
- Women's doubles: (Spain) Ariana Sánchez (Spain) Paula Josemaría

Chronology

The 2024 Mar Del Plata P1 (officially 2024 Mar Del Plata Premier Padel P1) was the eight tournament of the third season organized by Premier Padel, promoted by the International Padel Federation, and with the financial backing of Nasser Al-Khelaïfi's Qatar Sports Investments, now serving as the premier padel circuit.

In the women's division, the first and second seeded pairs faced each other in the final for the third time in 2024, with Ariana Sánchez and Paula Josemaría claiming their third title of the season after defeating Bea Gonzalez and Delfina Brea.

In the men's division, Alejandro Galán and Federico Chingotto reached their fifth consecutive final, where they would face and defeat the No. 1 FIP ranked team, Agustín Tapia and Arturo Coello, winning their third as pair.

== Relevant Data ==
=== Coello/Tapia head-to-head against number 2 ===
By reaching the finals, Coello/Tapia and Chingotto/Galán would face each other for the fifth time in the season. With the number twos' victory, they would hold a winning record of 3–2 against the number ones (4-3 individually for Galán).

=== Shake-up in the Rankings ===
With the title win Galán reached the second spot in the rankings, surpassing Tapia and behind Coello, while Chingotto surpassed his former partner Paquito Navarro and Franco Stupaczuk to 6th.

=== Sanyo out of the top10 ===
With his early exit, Sanyo Gutiérrez dropped from 10th place in the ranking to 12th.

=== Women's Ranking ===
In the women's side, despite the victory by Ariana and Paula, reaching the final brought Bea and Delfina closer to the top spot in the rankings.

== Seeds ==
Male

Rnk.	Team	FIP Ranking Points
1	(Argentina) Agustín Tapia (Spain) Arturo Coello	23381
2	(Spain) Alejandro Galán (Argentina) Federico Chingotto	18315
3	(Spain) Juan Lebrón (Spain) Paquito Navarro	17471
4	(Argentina) Franco Stupaczuk (Argentina) Martin Di Nenno	17092
5	(Argentina) Fernando Belasteguín (Argentina) Juan Tello	8668
6	(Spain) Javi Garrido (Argentina) Miguel Yanguas	7424
7	(Argentina) Aléx Ruiz (Spain) Momo Gonzalez	6592
8	(Argentina) Maxi Sanchéz (Argentina) Sanyo Gutiérrez	6408
9	(Spain) Coki Nieto (Spain) Jon Sanz	5892
10	(Brazil) Lucas Bergamini (Spain) Victor Ruiz	4808
11	(Spain) Alejandro Arroyo (Spain) Eduardo Alonso	3537
12	(Spain) Francisco Gil Morales (Argentina) Ramiro Moyano	3178
13	(Argentina) Alex Chozas (Argentina) Lucho Capra	3071
14	(Spain) Javier Leal (Brazil) Lucas Campagnolo	2774
15	(Spain) Javi Ruiz (Spain) Pablo Cardona	2631
16	(Spain) Gonzalo Rubio (Spain) Jairo Bautista	2590

Female

Rnk.	Team	FIP Ranking Points
1	(Spain) Ariana Sanchez (Spain) Paula Josemaria	24112
2	(Spain) Beatriz Gonzalez (Argentina) Delfina Brea	17953
3	(Spain) Claudia Fernandez (Spain) Gemma Triay	11883
4	(Spain) Alejandra Salazar (Spain) Tamara Icardo	10438
5	(Spain) Marta Ortega (Spain) Veronica Virseda	9957
6	(Argentina) Claudia Jensen (Spain) Jessica Castello	9006
7	(Portugal) Sofia Araújo (Argentina) Virginia Riera	8399
8	(Argentina) Lucia Sainz (Spain) Patty Llaguno	5562
9	(Spain) Barbara Las Heras (Spain) Victoria Iglesias	5378
10	(Argentina) Aranzazu Osoro (Italy) Carolina Orsi	4530
11	(Spain) Andrea Ustero (Spain) Alejandra Alonso	2784
12	(Spain) Beatriz Caldera (Spain) Lorena Rufo	2664
13	(Portugal) Ana Catarina Nogueira (Spain) Marta Talavan	2643
14	(Russia) Ksenia Sharifova (Spain) Lucia Martinez	2315
15	(Spain) Esther Carnicero (Spain) Marina Lobo	2156
16	(Spain) Maria Eulalia Rodriguez Abajo (Spain) Nuria Rodriguez Camacho	2110

== Head-to-head record between teams ranked in the top 4 during the season ==
=== Man's ===
Record	Coello–Tapia	Galán–Chingotto	Lebrón–Paquito	Di Nenno–Stupaczuk	Former Pairs	Galán–Lebrón	Paquito–Sanyo
Coello–Tapia	—	2–3	1–0	—		1–1	2–0
Galán–Chingotto	3–2	—	—	4–0		—	—
Lebrón–Paquito	0–1	—	—	0–1		—	—
Di Nenno–Stupaczuk	—	0–4	1–0	—		0–2	—
Former Pairs							
Galán–Lebrón	1–1	—	—	2–0		—	—
Paquito–Sanyo	0–2	—	—	—		—	—

=== Women's ===
Record	Ariana–Paula	Gonzalez–D. Brea	Fernandez–Triay	Icardo–Salazar	Former Pairs	Ortega–Triay	Ortega–Virseda
Ariana–Paula	—	2–1	2–2	1–0		—	1–0
B. Gonzalez–D. Brea	1–2	—	3–0	3–0		—	—
Fernandez–Triay	2–2	0–3	—	0–1		—	—
Icardo–Salazar	0–1	0–3	1–0	—		—	—
Former Pairs							
Ortega–Triay	—	—	—	—		—	—
Ortega–Virseda	0–1	—	—	—		—	—

== Draws ==
=== Men's Bracket ===
Round of 32
1	(Spain) Coello / (Argentina) Tapia	6	6
28	(Argentina) C.G. Gutierrez / (Spain) J. Ruiz	1	3
Q	(Spain) Á. Amaya / (Spain) P. Amaya	3	2
14	(Spain) J. Leal / (Brazil) L. Campagnolo	6	6
13	(Argentina) A. Chozas / (Argentina) L. Capra	3	3
23	(Spain) J. Barahona / (Spain) T. Zapata	6	6
21	(Spain) J.G. Diestro / (Spain) P. Lijó	6	6	5
5	(Argentina) Belasteguin / (Argentina) J. Tello	7	4	7
6	(Spain) J. Garrido / (Spain) Yanguas	5	6	6
WC	(Spain) P.H. Alvarez / (Argentina) R. Valenzuela	7	2	4
WC	(Argentina) F. Chiostri / (Argentina) M.S. Blasco	6	2	7
12	(Spain) F. Gil / (Argentina) R. Moyano	3	6	6
9	(Spain) Coki / (Spain) J. Sanz	6	7
18	(Argentina) J.C. Belluati / (Argentina) M. Lamperti	3	5
34	(Spain) A. Cepero / (Spain) M. Benitez	6	6	2
3	(Spain) Lebrón / (Spain) Paquito	4	7	6
4	(Argentina) F. Stupaczuk / (Argentina) Di Nenno	6	6
Q	(Argentina) L. Augsburger / (Argentina) V. Libaak	3	4
27	(Italy) D. Perino / (Spain) P.G. Rodrigo	3	4
10	(Brazil) L. Bergamini / (Spain) V. Ruiz	6	6
16	(Spain) G. Rubio / (Spain) J. Bautista	5	6
Q	(Spain) E. Chamero / (Chile) J. Valdes	7	7
Q	(Spain) A. Mercadal / (Belgium) C. Geens	2	1
7	(Spain) A. Ruiz / (Spain) Momo	6	6
8	(Argentina) Maxi / (Argentina) Sanyo	7	6
17	(Argentina) A. Gutierrez / (Spain) J. Rico	5	1
30	(Sweden) D. Windahl / (Spain) J. Marmolejo	4	6
11	(Spain) A. Arroyo / (Spain) E. Alonso	6	7
15	(Spain) J. Ruiz / (Spain) P. Cardona	7	5
19	(Spain) I. Sager / (Spain) S. Oria	5	6	*
Q	(Spain) A.R. Martinez / (Spain) D. Santigosa	2	2
2	(Spain) Galán / (Argentina) F. Chingotto	6	6

Round of 16
1	(Spain) Coello / (Argentina) Tapia	6	2	*
14	(Spain) J. Leal / (Brazil) L. Campagnolo	2	0
23	(Spain) J. Barahona / (Spain) T. Zapata	6	2	3
5	(Argentina) Belasteguin / (Argentina) J. Tello	4	6	6
6	(Spain) J. Garrido / (Spain) Yanguas	6	6
WC	(Argentina) F. Chiostri / (Argentina) M.S. Blasco	2	4
9	(Spain) Coki / (Spain) J. Sanz	6	6
3	(Spain) Lebrón / (Spain) Paquito	4	4
4	(Argentina) F. Stupaczuk / (Argentina) Di Nenno	6	6
10	(Brazil) L. Bergamini / (Spain) V. Ruiz	2	3
Q	(Spain) E. Chamero / (Chile) J. Valdes	1	4
7	(Spain) A. Ruiz / (Spain) Momo	6	6
8	(Argentina) Maxi / (Argentina) Sanyo	4	6	7
11	(Spain) A. Arroyo / (Spain) E. Alonso	6	3	5
19	(Spain) I. Sager / (Spain) S. Oria	5	0
2	(Spain) Galán / (Argentina) F. Chingotto	7	6

Quarter-Final
1	(Spain) Coello / (Argentina) Tapia	6	6
5	(Argentina) Belasteguin / (Argentina) J. Tello	3	1
6	(Spain) J. Garrido / (Spain) Yanguas	6	6
9	(Spain) Coki / (Spain) J. Sanz	4	1
4	(Argentina) F. Stupaczuk / (Argentina) Di Nenno	6	6
7	(Spain) A. Ruiz / (Spain) Momo	1	2
8	(Argentina) Maxi / (Argentina) Sanyo	3	3
2	(Spain) Galán / (Argentina) F. Chingotto	6	6

Semi-Finals
1	(Spain) Coello / (Argentina) Tapia	6	6	6
6	(Spain) J. Garrido / (Spain) Yanguas	3	7	2
4	(Argentina) F. Stupaczuk / (Argentina) Di Nenno	3	3
2	(Spain) Galán / (Argentina) F. Chingotto	6	6

Finals
1	(Spain) Coello / (Argentina) Tapia	6	2	2
2	(Spain) Galán / (Argentina) F. Chingotto	2	6	6

=== Women's Bracket ===
Round of 32
1	(Spain) A. Sanchez / (Spain) P. Josemaria	6	6
19	(Spain) J. Velasco / (Spain) N. Canovas	0	1
12	(Spain) B. Caldera / (Spain) L. Rufo	6	6
14	(Russia) K. Sharifova / (Spain) L. Martinez	3	3
17	(Spain) A. Martinez / (Spain) M. Guinart	6	6
Q	(Italy) C. Pappacena / (Spain) X. Vidiella	1	2
25	(Spain) A. Soriano / (Italy) C. Casali	0	3
7	(Portugal) S. Araújo / (Argentina) V. Riera	6	6
6	(Argentina) C. Jensen / (Spain) J. Castello	4	0
11	(Spain) A. Ustero / (Spain) A. Alonso	6	1	*
9	(Spain) B. Las Heras / (Spain) V. Iglesias	6	6
27	(Italy) G. Marchetti / (Spain) S. Pujals	3	4
LL	(Spain) A. Rojo / (Italy) L. Vano	2	4
16	(Spain) M.R. Abajo / (Spain) N. Rodriguez	6	6
21	(Spain) M. Merino / (Spain) S. Saiz	0	0
4	(Spain) A. Salazar / (Spain) T. Icardo	6	6
3	(Spain) C. Fernandez / (Spain) G. Triay	6	6
Q	(Brazil) M. Schuck / (Spain) M. Rivas	0	1
24	(Spain) A. Perez / (Spain) P. Martinez	6	7
WC	(Spain) A. Gracia / (Spain) L. Rodriguez	3	5
20	(Spain) C. Mesa / (Spain) S. Ruiz	6	6
15	(Spain) E. Carnicero / (Spain) M. Lobo	2	2
Q	(Spain) L. Manquillo / (Spain) N. Aguilar	4	2
8	(Spain) L. Sainz / (Spain) P. Llaguno	6	6
5	(Spain) M. Ortega / (Spain) V. Virseda	6	6
18	(France) A. Collombon / (Argentina) J. Bidahorria	2	2
22	(Spain) M. Barrera / (Spain) M. Caparros	2	6
10	(Argentina) A. Osoro / (Italy) C. Orsi	6	7
26	(Spain) M. Borrero / (Spain) S. Bellver	6	6	7
23	(Spain) A. Cañellas / (Spain) T. Navarro	7	4	6
Q	(Spain) M. Goyenche / (Spain) R. Barrera	2	5
2	(Spain) B. González / (Argentina) D. Brea	6	7

Round of 16
1	(Spain) A. Sanchez / (Spain) P. Josemaria	6	7
12	(Spain) B. Caldera / (Spain) L. Rufo	2	5
17	(Spain) A. Martinez / (Spain) M. Guinart	2	1
7	(Portugal) S. Araújo / (Argentina) V. Riera	6	6
11	(Spain) A. Ustero / (Spain) A. Alonso	6	3	6
9	(Spain) B. Las Heras / (Spain) V. Iglesias	2	6	2
16	(Spain) M.R. Abajo / (Spain) N. Rodriguez	2	5
4	(Spain) A. Salazar / (Spain) T. Icardo	6	7
3	(Spain) C. Fernandez / (Spain) G. Triay	6	6
24	(Spain) A. Perez / (Spain) P. Martinez
20	(Spain) C. Mesa / (Spain) S. Ruiz	4	3
8	(Spain) L. Sainz / (Spain) P. Llaguno	6	6
5	(Spain) M. Ortega / (Spain) V. Virseda	6	6
10	(Argentina) A. Osoro / (Italy) C. Orsi	4	4
26	(Spain) M. Borrero / (Spain) S. Bellver	0	4
2	(Spain) B. González / (Argentina) D. Brea	6	6

Quarter-Final
1	(Spain) A. Sanchez / (Spain) P. Josemaria	7	6
7	(Portugal) S. Araújo / (Argentina) V. Riera	5	0
11	(Spain) A. Ustero / (Spain) A. Alonso	6	7
4	(Spain) A. Salazar / (Spain) T. Icardo	1	5
3	(Spain) C. Fernandez / (Spain) G. Triay	6	6
8	(Spain) L. Sainz / (Spain) P. Llaguno	0	4
5	(Spain) M. Ortega / (Spain) V. Virseda	6	1	3
2	(Spain) B. González / (Argentina) D. Brea	4	6	6

Semi-Finals
1	(Spain) A. Sanchez / (Spain) P. Josemaria	6	6
11	(Spain) A. Ustero / (Spain) A. Alonso	2	3
3	(Spain) C. Fernandez / (Spain) G. Triay	2	7	5
2	(Spain) B. González / (Argentina) D. Brea	6	6	7

Finals
1	(Spain) A. Sanchez / (Spain) P. Josemaria	6	5	6
2	(Spain) B. González / (Argentina) D. Brea	1	7	4

== Results ==
=== First Round ===
Men's

Date	Winners	Score	Opponent	Refs.
20/5/2024	(Argentina) Cristian German Gutiérrez (Spain) Jorge Ruiz Gutiérrez	6–3 / 6–1	(Argentina) Agustin Gomez Silingo (Portugal) Gustavo Nunes	
20/5/2024	(Spain) Alvaro Melendez Amaya (Spain) Pedro Melendez Amaya	6–3 / 4–6 / 6–4	(Spain) Diego Gil Batista (Spain) Raúl Marcos Duran	
20/5/2024	(Spain) Javier Gonzalez Barahona (Spain) Teodoro Zapata	6–4 / 3–6 / 6–4	(Spain) Ignacio Vilariño (Spain) Miguel Semmler	
20/5/2024	(Spain) Jose García Diestro (Spain) Pablo Lijó	7–5 / 6–4	(Argentina) Gonzalo Alfonso (Argentina) Leonel Aguirre	
20/5/2024	(Spain) Pol Hernandez (Argentina) Ramiro Valenzuela	6–2 / 6–4	(Spain) Carlos Marti (Spain) Miguel Angel Solbes	
20/5/2024	(Argentina) Federico Chiostri (Argentina) Maxi Sanchez Blasco	7–6 / 6–2	(Spain) Arnau Ayats (Spain) Francisco Guerrero	
20/5/2024	(Spain) Juan Cruz Belluati (Argentina) Miguel Lamperti	7–6 / 7–5	(Spain) Antón Sans (Spain) David Gala Sanchez	
20/5/2024	(Spain) Álvero Cepero (Spain) Miguel Benítez	7–5 / 6–3	(Spain) Ivan Ramirez (Spain) Jose Jimenez Casas	
20/5/2024	(Argentina) Leandro Augsburger (Argentina) Valentino Libaak	6–2 / 6–7 / 7–5	(Spain) Javier García Mora (Spain) Jaime Muñoz	
20/5/2024	(Italy) Denis Perino (Spain) Pablo García Rodrigo	6–3 / 6–0	(Italy) Aris Patiniotis (Italy) Facundo Dominguez	
20/5/2024	(Spain) Emilio Sanchez Chamero (Chile) Javier Valdes	6–4 / 7–6	(Portugal) Nuno Deus (Italy) Simone Cremona	
20/5/2024	(Spain) Adriá Mercadal (Belgium) Clement Geens	6–2 / 7–6	(Spain) Fran Ramirez (Portugal) Miguel Deus	
20/5/2024	(Argentina) Agustin Gutiérrez (Spain) José Rico	6–3 / 6–1	(Spain) Antonio Luque (Spain) Jose Luis Gonzalez	
20/5/2024	(Sweden) Daniel Windahl (Spain) Jose Solano Marmolejo	4–6 / 6–4 / 6–4	(Spain) Jose Sanchez Serrano (Spain) Mario Ortega	
20/5/2024	(Spain) Ignacio Sager (Spain) Salvador Oria	4–6 / 6–3 / 7–5	(Spain) Javier Martinez Vazquez (Spain) Pincho Fernandez	
20/5/2024	(Spain) Alonso Rodriguez (Spain) Daniel Santigosa	6–3 / 7–5	(Spain) Enrique Goenaga (Spain) Juanlu Esbri	

=== Round of 32 ===
Men's

Date	Winners	Score	Opponent	Refs.
22/5/2024	(Argentina) Agustín Tapia (Spain) Arturo Coello	6–1 / 6–3	(Argentina) Cristian German Gutiérrez (Spain) Jorge Ruiz Gutiérrez	
22/5/2024	(Spain) Javier Leal (Brazil) Lucas Campagnolo	6–3 / 6–2	(Spain) Alvaro Melendez Amaya (Spain) Pedro Melendez Amaya	
21/5/2024	(Spain) Javier Gonzalez Barahona (Spain) Teodoro Zapata	6–3 / 6–3	(Argentina) Alex Chozas (Argentina) Lucho Capra	
22/5/2024	(Argentina) Fernando Belasteguín (Argentina) Juan Ignacio Tello	7–6 / 4–6 / 7–5	(Spain) Jose García Diestro (Spain) Pablo Lijó	
22/5/2024	(Spain) Javi Garrido (Spain) Mike Yanguas	5–7 / 6–2 / 6–4	(Spain) Pol Hernandez (Argentina) Ramiro Valenzuela	
21/5/2024	(Argentina) Federico Chiostri (Argentina) Maxi Sanchez Blasco	6–3 / 2–6 / 7–6	(Spain) Francisco Gil Morales (Argentina) Ramiro Moyano	
21/5/2024	(Spain) Coki Nieto (Spain) Jon Sanz	6–3 / 7–5	(Spain) Juan Cruz Belluati (Argentina) Miguel Lamperti	
22/5/2024	(Spain) Juan Lebrón (Spain) Paquito Navarro	4–6 / 7–6 / 6–2	(Spain) Álvero Cepero (Spain) Miguel Benítez	
22/5/2024	(Argentina) Franco Stupaczuk (Argentina) Martin Di Nenno	6–3 / 6–4	(Argentina) Leandro Augsburger (Argentina) Valentino Libaak	
21/5/2024	(Brazil) Lucas Bergamini (Spain) Víctor Ruiz	6–3 / 6–4	(Italy) Denis Perino (Spain) Pablo García Rodrigo	
21/5/2024	(Spain) Emilio Sanchez Chamero (Chile) Javier Valdes	7–5 / 7–6	(Spain) Gonzalo Rubio (Spain) Jairo Bautista	
22/5/2024	(Spain) Aléx Ruiz (Spain) Momo Gonzalez	6–2 / 6–1	(Spain) Adriá Mercadal (Belgium) Clement Geens	
21/5/2024	(Argentina) Maxi Sánchez (Argentina) Sanyo Gutiérrez	7–5 / 6–1	(Argentina) Agustin Gutiérrez (Spain) José Rico	
21/5/2024	(Spain) Alejandro Arroyo (Spain) Eduardo Alonso	6–4 / 7–6	(Sweden) Daniel Windahl (Spain) Jose Solano Marmolejo	
21/5/2024	(Spain) Ignacio Sager (Spain) Salvador Oria	5–7 / 6–5 / W.O.	(Spain) Javier Ruiz (Spain) Pablo Cardona	
22/5/2024	(Spain) Alejandro Galán (Argentina) Federico Chingotto	6–2 / 6–2	(Spain) Alonso Rodriguez (Spain) Daniel Santigosa	

Women's

Date	Winners	Score	Opponent	Refs.
22/5/2024	(Spain) Ariana Sánchez (Spain) Paula Josemaria	6–0 / 6–1	(Spain) Jimena Velasco (Spain) Noa Canovas	
21/5/2024	(Spain) Beatriz Caldera (Spain) Lorena Rufo	6–3 / 6–3	(Russia) Ksenia Sharifova (Spain) Lucía Martínez	
21/5/2024	(Spain) Araceli Martinez (Spain) Marina Guinart	6–1 / 6–2	(Italy) Chiara Pappacena (Spain) Xenia Clasca	
22/5/2024	(Portugal) Sofia Araújo (Argentina) Virginia Riera	6–0 / 6–3	(Spain) Arantxa Soriano Perez (Italy) Carlotta Casali	
21/5/2024	(Spain) Alejandra Alonso (Spain) Andrea Ustero	6–4 / 1–0 / W.O.	(Argentina) Claudia Jensen (Spain) Jessica Castelló	
21/5/2024	(Spain) Barbara Las Heras (Spain) Victoria Iglesias	6–3 / 6–4	(Italy) Giorgia Marchetti (Spain) Sara Pujals	
22/5/2024	(Spain) Laia Rodriguez Abajo (Spain) Nuria Rodriguez	6–2 / 6–4	(Spain) Alicia Blanco Rojo (Italy) Lorena Vano	
21/5/2024	(Spain) Alejandra Salazar (Spain) Tamara Icardo	6–0 / 6–0	(Spain) Melania Merino (Spain) Sofía Saiz	
22/5/2024	(Spain) Claudia Fernandez (Spain) Gemma Triay	6–0 / 6–1	(Brazil) Manuela Schuck (Spain) Mónica Gomez Rivas	
21/5/2024	(Spain) Agueda Perez (Spain) Patricia Martínez	6–3 / 7–5	(Spain) Ana Dominguez Gracia (Spain) Laura Lujan Rodriguez	
22/5/2024	(Spain) Carla Mesa (Spain) Sara Ruiz	6–2 / 6–2	(Spain) Esther Carnicero (Spain) Marina Martinez Lobo	
21/5/2024	(Spain) Lucia Sainz (Spain) Patty Llaguno	6–4 / 6–2	(Spain) Letizia Manquillo (Spain) Noemi Aguilar	
22/5/2024	(Spain) Marta Ortega (Spain) Verónica Virseda	6–2 / 6–2	(France) Alix Collombon (Argentina) Julieta Bidahorria	
22/5/2024	(Argentina) Aranzazu Osoro (Italy) Carolina Orsi	6–2 / 7–6	(Spain) Marta Barrera (Spain) Marta Caparrós	
21/5/2024	(Spain) Marta Borrero (Spain) Sandra Bellver	6–7 / 6–4 / 7–6	(Spain) Ariadna Cañellas (Spain) Teresa Navarro	
22/5/2024	(Spain) Bea González (Argentina) Delfina Brea	6–2 / 7–5	(Argentina) Martina Fassio (Spain) Raquel Eugenio Barrera	

=== Round of 16 ===
Men's

Date	Winners	Score	Opponent	Refs.
23/5/2024	(Argentina) Agustín Tapia (Spain) Arturo Coello	6–0 / 2–1 / W.O.	(Spain) Javier Leal (Brazil) Lucas Campagnolo	
23/5/2024	(Argentina) Fernando Belasteguín (Argentina) Juan Ignacio Tello	4–6 / 6–2 / 6–3	(Spain) Javier Gonzalez Barahona (Spain) Teodoro Zapata	
23/5/2024	(Spain) Javi Garrido (Spain) Mike Yanguas	6–2 / 6–4	(Argentina) Federico Chiostri (Argentina) Maxi Sanchez Blasco	
23/5/2024	(Spain) Coki Nieto (Spain) Jon Sanz	6–4 / 6–4	(Spain) Juan Lebrón (Spain) Paquito Navarro	
23/5/2024	(Argentina) Franco Stupaczuk (Argentina) Martin Di Nenno	6–2 / 6–3	(Brazil) Lucas Bergamini (Spain) Víctor Ruiz	
23/5/2024	(Spain) Aléx Ruiz (Spain) Momo Gonzalez	6–1 / 6–4	(Spain) Emilio Sanchez Chamero (Chile) Javier Valdes	
23/5/2024	(Argentina) Maxi Sánchez (Argentina) Sanyo Gutiérrez	4–6 / 6–3 / 7–5	(Spain) Alejandro Arroyo (Spain) Eduardo Alonso	
23/5/2024	(Spain) Alejandro Galán (Argentina) Federico Chingotto	7–5 / 6–0	(Spain) Ignacio Sager (Spain) Salvador Oria	

Women's

Date	Winners	Score	Opponent	Refs.
23/5/2024	(Spain) Ariana Sánchez (Spain) Paula Josemaria	6–2 / 7–5	(Spain) Beatriz Caldera (Spain) Lorena Rufo	
23/5/2024	(Portugal) Sofia Araújo (Argentina) Virginia Riera	6–2 / 6–1	(Spain) Araceli Martinez (Spain) Marina Guinart	
23/5/2024	(Spain) Alejandra Alonso (Spain) Andrea Ustero	6–2 / 3–6 / 6–2	(Spain) Barbara Las Heras (Spain) Victoria Iglesias	
23/5/2024	(Spain) Alejandra Salazar (Spain) Tamara Icardo	6–2 / 7–5	(Spain) Laia Rodriguez Abajo (Spain) Nuria Rodriguez	
23/5/2024	(Spain) Claudia Fernandez (Spain) Gemma Triay	6–2 / 6–0	(Spain) Agueda Perez (Spain) Patricia Martínez	
23/5/2024	(Spain) Lucia Sainz (Spain) Patty Llaguno	6–4 / 6–3	(Spain) Carla Mesa (Spain) Sara Ruiz	
23/5/2024	(Spain) Marta Ortega (Spain) Verónica Virseda	6–4 / 6–4	(Argentina) Aranzazu Osoro (Italy) Carolina Orsi	
23/5/2024	(Spain) Bea González (Argentina) Delfina Brea	6–0 / 6–4	(Spain) Marta Borrero (Spain) Sandra Bellver	

=== Quarter-Finals ===
Men's

Date	Winners	Score	Opponent	Refs.
24/5/2024	(Argentina) Agustín Tapia (Spain) Arturo Coello	6–3 / 6–1	(Argentina) Fernando Belasteguín (Argentina) Juan Ignacio Tello	
24/5/2024	(Spain) Javi Garrido (Spain) Mike Yanguas	6–4 / 6–1	(Spain) Coki Nieto (Spain) Jon Sanz	
24/5/2024	(Argentina) Franco Stupaczuk (Argentina) Martin Di Nenno	6–1 / 6–2	(Spain) Aléx Ruiz (Spain) Momo Gonzalez	
24/5/2024	(Spain) Alejandro Galán (Argentina) Federico Chingotto	6–3 / 6–3	(Argentina) Maxi Sánchez (Argentina) Sanyo Gutiérrez	

Women's

Date	Winners	Score	Opponent	Refs.
24/5/2024	(Spain) Ariana Sánchez (Spain) Paula Josemaria	7–5 / 6–0	(Portugal) Sofia Araújo (Argentina) Virginia Riera	
24/5/2024	(Spain) Alejandra Alonso (Spain) Andrea Ustero	6–1 / 7–5	(Spain) Alejandra Salazar (Spain) Tamara Icardo	
24/5/2024	(Spain) Claudia Fernandez (Spain) Gemma Triay	6–0 / 6–4	(Spain) Lucia Sainz (Spain) Patty Llaguno	
24/5/2024	(Spain) Bea González (Argentina) Delfina Brea	4–6 / 6–1 / 6–3	(Spain) Marta Ortega (Spain) Verónica Virseda	

=== Semi-Finals ===
Men's

Date	Winners	Score	Opponent	Refs.
25/5/2024	(Argentina) Agustín Tapia (Spain) Arturo Coello	6–3 / 6–7 / 6–2	(Spain) Javi Garrido (Spain) Mike Yanguas	
25/5/2024	(Spain) Alejandro Galán (Argentina) Federico Chingotto	6–3 / 6–3	(Argentina) Franco Stupaczuk (Argentina) Martin Di Nenno	

Women's

Date	Winners	Score	Opponent	Refs.
25/5/2024	(Spain) Ariana Sánchez (Spain) Paula Josemaria	6–2 / 6–3	(Spain) Alejandra Alonso (Spain) Andrea Ustero	
25/5/2024	(Spain) Bea González (Argentina) Delfina Brea	6–2 / 6–7 / 7–5	(Spain) Claudia Fernandez (Spain) Gemma Triay	

=== Finals ===
Men's

Date	Winners	Score	Opponent	Refs.
26/5/2024	(Spain) Alejandro Galán (Argentina) Federico Chingotto	2–6 / 6–2 / 6–2	(Argentina) Agustín Tapia (Spain) Arturo Coello	

Women's

Date	Winners	Score	Opponent	Refs.
26/5/2024	(Spain) Ariana Sánchez (Spain) Paula Josemaria	6–1 / 5–7 / 6–4	(Spain) Bea González (Argentina) Delfina Brea	
