= Morocco women's national handball team =

Morocco

Information
- Association: Royal Moroccan Handball Federation

Colours
1st	2nd

Results

African Championship
- Appearances: 5 (First in 1987)
- Best result: 8th (1987)
- Last updated on Unknown.

Morocco women's national handball team
Medal record

Arab Games
Bronze medal – third place	1961 Morocco	

The Morocco women's national handball team is the national team of Morocco. It is governed by the Royal Moroccan Handball Federation and takes part in international handball competitions.

== Competitive record ==
=== African Championship ===
Year	Reached	Position	GP	W	D*	L	GS	GA	GD
(Tunisia) 1974
(Algeria) 1976
(Republic of the Congo) 1979
(Tunisia) 1981
(Egypt) 1983
(Angola) 1985
(Morocco) 1987	main round	8th	4	0	0	4	35	98	-63
(Algeria) 1989
(Egypt) 1991
(Ivory Coast) 1992
(Tunisia) 1994
(Benin) 1996
(South Africa) 1998
(Algeria) 2000
(Morocco) 2002	main round	9th	3	0	0	3	35	84	-49
(Egypt) Cairo 2004
(Tunisia) Tunis/Radès 2006
(Angola) three cities 2008
(Egypt) Cairo/Suez 2010
(Morocco) Salé 2012	main round	10th	5	0	0	5	58	158	-100
(Algeria) Algiers 2014
(Angola) Luanda 2016
(Republic of the Congo) Brazzaville 2018	main round	10th	5	0	0	5	113	201	-112
(Cameroon) Yaoundé 2021
(Senegal) Dakar 2022	main round	11th	6	1	0	5	144	178	-34
(Democratic Republic of the Congo) Kinshasa 2024
(Tunisia) Nabeul/Hammamet 2026	Qualified								
Total	6/27	0 titles	23	1	0	22	385	719	-334

=== African Games ===
Edition	Round	Position	Pld	W	D	L	GF	GA	GD
2019 Morocco	Quarterfinals	7th place	7	2	0	5	179	229	-50
Total	1/13	0 Titles	7	2	0	5	179	229	-50

=== Jugeos de Solidaridad Islamica ===
Edition	Round	Position	Pld	W	D	L	GF	GA	GD
1961 Morocco	round final	3rd	3	1	0	2	40	37	+3
Total	1/13	0 Titles	3	1	0	2	40	37	+3

=== Green March International League ===
Edition	Round	Position
(Morocco) 2025	Final Phase	3º Place

== Competitions U20 ==
=== African Championship ===
Edition	Position	GP	W	D*	L	GS	GA	GD
Tunisia 1988	5th							
Total	1/16	0 Titles	0	0	0	0	0	0

== Competitions U18 ==
=== African Championship ===
Edition	Position	GP	W	D*	L	GS	GA	GD
Tunisia 2023	6th	5	2	0	3	102	149	-47
Total	1/10	0 Titles	2	0	3	102	149	-47

== Moroccan team ==
No	Player	Positión	Club	Country
77	Magiba Farari	Portera	Harnes HBC	France
19	Mounia Benkdir	Lateral Derecha	Balonmano Cergy	France
92	Kim Doucet	Pivote	Montluçon	France
14	Imane Ben Chayhab	Lateral Derecha	Thuir Handball	France
91	Sanaa Mafsal	Pivote	SCA 2000 Evry	France
86	Nawal Hatta	Lateral Derecha	Bergerac Périgord Pourpre Handball	France
13	Alicia Zouiguira	Extrema Izquierda	Harnes HBC	France
87	Aicha Echaouki	Extrema Derecha	Noisy-le-Grand handball	France
2	Sara Hajji	Central	Amager SK	Denmark
20	Schaima Abidi	Extrema derecha	CA Bègles	France
6	Ouardia Aachour	Extrema Izquierda	Draveil HB	France
20	Nina Belkacemi	Extrema Izquierda	Narbona	France
10	Inés Jlida	Extrema Izquierda	Tolón MVH	France
3	Amal Belkhadiri	Extrema Derecha	CBSH Guelmim	Morocco
31	Sarah El Morsli	Pivot	Frontignan Thau	France
94	Hasna Ait Abdelkrim	Pivot	Conflans de HBC	France

Entrenador: (France) Moner Haryouli
