= Odeth Tavares =

Angolan handball player

Personal information
- Full name: Maria Odeth Tavares
- Nationality: Angolan
- Born: 18 June 1976 (age 50) Benguela, Angola
- Height: 1.70 m (5 ft 7 in)

Sport
- Sport: Handball
- Position: Goalkeeper

Senior clubs
- Years: Team
- 1987-: Nacional de Benguela
- 2000–2002: Académica do Lobito
- 2002-: ASA
- 2002-2004: G.D. ENANA
- 2004-2012: 1º de Agosto
National team
- Years: Team
- –: Angola
Medal record
African Championship
Gold medal – first place	Algeria 2000	National Team
Gold medal – first place	Casablanca 2002	National Team
Gold medal – first place	Cairo 2004	National Team
Gold medal – first place	Tunis 2006	National Team
Gold medal – first place	Luanda 2008	National Team
Gold medal – first place	Cairo 2010	National Team
Gold medal – first place	Salé 2012	National Team
All-Africa Games
Gold medal – first place	Maputo 2011	National Team

Maria Odeth Tavares (born 18 August 1976) is a retired Angolan team handball goalkeeper. She is 5'7" and 165 lbs and last played for Primeiro de Agosto.

== 2009 World Cup ==
Odeth Tavares was the top goalkeeper at the 2009 Women's World Cup in China.

== Summer Olympics ==
Tavares wore the #1 jersey with Angola at the 2000 and 2004 Summer olympics.
