= Handball at the 2019 African Games – Women's tournament =

Women's handball at the 2019 African Games
Tournament details
- Host country: Morocco
- Venues: 2 (in 1 host city)
- Dates: 20–29 August
- Teams: 10 (from 1 confederation)

Final positions
- Champions: Angola (7th title)
- Runners-up: Cameroon
- Third place: DR Congo
- Fourth place: Guinea

Tournament statistics
- Matches played: 32

The women's handball tournament at the 2019 African Games was held from 20 to 29 August at the Mohammed V Sports Complex and Sports Center Ibrahim Zahare in Casablanca.

== Group stage ==
All times are local (UTC+1).

=== Group A ===
Pos	Team	Pld	W	D	L	GF	GA	GD	Pts	Qualification
1	Angola	4	4	0	0	135	67	+68	8	Quarterfinals
2	DR Congo	4	3	0	1	121	96	+25	6	Quarterfinals
3	Guinea	4	2	0	2	104	113	−9	4	Quarterfinals
4	Morocco (H)	4	1	0	3	91	143	−52	2	Quarterfinals
5	Nigeria	4	0	0	4	87	119	−32	0	9th place game

Source: AG 2019
Rules for classification: 1) Points; 2) Head-to-head points; 3) Head-to-head goal difference; 4) Head-to-head goals scored; 5) Goal difference; 6) Goals scored; 7) Draw.
(H) Hosts

20 August 2019; 12:00	Angola	30–19	Guinea	Sports Center Ibrahim Zahare
20 August 2019; 12:00		(14–7)		Sports Center Ibrahim Zahare

20 August 2019; 16:00	Nigeria	20–26	Morocco	Sports Center Ibrahim Zahare
20 August 2019; 16:00		(9–15)		Sports Center Ibrahim Zahare

21 August 2019; 16:00	Morocco	25–45	DR Congo	Mohammed V Sports Complex
21 August 2019; 16:00		(12–23)		Mohammed V Sports Complex

21 August 2019; 18:00	Angola	33–16	Nigeria	Sports Center Ibrahim Zahare
21 August 2019; 18:00		(16–7)		Sports Center Ibrahim Zahare

22 August 2019; 14:00	Morocco	11–45	Angola	Mohammed V Sports Complex
22 August 2019; 14:00		(4–29)		Mohammed V Sports Complex

22 August 2019; 16:00	Guinea	21–26	DR Congo	Sports Center Ibrahim Zahare
22 August 2019; 16:00		(12–14)		Sports Center Ibrahim Zahare

24 August 2019; 16:00	DR Congo	29–23	Nigeria	Mohammed V Sports Complex
24 August 2019; 16:00		(20–9)		Mohammed V Sports Complex

24 August 2019; 18:00	Guinea	33–29	Morocco	Sports Center Ibrahim Zahare
24 August 2019; 18:00		(18–13)		Sports Center Ibrahim Zahare

25 August 2019; 14:00	Guinea	31–28	Nigeria	Sports Center Ibrahim Zahare
25 August 2019; 14:00		(14–13)		Sports Center Ibrahim Zahare

25 August 2019; 16:00	Angola	27–21	DR Congo	Sports Center Ibrahim Zahare
25 August 2019; 16:00		(14–12)		Sports Center Ibrahim Zahare

=== Group B ===
Pos	Team	Pld	W	D	L	GF	GA	GD	Pts	Qualification
1	Cameroon	4	4	0	0	155	94	+61	8	Quarterfinals
2	Algeria	4	3	0	1	113	110	+3	6	Quarterfinals
3	Tunisia	4	2	0	2	135	106	+29	4	Quarterfinals
4	Uganda	4	1	0	3	79	119	−40	2	Quarterfinals
5	Kenya	4	0	0	4	72	125	−53	0	9th place game

Source: AG 2019
Rules for classification: 1) Points; 2) Head-to-head points; 3) Head-to-head goal difference; 4) Head-to-head goals scored; 5) Goal difference; 6) Goals scored; 7) Draw.

20 August 2019; 12:00	Cameroon	33–26	Algeria	Mohammed V Sports Complex
20 August 2019; 12:00		(16–11)		Mohammed V Sports Complex

20 August 2019; 14:00	Uganda	10–0; Forfeit	Kenya	Sports Center Ibrahim Zahare

21 August 2019; 14:00	Cameroon	43–22	Uganda	Sports Center Ibrahim Zahare
21 August 2019; 14:00		(22–13)		Sports Center Ibrahim Zahare

21 August 2019; 16:00	Kenya	26–43	Tunisia	Sports Center Ibrahim Zahare
21 August 2019; 16:00		(11–19)		Sports Center Ibrahim Zahare

22 August 2019; 14:00	Kenya	21–44	Cameroon	Sports Center Ibrahim Zahare
22 August 2019; 14:00		(10–22)		Sports Center Ibrahim Zahare

22 August 2019; 18:00	Algeria	26–24	Tunisia	Sports Center Ibrahim Zahare
22 August 2019; 18:00		(15–12)		Sports Center Ibrahim Zahare

24 August 2019; 14:00	Algeria	28–25	Kenya	Sports Center Ibrahim Zahare
24 August 2019; 14:00		(14–12)		Sports Center Ibrahim Zahare

24 August 2019; 16:00	Tunisia	43–19	Uganda	Sports Center Ibrahim Zahare
24 August 2019; 16:00		(21–11)		Sports Center Ibrahim Zahare

25 August 2019; 12:00	Algeria	33–28	Uganda	Mohammed V Sports Complex
25 August 2019; 12:00		(12–13)		Mohammed V Sports Complex

25 August 2019; 18:00	Cameroon	35–25	Tunisia	Sports Center Ibrahim Zahare
25 August 2019; 18:00		(16–12)		Sports Center Ibrahim Zahare

== Knockout stage ==
=== Bracket ===
Quarterfinals
26 August
Angola	36
Uganda	12
26 August
Algeria	27
Guinea	29
26 August
DR Congo	36
Tunisia	25
26 August
Morocco	29
Cameroon	47

Semifinals
28 August
Angola	31
Guinea	14
28 August
DR Congo	25
Cameroon	30

Final
29 August
Angola	28
Cameroon	25
Third place
29 August
Guinea	22
DR Congo	32

5–8th place bracket

5–8th place semifinals
28 August
Uganda	24
Algeria	34
28 August
Tunisia	34
Morocco	25

Fifth place
29 August
Algeria	24
Tunisia	28
Seventh place
29 August
Uganda	29
Morocco	34

=== Quarterfinals ===
26 August 2019; 12:00	Algeria	27–29	Guinea	Sports Center Ibrahim Zahare
26 August 2019; 12:00		(15–10)		Sports Center Ibrahim Zahare

26 August 2019; 14:00	Angola	36–12	Uganda	Sports Center Ibrahim Zahare
26 August 2019; 14:00		(19–6)		Sports Center Ibrahim Zahare

26 August 2019; 16:00	Morocco	29–47	Cameroon	Sports Center Ibrahim Zahare
26 August 2019; 16:00		(18–26)		Sports Center Ibrahim Zahare

26 August 2019; 18:00	DR Congo	36–25	Tunisia	Sports Center Ibrahim Zahare
26 August 2019; 18:00		(16–13)		Sports Center Ibrahim Zahare

=== 5–8th place semifinals ===
28 August 2019; 12:00	Uganda	24–34	Algeria	Sports Center Ibrahim Zahare
28 August 2019; 12:00		(13–15)		Sports Center Ibrahim Zahare

28 August 2019; 14:00	Tunisia	34–25	Morocco	Sports Center Ibrahim Zahare
28 August 2019; 14:00		(15–12)		Sports Center Ibrahim Zahare

=== Semifinals ===
28 August 2019; 11:30	Angola	31–14	Guinea	Mohammed V Sports Complex
28 August 2019; 11:30		(14–6)		Mohammed V Sports Complex

28 August 2019; 16:30	DR Congo	25–30	Cameroon	Mohammed V Sports Complex
28 August 2019; 16:30		(11–18)		Mohammed V Sports Complex

=== Ninth place game ===
28 August 2019; 10:00	Nigeria	31–27	Kenya	Sports Center Ibrahim Zahare
28 August 2019; 10:00		(17–13)		Sports Center Ibrahim Zahare

=== Seventh place game ===
29 August 2019; 10:00	Uganda	29–34	Morocco	Sports Center Ibrahim Zahare
29 August 2019; 10:00		(14–15)		Sports Center Ibrahim Zahare

=== Fifth place game ===
29 August 2019; 14:00	Algeria	24–28	Tunisia	Sports Center Ibrahim Zahare
29 August 2019; 14:00		(11–15)		Sports Center Ibrahim Zahare

=== Third place game ===
29 August 2019; 13:00	Guinea	22–32	DR Congo	Mohammed V Sports Complex
29 August 2019; 13:00		(9–16)		Mohammed V Sports Complex

=== Final ===
29 August 2019; 17:00	Angola	28–25	Cameroon	Mohammed V Sports Complex
29 August 2019; 17:00		(15–10)		Mohammed V Sports Complex

== Final standing ==
Rank	Team
1st place, gold medalist(s)	Angola
2nd place, silver medalist(s)	Cameroon
3rd place, bronze medalist(s)	DR Congo
4	Guinea
5	Tunisia
6	Algeria
7	Morocco
8	Uganda
9	Nigeria
10	Kenya
