= Isabel Guialo =

Angolan handball player

Personal information
- Full name: Isabel Evelize Wangimba Guialo
- Nationality: Angolan
- Born: 8 April 1990 (age 36) Luanda, Angola
- Height: 1.80 m (5 ft 11 in)

Sport
- Sport: Handball
- Position: Centre back
- Current club: C.D. Primeiro de Agosto
- Number: 90

Senior clubs
- Years: Team
- 2013–2014: C.D. Primeiro de Agosto
- 2014–2015: Mecalia Atlético Guardés
- 2015–2018: C.D. Primeiro de Agosto
- 2018–2019: Kisvárdai KC
- 2019–2020: C.D. Primeiro de Agosto
- 2020–2021: Fleury Loiret HB
- 2021–2022: C.D. Primeiro de Agosto
- 2022–2023: Rapid Bucharest
- 2023–: C.D. Primeiro de Agosto
National team
Years	Team	Apps	(Gls)
–	Angola	101	(324)
Medal record
African Championship
Gold medal – first place	2010 Cairo
Gold medal – first place	2012 Salé
Gold medal – first place	2016 Luanda
Gold medal – first place	2018 Brazzaville
Gold medal – first place	2021 Yaoundé
Gold medal – first place	2022 Dakar
African Games
Gold medal – first place	2011 Maputo	Team
Gold medal – first place	2015 Brazzaville	Team
Gold medal – first place	2019 Rabat	Team
- Updated on 10 November 2025

Isabel Evelize Wangimba Guialo, nicknamed Belinha (born 8 April 1990) is an Angolan handball player for C.D. Primeiro de Agosto and the Angolan national team.

She participated at the 2011 World Women's Handball Championship in Brazil, the 2012 Summer Olympics, the 2013 World Women's Handball Championship and the 2016 Summer Olympics.

In 2017, she was voted best player of the 2017 Angola Women's Handball League.

== Achievements ==
- Carpathian Trophy:
  - Winner: 2019
