= Fatma Bouri =

Tunisian handball player

Personal information
- Nationality: Tunisian
- Born: 29 January 1993 (age 33)
- Height: 1.79 m (5 ft 10 in)

Sport
- Sport: Handball
- Position: Left wing
- Current club: Club Africain
- Number: 7
National team
Years	Team	Apps	(Gls)
–	Tunisia	30	(32)
Medal record
African Championship
Bronze medal – third place	2021 Yaoundé
Mediterranean Games
Silver medal – second place	2026 Taranto	Team
- Updated on 27 November 2025

Fatma Bouri (born 29 January 1993) is a Tunisian handball player for Club Africain and the Tunisian national team.

She participated at the 2017 and the 2025 World Women's Handball Championship.
