= Sandrine Kibamba =

Congolese handball player

Sandrine Kabamba
Personal information
- Full name: Leontine Sandrine Kibamba Nkembo
- Nationality: Congolese
- Born: 5 June 1979 (age 47)
- Height: 1.69 m (5 ft 7 in)

Sport
- Sport: Handball
- Position: Pivot
- Current club: Olney Handball

Senior clubs
- Years: Team
- 2002-2007: US MIOS Beganos
- 2007-2010: Angoulême CH
- 2012-2017: Olney Handball
National team
- Years: Team
- –: Congo
- –: DR Congo
Medal record
Representing Congo
African Games
Silver medal – second place	2007 Algeria	Team
Representing DR Congo
African Women's Handball Championship
Silver medal – second place	2014 Algeria	Team

Leontine Sandrine Kibamba Nkembo (born 5 June 1979) is a Congolese former handball player. She represented both the Congolese and the DR Congo national team.

She represented Congo at the 2001 and 2009 World Women's Handball Championship.

She represented DR Congo at the 2013 World Women's Handball Championship.

At the 2006 African Women's Handball Championship she was part of the all-star team.
