= 2018 African Women's Handball Championship =

Tournament details
- Host country: Congo
- Venue: 1 (in 1 host city)
- Dates: 2–12 December
- Teams: 10 (from 1 confederation)

Final positions
- Champions: Angola (13th title)
- Runners-up: Senegal
- Third place: DR Congo
- Fourth place: Cameroon

Tournament statistics
- Matches played: 33
- Goals scored: 1,669 (50.58 per match)
- Top scorers: (Democratic Republic of the Congo) Christianne Mwasesa (63 goals)

Awards
- Best player: (Angola) Albertina Kassoma

The 2018 African Women's Handball Championship was the 23rd edition of the African Women's Handball Championship, which took place from 2 to 12 December 2018 in Brazzaville, Congo. The tournament was held under the aegis of African Handball Confederation and acted as the African qualifying tournament for the 2019 World Women's Handball Championship.

Angola defeated Senegal in the final to win their second straight and 13th overall title.

== Venue ==
Brazzaville	2018 African Women's Handball Championship is located in Republic of the Congo
Kintélé Sports Complex; Capacity: 10,134	2018 African Women's Handball Championship is located in Republic of the Congo

== Draw ==
The draw was held on 11 August 2018.

Group A	Group B
Tunisia; Cameroon; Ivory Coast; Senegal; Algeria	Angola; DR Congo; Congo; Guinea; Morocco

== Preliminary round ==
The schedule was announced on 19 November 2018.

All times are local (UTC+1).

=== Group A ===
Pos	Team	Pld	W	D	L	GF	GA	GD	Pts	Qualification
1	Senegal	4	4	0	0	116	83	+33	8	Quarterfinals
2	Cameroon	4	2	1	1	109	91	+18	5	Quarterfinals
3	Tunisia	4	1	2	1	105	103	+2	4	Quarterfinals
4	Algeria	4	1	1	2	91	116	−25	3	Quarterfinals
5	Ivory Coast	4	0	0	4	100	128	−28	0	

Source: CAHB
Rules for classification: 1) points; 2) head-to-head points; 3) head-to-head goal difference; 4) head-to-head number of goals scored; 5) goal difference.

2 December 2018; 09:00	Senegal	23–18	Cameroon	Kintélé Sports Complex, Brazzaville
2 December 2018; 09:00		(14–11)		Kintélé Sports Complex, Brazzaville

2 December 2018; 11:00	Algeria	27–25	Ivory Coast	Kintélé Sports Complex, Brazzaville
2 December 2018; 11:00		(14–12)		Kintélé Sports Complex, Brazzaville

3 December 2018; 13:00	Tunisia	21–26	Senegal	Kintélé Sports Complex, Brazzaville
3 December 2018; 13:00		(12–13)		Kintélé Sports Complex, Brazzaville

3 December 2018; 15:00	Cameroon	32–18	Algeria	Kintélé Sports Complex, Brazzaville
3 December 2018; 15:00		(12–8)		Kintélé Sports Complex, Brazzaville

4 December 2018; 13:00	Cameroon	34–25	Ivory Coast	Kintélé Sports Complex, Brazzaville
4 December 2018; 13:00		(17–11)		Kintélé Sports Complex, Brazzaville

4 December 2018; 17:00	Algeria	24–24	Tunisia	Kintélé Sports Complex, Brazzaville
4 December 2018; 17:00		(12–14)		Kintélé Sports Complex, Brazzaville

6 December 2018; 13:00	Senegal	35–22	Algeria	Kintélé Sports Complex, Brazzaville
6 December 2018; 13:00		(18–7)		Kintélé Sports Complex, Brazzaville

6 December 2018; 19:00	Ivory Coast	28–35	Tunisia	Kintélé Sports Complex, Brazzaville
6 December 2018; 19:00		(10–21)		Kintélé Sports Complex, Brazzaville

7 December 2018; 15:00	Ivory Coast	22–32	Senegal	Kintélé Sports Complex, Brazzaville
7 December 2018; 15:00		(4–16)		Kintélé Sports Complex, Brazzaville

7 December 2018; 17:00	Tunisia	25–25	Cameroon	Kintélé Sports Complex, Brazzaville
7 December 2018; 17:00		(10–15)		Kintélé Sports Complex, Brazzaville

=== Group B ===
Pos	Team	Pld	W	D	L	GF	GA	GD	Pts	Qualification
1	Angola	4	4	0	0	155	74	+81	8	Quarterfinals
2	DR Congo	4	2	1	1	123	103	+20	5 (Note: Congo 29–29 DR Congo)	Quarterfinals
3	Congo (H)	4	2	1	1	121	104	+17	5	Quarterfinals
4	Guinea	4	1	0	3	97	134	−37	2	Quarterfinals
5	Morocco	4	0	0	4	82	163	−81	0	

Source: CAHB
Rules for classification: 1) points; 2) head-to-head points; 3) head-to-head goal difference; 4) head-to-head number of goals scored; 5) goal difference.
(H) Hosts
Notes:

2 December 2018; 13:00	Angola	40–17	Guinea	Kintélé Sports Complex, Brazzaville
2 December 2018; 13:00		(24–7)		Kintélé Sports Complex, Brazzaville

2 December 2018; 17:30	Congo	36–23	Morocco	Kintélé Sports Complex, Brazzaville
2 December 2018; 17:30		(15–11)		Kintélé Sports Complex, Brazzaville

3 December 2018; 17:00	Morocco	23–35	DR Congo	Kintélé Sports Complex, Brazzaville
3 December 2018; 17:00		(9–20)		Kintélé Sports Complex, Brazzaville

3 December 2018; 19:00	Guinea	20–37	Congo	Kintélé Sports Complex, Brazzaville
3 December 2018; 19:00		(12–16)		Kintélé Sports Complex, Brazzaville

4 December 2018; 15:00	Morocco	14–50	Angola	Kintélé Sports Complex, Brazzaville
4 December 2018; 15:00		(4–26)		Kintélé Sports Complex, Brazzaville

4 December 2018; 19:00	Congo	29–29	DR Congo	Kintélé Sports Complex, Brazzaville
4 December 2018; 19:00		(13–19)		Kintélé Sports Complex, Brazzaville

6 December 2018; 15:00	Guinea	42–22	Morocco	Kintélé Sports Complex, Brazzaville
6 December 2018; 15:00		(21–10)		Kintélé Sports Complex, Brazzaville

6 December 2018; 17:00	DR Congo	24–33	Angola	Kintélé Sports Complex, Brazzaville
6 December 2018; 17:00		(14–19)		Kintélé Sports Complex, Brazzaville

7 December 2018; 13:00	DR Congo	35–18	Guinea	Kintélé Sports Complex, Brazzaville
7 December 2018; 13:00		(16–8)		Kintélé Sports Complex, Brazzaville

7 December 2018; 19:00	Angola	32–19	Congo	Kintélé Sports Complex, Brazzaville
7 December 2018; 19:00		(18–9)		Kintélé Sports Complex, Brazzaville

== Knockout stage ==
=== Bracket ===
Quarterfinals
9 December
Senegal	23
Guinea	16
9 December
DR Congo	37
Tunisia	30
9 December
Cameroon	22
Congo	21
9 December
Angola	41
Algeria	17

Semifinals
10 December
Senegal	22
DR Congo	21
10 December
Cameroon	16
Angola	25

Final
12 December
Senegal	14
Angola	19
Third place
12 December
DR Congo	33
Cameroon	22

5th place bracket

5–8th place semifinals
10 December
Guinea	26
Tunisia	30
10 December
Congo	24
Algeria	22

Fifth place
11 December
Tunisia	23
Congo	31
Seventh place
11 December
Guinea	34
Algeria	22

=== Quarterfinals ===
9 December 2018; 11:30	Senegal	23–16	Guinea	Kintélé Sports Complex, Brazzaville
9 December 2018; 11:30		(12–7)		Kintélé Sports Complex, Brazzaville

9 December 2018; 14:00	DR Congo	37–30	Tunisia	Kintélé Sports Complex, Brazzaville
9 December 2018; 14:00		(20–11)		Kintélé Sports Complex, Brazzaville

9 December 2018; 16:30	Algeria	17–41	Angola	Kintélé Sports Complex, Brazzaville
9 December 2018; 16:30		(6–21)		Kintélé Sports Complex, Brazzaville

9 December 2018; 19:00	Cameroon	22–21	Congo	Kintélé Sports Complex, Brazzaville
9 December 2018; 19:00		(12–10)		Kintélé Sports Complex, Brazzaville

=== 5–8th place semifinals ===
10 December 2018; 13:00	Guinea	26–30	Tunisia	Kintélé Sports Complex, Brazzaville
10 December 2018; 13:00		(16–15)		Kintélé Sports Complex, Brazzaville

10 December 2018; 15:00	Congo	24–22	Algeria	Kintélé Sports Complex, Brazzaville
10 December 2018; 15:00		(16–14)		Kintélé Sports Complex, Brazzaville

=== Semifinals ===
10 December 2018; 17:00	Senegal	22–21	DR Congo	Kintélé Sports Complex, Brazzaville
10 December 2018; 17:00		(11–9)		Kintélé Sports Complex, Brazzaville

10 December 2018; 19:00	Cameroon	16–25	Angola	Kintélé Sports Complex, Brazzaville
10 December 2018; 19:00		(8–15)		Kintélé Sports Complex, Brazzaville

=== Ninth place game ===
10 December 2018; 11:00	Ivory Coast	38–31	Morocco	Kintélé Sports Complex, Brazzaville
10 December 2018; 11:00		(18–12)		Kintélé Sports Complex, Brazzaville

=== Seventh place game ===
11 December 2018; 15:00	Guinea	34–22	Algeria	Kintélé Sports Complex, Brazzaville

=== Fifth place game ===
11 December 2018; 17:00	Tunisia	23–31	Congo	Kintélé Sports Complex, Brazzaville
11 December 2018; 17:00		(13–13)		Kintélé Sports Complex, Brazzaville

=== Third place game ===
12 December 2018; 13:30	DR Congo	33–22	Cameroon	Kintélé Sports Complex, Brazzaville
12 December 2018; 13:30		(16–10)		Kintélé Sports Complex, Brazzaville

=== Final ===
12 December 2018; 16:00	Senegal	14–19	Angola	Kintélé Sports Complex, Brazzaville
12 December 2018; 16:00		(10–7)		Kintélé Sports Complex, Brazzaville

== Final standing ==
Rank	Team
1st place, gold medalist(s)	Angola
2nd place, silver medalist(s)	Senegal
3rd place, bronze medalist(s)	DR Congo
4	Cameroon
5	Congo
6	Tunisia
7	Guinea
8	Algeria
9	Ivory Coast
10	Morocco

Team qualified for the 2019 World Championship and the African Olympic Qualification Tournament
Team qualified for the African Olympic Qualification Tournament

== Awards ==
2018 African Women's Handball Championship

Angola
13th title

Most valuable player
(Angola) Albertina Kassoma

=== All-Tournament Team ===
Position	Player
GK	(Senegal) Hatadou Sako
RW	(Tunisia) Amal Hamrouni
RB	(Angola) Azenaide Carlos
CB	(Angola) Isabel Guialo
LB	(Democratic Republic of the Congo) Christianne Mwasesa
LW	(Senegal) Awa Fall-Diop
P	(Angola) Albertina Kassoma
