= Sondes Hachana =

Tunisian handball player

Personal information
- Nationality: Tunisian
- Born: 7 September 1996 (age 30) Teboulba
- Height: 1.72 m (5 ft 8 in)

Sport
- Sport: Handball
- Position: Centre back
- Current club: ASF Teboulba
National team
Years	Team	Apps	(Gls)
–	Tunisia	11	(10)
Medal record
African Championship
Bronze medal – third place	2021 Yaoundé
Bronze medal – third place	2024 Kinshasa
Mediterranean Games
Silver medal – second place	2026 Taranto	Team

Sondes Hachana (born 7 September 1996) is a Tunisian handball player for ASF Teboulba and the Tunisian national team.

She represented Tunisia at the 2013 World Women's Handball Championship in Serbia.
