= Aya Ben Abdallah =

Tunisian handball player

Personal information
- Nationality: Tunisian
- Born: 19 August 1997 (age 29) Tunis, Tunisia
- Height: 1.65 m (5 ft 5 in)

Sport
- Sport: Handball
- Position: Right wing
- Current club: Club Africain
National team
| Years | Team | Apps | (Gls) |
| – | Tunisia | 24 | (36) |
Medal record
African Championship
| Bronze medal – third place | 2024 Kinshasa |
- Updated on 27 November 2025

Aya Ben Abdallah (born 19 August 1997) is a Tunisian handball player for Club Africain and the Tunisian national team.

She participated at the 2017 and the 2025 World Women's Handball Championship.
