= African Handball Championship =

African Handball Championship may refer to:

- African Men's Handball Championship, men's tournament
- African Women's Handball Championship, women's tournament
