= Royal Moroccan Handball Federation =

Governing body of handball in Morocco

Royal Moroccan Handball Federation French: Fédération Royale Marocaine de Handball Arabic: الجامعة الملكية المغربية الكرة اليد RMHF
- IOC nation: Kingdom of Morocco (MAR)
- Sport: Handball
- Other sports: Beach handball
- Official website: www.frmhandball.com

HISTORY
- Year of formation: 1960; 66 years ago

AFFILIATIONS
- International federation: International Handball Federation (IHF)
- IHF member since: 1960
- Continental association: African Handball Confederation
- National Olympic Committee: Moroccan Olympic Committee

GOVERNING BODY
- President: Monsieur El-Hanafi El-Adli

HEADQUARTERS
- Address: 51 Avenue Ibn Sina Agdal, Boîte Postale 106 RP Rabat
- Country: Morocco
- Secretary General: Yazid Souadi

The Royal Moroccan Handball Federation (French: Fédération Royale Marocaine de Handball; Arabic: الجامعة الملكية المغربية الكرة اليد) (RMHF) is the administrative and controlling body for handball and beach handball in the Kingdom of Morocco. Founded in 1960, RMHF is a member of African Handball Confederation (CAHB) and the International Handball Federation (IHF).

== National teams ==
- Morocco men's national handball team
- Morocco men's national junior handball team
- Morocco men's national youth handball team
- Morocco women's national handball team
- Morocco women's national junior handball team
- Morocco women's national youth handball team
