= Amal Hamrouni =

Tunisian handball player

Personal information
- Nationality: Tunisian
- Born: 16 June 1995 (age 31) Tunis, Tunisia
- Height: 1.56 m (5 ft 1 in)

Sport
- Sport: Handball
- Position: Right back
- Current club: ASF Sfax
National team
Years	Team	Apps	(Gls)
–	Tunisia	45	(195)
Medal record
African Championship
Bronze medal – third place	2024 Kinshasa
- Updated on 27 November 2025

Amal Hamrouni (born 16 June 1995) is a Tunisian handball player for ASF Sfax and the Tunisian national team.

She participated at the 2015 and 2017 World Women's Handball Championship.

She is the daughter of Tunisian former footballer Ayadi Hamrouni.
