= Tunisia women's national handball team =

Tunisia

Information
- Nickname: نسور قرطاج (Eagles of Carthage)
- Association: Tunisian Handball Federation
- Coach: Pablo Morel
- Assistant coach: Ahmed Ben Mahmoud
- Most caps: Mouna Chebbah (232)
- Most goals: Mouna Chebbah (1009)

Colours
| 1st | 2nd |

Results

World Championship
- Appearances: 11 (First in 1975)
- Best result: 12th (1975)

African Championship
- Appearances: 22 (First in 1974)
- Best result: Champions (gold) (1974, 1976, 2014)
- Last updated on Unknown.

Tunisia women's national handball team
Medal record

African Championship
| Gold medal – first place | 1974 Tunisia | |
| Gold medal – first place | 1976 Algeria | |
| Gold medal – first place | 2014 Algeria | |
| Silver medal – second place | 1981 Tunisia | |
| Silver medal – second place | 2006 Tunisia | |
| Silver medal – second place | 2010 Egypt | |
| Silver medal – second place | 2012 Morocco | |
| Silver medal – second place | 2016 Angola | |
| Bronze medal – third place | 2000 Algeria | |
| Bronze medal – third place | 2002 Morocco | |
| Bronze medal – third place | 2021 Cameroon | |
| Bronze medal – third place | 2024 DR Congo | |

African Games
| Bronze medal – third place | 1978 Algiers | Team |

Mediterranean Games
| Silver medal – second place | 2026 Taranto | |

Pan Arab Games
| Gold medal – first place | 1985 Rabat | |
| Silver medal – second place | 1992 Damascus | |
| Silver medal – second place | 1999 Amman | |
| Silver medal – second place | 2011 Doha | Team |

The Tunisia women's national handball team (Arabic: منتخب تونس لكرة اليد للسيدات), nicknamed Les Aigles de Carthage (The Eagles of Carthage or The Carthage Eagles), is the national handball team of Tunisia. It is governed by the Tunisian Handball Federation and takes part in international handball competitions. They are considered one of the strongest teams in Africa, together with Angola.

== Competitive record ==
Champions Runners-up Third place Fourth place

- Red border color indicates tournament was held on home soil.

=== World Championship ===
Tunisia in the World Championship
| Year | Position | Pld | W | D | L | GF | GA | +/- |
|---|---|---|---|---|---|---|---|---|
| (Socialist Federal Republic of Yugoslavia) Yugoslavia 1957 | did not enter | | | | | | | |
| Romania 1962 | did not enter | | | | | | | |
| West Germany 1965 | did not enter | | | | | | | |
| Netherlands 1971 | did not enter | | | | | | | |
| (Socialist Federal Republic of Yugoslavia) Yugoslavia 1973 | did not enter | | | | | | | |
| Soviet Union 1975 | 12th place | | | | | | | |
| Czechoslovakia 1978 | did not qualify | | | | | | | |
| Hungary 1982 | did not qualify | | | | | | | |
| Netherlands 1986 | did not qualify | | | | | | | |
| South Korea 1990 | did not qualify | | | | | | | |
| Norway 1993 | did not qualify | | | | | | | |
| / Austria / Hungary 1995 | did not qualify | | | | | | | |
| Germany 1997 | did not qualify | | | | | | | |
| / Denmark / Norway 1999 | did not qualify | | | | | | | |
| Italy 2001 | 19th place | | | | | | | |
| Croatia 2003 | 18th place | | | | | | | |
| Russia 2005 | did not qualify | | | | | | | |
| France 2007 | 15th place | | | | | | | |
| China 2009 | 14th place | | | | | | | |
| Brazil 2011 | 18th place | | | | | | | |
| Serbia 2013 | 17th place | | | | | | | |
| Denmark 2015 | 21st place | | | | | | | |
| Germany 2017 | 24th place | | | | | | | |
| Japan 2019 | did not qualify | | | | | | | |
| Spain 2021 | 27th place | | | | | | | |
| // Denmark / Norway / Sweden 2023 | did not qualify | | | | | | | |
| / Germany / Netherlands 2025 | 20th place | | | | | | | |
| Hungary 2027 | to be determined | | | | | | | |
| Spain 2029 | to be determined | | | | | | | |
| / Czech Republic/Poland 2031 | to be determined | | | | | | | |
| Total | 11/27 | | | | | | | |

=== African Championship ===
Tunisia in the African Championship
| Year | Round | Position | Pld | W | D | L |
|---|---|---|---|---|---|---|
| Tunisia 1974 | Final | Champions | | | | |
| Algeria 1976 | Final | Champions | | | | |
| (Republic of the Congo) Congo 1979 | did not participate | | | | | |
| Tunisia 1981 | Final | Runners Up | | | | |
| Egypt 1983 | | 5th place | | | | |
| Angola 1985 | Semi-final | 4th place | | | | |
| Morocco 1987 | Semi-final | 4th place | | | | |
| Algeria 1989 | | 6th place | | | | |
| Egypt 1991 | did not qualify | | | | | |
| Ivory Coast 1992 | | 7th place | | | | |
| Tunisia 1994 | | 6th place | | | | |
| Benin 1996 | did not qualify | | | | | |
| South Africa 1998 | did not qualify | | | | | |
| Algeria 2000 | Semi-final | Third place | | | | |
| Morocco 2002 | Semi-final | Third place | | | | |
| Egypt 2004 | Semi-final | 4th place | | | | |
| Tunisia 2006 | Final | Runners Up | | | | |
| Angola 2008 | Semi-final | 4th place | | | | |
| Egypt 2010 | Final | Runners Up | | | | |
| Morocco 2012 | Final | Runners Up | | | | |
| Algeria 2014 | Final | Champions | | | | |
| Angola 2016 | Final | Runners Up | | | | |
| (Republic of the Congo) Congo 2018 | Quarter-final | 6th place | | | | |
| Cameroon 2021 | Semi-final | Third place | | | | |
| Senegal 2022 | Quarter-final | 5th place | | | | |
| (Democratic Republic of the Congo) Kinshasa 2024 | Semi-final | Third place | | | | |
| (Tunisia) Nabeul/Hammamet 2026 | Qualified | | | | | |
| Total | | 23/27 | | | | |

=== African Games ===
Tunisia in the African Games
| Games | Round | Position | Pld | W | D | L | GF | GA | GD |
|---|---|---|---|---|---|---|---|---|---|
| (Algeria) 1978 Algiers | Third Place | 3rd of 6 | | | | | | | |
| (Kenya) 1987 Nairobi | did not participate | | | | | | | | |
| (Egypt) 1991 Cairo | did not participate | | | | | | | | |
| (Zimbabwe) 1995 Harare | withdrew | | | | | | | | |
| (South Africa) 1999 Johannesburg | did not participate | | | | | | | | |
| (Nigeria) 2003 Abuja | did not participate | | | | | | | | |
| (Algeria) 2007 Algiers | Five Place | 5th of 8 | | | | | | | |
| (Mozambique) 2011 Maputo | did not participate | | | | | | | | |
| (Republic of the Congo) 2015 Brazzaville | did not participate | | | | | | | | |
| (Morocco) 2019 Rabat | Five Place | 5th of 10 | | | | | | | |
| Total | 3/10 | 0 Titles | | | | | | | |

=== Mediterranean Games ===
Tunisia in the Mediterranean Games
| Games | Round | Position | Pld | W | D | L | GF | GA | GD |
|---|---|---|---|---|---|---|---|---|---|
| (Socialist Federal Republic of Yugoslavia) 1979 Split | did not participate | | | | | | | | |
| (Morocco) 1983 Casablanca | Tournament canceled | | | | | | | | |
| (Syria) 1987 Latakia | did not participate | | | | | | | | |
| (Greece) 1991 Athens | did not participate | | | | | | | | |
| (France) 1993 Languedoc-Roussillon | did not participate | | | | | | | | |
| (Italy) 1997 Bari | did not participate | | | | | | | | |
| (Tunisia) 2001 Tunis | | 7th of 8 | | | | | | | |
| (Spain) 2005 Almería | did not participate | | | | | | | | |
| (Italy) 2009 Pescara | did not participate | | | | | | | | |
| (Turkey) 2013 Mersin | | 7th of 10 | | | | | | | |
| (Spain) 2018 Tarragona | did not participate | | | | | | | | |
| (Algeria) 2022 Oran | | 6th of 8 | | | | | | | |
| Total | 3/11 | 0 Title | | | | | | | |

=== Pan Arab Games ===
Tunisia in the Pan Arab Games
| Games | Round | Position | Pld | W | D | L | GF | GA | GD |
|---|---|---|---|---|---|---|---|---|---|
| (Morocco) 1985 Rabat | Final | Champions | | | | | | | |
| (Syria) 1992 Damascus | Final | Runners-up | | | | | | | |
| (Lebanon) 1997 Beirut | cancelled | | | | | | | | |
| (Jordan) 1999 Amman | Final | Runners-up | | | | | | | |
| (Algeria) 2004 Algiers | Tournament canceled | | | | | | | | |
| (Egypt) 2007 Cairo | cancelled | | | | | | | | |
| (Qatar) 2011 Doha | Final | Runners-up | | | | | | | |
| Total | 4/4 | 1 Title | | | | | | | |

== Other records ==
Spain international tournament

- (bronze) Third Place: 2022

== Current squad ==
Squad for the 2025 World Women's Handball Championship.

Head coach: Pablo Morel

| No. | Pos. | Name | Date of birth (age) | Height | App. | Goals | Club |
|---|---|---|---|---|---|---|---|
| 1 | GK | Roua Bouida | 12 September 2001 (age 25) | 1.70 m | 7 | 0 | (Tunisia) ASF Sahel |
| 2 | LB | Maroua Dhaouadi | 22 May 1992 (age 34) | 1.80 m | 58 | 143 | (Tunisia) Club Africain |
| 5 | RW | Aya Ben Abdallah | 19 August 1997 (age 29) | 1.68 m | 24 | 36 | (Romania) HC Zalău |
| 6 | P | Amal Ben Hassine | 23 February 2004 (age 22) | 1.76 m | 13 | 28 | (Tunisia) El Menzah Sport |
| 7 | LW | Fatma Bouri | 29 January 1993 (age 33) | 1.79 m | 30 | 32 | (Tunisia) Club Africain |
| 8 | CB | Fadwa Aouij | 23 February 2001 (age 25) | 1.71 m | 25 | 89 | (Tunisia) Club Africain |
| 10 | RB | Amal Hamrouni | 16 June 1995 (age 31) | 1.56 m | 45 | 195 | (France) La Roche-sur-Yon Vendée handball |
| 12 | GK | Roa Mkadem | 9 April 2000 (age 26) | 1.78 m | 14 | 0 | (Tunisia) Sporting Club de Moknine |
| 13 | P | Yosr Mostefaoui | 18 August 2006 (age 20) | 1.80 m | 0 | 0 | (France) Achenheim Truchtersheim Handball |
| 14 | P | Mouna Jlezi | 22 June 1991 (age 35) | 1.73 m | 37 | 63 | (Romania) HC Zalău |
| 16 | GK | Basma Sfar | 30 November 1997 (age 28) | 1.81 m | 12 | 0 | (France) Blanzat Sport Montluçon |
| 18 | CB | Salma Ben Hassine | 18 September 2005 (age 21) | 1.76 m | 12 | 59 | (Tunisia) Association Sportive Féminine de Mahdia |
| 19 | RW | Nada Zelfani | 11 November 2000 (age 25) | 1.73 m | 20 | 70 | (Tunisia) ASF Sahel |
| 20 | LW | Mariem Rezgui | 20 January 1997 (age 29) | 1.73 m | 10 | 7 | (Tunisia) Sporting Club de Moknine |
| 21 | CB | Sondes Hachana | 7 September 1996 (age 30) | 1.72 m | 38 | 97 | (Tunisia) Sporting Club de Moknine |
| 27 | RW | Houda Rmiza | 19 June 2004 (age 22) | 1.58 m | 13 | 55 | (Tunisia) Club Africain |
| 55 | LB | Mayssa Ben Hassine | 16 December 2004 (age 21) | 1.70 m | 0 | 0 | (France) Paris 92 |
| 98 | CB | Soumaya Belhadj | 30 September 1998 (age 28) | 1.71 m | 19 | 34 | (Tunisia) Sporting Club de Moknine |

== See also ==
- Tunisia men's national handball team
- Tunisia women's national junior handball team
- Tunisia women's national youth handball team
- Tunisia women's national beach handball team
