= Egypt women's national handball team =

Egypt

Information
- Nickname: The Cleopatras
- Association: Egyptian Handball Federation
- Coach: Mohamed Ahmed
- Assistant coach: Amr Youssef
- Captain: Ehsan Abdelmalek

Colours
1st	2nd

Results

World Championship
- Appearances: 1 (First in 2025)
- Best result: 28th (2025)

African Championship
- Appearances: 12 (First in 1974)
- Best result: 3rd (1974)
- Last updated on Unknown.

The Egypt women's national handball team is the national team of Egypt. It is governed by the Egyptian Handball Federation and takes part in international handball competitions. The national team wasn't active from 2012 to 2022, before the Egyptian Handball Federation decided to reestablish a team.

Following the team's fourth place at the 2024 African Women's Handball Championship, they qualified for their first ever World Handball Championship at the 2025 edition in Germany and Netherlands.

== Tournament record ==
=== World Championship ===
- 2025 – 28th

=== African Championship ===
- 1974 – 3rd
- 1981 – 6th
- 1983 – 8th
- 1985 – 7th
- 1987 – 6th
- 1989 – 5th
- 1991 – 7th
- 2004 – 6th
- 2010 – 6th
- 2012 – 9th
- 2022 – 8th
- 2024 – 4th
- 2026 – Qualified

== Current squad ==
Roster for the 2025 World Women's Handball Championship.

Head coach: Mohamed Ahmed

No.	Pos.	Name	Date of birth (age)	Height	App.	Goals	Club
1	GK	Mai Gomaa	13 August 1995 (age 31)	1.89 m	15	0	(Poland) AZS Politechnika Koszalin
4	LW	Amina Accousch	11 May 2003 (age 23)	1.72 m	33	53	(Egypt) Al Ahly
6	RW	Ons Yaakoub	9 April 2008 (age 18)	1.64 m	10	22	(Egypt) Al Zohour SC
7	RB	Rawan Abdallah	1 January 2003 (age 23)	1.76 m	19	57	(Egypt) Al Ahly
9	RB	Shrouk Elsheref	7 July 2006 (age 20)	1.74 m	45	98	(Egypt) Al Ahly
10	CB	Ehsan Abdelnaeim	27 November 1986 (age 39)	1.74 m	24	75	(France) OGC Nice Côte d'Azur Handball
11	LB	Loijin Abdalla	17 February 2004 (age 22)	1.84 m	45	62	(Egypt) Smouha SC
22	LB	Touka Gadallah	2 December 2004 (age 21)	1.77 m	40	83	(Egypt) Al Ahly
24	LB	Sondos Essam	1 January 2008 (age 18)	1.68 m	6	19	(Egypt) Giza Sports Club
25	RB	Malak Seoudy	10 January 2002 (age 24)	1.70 m	33	46	(Egypt) Alexandria Sporting Club
28	CB	Nadein Abdelrahman	18 December 2004 (age 21)	1.72 m	39	62	(Egypt) Alexandria Sporting Club
33	RW	Amina Hagag	1 October 1995 (age 31)	1.73 m	15	37	(Egypt) Al Ahly
44	P	Mariam Ibrahim	21 March 2002 (age 24)	1.84 m	18	28	(Egypt) Alexandria Sporting Club
66	RB	Yara Mahmoud	30 November 2003 (age 22)	1.69 m	27	46	(Egypt) El Shams SC
89	P	Fatma Oraby	17 May 2005 (age 21)	1.71 m	33	43	(Egypt) El Shams SC
90	LB	Shahd Saadalla	13 September 2006 (age 20)	1.90 m	22	78	(Egypt) Alexandria Sporting Club
96	GK	Ganna Ali	6 December 2006 (age 19)	1.80 m	20	0	(Egypt) Alexandria Sporting Club
98	GK	Gihad Sayed	21 February 2006 (age 20)	1.78 m	41	0	(Egypt) Al Ahly
99	LW	Nouran Abdelsalam	30 September 1996 (age 30)	1.70 m	15	22	(Egypt) Al Ahly

== See also ==
- Egypt women's national junior handball team
- Egypt women's national youth handball team
