= Gabon women's national handball team =

Gabon

Information
- Association: Fédération Gabonaise de Handball

Colours
1st	2nd

Results

African Championship
- Appearances: 7 (First in 1979)
- Best result: 7th (1987, 2002, 2006)
- Last updated on Unknown.

The Gabon women's national handball team is the national team of Gabon. It is governed by the Fédération Gabonaise de Handball and takes part in international handball competitions.

== African Championship record ==
- 1979 – 9th
- 1983 – 9th
- 1987 – 7th
- 2000 – 8th
- 2002 – 7th
- 2006 – 7th
- 2008 – 8th
