= Pasma Nchouapouognigni =

Cameroonian handball player

Personal information
- Nationality: Cameroonian
- Born: 21 December 1992 (age 33)
- Height: 1.85 m (6 ft 1 in)

Sport
- Sport: Handball
- Position: Centre back
- Current club: Rouen Handball

Senior clubs
- Years: Team
- –: DGSP
- –: Rouen Handball
National team
Years	Team	Apps	(Gls)
–	Cameroon	40	(0)
- Updated on 27 November 2023

Pasma Nchouapouognigni (born 21 December 1992) is a Cameroonian handball player for DSGP and the Cameroonian national team.

She represented Cameroon at the 2017 World Women's Handball Championship in Germany. She also represented them at the 2023 World Women's Handball Championship in Scandinavia.
