= Vanessa Moesta =

Guadeloupean handball player

Personal information
- Nationality: Guadeloupeen
- Born: 16 December 1992 (age 33)
- Height: 1.68 m (5 ft 6 in)

Sport
- Sport: Handball
- Position: Right Left
- Current club: Angoulême Charente Handball
- Number: 8
National team
- Years: Team
- –: DR Congo

Vanessa Moesta (born 16 December 1992) is a Congolese handball player for Angoulême Charente Handball and the DR Congo national team.

She represented DR Congo at the 2019 World Women's Handball Championship.
