= Ivory Coast women's national handball team =

Handball team

Ivory Coast

Information
- Association: Ivorian Handball Federation

Colours
1st	2nd

Results

Summer Olympics
- Appearances: 1 (First in 1988)
- Best result: 8th (1988)

World Championship
- Appearances: 7 (First in 1995)
- Best result: 14th (1997)

African Championship
- Appearances: 22 (First in 1976)
- Best result: 1st (1987, 1996)
- Last updated on Unknown.

The Ivory Coast women's national handball team is the national team of Ivory Coast. It is takes part in international handball competitions.

The team participated in the 2009 World Women's Handball Championship in China, finishing 18th. In 2011 they finished 16th.

== Results ==
=== Summer Olympics ===
- 1988 – 8th

=== World Championship ===
- 1995 – 17–20th
- 1997 – 14th
- 1999 – 20th
- 2003 – 21st
- 2005 – 21st
- 2009 – 18th
- 2011 – 16th

=== African Championship ===
- 1976 – 6th
- 1979 – 4th
- 1981 – 4th
- 1983 – 4th
- 1985 – 2nd
- 1987 – 1st
- 1989 – 2nd
- 1991 – 6th
- 1992 – 3rd
- 1994 – 2nd
- 1996 – 1st
- 1998 – 3rd
- 2000 – 5th
- 2002 – 2nd
- 2004 – 3rd
- 2006 – 4th
- 2008 – 2nd
- 2010 – 3rd
- 2012 – 7th
- 2016 – 5th
- 2018 – 9th
- 2022 – 7th
