= Senegal women's national handball team =

Senegal

Information
- Association: Fédération sénégalaise de handball
- Coach: Yacine Messaoudi
- Assistant coach: Rachid Missaoua

Colours
1st	2nd

Results

World Championship
- Appearances: 3 (First in 2019)
- Best result: 18th (2019, 2023)

African Championship
- Appearances: 13 (First in 1974)
- Best result: 2nd (1974, 2018, 2024)
- Last updated on Unknown.

The Senegal women's national handball team is the national team of Senegal. It is governed by the Fédération Sénégalaise de Handball and takes part in international handball competitions.

== Results ==
=== World Championship ===
- 2019 – 18th
- 2023 – 18th
- 2025 – 24th

=== African Championship ===
- 1974 – 2nd
- 1976 – 5th
- 1985 – 8th
- 1991 – 5th
- 1992 – 6th
- 2000 – 7th
- 2012 – 8th
- 2014 – 6th
- 2016 – Disqualified
- 2018 – 2nd
- 2021 – 5th
- 2022 – 4th
- 2024 – 2nd
- 2026 – Qualified

== Current squad ==
The official squad for the 2025 World Women's Handball Championship.

Head coach: Yacine Messaoudi

No.	Pos.	Name	Date of birth (age)	Height	App.	Goals	Club
10	LW	Aminata Cissokho	1 June 2001 (age 25)	1.75 m	6	14	(France) Paris 92
12	GK	Fatima Camara	7 December 2004 (age 21)	1.78 m	0	0	(France) Palente Besançon Handball
15	P	Hawa N'Diaye	24 July 1995 (age 31)	1.76 m	28	91	(Romania) SCM Gloria Buzău
16	GK	Justicia Toubissa	16 July 2001 (age 25)	1.73 m	21	0	(France) Sambre-Avesnois Handball
17	RW	Honorine Da Sylva	31 January 2006 (age 20)	1.67 m	0	0	(France) ASUL Vaulx-en-Velin Handball
21	LW	Mathita Diawara	21 January 2003 (age 23)	1.75 m	6	2	(France) OGC Nice
23	P	Maiwenn Dasylva	30 October 2002 (age 24)	1.85 m	6	2	(France) Rouen Handball
24	LB	Dounia Abdourahim	17 January 1992 (age 34)	1.82 m	0	0	(France) Le Havre AC
27	LW	Dienaba Sy	27 June 1995 (age 31)	1.69 m	17	21	(France) OGC Nice
29	LB	Gnonsiane Niombla	9 July 1990 (age 36)	1.72 m	0	0	(Romania) Viitorul Cluj-Napoca
31	P	Marie Fall	2 April 1998 (age 28)	1.85 m	6	12	(France) OGC Nice
42	LB	Astou N'Diaye	23 April 2000 (age 26)	1.68 m	6	6	(Tunisia) Club Africain
44	RW	Raïssa Dapina	27 September 1995 (age 31)	1.75 m	28	65	(France) OGC Nice
55	LB	Soda Cissé	4 March 1998 (age 28)	1.76 m	6	8	(Tunisia) AS Téboulba
77	CB	Sophie Kebe	29 July 2001 (age 25)	1.70 m	12	35	(France) Palente Besançon Handball
92	LB	Coura Camara	1 March 1999 (age 27)	1.80 m	0	0	(France) Cesson Rennes MHB
99	GK	Ndeye Sene	12 February 1997 (age 29)	1.90 m	6	0	(France) Golf Handball Club
