= Tanzania women's national handball team =

Tanzania

Information
- Association: Tanzania Amateur Handball Association

Colours
1st	2nd

Results

African Championship
- Appearances: 1 (First in 2004)
- Best result: 8th (2004)
- Last updated on Unknown.

The Tanzania women's national handball team is the national team of Tanzania. It is governed by the Tanzania Amateur Handball Association and takes part in international handball competitions.

== African Championship record ==
- 2004 – 8th
