= 2026 African Women's Handball Championship =

Tournament details
- Host country: Tunisia
- Venues: 2 (in 2 host cities)
- Dates: 2–12 December
- Teams: 16 (from 1 confederation)

The 2026 African Women's Handball Championship will be the 27th edition of the African Women's Handball Championship, held from 2 to 7 December 2026 in Nabeul and Hammamet, Tunisia. It acts as the African qualifying tournament for the 2027 World Women's Handball Championship, with the top four nations qualifying.

== Qualified teams ==
The following countries registered for the competition.

- Angola
- Tunisia (host)
- Algeria
- Benin
- Cameroon
- Cape Verde
- Congo
- DR Congo
- Egypt
- Guinea
- Mali
- Morocco
- Réunion
- Senegal
- Zambia
- Uganda

== Draw ==
The draw was held on 29 October 2026.

== Preliminary round ==
=== Group A ===
Pos	Team	Pld	W	D	L	GF	GA	GD	Pts	Qualification
1	Egypt	0	0	0	0	0	0	0	0	Quarterfinals
1	Congo	0	0	0	0	0	0	0	0	Quarterfinals
1	Cape Verde	0	0	0	0	0	0	0	0	Presidents Cup
1	Benin	0	0	0	0	0	0	0	0	Presidents Cup

First match(es) will be played: 2 December 2026. Source: IHF
Rules for classification: 1) points; 2) head-to-head points; 3) head-to-head goal difference; 4) head-to-head number of goals scored; 5) goal difference.

=== Group B ===
Pos	Team	Pld	W	D	L	GF	GA	GD	Pts	Qualification
1	Senegal	0	0	0	0	0	0	0	0	Quarterfinals
1	Algeria	0	0	0	0	0	0	0	0	Quarterfinals
1	Guinea	0	0	0	0	0	0	0	0	Presidents Cup
1	Réunion	0	0	0	0	0	0	0	0	Presidents Cup

First match(es) will be played: 2 December 2026. Source: IHF
Rules for classification: 1) points; 2) head-to-head points; 3) head-to-head goal difference; 4) head-to-head number of goals scored; 5) goal difference.

=== Group C ===
Pos	Team	Pld	W	D	L	GF	GA	GD	Pts	Qualification
1	Tunisia (H)	0	0	0	0	0	0	0	0	Quarterfinals
1	Cameroon	0	0	0	0	0	0	0	0	Quarterfinals
1	Uganda	0	0	0	0	0	0	0	0	Presidents Cup
1	Zambia	0	0	0	0	0	0	0	0	Presidents Cup

First match(es) will be played: 2 December 2026. Source: IHF
Rules for classification: 1) points; 2) head-to-head points; 3) head-to-head goal difference; 4) head-to-head number of goals scored; 5) goal difference.
(H) Hosts

=== Group D ===
Pos	Team	Pld	W	D	L	GF	GA	GD	Pts	Qualification
1	Angola	0	0	0	0	0	0	0	0	Quarterfinals
1	DR Congo	0	0	0	0	0	0	0	0	Quarterfinals
1	Morocco	0	0	0	0	0	0	0	0	Presidents Cup
1	Mali	0	0	0	0	0	0	0	0	Presidents Cup

First match(es) will be played: 2 December 2026. Source: IHF
Rules for classification: 1) points; 2) head-to-head points; 3) head-to-head goal difference; 4) head-to-head number of goals scored; 5) goal difference.

== Presidents Cup ==
=== Bracket ===
Ninth place bracket

9–12th place semifinals
December
December

Ninth place game
December
Eleventh place game
December

13th place bracket

13–16th place semifinals
December
December

13th place game
December
15th place game
December

== Knockout stage ==
=== Bracket ===
Quarter-finals
December
December
December
December

Semi-finals
December
December

Final
December
Third place
December

Fifth place bracket

5–8th place semifinals
December
December

Fifth place game
December
Seventh place game
December

== Final standing ==
Rank	Team
1st place, gold medalist(s)	
2nd place, silver medalist(s)	
3rd place, bronze medalist(s)	
4	
5	
6	
7	
8	
9	
10	
11	
12	
13	
14	
15	
16	

Team qualified for the 2027 World Championship
