= 1987 African Women's Handball Championship =

1987 African Women's Championship
Tournament details
- Host country: Morocco
- Venue: 1 (in 1 host city)
- Teams: 8 (from 1 confederation)

Final positions
- Champions: Ivory Coast (1st title)
- Runners-up: Cameroon
- Third place: Congo
- Fourth place: Tunisia

The 1987 African Women's Handball Championship was the seventh edition of the African Women's Handball Championship, held in Morocco. It acted as the African qualifying tournament for the 1988 Summer Olympics.

== Preliminary round ==
=== Group A ===
Team	Pld	W	D	L	GF	GA	GD	Pts
Congo	3	3	0	0	51	33	+18	6
Tunisia	3	2	0	1	47	44	+3	4
Egypt	3	1	0	2	35	43	−8	2
Gabon	3	0	0	3	32	45	−13	0

4 July 1987	Congo	17–9	Egypt

5 July 1987	Tunisia	15–14	Egypt

6 July 1987	Tunisia	19–10	Gabon

7 July 1987	Congo	14–11	Gabon

8 July 1987	Congo	20–13	Tunisia

8 July 1987	Egypt	12–11	Gabon

=== Group B ===
Team	Pld	W	D	L	GF	GA	GD	Pts
Cameroon	3	2	1	0	66	42	+24	5
Ivory Coast	3	2	0	1	61	51	+10	4
Angola	3	1	1	1	71	52	+19	3
Morocco	3	0	0	3	23	76	−53	0

4 July 1987	Ivory Coast	25–22	Angola

5 July 1987	Ivory Coast	21–9	Morocco

6 July 1987	Angola	29–7	Morocco

6 July 1987	Cameroon	20–15	Ivory Coast

7 July 1987	Cameroon	26–7	Morocco

8 July 1987	Cameroon	20–20	Angola

== Knockout stage ==
=== Seventh place game ===
11 July 1987	Gabon	22–12	Morocco

=== Fifth place game ===
11 July 1987	Angola	20–17	Egypt

=== Bracket ===
Semi-finals
Ivory Coast	18
Congo	17
Cameroon	18
Tunisia	15

Final
Ivory Coast	16
Cameroon	13
Third place
Congo	20
Tunisia	16

=== Semifinals ===
10 July 1987	Ivory Coast	18–17	Congo

10 July 1987	Cameroon	18–15	Tunisia

=== Third place game ===
12 July 1987	Congo	20–16	Tunisia

=== Final ===
27 July 1989	Ivory Coast	16–13	Cameroon
27 July 1989		(7–10)

== Final ranking ==
Qualified for the 1988 Summer Olympics

Rank	Team
Gold medal	Ivory Coast
Silver medal	Cameroon
Bronze medal	Congo
4	Tunisia
5	Angola
6	Egypt
7	Gabon
8	Morocco
