= Democratic Republic of the Congo Handball Federation =

Governing body of handball in the Democratic Republic of the Congo

Democratic Republic of the Congo Handball Federation French: Fédération de Handball du Congo Démocratique DRCHF
- IOC nation: Democratic Republic of the Congo (COD)
- Sport: Handball
- Other sports: Beach handball
- Official website: www.fehandcd.webnode.fr

HISTORY
- Year of formation: 1970; 55 years ago

AFFILIATIONS
- International federation: International Handball Federation (IHF)
- IHF member since: 1970
- Continental association: African Handball Confederation
- National Olympic Committee: Democratic Republic of the Congo National Olympic Committee

GOVERNING BODY
- President: Amos Mbayo Kitenge

HEADQUARTERS
- Address: 83, Avenue des tropiques, residential area, 2nd street in the Commune of Limete, Kinshasa
- Country: DR Congo (Democratic Republic of the Congo)
- Secretary General: Freddy Ntanga

The Democratic Republic of the Congo Handball Federation (French: Fédération de Handball du Congo Démocratique) (DRCHF) is the administrative and controlling body for handball and beach handball in the Democratic Republic of the Congo. Founded in 1970, DRCHF is a member of African Handball Confederation (CAHB) and the International Handball Federation (IHF).

== National teams ==
- DR Congo men's national handball team
- DR Congo men's national junior handball team
- DR Congo women's national handball team
