= Benin women's national handball team =

Benin

Information
- Association: Fédération Béninoise de Handball

Colours
1st	2nd

Results

African Championship
- Appearances: 1 (First in 1979)
- Best result: 8th (1979)
- Last updated on Unknown.

The Benin women's national handball team is the national team of Benin. It is governed by the Fédération Béninoise de Handball and takes part in international handball competitions.

== African Championship record ==
- 1979 – 8th
- 2026 – Qualified
