= 1989 African Women's Handball Championship =

1989 African Women's Championship
Tournament details
- Host country: Algeria
- Venue: 1 (in 1 host city)
- Dates: 17–27 July
- Teams: 6 (from 1 confederation)

Final positions
- Champions: Angola (1st title)
- Runners-up: Ivory Coast
- Third place: Congo
- Fourth place: Algeria

The 1989 African Women's Handball Championship was the eighth edition of the African Women's Handball Championship, held in Algeria from 17 to 27 July 1989. It acted as the African qualifying tournament for the 1990 World Women's Handball Championship.

== Preliminary round ==
=== Group A ===
19 July 1989; 15:30	Tunisia	15–22	Ivory Coast	Harcha

20 July 1989; 15:30	Angola	20–20	Ivory Coast	Harcha; Referees: Yakoubou, Simeon (NGR)
20 July 1989; 15:30	Palmira; Fábia 3	(10–11)	Desire 4	Harcha; Referees: Yakoubou, Simeon (NGR)

22 July 1989; 17:00	Angola	21–16	Tunisia	Harcha; Referees: K.Mouma, A.Hassan (EGY)
22 July 1989; 17:00	Bininha; Fábia 4	(10–6)	Benghrifa 4	Harcha; Referees: K.Mouma, A.Hassan (EGY)

=== Group B ===
19 July 1989; 17:00	Algeria	21–20	Congo	Harcha; Referees: J.Venâncio, G.Sousa (ANG)
19 July 1989; 17:00	Silmani 3		Mkada 9	Harcha; Referees: J.Venâncio, G.Sousa (ANG)

21 July 1989; 17:00	Egypt	11–19	Congo	Harcha

23 July 1989; 18:30	Algeria	21–15	Egypt	Boufarik

== Knockout stage ==
=== Bracket ===
Semi-finals
Angola	19
Algeria	9
Ivory Coast	19
Congo	16

Final
Angola	22
Ivory Coast	18
Third place
Algeria	17
Congo	19

=== Semifinals ===
25 July 1989	Angola	19–9	Algeria	Boumèrdes; Referees: Yakoubou, Simeon (NGR)
25 July 1989	Palmira 9	(11–5)	Slimani 3	Boumèrdes; Referees: Yakoubou, Simeon (NGR)

25 July 1989	Ivory Coast	19–16	Congo	Harcha
25 July 1989		(10–6)		Harcha

=== Third place game ===
27 July 1989	Congo	19–17	Algeria

=== Final ===
27 July 1989; 16:00	Angola	22–18	Ivory Coast	Harcha; Referees: El Kouch, Kezzouli (MAR)
27 July 1989; 16:00	Fábia Raposo 6	(11–6)	Ndri Paulette 6	Harcha; Referees: El Kouch, Kezzouli (MAR)

== Final ranking ==
Qualified for the 1990 World Championship qualifying tournament

Rank	Team
Gold medal	Angola
Silver medal	Ivory Coast
Bronze medal	Congo
4	Algeria
5	Egypt
6	Tunisia
