= Nigeria women's national handball team =

Nigeria

Information
- Association: Handball Federation of Nigeria

Colours
1st	2nd

Results

Summer Olympics
- Appearances: 1 (First in 1992)
- Best result: 8th (1992)

African Championship
- Appearances: 9 (First in 1979)
- Best result: 1st (1991)
- Last updated on Unknown.

The Nigeria women's national handball team is the national team of Nigeria. It takes part in international handball competitions.

The team's best result in the Summer Olympics was at the 1992 Olympics when it finished 8th.

== Results ==
=== Summer Olympics ===
- 1992 – 8th

=== African Championship ===
- 1976 – 6th
- 1979 – 6th
- 1981 – 3rd
- 1983 – 2nd
- 1985 – 4th
- 1991 – 1st
- 1992 – 4th
- 1994 – 5th
- 2021 – 8th
