= 1976 African Women's Handball Championship =

1976 African Women's Championship
Tournament details
- Host country: Algeria
- Venue: 1 (in 1 host city)
- Teams: 7 (from 1 confederation)

Final positions
- Champions: Tunisia (2nd title)
- Runners-up: Congo
- Third place: Algeria
- Fourth place: Uganda

Tournament statistics
- Matches played: 12
- Goals scored: 264 (22 per match)

The 1976 African Women's Handball Championship was the second edition of the African Women's Handball Championship, held in Algeria. It acted as the African qualifying tournament for the 1976 Summer Olympics qualifying tournament.

== Preliminary round ==
=== Group A ===
Team	Pld	W	D	L	GF	GA	GD	Pts
Tunisia	3	3	0	0	38	13	+25	6
Algeria (H)	3	2	0	1	31	25	+6	4
Nigeria	3	1	0	2	27	50	−23	2
Ivory Coast	3	0	0	3	25	33	−8	0

(H) Hosts

Tunisia	10–8	Ivory Coast

Algeria	11–6	Ivory Coast

Nigeria	12–11	Ivory Coast

Tunisia	8–1	Algeria

Tunisia	20–4	Nigeria

Algeria	19–11	Nigeria

=== Group B ===
Team	Pld	W	D	L	GF	GA	GD	Pts
Congo	2	2	0	0	42	27	+15	4
Uganda	2	1	0	1	27	30	−3	2
Senegal	2	0	0	2	17	29	−12	0

Congo	16–13	Senegal

Congo	26–14	Uganda

Uganda	13–4	Senegal

== Knockout stage ==
=== Fifth place game ===
Senegal	14–10	Nigeria	Hacène Harcha Arena, Algiers

=== Third place game ===
Algeria	10–8	Uganda	Hacène Harcha Arena, Algiers

=== Final ===
Tunisia	10–5	Congo	Hacène Harcha Arena, Algiers

== Final ranking ==
Qualified for the 1976 Summer Olympics qualifying tournament

Rank	Team
Gold medal	Tunisia
Silver medal	Congo
Bronze medal	Algeria
4	Uganda
5	Senegal
6	Nigeria
7	Ivory Coast
