= Cameroon women's national handball team =

National handball team of Cameroon

Cameroon

Information
- Association: Cameroon Handball Federation
- Coach: Jamal El Kabouss
- Assistant coach: Oumarou Mouhamed

Colours
1st	2nd

Results

World Championship
- Appearances: 4 (First in 2005)
- Best result: 20th (2017)

African Championship
- Appearances: 19 (First in 1979)
- Best result: 2nd (1979, 1987, 2004, 2021, 2022)
- Last updated on Unknown.

The Cameroon women's national handball team is the national team of Cameroon. It takes part in international handball competitions. The team first participated in an IHF World Women's Handball Championship in 2005, where they placed 22nd.

== Results ==
=== World Championship ===
- 2005 – 22nd place
- 2017 – 20th place
- 2021 – 28th place
- 2023 – 24th place

=== African Championship ===
- 1979 – 2nd place
- 1983 – 3rd place
- 1985 – 3rd place
- 1987 – 2nd place
- 1996 – 5th place
- 1998 – 4th place
- 2000 – 4th place
- 2002 – 5th place
- 2004 – 2nd place
- 2006 – 5th place
- 2008 – 7th place
- 2010 – 7th place
- 2012 – 5th place
- 2014 – 7th place
- 2016 – 3rd place
- 2018 – 4th place
- 2021 – 2nd place
- 2022 – 2nd place
- 2024 – 7th place
- 2026 – Qualified

== Current squad ==
Roster for the 2023 World Women's Handball Championship.

Head coach: Jamal El Kabouss

No.	Pos.	Name	Date of birth (age)	Height	App.	Goals	Club
1	GK	Noelle Mben	5 January 1998 (age 28)	1.76 m	56	0	(Turkey) Yenimahalle Bld. SK
2	CB	Sonia Nnomo	19 February 1998 (age 28)	1.60 m	10	5	(Cameroon) Fanz Yaoundé
3	RB	Brenda-Sherryl Attisso	25 May 1999 (age 27)	1.70 m	0		(France) Rueil AC Handball
4	CB	Genie Feudjie	27 March 1993 (age 33)	1.66 m	30	0	(Cameroon) Tonnerre Yaoundé
5	RW	Anne Essam	7 May 1995 (age 31)	1.62 m	7	7	(Cameroon) Tonnerre Yaoundé
6	RW	Yolande Touba	18 July 1993 (age 33)	1.62 m	60	0
7	LB	Laeticia Ateba	1 December 2001 (age 24)	1.76 m	38	28	(Cameroon) Fanz Yaoundé
8	LB	Sifan Kongnyuy	15 September 1990 (age 36)	1.70 m	0	0	(Cameroon) FAP Yaoundé
9	RB	Chantal Voulania	8 November 2003 (age 23)	1.66 m	0	0	(Cameroon) Fanz Yaoundé
11	P	Vicky Nyamsi	20 November 1996 (age 29)	1.80 m	0	0	(Cameroon) Fanz Yaoundé
12	LW	Issa Haoua	20 September 2002 (age 24)	1.73 m	0	0	(Cameroon) Fanz Yaoundé
15	RB	Paola Ebanga Baboga	6 April 1997 (age 29)	1.84 m	13	41	(France) HBC Celles-sur-Belle
17	LB	Vanessa Nchouapouognigni	21 December 1992 (age 33)	1.84 m	40	0	(France) Rouen Handball
22	GK	Marie Balana	24 September 1995 (age 31)	1.75 m	16	0	(Cameroon) FAP Yaoundé
