= 1985 African Women's Handball Championship =

1985 African Women's Championship
Tournament details
- Host country: Angola
- Venue: 1 (in 1 host city)
- Teams: 9 (from 1 confederation)

Final positions
- Champions: Congo (4th title)
- Runners-up: Ivory Coast
- Third place: Cameroon
- Fourth place: Nigeria

The 1985 African Women's Handball Championship was the sixth edition of the African Women's Handball Championship, held in Angola.

== Preliminary rounds ==
=== Group A ===
| Pos | Team | Pld | W | D | L | GF | GA | GD | Pts | Qualification |
|---|---|---|---|---|---|---|---|---|---|---|
| 1 | Ivory Coast | 3 | 2 | 1 | 0 | 68 | 46 | +22 | 5 | Semi finals |
| 2 | Congo | 3 | 2 | 1 | 0 | 63 | 45 | +18 | 5 | Semi finals |
| 3 | Angola | 3 | 1 | 0 | 2 | 50 | 59 | −9 | 2 | Fifth place game |
| 4 | Egypt | 3 | 0 | 0 | 3 | 31 | 62 | −31 | 0 | |

Source: Jornal de Angola
Rules for classification: 1) points; 2) head-to-head points; 3) head-to-head goal difference; 4) head-to-head number of goals scored; 5) goal difference.

| 14 September 1985 | Angola | 18–14 | Egypt | Pavilhão da Cidadela |
| 14 September 1985 | R.Serqueira 5 | (9–5) | Four players 3 | Pavilhão da Cidadela |

| 15 September 1985; 14:30 | Congo | 21–21 | Ivory Coast | Pavilhão da Cidadela |
| 15 September 1985; 14:30 | | (10–9) | | Pavilhão da Cidadela |

| 17 September 1985; 9:00 | Congo | 21–9 | Egypt | Pavilhão da Cidadela |
| 17 September 1985; 9:00 | | (12–4) | | Pavilhão da Cidadela |

| 17 September 1985; 14:00 | Angola | 17–24 | Ivory Coast | Pavilhão da Cidadela |
| 17 September 1985; 14:00 | | (10–12) | | Pavilhão da Cidadela |

| 19 September 1985; 9:00 | Ivory Coast | 23–8 | Egypt | Pavilhão da Cidadela |
| 19 September 1985; 9:00 | | (12–6) | | Pavilhão da Cidadela |

| 19 September 1985; 14:00 | Angola | 15–21 | Congo | Pavilhão da Cidadela |
| 19 September 1985; 14:00 | Chinha 4 | (7–9) | Constantine 5 | Pavilhão da Cidadela |

=== Group B ===
| Pos | Team | Pld | W | D | L | GF | GA | GD | Pts | Qualification |
|---|---|---|---|---|---|---|---|---|---|---|
| 1 | Nigeria | 4 | 3 | 0 | 1 | 103 | 52 | +51 | 6 | Semi finals |
| 2 | Cameroon | 4 | 3 | 0 | 1 | 103 | 57 | +46 | 6 | Semi finals |
| 3 | Tunisia | 4 | 3 | 0 | 1 | 95 | 60 | +35 | 6 | Fifth place game |
| 4 | Senegal | 4 | 1 | 0 | 3 | 54 | 94 | −40 | 2 | |
| 5 | Ghana | 4 | 0 | 0 | 4 | 33 | 125 | −92 | 0 | |

Source: Jornal de Angola
Rules for classification: 1) points; 2) head-to-head points; 3) head-to-head goal difference; 4) head-to-head number of goals scored; 5) goal difference.

| 15 September 1985; 9:00 | Ghana | 11–16 | Senegal | Pavilhão da Cidadela |
| 15 September 1985; 9:00 | | (3–6) | | Pavilhão da Cidadela |

| 15 September 1985; 14:30 | Nigeria | 19–16 | Cameroon | Pavilhão da Cidadela |
| 15 September 1985; 14:30 | | (7–9) | | Pavilhão da Cidadela |

| 16 September 1985; 09:00 | Tunisia | 20–16 | Nigeria | Pavilhão da Cidadela |
| 16 September 1985; 09:00 | | (9–6) | | Pavilhão da Cidadela |

| 16 September 1985; 09:00 | Senegal | 14–27 | Cameroon | Pavilhão da Cidadela |
| 16 September 1985; 09:00 | | (6–13) | | Pavilhão da Cidadela |

| 17 September 1985; 9:00 | Nigeria | 26–9 | Senegal | Pavilhão da Cidadela |
| 17 September 1985; 9:00 | | (12–6) | | Pavilhão da Cidadela |

| 17 September 1985; 9:00 | Tunisia | 28–8 | Ghana | Pavilhão da Cidadela |
| 17 September 1985; 9:00 | | (17–5) | | Pavilhão da Cidadela |

| 18 September 1985; 9:00 | Ghana | 7–42 | Nigeria | Pavilhão da Cidadela |
| 18 September 1985; 9:00 | | (4–23) | | Pavilhão da Cidadela |

| 18 September 1985; 15:00 | Tunisia | 17–21 | Cameroon | Pavilhão da Cidadela |
| 18 September 1985; 15:00 | | (8–10) | | Pavilhão da Cidadela |

| 19 September 1985; 9:00 | Tunisia | 30–15 | Senegal | Pavilhão da Cidadela |
| 19 September 1985; 9:00 | | (11–9) | | Pavilhão da Cidadela |

| 19 September 1985; 9:00 | Ghana | 7–39 | Cameroon | Pavilhão da Cidadela |

== Final round ==
All times are local (UTC+1).

=== Consolation matches ===
| 21 September 1985; 9:00 | Egypt | 30–15 | Senegal | Pavilhão da Cidadela |

| 21 September 1985; 11:30 | Angola | 16–13 | Tunisia | Pavilhão da Cidadela |
| 21 September 1985; 11:30 | | (10–8) | | Pavilhão da Cidadela |

| 22 September 1985; 9:00 | Tunisia | 20–20 | Egypt | Pavilhão da Cidadela |

| 22 September 1985; 10:15 | Angola | 30–12 | Ghana | Pavilhão da Cidadela |

| 23 September 1985; 9:00 | Angola | 22–10 | Senegal | Pavilhão da Cidadela |

| 23 September 1985; 10:15 | Egypt | 20–18 | Ghana | Pavilhão da Cidadela |

=== Bracket ===
Semi-finals
Congo | 24
Nigeria | 18
Ivory Coast | 22
Cameroon | 16

Final
Congo | 22
Ivory Coast | 18
Third place
Nigeria | 14
Cameroon | 24

=== Semifinals ===
| 21 September 1985; 15:45 | Ivory Coast | 22–16 | Cameroon | Pavilhão da Cidadela |

| 21 September 1985; 18:15 | Congo | 24–18 | Nigeria | Pavilhão da Cidadela |

=== 3rd place ===
| 22 September 1985; 15:00 | Cameroon | 24–14 | Nigeria | Pavilhão da Cidadela |
| 22 September 1985; 15:00 | | (10–7) | | Pavilhão da Cidadela |

=== Final ===
| 23 September 1985; 17:00 | Congo | 22–18 | Ivory Coast | Pavilhão da Cidadela |

== Final ranking ==
| Rank | Team |
|---|---|
| Gold medal | Congo |
| Silver medal | Ivory Coast |
| Bronze medal | Cameroon |
| 4 | Nigeria |
| 5 | Angola |
| 6 | Tunisia |
| 7 | Egypt |
| 8 | Senegal |
| 9 | Ghana |
