= 1981 African Women's Handball Championship =

1981 African Women's Championship
Tournament details
- Host country: Tunisia
- Venue: 1 (in 1 host city)
- Dates: 17–31 July
- Teams: 7 (from 1 confederation)

Final positions
- Champions: Congo (2nd title)
- Runners-up: Tunisia
- Third place: Nigeria
- Fourth place: Ivory Coast

The 1981 African Women's Handball Championship was the fourth edition of the African Women's Handball Championship, held in Tunisia from 17 to 31 July 1981. It acted as the African qualifying tournament for the 1982 World Women's Handball Championship.

== Draw ==
Group A	Group B
Congo; Egypt; Ivory Coast	Algeria; Angola; Nigeria; Tunisia

== Preliminary round ==
=== Group A ===
Pos	Team	Pld	W	D	L	GF	GA	GD	Pts	Qualification
1	Congo	1	1	0	0	0	0	0	2	Semifinals
2	Ivory Coast	1	1	0	0	0	0	0	2	Semifinals
3	Egypt	2	0	0	2	0	0	0	0	

Source: Todor66
Rules for classification: 1) points; 2) head-to-head points; 3) head-to-head goal difference; 4) head-to-head number of goals scored; 5) goal difference.

19 July 1981	Ivory Coast	12–9	Egypt
19 July 1981		(7–6)

25 July 1981	Congo	12–10	Egypt

28 July 1981	Congo	–	Ivory Coast

=== Group B ===
Pos	Team	Pld	W	D	L	GF	GA	GD	Pts	Qualification
1	Tunisia (H)	3	2	1	0	45	31	+14	5	Semifinals
2	Nigeria	3	1	2	0	49	33	+16	4	Semifinals
3	Algeria	3	1	1	1	39	39	0	3	
4	Angola	3	0	0	3	36	66	−30	0	

Source: Todor66
Rules for classification: 1) points; 2) head-to-head points; 3) head-to-head goal difference; 4) head-to-head number of goals scored; 5) goal difference.
(H) Hosts

17 July 1981	Tunisia	17–10	Angola
17 July 1981		(9–6)

18 July 1981	Algeria	9–9	Nigeria
18 July 1981		(–)

21 July 1981	Algeria	20–13	Angola
21 July 1981		(–)

21 July 1981	Tunisia	11–11	Nigeria
21 July 1981		(4–4)

24 July 1981	Tunisia	17–10	Algeria
24 July 1981		(–)

25 July 1981	Nigeria	29–13	Angola
25 July 1981		(–)

== Knockout stage ==
=== Bracket ===
Semi-finals
Congo
Nigeria
Tunisia
Ivory Coast

Final
Congo	11
Tunisia	10
Third place
Nigeria	12
Ivory Coast	9

Fifth place bracket

Semi-finals
Egypt
Angola

Final
Egypt	16
Algeria	17

=== Fifth place game ===
Algeria	17–16	Egypt
	(–)

=== Third place game ===
25 July 1981	Nigeria	12–9	Ivory Coast
25 July 1981		(5–3)

=== Final ===
30 July 1981	Congo	11–10	Tunisia

== Final ranking ==
Qualified for the 1982 World Championship

Rank	Team
Gold medal	Congo
Silver medal	Tunisia
Bronze medal	Nigeria
4	Ivory Coast
5	Algeria
6	Egypt
7	Angola
