= 1994 African Women's Handball Championship =

1994 African Women's Championship
Tournament details
- Host country: Tunisia
- Venue: 1 (in 1 host city)
- Dates: 5–17 November
- Teams: 6 (from 1 confederation)

Final positions
- Champions: Angola (3rd title)
- Runners-up: Ivory Coast
- Third place: Algeria
- Fourth place: Congo

The 1994 African Women's Handball Championship was the eleventh edition of the African Women's Handball Championship, held in Tunisia from 5 to 17 November 1994. It acted as the African qualifying tournament for the 1995 World Women's Handball Championship.

== Preliminary round ==
=== Group A ===
Team	Pld	W	D	L	GF	GA	GD	Pts
Congo	2	2	0	0	52	36	+16	4
Ivory Coast	2	0	1	1	30	37	−7	1
Tunisia	2	0	1	1	30	39	−9	1

9 November 1994	Congo	27–18	Tunisia

11 November 1994	Ivory Coast	12–12	Tunisia

13 November 1994	Congo	25–18	Ivory Coast

=== Group B ===
Team	Pld	W	D	L	GF	GA	GD	Pts
Algeria	2	2	0	0	35	30	+5	4
Angola	2	1	0	1	41	39	+2	2
Nigeria	2	0	0	2	32	39	−7	0

9 November 1994	Algeria	19–18	Angola
9 November 1994		(8–8)

11 November 1994	Algeria	16–12	Nigeria
11 November 1994		(8–5)

13 November 1994	Angola	23–20	Nigeria
13 November 1994		(–)

== Knockout stage ==
=== Semi-finals ===
15 November 1994	Angola	21–20	Congo
15 November 1994		(12–9)

15 November 1994	Ivory Coast	–	Algeria

=== Bracket ===
Semi-finals
Angola	21
Congo	20
Ivory Coast
Algeria

Final
Angola	24
Ivory Coast	18
Third place
Algeria	20
Congo	13

=== Third place game ===
17 November 1994	Algeria	20–13	Congo

=== Final ===
17 November 1994	Angola	24–18	Ivory Coast
17 November 1994		(17–13)

== Final ranking ==
Qualified for the 1995 World Championship qualifying tournament

Rank	Team
Gold medal	Angola
Silver medal	Ivory Coast
Bronze medal	Algeria
4	Congo
5	Nigeria
6	Tunisia
