= Réunion women's national handball team =

Réunion

Information
- Association: Ligue Réunionnaise de Handball

Colours
1st	2nd
- Last updated on Unknown.

The Réunion women's national handball team is the national team of Réunion. It is governed by the Ligue Réunionnaise de Handball and takes part in international handball competitions.

== African Championship record ==
- 2026 – Qualified
