= 2002 African Women's Handball Championship =

2002 African Women's Championship
Tournament details
- Host country: Morocco
- Venue: 1 (in 1 host city)
- Dates: 19–28 April
- Teams: 9 (from 1 confederation)

Final positions
- Champions: Angola (6th title)
- Runners-up: Ivory Coast
- Third place: Tunisia
- Fourth place: Algeria

The 2002 African Women's Handball Championship was the 15th edition of the African Women's Handball Championship, held in Morocco from 19 to 28 April 2002. It acted as the African qualifying tournament for the 2003 World Women's Handball Championship.

== Preliminary round ==
=== Group A ===
Team	Pld	W	D	L	GF	GA	GD	Pts
Tunisia	2	2	0	0	65	32	+33	4
Cameroon	2	1	0	1	45	38	+7	2
Morocco (H)	2	0	0	2	22	62	−40	0

(H) Hosts

19 April 2002	Tunisia	38–11	Morocco
19 April 2002		(15–4)

20 April 2002	Cameroon	24–11	Morocco
20 April 2002		(6–2)

21 April 2002	Tunisia	27–21	Cameroon
21 April 2002		(15–12)

=== Group B ===
Team	Pld	W	D	L	GF	GA	GD	Pts
Angola	2	2	0	0	62	32	+30	4
Ivory Coast	2	1	0	1	48	38	+10	2
Gabon	2	0	0	2	28	68	−40	0

19 April 2002	Angola	36–16	Gabon
19 April 2002		(17–7)

20 April 2002	Ivory Coast	32–12	Gabon
20 April 2002		(14–4)

21 April 2002	Angola	26–16	Ivory Coast
21 April 2002		(13–7)

=== Group C ===
Team	Pld	W	D	L	GF	GA	GD	Pts
Algeria	2	2	0	0	62	43	+19	4
Congo	2	1	0	1	64	48	+16	2
DR Congo	2	0	0	2	35	70	−35	0

19 April 2002	Congo	41–15	DR Congo
19 April 2002		(19–8)

20 April 2002	Algeria	29–20	DR Congo
20 April 2002		(12–11)

21 April 2002	Algeria	33–23	Congo
21 April 2002		(15–11)

== Second round ==
=== Group D ===
Team	Pld	W	D	L	GF	GA	GD	Pts
Angola	2	2	0	0	58	41	+17	4
Tunisia	1	0	0	1	21	27	−6	0
Congo	1	0	0	1	20	31	−11	0

23 April 2002	Angola	27–21	Tunisia
23 April 2002		(14–7)

24 April 2002	Angola	31–20	Congo
24 April 2002		(18–5)

25 April 2002	Tunisia	v	Congo

=== Group E ===
Team	Pld	W	D	L	GF	GA	GD	Pts
Ivory Coast	2	2	0	0	46	41	+5	4
Algeria	1	0	0	1	19	20	−1	0
Cameroon	1	0	0	1	22	26	−4	0

23 April 2002	Ivory Coast	26–22	Cameroon
23 April 2002		(12–9)

24 April 2002	Ivory Coast	20–19	Algeria
24 April 2002		(12–12)

25 April 2002	Algeria	v	Cameroon

== 7–9 placement group ==
Team	Pld	W	D	L	GF	GA	GD	Pts
Gabon	2	2	0	0	40	29	+11	4
DR Congo	1	0	0	1	16	18	−2	0
Morocco (H)	1	0	0	1	13	22	−9	0

(H) Hosts

23 April 2002	Gabon	22–13	Morocco
23 April 2002		(10–5)

24 April 2002	Gabon	18–16	DR Congo
24 April 2002		(5–6)

25 April 2002	DR Congo	v	Morocco

== Knockout stage ==
=== Bracket ===
Semifinals
Angola	33
Algeria	21
Tunisia	20
Ivory Coast	24

Final
Angola	30
Ivory Coast	21
Third place
Algeria	20
Tunisia	31

=== Semifinals ===
26 April 2002	Angola	33–21	Algeria
26 April 2002		(17–9)

26 April 2002	Ivory Coast	24–20	Tunisia
26 April 2002		(13–12)

=== Fifth place game ===
26 April 2002	Cameroon	29–23	Congo
26 April 2002		(9–8)

=== Third place game ===
27 April 2002	Tunisia	31–20	Algeria
27 April 2002		(19–13)

=== Final ===
28 April 2002	Angola	30–21	Ivory Coast
28 April 2002		(13–7)

== Final ranking ==
Qualified for the 2003 World Championship and the 2004 Summer Olympics qualifying tournament
Qualified for the 2004 Summer Olympics qualifying tournament

Rank	Team
Gold medal	Angola
Silver medal	Ivory Coast
Bronze medal	Tunisia
4	Algeria
5	Cameroon
6	Congo
7	Gabon
8	DR Congo
9	Morocco
