= 1974 African Women's Handball Championship =

International handball competition

1974 African Women's Championship
Tournament details
- Host country: Tunisia
- Venue: 1 (in 1 host city)
- Teams: 4 (from 1 confederation)

Final positions
- Champions: Tunisia (1st title)
- Runners-up: Senegal
- Third place: Egypt
- Fourth place: Uganda

Tournament statistics
- Matches played: 6
- Goals scored: 104 (17.33 per match)

The 1974 African Women's Handball Championship was the first edition of the African Women's Handball Championship, held in Tunisia. It acted as the African qualifying tournament for the 1975 World Women's Handball Championship.

== History ==
The Egyptian team was scheduled to play the final match against Tunisia, but Egypt withdrew because the Egyptian men's team was subjected to arbitrary injustice in the final match against Tunisia and the Tunisian public threatened them with death.

The Egyptian men's and women's teams withdrew and the African Union imposed a penalty on them by canceling all their results in the tournament As mentioned on the Egyptian website Tatweeg News.

== Standings ==
Team	Pld	W	D	L	GF	GA	GD	Pts
Tunisia (H)	3	3	0	0	36	13	+23	6
Senegal	3	1	1	1	34	27	+7	3
Uganda	3	0	0	3	16	48	−32	0
Egypt (W)	0	0	0	0	0	0	0	0

(H) Hosts; (W) Withdraw

== Results ==
Tunisia	13–9	Senegal

Tunisia	walkover	Egypt

Tunisia	23–4	Uganda

Senegal	9–9	Egypt

Senegal	16–5	Uganda

Egypt	9–7	Uganda

== Roster ==
=== Egypt ===
==== Player ====
Nadia sherif Club: Alahly Sc

Nadia Elzomr Club: Alahly Sc

Afaf Moafy Club: Alahly Sc

Amina Mahmoud Club: Alahly Sc

Mona Amin Club: Alahly Sc

Ghada Foad Club: Alahly Sc

Nahed Ismail Club: Alahly Sc

Nabila Gaber Club: Alahly Sc

Zakia Mehrez Club: Elgezira

Tahani Khorshed Club: Elgezira

Nahed Sharf Club: Elgezira

Nadia Karim Club: Elgezira

Salwa Abo Elnaga Club: Elgezira

Khairia Club: Heliopiles

Tatania Vladimir Club: Heliopiles

== Final ranking ==
Qualified for the 1975 World Championship

Rank	Team
Gold medal	Tunisia
Silver medal	Senegal
Bronze medal	Egypt
4	Uganda
