= 1983 African Women's Handball Championship =

1983 African Women's Championship
Tournament details
- Host country: Egypt
- Venue: 1 (in 1 host city)
- Dates: 23–31 July
- Teams: 9 (from 1 confederation)

Final positions
- Champions: Congo (3rd title)
- Runners-up: Nigeria
- Third place: Cameroon
- Fourth place: Ivory Coast

The 1983 African Women's Handball Championship was the fifth edition of the African Women's Handball Championship, held from 23 to 30 July 1983 at the Cairo International Stadium and the Police Arena in Cairo, Egypt.

== Draw ==
Group A	Group B
Angola; Congo; Egypt; Ivory Coast	Algeria; Cameroon; Gabon; Nigeria; Tunisia

== Preliminary round ==
=== Group A ===
Team	Pld	W	D	L	GF	GA	GDIF	Pts
Ivory Coast	3	3	0	0	64	47	+17	6
Congo	3	2	0	1	66	47	+19	4
Angola	3	1	0	2	45	60	-15	2
Egypt	3	0	0	3	48	69	-21	0

* Note: Advance to semi-finals

23 July 1983	Congo	22–12	Angola

24 July 1983	Ivory Coast	19–13	Angola

26 July 1983	Ivory Coast	23–16	Egypt

27 July 1983	Congo	26–13	Egypt

28 July 1983	Ivory Coast	22–18	Congo

28 July 1983	Angola	20–19	Egypt

=== Group B ===
Team	Pld	W	D	L	GF	GA	GDIF	Pts
Cameroon	4	3	1	0	0	0	0	7
Nigeria	4	3	1	0	0	0	0	7
Tunisia	4	2	0	2	0	0	0	4
Algeria	4	1	0	3	0	0	0	2
Gabon	4	0	0	4	0	0	0	0

* Note: Advance to semi-finals

23 July 1983	Algeria	v	Gabon

23 July 1983	Cameroon	20–19	Tunisia

24 July 1983	Tunisia	v	Gabon

24 July 1983	Cameroon	18–18	Nigeria

26 July 1983	Nigeria	16–11	Algeria
26 July 1983		(8–6)

26 July 1983	Cameroon	26–8	Gabon
26 July 1983		(10–5)

27 July 1983	Nigeria	18–11	Gabon
27 July 1983		(10–5)

27 July 1983	Tunisia	18–13	Algeria
27 July 1983		(8–9)

28 July 1983	Cameroon	23–16	Algeria
28 July 1983		(9–8)

28 July 1983	Nigeria	17–14	Tunisia
28 July 1983		(7–7)

== Knockout stage ==
=== Bracket ===
Semi-finals
Congo
Cameroon
Nigeria
Ivory Coast

Final
Congo	27
Nigeria	14
Third place
Cameroon	25
Ivory Coast	13

=== Third place game ===
31 July 1983	Cameroon	27–14	Ivory Coast

=== Final ===
31 July 1983	Congo	25–13	Nigeria

== Final ranking ==
Rank	Team
Gold medal	Congo
Silver medal	Nigeria
Bronze medal	Cameroon
4	Ivory Coast
5	Tunisia
6	Angola
7	Algeria
8	Egypt
9	Gabon
