= Handball at the 2026 Mediterranean Games – Women's tournament =

Women's handball at the 2026 Mediterranean Games
Tournament details
- Host country: Italy
- Venues: 2 (in 2 host cities)
- Dates: 22 August – 1 September
- Teams: 6 (from 2 confederations)

Final positions
- Champions: Italy (2nd title)
- Runners-up: Tunisia
- Third place: Greece
- Fourth place: Algeria

The women's handball tournament at the 2026 Mediterranean Games will be held from 22 August to 1 September 2026 in Fasano and Conversano.

== Preliminary round ==
All times are local (UTC+2).

Pos	Team	Pld	W	D	L	GF	GA	GD	Pts	Qualification
1	Tunisia	5	5	0	0	173	92	+81	10	Gold medal game
2	Italy (H)	5	4	0	1	163	121	+42	8	Gold medal game
3	Greece	5	3	0	2	157	138	+19	6	Bronze medal game
4	Algeria	5	2	0	3	144	141	+3	4	Bronze medal game
5	North Macedonia	5	1	0	4	103	172	−69	2	Fifth place game
6	Kosovo	5	0	0	5	93	178	−85	0	Fifth place game

Updated to match(es) played on 26 August 2026. Source: Groups
Rules for classification: 1) Points; 2) Head-to-head points; 3) Head-to-head goal difference; 4) Head-to-head goals scored; 5) Goal difference; 6) Goals scored; 7) Draw.
(H) Hosts

22 August 2026; 15:00	North Macedonia	26–31	Greece	Palazzetto dello Sport, Fasano; Referees: Pietro Monitillo / Francesco Simone (ITA)
22 August 2026; 15:00	Milenkoska 10	(14–10)	Mentesidou, Koukmisi 5	Palazzetto dello Sport, Fasano; Referees: Pietro Monitillo / Francesco Simone (ITA)
22 August 2026; 15:00	2× (yellow card) 4× (suspension)	Report	6× (suspension) 1× (red card)	Palazzetto dello Sport, Fasano; Referees: Pietro Monitillo / Francesco Simone (ITA)

22 August 2026; 17:30	Kosovo	20–35	Algeria	Palazzetto dello Sport, Fasano; Referees: Othmen Azzabi / Aymen Ben Abdellatif (TUN)
22 August 2026; 17:30	Krasniqi 7	(15–13)	Chebli 7	Palazzetto dello Sport, Fasano; Referees: Othmen Azzabi / Aymen Ben Abdellatif (TUN)
22 August 2026; 17:30	1× (yellow card) 6× (suspension)	Report	1× (yellow card) 6× (suspension) 1× (red card)	Palazzetto dello Sport, Fasano; Referees: Othmen Azzabi / Aymen Ben Abdellatif (TUN)

22 August 2026; 20:00	Italy	22–25	Tunisia	Pala San Giacomo, Conversano; Referees: Mustapha Deche / Mohamed Ghouarda (ALG)
22 August 2026; 20:00	Babbo 8	(11–15)	Aouij 9	Pala San Giacomo, Conversano; Referees: Mustapha Deche / Mohamed Ghouarda (ALG)
22 August 2026; 20:00	2× (yellow card) 4× (suspension)	Report	6× (suspension)	Pala San Giacomo, Conversano; Referees: Mustapha Deche / Mohamed Ghouarda (ALG)

24 August 2026; 15:00	Greece	40–20	Kosovo	Palazzetto dello Sport, Fasano; Referees: Mustapha Deche / Mohamed Ghouarda (ALG)
24 August 2026; 15:00	Andritsou 9	(19–6)	Shala 5	Palazzetto dello Sport, Fasano; Referees: Mustapha Deche / Mohamed Ghouarda (ALG)
24 August 2026; 15:00	1× (yellow card) 5× (suspension) 1× (red card)	Report	4× (suspension) 1× (red card)	Palazzetto dello Sport, Fasano; Referees: Mustapha Deche / Mohamed Ghouarda (ALG)

24 August 2026; 17:30	Tunisia	43–11	North Macedonia	Palazzetto dello Sport, Fasano; Referees: Maryna Duplii / Olena Karpushchenko (UKR)
24 August 2026; 17:30	Nasr 10	(20–4)	four players 2	Palazzetto dello Sport, Fasano; Referees: Maryna Duplii / Olena Karpushchenko (UKR)
24 August 2026; 17:30	8× (suspension)	Report	6× (suspension)	Palazzetto dello Sport, Fasano; Referees: Maryna Duplii / Olena Karpushchenko (UKR)

24 August 2026; 20:00	Algeria	27–37	Italy	Palazzetto dello Sport, Fasano; Referees: Mathilde Cournil / Loriane Lamour (FRA)
24 August 2026; 20:00	Mokrani 7	(9–13)	Babbo 8	Palazzetto dello Sport, Fasano; Referees: Mathilde Cournil / Loriane Lamour (FRA)
24 August 2026; 20:00	1× (yellow card) 6× (suspension)	Report	3× (suspension)	Palazzetto dello Sport, Fasano; Referees: Mathilde Cournil / Loriane Lamour (FRA)

26 August 2026; 15:00	North Macedonia	23–37	Algeria	Palazzetto dello Sport, Fasano; Referees: Othmen Azzabi / Aymen Ben Abdellatif (TUN)
26 August 2026; 15:00	Milenkoska 6	(11–20)	Boulazreg 10	Palazzetto dello Sport, Fasano; Referees: Othmen Azzabi / Aymen Ben Abdellatif (TUN)
26 August 2026; 15:00	5× (suspension)	Report	4× (suspension)	Palazzetto dello Sport, Fasano; Referees: Othmen Azzabi / Aymen Ben Abdellatif (TUN)

26 August 2026; 17:30	Greece	28–41	Tunisia	Palazzetto dello Sport, Fasano; Referees: Mathilde Cournil / Loriane Lamour (FRA)
26 August 2026; 17:30	Andritsou 10	(9–21)	Aouij 8	Palazzetto dello Sport, Fasano; Referees: Mathilde Cournil / Loriane Lamour (FRA)
26 August 2026; 17:30	1× (yellow card) 3× (suspension)	Report	6× (suspension)	Palazzetto dello Sport, Fasano; Referees: Mathilde Cournil / Loriane Lamour (FRA)

26 August 2026; 20:00	Kosovo	21–38	Italy	Palazzetto dello Sport, Fasano; Referees: Maryna Duplii / Olena Karpushchenko (UKR)
26 August 2026; 20:00	Kastrati 6	(7–17)	Babbo 13	Palazzetto dello Sport, Fasano; Referees: Maryna Duplii / Olena Karpushchenko (UKR)
26 August 2026; 20:00	1× (yellow card) 10× (suspension) 1× (red card)	Report	5× (suspension)	Palazzetto dello Sport, Fasano; Referees: Maryna Duplii / Olena Karpushchenko (UKR)

28 August 2026; 15:00	Kosovo	10–37	Tunisia	Palazzetto dello Sport, Fasano; Referees: Mustapha Deche / Mohamed Ghouarda (ALG)
28 August 2026; 15:00	Krasniqi 4	(3–20)	Aouij 8	Palazzetto dello Sport, Fasano; Referees: Mustapha Deche / Mohamed Ghouarda (ALG)
28 August 2026; 15:00	1× (yellow card) 3× (suspension)	Report		Palazzetto dello Sport, Fasano; Referees: Mustapha Deche / Mohamed Ghouarda (ALG)

28 August 2026; 17:30	Algeria	24–35	Greece	Palazzetto dello Sport, Fasano; Referees: Pietro Monitillo / Francesco Simone (ITA)
28 August 2026; 17:30	Miloudi 7	(9–16)	Mania 6	Palazzetto dello Sport, Fasano; Referees: Pietro Monitillo / Francesco Simone (ITA)
28 August 2026; 17:30	1× (yellow card) 3× (suspension)	Report	5× (suspension)	Palazzetto dello Sport, Fasano; Referees: Pietro Monitillo / Francesco Simone (ITA)

28 August 2026; 20:00	Italy	39–16	North Macedonia	Palazzetto dello Sport, Fasano; Referees: Othmen Azzabi / Aymen Ben Abdellatif (TUN)
28 August 2026; 20:00	Babbo 7	(19–7)	Todorovska 5	Palazzetto dello Sport, Fasano; Referees: Othmen Azzabi / Aymen Ben Abdellatif (TUN)
28 August 2026; 20:00	1× (suspension)	Report	5× (suspension)	Palazzetto dello Sport, Fasano; Referees: Othmen Azzabi / Aymen Ben Abdellatif (TUN)

30 August 2026; 15:00	Tunisia	26–21	Algeria	Palazzetto dello Sport, Fasano; Referees: Maryna Duplii / Olena Karpushchenko (UKR)
30 August 2026; 15:00	Belhadj 6	(12–13)	Boulazreg, Guendouz 4	Palazzetto dello Sport, Fasano; Referees: Maryna Duplii / Olena Karpushchenko (UKR)
30 August 2026; 15:00	7× (suspension) 1× (red card)	Report	1× (yellow card) 1× (red card)	Palazzetto dello Sport, Fasano; Referees: Maryna Duplii / Olena Karpushchenko (UKR)

30 August 2026; 17:30	North Macedonia	27–22	Kosovo	Palazzetto dello Sport, Fasano
30 August 2026; 17:30	Milenkoska 7	(15–10)	Kastrati, Kongjeli 4	Palazzetto dello Sport, Fasano
30 August 2026; 17:30	4× (suspension)	Report	1× (yellow card) 2× (suspension) 1× (red card)	Palazzetto dello Sport, Fasano

30 August 2026; 20:00	Italy	27–24	Greece	Palazzetto dello Sport, Fasano; Referees: Mathilde Cournil / Loriane Lamour (FRA)
30 August 2026; 20:00	Babbo 9	(17–12)	Andritsou 7	Palazzetto dello Sport, Fasano; Referees: Mathilde Cournil / Loriane Lamour (FRA)
30 August 2026; 20:00	1× (yellow card) 4× (suspension)	Report	1× (yellow card) 6× (suspension)	Palazzetto dello Sport, Fasano; Referees: Mathilde Cournil / Loriane Lamour (FRA)

== Final round ==
=== Fifth place game ===
1 September 2026; 15:00	North Macedonia	17–22	Kosovo	Palazzetto dello Sport, Fasano; Referees: Mustapha Deche / Mohamed Ghouarda (ALG)
1 September 2026; 15:00	Lashloska 5	(5–7)	Dushica 5	Palazzetto dello Sport, Fasano; Referees: Mustapha Deche / Mohamed Ghouarda (ALG)
1 September 2026; 15:00	3× (suspension)	Report	6× (suspension)	Palazzetto dello Sport, Fasano; Referees: Mustapha Deche / Mohamed Ghouarda (ALG)

=== Bronze medal game ===
1 September 2026; 17:30	Greece	29–25	Algeria	Palazzetto dello Sport, Fasano; Referees: Othmen Azzabi / Aymen Ben Abdellatif (TUN)
1 September 2026; 17:30	Chebli	(13–13)	Chebli 6	Palazzetto dello Sport, Fasano; Referees: Othmen Azzabi / Aymen Ben Abdellatif (TUN)
1 September 2026; 17:30	1× (yellow card) 6× (suspension)	Report	1× (yellow card) 5× (suspension)	Palazzetto dello Sport, Fasano; Referees: Othmen Azzabi / Aymen Ben Abdellatif (TUN)

=== Gold medal game ===
1 September 2026; 20:00	Tunisia	23–25	Italy	Palazzetto dello Sport, Fasano; Referees: Mathilde Cournil / Loriane Lamour (FRA)
1 September 2026; 20:00	Aouij, Hachana 6	(12–12)	Babbo 6	Palazzetto dello Sport, Fasano; Referees: Mathilde Cournil / Loriane Lamour (FRA)
1 September 2026; 20:00	1× (yellow card) 1× (suspension)	Report	1× (yellow card) 1× (suspension)	Palazzetto dello Sport, Fasano; Referees: Mathilde Cournil / Loriane Lamour (FRA)

== Final standings ==
Rank	Team
1st place, gold medalist(s)	Italy
2nd place, silver medalist(s)	Tunisia
3rd place, bronze medalist(s)	Greece
4	Algeria
5	Kosovo
6	North Macedonia
