= Ghana women's national handball team =

Ghana

Information
- Association: Handball Association of Ghana

Colours
1st	2nd

Results

African Championship
- Appearances: 1 (First in 1985)
- Best result: 9th (1985)
- Last updated on Unknown.

The Ghana women's national handball team is the national handball team of Ghana.

== African Championship record ==
- 1985 – 9th place
