= Uganda women's national handball team =

Uganda

Information
- Nickname: Nile Queens
- Association: Uganda Handball Federation
- Coach: Mr. Jimmy Remie Orotin

Colours
1st	2nd

Results

African Championship
- Appearances: 4 (First in 1974)
- Best result: 4th (1974)
- Last updated on Unknown.

The Uganda women's national handball team is the national team of Uganda. It is governed by the Uganda Handball Federation and takes part in international handball competitions.

== African Championship record ==
- 1974 – 4th
- 1976 – 4th
- 1979 – 5th
- 2024 – 11th
- 2026 – Qualified
