= 2006 African Women's Handball Championship =

2006 African Women's Championship
Tournament details
- Host country: Tunisia
- Venues: 3 (in 3 host cities)
- Dates: 12–20 January
- Teams: 7 (from 1 confederation)

Final positions
- Champions: Angola (8th title)
- Runners-up: Tunisia
- Third place: Congo
- Fourth place: Ivory Coast

Tournament statistics
- Matches played: 14
- Goals scored: 731 (52.21 per match)

Awards
- Best player: Gisèle Donguet ( (Republic of the Congo) )

The 2006 African Women's Handball Championship was the 17th edition of the African Women's Handball Championship, held in Tunisia from 12 to 20 January 2006. It acted as the African qualifying tournament for the 2007 World Women's Handball Championship.

== Preliminary round ==
All times are local (UTC+1).

=== Group A ===
Team	Pld	W	D	L	GF	GA	GD	Pts
Congo	2	2	0	0	59	41	+18	4
Ivory Coast	2	0	1	1	50	55	−5	1
Cameroon	2	0	1	1	45	58	−13	1

12 January 2006; 16:30	Congo	31–18	Cameroon	Arena Sport Center, Ariana
12 January 2006; 16:30		(11–9)		Arena Sport Center, Ariana

14 January 2006; 16:30	Congo	28–23	Ivory Coast	Arena Sport Center, Ariana
14 January 2006; 16:30		(16–11)		Arena Sport Center, Ariana

16 January 2006; 16:30	Ivory Coast	27–27	Cameroon	Arena Sport Center, Ariana
16 January 2006; 16:30		(15–14)		Arena Sport Center, Ariana

=== Group B ===
Team	Pld	W	D	L	GF	GA	GD	Pts
Angola	3	2	1	0	116	54	+62	5
Tunisia (H)	3	2	1	0	86	50	+36	5
DR Congo	3	1	0	2	64	89	−25	2
Gabon	3	0	0	3	52	125	−73	0

(H) Hosts

10 January 2006; 16:30	Tunisia	39–17	Gabon	Salle Omnisport de Rades, Radès
10 January 2006; 16:30		(19–7)		Salle Omnisport de Rades, Radès

11 January 2006; 14:30	Angola	55–12	Gabon	Salle Omnisport de Rades, Radès
11 January 2006; 14:30		(28–7)		Salle Omnisport de Rades, Radès

12 January 2006; 16:30	Angola	40–21	DR Congo	Salle Omnisport de Rades, Radès
12 January 2006; 16:30		(18–11)		Salle Omnisport de Rades, Radès

14 January 2006; 16:30	Tunisia	26–12	DR Congo	Salle Omnisport de Rades, Radès
14 January 2006; 16:30		(16–5)		Salle Omnisport de Rades, Radès

16 January 2006; 16:30	Angola	21–21	Tunisia	Salle Omnisport de Rades, Radès
16 January 2006; 16:30		(10–8)		Salle Omnisport de Rades, Radès

16 January 2006; 20:30	DR Congo	31–23	Gabon	Salle Omnisport de Rades, Radès
16 January 2006; 20:30		(12–10)		Salle Omnisport de Rades, Radès

== Knockout stage ==
=== Bracket ===
Semifinals
Congo	21
Tunisia	24
Ivory Coast	28
Angola (OT)	29

Final
Tunisia	30
Angola	32
Third place
Congo	22
Ivory Coast	15

=== Semifinals ===
18 January 2006; 16:30	Tunisia	24–21	Congo	Salle Omnisport de Rades, Radès
18 January 2006; 16:30		(11–11)		Salle Omnisport de Rades, Radès

18 January 2006
16:30
Angola
29–28 (ET)
Ivory Coast
El Menzah Sports Palace, Tunis

FT: 20–20 ET: 5–5, 4–3

=== Fifth place game ===
19 January 2006; 14:30	Cameroon	31–27	DR Congo	El Menzah Sports Palace, Tunis
19 January 2006; 14:30		(12–13)		El Menzah Sports Palace, Tunis

=== Third place game ===
19 January 2006; 16:30	Congo	22–15	Ivory Coast	El Menzah Sports Palace, Tunis
19 January 2006; 16:30		(11–6)		El Menzah Sports Palace, Tunis

=== Final ===
20 January 2006; 18:30	Angola	32–30	Tunisia	Salle Omnisport de Rades, Radès
20 January 2006; 18:30		(18–15)		Salle Omnisport de Rades, Radès

== Final ranking ==
Qualified for the 2007 World Championship

Rank	Team
Gold medal	Angola
Silver medal	Tunisia
Bronze medal	Congo
4	Ivory Coast
5	Cameroon
6	DR Congo
7	Gabon

== All-star team ==
- MVP : Gisèle Donguet (Congo)
- Goalkeeper : Nour Naïri (Tunisia)
- Left wing : Céline Dongo (Ivory Coast)
- Right wing : Gisèle Donguet (Congo)
- Centre back : Raja Toumi (Tunisia)
- Pivot : Elzira Tavares (Angola)
- Right back : Ilda Bengue (Angola)
- Left back : Sandrine Kibamba (Congo)
