= 1979 African Women's Handball Championship =

1979 African Women's Championship
Tournament details
- Host country: Congo
- Venue: 1 (in 1 host city)
- Dates: 20–31 July
- Teams: 9 (from 1 confederation)

Final positions
- Champions: Congo (1st title)
- Runners-up: Cameroon
- Third place: Algeria
- Fourth place: Ivory Coast

The 1979 African Women's Handball Championship was the third edition of the African Women's Handball Championship, held in Congo from 20 to 31 July 1979. It acted as the African qualifying tournament for the 1980 Summer Olympics qualifying tournament.

== Knockout stage ==
=== Bracket ===
Semi-finals
Cameroon	26
Algeria	18
Congo
Ivory Coast

Final
Congo	21
Cameroon	17
Third place
Algeria	19
Ivory Coast	12

=== Semifinals ===
Cameroon	26–18	Algeria

Congo	v	Ivory Coast

=== Third place game ===
Algeria	19–12	Ivory Coast

=== Final ===
Congo	21–17	Cameroon
	(13–10)

== Final ranking ==
Qualified for the 1980 Summer Olympics qualifying tournament

Rank	Team
Gold medal	Congo
Silver medal	Cameroon
Bronze medal	Algeria
4	Ivory Coast
5	Uganda
6	Nigeria
7	Togo
8	Benin
9	Gabon
