= 2000 African Women's Handball Championship =

2000 women's handball championship

2000 African Women's Championship
Tournament details
- Host country: Algeria
- Venues: 2 (in 2 host cities)
- Dates: 23 April – 1 May
- Teams: 8 (from 1 confederation)

Final positions
- Champions: Angola (5th title)
- Runners-up: Congo
- Third place: Tunisia
- Fourth place: Cameroon

Tournament statistics
- Matches played: 18
- Goals scored: 816 (45.33 per match)

The 2000 African Women's Handball Championship was the 14th edition of the African Women's Handball Championship, held in Algeria from 23 April to 1 May 2000. It acted as the African qualifying tournament for the 2001 World Women's Handball Championship.

== Preliminary round ==
All times are local (UTC+1).

=== Group A ===
Team	Pld	W	D	L	GF	GA	GD	Pts
Angola	3	3	0	0	80	59	+21	6
Tunisia	3	2	0	1	79	73	+6	4
Ivory Coast	3	1	0	2	64	52	+12	2
Senegal	3	0	0	3	53	92	−39	0

23 April 2000; 14:30	Angola	30–22	Tunisia	Salle Hacène Harcha, Algiers
23 April 2000; 14:30		(17–12)		Salle Hacène Harcha, Algiers

23 April 2000; 14:30	Ivory Coast	26–11	Senegal	Salle de Gue Constantine, Constantine
23 April 2000; 14:30		(12–5)		Salle de Gue Constantine, Constantine

25 April 2000; 14:30	Angola	30–19	Senegal	Salle Hacène Harcha, Algiers
25 April 2000; 14:30		(15–7)		Salle Hacène Harcha, Algiers

25 April 2000; 14:30	Tunisia	21–20	Ivory Coast	Salle de Gue Constantine, Constantine
25 April 2000; 14:30		(11–12)		Salle de Gue Constantine, Constantine

27 April 2000; 14:30	Tunisia	36–23	Senegal	Salle Hacène Harcha, Algiers
27 April 2000; 14:30		(16–8)		Salle Hacène Harcha, Algiers

27 April 2000; 16:30	Angola	20–18	Ivory Coast	Salle Hacène Harcha, Algiers
27 April 2000; 16:30		(8–10)		Salle Hacène Harcha, Algiers

=== Group B ===
Team	Pld	W	D	L	GF	GA	GD	Pts
Congo	3	3	0	0	80	48	+32	6
Cameroon	3	2	0	1	72	62	+10	4
Algeria (H)	3	1	0	2	72	61	+11	2
Gabon	3	0	0	3	40	93	−53	0

(H) Hosts

22 April 2000; 18:30	Cameroon	25–23	Algeria	Salle Hacène Harcha, Algiers
22 April 2000; 18:30		(14–13)		Salle Hacène Harcha, Algiers

22 April 2000; 18:30	Congo	35–10	Gabon	Salle Hacène Harcha, Algiers
22 April 2000; 18:30		(14–4)		Salle Hacène Harcha, Algiers

24 April 2000; 14:30	Congo	21–18	Algeria	Salle Hacène Harcha, Algiers
24 April 2000; 14:30		(11–9)		Salle Hacène Harcha, Algiers

24 April 2000; 16:30	Cameroon	27–15	Gabon	Salle de Gue Constantine, Constantine
24 April 2000; 16:30		(13–6)		Salle de Gue Constantine, Constantine

26 April 2000; 14:30	Congo	24–20	Cameroon	Salle Hacène Harcha, Algiers
26 April 2000; 14:30		(14–9)		Salle Hacène Harcha, Algiers

26 April 2000; 16:30	Algeria	31–15	Gabon	Salle Hacène Harcha, Algiers
26 April 2000; 16:30		(14–6)		Salle Hacène Harcha, Algiers

== Knockout stage ==
=== Bracket ===
Semifinals
Angola	26
Cameroon	21
Tunisia	16
Congo	24

Final
Angola	30
Congo	21
Third place
Cameroon	33
Tunisia (OT)	34

=== Semifinals ===
29 April 2000; 14:30	Congo	24–16	Tunisia	Salle Hacène Harcha, Algiers
29 April 2000; 14:30		(12–7)		Salle Hacène Harcha, Algiers

29 April 2000; 16:30	Angola	26–21	Cameroon	Salle de Gue Constantine, Constantine
29 April 2000; 16:30		(13–13)		Salle de Gue Constantine, Constantine

=== Seventh place game ===
30 April 2000; 14:30	Senegal	18–14	Gabon	Salle de Gue Constantine, Constantine
30 April 2000; 14:30		(11–6)		Salle de Gue Constantine, Constantine

=== Fifth place game ===
30 April 2000; 14:30	Ivory Coast	24–15	Algeria	Salle Hacène Harcha, Algiers
30 April 2000; 14:30		(9–6)		Salle Hacène Harcha, Algiers

=== Third place game ===
30 April 2000
16:30
Tunisia
34–33 (ET)
Cameroon
Salle Hacène Harcha, Algiers

(13–10)

FT: 25–25 ET: 2–2, 7–6

=== Final ===
1 May 2000	Angola	30–21	Congo	Salle Hacène Harcha, Algiers
1 May 2000		(14–10)		Salle Hacène Harcha, Algiers

== Final ranking ==
Qualified for the 2001 World Championship

Rank	Team
Gold medal	Angola
Silver medal	Congo
Bronze medal	Tunisia
4	Cameroon
5	Ivory Coast
6	Algeria
7	Senegal
8	Gabon
