= DR Congo women's national handball team =

Democratic Republic of the Congo

Information
- Association: Democratic Republic of the Congo Handball Federation
- Coach: Célestin Mpoua
- Assistant coach: Jean-Claude Alekasango; Guy Konoha
- Captain: Christianne Mwasesa

Colours
1st	2nd

Results

World Championship
- Appearances: 3 (First in 2013)
- Best result: 20th (2013, 2019)

African Championship
- Appearances: 13 (First in 1992)
- Best result: 2nd (2014)
- Last updated on Unknown.

The Democratic Republic of the Congo women's national handball team is the national team of the Democratic Republic of the Congo. It is governed by the Democratic Republic of the Congo Handball Federation and takes part in international handball competitions.

== Results ==
=== World Championships ===
- 2013 – 20th
- 2015 – 24th
- 2019 – 20th

=== African Nations Championship ===
- 1992 – 8th (as Zaire)
- 2002 – 8th
- 2004 – 7th
- 2006 – 6th
- 2008 – 5th
- 2010 – 8th
- 2012 – 3rd
- 2014 – 2nd
- 2016 – 8th
- 2018 – 3rd
- 2021 – 6th
- 2022 – 6th
- 2024 – 5th
- 2026 – Qualified

== Squad ==
Squad for the 2019 World Women's Handball Championship.

Head coach: (France) Machy Clément and (France) Francis Tuzolana
Steward: (Democratic Republic of the Congo) Vivi Mbula
physiotherapist: (France) Chloé Simon

No.	Pos.	Name	Date of birth (age)	Height	App.	Goals	Club
97	CB	Alexia Shunu	17 September 1997 (age 29)	170 cm			(Portugal) SL Benfica
14	LB	Albavie Mwadi-Kabamba	14 May 2002 (age 24)	173cm			(France) SPUC Handball
42	P	Isaure Mosabau	10 June 1994 (age 32)	171cm			(France) Noisy-le-Grand Handball
9	LB	Christianne Mwasesa	23 March 1985 (age 41)	175cm			(Angola) Primeiro de Agosto
7	LB	Laugane Pina	2 June 2002 (age 24)	178cm			(France) Paris 92
21		Yvernellie Kouelamambou	12 June 2001 (age 25)				(France) Rosières Saint Julien Troyes
1	GK	Elikia Mampuya	26 June 2002 (age 24)	175cm			(France) Club Harnes
26	RB	Laura Ingala	26 September 2002 (age 24)	177cm			(France) Lomme Lille
8	LB	Mélissa Agathe	6 June 1994 (age 32)	175cm			(France) Fleury Loiret HB
72	GK	Cecilia Errin	13 December 1998 (age 27)	184cm			(France) HBC Nantes
65	P	Yasmine Massa	10 May 2000 (age 26)	180cm			(France) Toulouse FH
4		Miguel Esmeralda	1 January 2000 (age 26)				(Portugal) CDES Gil Eanes
12	GK	Audília Carlos	23 June 1998 (age 28)	181cm			(Portugal) SL Benfica
2	RB	Vanessa Moesta	16 December 1992 (age 33)	168cm			(France) Zayen LA HBF
6	RB	Falonne Yabon	7 December 1986 (age 39)	168cm			(France) Kingershein-Mulhouse Handball
88	LB	Anita Kieny	6 May 1999 (age 27)				(France) ASPTT Strasbourg
16	GK	Nganmogne Audrey	14 November 1994 (age 31)				(France) Floirac Handball
83	CB	Leslie Ayong	9 December 2002 (age 23)	174cm			(France) Le Havre AC
63	P	Alicia Deghaud	10 August 2001 (age 25)	170cm			(France) Lomme Lille
11	P	Véra Ngona	1 January 2000 (age 26)
98	RB	Jannela Blonbou	4 October 1998 (age 28)	179cm			(France) Paris 92
