= 2004 African Women's Handball Championship =

2004 African Women's Championship
Tournament details
- Host country: Egypt
- Venues: 3 (in 1 host city)
- Dates: 9–18 April
- Teams: 8 (from 1 confederation)

Final positions
- Champions: Angola (7th title)
- Runners-up: Cameroon
- Third place: Ivory Coast
- Fourth place: Tunisia

Tournament statistics
- Matches played: 20
- Goals scored: 1,113 (55.65 per match)

Awards
- Best player: Nair Almeida

The 2004 African Women's Handball Championship was the 16th edition of the African Women's Handball Championship, held in Egypt from 9 to 18 April 2004. It acted as the African qualifying tournament for the 2005 World Women's Handball Championship.

== Preliminary round ==
All times are local (UTC+2).

=== Group A ===
Team	Pld	W	D	L	GF	GA	GD	Pts
Cameroon	3	3	0	0	92	73	+19	6
Angola	3	2	0	1	97	70	+27	4
Egypt (H)	3	1	0	2	79	96	−17	2
DR Congo	3	0	0	3	61	90	−29	0

(H) Hosts

9 April 2004; 15:00	Cameroon	28–27	Angola	Police Union Hall, Cairo
9 April 2004; 15:00		(10–9)		Police Union Hall, Cairo

9 April 2004; 16:00	Egypt	27–25	DR Congo	Media Hall, Cairo
9 April 2004; 16:00		(13–10)		Media Hall, Cairo

12 April 2004; 11:00	Cameroon	33–27	Egypt	Police Union Hall, Cairo
12 April 2004; 11:00		(19–9)		Police Union Hall, Cairo

12 April 2004; 15:00	Angola	32–17	DR Congo	Cairo Main Hall, Cairo
12 April 2004; 15:00		(17–9)		Cairo Main Hall, Cairo

13 April 2004; 16:00	Angola	38–25	Egypt	Police Union Hall, Cairo
13 April 2004; 16:00		(19–12)		Police Union Hall, Cairo

13 April 2004; 17:00	Cameroon	31–19	DR Congo	Media Hall, Cairo
13 April 2004; 17:00		(14–13)		Media Hall, Cairo

=== Group B ===
Team	Pld	W	D	L	GF	GA	GD	Pts
Tunisia	3	3	0	0	114	65	+49	6
Ivory Coast	3	2	0	1	108	79	+29	4
Congo	3	1	0	2	95	77	+18	2
Tanzania	3	0	0	3	42	138	−96	0

10 April 2004; 15:00	Tunisia	29–24	Congo	Cairo Main Hall, Cairo
10 April 2004; 15:00		(16–12)		Cairo Main Hall, Cairo

10 April 2004; 15:00	Ivory Coast	44–17	Tanzania	Police Union Hall, Cairo
10 April 2004; 15:00		(21–9)		Police Union Hall, Cairo

12 April 2004; 13:00	Tunisia	55–13	Tanzania	Police Union Hall, Cairo
12 April 2004; 13:00		(28–5)		Police Union Hall, Cairo

12 April 2004; 17:00	Ivory Coast	36–32	Congo	Cairo Main Hall, Cairo
12 April 2004; 17:00		(13–17)		Cairo Main Hall, Cairo

13 April 2004; 15:00	Congo	39–12	Tanzania	Cairo Main Hall, Cairo
13 April 2004; 15:00		(14–6)		Cairo Main Hall, Cairo

13 April 2004; 19:00	Tunisia	30–28	Ivory Coast	Media Hall, Cairo
13 April 2004; 19:00		(13–12)		Media Hall, Cairo

== Knockout stage ==
=== Bracket ===
Semifinals
Cameroon	27
Ivory Coast	25
Angola (OT)	31
Tunisia	28

Final
Cameroon	20
Angola	31
Third place
Ivory Coast	24
Tunisia	22

5–8th place bracket

5–8th place semifinals
Egypt	37
Tanzania	22
DR Congo	24
Congo	34

Fifth place
Egypt	20
Congo	32
Seventh place
Tanzania	17
DR Congo	31

=== 5–8th place semifinals ===
14 April 2004; 17:00	Egypt	27–22	Tanzania	Media Hall, Cairo
14 April 2004; 17:00		(14–9)		Media Hall, Cairo

14 April 2004; 17:00	Congo	34–24	DR Congo	Cairo Main Hall, Cairo
14 April 2004; 17:00		(16–11)		Cairo Main Hall, Cairo

=== Semifinals ===
16 April 2004; 14:00	Cameroon	27–25	Ivory Coast	Media Hall, Cairo
16 April 2004; 14:00		(14–13)		Media Hall, Cairo

16 April 2004
17:00
Angola
31–28 (ET)
Tunisia
Media Hall, Cairo

(14–13)

FT: 26–26 ET: 5–2

=== Seventh place game ===
16 April 2004; 10:00	DR Congo	31–17	Tanzania	Media Hall, Cairo
16 April 2004; 10:00		(19–8)		Media Hall, Cairo

=== Fifth place game ===
16 April 2004; 14:00	Congo	32–20	Egypt	Media Hall, Cairo
16 April 2004; 14:00		(15–14)		Media Hall, Cairo

=== Third place game ===
17 April 2004; 16:00	Ivory Coast	24–22	Tunisia	Media Hall, Cairo
17 April 2004; 16:00		(14–13)		Media Hall, Cairo

=== Final ===
18 April 2004; 16:00	Angola	31–20	Cameroon	Cairo Main Hall, Cairo
18 April 2004; 16:00		(14–10)		Cairo Main Hall, Cairo

== Final ranking ==
Qualified for the 2005 World Championship

Rank	Team
Gold medal	Angola
Silver medal	Cameroon
Bronze medal	Ivory Coast
4	Tunisia
5	Congo
6	Egypt
7	DR Congo
8	Tanzania
