= 2008 African Women's Handball Championship =

2008 African Women's Championship
Tournament details
- Host country: Angola
- Venues: 3 (in 3 host cities)
- Dates: 8–16 January
- Teams: 8 (from 1 confederation)

Final positions
- Champions: Angola (9th title)
- Runners-up: Ivory Coast
- Third place: Congo
- Fourth place: Tunisia

Tournament statistics
- Matches played: 20
- Goals scored: 1,060 (53 per match)
- Top scorers: (Ivory Coast) Mambo Elodie (39 goals)

Awards
- Best player: (Angola) Nair Almeida

The 2008 African Women's Handball Championship was the 18th edition of the African Women's Handball Championship, held in Angola from 8 to 17 January 2008. It acted as the African qualifying tournament for the 2009 World Women's Handball Championship and the 2008 Summer Olympics.

== Preliminary round ==
All times are local (UTC+1).

=== Group A ===
Team	Pld	W	D	L	GF	GA	GD	Pts
Angola (H)	3	3	0	0	110	63	+47	6
Congo	3	2	0	1	88	74	+14	4
Algeria	3	1	0	2	70	90	−20	2
Gabon	3	0	0	3	43	84	−41	0

(H) Hosts

8 January 2008; 10:00	Congo	30–14	Gabon	Pavilhão Multiusos, Luanda
8 January 2008; 10:00		(18–5)		Pavilhão Multiusos, Luanda

8 January 2008; 20:30	Angola	42–24	Algeria	Pavilhão Multiusos, Luanda
8 January 2008; 20:30		(20–11)		Pavilhão Multiusos, Luanda

11 January 2008; 16:00	Algeria	21–20	Gabon	Acácias Rubras, Benguela
11 January 2008; 16:00		(14–9)		Acácias Rubras, Benguela

11 January 2008; 18:00	Angola	35–30	Congo	Acácias Rubras, Benguela
11 January 2008; 18:00		(16–17)		Acácias Rubras, Benguela

12 January 2008; 16:00	Angola	33–9	Gabon	Acácias Rubras, Benguela
12 January 2008; 16:00		(16–3)		Acácias Rubras, Benguela

12 January 2008; 18:00	Congo	28–25	Algeria	Acácias Rubras, Benguela
12 January 2008; 18:00		(11–15)		Acácias Rubras, Benguela

=== Group B ===
Team	Pld	W	D	L	GF	GA	GD	Pts
Ivory Coast	3	2	1	0	77	55	+22	5
Tunisia	3	1	2	0	87	72	+15	4
DR Congo	3	1	0	2	70	90	−20	2
Cameroon	3	0	1	2	62	79	−17	1

10 January 2008; 16:00	Ivory Coast	26–16	DR Congo	Serra Van-Dúnem, Huambo
10 January 2008; 16:00		(14–7)		Serra Van-Dúnem, Huambo

10 January 2008; 18:00	Tunisia	23–23	Cameroon	Serra Van-Dúnem, Huambo
10 January 2008; 18:00		(12–11)		Serra Van-Dúnem, Huambo

11 January 2008; 16:00	Ivory Coast	24–24	Tunisia	Serra Van-Dúnem, Huambo
11 January 2008; 16:00		(14–11)		Serra Van-Dúnem, Huambo

11 January 2008; 18:00	DR Congo	29–24	Cameroon	Serra Van-Dúnem, Huambo
11 January 2008; 18:00		(16–9)		Serra Van-Dúnem, Huambo

12 January 2008; 16:00	Tunisia	40–25	DR Congo	Serra Van-Dúnem, Huambo
12 January 2008; 16:00		(20–8)		Serra Van-Dúnem, Huambo

12 January 2008; 18:00	Ivory Coast	27–15	Cameroon	Serra Van-Dúnem, Huambo
12 January 2008; 18:00		(10–5)		Serra Van-Dúnem, Huambo

== Knockout stage ==
=== Bracket ===
Semifinals
Angola	44
Tunisia	26
Congo	28
Ivory Coast	29

Final
Angola	39
Ivory Coast	27
Third place
Tunisia	25
Congo	30

5–8th place bracket

5–8th place semifinals
Algeria	34
Cameroon	32
Gabon	11
DR Congo	21

Fifth place
Algeria	28
DR Congo	32
Seventh place
Cameroon	25
Gabon	22

=== 5–8th place semifinals ===
14 January 2008; 15:00	DR Congo	21–11	Gabon	Acácias Rubras, Benguela
14 January 2008; 15:00		(7–6)		Acácias Rubras, Benguela

14 January 2008; 17:00	Algeria	34–32	Cameroon	Acácias Rubras, Benguela
14 January 2008; 17:00		(17–18)		Acácias Rubras, Benguela

=== Semifinals ===
15 January 2008; 16:00	Ivory Coast	29–28	Congo	Pavilhão Multiusos, Luanda
15 January 2008; 16:00		(13–13)		Pavilhão Multiusos, Luanda

15 January 2008; 20:00	Angola	44–26	Tunisia	Pavilhão Multiusos, Luanda
15 January 2008; 20:00		(19–9)		Pavilhão Multiusos, Luanda

=== Seventh place game ===
15 January 2008; 15:00	Cameroon	25–22	Gabon	Acácias Rubras, Benguela
15 January 2008; 15:00		(12–14)		Acácias Rubras, Benguela

=== Fifth place game ===
15 January 2008; 17:00	DR Congo	32–28	Algeria	Acácias Rubras, Benguela
15 January 2008; 17:00		(14–16)		Acácias Rubras, Benguela

=== Third place game ===
16 January 2008; 16:00	Congo	30–25	Tunisia	Pavilhão Multiusos, Luanda
16 January 2008; 16:00		(14–15)		Pavilhão Multiusos, Luanda

=== Final ===
16 January 2008; 18:00	Angola	39–27	Ivory Coast	Pavilhão Multiusos, Luanda
16 January 2008; 18:00		(18–13)		Pavilhão Multiusos, Luanda

== Final ranking ==
Angola qualified also for the 2008 Summer Olympics and the Ivory Coast and Congo participated at a 2008 Summer Olympics qualification tournament.

Qualified for the 2009 World Championship

Rank	Team
Gold medal	Angola
Silver medal	Ivory Coast
Bronze medal	Congo
4	Tunisia
5	DR Congo
6	Algeria
7	Cameroon
8	Gabon

== Awards ==
- Most Valuable Player:Nair Almeida (ANG)
- Top scorer:N'Cho Elodie Mambo (CIV), 39 goals

All-star team

- Maria Pedro (ANG)
- Nair Almeida (ANG)
- Marcelina Kiala (ANG)
- Isabel Fernandes (ANG)
- Ndona Bassarila (CGO)
- Chantal Okoye (CGO)
- Hela Msaad (TUN)
