= 2010 African Women's Handball Championship =

2010 African Championship

Tournament details
- Host country: Egypt
- Venues: 2 (in 2 host cities)
- Dates: 10–21 February
- Teams: 8 (from 1 confederation)

Final positions
- Champions: Angola (10th title)
- Runners-up: Tunisia
- Third place: Ivory Coast
- Fourth place: Algeria

Tournament statistics
- Matches played: 24
- Goals scored: 1,280 (53.33 per match)
- Top scorers: Mwange Mwasesa (COD) (54 goals)

Awards
- Best player: Mouna Chebbah (TUN)

The 2010 African Women's Handball Championship was the 19th edition of the African Women's Handball Championship, organized by the African Handball Confederation, which acted as the qualification process for the 2011 World Women's Handball Championship. It was held in Cairo and Suez Egypt between 10 and 21 February 2010.

== Teams ==
Group A	Group B
Ivory Coast; Algeria; Tunisia; Cameroon	Congo DR; Congo; Angola; Egypt

== Preliminary round ==
All times are local (UTC+2).

=== Group A ===
Team	Pld	W	D	L	GF	GA	GD	Pts
Tunisia	3	3	0	0	91	66	+25	6
Ivory Coast	3	2	0	1	66	65	+1	4
Algeria	3	1	0	2	63	80	−17	2
Cameroon	3	0	0	3	57	66	−9	0

11 February 2010; 13:00	Ivory Coast	22–19	Algeria	Middle Hall, Cairo
11 February 2010; 13:00		(16–11)		Middle Hall, Cairo
11 February 2010; 13:00		Report		Middle Hall, Cairo

11 February 2010; 17:00	Tunisia	25–19	Cameroon	Middle Hall, Cairo
11 February 2010; 17:00		(11–9)		Middle Hall, Cairo
11 February 2010; 17:00		Report		Middle Hall, Cairo

12 February 2010; 16:00	Cameroon	15–17	Ivory Coast	Main Hall, Cairo
12 February 2010; 16:00		(7–9)		Main Hall, Cairo
12 February 2010; 16:00		Report		Main Hall, Cairo

12 February 2010; 16:00	Algeria	20–35	Tunisia	Middle Hall, Cairo
12 February 2010; 16:00		(11–20)		Middle Hall, Cairo
12 February 2010; 16:00		Report		Middle Hall, Cairo

13 February 2010; 14:00	Cameroon	23–24	Algeria	Main Hall, Cairo
13 February 2010; 14:00		(13–12)		Main Hall, Cairo
13 February 2010; 14:00		Report		Main Hall, Cairo

13 February 2010; 16:00	Ivory Coast	27–31	Tunisia	Main Hall, Cairo
13 February 2010; 16:00		(13–13)		Main Hall, Cairo
13 February 2010; 16:00		Report		Main Hall, Cairo

=== Group B ===
Team	Pld	W	D	L	GF	GA	GD	Pts
Angola	3	2	1	0	81	61	+20	5
Congo	3	1	2	0	89	83	+6	4
Egypt (H)	3	0	2	1	77	88	−11	2
Congo DR	3	0	1	2	75	90	−15	1

(H) Hosts

11 February 2010; 13:00	Congo	37–31	Congo DR	Al Nasr, Suez
11 February 2010; 13:00		(20–18)		Al Nasr, Suez
11 February 2010; 13:00		Report		Al Nasr, Suez

11 February 2010; 19:00	Angola	32–21	Egypt	Al Nasr, Suez
11 February 2010; 19:00		(14–13)		Al Nasr, Suez
11 February 2010; 19:00		Report		Al Nasr, Suez

12 February 2010; 15:00	Congo DR	15–24	Angola	Al Nasr, Suez
12 February 2010; 15:00		(7–13)		Al Nasr, Suez
12 February 2010; 15:00		Report		Al Nasr, Suez

12 February 2010; 19:00	Egypt	27–27	Congo	Al Nasr, Suez
12 February 2010; 19:00		(14–17)		Al Nasr, Suez
12 February 2010; 19:00		Report		Al Nasr, Suez

13 February 2010; 16:00	Angola	25–25	Congo	Al Nasr, Suez
13 February 2010; 16:00		(13–16)		Al Nasr, Suez
13 February 2010; 16:00		Report		Al Nasr, Suez

13 February 2010; 18:00	Congo DR	29–29	Egypt	Al Nasr, Suez
13 February 2010; 18:00		(12–15)		Al Nasr, Suez
13 February 2010; 18:00		Report		Al Nasr, Suez

== Ranking round ==
Placement matches
February 16 – Cairo
Egypt	31
Cameroon	27
February 16 – Cairo
Congo	29
Congo DR	24

5th/6th place
February 18 – Cairo
Egypt	26
Congo	29
7th/8th place
February 18 – Cairo
Cameroon	30
Congo DR	28

=== Placement matches ===
16 February 2010; 14:00	Egypt	31–27	Cameroon	Main Hall, Cairo
16 February 2010; 14:00		(15–15)		Main Hall, Cairo
16 February 2010; 14:00		Report		Main Hall, Cairo

16 February 2010; 18:30	Congo	29–24	Congo DR	Middle Hall, Cairo
16 February 2010; 18:30		(17–8)		Middle Hall, Cairo
16 February 2010; 18:30		Report		Middle Hall, Cairo

=== Seventh place play-off ===
18 February 2010; 12:00	Cameroon	30–28	Congo DR	Middle Hall, Cairo
18 February 2010; 12:00		(10–11)		Middle Hall, Cairo
18 February 2010; 12:00		Report		Middle Hall, Cairo

=== Fifth place play-off ===
18 February 2010; 14:30	Egypt	26–29	Congo	Middle Hall, Cairo
18 February 2010; 14:30		(12–17)		Middle Hall, Cairo
18 February 2010; 14:30		Report		Middle Hall, Cairo

== Final round ==
Quarter-finals
February 15 – Cairo
Cameroon	17
Angola	30
February 15 – Cairo
Ivory Coast	38
Egypt	32
February 15 – Cairo
Tunisia	40
Congo DR	23
February 15 – Cairo
Congo	26
Algeria	27

Semi-finals
February 18 – Cairo
Angola	27
Ivory Coast	24
February 18 – Cairo
Tunisia	36
Algeria	16

Final
February 20 – Cairo
Angola	31
Tunisia	30
Third place
February 20 – Cairo
Ivory Coast	32
Algeria	28

=== Quarterfinals ===
15 February 2010; 12:00	Cameroon	17–30	Angola	Middle Hall, Cairo
15 February 2010; 12:00		(11–16)		Middle Hall, Cairo
15 February 2010; 12:00		Report		Middle Hall, Cairo

15 February 2010; 14:30	Ivory Coast	38–32	Egypt	Middle Hall, Cairo
15 February 2010; 14:30		(17–14)		Middle Hall, Cairo
15 February 2010; 14:30		Report		Middle Hall, Cairo

15 February 2010; 17:00	Tunisia	40–23	Congo DR	Middle Hall, Cairo
15 February 2010; 17:00		(17–13)		Middle Hall, Cairo
15 February 2010; 17:00		Report		Middle Hall, Cairo

15 February 2010; 19:30	Congo	26–27	Algeria	Middle Hall, Cairo
15 February 2010; 19:30		(15–12)		Middle Hall, Cairo
15 February 2010; 19:30		Report		Middle Hall, Cairo

=== Semifinals ===
18 February 2010; 17:00	Angola	27–24	Ivory Coast	Main Hall, Cairo
18 February 2010; 17:00		(13–8)		Main Hall, Cairo
18 February 2010; 17:00		Report		Main Hall, Cairo

18 February 2010; 19:30	Tunisia	36–16	Algeria	Main Hall, Cairo
18 February 2010; 19:30		(16–11)		Main Hall, Cairo
18 February 2010; 19:30		Report		Main Hall, Cairo

=== Third place play-off ===
20 February 2010; 12:00	Ivory Coast	32–28	Algeria	Main Hall, Cairo
20 February 2010; 12:00		(17–13)		Main Hall, Cairo
20 February 2010; 12:00		Report		Main Hall, Cairo

=== Final ===
20 February 2010; 17:00	Angola	31–30	Tunisia	Main Hall, Cairo
20 February 2010; 17:00	Luísa 9	(14–13)	Khouildi 9	Main Hall, Cairo
20 February 2010; 17:00		Report		Main Hall, Cairo

== Final standings ==
Qualified for the 2011 World Championship

Rank	Team	Record
Gold medal	Angola	5–1–0
Silver medal	Tunisia	5–0–1
Bronze medal	Ivory Coast	4–0–2
4	Algeria	2–0–4
5	Congo	3–2–1
6	Egypt	1–2–2
7	Cameroon	1–0–4
8	DR Congo	0–1–4

== Awards ==
2010 African Women's Handball Championship

Angola
10th title

Best Player

== See also ==
2010 African Women's Handball Champions League
