= African Women's Handball Championship =

Women's national handball team tournament

- Current season, competition or edition: 2026 African Women's Handball Championship
- Sport: Handball
- Founded: 1974
- First season: 1974
- Continent: Africa (CAHB)
- Most recent champion: Angola (16th title)
- Most titles: Angola (16 titles)

The African Handball Nations Championship is the official competition for senior national handball teams of Africa, and takes place every two years. In addition to crowning the African champions, the tournament also serves as a qualifying tournament for the Summer Olympics and For World Handball Championship.

== Summary ==
Year	Host	Final			Third place match		
Year	Host	Champion	Score	Second place	Third place	Score	Fourth place
1974; Details	Tunisia	Tunisia	^{Round-robin}	Senegal	Uganda	^{Round-robin}	Egypt
1976; Details	Algeria	Tunisia	10–5	Congo	Algeria	10–8	Senegal
1979; Details	(Republic of the Congo); Congo	Congo	21–17	Cameroon	Algeria	19–12	Ivory Coast
1981; Details	Tunisia	Congo	11–10	Tunisia	Nigeria	–	Ivory Coast
1983; Details	Egypt	Congo	27–14	Nigeria	Cameroon	25–13	Ivory Coast
1985; Details	Angola	Congo	22–18	Ivory Coast	Cameroon	24–14	Nigeria
1987; Details	Morocco	Ivory Coast	–	Cameroon	Congo	–	Tunisia
1989; Details	Algeria	Angola	22–18	Ivory Coast	Congo	19–17	Algeria
1991; Details	Egypt	Nigeria	–	Angola	Congo	–	Algeria
1992; Details	Ivory Coast	Angola	–	Congo	Ivory Coast	20–16 (OT)	Nigeria
1994; Details	Tunisia	Angola	24–18	Ivory Coast	Algeria	20–13	Congo
1996; Details	Benin	Ivory Coast	35–19	Algeria	Angola	24–21	Congo
1998; Details	South Africa	Angola	31–23	Congo	Ivory Coast	30–28	Cameroon
2000; Details	Algeria	Angola	30–21	Congo	Tunisia	34–33	Cameroon
2002; Details	Morocco	Angola	30–21	Ivory Coast	Tunisia	31–20	Algeria
2004; Details	Egypt	Angola	31–20	Cameroon	Ivory Coast	24–22	Tunisia
2006; Details	Tunisia	Angola	32–30	Tunisia	Congo	22–15	Ivory Coast
2008; Details	Angola	Angola	39–27	Ivory Coast	Congo	30–25	Tunisia
2010; Details	Egypt	Angola	31–30	Tunisia	Ivory Coast	32–28	Algeria
2012; Details	Morocco	Angola	26–24	Tunisia	DR Congo	33–24	Algeria
2014; Details	Algeria	Tunisia	23–20	DR Congo	Angola	30–22	Algeria
2016; Details	Angola	Angola	36–17	Tunisia	Cameroon	Awarded	Congo
2018; Details	(Republic of the Congo); Congo	Angola	19–14	Senegal	DR Congo	33–22	Cameroon
2021; Details	Cameroon	Angola	25–15	Cameroon	Tunisia	22–17	Congo
2022; Details	Senegal	Angola	29–19	Cameroon	Congo	20–19	Senegal
2024; Details	(Democratic Republic of the Congo); DR Congo	Angola	27–18	Senegal	Tunisia	25–22	Egypt
2026; Details	Tunisia		–			–	

^n/a A round-robin tournament determined the final standings.

== Medal table ==
Rank	Nation	Gold	Silver	Bronze	Total
1	Angola	16	1	2	19
2	Congo	4	4	6	14
3	Tunisia	3	5	4	12
4	Ivory Coast	2	5	4	11
5	Nigeria	1	1	1	3
6	Cameroon	0	5	3	8
7	Senegal	0	3	0	3
8	Algeria	0	1	3	4
9	DR Congo	0	1	2	3
10	Uganda	0	0	1	1
Totals (10 entries)		26	26	26	78

== Participating nations ==
Legend

- 1st – Champions
- 2nd – Runners-up
- 3rd – Third place
- 4th – Fourth place
- Q — Qualified for upcoming tournament
- •• — Qualified but withdrew
- • — Did not qualify
- × — Did not enter / Withdrew from the Championship
- ×× — Disqualified / Banned
- — Hosts

Team	(Tunisia) 1974	(Algeria) 1976	(Republic of the Congo) 1979	(Tunisia) 1981	(Egypt) 1983	(Angola) 1985	(Morocco) 1987	(Algeria) 1989	(Egypt) 1991	(Ivory Coast) 1992	(Tunisia) 1994	(Benin) 1996	(South Africa) 1998	(Algeria) 2000	(Morocco) 2002	(Egypt) 2004	(Tunisia) 2006	(Angola) 2008	(Egypt) 2010	(Morocco) 2012	(Algeria) 2014	(Angola) 2016	(Republic of the Congo) 2018	(Cameroon) 2021	(Senegal) 2022	(Democratic Republic of the Congo) 2024	(Tunisia) 2026	Years
Algeria		3rd	3rd	5th	7th			4th	4th	5th	3rd	2nd		6th	4th			6th	4th	4th	4th	6th	8th	••	10th	8th	Q	20
Angola				7th	6th	5th	5th	1st	2nd	1st	1st	3rd	1st	1st	1st	1st	1st	1st	1st	1st	3rd	1st	1st	1st	1st	1st	Q	24
Benin			8th									••															Q	2
Cameroon			2nd		3rd	3rd	2nd	••				5th	4th	4th	5th	2nd	5th	7th	7th	5th	7th	3rd	4th	2nd	2nd	7th	Q	20
Cape Verde																								9th	12th	10th	Q	4
Chad								••																				0
Congo		2nd	1st	1st	1st	1st	3rd	3rd	3rd	2nd	4th	4th	2nd	2nd	6th	5th	3rd	3rd	5th	6th	5th	4th	5th	4th	3rd	6th	Q	26
DR Congo										8th	••				8th	7th	6th	5th	8th	3rd	2nd	8th	3rd	6th	6th	5th	Q	14
Egypt	3rd			6th	8th	7th	6th	5th	7th	••						6th			6th	9th					8th	4th	Q	13
Gabon			9th		9th		7th							8th	7th		7th	8th										7
Ghana						9th	••																					1
Guinea																					8th	7th	7th	7th	9th	9th	Q	7
Ivory Coast		7th	4th	4th	4th	2nd	1st	2nd	6th	3rd	2nd	1st	3rd	5th	2nd	3rd	4th	2nd	3rd	7th		5th	9th		7th			22
Kenya																								10th		12th		2
Madagascar																								11th	13th			2
Mali																											Q	1
Morocco							8th								9th					10th			10th		11th		Q	6
Mozambique												6th	5th															2
Nigeria		6th	6th	3rd	2nd	4th	••	••	1st	4th	5th													8th				9
Réunion																											Q	1
Senegal	2nd	5th				8th			5th	6th				7th						8th	6th	××	2nd	5th	4th	2nd	Q	14
South Africa													6th															1
Tanzania																8th												1
Togo			7th									7th																2
Tunisia	1st	1st		2nd	5th	6th	4th	6th		7th	6th			3rd	3rd	4th	2nd	4th	2nd	2nd	1st	2nd	6th	3rd	5th	3rd	Q	23
Uganda	4th	4th	5th																							11th	Q	5
Zambia																											Q	1
Total	4	7	9	7	9	9	8	6	7	8	6	7	6	8	9	8	7	8	8	10	8	9	10	11	13	12	16	

== Best player award ==
Year	Award Winner
2004	(Angola) Nair Almeida
2006	(Republic of the Congo) Gisèle Donguet
2008	(Angola) Nair Almeida
2010	(Tunisia) Mouna Chebbah
2012	(Tunisia) Mouna Chebbah
2016	(Angola) Natália Bernardo
2018	(Angola) Albertina Kassoma
2021	(Angola) Isabel Guialo
2022	(Angola) Helena Paulo
2024	(Republic of the Congo) Fanta Diagouraga

== See also ==
- African Women's Junior Handball Championship
- African Women's Youth Handball Championship
- African Women's Handball Champions League
