= Handball at the African Games =

- Handball
- Frequency: Every four years
- Inaugurated: 1965 (Republic of the Congo) Brazzaville
- Most recent: 2023 (Ghana) Accra
- Most successful team(s): M: Egypt (8 titles); W: Angola (8 titles)

Handball has been an African Games event since the first edition in 1965 in Brazzaville, Republic of the Congo.

== Men's tournaments ==
=== Summaries ===
| Year | Host | Final | | | Third Place Match |
| Year | Host | Gold Medal | Score | Silver Medal | Bronze Medal | Score | Fourth Place |
|---|---|---|---|---|---|---|---|
| 1965; Details | (Republic of the Congo) Brazzaville | United Arab Rep. | 22 – 7 | Ivory Coast | Tunisia | 13–10 | Madagascar |
| 1973; Details | (Nigeria) Lagos | Algeria | 14 – 12 | Egypt | Senegal | 17 – 7 | Ivory Coast |
| 1978; Details | (Algeria) Algiers | Algeria | 20 – 13 | Tunisia | Cameroon | 36 – 20 | Madagascar |
| 1987; Details | (Kenya) Nairobi | Algeria | 17 – 15 | Congo | Egypt | 17 – 11 | Cameroon |
| 1991; Details | (Egypt) Cairo | Egypt | ^{n/a} | Algeria | Nigeria | ^{n/a} | Cameroon |
| 1995; Details | (Zimbabwe) Harare | Egypt | ^{n/a} | Cameroon | Nigeria | ^{n/a} | Zimbabwe |
| 1999; Details | (South Africa) Johannesburg | Algeria | ^{n/a} | Egypt | Ghana | ^{n/a} | South Africa |
| 2003; Details | (Nigeria) Abuja | Egypt | 31 – 29 | Algeria | Nigeria | 35 – 33 | Senegal |
| 2007; Details | (Algeria) Algiers | Egypt | 29 – 21 | Algeria | Tunisia | 34 – 31 | Angola |
| 2011; Details | (Mozambique) Maputo | Egypt | 24 – 20 | Angola | Algeria | 25 – 24 | Senegal |
| 2015; Details | (Republic of the Congo) Brazzaville | Egypt | 25 – 23 | Angola | Congo | 32 – 29 | Nigeria |
| 2019; Details | (Morocco) Rabat^{1} | Angola | 31 – 25 | Egypt | Morocco | 25 – 22 | Algeria |
| 2023; Details | (Ghana) Accra | Egypt | 33 – 32 | DR Congo | Nigeria | 38 – 20 | Benin |

^n/a A round-robin tournament determined the final standings.
^1 Handball tournament held in Casablanca.

=== Participating nations ===
| Nation | 65 (Republic of the Congo) | 73 (Nigeria) | 78 (Algeria) | 87 (Kenya) | 91 (Egypt) | 95 (Zimbabwe) | 99 (South Africa) | 03 (Nigeria) | 07 (Algeria) | 11 (Mozambique) | 15 (Republic of the Congo) | 19 (Morocco) | 23 (Ghana) | Years |
|---|---|---|---|---|---|---|---|---|---|---|---|---|---|---|
| Algeria | | 1st | 1st | 1st | 2nd | | 1st | 2nd | 2nd | 3rd | | 4th | | 9 |
| Angola | | | | | | | | | 4th | 2nd | 2nd | 1st | | 4 |
| Benin | | | 6th | | | | | | | | | | 4th | 2 |
| Burkina Faso | | | | | | | | | | | | 9th | | 1 |
| Cameroon | | | 3rd | 4th | 4th | 2nd | | 5th | 5th | 6th | | | | 6 |
| Congo | 4th | | | 2nd | | | | | | 7th | 3rd | | | 4 |
| DR Congo | | | | | | | | 7th | | | 9th | 5th | 2nd | 4 |
| Ivory Coast | 2nd | | w/o | | | | | | 7th | | 7th | | | 4 |
| Egypt | 1st | 2nd | w/o | 3rd | 1st | 1st | 2nd | 1st | 1st | 1st | 1st | 2nd | 1st | 12 |
| Ethiopia | | | | | 6th | | | | | | | | | 1 |
| Gabon | | | | | | | | | | 9th | 6th | | | 2 |
| Ghana | | | | | | | 3rd | 6th | | 12th | | | 7th | 4 |
| Guinea | | | | | | | | | | | | 7th | | 1 |
| Kenya | | | | 7th | | | | | | 10th | 10th | | 5th | 4 |
| Libya | | | | | | | | | | | 5th | | | 1 |
| Madagascar | | | 4th | 6th | | | | | | 11th | | | | 2 |
| Mali | | | | | | | | | | | | | 6th | 1 |
| Morocco | | | | | | | | | | | | 3rd | | 1 |
| Mozambique | | | | | | | | | | 8th | | | | 1 |
| Nigeria | | 4th | | | 3rd | 3rd | | 3rd | 6th | 5th | 4th | 6th | 3rd | 9 |
| Senegal | | 3rd | 5th | 5th | 5th | | | 4th | | 4th | 8th | | | 5 |
| South Africa | | | | | | | 4th | 8th | | | | | | 2 |
| Togo | | | | | | | | | | | | | 8th | 1 |
| Tunisia | 3rd | | 2nd | | | | | | 3rd | | | | | 3 |
| Zambia | | | | | | | | | | | | 8th | | 1 |
| Zimbabwe | | | | | | 4th | | | | | | | | 1 |

Rq: The table is not complete.

== Women's tournaments ==
=== Summaries ===
| Year | Host | Final | | | Third Place Match |
| Year | Host | Gold Medal | Score | Silver Medal | Bronze Medal | Score | Fourth Place |
|---|---|---|---|---|---|---|---|
| 1978; Details | (Algeria) Algiers | Algeria | 17 – 12 | Cameroon | Tunisia | 19 – 6 | Ivory Coast |
| 1987; Details | (Kenya) Nairobi | Ivory Coast | 22 – 11 | Congo | Cameroon | 18 – 13 | Senegal |
| 1991; Details | (Egypt) Cairo | Angola | 23 – 19 | Ivory Coast | Nigeria | 31 – ?? | Senegal |
| 1995; Details | (Zimbabwe) Harare | Angola | 22 – 21 | Congo | Nigeria | – | Algeria |
| 1999; Details | (South Africa) Johannesburg | Angola | 29 – 19 | Congo | Cameroon | 30 – 25 | Algeria |
| 2003; Details | (Nigeria) Abuja | Cameroon | 28 – 27 | Ivory Coast | Angola | 35 – 27 | Congo |
| 2007; Details | (Algeria) Algiers | Angola | 35 – 22 | Congo | Ivory Coast | 25 – 24 | Cameroon |
| 2011; Details | (Mozambique) Maputo | Angola | 41 – 23 | Congo | Cameroon | 26 – 20 | Algeria |
| 2015; Details | (Republic of the Congo) Brazzaville | Angola | 33 – 29 | Cameroon | Senegal | 25 – 24 | Nigeria |
| 2019; Details | (Morocco) Rabat^{1} | Angola | 28 – 25 | Cameroon | DR Congo | 32 – 22 | Guinea |
| 2023; Details | (Ghana) Accra | Angola | 33 – 15 | DR Congo | Cameroon | 29 – 21 | Algeria |

^1 Handball tournament held in Casablanca.

=== Participating nations ===
| Nation | 78 (Algeria) | 87 (Kenya) | 91 (Egypt) | 95 (Zimbabwe) | 99 (South Africa) | 03 (Nigeria) | 07 (Algeria) | 11 (Mozambique) | 15 (Republic of the Congo) | 19 (Morocco) | 23 (Ghana) | Years |
|---|---|---|---|---|---|---|---|---|---|---|---|---|
| Algeria | 1st | | | 4th | 4th | 6th | 7th | 4th | | 6th | 4th | 8 |
| Angola | | | 1st | 1st | 1st | 3rd | 1st | 1st | 1st | 1st | 1st | 9 |
| Burkina Faso | | | | | | | | | 8th | | 7th | 2 |
| Cape Verde | | | | | | | | 8th | | | | 1 |
| Cameroon | 2nd | 3rd | | | 3rd | 1st | 4th | 3rd | 2nd | 2nd | 3rd | 9 |
| Congo | | 2nd | | 2nd | 2nd | 4th | 2nd | 2nd | 6th | | | 7 |
| DR Congo | | | | | | 7th | | 6th | 7th | 3rd | 2nd | 5 |
| Ivory Coast | 4th | 1st | 2nd | | 5th | 2nd | 3rd | | 5th | | | 7 |
| Egypt | 6th | | | 5th | | | | | | | | 2 |
| Ghana | | | | | | | | 10th | | | 6th | 2 |
| Guinea | | | | | | | | | | 4th | | 1 |
| Kenya | | | | | | 8th | 8th | 7th | 10th | 10th | | 5 |
| Madagascar | | | | | | | | 12th | | | | 1 |
| Mali | | | | | | | | | 9th | | 8th | 2 |
| Morocco | | | | | | | | | | 7th | | 1 |
| Mozambique | | | | | | | | 11th | | | | 1 |
| Nigeria | 5th | | 3rd | 3rd | | 5th | 5th | 5th | 4th | 9th | | 8 |
| Senegal | | 4th | 4th | | 6th | | | 9th | 3rd | | | 5 |
| South Africa | | | | | 7th | | | | | | | 1 |
| Tunisia | 3rd | | | | | | 6th | | | 5th | | 3 |
| Uganda | | | | 7th | | | | | | 8th | 5th | 3 |
| Zambia | | | | | | | | | 11th | | | 1 |
| Zimbabwe | | | | 6th | | | | | | | | 1 |

Rq: The table is not complete.

== Medal table ==
=== Men ===
| Rank | Nation | Gold | Silver | Bronze | Total |
|---|---|---|---|---|---|
| 1 | Egypt | 8 | 3 | 1 | 12 |
| 2 | Algeria | 4 | 3 | 1 | 8 |
| 3 | Angola | 1 | 2 | 0 | 3 |
| 4 | Tunisia | 0 | 1 | 2 | 3 |
| 5 | Cameroon | 0 | 1 | 1 | 2 |
| 5 | Congo | 0 | 1 | 1 | 2 |
| 7 | DR Congo | 0 | 1 | 0 | 1 |
| 7 | Ivory Coast | 0 | 1 | 0 | 1 |
| 9 | Nigeria | 0 | 0 | 4 | 4 |
| 10 | Ghana | 0 | 0 | 1 | 1 |
| 10 | Morocco | 0 | 0 | 1 | 1 |
| 10 | Senegal | 0 | 0 | 1 | 1 |
| Totals (12 entries) | | 13 | 13 | 13 | 39 |

=== Women ===
| Rank | Nation | Gold | Silver | Bronze | Total |
|---|---|---|---|---|---|
| 1 | Angola | 8 | 0 | 1 | 9 |
| 2 | Cameroon | 1 | 3 | 4 | 8 |
| 3 | Ivory Coast | 1 | 2 | 1 | 4 |
| 4 | Algeria | 1 | 0 | 0 | 1 |
| 5 | Congo | 0 | 5 | 0 | 5 |
| 6 | DR Congo | 0 | 1 | 1 | 2 |
| 7 | Nigeria | 0 | 0 | 2 | 2 |
| 8 | Senegal | 0 | 0 | 1 | 1 |
| 8 | Tunisia | 0 | 0 | 1 | 1 |
| Totals (9 entries) | | 11 | 11 | 11 | 33 |

=== Overall ===
| Rank | Nation | Gold | Silver | Bronze | Total |
|---|---|---|---|---|---|
| 1 | Angola (ANG) | 9 | 2 | 1 | 12 |
| 2 | Egypt (EGY) | 8 | 3 | 1 | 12 |
| 3 | Algeria (ALG) | 5 | 3 | 1 | 9 |
| 4 | Cameroon (CMR) | 1 | 4 | 5 | 10 |
| 5 | Ivory Coast (CIV) | 1 | 3 | 1 | 5 |
| 6 | Republic of the Congo (CGO) | 0 | 6 | 1 | 7 |
| 7 | (Democratic Republic of the Congo) DR Congo (COD) | 0 | 2 | 1 | 3 |
| 8 | Tunisia (TUN) | 0 | 1 | 3 | 4 |
| 9 | Nigeria (NGR) | 0 | 0 | 6 | 6 |
| 10 | Senegal (SEN) | 0 | 0 | 2 | 2 |
| 11 | Ghana (GHA) | 0 | 0 | 1 | 1 |
| 11 | Morocco (MAR) | 0 | 0 | 1 | 1 |
| Totals (12 entries) | | 24 | 24 | 24 | 72 |

== See also ==
- African Men's Handball Championship
- African Women's Handball Championship
