= Handball at the 2007 African Games – Women's tournament =

Handball tournament

Tournament details
- Host country: Algeria
- Venue: 1 (in 1 host city)
- Dates: July 14−21 2007
- Teams: 8 (from 1 confederation)

Final positions
- Champions: Angola (4th title)
- Runners-up: Congo
- Third place: Ivory Coast
- Fourth place: Cameroon

The 2007 edition of the Women's Handball Tournament of the African Games was the 7th, organized by the African Handball Confederation and played under the auspices of the International Handball Federation, the handball sport governing body. The tournament ran from July 14−21 2007 in Algiers, Algeria, contested by 8 national teams and won by Angola.

== Draw ==
| Group A | Group B |
|---|---|
| Algeria; Angola; Ivory Coast; Tunisia | Cameroon; Congo; Kenya; Nigeria |

== Preliminary round ==
=== Group A ===
14 Jul 2007
| 16:00 | Angola | 30 (15:16) 29 | Tunisia |
| 16:00 | Ivory Coast | 28 (13:11) 23 | Algeria |
15 Jul 2007
| 16:00 | Ivory Coast | 18 (08:09) 14 | Tunisia |
| 16:00 | Angola | 28 (12:07) 18 | Algeria |
17 Jul 2007
| 16:00 | Angola | 36 (15:12) 31 | Ivory Coast |
| 16:00 | Tunisia | 23 (08:10) 22 | Algeria |

| Team | Pld | W | D | L | GF | GA | GD | Pts | Qualification |
|---|---|---|---|---|---|---|---|---|---|
| Angola | 3 | 3 | 0 | 0 | 94 | 78 | +16 | 6 | Advance to semi-finals |
| Ivory Coast | 3 | 2 | 0 | 1 | 77 | 73 | +4 | 4 | Advance to semi-finals |
| Tunisia | 3 | 1 | 0 | 2 | 66 | 70 | −4 | 2 | Relegated to 5th place classification |
| Algeria | 3 | 0 | 0 | 3 | 63 | 79 | −16 | 0 | Relegated to 7th place classification |

=== Group B ===
14 Jul 2007
| 14:00 | Congo (Republic of the Congo) | 29 (12:12) 23 | Nigeria |
| 16:00 | Cameroon | 39 (14:08) 24 | Kenya |
15 Jul 2007
| 16:00 | Congo (Republic of the Congo) | 34 (19:10) 21 | Cameroon |
| 18:00 | Nigeria | 35 (12:04) 11 | Kenya |
17 Jul 2007
| 14:00 | Congo (Republic of the Congo) | 32 (18:11) 21 | Kenya |
| 14:00 | Cameroon | 28 (18:14) 24 | Nigeria |

| Team | Pld | W | D | L | GF | GA | GD | Pts | Qualification |
|---|---|---|---|---|---|---|---|---|---|
| Congo | 3 | 3 | 0 | 0 | 95 | 65 | +30 | 6 | Advance to semi-finals |
| Cameroon | 3 | 2 | 0 | 1 | 88 | 82 | +6 | 4 | Advance to semi-finals |
| Nigeria | 3 | 1 | 0 | 2 | 82 | 68 | +14 | 2 | Relegated to 5th place classification |
| Kenya | 3 | 0 | 0 | 3 | 56 | 106 | −50 | 0 | Relegated to 7th place classification |

== Knockout stage ==
7th place match

| Algeria | : | Kenya |

5th place match

| Nigeria | : | Tunisia |

Championship bracket

Semifinals
Thu 19 Jul 2007 − 14:00
Angola | 37
Cameroon | 21
Thu 19 Jul 2007 − 16:00
(Republic of the Congo) Congo | 32
Ivory Coast | 26

Final
Sat 21 Jul 2007 − 16:00
Angola | 35
(Republic of the Congo) Congo | 22
Third place
Fri 20 Jul 2007 − 14:00
Ivory Coast | 25
Cameroon | 24

== Final ranking ==
| Rank | Team | Record |
|---|---|---|
| Gold medal | Angola | 5–0 |
| Silver medal | Congo | 4–1 |
| Bronze medal | Ivory Coast | 3–2 |
| 4 | Cameroon | 2–3 |
| 5 | Tunisia | 2–2 |
| 6 | Nigeria | 1–3 |
| 7 | Algeria | 1–3 |
| 8 | Kenya | 0–4 |

== Awards ==
2003 All-Africa Games Women's Handball winner

Angola
4th title
