= Handball at the 1991 All-Africa Games =

Tournament details
- Host country: Egypt
- Dates: 24–30 September
- Teams: 7+6 (from 1 confederation)

Final positions
- Champions: Egypt (men); Angola (women)
- Runner-up: Algeria (men); Ivory Coast (women)
- Third place: Nigeria (men); Nigeria (women)

The handball events at the 1991 All-Africa Games were held in Cairo, Egypt from 24 to 30 September 1991. The competition included the men's tournament for the fifth time and the women's tournament for third time.

== Events ==
=== Men's tournament ===
Final standing is:

Rank	Team	Pts	Pld	W	D	L	GF	GA
Gold medal	Egypt	15	5	5	0	0	??	??
Silver medal	Algeria	13	5	4	0	1	98	72
Bronze medal	Nigeria	?	5	?	?	?	??	??
4	Cameroon	?	5	?	?	?	??	??
5	Senegal	?	5	?	?	?	??	??
6	Ethiopia	?	5	?	?	?	??	??
-	Madagascar	Withdraw						
-	Namibia	Withdraw						

=== Women's tournament ===
Final standing is:

Rank	Team
Gold medal	Angola
Silver medal	Ivory Coast
Bronze medal	Nigeria
4	Senegal
5	Cameroon
6	Egypt
