= Angola women's national handball team =

Angola

Information
- Nickname: As Pérolas The Pearls
- Association: Federação Angolana de Andebol
- Coach: Carlos Viver
- Assistant coach: Nelson Catito
- Captain: Albertina Kassoma
- Most caps: Luísa Kiala (110)

Colours
1st	2nd

Results

Summer Olympics
- Appearances: 8 (First in 1996)
- Best result: 7th (1996)

World Championship
- Appearances: 18 (First in 1990)
- Best result: 7th (2007)

African Championship
- Appearances: 23 (First in 1981)
- Best result: 1st (1989, 1992, 1994, 1998, 2000, 2002, 2004, 2006, 2008, 2010, 2012, 2016, 2018, 2021, 2022, 2024)
- Last updated on Unknown.

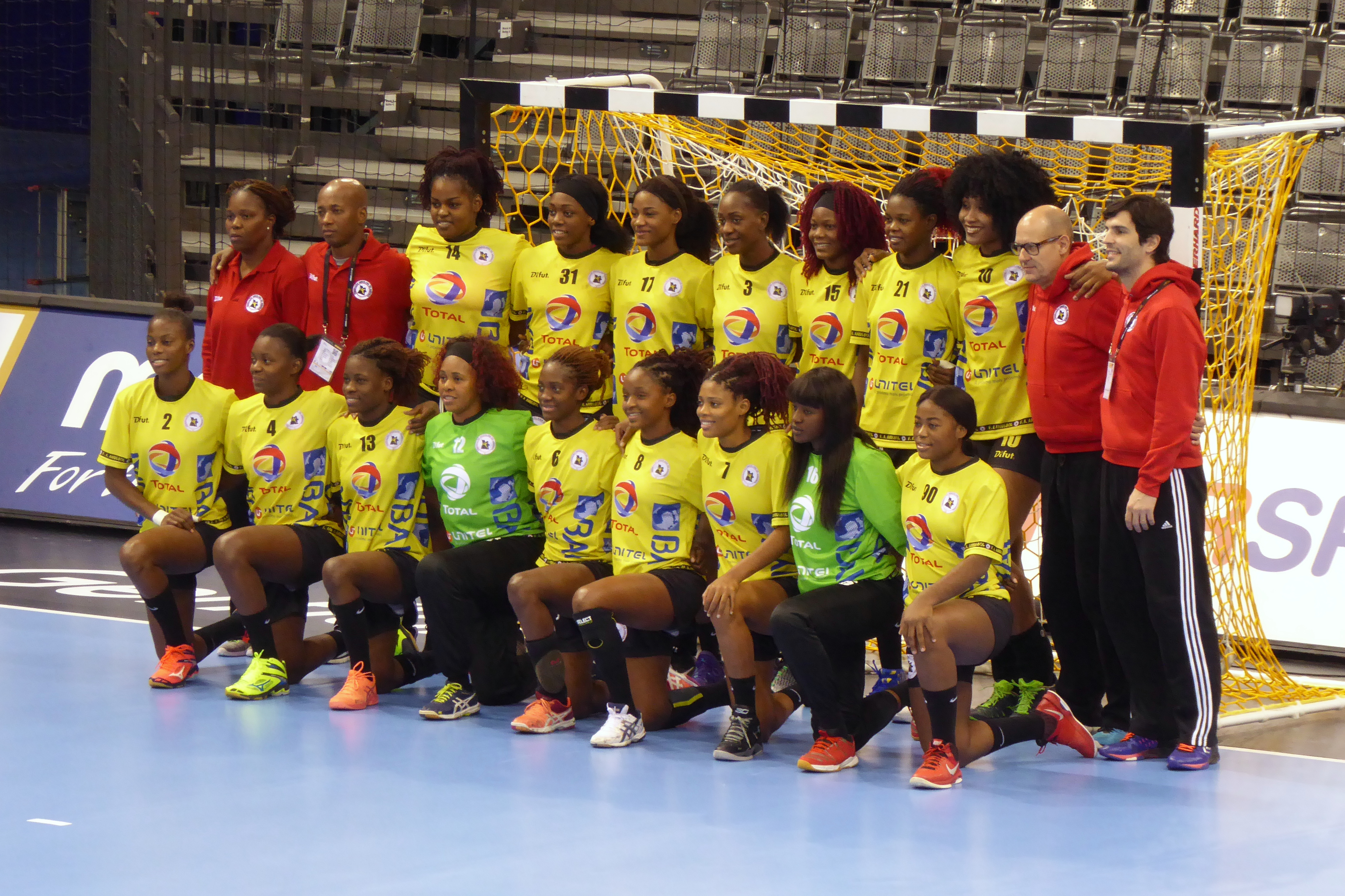

The Angola women's national handball team, nicknamed As Pérolas (The Pearls), represents Angola in international handball competitions. They are considered the strongest team in Africa with the most African championship and good performances are world championships.

== History ==
Angola became a member of the African Handball Confederation in 1980.

=== Summer Olympics ===
Angola participated in six editions of the olympic games since 1996, namely in 1996, 2000, 2004, 2008, 2012 and 2016, having ranked 7th in 1996.

=== World Championship ===
Angola participated in 14 editions of the world cup since 1990, namely in 1990, 1993, 1995, 1997, 1999, 2001, 2003, 2005, 2007, 2009, 2011, 2013, 2015 and 2017. It has notably ranked 7th in 2007 and 8th in 2011.

== Results ==
=== Summer Olympics ===
Year	Round	Position	GP	W	D*	L	GS	GA	GD
Montreal 1976	did not participate								
Moscow 1980	did not participate								
Los Angeles 1984	did not participate								
Seoul 1988	did not participate								
Barcelona 1992	did not participate								
Atlanta 1996	GS	7th/8	4	1	0	3	73	105	−32
Sydney 2000	GS	9th/10	5	1	0	4	124	155	−31
Athens 2004	GS	9th/10	5	1	1	3	135	154	−19
Beijing 2008	GS	12th/12	5	0	1	4	109	147	−38
London 2012	GS	10th/12	5	1	0	4	132	142	−10
Rio 2016	QF	8th/12	6	2	0	4	143	159	−16
Tokyo 2020	GS	10th/12	5	1	1	3	130	156	−26
Paris 2024	GS	9th/12	5	1	1	3	131	154	−23
Total	8/13	0 Titles	40	8	4	28	977	1172	−195

=== World Championship ===
Year	Eliminated at	Position	GP	W	D*	L	GS	GA	GD
Soviet Union 1975	did not participate								
Czechoslovakia 1978	did not participate								
Hungary 1982	did not participate								
Netherlands 1986	did not participate								
South Korea 1990	1/16	16th	6	0	0	6	93	155	−62
Norway 1993	1/16	1/16	6	0	0	6	103	164	−61
Austria/Hungary 1995	1/16	16th	7	1	0	6	137	198	−61
Germany 1997	1/16	15th	6	1	1	4	148	173	−25
Denmark/Norway 1999	1/16	15th	6	1	2	3	131	158	−27
Italy 2001	1/16	13th	6	2	0	4	144	146	−2
Croatia 2003	R1	17th	5	1	0	4	119	120	−1
Russia 2005	1/16	16th	5	2	0	3	167	140	+27
France 2007	QF	7th	10	6	0	4	326	307	+19
China 2009	1/16	11th	9	5	0	4	244	202	+42
Brazil 2011	QF	8th	9	4	0	5	242	259	−17
Serbia 2013	1/16	16th	6	2	0	4	156	152	+4
Denmark 2015	1/16	16th	6	2	0	4	172	193	−21
Germany 2017	Presidents Cup	19th	7	2	0	5	190	198	−8
Japan 2019	Presidents Cup	15th	7	3	0	4	197	206	−9
Spain 2021	Presidents Cup	25th	7	4	1	2	216	149	+67
Denmark/Norway/Sweden 2023	MR	15th	6	2	1	3	161	179	−18
Germany/Netherlands 2025	MR	10th	6	4	0	2	171	155	+16
Hungary 2027	To be determined								
Spain 2029	To be determined								
Czech Republic/Poland 2029	To be determined								
Total	18/25	0 Titles	120	42	5	73	3111	3254	−137

=== African Championship ===
Year	Reached	Position	GP	W	D*	L	GS	GA	GD
(Tunisia) 1974	did not participate								
(Algeria) 1976	did not participate								
(Republic of the Congo) 1979	did not participate								
(Tunisia) 1981	–	7th	3	0	0	3	36	66	−30
(Egypt) 1983	QF	6th	10	5	1	4	186	191	-5
(Angola) 1985	QF	5th	6	4	0	2	118	94	+24
(Morocco) 1987	QF	5th	4	2	1	1	91	69	+22
(Algeria) 1989	Final	1st	4	3	1	0	82	63	+19
(Egypt) 1991	Final	2nd	6	1	3	2	71	70	+1
(Ivory Coast) 1992	Final	1st	5	4	1	0	99	73	+26
(Tunisia) 1994	Final	1st	4	3	0	1	86	77	+9
(Benin) 1996	Final	3rd	5	3	0	2	135	118	+17
(South Africa) 1998	Final	1st	4	3	1	0	127	80	+47
(Algeria) 2000	Final	1st	5	5	0	0	136	101	+35
(Morocco) 2002	Final	1st	6	6	0	0	183	115	+68
(Egypt) Cairo 2004	Final	1st	5	4	0	1	159	118	+41
(Tunisia) Tunis/Radès 2006	Final	1st	5	4	1	0	177	112	+65
(Angola) three cities 2008	Final	1st	5	5	0	0	193	116	+77
(Morocco) Cairo/Suez 2010	Final	1st	6	5	1	0	169	132	+37
(Morocco) Salé 2012	Final	1st	7	7	0	0	231	142	+89
(Algeria) Algiers 2014	Semi-final	3rd	6	5	0	1	190	127	+63
(Angola) Luanda 2016	Final	1st	7	7	0	0	245	124	+121
(Republic of the Congo) Brazzaville 2018	Final	1st	7	7	0	0	240	121	+119
(Cameroon) Yaoundé 2021	Final	1st	5	5	0	0	149	96	+53
(Senegal) Dakar 2022	Final	1st	6	6	0	0	184	118	+66
(Democratic Republic of the Congo) Kinshasa 2024	Final	1st	8	8	0	0	285	140	+145
(Tunisia) Nabeul/Hammamet 2026	Qualified								
Total	24/27	16 titles	129	102	10	17	3572	2463	+1109

=== African Games ===
Year	Reached	Position	GP	W	D*	L	GS	GA	GD
(Algeria) Algiers 1978	did not participate								
(Kenya) Nairobi 1987	did not participate								
(Egypt) Cairo 1991	Final	1st	No data available						
(Zimbabwe) Harare 1995	Final	1st	5	5	0	0	118	83	+35
(South Africa) Jo'burg 1999	Final	1st	4	4	0	0	125	75	+50
(Nigeria) Abuja 2003	Final	3rd	5	4	0	1	160	105	+55
(Algeria) Algiers 2007	Final	1st	5	5	0	0	166	121	+45
(Mozambique) Maputo 2011	Final	1st	5	5	0	0	218	81	+137
(Republic of the Congo) Brazzaville 2015	Final	1st	5	5	0	0	173	98	+75
(Morocco) Rabat 2019	Final	1st	7	7	0	0	230	118	+112
(Ghana) Accra 2023	Final	1st	5	5	0	0	188	75	+113
Total	8/10	8 titles	31	23	0	1	1072	598	+474

=== Other competitions ===
- 2015 Angola 40 Years Tournament –
- 2019 Carpathian Trophy –

== Team ==
=== Current squad ===
Squad for the 2025 World Women's Handball Championship.

Head coach: Carlos Viver

No.	Pos.	Name	Date of birth (age)	Height	App.	Goals	Club
1	GK	Marta Alberto	10 February 1995 (age 31)	1.82 m	18	1	(Angola) Petro de Luanda
2	CB	Vilma Nenganga	12 September 1996 (age 30)	1.75 m	24	63	(Angola) Petro de Luanda
4	LW	Marcela Tati	12 December 2004 (age 21)	1.78 m	30	44	(Angola) Primeiro de Agosto
5	P	Liliane Mario	16 November 2004 (age 21)	1.77 m	31	62	(Slovenia) RK Krim
6	RB	Juliana Machado	6 November 1994 (age 32)	1.72 m	89	179	(Angola) Primeiro de Agosto
7	RW	Dolores Rosário	1 April 2003 (age 23)	1.76 m	25	53	(Angola) Primeiro de Agosto
8	CB	Helena Paulo	24 January 1998 (age 28)	1.73 m	63	208	(Romania) Târgu Jiu
9	LW	Natália Santos	25 December 1986 (age 39)	1.73 m	300	248	(Angola) Primeiro de Agosto
10	P	Albertina Kassoma	12 June 1996 (age 30)	1.85 m	104	302	(Romania) Rapid București
11	LW	Marília Quizelete	3 June 1997 (age 29)	1.73 m	38	64	(Angola) Petro de Luanda
12	GK	Cristina Miguel	7 August 2003 (age 23)	1.73 m	15	0	(Angola) Primeiro de Agosto
15	LB	Rossana Mateus	11 September 2000 (age 26)	1.84 m	0	0	(Angola) Primeiro de Agosto
25	P	Liliane Venancio	19 September 1995 (age 31)	1.91 m	55	74	(Romania) HC Dunărea Brăila
30	GK	Eliane Paulo	9 March 1999 (age 27)	1.81 m	12	0	(Angola) Primeiro de Agosto
35	RB	Azenaide Carlos	14 June 1990 (age 36)	1.73 m	113	174	(Serbia) ŽRK Crvena zvezda
77	LB	Bernadeth Belo	2 January 2004 (age 22)	1.82 m	37	121	(Angola) Primeiro de Agosto
88	RW	Balbina Nunda	29 October 2006 (age 20)	1.73 m	9	49	(Angola) Primeiro de Agosto
90	CB	Isabel Guialo	8 April 1990 (age 36)	1.70 m	101	324	(Angola) Primeiro de Agosto

== Angola all-time record against all nations ==
Against	Pld	Wn	Dr	Lst	GF	GA	GD	Details
Algeria	16	14	0	2	453	267	+186	Extended content 34–15 2024 AC QF (4 Dec 2024) Kinshasa 38–18 2024 AG PR (18 Mar 2024) Accra 29–17 2022 AC PR (10 Nov 2022) Dakar 41–17 2018 AC QF (9 Dec 2018) Brazzaville 42–19 2016 AC QF (4 Dec 2016) Luanda 30–22 2014 AC 3P (25 Jan 2014) Algiers 32–18 2011 AG SF (15 Sep 2011) Maputo 42–24 2008 AC PR (8 Jan 2008) Luanda 28–18 2007 AG PL (15 Jul 2007) Algiers 30–16 2003 AG PL (5 Oct 2003) Abuja 33–21 2002 AC SF (26 Apr 2002) Rabat 24–14 1999 AG SF (16 Sep 1999) Jo'burg 18–19 1981 AC PR (9 Nov 1994) Tunis 00–00 1991 AC RR (10 Nov 1990) Cairo 19–09 1989 AC SF (25 Jul 1989) Algiers 13–20 1981 AC PR (22 Jul 1981) Tunis
Argentina	3	3	0	0	100	63	+37	Extended content 30–27 2019 WC CL (9 Dec 2019) Higashi-ku 33–23 2013 WC PR (7 Dec 2013) Zrenjanin 37–13 1999 WC PR (4 Dec 1999) Kolding
Australia	3	3	0	0	112	35	+77	Extended content 39–09 2009 WC PR (5 Dec 2009) Zhangjiagang 47–08 2005 WC PR (9 Dec 2005) St Petersburg 26–18 2000 OG 9P (28 Sep 2000) Sydney
Austria	5	2	0	3	125	133	–8	Extended content 30–25 2023 WC CL (8 Dec 2023) Trondheim 21–28 2009 WC PR (7 Dec 2009) Zhangjiagang 33–22 2007 WC PR (3 Dec 2007) Lyon 19–29 2003 WC PR (2 Dec 2003) Poreč 22–29 1997 WC PR (4 Dec 1997) Sindelfingen
Czech Republic	1	0	0	1	18	24	−6	Extended content 18–24 2003 WC PR (6 Dec 2003) Poreč
Brazil	4	1	0	3	99	110	-11	Extended content 19–30 2024 OG PR (3 Aug 2024) Paris 24–28 2016 OG PR (10 Aug 2016) Rio 26–29 2012 OG PR (5 Aug 2012) London 30–23 1997 WC PR (7 Dec 1997) Sindelfingen
Cameroon	19	14	0	5	514	419	+95	Extended content 29–19 2024 AC PR (1 Dec 2024) Kinshasa 35–16 2023 AG SF (20 Mar 2024) Accra 27–21 2024 OG QL (14 Oct 2023) Luanda 29–19 2022 AC F (19 Nov 2022) Dakar 35–24 2021 WC CL (9 Dec 2021) Llíria 25–15 2021 AC F (18 Jun 2021) Yaoundé 28–25 2019 AG F (29 Aug 2019) Casablanca 25–16 2018 AC SF (10 Dec 2018) Brazzaville 33–23 2017 WC CL (11 Dec 2017) Leipzig 31–19 2016 AC SF (5 Dec 2016) Luanda 30–14 2016 AC PR (30 Nov 2016) Luanda 33–29 2015 AG F (19 Sep 2015) Brazzaville 28–23 2014 AC QF (22 Jan 2014) Algiers 24–18 2012 AC PR (13 Jan 2012) Salé 30–17 2010 AC QF (15 Feb 2010) Cairo 37–21 2007 AG SF (19 Jul 2007) Algiers 31–20 2004 AC F (18 Apr 2004) Cairo 27–28 2004 AC PR (9 Apr 2004) Cairo 27–28 2003 AG SF (12 Oct 2003) Abuja 26–21 2000 AC SF (29 Apr 2000) Algiers 26–21 1998 AC SF (26 Oct 1998) Jo'burg 28–23 1996 AC PR (— Oct 1996) Cotonou 20–20 1987 AC PR (8 Jul 1987) Rabat 20–28 1983 AC QL (9 Apr 1983) Dakar 17–27 1983 AC QL (5 Apr 1983) Dakar 13–18 1981 CAG PR (23 Aug 1981) Luanda
Cape Verde	2	2	0	0	77	29	+48	Extended content 38–15 2022 AC PR (13 Nov 2022) Dakar 39–14 2021 AC PR (9 Jun 2021) Yaoundé
Canada	1	0	0	1	21	25	−4	Extended content 21–25 1990 WC CL (2 Dec 1990) Seoul
China	6	3	0	3	158	184	–26	Extended content 32–29 2015 WC PR (11 Dec 2015) Næstved 30–29 2011 WC PR (3 Dec 2011) Santos 26–25 2009 WC 11P (17 Dec 2009) Suzhou 24–32 2008 OG PR (13 Aug 2008) Beijing 20–34 1995 WC PR (9 Dec 1995) Győr 26–35 1993 WC CL (3 Dec 1993) Norway
Congo	18	14	1	4	523	413	+110	Extended content 32–19 2018 AC PR (7 Dec 2018) Brazzaville 33–18 2014 AC PR (16 Jan 2014) Algiers 41–23 2011 AG F (17 Sep 2011) Maputo 25–25 2010 AC PR (13 Feb 2010) Suez 35–30 2008 AC PR (11 Jan 2008) Benguela 35–22 2007 AG F (21 Jul 2007) Algiers 35–27 2003 AG 3P (13 Oct 2003) Abuja 31–20 2002 AC PR (24 Apr 2002) Rabat 27–13 2001 WC PR (6 Dec 2001) Kolding 30–21 2000 AC F (1 May 2000) Algiers 29–19 1999 AG F (18 Sep 1999) Jo'burg 34–24 1999 AG PL (11 Sep 1999) Jo'burg 31–23 1998 AC F (28 Oct 1998) Jo'burg 24–21 1996 AC 3P (— Oct 1996) Cotonou 24–26 1996 AC PR (— Oct 1996) Cotonou 22–21 1995 AG F (— – 1995) Harare 15–21 1985 AC PR (19 Sep 1985) Luanda 12–22 1983 AC PR (23 Jul 1983) Cairo 08–18 1981 CAG PR (25 Aug 1981) Luanda
Croatia	5	1	0	4	131	142	−11	Extended content 23–28 2012 OG PR (30 Jul 2012) London 29–32 2011 WC 7P (18 Dec 2011) São Paulo 34–28 2007 WC PR (8 Dec 2007) Metz 22–30 1997 WC R16 (9 Dec 1997) Saarbrücken 23–24 1995 WC CL (14 Dec 1995) Győr
Cuba	2	2	0	0	78	53	+25	Extended content 40–30 2019 WC PR (6 Dec 2019) Minami-ku 38–23 2015 WC PR (8 Dec 2015) Næstved
Denmark	6	1	0	5	110	172	−62	Extended content 23–28 2011 WC QF (14 Dec 2011) São Paulo 28–23 2009 WC PR (13 Dec 2009) Yangzhou 22–38 2004 OG PR (21 Aug 2004) Athens 18–30 2001 WC R16 (11 Dec 2001) Bolzano 12–31 1999 WC PR (30 Nov 1999) Kolding 07–22 1990 WC PR (27 Nov 1990) Seoul
Dominican Republic	1	1	0	0	41	20	+21	Extended content 41–20 2007 WC PR (4 Dec 2007) Lyon
DR Congo	13	13	0	0	443	251	+192	Extended content 29–21 2020 OG QL (26 Sep 2019) Dakar 27–21 2019 AG PR (25 Aug 2019) Casablanca 33–24 2018 AC PR (2 Dec 2018) Brazzaville 38–19 2016 AC PR (2 Dec 2016) Luanda 29–22 2015 AG QF (16 Sep 2015) Brazzaville 36–28 2016 OG QL (20 Mar 2015) Luanda 39–19 2012 AC SF (19 Jan 2012) Salé 40–15 2012 AC PR (15 Jan 2012) Salé 41–17 2011 AG PL (10 Sep 2011) Maputo 24–15 2010 AC PR (12 Feb 2010) Suez 40–21 2006 AC PR (12 Jan 2006) Radès 32–17 2004 AC PR (12 Apr 2004) Cairo 35–12 2003 AG PL (7 Oct 2003) Abuja
East Germany	1	0	0	1	16	28	−12	Extended content 16–28 1990 WC PR (24 Nov 1990) Seoul
Egypt	5	5	0	0	144	102	+42	Extended content 36–23 2012 AC PR (16 Jan 2012) Salé 32–21 2010 AC PR (11 Feb 2010) Suez 38–25 2004 AC PR (13 Apr 2004) Cairo 18–14 1985 AC PR (14 Sep 1985) Luanda 20–19 1983 AC PR (28 Jul 1983) Cairo
France	8	1	0	7	178	260	–82	Extended content 17–28 2019 WC CL (8 Dec 2019) Minami-ku 19–26 2017 WC PR (2 Dec 2017) Trier 24–33 2009 WC PR (12 Dec 2009) Yangzhou 21–32 2008 OG PR (9 Aug 2008) Beijing 29–27 2007 WC PR (6 Dec 2007) Metz 21–29 2004 OG PR (21 Aug 2004) Athens 27–29 2000 OG PR (23 Sep 2000) Sydney 20–24 1990 WC CL (29 Nov 1990) Seoul
Gabon	5	5	0	0	182	75	+107	Extended content 33–09 2008 AC PR (11 Jan 2008) Benguela 55–12 2006 AC PR (11 Jan 2006) Radès 36–16 2002 AC PR (19 Apr 2002) Rabat 32–23 1983 AC QL (8 Apr 1983) Dakar 26–15 1983 AC QL (4 Apr 1983) Dakar
Germany	8	1	1	6	179	251	–72	Extended content 21–29 2013 WC R16 (11 Dec 2013) Novi Sad 25–22 2011 WC PR (9 Dec 2011) Santos 21–25 2009 WC PR (15 Dec 2009) Yangzhou 33–36 2007 WC QF (13 Dec 2007) Paris 20–20 1999 WC PR (1 Dec 1999) Kolding 20–32 1997 WC PR (3 Dec 1997) Sindelfingen 12–27 1996 OG PR (30 Jul 1996) Atlanta 19–30 1995 WC PR (5 Dec 1995) Győr 08–30 1993 WC PR (26 Nov 1993) Norway
Ghana	2	2	0	0	85	19	+66	Extended content 55–07 2011 AG PL (9 Sep 2011) Maputo 30–12 1985 AC 5P (22 Sep 1985) Luanda
Great Britain	1	1	0	0	31	25	+6	Extended content 31–25 2012 OG PR (3 Aug 2012) London
Greece	1	1	0	0	38	23	+15	Extended content 38–23 2004 OG 9P (26 Aug 2004) Athens
Guinea	4	4	0	0	145	64	+81	Extended content 31–14 2019 AG SF (28 Aug 2019) Casablanca 30–19 2019 AG PR (20 Aug 2019) Casablanca 40–17 2018 AC PR (2 Dec 2018) Brazzaville 44–14 2014 AC PR (18 Jan 2014) Algiers
Hungary	5	1	0	4	130	174	−44	Extended content 37–36 2007 WC 7P (16 Dec 2007) Paris 30–34 2005 WC PR (6 Dec 2005) St Petersburg 23–24 2001 WC PR (4 Dec 2001) Kolding 22–42 2000 OG PR (17 Sep 2000) Sydney 18–38 1999 WC R16 (7 Dec 1999) Gjøvik
Iceland	1	1	0	0	28	24	+4	Extended content 28–24 2011 WC PR (4 Dec 2011) Santos
Ivory Coast	14	11	1	3	397	337	+60	Extended content 37–18 2016 AC PR (28 Nov 2016) Luanda 25–23 2012 AC PR (12 Jan 2012) Salé 27–24 2010 AC SF (18 Feb 2010) Cairo 39–27 2008 AC F (28 Apr 2008) Luanda 36–31 2007 AG PL (17 Jul 2007) Algiers 29–28 2006 AC SF (18 Jan 2006) Radès 33–23 2003 AG PL (9 Oct 2003) Abuja 30–21 2002 AC F (28 Apr 2002) Rabat 26–16 2002 AC PR (21 Apr 2002) Rabat 20–18 2000 AC PR (27 Apr 2000) Algiers 17–17 1998 AC PR (— Oct 1998) Jo'burg 25–29 1996 AC SF (— Oct 1996) Cotonou 23–19 1991 AG F (— – 1991) Cairo 17–24 1985 AC PR (17 Sep 1985) Luanda 13–19 1983 AC PR (24 Jul 1983) Cairo
Japan	2	0	2	0	52	52	0	Extended content 22–22 1999 WC PR (2 Dec 1999) Kolding 30–30 1997 WC PR (6 Dec 1997) Sindelfingen
Kazakhstan	1	0	1	0	24	24	0	Extended content 24–24 2008 OG PR (17 Aug 2008) Beijing
Kenya	1	1	0	0	42	12	+30	Extended content 42–12 2015 AG PL (10 Sep 2015) Brazzaville
Lithuania	1	0	0	1	19	26	–7	Extended content 19–26 1993 WC CL (1 Dec 1993) Norway
North Macedonia	2	1	0	1	55	59	−4	Extended content 33–25 2007 WC PR (9 Dec 2007) Metz 22–34 1999 WC PR (5 Dec 1999) Kolding
Morocco	2	2	0	0	95	22	+73	Extended content 45–11 2019 AG PR (22 Aug 2019) Casablanca 45–11 2018 AC PR (2 Dec 2018) Brazzaville
Montenegro	4	1	0	3	106	121	−15	Extended content 27–25 2016 OG PR (8 Aug 2016) Rio 28–38 2015 WC R16 (14 Dec 2015) Herning 25–30 2012 OG PR (1 Aug 2012) London 26–28 2011 WC PR (6 Dec 2011) Santos
Mozambique	2	2	0	0	87	38	+49	Extended content 53–19 1998 AC PR (19 Oct 1998) Jo'burg 34–19 1996 AC PR (— Oct 1996) Cotonou
Netherlands	2	0	0	2	52	72	−20	Extended content 28–35 2019 WC PR (2 Dec 2019) Minami-ku 24–37 2015 WC PR (6 Dec 2015) Næstved
Nigeria	5	4	0	1	164	96	+68	Extended content 33–16 2019 AG PR (21 Aug 2019) Casablanca 32–10 2015 AG SF (18 Sep 2015) Brazzaville 37–25 2015 AG PL (14 Sep 2015) Brazzaville 49–16 2011 AG QF (14 Sep 2011) Maputo 13–29 1981 AC PR (25 Jul 1981) Tunis
Norway	8	0	0	8	176	241	–65	Extended content 24–30 2019 WC PR (5 Dec 2019) Minami-ku 20–30 2016 OG PR (10 Aug 2016) Rio 21–26 2013 WC PR (12 Dec 2013) Zrenjanin 20–26 2011 WC PR (7 Dec 2011) Santos 17–31 2008 OG PR (11 Aug 2008) Beijing 26–32 2007 WC PR (2 Dec 2007) Lyon 30–36 2005 WC PR (5 Dec 2005) St Petersburg 18–30 1996 OG PR (26 Jul 1996) Atlanta
Paraguay	2	2	0	0	69	40	+29	Extended content 32–28 2017 WC PR (2 Dec 2017) Trier 37–12 2013 WC PR (9 Dec 2013) Zrenjanin
Poland	4	0	0	4	107	124	–17	Extended content 33–34 2017 WC CL (10 Dec 2017) Leipzig 27–29 2015 WC PR (9 Dec 2015) Næstved 23–32 2013 WC PR (9 Dec 2013) Zrenjanin 24–29 1997 WC PR (2 Dec 1997) Sindelfingen
Romania	6	1	0	5	138	163	–25	Extended content 24–27 2017 WC PR (2 Dec 2017) Trier 23–19 2016 OG PR (6 Aug 2016) Rio 23–28 2008 OG PR (15 Aug 2008) Beijing 27–28 2001 WC PR (5 Dec 2001) Kolding 25–35 2000 OG PR (21 Sep 2000) Sydney 16–26 1993 WC PR (24 Nov 1993) Norway
Russia	7	0	0	7	172	217	−45	Extended content 27–31 2016 OG QF (16 Aug 2016) Rio 27–30 2012 OG PR (28 Jul 2012) London 31–41 2011 WC CL (16 Dec 2011) São Paulo 21–23 2009 WC PR (9 Dec 2009) Zhangjiagang 27–40 2007 WC PR (11 Dec 2007) Metz 22–26 2003 WC PR (3 Dec 2003) Poreč 17–26 1995 WC PR (6 Dec 1995) Győr
Senegal	9	9	0	0	249	154	+95	Extended content 22–14 2020 OG QL (29 Sep 2019) Dakar 19–14 2018 AC F (12 Dec 2018) Brazzaville 31–18 2016 AC PR (29 Nov 2016) Luanda 38–21 2016 OG QL (19 Mar 2015) Luanda 41–20 2012 AC QF (18 Jan 2012) Salé 30–19 2000 AC PR (25 Apr 2000) Algiers 22–10 1985 AC 5P (23 Sep 1985) Luanda 25–24 1983 AC QL (7 Apr 1983) Dakar 21–14 1983 AC QL (2 Apr 1983) Dakar
Serbia	1	0	0	1	25	32	-7	Extended content 25–32 2019 WC PR 30 Nov 2019) Minami-ku
Slovenia	3	2	0	1	86	83	+1	Extended content 33–24 2019 WC PR (3 Dec 2019) Minami-ku 25–32 2017 WC PR (2 Dec 2017) Trier 28–27 2005 WC PR (10 Dec 2005) St Petersburg
South Africa	1	1	0	0	38	18	+20	Extended content 38–18 1999 AG PL (13 Sep 1999) Jo'burg
South Korea	9	1	0	8	223	289	−66	Extended content 30–29 2011 WC R16 (11 Dec 2011) Santos 33–41 2007 WC CL (15 Dec 2007) Paris 32–35 2005 WC PR (6 Dec 2005) St Petersburg 30–40 2004 OG PR (19 Aug 2004) Athens 21–27 2003 WC PR (4 Dec 2003) Poreč 24–31 2000 OG PR (25 Sep 2000) Sydney 19–25 1996 OG PR (28 Jul 1996) Atlanta 14–27 1995 WC R16 (12 Dec 1995) Győr 20–34 1995 WC PR (8 Dec 1995) Győr
Soviet Union	1	0	0	1	15	28	−13	Extended content 15–28 1990 WC PR (25 Nov 1990) Seoul
Spain	6	0	1	5	134	158	–24	Extended content 24–28 2017 WC PR (2 Dec 2017) Trier 22–26 2016 OG PR (14 Aug 2016) Rio 21–30 2013 WC PR (12 Dec 2013) Zrenjanin 24–24 2004 OG PR (15 Aug 2004) Athens 28–29 2001 WC PR (8 Dec 2001) Kolding 15–21 1993 WC CL (30 Nov 1993) Norway
Sweden	3	0	0	3	56	91	–35	Extended content 23–37 2015 WC PR (5 Dec 2015) Næstved 19–26 1993 WC PR (27 Nov 1993) Norway 14–28 1990 WC CL (1 Dec 1990) Seoul
Thailand	1	1	0	0	36	16	+20	Extended content 36–16 2009 WC PR (9 Dec 2009) Zhangjiagang
Tunisia	15	12	1	2	415	351	+64	Extended content 36–17 2016 AC F (7 Dec 2016) Luanda 26–23 2016 OG QL (21 Mar 2015) Luanda 30–31 2014 AC SF (24 Jan 2014) Algiers 25–19 2014 AC PR (21 Jan 2014) Algiers 26–24 2012 AC F (20 Jan 2012) Salé 31–30 2010 AC F (20 Feb 2010) Cairo 44–26 2008 AC SF (15 Jan 2008) Luanda 30–29 2007 AG PL (14 Jul 2007) Algiers 32–30 2006 AC F (20 Jan 2006) Radès 21–21 2006 AC PR (16 Jan 2006) Radès 31–28 2004 AC SF (16 Apr 2004) Cairo 27–21 2002 AC PR (23 Apr 2002) Rabat 30–22 2000 AC PR (23 Apr 2000) Algiers 16–13 1985 AC 5P (21 Sep 1985) Luanda 10–17 1981 AC PR (17 Jul 1981) Tunis
Uganda	1	0	0	1	36	12	+24	Extended content 36–24 2019 AG QF (26 Aug 2019) Casablanca
Ukraine	1	1	0	0	28	20	+8	Extended content 28–20 2009 WC PR (6 Dec 2009) Zhangjiagang
Uruguay	1	1	0	0	39	14	+25	Extended content 39–14 2003 WC PR (7 Dec 2003) Poreč
United States	2	2	0	0	48	46	+2	Extended content 24–23 1996 OG 7P (1 Aug 1996) Atlanta 24–23 1995 WC CL (11 Dec 1995) Győr

== See also ==
- Angola women's junior national handball team
- Angola women's youth national handball team
