= Handball at the 2003 All-Africa Games – Women's tournament =

Tournament details
- Host country: Nigeria
- Venue: 1 (in 1 host city)
- Teams: 8 (from 1 confederation)

Final positions
- Champions: Cameroon (1st title)
- Runners-up: Ivory Coast
- Third place: Angola
- Fourth place: Congo

The 2003 edition of the Women's Handball Tournament of the African Games was the 6th, organized by the African Handball Confederation and played under the auspices of the International Handball Federation, the handball sport governing body. The tournament was held in Abuja, Nigeria, contested by 8 national teams and won by Cameroon.

== Draw ==
Group A	Group B
Cameroon; Congo; Kenya; Nigeria	Angola; Algeria; DR Congo; Ivory Coast

== Preliminary round ==
=== Group A ===
05 Oct 2003
14:00	Congo (Republic of the Congo)	41 : 19	Kenya
18:00	Cameroon	33 : 26	Nigeria
07 Oct 2003
14:00	Nigeria	35 : 14	Kenya
18:00	Congo (Republic of the Congo)	36 : 34	Cameroon
09 Oct 2003
14:00	Cameroon	39 : 16	Kenya
20:00	Congo (Republic of the Congo)	25 : 18	Nigeria

Team	Pld	W	D	L	GF	GA	GD	Pts	Qualification
Congo	3	3	0	0	102	71	+31	6	Advance to semi-finals
Cameroon	3	2	0	1	106	78	+28	4	Advance to semi-finals
Nigeria	3	1	0	2	79	72	+7	2	Relegated to 5th place classification
Kenya	3	0	0	3	49	115	−66	0	Relegated to 7th place classification

=== Group B ===
05 Oct 2003
14:00	Ivory Coast	38 : 12	(Democratic Republic of the Congo) DR Congo
18:00	Angola	30 : 16	Algeria
07 Oct 2003
14:00	Angola	35 : 12	(Democratic Republic of the Congo) DR Congo
18:00	Ivory Coast	29 : 17	Algeria
09 Oct 2003
14:00	Algeria	38 : 21	(Democratic Republic of the Congo) DR Congo
20:00	Angola	33 : 23	Ivory Coast

Team	Pld	W	D	L	GF	GA	GD	Pts	Qualification
Angola	3	3	0	0	98	51	+47	6	Advance to semi-finals
Ivory Coast	3	2	0	1	87	70	+17	4	Advance to semi-finals
Algeria	3	1	0	2	71	80	−9	2	Relegated to 5th place classification
DR Congo	3	0	0	3	53	108	−55	0	Relegated to 7th place classification

== Knockout stage ==
7th place match

11 Oct 2003
14:00	DR Congo (Democratic Republic of the Congo)	26 : 20	Kenya

5th place match

11 Oct 2003
18:00	Nigeria	25 : 21	Algeria

Championship bracket

Semifinals
Sun 12 Oct 2003 − 14:00
Cameroon	28
Angola	27
Sun 12 Oct 2003 − 18:00
Ivory Coast	23
(Republic of the Congo) Congo	20

Final
Mon 13 Oct 2003 − 18:00
Cameroon	28
Ivory Coast	27
Third place
Mon 13 Oct 2003 − 14:00
Angola	35
(Republic of the Congo) Congo	27

== Final ranking ==
Rank	Team	Record
Gold medal	Cameroon	4–1
Silver medal	Ivory Coast	3–2
Bronze medal	Angola	4–1
4	Congo	3-2
5	Nigeria	2–2
6	Algeria	1–3
7	DR Congo	1–3
8	Kenya	0–4

== Awards ==
2003 All-Africa Games Women's Handball winner

Cameroon
1st title
