= Handball at the 1987 All-Africa Games =

Tournament details
- Host country: Kenya
- Dates: 1–13 August
- Teams: 7 (men). 6+ (women) (from 1 confederation)

Final positions
- Champions: Algeria (men); Ivory Coast (women)
- Runner-up: Congo (men); Congo (women)
- Third place: Egypt (men); Cameroon (women)

Handball at the 1987 All-Africa Games was held from August 1–13, 1987 in Nairobi, Kenya. The competition included the men's tournament for the fourth time and the women's tournament for second time.

== Events ==
=== Men's tournament ===
Final standing is:

Rank	Team
Gold medal	Algeria
Silver medal	Congo
Bronze medal	Egypt
4	Cameroon
5 to 7	Madagascar
5 to 7	Senegal
5 to 7	Kenya
-	Mozambique (DNS)

=== Women's tournament ===
Final standing is:

Rank	Team
Gold medal	Ivory Coast
Silver medal	Congo
Bronze medal	Cameroon
4	Senegal
5	Algeria
6	Kenya
7	
