= Handball at the 1978 All-Africa Games – Men's tournament =

Handball at the 1978 All-Africa Games
Tournament details
- Host country: Algeria
- Venue: 1 (in 1 host city)
- Dates: July 1978
- Teams: 7

Final positions
- Champions: Algeria (2nd title)
- Runners-up: Tunisia
- Third place: Cameroon
- Fourth place: Madagascar

Tournament statistics
- Matches played: 23
- Goals scored: 736 (32 per match)

The Handball events at the 1978 All-Africa Games were held in Algiers, Algeria in July 1978. The competition included for the first time the women's event.

Egypt delegation protest and withdraw from the tournament and all the games due to the incident football match between Libya and Egypt in the football tournament.

== Qualified teams ==
Zone	Team
Hosts	Algeria
Zone I	Tunisia
Zone II	Senegal
Zone III	Ivory Coast (withdraw)
Zone IV	Benin
Zone V	Egypt
Zone VI	Cameroon
Zone VII	Madagascar

== Group stage ==
All times are local (UTC+1).

Team advance to the knockout stage

=== Group A ===
Team	Pld	W	D	L	GF	GA	GD	Pts
Algeria	2	2	0	0	48	31	+17	4
Cameroon	2	1	0	1	37	41	−4	2
Senegal	2	0	0	2	31	44	−13	0
Ivory Coast (withdraw)	0	0	0	0	0	0	0	0

... July 1978	Algeria	23–15	Senegal	Hacène Harcha Arena, Algiers

... July 1978	Cameroon	21–16	Senegal	Hacène Harcha Arena, Algiers

... July 1978	Algeria	25–16	Cameroon	Hacène Harcha Arena, Algiers

=== Group B ===
Madagascar progressed after Egypt withdrawal.

Team	Pld	W	D	L	GF	GA	GD	Pts
Tunisia	3	3	0	0	79	49	+30	6
Egypt (withdraw)	3	2	0	1	46	30	+16	4
Madagascar	3	1	0	2	36	43	−7	2
Benin	3	0	0	3	43	82	−39	0

... July 1978	Madagascar	18–16	Benin	Algiers

... July 1978	Tunisia	18–16	Egypt	Algiers

... July 1978	Egypt	34–12	Benin	Algiers

... July 1978	Tunisia	31–18	Madagascar	Algiers

... July 1978	Tunisia	30–15	Benin	Algiers

... July 1978	Egypt	–	Cameroon	Algiers

== Knockout stage ==
Semifinals
.. July – Algiers
Algeria	28
Madagascar	14
.. July – Algiers
Tunisia	21
Cameroon	18

Final
.. July – Algiers
Algeria	20
Tunisia	13
Third place
.. July – Algiers
Madagascar	20
Cameroon	36

=== Semifinals ===
... July 1978	Algeria	28–14	Madagascar	Hacène Harcha Arena, Algiers

... July 1978	Tunisia	21–18	Cameroon	Hacène Harcha Arena, Algiers

=== Third place match ===
... July 1978	Madagascar	20–36	Cameroon	Hacène Harcha Arena, Algiers

=== Final ===
... July 1978	Algeria	20–13	Tunisia	Hacène Harcha Arena, Algiers

== Final standing ==
Pos	Team	Pld	W	D	L	Pts
Gold medal	Algeria	4	4	0	0	8
Silver medal	Tunisia	5	4	0	1	8
Bronze medal	Cameroon	4	2	0	2	4
4	Madagascar	5	1	0	4	2
5	Senegal	2	0	0	2	0
6	Benin	3	0	0	3	0
7	Egypt (W)	3	2	0	1	4

(W) Withdrew
