= Handball at the 1991 All-Africa Games – Women's tournament =

Tournament details
- Host country: Egypt
- Venue(s): 1 (in 1 host city)
- Teams: 6 (from 1 confederation)

Final positions
- Champions: Angola (1st title)
- Runners-up: Ivory Coast
- Third place: Nigeria
- Fourth place: Senegal

The 1991 edition of the Women's Handball Tournament of the African Games was the 3rd, organized by the African Handball Confederation and played under the auspices of the International Handball Federation, the handball sport governing body. The tournament was held, in Cairo, Egypt, contested by 6 national teams and won by Angola.

== Draw ==
Group A	Group B
Congo; Kenya; Madagascar; Tanzania	Algeria; Ivory Coast; Mozambique; Senegal

== Knockout stage ==
Championship bracket

Semifinals
Angola
Ivory Coast

Final
Angola	23
Ivory Coast	19
Third place
Nigeria	31
Senegal

== Final ranking ==
Rank	Team
Gold medal	Angola
Silver medal	Ivory Coast
Bronze medal	Nigeria
4	Senegal
5	Cameroon
6	Egypt

== Awards ==
1991 All-Africa Games Women's Handball winner

Angola
1st title
