= Handball at the 1999 All-Africa Games – Women's tournament =

Tournament details
- Host country: South Africa
- Venue(s): 1 (in 1 host city)
- Teams: 7 (from 1 confederation)

Final positions
- Champions: Angola (3rd title)
- Runners-up: Congo
- Third place: Cameroon
- Fourth place: Algeria

The 1999 edition of the Women's Handball Tournament of the African Games was the 5th, organized by the African Handball Confederation and played under the auspices of the International Handball Federation, the handball sport governing body. The tournament was held in Johannesburg, South Africa, contested by 7 national teams and won by Angola.

== Draw ==
| Group A | Group B |
|---|---|
| Angola; Congo; South Africa | Algeria; Cameroon; Ivory Coast; Senegal |

== Preliminary round ==
=== Group A ===
9 Sep 1999
| 17:00 | Congo (Republic of the Congo) | 46 : 14 | South Africa |
11 Sep 1999
| 10:00 | Angola | 34 : 24 | (Republic of the Congo) Congo |
13 Sep 1999
| 17:00 | Angola | 38 : 18 | South Africa |

| Team | Pld | W | D | L | GF | GA | GD | Pts | Qualification |
|---|---|---|---|---|---|---|---|---|---|
| Angola | 2 | 2 | 0 | 0 | 72 | 42 | +30 | 4 | Advance to semi-finals |
| Congo | 2 | 1 | 0 | 1 | 70 | 48 | +22 | 2 | Advance to semi-finals |
| South Africa | 2 | 0 | 0 | 2 | 32 | 84 | −52 | 0 | Relegated to 5th place classification |

=== Group B ===
09 Sep 1999
| 10:00 | Algeria | 12 : 04 | Ivory Coast |
| 15:00 | Cameroon | 13 : 10 | Senegal |
12 Sep 1999
| 10:00 | Cameroon | 19 : 16 | Algeria |
| 19:00 | Ivory Coast | 35 : 22 | Senegal |
14 Sep 1999
| 17:00 | Algeria | 30 : 19 | Senegal |
| 19:00 | Cameroon | 20 : 20 | Ivory Coast |

| Team | Pld | W | D | L | GF | GA | GD | Pts | Qualification |
|---|---|---|---|---|---|---|---|---|---|
| Cameroon | 3 | 2 | 1 | 0 | 73 | 55 | +18 | 5 | Advance to semi-finals |
| Algeria | 3 | 2 | 0 | 1 | 68 | 57 | +11 | 4 | Advance to semi-finals |
| Ivory Coast | 3 | 1 | 1 | 1 | 74 | 64 | +10 | 3 | Relegated to 5th place classification |
| Senegal | 3 | 0 | 0 | 3 | 60 | 99 | −39 | 0 | Relegated to 5th place classification |

== Knockout stage ==
5–7th classification

16 Sep 1999
| 12:00 | Senegal | 26 : 20 | South Africa |
17 Sep 1999
| 15:00 | Ivory Coast | 40 : 15 | South Africa |
18 Sep 1999
| 10:00 | Ivory Coast | 32 : 23 | Senegal |

| Pos | Team | Pld | W | D | L | GF | GA | GD | Pts |
|---|---|---|---|---|---|---|---|---|---|
| 5 | Ivory Coast | 2 | 2 | 0 | 0 | 72 | 38 | +34 | 4 |
| 6 | Senegal | 2 | 1 | 0 | 1 | 49 | 52 | −3 | 2 |
| 7 | South Africa | 2 | 0 | 0 | 2 | 35 | 66 | −31 | 0 |

Championship bracket

Semifinals
Thu 16 Sep 1999 – 15:00
Angola | 24
Algeria | 14
Thu 16 Sep 1999 – 17:00
(Republic of the Congo) Congo | 21
Cameroon | 19

Final
Sat 18 Sep 1999 – 17:00
Angola | 29
(Republic of the Congo) Congo | 19
Third place
Sat 18 Sep 1999 – 12:00
Cameroon | 30
Algeria | 25

== Final ranking ==
| Rank | Team | Record |
|---|---|---|
| Gold medal | Angola | 4–0 |
| Silver medal | Congo | 2–1 |
| Bronze medal | Cameroon | 2–1 |
| 4 | Algeria | 1–3 |
| 5 | Ivory Coast | 1–2 |
| 6 | Senegal | 0–3 |
| 7 | South Africa | 0–3 |

== Awards ==
1999 All-Africa Games Women's Handball winner

Angola
3rd title
