= Handball at the 1987 All-Africa Games – Men's tournament =

Handball at the 1987 All-Africa Games
Tournament details
- Host country: Kenya
- Venue: 1 (in 1 host city)
- Dates: 2–11 August 1987
- Teams: 7

Final positions
- Champions: Algeria (3rd title)
- Runners-up: Congo
- Third place: Egypt
- Fourth place: Cameroon

The men's handball tournament of the 1987 All-Africa Games were held in Nairobi, Kenya in August 1987.

== Qualified teams ==
Zone	Team
Hosts	Kenya
Zone I	Algeria
Zone II	Senegal
Zone III	Cameroon
Zone IV	Congo
Zone V	Egypt
Zone VI	Mozambique (DNS)
Zone VII	Madagascar

== Squads ==
- Algeria: Mohamed Maachou (GK), Mohamed Hachemi (GK), Bachir Dib (GK), Soufiane Khalfallah, Sid Ahmed Tekfa, Abdelkrim Chouchaoui, Fethnour Lacheheb, Salahedine Agrane, Nabil Rouabhi, Benali Beghouach, Nouredine Khelil, Abdeldjalil Bouanani, Mounir Ben Merabet, Hassen Aït Abdeslem, Sid Ahmed Ledraa, Mokrane Gherbi. Coach : Fodil Hassen Khodja.

== Group stage ==
Team advance to the knockout stage

=== Group A ===
Team	Pld	W	D	L	GF	GA	GD	Pts
Congo	3	2	1	0	107	47	+60	5
Egypt	3	2	1	0	95	62	+33	5
Madagascar	3	1	0	2	0	0	0	2
Kenya	3	0	0	3	0	0	0	0

Date	Team 1	Score	Team 2
2 August 1987	Congo	24 – 24	Egypt
2 August 1987	Kenya	? – ?	Madagascar
4 August 1987	Congo	41 – 17	Madagascar
4 August 1987	Kenya	15 – 44	Egypt
6 August 1987	Egypt	27 – 23	Madagascar
6 August 1987	Kenya	06 – 42	Congo

=== Group B ===
Mozambique withdrew

Team	Pld	W	D	L	GF	GA	GD	Pts
Algeria	2	2	0	0	46	31	+15	4
Cameroon	2	0	1	1	35	40	−5	1
Senegal	2	0	1	1	28	38	−10	1

Date	Team 1	Score	Team 2
2 August 1987	Cameroon	16 – 16	Senegal
5 August 1987	Algeria	22 – 12 (11-05)	Senegal
7 August 1987	Algeria	24 – 19 (12-08)	Cameroon

== Knockout stage ==
Semifinals
9 August – Nairobi
Algeria	18 (10)
Egypt	17 (9)
9 August – Nairobi
Congo	17
Cameroon	16

Final
11 August – Nairobi
Algeria	17 (10)
Congo	15 (5)
Third place
11 August – Nairobi
Egypt	17
Cameroon	11

== Final ranking ==
Rank	Team
Gold medal	Algeria
Silver medal	Congo
Bronze medal	Egypt
4	Cameroon
5 to 7	Madagascar
5 to 7	Senegal
5 to 7	Kenya
-	Mozambique (DNS)
