= Handball at the 1987 All-Africa Games – Women's tournament =

Tournament details
- Host country: Kenya
- Venue(s): 1 (in 1 host city)
- Teams: 8 (from 1 confederation)

Final positions
- Champions: Ivory Coast (1st title)
- Runner-up: Congo
- Third place: Cameroon
- Fourth place: Senegal

The women's handball tournament of the 1987 All-Africa Games were held in August 1987, in Nairobi, Kenya, contested by 8 national teams and won by Ivory Coast.

== Draw ==
Group A	Group B
Congo; Kenya; Madagascar; Tanzania	Algeria; Ivory Coast; Mozambique; Senegal

== Preliminary round ==
=== Group A ===
Poule A

1. Congo, qualified for semi-finals
2. Senegal, qualified for semi-finals
3. Kenya
4. ?

Amongst the results, Congo won 16–4 over Senegal

=== Group B ===
Team	Pld	W	D	L	GF	GA	GD	Pts
Ivory Coast	2	1	1	0	49	29	+20	3
Cameroon	2	1	1	0	32	27	+5	3
Algeria	2	0	0	2	24	49	−25	0

Date	Team 1	Score	Team 2
2 August 1987	Cameroon	16 – 11	Algeria
4 August 1987	Cameroon	16 – 16	Ivory Coast
6 August 1987	Ivory Coast	33 - 13	Algeria

== Knockout stage ==
Championship bracket

Semifinals
8 Aug 1987
Ivory Coast	20
Senegal	12
8 Aug 1987
(Republic of the Congo) Congo	16
Cameroon	14

Final
11 Aug 1987
Ivory Coast	22
(Republic of the Congo) Congo	11
Third place
11 Aug 1987
Cameroon	20
Senegal	12

For the 5th rank, Algeria won 18-13 over Kenya.

== Final ranking ==
Rank	Team
Gold medal	Ivory Coast
Silver medal	Congo
Bronze medal	Cameroon
4	Senegal
5	Algeria
6	Kenya
7	

== Awards ==
1987 All-Africa Games Women's Handball winner

Ivory Coast
1st title
