= Handball at the 1995 All-Africa Games – Women's tournament =

Tournament details
- Host country: Zimbabwe
- Venue: 1 (in 1 host city)
- Teams: 7 (from 1 confederation)

Final positions
- Champions: Angola (2nd title)
- Runners-up: Congo
- Third place: Nigeria
- Fourth place: Algeria

The 1995 edition of the Women's Handball Tournament of the African Games was the 4th, organized by the African Handball Confederation and played under the auspices of the International Handball Federation, the handball sport governing body. The tournament was held, in Harare, Zimbabwe, contested by 7 national teams and won by Angola.

== Incident with the Egyptian team ==
An Egyptian player was accused of being a man and therefore ordered to undergo some tests. In the aftermath, the organization had to apologize to her and her family.

== Knockout stage ==
Championship bracket

Semifinals
Angola
(Republic of the Congo) Congo

Final
Angola	22
(Republic of the Congo) Congo	21
Third place
Nigeria
Algeria

== Final ranking ==
Rank	Team
Gold medal	Angola
Silver medal	Congo
Bronze medal	Nigeria
4	Algeria
5	Egypt
6	Zimbabwe
7	Uganda

== Awards ==
1995 All-Africa Games Women's Handball winner

Angola
2nd title
