= Handball at the 2026 Mediterranean Games =

Handball tournaments

- Venue: Palazzeto dello Sport; Pala San Giacomo
- Dates: 22 August – 1 September
- Nations: 9
- Teams: 8 (men); 6 (women)

The handball tournaments at the 2026 Mediterranean Games in Taranto took place between 22 August and 1 September 2026.

== Medal summary ==
=== Events ===
Event	Gold	Silver	Bronze
Men	Egypt	Greece	Algeria
Women	Italy	Tunisia	Greece

== Participating nations ==
Men

Federation	Nation
CAHB Africa	Algeria; Egypt; Tunisia
EHF Europe	Cyprus; Greece; Italy; Kosovo; Portugal

Women

Federation	Nation
CAHB Africa	Algeria; Tunisia
EHF Europe	Greece; Italy; Kosovo; North Macedonia
