= Togo women's national handball team =

Togo

Information
- Association: Federation Togolaise de Handball

Colours
1st	2nd

Results

African Championship
- Appearances: 2 (First in 1979)
- Best result: 7th (1979, 1996)
- Last updated on Unknown.

The Togo women's national handball team is the national team of Togo. It is governed by the Federation Togolaise de Handball and takes part in international handball competitions.

== African Championship record ==
- 1979 – 7th
- 1996 – 7th
