= Handball at the 2007 African Games =

Sporting event

Tournament details
- Host country: Algeria
- Venues: 2 (in 1 host city)
- Dates: 10 – 19 September
- Teams: 15 (7 men's teams, 8 women's teams) (from 1 confederation)

Final positions
- Champions: Egypt (men); Angola (women)
- Runners-up: Algeria (men); Congo (women)
- Third place: Tunisia (men); Ivory Coast (women)
- Fourth place: Angola (men); Cameroon (women)

The Handball competition at the 2007 All-Africa Games was held in Algiers, Algeria between 14 July and 21 July 2007.

== Men ==
=== Pool A ===
Pos	Team	Pld	W	D	L	GF	GA	GD	Pts
1	Algeria	3	2	0	1	78	67	+11	4
2	Angola	3	2	0	1	84	77	+7	4
3	Cameroon	3	2	0	1	83	71	+12	4
4	Ivory Coast	3	0	0	3	73	103	−30	0

=== Pool B ===
Pos	Team	Pld	W	D	L	GF	GA	GD	Pts
1	Egypt	2	2	0	0	66	60	+6	4
2	Tunisia	2	1	0	1	60	61	−1	2
3	Nigeria	2	0	0	2	60	65	−5	0

=== Play-off ===
Semifinals:

- Algeria ( 30 - 28 ) Tunisia
- Egypt ( 29 - 23 ) Angola

3rd place final:

- Tunisia ( 34 - 31 ) Angola

Final:

- Egypt ( 29 - 21 ) Algeria

== Women ==
=== Pool A ===
Team	Pld	W	D	L	GF	GA	GD	Pts	Qualification
Angola	3	3	0	0	94	78	+16	6	Advance to semi-finals
Ivory Coast	3	2	0	1	77	73	+4	4	Advance to semi-finals
Tunisia	3	1	0	2	66	70	−4	2	Relegated to 5th place classification
Algeria	3	0	0	3	63	79	−16	0	Relegated to 7th place classification

=== Pool B ===
Team	Pld	W	D	L	GF	GA	GD	Pts	Qualification
Congo	3	3	0	0	95	65	+30	6	Advance to semi-finals
Cameroon	3	2	0	1	88	82	+6	4	Advance to semi-finals
Nigeria	3	1	0	2	82	68	+14	2	Relegated to 5th place classification
Kenya	3	0	0	3	56	106	−50	0	Relegated to 7th place classification

=== Play-off ===
Semifinals:

- Angola ( 37 - 21 ) Cameroon
- Congo ( 32 - 26 ) Côte d'Ivoire

3rd place final:

- Côte d'Ivoire ( 25 - 24 ) Cameroon

Final:

- Angola ( 35 - 22 ) Congo
