= Angola 40 Years Tournament =

2015 Angola 40 Years Tournament
Tournament details
- Host country: Angola
- Venue(s): 1 (in 1 host city)
- Dates: February 27–1 March
- Teams: 3 (from 3 confederations)

Final positions
- Champions: Angola
- Runner-up: Portugal
- Third place: Brazil
- Fourth place: Angola B

Tournament statistics
- Matches played: 6
- Goals scored: 322 (53.67 per match)

The Angola 40 years Tournament was a women's friendly handball competition held in Luanda, Angola between February 27–1 March 2015, involving the teams of Angola, Brazil, Portugal and a team of juniors and youth players from Angola as Angola B. It was organised as the host nation preparation to the African Qualification to the 2016 Summer Olympics.

== Results ==
Team	Pld	W	D	L	GF	GA	GD	Pts
Angola	3	3	0	0	95	66	+29	6
Portugal	3	2	0	1	77	85	-8	4
Brazil	3	1	0	2	74	69	-5	2
Angola B	3	0	0	3	81	97	–16	0

== Round robin ==
February 27; 17:00	Angola	39 – 30	Angola B	Pavilhão da Cidadela, Luanda

February 27; 19:00	Brazil	25 – 27	Portugal	Pavilhão da Cidadela, Luanda
February 27; 19:00		(16-15)		Pavilhão da Cidadela, Luanda

February 28; 17:00	Angola B	25 – 30	Brazil	Pavilhão da Cidadela, Luanda
February 28; 17:00		(11-16)		Pavilhão da Cidadela, Luanda

February 28; 19:00	Angola	34 – 22	Portugal	Pavilhão da Cidadela, Luanda
February 28; 19:00		(19-9)		Pavilhão da Cidadela, Luanda

March 1; 17:00	Angola B	26 – 28	Portugal	Pavilhão da Cidadela, Luanda
March 1; 17:00		(12-14)		Pavilhão da Cidadela, Luanda

March 1; 19:00	Angola	22 – 14	Brazil	Pavilhão da Cidadela, Luanda
March 1; 19:00		(12-7)		Pavilhão da Cidadela, Luanda

== Final standing ==
Rank	Team
Gold medal	Angola
2	Portugal
3	Brazil
4	Angola B
