= 1991 African Women's Handball Championship =

1991 African Women's Championship
Tournament details
- Host country: Egypt
- Venue: 1 (in 1 host city)
- Teams: 7 (from 1 confederation)

Final positions
- Champions: Nigeria (1st title)
- Runners-up: Angola
- Third place: Congo
- Fourth place: Algeria

The 1991 African Women's Handball Championship was the ninth edition of the African Women's Handball Championship, held in Egypt. It acted as the African qualifying tournament for the 1992 Summer Olympics.

== Standings ==
| Pos | Team | Pld | W | D | L | GF | GA | GD | Pts |
|---|---|---|---|---|---|---|---|---|---|
| 1 | Nigeria | 5 | 5 | 0 | 0 | 0 | 0 | 0 | 10 |
| 2 | Angola | 6 | 3 | 1 | 2 | 0 | 0 | 0 | 7 |
| 3 | Congo | 5 | 3 | 0 | 2 | 0 | 0 | 0 | 6 |
| 4 | Algeria | 7 | 3 | 1 | 3 | 0 | 0 | 0 | 7 |
| 5 | Senegal | 5 | 2 | 0 | 3 | 0 | 0 | 0 | 4 |
| 6 | Ivory Coast | 6 | 2 | 0 | 4 | 0 | 0 | 0 | 4 |
| 7 | Egypt (H) | 6 | 1 | 0 | 5 | 0 | 0 | 0 | 2 |

Source: Todor66
Rules for classification: 1) points; 2) head-to-head points; 3) head-to-head goal difference; 4) head-to-head number of goals scored; 5) goal difference.
(H) Hosts

== Matches ==
| 6 September 1990 | Congo | 20–16 | Algeria |
| 6 September 1990 | | (6–10) |

| 6 September 1990 | Senegal | v | Ivory Coast |

| 6 September 1990 | Angola | v | Egypt |

| 7 September 1990 | Egypt | 27–12 | Congo |

| 7 September 1990 | Ivory Coast | 23–18 | Angola |
| 7 September 1990 | | (6–11) |

| 7 September 1990 | Nigeria | 24–23 | Senegal |

| 8 September 1990 | Nigeria | 21–17 | Ivory Coast |

| 8 September 1990 | Algeria | 14–11 | Egypt |
| 8 September 1990 | | (8–5) |

| 8 September 1990 | Angola | 31–21 | Congo |

| 10 September 1990 | Angola | v | Algeria |

| 10 September 1990 | Congo | v | Senegal |

| 10 September 1990 | Nigeria | v | Congo |

| 11 September 1990 | Angola | v | Senegal |

| 11 September 1990 | Nigeria | v | Algeria |

| 11 September 1990 | Ivory Coast | v | Egypt |

| 12 September 1990 | Congo | 24–17 | Ivory Coast |
| 12 September 1990 | | (11–12) |

| 12 September 1990 | Algeria | 20–16 | Senegal |
| 12 September 1990 | | (9–7) |

| 12 September 1990 | Nigeria | 20–13 | Egypt |
| 12 September 1990 | | (9–5) |

| 13 September 1990 | Nigeria | 26–22 | Angola |

| 13 September 1990 | Algeria | 15–14 | Ivory Coast |

| 13 September 1990 | Senegal | 15–0 | Egypt |
| 13 September 1990 | | (Walkover) |

== Final ranking ==
| Qualified for the 1992 Summer Olympics |

| Rank | Team |
|---|---|
| Gold medal | Nigeria |
| Silver medal | Angola |
| Bronze medal | Congo |
| 4 | Algeria |
| 5 | Senegal |
| 6 | Ivory Coast |
| 7 | Egypt |
