= Abdel Ghani Loukil =

Algerian handball player (born 1973)

Personal information
- Nationality: Algerian
- Born: 10 June 1973 (age 53)
- Height: 190 cm (75 in)

Sport
- Sport: Handball

Senior clubs
- Years: Team
- 1986–1994: SR Annaba
- 1994–2011: MC Alger
National team
- Years: Team
- 1993–2006: Algeria

Teams managed
- 2021–2023: OM Annaba
- 2024–: Algeria (assistant)

Abdel Ghani Loukil (born 10 June 1973) is an Algerian handball player and coach. He competed in the men's tournament at the 1996 Summer Olympics.
