= Marta Alberto =

Angolan handball player

Personal information
- Full name: Marta Samuel Alberto
- Nationality: Angolan
- Born: 10 February 1995 (age 31)
- Height: 1.80 m (5 ft 11 in)

Sport
- Sport: Handball
- Position: Goalkeeper
- Current club: Primeiro de Agosto
- Number: 20
National team
Years	Team	Apps	(Gls)
–	Angola	18	(1)
Medal record
African Championship
Gold medal – first place	2024 Kinshasa
- Updated on 10 November 2025

Marta Samuel Alberto (born 10 February 1995) is an Angolan handball player for Primeiro de Agosto and the Angolan national team.

She represented Angola at the 2017 World Women's Handball Championship in Germany and the 2021 World Women's Handball Championship in Spain.
