= Handball at the 2007 Arab Games =

Handball at the 2007 Pan Arab Games

The handball competition at the 2007 Pan Arab Games was held in November. Egypt took the gold medal while Algeria and Saudi Arabia won the silver and bronze medals, respectively.

== Final classification ==
| Team | Pld | W | D | L | GF | GA | GD | Pts |
|---|---|---|---|---|---|---|---|---|
| Egypt | 6 | 6 | 0 | 0 | 203 | 140 | +63 | 18 |
| Algeria | 6 | 5 | 0 | 1 | 176 | 138 | +38 | 16 |
| Saudi Arabia | 6 | 4 | 0 | 2 | 177 | 157 | +20 | 14 |
| Jordan | 6 | 3 | 0 | 3 | 162 | 162 | 0 | 12 |
| Morocco | 6 | 1 | 0 | 5 | 129 | 163 | −34 | 8 |
| Iraq | 6 | 1 | 0 | 5 | 155 | 191 | −36 | 8 |
| Libya | 6 | 1 | 0 | 5 | 132 | 183 | −51 | 8 |

== Matches ==
| November 12, 2007 | Saudi Arabia | 36-25 | Iraq |

| November 12, 2007 | Morocco | 21-27 | Jordan |

| November 12, 2007 | Egypt | 34-20 | Libya |

| November 13, 2007 | Algeria | 28-25 | Jordan |

| November 13, 2007 | Morocco | 20-30 | Saudi Arabia |

| November 13, 2007 | Egypt | 34-23 | Iraq |

| November 15, 2007 | Libya | 33-29 | Iraq |

| November 15, 2007 | Algeria | 30-23 | Saudi Arabia |

| November 15, 2007 | Egypt | 34-24 | Morocco |

| November 16, 2007 | Iraq | 26-25 | Morocco |

| November 16, 2007 | Libya | 18-38 | Algeria |

| November 16, 2007 | Jordan | 19-35 | Egypt |

| November 18, 2007 | Morocco | 18-29 | Algeria |

| November 18, 2007 | Saudi Arabia | 32-22 | Libya |

| November 18, 2007 | Iraq | 37-29 | Jordan |

| November 19, 2007 | Jordan | 29-22 | Libya |

| November 19, 2007 | Iraq | 23-26 | Algeria |

| November 19, 2007 | Egypt | 35-29 | Saudi Arabia |

| November 21, 2007 | Libya | 17-21 | Morocco |

| November 21, 2007 | Jordan | 25-27 | Saudi Arabia |

| November 21, 2007 | Algeria | 25-31 | Egypt |
