= Handball at the 1991 All-Africa Games – Men's tournament =

Handball at the 1991 All-Africa Games
Tournament details
- Host country: Egypt
- Venue: 1 (in 1 host city)
- Dates: 24–30 September 1991
- Teams: 8

Final positions
- Champions: Egypt (2nd title)
- Runners-up: Algeria
- Third place: Nigeria
- Fourth place: Cameroon

The handball competitions were held in Cairo, Egypt, from 24 to 30 September 1991, as part of the fifth All‑Africa Games, which ran from 20 September to 1 October 1991.

== Qualified teams ==
Zone	Team
Hosts	Egypt
Zone I	Algeria
Zone II	Senegal
Zone III	Cameroon
Zone IV	Nigeria
Zone V	Ethiopia
Zone VI	Namibia
Zone VII	Madagascar

== Results ==
Following Namibia and Madagascar's withdrawal, the 6 remaining teams played in one unique round-robin tournament :

The results are:

- 21 September 1991: Algeria bt Senegal 17-16.
- 23 September 1991: Algeria bt Ethiopia 30-08.
- 25 September 1991: Algeria bt Nigeria 19-18.
- 27 September 1991: Algeria bt Cameroon 20-14.
- 29 September 1991, 18h (salle omnisports, Cairo): Egypt bt Algeria 16-12 (HT 7-5).
- date unknown: Nigeria bt Ethiopia 50-16.

== Final ranking ==
Rank	Team	Pts	Pld	W	D	L	GF	GA
Gold medal	Egypt	15	5	5	0	0	??	??
Silver medal	Algeria	13	5	4	0	1	98	72
Bronze medal	Nigeria	?	5	?	?	?	??	??
4	Cameroon	?	5	?	?	?	??	??
5	Senegal	?	5	?	?	?	??	??
6	Ethiopia	?	5	?	?	?	??	??
-	Madagascar	Withdraw						
-	Namibia	Withdraw						
