= Ben Ali Beghouach =

Algerian handball player (born 1967)

Personal information
- Nationality: Algerian
- Born: 5 February 1967 (age 59)
- Height: 186 cm (73 in)

Sport
- Sport: Handball

Senior clubs
- Years: Team
- –1992: MC Alger
- 1992–2001: Istres Sports
National team
- Years: Team
- –: Algeria

Teams managed
- 2014–2025: Istres Provence Handball

Ben Ali Beghouach (born 5 February 1967) is an Algerian handball player and coach. He competed at the 1988 Summer Olympics and the 1996 Summer Olympics.

From 2014 to 2025 he was the assistant coach at Istres Provence Handball under Gilles Derot..
