= 1992 African Women's Handball Championship =

1992 African Women's Championship
Tournament details
- Host country: Ivory Coast
- Venue: 1 (in 1 host city)
- Dates: 11–24 November
- Teams: 8 (from 1 confederation)

Final positions
- Champions: Angola (2nd title)
- Runners-up: Congo
- Third place: Ivory Coast
- Fourth place: Nigeria

The 1992 African Women's Handball Championship was the tenth edition of the African Women's Handball Championship, held in Ivory Coast from 11 to 24 November 1992. It acted as the African qualifying tournament for the 1993 World Women's Handball Championship.

== Preliminary round ==
All times are local (UTC±0).

=== Group A ===
Pos	Team	Pld	W	D	L	GF	GA	GD	Pts	Qualification
1	Algeria	1	1	0	0	15	8	+7	2	Main round
2	Nigeria	1	0	0	1	8	15	−7	0	Main round
3	Egypt	0	0	0	0	0	0	0	0	Withdrawn

Source: Todor66
Rules for classification: 1) points; 2) head-to-head points; 3) head-to-head goal difference; 4) head-to-head number of goals scored; 5) goal difference.

15 November 1992; 14:00	Algeria	15–8	Nigeria
15 November 1992; 14:00		(7–3)

=== Group B ===
Pos	Team	Pld	W	D	L	GF	GA	GD	Pts	Qualification
1	Angola	2	2	0	0	0	0	0	4	Main round
2	Senegal	2	1	0	1	38	42	−4	2	Main round
3	Tunisia	2	0	0	2	0	0	0	0	Seventh place game

Source: Todor66
Rules for classification: 1) points; 2) head-to-head points; 3) head-to-head goal difference; 4) head-to-head number of goals scored; 5) goal difference.

14 November 1992; 15:15	Senegal	18–16	Tunisia
14 November 1992; 15:15		(6–8)

15 November 1992; 16:20	Angola	26–20	Senegal
15 November 1992; 16:20		(15–9)

16 November 1992; 14:00	Angola	v	Tunisia

=== Group C ===
Pos	Team	Pld	W	D	L	GF	GA	GD	Pts	Qualification
1	Congo	2	2	0	0	53	25	+28	4	Main round
2	Ivory Coast (H)	2	1	0	1	0	0	0	2	Main round
3	Zaire	2	0	0	2	0	0	0	0	Seventh place game

Source: Todor66
Rules for classification: 1) points; 2) head-to-head points; 3) head-to-head goal difference; 4) head-to-head number of goals scored; 5) goal difference.
(H) Hosts

13 November 1992; 17:15	Congo	34–8	Zaire

15 November 1992; 16:20	Congo	19–17	Ivory Coast
15 November 1992; 16:20		(4–9)

16 November 1992; 15:15	Ivory Coast	v	Zaire

== Main round ==
=== Group I ===
Pos	Team	Pld	W	D	L	GF	GA	GD	Pts	Qualification
1	Congo	2	1	1	0	41	24	+17	3	Final
2	Algeria	2	1	1	0	33	25	+8	3	Third place game
3	Senegal	2	0	0	2	27	52	−25	0	Fifth place game

Source: Todor66
Rules for classification: 1) points; 2) head-to-head points; 3) head-to-head goal difference; 4) head-to-head number of goals scored; 5) goal difference.

18 November 1992; 14:30	Algeria	22–14	Senegal

19 November 1992; 14:30	Congo	11–11	Algeria

20 November 1992; 14:30	Congo	30–13	Senegal
20 November 1992; 14:30		(16–7)

=== Group II ===
Pos	Team	Pld	W	D	L	GF	GA	GD	Pts	Qualification
1	Angola	2	1	1	0	0	0	0	3	Final
2	Ivory Coast (H)	2	1	0	1	0	0	0	2	Third place game
3	Nigeria	2	0	1	1	0	0	0	1	Fifth place game

Source: Todor66
Rules for classification: 1) points; 2) head-to-head points; 3) head-to-head goal difference; 4) head-to-head number of goals scored; 5) goal difference.
(H) Hosts

18 November 1992; 15:45	Angola	v	Nigeria

19 November 1992; 15:45	Ivory Coast	v	Nigeria

20 November 1992; 15:45	Angola	18–17	Ivory Coast

== Placement games ==
=== Seventh place game ===
21 November 1992; 14:30	Tunisia	22–16	Zaire
21 November 1992; 14:30		(13–9)

=== Fifth place game ===
21 November 1992; 15:45	Nigeria	20–17	Senegal
21 November 1992; 15:45		(8–12)

=== Third place game ===
21 November 1992
17:00
Ivory Coast
20–16 (ET)
Algeria

(8–7)

FT: 16–16 ET: 4–0

=== Final ===
22 November 1992; 14:30	Angola	25–18	Congo
22 November 1992; 14:30		(11–6)

== Final ranking ==
Qualified for the 1993 World Championship

Rank	Team
Gold medal	Angola
Silver medal	Congo
Bronze medal	Ivory Coast
4	Nigeria
5	Algeria
6	Senegal
7	Tunisia
8	Zaire
