= 2000 African Men's Handball Championship =

2000 African Men's Championship
Tournament details
- Host country: Algeria
- Venue(s): 2 (in 1 host city)
- Dates: 22 April – 1 May
- Teams: 7 (from 1 confederation)

Final positions
- Champions: Egypt (3rd title)
- Runner-up: Algeria
- Third place: Tunisia
- Fourth place: Morocco

Tournament statistics
- Matches played: 21
- Goals scored: 882 (42 per match)

The 2000 African Men's Handball Championship was the 14th edition of the African Men's Handball Championship, held in Algiers, Algeria, from 22 April to 1 May 2000. It acted as the African qualifying tournament for the 2001 World Championship in France.

Egypt finished first in the round robin tournament and wins its third African title. Algeria finished second and Tunisia third.

== Qualified teams ==
- Algeria (hosts)
- Congo
- DR Congo
- Egypt
- Gabon
- Morocco
- Tunisia

== Venues ==
| Algiers | 2000 African Men's Handball Championship is located in Algeria | Algiers |
| Hacène Harcha Arena | 2000 African Men's Handball Championship is located in Algeria | Djasr Kasentina Arena |
| Capacity: 8,000 | 2000 African Men's Handball Championship is located in Algeria | Capacity: 4,000 |

== Standings ==
| Pos | Team | Pld | W | D | L | GF | GA | GD | Pts | Qualification |
|---|---|---|---|---|---|---|---|---|---|---|
| 1st place, gold medalist(s) | Egypt | 6 | 6 | 0 | 0 | 175 | 100 | +75 | 12 | Qualified for the 2001 World Championship |
| 2nd place, silver medalist(s) | Algeria (H) | 6 | 5 | 0 | 1 | 140 | 72 | +68 | 10 | Qualified for the 2001 World Championship |
| 3rd place, bronze medalist(s) | Tunisia | 6 | 3 | 1 | 2 | 151 | 82 | +69 | 7 | Qualified for the 2001 World Championship |
| 4 | Morocco | 6 | 3 | 1 | 2 | 137 | 113 | +24 | 7 | Qualified for the 2001 World Championship |
| 5 | Congo | 6 | 2 | 0 | 4 | 112 | 156 | −44 | 4 | |
| 6 | Gabon | 6 | 1 | 0 | 5 | 80 | 158 | −78 | 2 | |
| 7 | DR Congo | 6 | 0 | 0 | 6 | 87 | 201 | −114 | 0 | |

(H) Hosts

== Matches ==
All times are local (UTC+1).

| 22 April 2000; 15:30 | Algeria | 32–8 | Gabon | Hacène Harcha Arena, Algiers |
| 22 April 2000; 15:30 | | (15–3) | | Hacène Harcha Arena, Algiers |

| 23 April 2000; 16:30 | Tunisia | 15–15 | Morocco | Hacène Harcha Arena, Algiers |
| 23 April 2000; 16:30 | | (9–7) | | Hacène Harcha Arena, Algiers |

| 23 April 2000; 16:30 | Egypt | 35–18 | Congo | Omnisports Arena, Djasr Kasentina (Algiers) |
| 23 April 2000; 16:30 | | (18–8) | | Omnisports Arena, Djasr Kasentina (Algiers) |

| 24 April 2000; 14:30 | Tunisia | 51–12 | DR Congo | Omnisports Arena, Djasr Kasentina (Algiers) |
| 24 April 2000; 14:30 | | (23–3) | | Omnisports Arena, Djasr Kasentina (Algiers) |

| 24 April 2000; 16:30 | Algeria | 21–8 | Congo | Hacène Harcha Arena, Algiers |
| 24 April 2000; 16:30 | | (10–5) | | Hacène Harcha Arena, Algiers |

| 24 April 2000; 18:30 | Egypt | 29–18 | Morocco | Hacène Harcha Arena, Algiers |
| 24 April 2000; 18:30 | | (13–7) | | Hacène Harcha Arena, Algiers |

| 25 April 2000; 16:30 | Egypt | 22–20 | Algeria | Hacène Harcha Arena, Algiers |
| 25 April 2000; 16:30 | | (10–9) | | Hacène Harcha Arena, Algiers |

| 25 April 2000; 16:30 | Tunisia | 28–9 | Gabon | Omnisports Arena, Djasr Kasentina (Algiers) |
| 25 April 2000; 16:30 | | (16–5) | | Omnisports Arena, Djasr Kasentina (Algiers) |

| 25 April 2000; 18:30 | Congo | 27–19 | DR Congo | Hacène Harcha Arena, Algiers |
| 25 April 2000; 18:30 | | (12–11) | | Hacène Harcha Arena, Algiers |

| 27 April 2000; 14:30 | Morocco | 26–14 | Gabon | Omnisports Arena, Djasr Kasentina (Algiers) |
| 27 April 2000; 14:30 | | (9–8) | | Omnisports Arena, Djasr Kasentina (Algiers) |

| 27 April 2000; 16:30 | Tunisia | 31–15 | Congo | Hacène Harcha Arena, Algiers |
| 27 April 2000; 16:30 | | (15–7) | | Hacène Harcha Arena, Algiers |

| 27 April 2000; 16:30 | Egypt | 38–14 | DR Congo | Omnisports Arena, Djasr Kasentina (Algiers) |
| 27 April 2000; 16:30 | | (14–9) | | Omnisports Arena, Djasr Kasentina (Algiers) |

| 28 April 2000; 16:30 | Algeria | 36–10 | DR Congo | Hacène Harcha Arena, Algiers |
| 28 April 2000; 16:30 | | (16–3) | | Hacène Harcha Arena, Algiers |

| 28 April 2000; 16:30 | Egypt | 33–15 | Gabon | Omnisports Arena, Djasr Kasentina (Algiers) |
| 28 April 2000; 16:30 | | (18–6) | | Omnisports Arena, Djasr Kasentina (Algiers) |

| 28 April 2000; 18:30 | Morocco | 34–22 | Congo | Hacène Harcha Arena, Algiers |
| 28 April 2000; 18:30 | | (15–11) | | Hacène Harcha Arena, Algiers |

| 29 April 2000; 14:30 | Gabon | 18–17 | DR Congo | Omnisports Arena, Djasr Kasentina (Algiers) |
| 29 April 2000; 14:30 | | (10–8) | | Omnisports Arena, Djasr Kasentina (Algiers) |

| 29 April 2000; 16:30 | Algeria | 18–13 | Morocco | Hacène Harcha Arena, Algiers |
| 29 April 2000; 16:30 | | (11–6) | | Hacène Harcha Arena, Algiers |

| 29 April 2000; 18:30 | Egypt | 18–15 | Tunisia | Hacène Harcha Arena, Algiers |
| 29 April 2000; 18:30 | | (9–7) | | Hacène Harcha Arena, Algiers |

| 1 May 2000; 14:30 | Congo | 22–16 | Gabon | Hacène Harcha Arena, Algiers |
| 1 May 2000; 14:30 | | (11–5) | | Hacène Harcha Arena, Algiers |

| 1 May 2000; 16:30 | Morocco | 31–15 | DR Congo | Hacène Harcha Arena, Algiers |
| 1 May 2000; 16:30 | | (14–9) | | Hacène Harcha Arena, Algiers |

| 1 May 2000; 18:30 | Algeria | 13–11 | Tunisia | Hacène Harcha Arena, Algiers |
| 1 May 2000; 18:30 | | (8–6) | | Hacène Harcha Arena, Algiers |
