= 1996 African Women's Handball Championship =

1996 African Women's Championship
Tournament details
- Host country: Benin
- Venue: 1 (in 1 host city)
- Dates: 16–29 October
- Teams: 7 (from 1 confederation)

Final positions
- Champions: Ivory Coast (2nd title)
- Runners-up: Algeria
- Third place: Angola
- Fourth place: Congo

Tournament statistics
- Matches played: 16
- Goals scored: 777 (48.56 per match)

The 1996 African Women's Handball Championship was the twelfth edition of the African Women's Handball Championship, held in Benin from 16 to 29 October 1996. It acted as the African qualifying tournament for the 1997 World Women's Handball Championship.

== Preliminary round ==
=== Group A ===
Team	Pld	W	D	L	GF	GA	GD	Pts
Ivory Coast	2	2	0	0	57	37	+20	4
Algeria	2	1	0	1	57	33	+24	2
Togo	2	0	0	2	20	64	−44	0

Algeria	33–7	Togo
	(18–3)

Ivory Coast	31–13	Togo
	(15–5)

Ivory Coast	26–24	Algeria
	(10–11)

=== Group B ===
Team	Pld	W	D	L	GF	GA	GD	Pts
Congo	3	3	0	0	84	63	+21	6
Angola	3	2	0	1	86	68	+18	4
Cameroon	3	1	0	2	68	81	−13	2
Mozambique	3	0	0	3	65	91	−26	0

Congo	28–18	Cameroon
	(15–11)

Angola	34–19	Mozambique
	(15–7)

Congo	26–24	Angola
	(14–9)

Cameroon	27–25	Mozambique
	(16–15)

Angola	28–23	Cameroon
	(14–12)

Congo	30–21	Mozambique
	(15–8)

== Knockout stage ==
=== Places 5–7 ===
Team	Pld	W	D	L	GF	GA	GD	Pts
Cameroon	2	2	0	0	61	30	+31	4
Mozambique	2	1	0	1	49	46	+3	2
Togo	2	0	0	2	30	64	−34	0

Cameroon	33–12	Togo
	(15–5)

Cameroon	28–18	Mozambique
	(16–8)

Mozambique	31–18	Togo
	(18–7)

=== Bracket ===
Semifinals
Ivory Coast	29
Angola	25
Algeria (OT)	24
Congo	23

Final
Ivory Coast	35
Algeria	19
Third place
Angola	24
Congo	21

=== Semifinals ===
Ivory Coast	29–25	Angola
	(11–9)

Algeria
24–23 (ET)
Congo

(9–9)

FT: 20–20 ET: 4–3

=== Third place game ===
Angola	24–21	Congo
	(10–10)

=== Final ===
Ivory Coast	35–19	Algeria
	(18–8)

== Final ranking ==
Qualified for the 1997 World Championship

Rank	Team
Gold medal	Ivory Coast
Silver medal	Algeria
Bronze medal	Angola
4	Congo
5	Cameroon
6	Mozambique
7	Togo
