= Handball at the 1973 All-Africa Games =

All-Africa Games Handball events

Tournament details
- Host country: Nigeria
- City: Lagos
- Venue: 1 (in 1 host city)
- Dates: January 1973
- Teams: 8

Final positions
- Champions: Algeria (1st title)
- Runners-up: Egypt
- Third place: Senegal
- Fourth place: Ivory Coast

Tournament statistics
- Matches played: 16
- Goals scored: 509 (31.81 per match)

The Handball events at the 1973 All-Africa Games were held in Lagos, Nigeria in January 1973. The competition included only men's event.

== Qualified teams ==
Zone	Team
Hosts	Nigeria
Zone I	Algeria
Zone II	Senegal
Zone III	Ivory Coast
Zone IV	Togo
Zone V	Cameroon
Zone VI	Egypt
Zone VII	Madagascar

== Group stage ==
All times are local (UTC+1).

Team advance to the knockout stage

=== Group A ===
Team	Pld	W	D	L	GF	GA	GD	Pts
Egypt	3	2	0	1	50	46	+4	4
Algeria	3	2	0	1	45	41	+4	4
Cameroon	3	1	0	2	50	45	+5	2
Togo	3	1	0	2	41	54	−13	2

... January 1973	Cameroon	23–13	Egypt	Lagos

... January 1973	Algeria	17–14	Togo	Lagos

... January 1973	Egypt	22–11	Togo	Lagos

... January 1973	Algeria	16–12	Cameroon	Lagos

... January 1973	Togo	16–15	Cameroon	Lagos

... January 1973	Egypt	15–12	Algeria	Lagos

=== Group B ===
Team	Pld	W	D	L	GF	GA	GD	Pts
Senegal	3	3	0	0	62	39	+23	6
Ivory Coast	3	2	0	1	66	45	+21	4
Madagascar	3	1	0	2	48	64	−16	2
Nigeria	3	0	0	3	38	67	−29	0

... January 1973	Senegal	18–13	Ivory Coast	Lagos

... January 1973	Madagascar	17–16	Nigeria	Lagos

... January 1973	Senegal	21–15	Madagascar	Lagos

... January 1973	Ivory Coast	27–11	Nigeria	Lagos

... January 1973	Senegal	23–11	Nigeria	Lagos

... January 1973	Ivory Coast	26–16	Madagascar	Lagos

== Knockout stage ==
Semifinals
.. January – Lagos
Egypt	15
Ivory Coast	13
.. January – Lagos
Senegal	14
Algeria	17

Final
14 January – Lagos
Egypt	12
Algeria	14
Third place
14 January – Lagos
Ivory Coast	7
Senegal	17

=== Semifinals ===
... January 1973	Egypt	15–13	Ivory Coast	Lagos

... January 1973	Senegal	14–17	Algeria	Lagos

=== Third place match ===
14 January 1973	Ivory Coast	7–17	Senegal	Lagos

=== Final ===
14 January 1973	Egypt	12–14	Algeria	Lagos

== Final standing ==
Pos	Team	Pld	W	D	L	Pts
Gold medal	Algeria	5	4	0	1	8
Silver medal	Egypt	5	3	0	2	6
Bronze medal	Senegal	5	4	0	1	8
4	Ivory Coast	5	2	0	3	4
5	Cameroon	3	1	0	2	2
6	Madagascar	3	1	0	2	2
7	Togo	3	1	0	2	2
8	Nigeria	3	0	0	3	0
