= Handball at the 1978 All-Africa Games – Women's tournament =

Tournament details
- Host country: Algeria
- Venue(s): 1 (in 1 host city)
- Teams: 6 (from 1 confederation)

Final positions
- Champions: Algeria (1st title)
- Runner-up: Cameroon
- Third place: Tunisia
- Fourth place: Ivory Coast

Tournament statistics
- Matches played: 11
- Goals scored: 277 (25.18 per match)

The 1978 edition of the Women's Handball Tournament of the African Games was the 1st, organized by the African Handball Confederation and played under the auspices of the International Handball Federation, the handball sport governing body. The tournament was held in Algiers, Algeria, contested by 6 national teams and won by Algeria.

== Draw ==
Group A	Group B
Algeria; Ivory Coast; Nigeria	Cameroon; Egypt; Tunisia

== Preliminary round ==
=== Group A ===
⋅
Algeria	14 : 08	Nigeria
Algeria	17 : 13	Ivory Coast
Ivory Coast	15 : 13	Nigeria

Team	Pld	W	D	L	GF	GA	GD	Pts	Qualification
Algeria	2	2	0	0	31	21	+10	4	Advance to semi-finals
Ivory Coast	2	1	0	1	28	30	−2	2	Advance to semi-finals
Nigeria	2	0	0	2	21	29	−8	0	Relegated to 5th place classification

=== Group B ===
⋅
Tunisia	12 : 04	Egypt
Cameroon	13 : 10	Egypt
Tunisia	13 : 13	Cameroon

Team	Pld	W	D	L	GF	GA	GD	Pts	Qualification
Tunisia	2	1	1	0	25	17	+8	3	Advance to semi-finals
Cameroon	2	1	1	0	26	23	+3	3	Advance to semi-finals
Egypt	2	0	0	2	14	25	−11	0	Relegated to 5th place classification

== Knockout stage ==
Fifth place

⋅
Nigeria	21 : 14	Egypt

Championship bracket

Semifinals
Algeria	9
Tunisia	8
Cameroon	14
Ivory Coast	12

Final
Algeria	17
Cameroon	12
Third place
Tunisia	19
Ivory Coast	6

== Final ranking ==
Rank	Team	Record
Gold medal	Algeria	4–0
Silver medal	Cameroon	2–1
Bronze medal	Tunisia	2–1
4	Ivory Coast	1–3
5	Nigeria	1–2
6	Egypt	0–3

== Awards ==
1978 All-Africa Games Women's Handball winner

Algeria
1st title
