= 1998 African Women's Handball Championship =

1998 African Women's Championship
Tournament details
- Host country: South Africa
- Venue: 1 (in 1 host city)
- Dates: 18–28 October
- Teams: 6 (from 1 confederation)

Final positions
- Champions: Angola (4th title)
- Runners-up: Congo
- Third place: Ivory Coast
- Fourth place: Cameroon

Tournament statistics
- Matches played: 11
- Goals scored: 544 (49.45 per match)

The 1998 African Women's Handball Championship was the 13th edition of the African Women's Handball Championship, held in South Africa from 18 to 28 October 1998. It acted as the African qualifying tournament for the 1999 World Women's Handball Championship.

== Preliminary round ==
=== Group A ===
Team	Pld	W	D	L	GF	GA	GD	Pts
Angola	2	1	1	0	70	36	+34	3
Ivory Coast	2	1	1	0	54	31	+23	3
Mozambique	2	0	0	2	33	90	−57	0

19 October 1998	Angola	53–19	Mozambique

Ivory Coast	37–14	Mozambique

Angola	17–17	Ivory Coast

=== Group B ===
Team	Pld	W	D	L	GF	GA	GD	Pts
Congo	2	2	0	0	68	23	+45	4
Cameroon	2	1	0	1	63	33	+30	2
South Africa (H)	2	0	0	2	16	91	−75	0

(H) Hosts

Congo	46–5	South Africa

Cameroon	45–11	South Africa

Congo	22–18	Cameroon

== Knockout stage ==
=== Bracket ===
Semifinals
Mon, 26 Oct 1998
Angola	26
Cameroon	21
Mon, 26 Oct 1998
Ivory Coast	14
Congo	18

Final
Wed, 28 Oct 1998
Angola	31
Congo	23
Third place
Wed, 28 Oct 1998
Cameroon	30
Ivory Coast	28

=== Semifinals ===
26 October 1998	Angola	26–21	Cameroon

Congo	18–14	Ivory Coast

=== Fifth place game ===
Mozambique	32–17	South Africa

=== Third place game ===
28 October 1998	Ivory Coast	30–28	Cameroon

=== Final ===
28 October 1998	Angola	31–23	Congo
28 October 1998		(19–15)

== Final ranking ==
Qualified for the 1999 World Championship

Rank	Team
Gold medal	Angola
Silver medal	Congo
Bronze medal	Ivory Coast
4	Cameroon
5	Mozambique
6	South Africa
