= Handball at the 1995 All-Africa Games – Men's tournament =

Handball at the 1995 All-Africa Games
Tournament details
- Host country: Zimbabwe
- Venue(s): 1 (in 1 host city)
- Dates: September 1995
- Teams: 4

Final positions
- Champions: Egypt (3rd title)
- Runners-up: Cameroon
- Third place: Nigeria
- Fourth place: Zimbabwe

The Handball events at the 1995 All-Africa Games were held in Harare, Zimbabwe in September 1995.

== Qualified teams ==
Zone	Team
Hosts	Zimbabwe
Zone I	(withdrew)
Zone II	(withdrew)
Zone III	Cameroon
Zone IV	Nigeria
Zone V	Egypt
Zone VI	(withdrew)
Zone VII	(withdrew)

== Final tournament ==
All times are local (UTC+2).

=== Matches ===
... September 1995	Nigeria	–	Zimbabwe	Harare

... September 1995	Egypt	26–18	Cameroon	Harare

... September 1995	Egypt	54–7	Zimbabwe	Harare

... September 1995	Cameroon	–	Nigeria	Harare

... September 1995	Cameroon	–	Zimbabwe	Harare

... September 1995	Egypt	23–20	Nigeria	Harare

=== Tournament classification ===
Rank	Team	Pld	W	D	L
Gold medal	Egypt	3	3	0	0
Silver medal	Cameroon	3	2	0	1
Bronze medal	Nigeria	3	1	0	2
4	Zimbabwe	3	0	0	3
