= South Africa women's national handball team =

South Africa

Information
- Association: South African Handball Federation

Colours
1st	2nd

Results

African Championship
- Appearances: 1 (First in 1998)
- Best result: 6th (1998)
- Last updated on Unknown.

The South Africa women's national handball team is the national team handball team of South Africa. It is governed by the South African Handball Federation and takes part in international handball competitions.

== African Championship record ==
- 1998 – 6th
