= Algeria men's national handball team =

Algeria

Information
- Association: Algerian Handball Federation
- Coach: Raúl Alonso
- Assistant coach: Abdel Ghani Loukil
- Captain: Messaoud Berkous

Colours
1st	2nd

Results

Summer Olympics
- Appearances: 4 (First in 1980)
- Best result: 10th (1980, 1988, 1996)

World Championship
- Appearances: 17 (First in 1974)
- Best result: 13th (2001)

African Championship
- Appearances: 26 (First in 1976)
- Best result: (gold) 1st (1981, 1983, 1985, 1987, 1989, 1996, 2014)
- Last updated on Unknown.

Algeria men's national handball team
Medal record

African Championship
Gold medal – first place	1981 Tunisia	
Gold medal – first place	1983 Egypt	
Gold medal – first place	1985 Angola	
Gold medal – first place	1987 Morocco	
Gold medal – first place	1989 Algeria	
Gold medal – first place	1996 Benin	
Gold medal – first place	2014 Algeria	
Silver medal – second place	1976 Algeria	
Silver medal – second place	1991 Egypt	
Silver medal – second place	1994 Tunisia	
Silver medal – second place	1998 South Africa	
Silver medal – second place	2000 Algeria	
Silver medal – second place	2002 Morocco	
Silver medal – second place	2012 Morocco	
Silver medal – second place	2024 Egypt	
Bronze medal – third place	1979 Congo	
Bronze medal – third place	1992 Côte d'Ivoire	
Bronze medal – third place	2008 Angola	
Bronze medal – third place	2010 Egypt	
Bronze medal – third place	2020 Tunisia	

African Games
Gold medal – first place	1973 Lagos	
Gold medal – first place	1978 Algiers	
Gold medal – first place	1987 Nairobi	
Gold medal – first place	1999 Johannesburg	
Silver medal – second place	1991 Cairo	
Silver medal – second place	2003 Abuja	
Silver medal – second place	2007 Algiers	Team
Bronze medal – third place	2011 Maputo	Team

Mediterranean Games
Gold medal – first place	1987 Latakia	
Silver medal – second place	1983 Casablanca	
Bronze medal – third place	1975 Algiers	
Bronze medal – third place	2026 Taranto	

Arab Games
Silver medal – second place	1985 Rabat	
Silver medal – second place	2007 Cairo	Team
Bronze medal – third place	2023 Algeria	Team

Islamic Solidarity Games
Gold medal – first place	2005 Saudi Arabia	Team

The Algeria national handball team is the national handball team of Algeria and is controlled by the Algerian Handball Federation.

== History ==
Algeria became a great handball country from the 1970s when they were gold medalists twice in the African Games in 1973 and in 1978. In the beginning of the 1980s, the domination of Algeria in the African handball started when it won five consecutive African titles from 1981 to 1989. Algeria had participated in the World Handball Championship for 17 times, in the Olympic Gamess for 4 times.

Aziz Derouaz, the coach of Algeria team in the 1980s is the man who invented the Offensive-Defense style and practiced it for the first time in the 1982 World Handball Championship.

Many great players have made history of the Algerian handball such as Abdelkrim Bendjemil, Omar Azeb, Brahim Boudrali, Abdelkrim Hammiche, Mustapha Doballah, Abdeslam Benmaghsoula, Sofiane Elimam, Rédouane Aouachria, Djaffar Belhoucine, Mahmoud Bouanik, Abdeldjalil Bouanani, Salim Nedjel and many others.

== Competitive record ==
=== World Championship ===
Year	Round	Position	Pld	W	D	L	GF	GA	GD
(Germany) 1938	did not enter								
(Sweden) 1954	did not enter								
(East Germany) 1958	did not enter								
(West Germany) 1961	did not enter								
(Czech Republic) 1964	did not qualify								
(Sweden) 1967	did not qualify								
(France) 1970	did not qualify								
(East Germany) 1974	Preliminary Round	15	3	0	0	3	38	88	−50
(Denmark) 1978	did not qualify								
(West Germany) 1982	Preliminary Round	16	6	0	1	5	112	145	−33
(Switzerland) 1986	Preliminary Round	16	6	0	0	6	119	151	−32
(Czech Republic) 1990	Preliminary Round	16	6	0	1	5	113	128	−15
(Sweden) 1993	did not qualify								
(Iceland) 1995	Round of 16	16	7	2	0	5	146	174	−28
(Japan) 1997	Preliminary Round	17	5	1	2	2	103	112	−9
(Egypt) 1999	Round of 16	15	6	1	1	4	123	148	−25
(France) 2001	Round of 16	13	6	2	1	3	128	126	+2
(Portugal) 2003	Preliminary round	18	5	0	2	3	119	136	−17
(Tunisia) 2005	Preliminary round	17	5	1	1	3	138	153	−15
(Germany) 2007	did not qualify								
(Croatia) 2009	Preliminary round	19	9	4	0	5	235	272	−37
(Sweden) 2011	Preliminary round	15	7	3	0	4	153	162	−9
(Spain) 2013	Preliminary round	17	7	3	1	3	180	173	+7
(Qatar) 2015	Preliminary round	24	7	0	1	6	162	218	−56
(France) 2017	did not qualify								
(Denmark) (Germany) 2019	did not qualify								
(Egypt) 2021	Main Round	22	6	1	0	5	140	180	−40
(Poland) (Sweden) 2023	Presidents Cup	31	7	1	0	6	183	233	−50
(Croatia) (Denmark) (Norway) 2025	Presidents Cup	30	7	1	0	6	191	233	−42
(Germany) 2027	Qualified								
(France) (Germany) 2029	TBD								
(Denmark) (Iceland) (Norway) 2031	TBD								
Total	18/29	0 Titles	105	20	11	74	2383	2832	−449

=== Olympic Games ===
Games	Round	Position	Pld	W	D	L	GF	GA	GD
(Germany) 1936 Berlin	did not enter								
Not held from 1948 to 1968
(West Germany) 1972 Munich	did not qualify								
(Canada) 1976 Montreal	did not qualify								
(Soviet Union) 1980 Moscow	Match for 9th place	10th of 12	6	1	0	5	114	152	−38
(United States) 1984 Los Angeles	Match for 11th place	12th of 12	6	0	0	6	96	130	−34
(South Korea) 1988 Seoul	Match for 9th place	10th of 12	6	1	0	5	104	130	−26
(Spain) 1992 Barcelona	did not qualify								
(United States) 1996 Atlanta	Match for 9th place	10th of 12	6	0	1	5	121	144	−23
(Australia) 2000 Sydney	did not qualify								
(Greece) 2004 Athens	did not qualify								
(China) 2008 Beijing	did not qualify								
(United Kingdom) 2012 London	did not qualify								
(Brazil) 2016 Rio de Janeiro	did not qualify								
(Japan) 2020 Tokyo	did not qualify								
(France) 2024 Paris	did not qualify								
Total	4/15	0 Titles	24	2	1	21	435	556	−121

=== African Championship ===
Year	Round	Position	Pld	W	D	L	GF	GA	GD
(Tunisia) 1974	did not enter								
(Algeria) 1976	Runners-up	2	4	3	0	1	96	73	+23
(Republic of the Congo) 1979	Third place	3	5	4	0	1	147	108	+39
(Tunisia) 1981	Champions	1	4	3	1	0	98	76	+22
(Egypt) 1983	Champions	1	6	6	0	0	133	115	+18
(Tunisia) 1985	Champions	1	5	5	0	0	110	81	+29
(Morocco) 1987	Champions	1	5	5	0	0	116	86	+30
(Algeria) 1989	Champions	1	5	5	0	0	102	80	+22
(Egypt) 1991	Runners-up	2	6	5	0	1	129	90	+39
(Ivory Coast) 1992	Third place	3	5	4	0	1	107	69	+38
(Tunisia) 1994	Runners-up	2	6	4	0	2	167	99	+68
(Benin) 1996	Champions	1	6	6	0	0	140	96	+44
(South Africa) 1998	Runners-up	2	6	4	0	2	173	113	+60
(Algeria) 2000	Runners-up	2	6	5	0	1	140	72	+68
(Morocco) 2002	Runners-up	2	5	4	0	1	124	103	+21
(Egypt) 2004	Fourth place	4	6	3	0	3	188	145	+43
(Tunisia) 2006	Fifth place	5	6	3	0	3	156	136	+20
(Angola) 2008	Third place	3	5	3	0	2	123	126	−3
(Egypt) 2010	Third place	3	7	5	1	1	196	128	+68
(Morocco) 2012	Runners-up	2	8	6	1	1	228	182	+46
(Algeria) 2014	Champions	1	8	8	0	0	240	166	+74
(Egypt) 2016	Fourth place	4	8	5	0	3	216	194	+22
(Gabon) 2018	Sixth place	6	7	3	1	3	193	182	+11
(Tunisia) 2020	Third place	3	7	5	0	2	204	170	+34
(Egypt) 2022	Fifth place	5	5	3	0	2	133	150	−17
(Egypt) 2024	Runners-up	2	6	5	0	1	184	147	+37
(Rwanda) 2026	Fourth place	4	7	3	0	4	208	197	+11
Total	26/27	7 Titles	154	115	4	35	4051	3184	+867

=== African Games ===
Games	Round	Position	Pld	W	D	L	GF	GA	GD
(Republic of the Congo) 1965 Brazzaville	did not enter								
(Nigeria) 1973 Lagos	Champions	1st of 8	5	4	0	1	76	67	+9
(Algeria) 1978 Algiers	Champions	1st of 6	4	4	0	0	96	58	+38
(Kenya) 1987 Nairobi	Champions	1st of 8	4	4	0	0	81	63	+18
(Egypt) 1991 Cairo	Runners-up	2nd of 8	5	4	0	1	98	72	+26
(Zimbabwe) 1995 Harare	did not enter								
(South Africa) 1999 Johannesburg	Champions	1st of 4	6	5	0	1	181	102	+79
(Nigeria) 2003 Abuja	Runners-up	2nd of 8	5	4	0	1	142	105	+37
(Algeria) 2007 Algiers	Runners-up	2nd of 7	5	3	0	2	129	124	+5
(Mozambique) 2011 Maputo	Third place	3rd of 12	5	3	0	2	134	112	+22
(Republic of the Congo) 2015 Brazzaville	did not enter								
(Morocco) 2019 Rabat	Fourth place	4th of 9	7	3	2	2	179	177	+2
(Ghana) 2023 Accra	did not enter								
Total	9/13	4 Titles	46	34	2	10	1116	880	+236

=== Mediterranean Games ===
Games	Round	Position	Pld	W	D	L	GF	GA	GD
(Tunisia) 1967 Tunis	Fourth place	4th of 4	3	0	0	3	30	58	-28
(Turkey) 1971 İzmir	Tournament canceled								
(Algeria) 1975 Algiers	Third place	3rd of 5	4	2	0	2	80	84	-4
(Socialist Federal Republic of Yugoslavia) 1979 Split	Fifth place	5th of 7	4	2	0	2	68	73	-5
(Morocco) 1983 Casablanca	Runners-up	2nd of 8	5	3	1	1	97	80	+17
(Syria) 1987 Latakia	Champions	1st of 8	5	4	0	1	113	95	+18
(Greece) 1991 Athens	Fifth place	5th of 8	6	3	2	1	150	115	+35
(France) 1993 Languedoc-Roussillon	did not enter								
(Italy) 1997 Bari	Seventh place	7th of 8	5	3	0	2	120	113	+7
(Tunisia) 2001 Tunis	Seventh place	7th of 8	4	2	0	2	104	100	+4
(Spain) 2005 Almería	did not enter								
(Italy) 2009 Pescara	Fifth place	5th of 9	4	2	1	1	135	87	+48
(Turkey) 2013 Mersin	Ninth place	9th of 10	5	2	0	3	122	133	−11
(Spain) 2018 Tarragona	Seventh place	7th of 13	5	2	0	3	151	160	−9
(Algeria) 2022 Oran	Sixth place	6th of 10	5	2	1	2	145	146	−1
(Italy) 2026 Taranto	Third place	3rd of 8	5	3	1	1	120	110	+10
Total	13/15	1 Title	60	30	6	24	1435	1354	+81

=== African University Games ===
- 1975 – Winners

=== World Confederations Cup ===
- 1998 – Winners

=== Arab Championship ===
- 1988 – 2nd
- 2000 – Winners

=== Pan Arab Games ===
- 1985 – Silver
- 2007 – Silver
- 2023 - Bronze

=== Islamic Solidarity Games ===
- 2005 – Gold

== Current squad ==
The squad for the 2025 World Men's Handball Championship.

Head coach: Farouk Dehili

No.	Pos.	Name	Date of birth (age)	Height	App.	Goals	Club
2	LB	Zouhir Naim	3 May 1996 (age 30)	1.88 m	0	0	(United Arab Emirates) Sharjah SC
5	CB	Hani Bounab	20 December 2000 (age 25)	1.89 m	13	50	(Algeria) JSE Skikda
6	LB	Messaoud Berkous	20 July 1989 (age 37)	1.94 m	163	472	(Qatar) Al-Arabi
7	LW	Hichem Daoud	9 January 1992 (age 34)	1.91 m	67	115	(France) Pau Billère handball
11	RW	Ali Boulesha	9 November 1991 (age 34)	1.80 m	0	0	(Algeria) JSE Skikda
15	RW	Redouane Saker	1 October 1991 (age 34)	1.79 m	36	52	(Algeria) JSE Skikda
16	GK	Yahia Zemouchi	17 September 1994 (age 31)	1.90 m	25	0	(Algeria) HBC El Biar
17	P	Zine Boughaba	21 March 2000 (age 26)	2.00 m	10	15	(Qatar) Al-Shamal
22	GK	Khalifa Ghedbane	26 November 1996 (age 29)	2.02 m	99	5	(Germany) HC Erlangen
24	CB	Rayane Abrous	16 August 2001 (age 25)	1.91 m	10	21	(Saudi Arabia) Al-Ahli
31	RB	Elyas Bouadjadja	21 April 2002 (age 24)	1.97 m	0	0	(France) Massy Essonne Handball
33	LW	Mounir Chehri	4 June 1999 (age 27)	1.79 m	0	0	(Norway) Halden Topphåndball
36	RB	Mohamed Hacene-Djaballah	18 April 1993 (age 33)	1.90 m	8	10	(Saudi Arabia) Al-Rawdhah
44	CB	Moustapha Hadj Sadok	17 August 1997 (age 29)	1.92 m	52	202	(Kuwait) Al-Nasr
63	GK	Salim Mezaza	26 January 2004 (age 22)	1.88 m	10	3	(Spain) CB Ciudad de Logroño
77	P	Islam Kaabeche	6 November 1998 (age 27)	1.95 m	0	0	(Algeria) JSE Skikda
87	RB	Ayoub Abdi	16 February 1997 (age 29)	1.97 m	50	269	(France) HBC Nantes
94	P	Bastien Khermouche	10 November 1993 (age 32)	1.92 m	23	45	(France) Dijon Métropole Handball
98	P	Abdeldjalil Zannadi	18 May 1998 (age 28)	1.98 m	17	22	(Hungary) Eger-Eszterházy SzSE

== See also ==
- Algerian Handball Federation
- Algeria women's national handball team
- Algeria men's national junior handball team
- Algeria women's national junior handball team
