= Mozambique women's national handball team =

Mozambique

Information
- Association: Federaçao Moçambicana de Andebol

Colours
1st	2nd

Results

African Championship
- Appearances: 2 (First in 1996)
- Best result: 5th (1998)
- Last updated on Unknown.

The Mozambique women's national handball team is the national team of Mozambique. It is governed by the Federaçao Moçambicana de Andebol and takes part in international handball competitions.

== African Championship record ==
- 1996 – 6th
- 1998 – 5th
