= Egypt men's national handball team =

Egypt

Information
- Nickname: The Pharaohs
- Association: Egyptian Handball Federation
- Coach: Xavier Pascual Fuertes
- Assistant coach: Fernando Barbeito; Mohamed Ramadan

Colours
1st	2nd

Results

Summer Olympics
- Appearances: 8 (First in 1992)
- Best result: 4th (2020)

World Championship
- Appearances: 19 (First in 1964)
- Best result: 4th (2001)

African Championship
- Appearances: 25 (First in 1979)
- Best result: (gold) (1991, 1992, 2000, 2004, 2008, 2016, 2020, 2022, 2024, 2026)
- Last updated on Unknown.

Egypt men's national handball team
Medal record

African Championship
Gold medal – first place	1991 Egypt	
Gold medal – first place	1992 Côte d'Ivoire	
Gold medal – first place	2000 Algeria	
Gold medal – first place	2004 Egypt	
Gold medal – first place	2008 Angola	
Gold medal – first place	2016 Egypt	
Gold medal – first place	2020 Tunisia	
Gold medal – first place	2022 Egypt	
Gold medal – first place	2024 Egypt	
Gold medal – first place	2026 Rwanda	
Silver medal – second place	1979 Republic of the Congo	
Silver medal – second place	1987 Morocco	
Silver medal – second place	1989 Algeria	
Silver medal – second place	2006 Tunisia	
Silver medal – second place	2010 Egypt	
Silver medal – second place	2018 Gabon	
Bronze medal – third place	1994 Tunisia	
Bronze medal – third place	1996 Benin	
Bronze medal – third place	1998 South Africa	
Bronze medal – third place	2002 Morocco	
Bronze medal – third place	2012 Morocco	
Bronze medal – third place	2014 Algeria	

Mediterranean Games
Gold medal – first place	2013 Mersin	
Gold medal – first place	2026 Taranto	
Silver medal – second place	1991 Athens	
Silver medal – second place	2022 Oran	

The Egypt men's national handball team is the national handball team of Egypt, which represents Egypt in international matches. It is supervised by the Egyptian Handball Federation. Egypt was the first non-European team to reach the semifinals of the World Championships, and the first African team to reach the semifinals in the Olympic tournament. Egypt national team has now the record of the most African Championships tied with Tunisia.

Egypt men handball team is widely regarded as the finest handball team in Africa.

== History ==
Egyptian Handball Federation old logo

Egypt's first appearance at the IHF World Championship was in 1964, where they failed to win a single game.

After Egypt started developing their handball infrastructure, Egypt qualified for the 1993 tournament at Sweden. They were able to win a game this time, against Czechoslovakia and they were able to qualify to the second round.

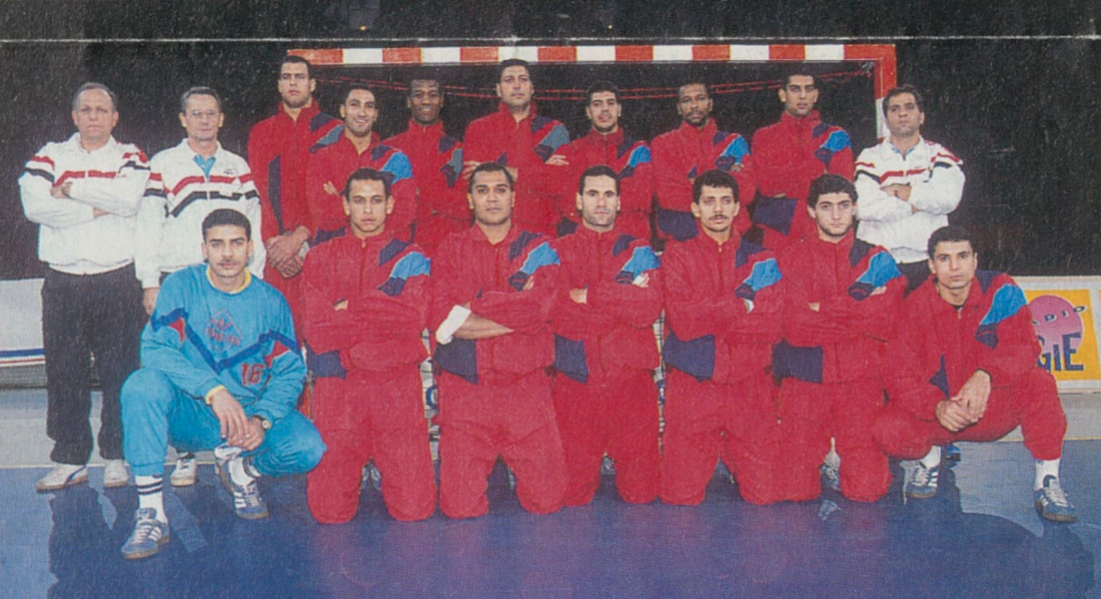
Egypt men's national handball team in 1992

Egypt's performance at the 1995 Championship rose Egypt to a respectable team. Egypt won all three matches in the first round, beating Brazil, Kuwait and Belarus. The team was widely expected not to survive the knockout stage, but beat four-time World Champions Romania in the round of 16. While they were later beaten at the quarterfinals against Croatia, the team was praised back home.

Egypt advanced to the quarterfinals every time between 1995 and 2001. They also reached 6th place at the 1996 Olympics and 7th at 2000. Egypt hosted the World Championship in 1999 for the first time, failing to reach the semi-finals after a loss against Russia.

In the 2001 IHF World Championship, Egypt beat Morocco, Portugal and Iceland, drew with the Czech Republic and lost to Sweden. At the knockout stage, Egypt beat fellow Africans, Algeria. At the quarterfinals, where Egypt has been knocked out three times prior, Egypt faced Russia again, winning the close game 21–19. After losses against France and Yugoslavia, Egypt placed fourth. This was the best performance by a non-European team until it was equaled by Tunisia in 2005 and beaten by Qatar in 2015.

Between 2003 and 2017, Egypt qualified to every tournament save for the 2012 Olympics, but failed to impress, never advancing to the quarterfinal. Egypt broke this streak at the 2019 World Championship, where they placed eighth. Egypt then went on to host the first 32-team Championship in 2021, finishing seventh after losing to reigning World Champions, Denmark on penalties, who later won the tournament.

Egypt beat their rivals Tunisia in their own court, qualifying to the 2020 Olympics. In the group stage, Egypt finished 2nd, after beating Portugal, Sweden, Bahrain and Japan, and losing to World Champions Denmark once again. They then won against Germany in the quarterfinals, progressing to the semifinals. They lost to France by a 4-goal margin, despite having had a 4-goal lead early on. In the Bronze Medal match, Egypt lost to Spain, placing 4th overall.

At the 2026 African Men's Handball Championship in Rwanda, Egypt secured its 10th continental title. In the final held on January 31, 2026, Egypt defeated Tunisia with a score of 37–24. This victory allowed Egypt to equal the Tunisian record for the most championships in the history of the competition.

Egyptian Handball Federation current logo

== Competitive record ==
Summer Olympics
Games	Round	Position	Pld	W	D	L	GF	GA	GD
(Germany) 1936 Berlin	Did not enter								
Handball Tournament not held from 1948 to 1968
(West Germany) 1972 Munich	Did not enter								
(Canada) 1976 Montreal	Did not enter								
(Soviet Union) 1980 Moscow	Did not enter								
(United States) 1984 Los Angeles	Did not enter								
(South Korea) 1988 Seoul	Did not enter								
(Spain) 1992 Barcelona	Match for 11th place	11th of 12	6	1	0	5	119	137	−18
(United States) 1996 Atlanta	Match for 5th place	6th of 12	6	3	0	3	139	132	+7
(Australia) 2000 Sydney	Match for 7th place	7th of 12	8	4	0	4	197	194	+3
(Greece) 2004 Athens	Match for 11th place	12th of 12	6	0	0	6	134	163	−29
(China) 2008 Beijing	Group Stage	10th of 12	5	0	2	3	127	132	−5
(United Kingdom) 2012 London	Did not qualify								
(Brazil) 2016 Rio de Janeiro	Group Stage	9th of 12	5	1	1	3	129	143	−14
(Japan) 2020 Tokyo	Bronze Medal Match	4th of 12	8	5	0	3	239	220	+19
(France) 2024 Paris	Quarter finals	5th of 12	6	3	1	2	176	169	+7
(United States) 2028 Los Angeles	TBD								
(Australia) 2032 Brisbane	TBD								
Total	Qualified: 8/15		50	17	4	29	1260	1290	−30

IHF World Men's Handball Championship
Games	Round	Position	Pld	W	D	L	GF	GA	GD
1938 Germany	Did not enter								
1954 Sweden	Did not enter								
1958 East Germany	Did not enter								
1961 West Germany	Did not enter								
1964 Czechoslovakia	Preliminary round	15th of 16	3	0	0	3	28	58	−30
1967 Sweden	Did not enter								
1970 France	Did not enter								
1974 East Germany	Did not enter								
1978 Denmark	Did not enter								
1982 West Germany	Did not enter								
1986 Switzerland	Did not enter								
1990 Czechoslovakia	Did not enter								
1993 Sweden	Match for 11th place	12th of 16	7	1	0	6	148	164	−16
1995 Iceland	Match for 5th place	6th of 24	9	5	0	4	211	214	−3
1997 Japan	Match for 5th place	6th of 24	9	6	1	2	220	186	+34
1999 Egypt	Match for 7th place	7th of 24	9	6	0	3	230	214	+16
2001 France	Bronze Medal Match	4th of 24	9	5	1	3	207	206	+1
2003 Portugal	Second round	15th of 24	7	2	1	4	177	197	−20
2005 Tunisia	Preliminary round	14th of 24	5	3	0	2	123	123	0
2007 Germany	Match for 17th place	17th of 24	6	2	0	4	168	173	−5
2009 Croatia	Match for 13th place	14th of 24	9	4	0	5	218	239	−21
2011 Sweden	Match for 13th place	14th of 24	7	2	0	5	172	193	−21
2013 Spain	Round of 16	16th of 24	6	1	1	4	156	154	+2
2015 Qatar	Round of 16	14th of 24	6	2	1	3	151	148	+3
2017 France	Round of 16	13th of 24	6	3	0	3	157	164	−7
/ 2019 Denmark/Germany	Match for 7th place	8th of 24	9	3	1	5	241	250	−9
2021 Egypt	Quarter finals	7th of 32	7	4	2	1	222	185	+37
/ 2023 Poland/Sweden	Match for 7th place	7th of 32	9	6	0	3	272	233	+39
// 2025 Croatia/Denmark/Norway	Quarter finals	5th of 32	7	5	0	2	216	183	+33
2027 Germany	Qualified								
/ 2029 France/Germany	TBD								
// 2031 Denmark/Iceland/Norway	TBD								
Total	Qualified: 19/30		130	60	8	62	3317	3284	+33

African Men's Handball Championship
Games	Round	Position	Pld	W	D	L	GF	GA	GD
1974 Tunisia	Did not enter								
1976 Algeria	Disqualified								
1979 People's Republic of the Congo	Final	Runners-up							
1981 Tunisia	Bronze Medal Match	4th of 8	5	3	0	2			
1983 Egypt	Bronze Medal Match	4th of 10	6	3	0	3			
1985 Angola	Bronze Medal Match	4th of 9	6	3	0	3	118	123	−5
1987 Morocco	Final	Runners-up	5	2	1	2	82	90	−8
1989 Algeria	Final	Runners-up	4	3	0	1	89	81	+8
1991 Egypt	Final	Champions	6	6	0	0	123	61	+62
1992 Ivory Coast	Final	Champions	4	4	0	0			
1994 Tunisia	Bronze Medal Match	3rd of 9	5	4	0	1			
1996 Benin	Bronze Medal Match	3rd of 10	6	4	0	2	146	112	+34
1998 South Africa	Bronze Medal Match	3rd of 10	6	5	0	1	210	117	+93
2000 Algeria	Final	Champions	6	6	0	0	175	100	+75
2002 Morocco	Bronze Medal Match	3rd of 12	5	4	0	1	142	106	+36
2004 Egypt	Final	Champions	7	7	0	0	250	147	+103
2006 Tunisia	Final	Runners-up	6	5	0	1	184	129	+55
2008 Angola	Final	Champions	5	5	0	0	152	117	+35
2010 Egypt	Final	Runners-up	7	6	0	1	208	144	+64
2012 Morocco	Bronze Medal Match	3rd of 12	8	6	1	1	239	161	+78
2014 Algeria	Bronze Medal Match	3rd of 12	8	6	0	2	217	166	+51
2016 Egypt	Final	Champions	8	8	0	0	233	139	+94
2018 Gabon	Final	Runners-up	7	6	0	1	213	164	+49
2020 Tunisia	Final	Champions	7	7	0	0	237	152	+85
2022 Egypt	Final	Champions	5	5	0	0	176	109	+67
2024 Egypt	Final	Champions	6	6	0	0	198	121	+77
2026 Rwanda	Final	Champions	7	7	0	0	290	166	+124
Total	Qualified: 25/27		145	121	2	22	3682	2505	+1177

=== All-Africa Games ===
- 1965 – (gold)
- 1973 – (silver)
- 1987 – (bronze)
- 1991 – (gold)
- 1995 – (gold)
- 1999 – (silver)
- 2003 – (gold)
- 2007 – (gold)
- 2011 – (gold)
- 2015 – (gold)
- 2019 – (silver)
- 2023 – (gold)

=== Mediterranean Games ===
- 1979 – 6th
- 1991 – (silver)
- 1993 – 4th
- 1997 – 6th
- 2005 – 5th
- 2013 – (gold)
- 2022 – (silver)
- 2026 – (gold)

=== Unofficial tournaments ===
==== MENA Games ====
- 1961 – (gold)
- 1965 – (gold)
- 1992 – (gold)
- 1999 – (gold)
- 2007 – (gold)
- 2011 – (gold)

==== Islamic Solidarity Games ====
- 2005 – (bronze)

== Team ==
=== Current squad ===
Roster for the 2025 World Men's Handball Championship.

Head coach: (Spain) Xavier Pascual Fuertes

No.	Pos.	Name	Date of birth (age)	Height	App.	Goals	Club
5	RB	Yahia Omar	9 September 1997 (age 29)	1.95 m	68	252	(France) Paris Saint-Germain
7	CB	Seif Hany	10 June 2000 (age 26)	1.84 m	0	0	(Egypt) Al Ahly
10	LB	Abdelrahman Abdou	30 January 1996 (age 30)	1.96 m	21	25	(France) Paris Saint-Germain
15	LB	Ahmed Hesham	15 May 2000 (age 26)	1.91 m	64	94	(Hungary) One Veszprém
17	CB	Ahmed Khairy	15 September 1994 (age 31)	1.88 m	20	21	(Egypt) Al Ahly
20	LW	Belal Massoud	8 February 2004 (age 22)	1.82 m	0	0	(Egypt) Al Ahly
21	P	Mohamed Tarek	15 January 2002 (age 24)	2.02 m	6	2	(Egypt) Zamalek
24	P	Ibrahim El-Masry	11 March 1989 (age 37)	1.96 m	274	84	(Egypt) Al Ahly
45	CB	Seif El-Deraa	19 September 1998 (age 27)	1.87 m	64	113	(Spain) FC Barcelona
53	RW	Akram Yosri	22 November 1994 (age 31)	1.80 m	54	152	(Egypt) Zamalek
55	RB	Mohsen Ramadan	11 March 1998 (age 28)	1.92 m	46	88	(Egypt) Al Ahly
74	P	Yasser Abdelwahed	8 December 2000 (age 25)	1.94 m	0	0	(Egypt) Al Ahly
79	LW	Ahmed Nafea	1 September 1997 (age 29)	1.82 m	5	32	(Serbia) RK Vojvodina
80	P	Ahmed Adel	25 November 1994 (age 31)	1.84 m	33	53	(Hungary) One Veszprém
88	GK	Karim Handawy	1 May 1988 (age 38)	1.88 m	181	2	(Egypt) Zamalek
90	LB	Ali Zein	14 December 1990 (age 35)	1.93 m	316	480	(Hungary) One Veszprém
91	RW	Mohamed Sanad	16 January 1991 (age 35)	1.88 m	177	430	(France) USAM Nîmes Gard
92	GK	Mohamed Aly	13 November 1992 (age 33)	1.90 m	21	0	(Portugal) Sporting CP

=== Notable former coaches ===
- (Serbia) Zoran Živković
- (Croatia) Irfan Smajlagić
- (Spain) David Davis
- (Spain) Roberto García Parrondo
- (Spain) Juan Carlos Pastor

== See also ==
- Dr. Hassan Moustafa
- Egypt men's national under-21 handball team
- Egypt men's national under-19 handball team
- Egypt men's national under-17 handball team
- Egypt men's national beach handball team
- Egypt national wheelchair handball team
