= Kenya women's national handball team =

Kenya

Information
- Association: Kenya Handball Federation
- Coach: Victor Ochieng Oduol

Colours
1st	2nd

Results

African Championship
- Appearances: 2 (First in 2021)
- Best result: 10th (2021)
- Last updated on Unknown.

The Kenya women's national handball team is the national team of Kenya. It is governed by the Kenya Handball Federation and takes part in international handball competitions.

== African Championship record ==
- 2021 – 10th place
- 2024 – 12th place
