= Algeria women's national handball team =

Algeria

Information
- Association: Algerian Handball Federation
- Coach: Abdelkrim Bendjemil

Colours
| 1st | 2nd |

Results

World Championship
- Appearances: 3 (First in 1978)
- Best result: 11th (1978)

African Championship
- Appearances: 19 (First in 1976)
- Best result: 2nd (1996)
- Last updated on Unknown.

The Algeria women's national handball team is the national team of Algeria. It is governed by the Algerian Handball Federation and takes part in international handball competitions.

== Results ==
=== World Championship ===
| Year | Position |
|---|---|
| (Socialist Federal Republic of Yugoslavia) 1957 | did not participate |
| (Romania) 1962 | did not participate |
| (West Germany) 1965 | did not participate |
| (Netherlands) 1971 | did not participate |
| (Socialist Federal Republic of Yugoslavia) 1973 | did not participate |
| (Soviet Union) 1975 | did not participate |
| (Czechoslovakia) 1978 | 11th place |
| (Hungary) 1982 | did not qualify |
| (Netherlands) 1986 | did not qualify |
| (South Korea) 1990 | did not qualify |
| (Norway) 1993 | did not qualify |
| (Austria) / (Hungary) 1995 | did not qualify |
| (Germany) 1997 | 19th place |
| (Denmark) / (Norway) 1999 | did not qualify |
| (Italy) 2001 | did not qualify |

| Year | Position |
|---|---|
| (Croatia) 2003 | did not qualify |
| (Russia) 2005 | did not qualify |
| (France) 2007 | did not qualify |
| (China) 2009 | did not qualify |
| (Brazil) 2011 | did not qualify |
| (Serbia) 2013 | 22nd place |
| (Denmark) 2015 | did not qualify |
| (Germany) 2017 | did not qualify |
| (Japan) 2019 | did not qualify |
| (Spain) 2021 | did not qualify |
| (Denmark) / (Norway) / (Sweden) 2023 | did not qualify |
| (Germany) / (Netherlands) 2025 | to be determined |
| (Hungary) 2027 | to be determined |
| (Spain) 2029 | to be determined |
| (Czech Republic) / (Poland) 2031 | to be determined |
| Total | 3/26 |

=== African Championship ===
| Year | Position |
|---|---|
| (Tunisia) 1974 | did not compete |
| (Algeria) 1976 | 3rd place |
| (Republic of the Congo) 1979 | 3rd place |
| (Tunisia) 1981 | 5th place |
| (Egypt) 1983 | 7th place |
| (Tunisia) 1985 | did not participate |
| (Morocco) 1987 | did not participate |
| (Algeria) 1989 | 4th place |
| (Egypt) 1991 | 4th place |
| (Ivory Coast) 1992 | 5th place |
| (Tunisia) 1994 | 3rd place |
| (Benin) 1996 | 2nd place |
| (South Africa) 1998 | did not compete |
| (Algeria) 2000 | 6th place |

| Year | Position |
|---|---|
| (Morocco) 2002 | 4th place |
| (Egypt) 2004 | did not participate |
| (Tunisia) 2006 | did not participate |
| (Angola) 2008 | 6th place |
| (Egypt) 2010 | 4th place |
| (Morocco) 2012 | 4th place |
| (Algeria) 2014 | 4th place |
| (Angola) 2016 | 6th place |
| (Republic of the Congo) 2018 | 8th place |
| (Cameroon) 2021 | withdrew |
| (Senegal) 2022 | 10th place |
| (Democratic Republic of the Congo) 2024 | 8th place |
| (Tunisia) 2026 | Qualified |
| Total | 20/27 |

=== African Games ===
| Year | Position |
|---|---|
| (Algeria) 1978 All-Africa Games | 1st place |
| (Kenya) 1987 All-Africa Games | did not participate |
| (Egypt) 1991 All-Africa Games | did not participate |
| (Zimbabwe) 1995 All-Africa Games | 4th place |
| (South Africa) 1999 All-Africa Games | 4th place |
| (Nigeria) 2003 All-Africa Games | 6th place |
| (Algeria) 2007 All-Africa Games | 7th place |
| (Mozambique) 2011 All-Africa Games | 4th place |
| (Republic of the Congo) 2015 Africa Games | did not participate |
| (Morocco) 2019 Africa Games | 6th place |
| Total | 7/10 |

=== Mediterranean Games ===
- 1979 – 4th
- 2022 – 8th
- 2026 – 4th

=== Pan Arab Games ===
- 1992 – 1st
- 1999 – 1st
- 2011 – 1st

== Squad ==
=== Current squad ===
The selected squad for the 2024 African Women's Handball Championship in Kinshasa from 27 November to 7 December 2024.

Head coach: Yacinn Bouakaz

| No. | Pos. | Name | Date of birth (age) | Height | App. | Goals | Club |
|---|---|---|---|---|---|---|---|
| | GK | Melissa Gouali | 3 May 2003 (age 23) | 1.76 m | | | (France) Stella Saint-Maur |
| | GK | Yousra Naili | | 1.75 m | | | (France) ES Colombienne |
| | GK | Meryem Gouttel | | | | | (Algeria) HBC El Biar |
| | | Wafa Harika | | | | | (Algeria) CF Boumerdes |
| | LW | Siwar Mazouz | 19 June 2004 (age 22) | 1.67 m | | | (France) Stella Saint-Maur |
| | RB | Sabrina Betzer | 5 May 1993 (age 33) | 1.74 m | | | (France) AS Cannes |
| | RB | Maya Fettani | 13 April 2005 (age 21) | 1.83 m | | | (France) Clermont Auvergne 63 |
| | RB | Ines Naceur | 24 May 2002 (age 24) | 1.74 m | | | (France) ASUL Vaulx-en-Velin |
| | CB | Sanae Naceur | 21 October 2006 (age 20) | 1.68 m | | | (France) ASUL Vaulx-en-Velin |
| | | Camélia Selmani | | | | | (France) AS Cannes |
| | LB | Soulaf Atmani | 31 May 2005 (age 21) | 1.75 m | | | (Algeria) NRKG Alger |
| | | Kenza Bouguerch | 29 December 2000 (age 25) | 1.78 m | | | (France) ASUL Vaulx-en-Velin |
| | | Imène Deraji | | | | | (Algeria) CF Boumerdes |
| | | Chaima Mokrani | | | | | (Algeria) HBC El Biar |
| | | Salma Benmoudether | | | | | (Algeria) CF Boumerdes |
| | | Kenza Makhloufi | 9 September 1997 (age 29) | | | | (Algeria) HBC El Biar |
| | | Mélissa Curabec | | | | | (France) USAM Nîmes Gard |
| | | Waffya Djabour | 29 March 1998 (age 28) | 1.75 m | | | (France) Clermont Auvergne 63 |
| | | Dounia Laâzizi | | | | | (Algeria) CF Boumerdes |
