= 2021 World Women's Handball Championship =

2021 edition of the World Women's Handball Championship

Tournament details
- Host country: Spain
- Venues: 4 (in 4 host cities)
- Dates: 1–19 December
- Teams: 32 (from 5 confederations)

Final positions
- Champions: Norway (4th title)
- Runners-up: France
- Third place: Denmark
- Fourth place: Spain

Tournament statistics
- Matches played: 105
- Goals scored: 5,873 (55.93 per match)
- Attendance: 119,041 (1,134 per match)
- Top scorer(s): (Sweden) Nathalie Hagman (71 goals)

Awards
- Best player: (Norway) Kari Brattset Dale

The 2021 IHF World Women's Handball Championship, the 25th event by the International Handball Federation, was held in Spain from 1 to 19 December 2021. On 18 October 2018, at a congress in Doha, Qatar, the IHF announced that the World Championship would be expanded from 24 teams to 32 teams from 2021 onwards.

The Netherlands were the defending champions after winning for the first time in 2019. However, they finished third in their main round group and failed to qualify for the quarterfinals.

Norway defeated France to win their fourth title. Denmark captured the bronze medal by winning against Spain.

== Bidding process ==
Spain and Hungary bid for the right to organise the 2021 Women's World Handball Championship. The International Handball Federation decided that the voting process would take place during the 2017 World Men's Handball Championship.

The Spanish bid included the following six host cities and venues:

Host city	Venue	Capacity
Barcelona	Palau Blaugrana	12,000
Granollers	Palau d'Esports de Granollers	5,200
Tarragona	Palacio de Deportes de Tarragona	5,000
Lleida	Pavelló Barris Nord	5,500
Castellón de la Plana	Pavelló Ciutat de Castelló	5,200
Badalona	Palau Municipal d'Esports de Badalona	12,500

The President of the Royal Spanish Handball Federation confirmed that full support is granted by the Olympic Movement, Spanish government and the handball community. The Spanish government guaranteed the introduction of all necessary measures so that the event could be celebrated in a full security setting, with special attention paid to key infrastructures for the staging of the competitions and to IHF operations, its subsidiaries and delegations from different countries.

The Hungarian bid included the following six host cities and venues:

Host city	Venue	Capacity
Veszprém	Veszprém Aréna	8,000
Győr	Audi Aréna	5,500
Szeged	Pick Aréna	8,000
Budapest	László Papp Budapest Sports Arena	12,000
Debrecen	Főnix Aréna	6,000
Tatabánya	Tatabányai Multifunkcionális Sportcsarnok	6,000

The 2021 Women's World Handball Championship was awarded to Spain by a secret ballot of members of the IHF Council.

== Venues ==
The tournament is being played in the following venues: Llíria, Torrevieja, Castelló and Granollers as the final four venue.

Granollers	Llíria
Palau d'Esports de Granollers; Capacity: 5,685	Poliesportiu Pla de L'Arc; Capacity: 4,200
2021 World Women's Handball Championship is located in Spain
Castelló	Torrevieja
Pabellón Ciutat de Castelló; Capacity: 5,263	Palacio de los Deportes de Torrevieja; Capacity: 4,500

== Qualification ==
Competition	Dates	Host	Vacancies	Qualified
Host nation	28 January 2017	France	1	Spain
2019 World Championship	30 November – 15 December 2019	Japan	1	Netherlands
2020 European Championship	3–20 December 2020	Denmark	4	Croatia; Denmark; France; Norway
European qualification	19 March – 21 April 2021	Various	10	Austria; Czech Republic; Germany; Hungary; Montenegro; Romania; Russia^{[1]} Serbia; Slovenia; Sweden
2021 African Championship	8–18 June 2021	Cameroon	4	Angola; Cameroon; Congo; Tunisia
2021 Nor.Ca. Women's Championship	22–25 August 2021	United States	1	Puerto Rico
2021 Asian Championship	15–25 September 2021	Jordan	5	Iran; Japan; Kazakhstan; South Korea; Uzbekistan
2021 South and Central American Championship	5–9 October 2021	Paraguay	3	Argentina; Brazil; Paraguay
Oceania	8 August 2021	N/A	0^{[2]}^{[3]}	None
Wild card	8 August 2021	N/A	2^{[2]}^{[3]}	Slovakia; Poland
Wild card	23 September 2021	N/A	1^{[4]}	China

1. On 9 December 2019, the World Anti-Doping Agency (WADA) banned Russia from all international sport for a period of four years, after the Russian government was found to have tampered with laboratory data that it provided to WADA in January 2019 as a condition of the Russian Anti-Doping Agency being reinstated. Russia later filed an appeal to the Court of Arbitration for Sport (CAS) against the WADA decision. After reviewing the case on appeal, CAS ruled on 17 December 2020 to reduce the penalty that WADA had placed on Russia. Instead of banning Russia from sporting events, the ruling allowed Russian sportspeople to participate at the Olympics and other international events, but for a period of two years, the team cannot use the Russian name, flag, or anthem and must present themselves as "Neutral Athlete" or "Neutral Team". The ruling does allow for team uniforms to display "Russia" on the uniform as well as the use of the Russian flag colors within the uniform's design, although the name should be up to equal predominance as the "Neutral Athlete/Team" designation. Like the men's team, the Russian women's team played under the alternative name of the sport's domestic governing body, the Russian Handball Federation.

2. Since 2018 countries from Oceania (Australia and New Zealand) are participating in the Asian Championships: if one of them finishes within the top five, it qualifies for the World Championship. Otherwise the place transfers to the wild card spot.

3. Since Oceania did not register a team for the upcoming Asian qualification event, the IHF Council awarded two Wild Cards for the 2021 IHF Women’s World Championship in Spain, namely to the National Federations of Slovakia and Poland.

4. As the 2021 Asian tournament was only played with 11 teams instead of 12, only five teams qualified and a wild card was granted to China.

== Qualified teams ==
Country	Qualified as	Qualification date	Previous appearances in tournament (Note: Bold indicates champion for that year, Italics indicates host for that year.)
Spain	Host	28 January 2017	10 (1993, 2001, 2003, 2007, 2009, 2011, 2013, 2015, 2017, 2019)
Netherlands	Defending world champion	15 December 2019	12 (1971, 1973, 1978, 1986, 1999, 2001, 2005, 2011, 2013, 2015, 2017, **2019**)
Norway	Semifinalist of 2020 European Championship	12 December 2020	20 (1971, 1973, 1975, 1982, 1986, 1990, 1993, 1995, 1997, **1999**, 2001, 2003, 2005, 2007, 2009, **2011**, 2013, **2015**, 2017, 2019)
France	Semifinalist of 2020 European Championship	15 December 2020	14 (1986, 1990, 1997, 1999, 2001, **2003**, 2005, 2007, 2009, 2011, 2013, 2015, **2017**, 2019)
Croatia	Semifinalist of 2020 European Championship	15 December 2020	6 (1995, 1997, 2003, 2005, 2007, 2011)
Denmark	Semifinalist of 2020 European Championship	15 December 2020	20 (1957, 1962, 1965, 1971, 1973, 1975, 1990, 1993, 1995, **1997**, 1999, 2001, 2003, 2005, 2009, 2011, 2013, 2015, 2017, 2019)
Hungary	European playoff winner	18 April 2021	22 (1957, 1962, **1965**, 1971, 1973, 1975, 1978, 1982, 1986, 1993, 1995, 1997, 1999, 2001, 2003, 2005, 2007, 2009, 2013, 2015, 2017, 2019)
Montenegro	European playoff winner	20 April 2021	5 (2011, 2013, 2015, 2017, 2019)
Germany	European playoff winner	20 April 2021	13 (**1993**, 1995, 1997, 1999, 2003, 2005, 2007, 2009, 2011, 2013, 2015, 2017, 2019)
Austria	European playoff winner	20 April 2021	12 (1957, 1986, 1990, 1993, 1995, 1997, 1999, 2001, 2003, 2005, 2007, 2009)
Russian Handball Federation	European playoff winner	20 April 2021	13 (1993, 1995, 1997, 1999, **2001**, 2003, **2005**, **2007**, **2009**, 2011, 2015, 2017, 2019) (Note: Participated as Russia in 1993–2019.)
Czech Republic	European playoff winner	20 April 2021	6 (1995, 1997, 1999, 2003, 2013, 2017)
Romania	European playoff winner	21 April 2021	24 (1957, **1962**, 1965, 1971, 1973, 1975, 1978, 1982, 1986, 1990, 1993, 1995, 1997, 1999, 2001, 2003, 2005, 2007, 2009, 2011, 2013, 2015, 2017, 2019)
Serbia	European playoff winner	21 April 2021	4 (2013, 2015, 2017, 2019)
Sweden	European playoff winner	21 April 2021	10 (1957, 1990, 1993, 1995, 2001, 2009, 2011, 2015, 2017, 2019)
Slovenia	European playoff winner	21 April 2021	6 (1997, 2001, 2003, 2005, 2017, 2019)
Angola	Semifinalist of 2021 African Championship	15 June 2021	15 (1990, 1993, 1995, 1997, 1999, 2001, 2003, 2005, 2007, 2009, 2011, 2013, 2015, 2017, 2019)
Tunisia	Semifinalist of 2021 African Championship	15 June 2021	9 (1975, 2001, 2003, 2007, 2009, 2011, 2013, 2015, 2017)
Congo	Semifinalist of 2021 African Championship	15 June 2021	5 (1982, 1999, 2001, 2007, 2009)
Cameroon	Semifinalist of 2021 African Championship	15 June 2021	2 (2005, 2017)
Slovakia	Wild card	8 August 2021	1 (1995)
Poland	Wild card	8 August 2021	16 (1957, 1962, 1965, 1973, 1975, 1978, 1986, 1990, 1993, 1997, 1999, 2005, 2007, 2013, 2015, 2017)
Puerto Rico	Winner of Nor.Ca Championship	25 August 2021	1 (2015)
Kazakhstan	Top five of 2021 Asian Championship	19 September 2021	5 (2007, 2009, 2011, 2015, 2019)
South Korea	Top five of 2021 Asian Championship	19 September 2021	18 (1978, 1982, 1986, 1990, 1993, **1995**, 1997, 1999, 2001, 2003, 2005, 2007, 2009, 2011, 2013, 2015, 2017, 2019)
Iran	Top five of 2021 Asian Championship	21 September 2021	0 (Debut)
Japan	Top five of 2021 Asian Championship	21 September 2021	19 (1962, 1965, 1971, 1973, 1975, 1986, 1995, 1997, 1999, 2001, 2003, 2005, 2007, 2009, 2011, 2013, 2015, 2017, 2019)
China	Wild card	23 September 2021	16 (1986, 1990, 1993, 1995, 1997, 1999, 2001, 2003, 2005, 2007, 2009, 2011, 2013, 2015, 2017, 2019)
Uzbekistan	Top five of 2021 Asian Championship	25 September 2021	1 (1997)
Argentina	Top three of 2021 Central and South American Championship	7 October 2021	10 (1999, 2003, 2005, 2007, 2009, 2011, 2013, 2015, 2017, 2019)
Brazil	Top three of 2021 Central and South American Championship	7 October 2021	13 (1995, 1997, 1999, 2001, 2003, 2005, 2007, 2009, 2011, **2013**, 2015, 2017, 2019)
Paraguay	Top three of 2021 Central and South American Championship	9 October 2021	3 (2007, 2013, 2017)

== Draw ==
The draw took place on 12 August 2021 at 22:00 in Castellón, Spain.

=== Seeding ===
The seeding was announced on 8 August 2021. As organizer, Spain had the right to choose their group. The Asian, North and South American teams were not known at the time of the draw.

Pot 1	Pot 2	Pot 3	Pot 4
Netherlands; Norway; Spain; France; Croatia; Denmark; Russian Handball Federation; Germany	Montenegro; Hungary; Sweden; South Korea; Japan; Romania; Serbia; Austria	Angola; Brazil; Argentina; Cameroon; Czech Republic; Tunisia; Puerto Rico; Kazakhstan	Iran; Slovakia; Slovenia; Uzbekistan; China; Congo; Paraguay; Poland

== Referees ==
18 referee pairs were selected on 12 October 2021.

Referees
Algeria	Yousef Belkhiri; Sid Ali Hamidi
Argentina	María Paolantoni; Mariana García
Bosnia and Herzegovina	Amar Konjičanin; Dino Konjičanin
Croatia	Davor Lončar; Zoran Lončar
Denmark	Karina Christiansen; Line Hansen
Egypt	Yasmina El-Saied; Heidy El-Saied
France	Karim Gasmi; Raouf Gasmi
Germany	Maike Merz; Tanja Kuttler
Moldova	Alexei Covalciuc; Igor Covalciuc

Referees
Montenegro	Novica Mitrović; Miljan Vešović
Portugal	Marta Sá; Vânia Sá
Romania	Cristina Năstase; Simona Stancu
Russia	Viktoria Alpaidze; Tatiana Berezkina
Serbia	Marko Sekulić; Vladimir Jovandić
South Korea	Koo Bo-ok; Lee Se-ok
Spain	Javier Álvarez; Ion Bustamante
Tunisia	Samir Krichen; Samir Makhlouf
Turkey	Kürşad Erdoğan; İbrahim Özdeniz

== Squads ==
Each team consists of up to 18 players, of whom 16 may be fielded for each match.

== Preliminary round ==
All times are local (UTC+1).

=== Group A ===
Pos	Team	Pld	W	D	L	GF	GA	GD	Pts	Qualification
1	France	3	3	0	0	83	57	+26	6	Main round
2	Slovenia	3	1	1	1	71	72	−1	3	Main round
3	Montenegro	3	1	0	2	67	72	−5	2	Main round
4	Angola	3	0	1	2	65	85	−20	1	Presidents Cup

Source: IHF
Rules for classification: 1) points; 2) head-to-head points; 3) head-to-head goal difference; 4) head-to-head number of goals scored; 5) goal difference.

3 December 2021; 18:00	France	30–20	Angola	Palau d'Esports de Granollers, Granollers; Attendance: 791; Referees: Lončar, Lončar (CRO)
3 December 2021; 18:00	Foppa, Granier 4	(13–9)	Venâncio 5	Palau d'Esports de Granollers, Granollers; Attendance: 791; Referees: Lončar, Lončar (CRO)
3 December 2021; 18:00	4× (suspension)	Report	1× (yellow card) 7× (suspension)	Palau d'Esports de Granollers, Granollers; Attendance: 791; Referees: Lončar, Lončar (CRO)

3 December 2021; 20:30	Montenegro	18–28	Slovenia	Palau d'Esports de Granollers, Granollers; Attendance: 1,007; Referees: Álvarez, Bustamante (ESP)
3 December 2021; 20:30	Radičević 7	(8–16)	Gros 6	Palau d'Esports de Granollers, Granollers; Attendance: 1,007; Referees: Álvarez, Bustamante (ESP)
3 December 2021; 20:30	1× (yellow card) 4× (suspension)	Report	5× (suspension)	Palau d'Esports de Granollers, Granollers; Attendance: 1,007; Referees: Álvarez, Bustamante (ESP)

5 December 2021; 18:00	Slovenia	18–29	France	Palau d'Esports de Granollers, Granollers; Attendance: 1,211; Referees: Sá, Sá (POR)
5 December 2021; 18:00	Varagić 6	(8–13)	Nze Minko 6	Palau d'Esports de Granollers, Granollers; Attendance: 1,211; Referees: Sá, Sá (POR)
5 December 2021; 18:00	1× (yellow card) 5× (suspension)	Report	1× (yellow card) 3× (suspension)	Palau d'Esports de Granollers, Granollers; Attendance: 1,211; Referees: Sá, Sá (POR)

5 December 2021; 20:30	Montenegro	30–20	Angola	Palau d'Esports de Granollers, Granollers; Attendance: 1,310; Referees: García, Paolantoni (ARG)
5 December 2021; 20:30	Radičević 12	(11–9)	Guialo 6	Palau d'Esports de Granollers, Granollers; Attendance: 1,310; Referees: García, Paolantoni (ARG)
5 December 2021; 20:30	1× (yellow card) 2× (suspension)	Report	2× (suspension) 1× (red card)	Palau d'Esports de Granollers, Granollers; Attendance: 1,310; Referees: García, Paolantoni (ARG)

7 December 2021; 18:00	Angola	25–25	Slovenia	Palau d'Esports de Granollers, Granollers; Attendance: 1,450; Referees: Stancu, Lovin (ROU)
7 December 2021; 18:00	Pascoal 7	(14–13)	Gros 12	Palau d'Esports de Granollers, Granollers; Attendance: 1,450; Referees: Stancu, Lovin (ROU)
7 December 2021; 18:00	2× (suspension)	Report	1× (yellow card) 2× (suspension)	Palau d'Esports de Granollers, Granollers; Attendance: 1,450; Referees: Stancu, Lovin (ROU)

7 December 2021; 20:30	France	24–19	Montenegro	Palau d'Esports de Granollers, Granollers; Attendance: 2,481; Referees: Belkhiri, Hamidi (ALG)
7 December 2021; 20:30	Lassource 6	(12–12)	Radičević 7	Palau d'Esports de Granollers, Granollers; Attendance: 2,481; Referees: Belkhiri, Hamidi (ALG)
7 December 2021; 20:30	3× (yellow card) 2× (suspension)	Report	1× (yellow card) 4× (suspension) 1× (red card)	Palau d'Esports de Granollers, Granollers; Attendance: 2,481; Referees: Belkhiri, Hamidi (ALG)

=== Group B ===
Pos	Team	Pld	W	D	L	GF	GA	GD	Pts	Qualification
1	Russian Handball Federation	3	3	0	0	98	63	+35	6	Main round
2	Serbia	3	2	0	1	90	71	+19	4	Main round
3	Poland	3	1	0	2	77	70	+7	2	Main round
4	Cameroon	3	0	0	3	55	116	−61	0	Presidents Cup

Source: IHF
Rules for classification: 1) points; 2) head-to-head points; 3) head-to-head goal difference; 4) head-to-head number of goals scored; 5) goal difference.

3 December 2021; 18:00	Russian Handball Federation	40–18	Cameroon	Poliesportiu Pla de L'Arc, Llíria; Attendance: 690; Referees: Koo, Lee (KOR)
3 December 2021; 18:00	Markova 6	(17–10)	Ekoh 4	Poliesportiu Pla de L'Arc, Llíria; Attendance: 690; Referees: Koo, Lee (KOR)
3 December 2021; 18:00	3× (suspension)	Report	3× (suspension)	Poliesportiu Pla de L'Arc, Llíria; Attendance: 690; Referees: Koo, Lee (KOR)

3 December 2021; 20:30	Serbia	25–21	Poland	Poliesportiu Pla de L'Arc, Llíria; Attendance: 1,067; Referees: Gasmi, Gasmi (FRA)
3 December 2021; 20:30	Janjušević 7	(16–13)	Rosiak 6	Poliesportiu Pla de L'Arc, Llíria; Attendance: 1,067; Referees: Gasmi, Gasmi (FRA)
3 December 2021; 20:30	1× (yellow card) 4× (suspension)	Report	2× (yellow card) 4× (suspension)	Poliesportiu Pla de L'Arc, Llíria; Attendance: 1,067; Referees: Gasmi, Gasmi (FRA)

5 December 2021; 18:00	Poland	23–26	Russian Handball Federation	Poliesportiu Pla de L'Arc, Llíria; Attendance: 1,166; Referees: Christiansen, Hansen (DEN)
5 December 2021; 18:00	Rosiak 8	(10–16)	Ilina 8	Poliesportiu Pla de L'Arc, Llíria; Attendance: 1,166; Referees: Christiansen, Hansen (DEN)
5 December 2021; 18:00	2× (yellow card) 2× (suspension)	Report	1× (yellow card) 3× (suspension)	Poliesportiu Pla de L'Arc, Llíria; Attendance: 1,166; Referees: Christiansen, Hansen (DEN)

5 December 2021; 20:30	Serbia	43–18	Cameroon	Poliesportiu Pla de L'Arc, Llíria; Attendance: 1,086; Referees: Belkhiri, Hamidi (ALG)
5 December 2021; 20:30	M. Agbaba 7	(19–9)	Ekoh 7	Poliesportiu Pla de L'Arc, Llíria; Attendance: 1,086; Referees: Belkhiri, Hamidi (ALG)
5 December 2021; 20:30	1× (yellow card) 1× (suspension)	Report	1× (yellow card) 6× (suspension)	Poliesportiu Pla de L'Arc, Llíria; Attendance: 1,086; Referees: Belkhiri, Hamidi (ALG)

7 December 2021; 18:00	Cameroon	19–33	Poland	Poliesportiu Pla de L'Arc, Llíria; Attendance: 1,179; Referees: Sá, Sá (POR)
7 December 2021; 18:00	Ekoh 9	(7–16)	Roszak 9	Poliesportiu Pla de L'Arc, Llíria; Attendance: 1,179; Referees: Sá, Sá (POR)
7 December 2021; 18:00	6× (suspension)	Report	4× (suspension)	Poliesportiu Pla de L'Arc, Llíria; Attendance: 1,179; Referees: Sá, Sá (POR)

7 December 2021; 20:30	Russian Handball Federation	32–22	Serbia	Poliesportiu Pla de L'Arc, Llíria; Attendance: 1,500; Referees: Merz, Kuttler (GER)
7 December 2021; 20:30	Managarova 7	(15–9)	Radojević, Stoiljković 4	Poliesportiu Pla de L'Arc, Llíria; Attendance: 1,500; Referees: Merz, Kuttler (GER)
7 December 2021; 20:30	3× (suspension)	Report	1× (yellow card) 4× (suspension) 1× (red card)	Poliesportiu Pla de L'Arc, Llíria; Attendance: 1,500; Referees: Merz, Kuttler (GER)

=== Group C ===
Pos	Team	Pld	W	D	L	GF	GA	GD	Pts	Qualification
1	Norway	3	3	0	0	120	49	+71	6	Main round
2	Romania	3	2	0	1	99	61	+38	4	Main round
3	Kazakhstan	3	1	0	2	66	109	−43	2	Main round
4	Iran	3	0	0	3	45	111	−66	0	Presidents Cup

Source: IHF
Rules for classification: 1) points; 2) head-to-head points; 3) head-to-head goal difference; 4) head-to-head number of goals scored; 5) goal difference.

3 December 2021; 18:00	Romania	39–11	Iran	Pabellón Ciutat de Castelló, Castelló; Attendance: 600; Referees: Alpaidze, Berezkina (RUS)
3 December 2021; 18:00	Dincă, Laslo 6	(20–3)	Vatanparast 6	Pabellón Ciutat de Castelló, Castelló; Attendance: 600; Referees: Alpaidze, Berezkina (RUS)
3 December 2021; 18:00	1× (yellow card)	Report	1× (yellow card) 2× (suspension)	Pabellón Ciutat de Castelló, Castelló; Attendance: 600; Referees: Alpaidze, Berezkina (RUS)

3 December 2021; 20:30	Norway	46–18	Kazakhstan	Pabellón Ciutat de Castelló, Castelló; Attendance: 900; Referees: Erdoğan, Özdeniz (TUR)
3 December 2021; 20:30	Hovden 7	(24–10)	Alexandrova 7	Pabellón Ciutat de Castelló, Castelló; Attendance: 900; Referees: Erdoğan, Özdeniz (TUR)
3 December 2021; 20:30	1× (yellow card) 3× (suspension)	Report		Pabellón Ciutat de Castelló, Castelló; Attendance: 900; Referees: Erdoğan, Özdeniz (TUR)

5 December 2021; 18:00	Romania	38–17	Kazakhstan	Pabellón Ciutat de Castelló, Castelló; Attendance: 1,200; Referees: El-Saied, El-Saied (EGY)
5 December 2021; 18:00	Moisă 6	(14–9)	Alexandrova 8	Pabellón Ciutat de Castelló, Castelló; Attendance: 1,200; Referees: El-Saied, El-Saied (EGY)
5 December 2021; 18:00	3× (suspension)	Report	1× (yellow card) 1× (suspension)	Pabellón Ciutat de Castelló, Castelló; Attendance: 1,200; Referees: El-Saied, El-Saied (EGY)

5 December 2021; 20:30	Iran	9–41	Norway	Pabellón Ciutat de Castelló, Castelló; Attendance: 850; Referees: Konjičanin, Konjičanin (BIH)
5 December 2021; 20:30	three players 2	(3–22)	Røsberg Jacobsen 7	Pabellón Ciutat de Castelló, Castelló; Attendance: 850; Referees: Konjičanin, Konjičanin (BIH)
5 December 2021; 20:30	3× (suspension)	Report	1× (suspension)	Pabellón Ciutat de Castelló, Castelló; Attendance: 850; Referees: Konjičanin, Konjičanin (BIH)

7 December 2021; 18:00	Kazakhstan	31–25	Iran	Pabellón Ciutat de Castelló, Castelló; Attendance: 1,400; Referees: García, Paolantoni (ARG)
7 December 2021; 18:00	Alexandrova 8	(14–10)	Kianiara 6	Pabellón Ciutat de Castelló, Castelló; Attendance: 1,400; Referees: García, Paolantoni (ARG)
7 December 2021; 18:00	6× (suspension)	Report	4× (suspension)	Pabellón Ciutat de Castelló, Castelló; Attendance: 1,400; Referees: García, Paolantoni (ARG)

7 December 2021; 20:30	Norway	33–22	Romania	Pabellón Ciutat de Castelló, Castelló; Attendance: 3,200; Referees: Mitrović, Vešović (MNE)
7 December 2021; 20:30	Brattset Dale 7	(17–11)	Laslo 6	Pabellón Ciutat de Castelló, Castelló; Attendance: 3,200; Referees: Mitrović, Vešović (MNE)
7 December 2021; 20:30	2× (yellow card) 2× (suspension)	Report	2× (yellow card) 4× (suspension)	Pabellón Ciutat de Castelló, Castelló; Attendance: 3,200; Referees: Mitrović, Vešović (MNE)

=== Group D ===
Pos	Team	Pld	W	D	L	GF	GA	GD	Pts	Qualification
1	Netherlands	3	2	1	0	144	63	+81	5 (Note: Netherlands 31–31 Sweden)	Main round
2	Sweden	3	2	1	0	125	56	+69	5	Main round
3	Puerto Rico	3	1	0	2	55	127	−72	2	Main round
4	Uzbekistan	3	0	0	3	56	134	−78	0	Presidents Cup

Source: IHF
Rules for classification: 1) points; 2) head-to-head points; 3) head-to-head goal difference; 4) head-to-head number of goals scored; 5) goal difference.
Notes:

3 December 2021; 18:00	Netherlands	55–15	Puerto Rico	Palacio de los Deportes de Torrevieja, Torrevieja; Attendance: 548; Referees: Covalciuc, Covalciuc (MDA)
3 December 2021; 18:00	Vollebregt, Van Wetering 8	(23–6)	Ceballos 5	Palacio de los Deportes de Torrevieja, Torrevieja; Attendance: 548; Referees: Covalciuc, Covalciuc (MDA)
3 December 2021; 18:00	1× (yellow card) 1× (suspension)	Report		Palacio de los Deportes de Torrevieja, Torrevieja; Attendance: 548; Referees: Covalciuc, Covalciuc (MDA)

3 December 2021; 20:30	Sweden	46–15	Uzbekistan	Palacio de los Deportes de Torrevieja, Torrevieja; Attendance: 1,138; Referees: Sekulić, Jovandić (SRB)
3 December 2021; 20:30	Lerby 6	(22–11)	Khudoykulova, Razakbergenova 3	Palacio de los Deportes de Torrevieja, Torrevieja; Attendance: 1,138; Referees: Sekulić, Jovandić (SRB)
3 December 2021; 20:30	1× (yellow card)	Report	1× (red card)	Palacio de los Deportes de Torrevieja, Torrevieja; Attendance: 1,138; Referees: Sekulić, Jovandić (SRB)

5 December 2021; 15:30	Sweden	48–10	Puerto Rico	Palacio de los Deportes de Torrevieja, Torrevieja; Attendance: 907; Referees: Kuttler, Merz (GER)
5 December 2021; 15:30	Hagman 19	(26–5)	Ceballos 3	Palacio de los Deportes de Torrevieja, Torrevieja; Attendance: 907; Referees: Kuttler, Merz (GER)
5 December 2021; 15:30	2× (yellow card) 4× (suspension) 1× (red card)	Report	5× (suspension)	Palacio de los Deportes de Torrevieja, Torrevieja; Attendance: 907; Referees: Kuttler, Merz (GER)

5 December 2021; 18:00	Uzbekistan	17–58	Netherlands	Palacio de los Deportes de Torrevieja, Torrevieja; Attendance: 1,009; Referees: Mitrović, Vešović (MNE)
5 December 2021; 18:00	Abdumannonova, Bahromova 4	(10–28)	Bont, Nüsser 7	Palacio de los Deportes de Torrevieja, Torrevieja; Attendance: 1,009; Referees: Mitrović, Vešović (MNE)
5 December 2021; 18:00	4× (suspension)	Report	1× (yellow card) 1× (suspension)	Palacio de los Deportes de Torrevieja, Torrevieja; Attendance: 1,009; Referees: Mitrović, Vešović (MNE)

7 December 2021; 18:00	Puerto Rico	30–24	Uzbekistan	Palacio de los Deportes de Torrevieja, Torrevieja; Attendance: 571; Referees: Krichen, Makhlouf (TUN)
7 December 2021; 18:00	Ceballos 9	(14–12)	Khudoykulova 10	Palacio de los Deportes de Torrevieja, Torrevieja; Attendance: 571; Referees: Krichen, Makhlouf (TUN)
7 December 2021; 18:00	2× (yellow card) 4× (suspension)	Report	1× (yellow card) 2× (suspension)	Palacio de los Deportes de Torrevieja, Torrevieja; Attendance: 571; Referees: Krichen, Makhlouf (TUN)

7 December 2021; 20:30	Netherlands	31–31	Sweden	Palacio de los Deportes de Torrevieja, Torrevieja; Attendance: 1,825; Referees: Konjičanin, Konjičanin (BIH)
7 December 2021; 20:30	Bont 6	(17–18)	Roberts 8	Palacio de los Deportes de Torrevieja, Torrevieja; Attendance: 1,825; Referees: Konjičanin, Konjičanin (BIH)
7 December 2021; 20:30	3× (suspension)	Report	3× (suspension)	Palacio de los Deportes de Torrevieja, Torrevieja; Attendance: 1,825; Referees: Konjičanin, Konjičanin (BIH)

=== Group E ===
Pos	Team	Pld	W	D	L	GF	GA	GD	Pts	Qualification
1	Germany	3	3	0	0	92	67	+25	6	Main round
2	Hungary	3	2	0	1	91	83	+8	4	Main round
3	Czech Republic	3	1	0	2	74	86	−12	2	Main round
4	Slovakia	3	0	0	3	74	95	−21	0	Presidents Cup

Source: IHF
Rules for classification: 1) points; 2) head-to-head points; 3) head-to-head goal difference; 4) head-to-head number of goals scored; 5) goal difference.

2 December 2021; 18:00	Germany	31–21	Czech Republic	Poliesportiu Pla de L'Arc, Llíria; Attendance: 375; Referees: Belkhiri, Hamidi (ALG)
2 December 2021; 18:00	Maidhof 5	(17–10)	three players 4	Poliesportiu Pla de L'Arc, Llíria; Attendance: 375; Referees: Belkhiri, Hamidi (ALG)
2 December 2021; 18:00	1× (yellow card) 3× (suspension)	Report	3× (suspension) 1× (red card)	Poliesportiu Pla de L'Arc, Llíria; Attendance: 375; Referees: Belkhiri, Hamidi (ALG)

2 December 2021; 20:30	Hungary	35–29	Slovakia	Poliesportiu Pla de L'Arc, Llíria; Attendance: 448; Referees: Christiansen, Hansen (DEN)
2 December 2021; 20:30	Háfra, Klujber 7	(16–16)	Bíziková 8	Poliesportiu Pla de L'Arc, Llíria; Attendance: 448; Referees: Christiansen, Hansen (DEN)
2 December 2021; 20:30	2× (suspension)	Report	3× (suspension)	Poliesportiu Pla de L'Arc, Llíria; Attendance: 448; Referees: Christiansen, Hansen (DEN)

4 December 2021; 18:00	Slovakia	22–36	Germany	Poliesportiu Pla de L'Arc, Llíria; Attendance: 1,144; Referees: Koo, Lee (KOR)
4 December 2021; 18:00	Bajčiová, Bíziková 4	(12–17)	Grijseels 6	Poliesportiu Pla de L'Arc, Llíria; Attendance: 1,144; Referees: Koo, Lee (KOR)
4 December 2021; 18:00	3× (suspension)	Report	3× (suspension)	Poliesportiu Pla de L'Arc, Llíria; Attendance: 1,144; Referees: Koo, Lee (KOR)

4 December 2021; 20:30	Hungary	32–29	Czech Republic	Poliesportiu Pla de L'Arc, Llíria; Attendance: 1,145; Referees: Gasmi, Gasmi (FRA)
4 December 2021; 20:30	Klujber 11	(17–15)	Jeřábková 10	Poliesportiu Pla de L'Arc, Llíria; Attendance: 1,145; Referees: Gasmi, Gasmi (FRA)
4 December 2021; 20:30	2× (yellow card) 7× (suspension)	Report	2× (yellow card) 2× (suspension)	Poliesportiu Pla de L'Arc, Llíria; Attendance: 1,145; Referees: Gasmi, Gasmi (FRA)

6 December 2021; 18:00	Czech Republic	24–23	Slovakia	Poliesportiu Pla de L'Arc, Llíria; Attendance: 1,294; Referees: Erdoğan, Özdeniz (TUR)
6 December 2021; 18:00	Jeřábková, Zachová 4	(15–14)	Lancz 5	Poliesportiu Pla de L'Arc, Llíria; Attendance: 1,294; Referees: Erdoğan, Özdeniz (TUR)
6 December 2021; 18:00	3× (suspension) 1× (red card)	Report	2× (yellow card) 2× (suspension) 1× (red card)	Poliesportiu Pla de L'Arc, Llíria; Attendance: 1,294; Referees: Erdoğan, Özdeniz (TUR)

6 December 2021; 20:30	Germany	25–24	Hungary	Poliesportiu Pla de L'Arc, Llíria; Attendance: 2,053; Referees: Álvarez, Bustamante (ESP)
6 December 2021; 20:30	Maidhof, Schmelzer 5	(14–9)	Lukács 5	Poliesportiu Pla de L'Arc, Llíria; Attendance: 2,053; Referees: Álvarez, Bustamante (ESP)
6 December 2021; 20:30	1× (yellow card) 3× (suspension)	Report	3× (suspension)	Poliesportiu Pla de L'Arc, Llíria; Attendance: 2,053; Referees: Álvarez, Bustamante (ESP)

=== Group F ===
Pos	Team	Pld	W	D	L	GF	GA	GD	Pts	Qualification
1	Denmark	3	3	0	0	103	57	+46	6	Main round
2	South Korea	3	2	0	1	91	87	+4	4	Main round
3	Congo	3	1	0	2	74	94	−20	2	Main round
4	Tunisia	3	0	0	3	69	99	−30	0	Presidents Cup

Source: IHF
Rules for classification: 1) points; 2) head-to-head points; 3) head-to-head goal difference; 4) head-to-head number of goals scored; 5) goal difference.

2 December 2021; 18:00	South Korea	37–23	Congo	Palau d'Esports de Granollers, Granollers; Attendance: 641; Referees: García, Paolantoni (ARG)
2 December 2021; 18:00	Kim S. 6	(22–11)	Nkou 5	Palau d'Esports de Granollers, Granollers; Attendance: 641; Referees: García, Paolantoni (ARG)
2 December 2021; 18:00	1× (yellow card) 3× (suspension)	Report	3× (suspension)	Palau d'Esports de Granollers, Granollers; Attendance: 641; Referees: García, Paolantoni (ARG)

2 December 2021; 20:30	Denmark	35–16	Tunisia	Palau d'Esports de Granollers, Granollers; Attendance: 727; Referees: Sá, Sá (POR)
2 December 2021; 20:30	Heindahl 6	(16–8)	Amiche 4	Palau d'Esports de Granollers, Granollers; Attendance: 727; Referees: Sá, Sá (POR)
2 December 2021; 20:30	5× (suspension)	Report	3× (suspension)	Palau d'Esports de Granollers, Granollers; Attendance: 727; Referees: Sá, Sá (POR)

4 December 2021; 18:00	South Korea	31–29	Tunisia	Palau d'Esports de Granollers, Granollers; Attendance: 491; Referees: Stancu, Lovin (ROU)
4 December 2021; 18:00	Ryu 7	(14–14)	Rezgui 6	Palau d'Esports de Granollers, Granollers; Attendance: 491; Referees: Stancu, Lovin (ROU)
4 December 2021; 18:00	4× (suspension)	Report	2× (suspension)	Palau d'Esports de Granollers, Granollers; Attendance: 491; Referees: Stancu, Lovin (ROU)

4 December 2021; 20:30	Congo	18–33	Denmark	Palau d'Esports de Granollers, Granollers; Attendance: 611; Referees: Lončar, Lončar (CRO)
4 December 2021; 20:30	Ngombele 5	(7–18)	Nolsøe 6	Palau d'Esports de Granollers, Granollers; Attendance: 611; Referees: Lončar, Lončar (CRO)
4 December 2021; 20:30	4× (suspension)	Report	5× (suspension)	Palau d'Esports de Granollers, Granollers; Attendance: 611; Referees: Lončar, Lončar (CRO)

6 December 2021; 18:00	Tunisia	24–33	Congo	Palau d'Esports de Granollers, Granollers; Attendance: 972; Referees: Covalciuc, Covalciuc (MDA)
6 December 2021; 18:00	Hachana 7	(9–18)	Yimga 11	Palau d'Esports de Granollers, Granollers; Attendance: 972; Referees: Covalciuc, Covalciuc (MDA)
6 December 2021; 18:00	2× (yellow card) 1× (suspension)	Report	3× (yellow card) 5× (suspension)	Palau d'Esports de Granollers, Granollers; Attendance: 972; Referees: Covalciuc, Covalciuc (MDA)

6 December 2021; 20:30	Denmark	35–23	South Korea	Palau d'Esports de Granollers, Granollers; Attendance: 1,502; Referees: Gasmi, Gasmi (FRA)
6 December 2021; 20:30	Iversen 6	(19–14)	Ryu 9	Palau d'Esports de Granollers, Granollers; Attendance: 1,502; Referees: Gasmi, Gasmi (FRA)
6 December 2021; 20:30	2× (suspension)	Report	2× (suspension)	Palau d'Esports de Granollers, Granollers; Attendance: 1,502; Referees: Gasmi, Gasmi (FRA)

=== Group G ===
Pos	Team	Pld	W	D	L	GF	GA	GD	Pts	Qualification
1	Brazil	3	3	0	0	92	69	+23	6	Main round
2	Japan	3	2	0	1	93	72	+21	4	Main round
3	Croatia	3	1	0	2	89	74	+15	2	Main round
4	Paraguay	3	0	0	3	52	111	−59	0	Presidents Cup

Source: IHF
Rules for classification: 1) points; 2) head-to-head points; 3) head-to-head goal difference; 4) head-to-head number of goals scored; 5) goal difference.

2 December 2021; 18:00	Croatia	25–30	Brazil	Pabellón Ciutat de Castelló, Castelló; Attendance: 700; Referees: El-Saied, El-Saied (EGY)
2 December 2021; 18:00	Blažević 7	(12–18)	De Paula 7	Pabellón Ciutat de Castelló, Castelló; Attendance: 700; Referees: El-Saied, El-Saied (EGY)
2 December 2021; 18:00	1× (yellow card) 3× (suspension)	Report	1× (yellow card) 3× (suspension)	Pabellón Ciutat de Castelló, Castelló; Attendance: 700; Referees: El-Saied, El-Saied (EGY)

2 December 2021; 20:30	Japan	40–17	Paraguay	Pabellón Ciutat de Castelló, Castelló; Attendance: 400; Referees: Konjičanin, Konjičanin (BIH)
2 December 2021; 20:30	Aizawa, Yoshidome 6	(19–10)	Fiore, Fernández 4	Pabellón Ciutat de Castelló, Castelló; Attendance: 400; Referees: Konjičanin, Konjičanin (BIH)
2 December 2021; 20:30	6× (suspension)	Report	2× (suspension)	Pabellón Ciutat de Castelló, Castelló; Attendance: 400; Referees: Konjičanin, Konjičanin (BIH)

4 December 2021; 18:00	Paraguay	16–38	Croatia	Pabellón Ciutat de Castelló, Castelló; Attendance: 550; Referees: Erdoğan, Özdeniz (TUR)
4 December 2021; 18:00	Acuña 5	(5–15)	Blažević, Turk 6	Pabellón Ciutat de Castelló, Castelló; Attendance: 550; Referees: Erdoğan, Özdeniz (TUR)
4 December 2021; 18:00	8× (suspension)	Report	1× (yellow card) 5× (suspension)	Pabellón Ciutat de Castelló, Castelló; Attendance: 550; Referees: Erdoğan, Özdeniz (TUR)

4 December 2021; 20:30	Japan	25–29	Brazil	Pabellón Ciutat de Castelló, Castelló; Attendance: 890; Referees: Christiansen, Hansen (DEN)
4 December 2021; 20:30	three players 4	(15–12)	Cardoso 7	Pabellón Ciutat de Castelló, Castelló; Attendance: 890; Referees: Christiansen, Hansen (DEN)
4 December 2021; 20:30	5× (suspension)	Report	1× (yellow card) 2× (suspension)	Pabellón Ciutat de Castelló, Castelló; Attendance: 890; Referees: Christiansen, Hansen (DEN)

6 December 2021; 18:00	Brazil	33–19	Paraguay	Pabellón Ciutat de Castelló, Castelló; Attendance: 850; Referees: Koo, Lee (KOR)
6 December 2021; 18:00	Quintino 6	(20–7)	Fernández, Mendoza 3	Pabellón Ciutat de Castelló, Castelló; Attendance: 850; Referees: Koo, Lee (KOR)
6 December 2021; 18:00	1× (yellow card) 4× (suspension)	Report	1× (suspension)	Pabellón Ciutat de Castelló, Castelló; Attendance: 850; Referees: Koo, Lee (KOR)

6 December 2021; 20:30	Croatia	26–28	Japan	Pabellón Ciutat de Castelló, Castelló; Attendance: 1,100; Referees: Alpaidze, Berezkina (RUS)
6 December 2021; 20:30	Kalaus 6	(14–14)	Nakayama 9	Pabellón Ciutat de Castelló, Castelló; Attendance: 1,100; Referees: Alpaidze, Berezkina (RUS)
6 December 2021; 20:30	1× (yellow card) 4× (suspension)	Report	7× (suspension)	Pabellón Ciutat de Castelló, Castelló; Attendance: 1,100; Referees: Alpaidze, Berezkina (RUS)

=== Group H ===
Pos	Team	Pld	W	D	L	GF	GA	GD	Pts	Qualification
1	Spain (H)	3	3	0	0	93	50	+43	6	Main round
2	Argentina	3	2	0	1	80	82	−2	4	Main round
3	Austria	3	1	0	2	86	89	−3	2	Main round
4	China	3	0	0	3	69	107	−38	0	Presidents Cup

Source: IHF
Rules for classification: 1) points; 2) head-to-head points; 3) head-to-head goal difference; 4) head-to-head number of goals scored; 5) goal difference.
(H) Hosts

1 December 2021; 20:30	Spain	29–13	Argentina	Palacio de los Deportes de Torrevieja, Torrevieja; Attendance: 2,080; Referees: Alpaidze, Berezkina (RUS)
1 December 2021; 20:30	Cabral, Campos 5	(11–10)	Karsten, Urban 3	Palacio de los Deportes de Torrevieja, Torrevieja; Attendance: 2,080; Referees: Alpaidze, Berezkina (RUS)
1 December 2021; 20:30	2× (yellow card) 4× (suspension)	Report	5× (suspension)	Palacio de los Deportes de Torrevieja, Torrevieja; Attendance: 2,080; Referees: Alpaidze, Berezkina (RUS)

2 December 2021; 18:00	Austria	38–27	China	Palacio de los Deportes de Torrevieja, Torrevieja; Attendance: 250; Referees: Mitrović, Vešović (MNE)
2 December 2021; 18:00	Pandza 9	(22–13)	Zhang 8	Palacio de los Deportes de Torrevieja, Torrevieja; Attendance: 250; Referees: Mitrović, Vešović (MNE)
2 December 2021; 18:00	4× (suspension)	Report	2× (yellow card) 9× (suspension)	Palacio de los Deportes de Torrevieja, Torrevieja; Attendance: 250; Referees: Mitrović, Vešović (MNE)

4 December 2021; 18:00	Austria	29–31	Argentina	Palacio de los Deportes de Torrevieja, Torrevieja; Attendance: 1,622; Referees: Krichen, Makhlouf (TUN)
4 December 2021; 18:00	Pandza 10	(14–18)	Karsten 11	Palacio de los Deportes de Torrevieja, Torrevieja; Attendance: 1,622; Referees: Krichen, Makhlouf (TUN)
4 December 2021; 18:00	2× (yellow card) 8× (suspension) 1× (red card)	Report	4× (suspension)	Palacio de los Deportes de Torrevieja, Torrevieja; Attendance: 1,622; Referees: Krichen, Makhlouf (TUN)

4 December 2021; 20:30	China	18–33	Spain	Palacio de los Deportes de Torrevieja, Torrevieja; Attendance: 2,619; Referees: Covalciuc, Covalciuc (MDA)
4 December 2021; 20:30	Wang S. 3	(7–16)	Cabral 5	Palacio de los Deportes de Torrevieja, Torrevieja; Attendance: 2,619; Referees: Covalciuc, Covalciuc (MDA)
4 December 2021; 20:30	1× (yellow card) 5× (suspension) 1× (red card)	Report	1× (yellow card) 2× (suspension)	Palacio de los Deportes de Torrevieja, Torrevieja; Attendance: 2,619; Referees: Covalciuc, Covalciuc (MDA)

6 December 2021; 18:00	Argentina	36–24	China	Palacio de los Deportes de Torrevieja, Torrevieja; Attendance: 1,326; Referees: El-Saied, El-Saied (EGY)
6 December 2021; 18:00	Karsten 8	(17–9)	Jin 8	Palacio de los Deportes de Torrevieja, Torrevieja; Attendance: 1,326; Referees: El-Saied, El-Saied (EGY)
6 December 2021; 18:00		Report	6× (suspension)	Palacio de los Deportes de Torrevieja, Torrevieja; Attendance: 1,326; Referees: El-Saied, El-Saied (EGY)

6 December 2021; 20:30	Spain	31–19	Austria	Palacio de los Deportes de Torrevieja, Torrevieja; Attendance: 3,000; Referees: Sekulić, Jovandić (SRB)
6 December 2021; 20:30	Martín 9	(14–6)	Kovács 8	Palacio de los Deportes de Torrevieja, Torrevieja; Attendance: 3,000; Referees: Sekulić, Jovandić (SRB)
6 December 2021; 20:30	2× (yellow card) 2× (suspension)	Report	3× (suspension)	Palacio de los Deportes de Torrevieja, Torrevieja; Attendance: 3,000; Referees: Sekulić, Jovandić (SRB)

== Presidents Cup ==
=== Group I ===
Pos	Team	Pld	W	D	L	GF	GA	GD	Pts	Qualification
1	Angola	3	3	0	0	128	43	+85	6	25th place game
2	Cameroon	3	2	0	1	98	75	+23	4	27th place game
3	Uzbekistan	3	1	0	2	71	126	−55	2	29th place game
4	Iran	3	0	0	3	57	110	−53	0	31st place game

Source: IHF
Rules for classification: 1) points; 2) head-to-head points; 3) head-to-head goal difference; 4) head-to-head number of goals scored; 5) goal difference.

9 December 2021; 15:00	Angola	35–24	Cameroon	Poliesportiu Pla de L'Arc, Llíria; Attendance: 220; Referees: Lovin, Stancu (ROU)
9 December 2021; 15:00	Kassoma 6	(16–14)	Ekoh 7	Poliesportiu Pla de L'Arc, Llíria; Attendance: 220; Referees: Lovin, Stancu (ROU)
9 December 2021; 15:00	2× (yellow card) 6× (suspension) 1× (red card)	Report	1× (yellow card) 2× (suspension)	Poliesportiu Pla de L'Arc, Llíria; Attendance: 220; Referees: Lovin, Stancu (ROU)

9 December 2021; 17:30	Iran	32–37	Uzbekistan	Poliesportiu Pla de L'Arc, Llíria; Attendance: 415; Referees: El-Saied, El-Saied (EGY)
9 December 2021; 17:30	Ghasemi 9	(18–20)	Khudoykulova 11	Poliesportiu Pla de L'Arc, Llíria; Attendance: 415; Referees: El-Saied, El-Saied (EGY)
9 December 2021; 17:30	1× (yellow card) 3× (suspension)	Report	1× (yellow card) 3× (suspension)	Poliesportiu Pla de L'Arc, Llíria; Attendance: 415; Referees: El-Saied, El-Saied (EGY)

11 December 2021; 15:00	Angola	41–8	Iran	Poliesportiu Pla de L'Arc, Llíria; Attendance: 285; Referees: Stancu, Lovin (ROU)
11 December 2021; 15:00	Kassoma 8	(24–4)	Kianiara 4	Poliesportiu Pla de L'Arc, Llíria; Attendance: 285; Referees: Stancu, Lovin (ROU)
11 December 2021; 15:00	2× (yellow card) 3× (suspension)	Report	1× (suspension)	Poliesportiu Pla de L'Arc, Llíria; Attendance: 285; Referees: Stancu, Lovin (ROU)

11 December 2021; 17:30	Cameroon	42–23	Uzbekistan	Poliesportiu Pla de L'Arc, Llíria; Attendance: 400; Referees: Sá, Sá (POR)
11 December 2021; 17:30	Ateba 14	(19–6)	Bahromova 6	Poliesportiu Pla de L'Arc, Llíria; Attendance: 400; Referees: Sá, Sá (POR)
11 December 2021; 17:30	1× (suspension) 1× (red card)	Report	3× (suspension)	Poliesportiu Pla de L'Arc, Llíria; Attendance: 400; Referees: Sá, Sá (POR)

13 December 2021; 15:00	Uzbekistan	11–52	Angola	Poliesportiu Pla de L'Arc, Llíria; Attendance: 50; Referees: Sá, Sá (POR)
13 December 2021; 15:00	Mirzaeva 3	(5–30)	Kassoma 8	Poliesportiu Pla de L'Arc, Llíria; Attendance: 50; Referees: Sá, Sá (POR)
13 December 2021; 15:00	1× (suspension)	Report	1× (yellow card) 2× (suspension)	Poliesportiu Pla de L'Arc, Llíria; Attendance: 50; Referees: Sá, Sá (POR)

13 December 2021; 17:30	Cameroon	32–17	Iran	Poliesportiu Pla de L'Arc, Llíria; Attendance: 120; Referees: Erdoğan, Özdeniz (TUR)
13 December 2021; 17:30	Ebanga 7	(14–9)	Kianiara 5	Poliesportiu Pla de L'Arc, Llíria; Attendance: 120; Referees: Erdoğan, Özdeniz (TUR)
13 December 2021; 17:30	1× (suspension)	Report	1× (yellow card)	Poliesportiu Pla de L'Arc, Llíria; Attendance: 120; Referees: Erdoğan, Özdeniz (TUR)

=== Group II ===
Pos	Team	Pld	W	D	L	GF	GA	GD	Pts	Qualification
1	Slovakia	3	3	0	0	74	54	+20	6	25th place game
2	Tunisia	3	2	0	1	72	59	+13	4	27th place game
3	Paraguay	3	1	0	2	85	92	−7	2	29th place game
4	China (Note: China withdrew after their first game due to a positive COVID-19 test by a player.)	3	0	0	3	24	50	−26	0	31st place game

Source: IHF
Rules for classification: 1) points; 2) head-to-head points; 3) head-to-head goal difference; 4) head-to-head number of goals scored; 5) goal difference.
Notes:

8 December 2021; 15:00	Slovakia	31–27	Tunisia	Poliesportiu Pla de L'Arc, Llíria; Attendance: 320; Referees: Erdoğan, Özdeniz (TUR)
8 December 2021; 15:00	Bíziková 9	(17–14)	Rezgui 6	Poliesportiu Pla de L'Arc, Llíria; Attendance: 320; Referees: Erdoğan, Özdeniz (TUR)
8 December 2021; 15:00	3× (yellow card) 3× (suspension)	Report	2× (yellow card) 2× (suspension)	Poliesportiu Pla de L'Arc, Llíria; Attendance: 320; Referees: Erdoğan, Özdeniz (TUR)

8 December 2021; 17:30	Paraguay	30–24	China	Poliesportiu Pla de L'Arc, Llíria; Attendance: 966; Referees: Sá, Sá (POR)
8 December 2021; 17:30	Mendoza 6	(12–12)	Jin 9	Poliesportiu Pla de L'Arc, Llíria; Attendance: 966; Referees: Sá, Sá (POR)
8 December 2021; 17:30	1× (yellow card) 3× (suspension)	Report	1× (yellow card) 7× (suspension)	Poliesportiu Pla de L'Arc, Llíria; Attendance: 966; Referees: Sá, Sá (POR)

10 December 2021; 15:00	Slovakia	33–27	Paraguay	Poliesportiu Pla de L'Arc, Llíria; Attendance: 120; Referees: El-Saied, El-Saied (EGY)
10 December 2021; 15:00	Lancz 9	(16–15)	Acuña, Fiore 8	Poliesportiu Pla de L'Arc, Llíria; Attendance: 120; Referees: El-Saied, El-Saied (EGY)
10 December 2021; 15:00	3× (yellow card) 2× (suspension)	Report	1× (yellow card) 4× (suspension)	Poliesportiu Pla de L'Arc, Llíria; Attendance: 120; Referees: El-Saied, El-Saied (EGY)

10 December 2021	Tunisia	10–0 (Note: The match could not be played after China withdrew and was forfeited.)	China

12 December 2021	China	0–10	Slovakia

12 December 2021; 17:30	Tunisia	35–28	Paraguay	Poliesportiu Pla de L'Arc, Llíria; Attendance: 823; Referees: Lovin, Stancu (ROU)
12 December 2021; 17:30	Hachana 8	(17–11)	Fernández 8	Poliesportiu Pla de L'Arc, Llíria; Attendance: 823; Referees: Lovin, Stancu (ROU)
12 December 2021; 17:30	4× (suspension)	Report	1× (yellow card) 3× (suspension)	Poliesportiu Pla de L'Arc, Llíria; Attendance: 823; Referees: Lovin, Stancu (ROU)

=== 31st place game ===
15 December 2021	Iran	10–0	China

=== 29th place game ===
15 December 2021; 12:30	Uzbekistan	33–39	Paraguay	Poliesportiu Pla de L'Arc, Llíria; Attendance: 450; Referees: El-Saied, El-Saied (EGY)
15 December 2021; 12:30	Abdumannonova 11	(19–19)	Fiore 10	Poliesportiu Pla de L'Arc, Llíria; Attendance: 450; Referees: El-Saied, El-Saied (EGY)
15 December 2021; 12:30	2× (suspension)	Report	2× (suspension)	Poliesportiu Pla de L'Arc, Llíria; Attendance: 450; Referees: El-Saied, El-Saied (EGY)

=== 27th place game ===
15 December 2021; 15:00	Cameroon	29–35	Tunisia	Poliesportiu Pla de L'Arc, Llíria; Attendance: 500; Referees: Erdoğan, Özdeniz (TUR)
15 December 2021; 15:00	Essam, Ebanga 9	(15–20)	Hachana 10	Poliesportiu Pla de L'Arc, Llíria; Attendance: 500; Referees: Erdoğan, Özdeniz (TUR)
15 December 2021; 15:00	2× (suspension) 1× (red card)	Report	2× (yellow card) 3× (suspension)	Poliesportiu Pla de L'Arc, Llíria; Attendance: 500; Referees: Erdoğan, Özdeniz (TUR)

=== 25th place game ===
15 December 2021; 17:30	Angola	23–21	Slovakia	Poliesportiu Pla de L'Arc, Llíria; Attendance: 340; Referees: Koo, Lee (KOR)
15 December 2021; 17:30	Guialo, Kassoma 6	(11–9)	Bíziková 7	Poliesportiu Pla de L'Arc, Llíria; Attendance: 340; Referees: Koo, Lee (KOR)
15 December 2021; 17:30	1× (yellow card) 5× (suspension)	Report	4× (suspension)	Poliesportiu Pla de L'Arc, Llíria; Attendance: 340; Referees: Koo, Lee (KOR)

== Main round ==
All points obtained in the preliminary round against teams that advanced as well, were carried over.

=== Group I ===
Pos	Team	Pld	W	D	L	GF	GA	GD	Pts	Qualification
1	France	5	5	0	0	134	100	+34	10	Quarterfinals
2	Russian Handball Federation	5	3	1	1	143	129	+14	7	Quarterfinals
3	Serbia	5	3	0	2	124	125	−1	6	
4	Poland	5	2	0	3	120	131	−11	4	
5	Slovenia	5	1	1	3	123	131	−8	3	
6	Montenegro	5	0	0	5	115	143	−28	0	

Source: IHF
Rules for classification: 1) points; 2) head-to-head points; 3) head-to-head goal difference; 4) head-to-head number of goals scored; 5) goal difference.

9 December 2021; 15:30	Russian Handball Federation	26–26	Slovenia	Palau d'Esports de Granollers, Granollers; Attendance: 385; Referees: García, Paolantoni (ARG)
9 December 2021; 15:30	Ilyina 7	(14–15)	Stanko 7	Palau d'Esports de Granollers, Granollers; Attendance: 385; Referees: García, Paolantoni (ARG)
9 December 2021; 15:30	2× (suspension)	Report	1× (yellow card) 6× (suspension)	Palau d'Esports de Granollers, Granollers; Attendance: 385; Referees: García, Paolantoni (ARG)

9 December 2021; 18:00	Montenegro	25–27	Serbia	Palau d'Esports de Granollers, Granollers; Attendance: 810; Referees: Álvarez, Bustamante (ESP)
9 December 2021; 18:00	Radičević 8	(18–14)	Radojević 8	Palau d'Esports de Granollers, Granollers; Attendance: 810; Referees: Álvarez, Bustamante (ESP)
9 December 2021; 18:00	6× (suspension)	Report	1× (yellow card) 1× (suspension) 1× (red card)	Palau d'Esports de Granollers, Granollers; Attendance: 810; Referees: Álvarez, Bustamante (ESP)

9 December 2021; 20:30	France	26–16	Poland	Palau d'Esports de Granollers, Granollers; Attendance: 884; Referees: Lončar, Lončar (CRO)
9 December 2021; 20:30	Foppa 5	(14–9)	three players 3	Palau d'Esports de Granollers, Granollers; Attendance: 884; Referees: Lončar, Lončar (CRO)
9 December 2021; 20:30	1× (yellow card) 1× (suspension)	Report	4× (suspension)	Palau d'Esports de Granollers, Granollers; Attendance: 884; Referees: Lončar, Lončar (CRO)

11 December 2021; 15:30	Montenegro	25–31	Russian Handball Federation	Palau d'Esports de Granollers, Granollers; Attendance: 843; Referees: Erdoğan, Özdeniz (TUR)
11 December 2021; 15:30	Brnović, Radičević 7	(10–18)	Fomina, Skorobogatchenko 6	Palau d'Esports de Granollers, Granollers; Attendance: 843; Referees: Erdoğan, Özdeniz (TUR)
11 December 2021; 15:30	2× (yellow card) 5× (suspension)	Report	2× (yellow card) 5× (suspension)	Palau d'Esports de Granollers, Granollers; Attendance: 843; Referees: Erdoğan, Özdeniz (TUR)

11 December 2021; 18:00	Serbia	19–22	France	Palau d'Esports de Granollers, Granollers; Attendance: 975; Referees: Álvarez, Bustamante (ESP)
11 December 2021; 18:00	Radojević 5	(12–9)	Zaadi 6	Palau d'Esports de Granollers, Granollers; Attendance: 975; Referees: Álvarez, Bustamante (ESP)
11 December 2021; 18:00	2× (yellow card) 2× (suspension)	Report	1× (yellow card) 5× (suspension)	Palau d'Esports de Granollers, Granollers; Attendance: 975; Referees: Álvarez, Bustamante (ESP)

11 December 2021; 20:30	Slovenia	26–27	Poland	Palau d'Esports de Granollers, Granollers; Attendance: 902; Referees: Covalciuc, Covalciuc (MDA)
11 December 2021; 20:30	Gros 8	(13–12)	Nocuń 6	Palau d'Esports de Granollers, Granollers; Attendance: 902; Referees: Covalciuc, Covalciuc (MDA)
11 December 2021; 20:30	4× (suspension)	Report	1× (yellow card) 1× (suspension)	Palau d'Esports de Granollers, Granollers; Attendance: 902; Referees: Covalciuc, Covalciuc (MDA)

13 December 2021; 15:30	Poland	33–28	Montenegro	Palau d'Esports de Granollers, Granollers; Attendance: 320; Referees: Paolantoni, García (ARG)
13 December 2021; 15:30	Rosiak 7	(16–9)	Brnović 6	Palau d'Esports de Granollers, Granollers; Attendance: 320; Referees: Paolantoni, García (ARG)
13 December 2021; 15:30	1× (yellow card) 3× (suspension)	Report	2× (yellow card) 2× (suspension)	Palau d'Esports de Granollers, Granollers; Attendance: 320; Referees: Paolantoni, García (ARG)

13 December 2021; 18:00	Serbia	31–25	Slovenia	Palau d'Esports de Granollers, Granollers; Attendance: 1,180; Referees: Merz, Kuttler (GER)
13 December 2021; 18:00	Stoiljković 7	(19–14)	Varagić 5	Palau d'Esports de Granollers, Granollers; Attendance: 1,180; Referees: Merz, Kuttler (GER)
13 December 2021; 18:00	2× (yellow card) 3× (suspension)	Report	5× (suspension)	Palau d'Esports de Granollers, Granollers; Attendance: 1,180; Referees: Merz, Kuttler (GER)

13 December 2021; 20:30	Russian Handball Federation	28–33	France	Palau d'Esports de Granollers, Granollers; Attendance: 2,620; Referees: Álvarez, Bustamante (ESP)
13 December 2021; 20:30	Managarova 5	(12–17)	Foppa, Pineau 5	Palau d'Esports de Granollers, Granollers; Attendance: 2,620; Referees: Álvarez, Bustamante (ESP)
13 December 2021; 20:30	2× (suspension)	Report	1× (yellow card) 3× (suspension)	Palau d'Esports de Granollers, Granollers; Attendance: 2,620; Referees: Álvarez, Bustamante (ESP)

=== Group II ===
Pos	Team	Pld	W	D	L	GF	GA	GD	Pts	Qualification
1	Norway	5	4	1	0	189	111	+78	9	Quarterfinals
2	Sweden	5	3	2	0	198	121	+77	8	Quarterfinals
3	Netherlands	5	3	1	1	212	128	+84	7	
4	Romania	5	2	0	3	163	135	+28	4	
5	Puerto Rico	5	1	0	4	82	216	−134	2	
6	Kazakhstan	5	0	0	5	97	230	−133	0	

Source: IHF
Rules for classification: 1) points; 2) head-to-head points; 3) head-to-head goal difference; 4) head-to-head number of goals scored; 5) goal difference.

9 December 2021; 15:30	Netherlands	31–30	Romania	Pabellón Ciutat de Castelló, Castelló; Attendance: 450; Referees: Alpaidze, Berezkina (RUS)
9 December 2021; 15:30	Van Wetering 6	(17–14)	Laslo, Pintea 6	Pabellón Ciutat de Castelló, Castelló; Attendance: 450; Referees: Alpaidze, Berezkina (RUS)
9 December 2021; 15:30	2× (suspension)	Report	1× (yellow card) 3× (suspension)	Pabellón Ciutat de Castelló, Castelló; Attendance: 450; Referees: Alpaidze, Berezkina (RUS)

9 December 2021; 18:00	Norway	43–7	Puerto Rico	Pabellón Ciutat de Castelló, Castelló; Attendance: 350; Referees: Erdoğan, Özdeniz (TUR)
9 December 2021; 18:00	Solberg-Isaksen 10	(21–3)	three players 2	Pabellón Ciutat de Castelló, Castelló; Attendance: 350; Referees: Erdoğan, Özdeniz (TUR)
9 December 2021; 18:00	1× (yellow card)	Report	1× (yellow card)	Pabellón Ciutat de Castelló, Castelló; Attendance: 350; Referees: Erdoğan, Özdeniz (TUR)

9 December 2021; 20:30	Kazakhstan	20–55	Sweden	Pabellón Ciutat de Castelló, Castelló; Attendance: 290; Referees: Koo, Lee (KOR)
9 December 2021; 20:30	Alexandrova 7	(10–21)	Hagman 19	Pabellón Ciutat de Castelló, Castelló; Attendance: 290; Referees: Koo, Lee (KOR)
9 December 2021; 20:30	2× (suspension)	Report	1× (yellow card) 1× (suspension)	Pabellón Ciutat de Castelló, Castelló; Attendance: 290; Referees: Koo, Lee (KOR)

11 December 2021; 15:30	Romania	43–20	Puerto Rico	Pabellón Ciutat de Castelló, Castelló; Attendance: 650; Referees: Mitrović, Vešović (MNE)
11 December 2021; 15:30	Dindiligan 7	(20–9)	Ceballos, Fuentes 4	Pabellón Ciutat de Castelló, Castelló; Attendance: 650; Referees: Mitrović, Vešović (MNE)
11 December 2021; 15:30	2× (yellow card) 2× (suspension)	Report	3× (suspension)	Pabellón Ciutat de Castelló, Castelló; Attendance: 650; Referees: Mitrović, Vešović (MNE)

11 December 2021; 18:00	Kazakhstan	15–61	Netherlands	Pabellón Ciutat de Castelló, Castelló; Attendance: 950; Referees: Koo, Lee (KOR)
11 December 2021; 18:00	Alexandrova 5	(9–27)	Van Wetering 18	Pabellón Ciutat de Castelló, Castelló; Attendance: 950; Referees: Koo, Lee (KOR)
11 December 2021; 18:00	3× (suspension) 1× (red card)	Report	1× (yellow card)	Pabellón Ciutat de Castelló, Castelló; Attendance: 950; Referees: Koo, Lee (KOR)

11 December 2021; 20:30	Sweden	30–30	Norway	Pabellón Ciutat de Castelló, Castelló; Attendance: 2,100; Referees: Kuttler, Merz (GER)
11 December 2021; 20:30	Hagman 9	(12–14)	Kristiansen 7	Pabellón Ciutat de Castelló, Castelló; Attendance: 2,100; Referees: Kuttler, Merz (GER)
11 December 2021; 20:30	1× (yellow card) 4× (suspension)	Report	2× (yellow card) 2× (suspension)	Pabellón Ciutat de Castelló, Castelló; Attendance: 2,100; Referees: Kuttler, Merz (GER)

13 December 2021; 15:30	Puerto Rico	30–27	Kazakhstan	Pabellón Ciutat de Castelló, Castelló; Attendance: 250; Referees: Koo, Lee (KOR)
13 December 2021; 15:30	Ceballos 13	(13–11)	Alexandrova 8	Pabellón Ciutat de Castelló, Castelló; Attendance: 250; Referees: Koo, Lee (KOR)
13 December 2021; 15:30	3× (suspension)	Report	3× (suspension)	Pabellón Ciutat de Castelló, Castelló; Attendance: 250; Referees: Koo, Lee (KOR)

13 December 2021; 18:00	Sweden	34–30	Romania	Pabellón Ciutat de Castelló, Castelló; Attendance: 1,600; Referees: Mitrović, Vešović (MNE)
13 December 2021; 18:00	Blohm 7	(19–14)	Laslo 7	Pabellón Ciutat de Castelló, Castelló; Attendance: 1,600; Referees: Mitrović, Vešović (MNE)
13 December 2021; 18:00	2× (yellow card) 1× (suspension)	Report	2× (yellow card) 4× (suspension)	Pabellón Ciutat de Castelló, Castelló; Attendance: 1,600; Referees: Mitrović, Vešović (MNE)

13 December 2021; 20:30	Netherlands	34–37	Norway	Pabellón Ciutat de Castelló, Castelló; Attendance: 2,500; Referees: Konjičanin, Konjičanin (BIH)
13 December 2021; 20:30	Housheer 9	(17–17)	Reistad 9	Pabellón Ciutat de Castelló, Castelló; Attendance: 2,500; Referees: Konjičanin, Konjičanin (BIH)
13 December 2021; 20:30	4× (suspension)	Report	3× (yellow card) 2× (suspension)	Pabellón Ciutat de Castelló, Castelló; Attendance: 2,500; Referees: Konjičanin, Konjičanin (BIH)

=== Group III ===
Pos	Team	Pld	W	D	L	GF	GA	GD	Pts	Qualification
1	Denmark	5	5	0	0	159	90	+69	10	Quarterfinals
2	Germany	5	4	0	1	138	123	+15	8	Quarterfinals
3	Hungary	5	3	0	2	140	134	+6	6	
4	South Korea	5	2	0	3	148	156	−8	4	
5	Czech Republic	5	1	0	4	114	145	−31	2	
6	Congo	5	0	0	5	102	153	−51	0	

Source: IHF
Rules for classification: 1) points; 2) head-to-head points; 3) head-to-head goal difference; 4) head-to-head number of goals scored; 5) goal difference.

8 December 2021; 15:30	Czech Republic	26–32	South Korea	Palau d'Esports de Granollers, Granollers; Attendance: 542; Referees: Covalciuc, Covalciuc (MDA)
8 December 2021; 15:30	Cholevová 6	(13–20)	Kim J. 8	Palau d'Esports de Granollers, Granollers; Attendance: 542; Referees: Covalciuc, Covalciuc (MDA)
8 December 2021; 15:30	2× (yellow card)	Report	1× (yellow card) 2× (suspension)	Palau d'Esports de Granollers, Granollers; Attendance: 542; Referees: Covalciuc, Covalciuc (MDA)

8 December 2021; 18:00	Germany	29–18	Congo	Palau d'Esports de Granollers, Granollers; Attendance: 1,558; Referees: Belkhiri, Hamidi (ALG)
8 December 2021; 18:00	Stockschläder 6	(15–7)	Diagouraga 7	Palau d'Esports de Granollers, Granollers; Attendance: 1,558; Referees: Belkhiri, Hamidi (ALG)
8 December 2021; 18:00	1× (yellow card) 5× (suspension)	Report	1× (yellow card) 3× (suspension)	Palau d'Esports de Granollers, Granollers; Attendance: 1,558; Referees: Belkhiri, Hamidi (ALG)

8 December 2021; 20:30	Denmark	30–19	Hungary	Palau d'Esports de Granollers, Granollers; Attendance: 1,921; Referees: Lončar, Lončar (CRO)
8 December 2021; 20:30	Jørgensen 6	(15–11)	Kácsor 4	Palau d'Esports de Granollers, Granollers; Attendance: 1,921; Referees: Lončar, Lončar (CRO)
8 December 2021; 20:30	1× (yellow card) 3× (suspension)	Report	2× (yellow card) 3× (suspension)	Palau d'Esports de Granollers, Granollers; Attendance: 1,921; Referees: Lončar, Lončar (CRO)

10 December 2021; 15:30	South Korea	28–37	Germany	Palau d'Esports de Granollers, Granollers; Attendance: 438; Referees: Paolantoni, García (ARG)
10 December 2021; 15:30	Lee 6	(16–19)	Bölk, Grijseels 8	Palau d'Esports de Granollers, Granollers; Attendance: 438; Referees: Paolantoni, García (ARG)
10 December 2021; 15:30	4× (suspension)	Report	1× (yellow card) 6× (suspension)	Palau d'Esports de Granollers, Granollers; Attendance: 438; Referees: Paolantoni, García (ARG)

10 December 2021; 18:00	Hungary	30–22	Congo	Palau d'Esports de Granollers, Granollers; Attendance: 583; Referees: Covalciuc, Covalciuc (MDA)
10 December 2021; 18:00	Planéta 8	(16–8)	Ngombele 7	Palau d'Esports de Granollers, Granollers; Attendance: 583; Referees: Covalciuc, Covalciuc (MDA)
10 December 2021; 18:00	3× (suspension)	Report	2× (yellow card) 4× (suspension)	Palau d'Esports de Granollers, Granollers; Attendance: 583; Referees: Covalciuc, Covalciuc (MDA)

10 December 2021; 20:30	Czech Republic	14–29	Denmark	Palau d'Esports de Granollers, Granollers; Attendance: 1,019; Referees: Belkhiri, Hamidi (ALG)
10 December 2021; 20:30	Kovářová 4	(9–12)	Friis 4	Palau d'Esports de Granollers, Granollers; Attendance: 1,019; Referees: Belkhiri, Hamidi (ALG)
10 December 2021; 20:30	1× (yellow card) 4× (suspension)	Report	4× (suspension)	Palau d'Esports de Granollers, Granollers; Attendance: 1,019; Referees: Belkhiri, Hamidi (ALG)

12 December 2021; 15:30	Congo	21–24	Czech Republic	Palau d'Esports de Granollers, Granollers; Attendance: 620; Referees: Lončar, Lončar (CRO)
12 December 2021; 15:30	Divoko, Yimga 4	(11–11)	Zachová 6	Palau d'Esports de Granollers, Granollers; Attendance: 620; Referees: Lončar, Lončar (CRO)
12 December 2021; 15:30	1× (yellow card) 2× (suspension)	Report	1× (yellow card) 5× (suspension)	Palau d'Esports de Granollers, Granollers; Attendance: 620; Referees: Lončar, Lončar (CRO)

12 December 2021; 18:00	South Korea	28–35	Hungary	Palau d'Esports de Granollers, Granollers; Attendance: 1,019; Referees: Covalciuc, Covalciuc (MDA)
12 December 2021; 18:00	Lee 6	(13–17)	Háfra 8	Palau d'Esports de Granollers, Granollers; Attendance: 1,019; Referees: Covalciuc, Covalciuc (MDA)
12 December 2021; 18:00	4× (suspension)	Report	3× (suspension)	Palau d'Esports de Granollers, Granollers; Attendance: 1,019; Referees: Covalciuc, Covalciuc (MDA)

12 December 2021; 20:30	Denmark	32–16	Germany	Palau d'Esports de Granollers, Granollers; Attendance: 1,735; Referees: Paolantoni, García (ARG)
12 December 2021; 20:30	three players 5	(13–8)	Grijseels 5	Palau d'Esports de Granollers, Granollers; Attendance: 1,735; Referees: Paolantoni, García (ARG)
12 December 2021; 20:30	1× (yellow card) 2× (suspension)	Report	2× (yellow card) 3× (suspension) 1× (red card)	Palau d'Esports de Granollers, Granollers; Attendance: 1,735; Referees: Paolantoni, García (ARG)

=== Group IV ===
Pos	Team	Pld	W	D	L	GF	GA	GD	Pts	Qualification
1	Spain (H)	5	5	0	0	142	105	+37	10	Quarterfinals
2	Brazil	5	4	0	1	145	127	+18	8	Quarterfinals
3	Japan	5	3	0	2	142	140	+2	6	
4	Austria	5	1	0	4	136	155	−19	2 (Note: First head-to-head goal difference: Austria +2; Croatia +2; Argentina −4, next head-to-head number of goals scored: Austria 56; Croatia 51.)	
5	Croatia	5	1	0	4	125	134	−9	2	
6	Argentina	5	1	0	4	112	141	−29	2	

Source: IHF
Rules for classification: 1) points; 2) head-to-head points; 3) head-to-head goal difference; 4) head-to-head number of goals scored; 5) goal difference.
(H) Hosts
Notes:

8 December 2021; 15:30	Croatia	28–22	Argentina	Palacio de los Deportes de Torrevieja, Torrevieja; Attendance: 390; Referees: Christiansen, Hansen (DEN)
8 December 2021; 15:30	Posavec 8	(12–14)	Cavo, Mendoza 5	Palacio de los Deportes de Torrevieja, Torrevieja; Attendance: 390; Referees: Christiansen, Hansen (DEN)
8 December 2021; 15:30	2× (yellow card) 6× (suspension)	Report	2× (suspension)	Palacio de los Deportes de Torrevieja, Torrevieja; Attendance: 390; Referees: Christiansen, Hansen (DEN)

8 December 2021; 18:00	Brazil	38–31	Austria	Palacio de los Deportes de Torrevieja, Torrevieja; Attendance: 606; Referees: Gasmi, Gasmi (FRA)
8 December 2021; 18:00	Araujo 6	(15–15)	I. Ivančok, Kovács 8	Palacio de los Deportes de Torrevieja, Torrevieja; Attendance: 606; Referees: Gasmi, Gasmi (FRA)
8 December 2021; 18:00	1× (yellow card) 3× (suspension)	Report	2× (yellow card) 5× (suspension)	Palacio de los Deportes de Torrevieja, Torrevieja; Attendance: 606; Referees: Gasmi, Gasmi (FRA)

8 December 2021; 20:30	Spain	28–26	Japan	Palacio de los Deportes de Torrevieja, Torrevieja; Attendance: 2,000; Referees: Krichen, Makhlouf (TUN)
8 December 2021; 20:30	Cabral, Etxeberria 5	(15–15)	Aizawa, Matsumoto 7	Palacio de los Deportes de Torrevieja, Torrevieja; Attendance: 2,000; Referees: Krichen, Makhlouf (TUN)
8 December 2021; 20:30	1× (yellow card) 2× (suspension)	Report	3× (suspension)	Palacio de los Deportes de Torrevieja, Torrevieja; Attendance: 2,000; Referees: Krichen, Makhlouf (TUN)

10 December 2021; 15:30	Argentina	19–24	Brazil	Palacio de los Deportes de Torrevieja, Torrevieja; Attendance: 200; Referees: Konjičanin, Konjičanin (BIH)
10 December 2021; 15:30	Karsten 5	(10–13)	Matieli 9	Palacio de los Deportes de Torrevieja, Torrevieja; Attendance: 200; Referees: Konjičanin, Konjičanin (BIH)
10 December 2021; 15:30	2× (suspension)	Report	1× (yellow card) 3× (suspension) 1× (red card)	Palacio de los Deportes de Torrevieja, Torrevieja; Attendance: 200; Referees: Konjičanin, Konjičanin (BIH)

10 December 2021; 18:00	Japan	32–30	Austria	Palacio de los Deportes de Torrevieja, Torrevieja; Attendance: 450; Referees: Jovandić, Sekulić (SRB)
10 December 2021; 18:00	Kondo 6	(15–19)	I. Ivančok 8	Palacio de los Deportes de Torrevieja, Torrevieja; Attendance: 450; Referees: Jovandić, Sekulić (SRB)
10 December 2021; 18:00	1× (yellow card) 2× (suspension) 1× (red card)	Report	2× (yellow card) 2× (suspension)	Palacio de los Deportes de Torrevieja, Torrevieja; Attendance: 450; Referees: Jovandić, Sekulić (SRB)

10 December 2021; 20:30	Croatia	23–27	Spain	Palacio de los Deportes de Torrevieja, Torrevieja; Attendance: 2,200; Referees: Gasmi, Gasmi (FRA)
10 December 2021; 20:30	Blažević 7	(9–12)	Cabral 6	Palacio de los Deportes de Torrevieja, Torrevieja; Attendance: 2,200; Referees: Gasmi, Gasmi (FRA)
10 December 2021; 20:30	2× (yellow card) 6× (suspension)	Report	3× (suspension)	Palacio de los Deportes de Torrevieja, Torrevieja; Attendance: 2,200; Referees: Gasmi, Gasmi (FRA)

12 December 2021; 15:30	Argentina	27–31	Japan	Palacio de los Deportes de Torrevieja, Torrevieja; Attendance: 500; Referees: Christiansen, Hansen (DEN)
12 December 2021; 15:30	Karsten 13	(14–15)	three players 7	Palacio de los Deportes de Torrevieja, Torrevieja; Attendance: 500; Referees: Christiansen, Hansen (DEN)
12 December 2021; 15:30	1× (yellow card) 3× (suspension)	Report	4× (suspension)	Palacio de los Deportes de Torrevieja, Torrevieja; Attendance: 500; Referees: Christiansen, Hansen (DEN)

12 December 2021; 18:00	Austria	27–23	Croatia	Palacio de los Deportes de Torrevieja, Torrevieja; Attendance: 850; Referees: Krichen, Makhlouf (TUN)
12 December 2021; 18:00	Kovács 7	(12–13)	Kalaus 6	Palacio de los Deportes de Torrevieja, Torrevieja; Attendance: 850; Referees: Krichen, Makhlouf (TUN)
12 December 2021; 18:00	2× (yellow card) 5× (suspension) 1× (red card)	Report	3× (suspension)	Palacio de los Deportes de Torrevieja, Torrevieja; Attendance: 850; Referees: Krichen, Makhlouf (TUN)

12 December 2021; 20:30	Spain	27–24	Brazil	Palacio de los Deportes de Torrevieja, Torrevieja; Attendance: 3,000; Referees: Sekulić, Jovandić (SRB)
12 December 2021; 20:30	Cabral 7	(12–10)	Quintino 6	Palacio de los Deportes de Torrevieja, Torrevieja; Attendance: 3,000; Referees: Sekulić, Jovandić (SRB)
12 December 2021; 20:30	3× (suspension)	Report	3× (suspension)	Palacio de los Deportes de Torrevieja, Torrevieja; Attendance: 3,000; Referees: Sekulić, Jovandić (SRB)

== Final round ==
=== Bracket ===
Quarter-finals
15 December
France	31
Sweden	26
14 December
Denmark	30
Brazil	25
15 December
Norway	34
Russian Handball Federation	28
14 December
Spain	26
Germany	21

Semi-finals
17 December
France	23
Denmark	22
17 December
Norway	27
Spain	21

Final
19 December
France	22
Norway	29
Third place
19 December
Denmark	35
Spain	28

=== Quarterfinals ===
14 December 2021; 17:30	Denmark	30–25	Brazil	Palau d'Esports de Granollers, Granollers; Attendance: 1,220; Referees: Sekulić, Jovandić (SRB)
14 December 2021; 17:30	Nolsøe 6	(14–13)	Cardoso 10	Palau d'Esports de Granollers, Granollers; Attendance: 1,220; Referees: Sekulić, Jovandić (SRB)
14 December 2021; 17:30	5× (suspension) 1× (red card)	Report	1× (yellow card) 4× (suspension)	Palau d'Esports de Granollers, Granollers; Attendance: 1,220; Referees: Sekulić, Jovandić (SRB)

14 December 2021; 20:30	Spain	26–21	Germany	Palau d'Esports de Granollers, Granollers; Attendance: 2,565; Referees: Christiansen, Hansen (DEN)
14 December 2021; 20:30	Campos 7	(14–10)	Maidhof 6	Palau d'Esports de Granollers, Granollers; Attendance: 2,565; Referees: Christiansen, Hansen (DEN)
14 December 2021; 20:30	2× (yellow card) 1× (suspension)	Report	1× (yellow card) 3× (suspension)	Palau d'Esports de Granollers, Granollers; Attendance: 2,565; Referees: Christiansen, Hansen (DEN)

15 December 2021; 17:30	Norway	34–28	Russian Handball Federation	Palau d'Esports de Granollers, Granollers; Attendance: 870; Referees: Merz, Kuttler (GER)
15 December 2021; 17:30	Mørk 9	(19–15)	Markova, Skorobogatchenko 4	Palau d'Esports de Granollers, Granollers; Attendance: 870; Referees: Merz, Kuttler (GER)
15 December 2021; 17:30	1× (yellow card) 2× (suspension)	Report	1× (yellow card) 3× (suspension)	Palau d'Esports de Granollers, Granollers; Attendance: 870; Referees: Merz, Kuttler (GER)

15 December 2021; 20:30	France	31–26	Sweden	Palau d'Esports de Granollers, Granollers; Attendance: 1,226; Referees: Alpaidze, Berezkina (RUS)
15 December 2021; 20:30	three players 4	(15–15)	Hagman 9	Palau d'Esports de Granollers, Granollers; Attendance: 1,226; Referees: Alpaidze, Berezkina (RUS)
15 December 2021; 20:30	3× (suspension)	Report	2× (suspension)	Palau d'Esports de Granollers, Granollers; Attendance: 1,226; Referees: Alpaidze, Berezkina (RUS)

=== Semifinals ===
17 December 2021; 17:30	France	23–22	Denmark	Palau d'Esports de Granollers, Granollers; Attendance: 3,150; Referees: Álvarez, Bustamante (ESP)
17 December 2021; 17:30	Foppa 4	(10–12)	Haugsted 5	Palau d'Esports de Granollers, Granollers; Attendance: 3,150; Referees: Álvarez, Bustamante (ESP)
17 December 2021; 17:30	2× (yellow card) 1× (suspension)	Report	2× (yellow card) 4× (suspension)	Palau d'Esports de Granollers, Granollers; Attendance: 3,150; Referees: Álvarez, Bustamante (ESP)

17 December 2021; 20:30	Norway	27–21	Spain	Palau d'Esports de Granollers, Granollers; Attendance: 3,150; Referees: Merz, Kuttler (GER)
17 December 2021; 20:30	Mørk 8	(11–11)	Cabral 5	Palau d'Esports de Granollers, Granollers; Attendance: 3,150; Referees: Merz, Kuttler (GER)
17 December 2021; 20:30	3× (suspension)	Report	3× (yellow card) 2× (suspension)	Palau d'Esports de Granollers, Granollers; Attendance: 3,150; Referees: Merz, Kuttler (GER)

=== Third place game ===
19 December 2021; 14:30	Denmark	35–28	Spain	Palau d'Esports de Granollers, Granollers; Attendance: 3,969; Referees: Konjičanin, Konjičanin (BIH)
19 December 2021; 14:30	Burgaard 7	(16–13)	Martín 6	Palau d'Esports de Granollers, Granollers; Attendance: 3,969; Referees: Konjičanin, Konjičanin (BIH)
19 December 2021; 14:30	1× (yellow card) 3× (suspension)	Report	1× (yellow card) 4× (suspension)	Palau d'Esports de Granollers, Granollers; Attendance: 3,969; Referees: Konjičanin, Konjičanin (BIH)

=== Final ===
19 December 2021; 17:30	France	22–29	Norway	Palau d'Esports de Granollers, Granollers; Attendance: 4,316; Referees: Alpaidze, Berezkina (RUS)
19 December 2021; 17:30	Pineau 4	(16–12)	Reistad 6	Palau d'Esports de Granollers, Granollers; Attendance: 4,316; Referees: Alpaidze, Berezkina (RUS)
19 December 2021; 17:30	1× (yellow card) 4× (suspension)	Report	2× (yellow card) 3× (suspension)	Palau d'Esports de Granollers, Granollers; Attendance: 4,316; Referees: Alpaidze, Berezkina (RUS)

== Final ranking and awards ==
Places 1 to 4 and 25 to 32 were decided by play-off or knock-out. The losers of the quarter finals were ranked 5th to 8th according to the places in the main round, points gained and goal difference. Teams finishing third in the main round were ranked 9th to 12th, teams finishing fourth in the main round were ranked 13th to 16th, teams finishing fifth in the main round were ranked 17th to 20th and teams ranked sixth were ranked 21st to 24th. In case of a tie in points gained, the goal difference of the main round was taken into account, then number of goals scored. If teams were still equal, number of points gained in the preliminary round were considered followed by the goal difference and then number of goals scored in the preliminary round.

Rank	Team
1st place, gold medalist(s)	Norway
2nd place, silver medalist(s)	France
3rd place, bronze medalist(s)	Denmark
4	Spain
5	Sweden
6	Brazil
7	Germany
8	Russian Handball Federation
9	Netherlands
10	Hungary
11	Japan
12	Serbia
13	Romania
14	South Korea
15	Poland
16	Austria
17	Slovenia
18	Croatia
19	Czech Republic
20	Puerto Rico
21	Argentina
22	Montenegro
23	Congo
24	Kazakhstan
25	Angola
26	Slovakia
27	Tunisia
28	Cameroon
29	Paraguay
30	Uzbekistan
31	Iran
32	China

Qualified for the 2023 World Women's Handball Championship

2021 Women's World Champions

Norway
Fourth title

Team roster: Henny Reistad, Emilie Hegh Arntzen, Veronica Kristiansen, Nora Mørk, Stine Bredal Oftedal, Malin Aune, Silje Solberg, Kari Brattset Dale, Vilde Ingstad, Katrine Lunde, Moa Högdahl, Marit Røsberg Jacobsen, Camilla Herrem, Sanna Solberg-Isaksen, Kristine Breistøl, Emilie Hovden, Rikke Granlund, Maren Nyland Aardahl.
Head coach: Thorir Hergeirsson.

=== All-Star team ===
The all-star team and MVP was announced on 19 December 2021.

Position	Player
Most valuable player	(Norway) Kari Brattset Dale
Goalkeeper	(Denmark) Sandra Toft
Right wing	(Spain) Carmen Martín
Right back	(Norway) Nora Mørk
Centre back	(France) Grâce Zaadi Deuna
Left back	(Norway) Henny Reistad
Left wing	(France) Coralie Lassource
Pivot	(France) Pauletta Foppa

== Statistics ==
=== Top goalscorers ===
Rank	Name	Team	Goals	Shots	%
1	Nathalie Hagman	Sweden	71	91	78
2	Alexandrina Cabral	Spain	44	81	54
3	Irina Alexandrova	Kazakhstan	43	87	49
3	Elke Karsten	Argentina	43	73	59
3	Patrícia Kovács	Austria	43	74	58
3	Nora Mørk	Norway	43	62	69
7	Cyrielle Ebanga	Cameroon	41	79	52
7	Jovanka Radičević	Montenegro	41	56	73
9	Bo van Wetering	Netherlands	40	50	80
10	Kari Brattset Dale	Norway	38	46	83
10	Albertina Kassoma	Angola	38	42	90
10	Henny Reistad	Norway	38	60	63

Source: IHF

=== Top goalkeepers ===
Rank	Name	Team	%	Saves	Shots
1	Althea Reinhardt	Denmark	50	71	141
2	Yara ten Holte	Netherlands	44	24	54
3	Sandra Toft	Denmark	43	80	188
4	Kristina Graovac	Serbia	40	26	65
4	Tess Wester	Netherlands	40	72	181
6	Marta Alberto	Angola	37	43	115
7	Johanna Bundsen	Sweden	36	20	56
7	Mercedes Castellanos	Spain	36	50	137
7	Silvia Navarro	Spain	36	64	179
7	Viktória Oguntoyová	Slovakia	36	38	107
7	Silje Solberg	Norway	36	45	124

Source: IHF

=== Top assists ===
Rank	Name	Team	Assists
1	Patrícia Kovács	Austria	46
2	Larissa Nüsser	Netherlands	45
2	Jamina Roberts	Sweden	45
4	Nora Mørk	Norway	44
5	Natsuki Aizawa	Japan	42
5	Stine Bredal Oftedal	Norway	42
5	Lee Mi-gyeong	South Korea	42
8	Grâce Zaadi Deuna	France	41
9	Itana Grbić	Montenegro	39
10	Marizza Faría	Paraguay	36
10	Kristina Jørgensen	Denmark	36
10	Adjani Ngouoko	Cameroon	36

Source: IHF

=== Top blocks ===
Rank	Name	Team	Total	Average
1	Line Haugsted	Denmark	19	2.1
2	Liliana Venâncio	Angola	15	2.1
3	Kelly Dulfer	Netherlands	12	2.0
4	Tamires de Araújo	Brazil	10	1.4
5	Kari Brattset Dale	Norway	9	1.0
5	Kristine Breistøl	Norway	9	1.0
7	Daniela de Jong	Sweden	8	1.1
7	Albertina Kassoma	Angola	8	1.1
9	Karina dos Santos	Paraguay	7	1.0
9	Béatrice Edwige	France	7	0.8
9	Irene Espínola Perez	Spain	7	0.8
9	Marija Petrović	Serbia	7	1.2
9	Danick Snelder	Netherlands	7	1.2
9	Yvette Yuoh	Cameroon	7	1.0

Source: IHF
