= 2024 IHF Women's Olympic Qualification Tournaments =

Handball tournament

The 2024 IHF Women's Olympic Qualification Tournaments were held from 11 to 14 April 2024. Four teams took part in each tournament, with the two best-ranked teams qualifying for the 2024 Summer Olympics.

Germany, Hungary, Netherlands, Slovenia, Spain and Sweden, all six from Europe, qualified for the Olympics.

== Format ==
There were three qualifying tournaments. Only twelve eligible teams through the five events mentioned above qualified for these tournaments:

- The top six teams from the World championship that did not already qualify through their continental championships were eligible to participate in the tournament.
- The highest-ranked teams of each continent in the World championship represented the continent in order to determine the continental ranking. The first-ranked continent (Europe) received two more places for the tournament. The second (Americas), third (Africa), and fourth (Asia)-ranked continents received one place each. The last place belongs to a team from Oceania, if one was ranked between 8 and 12th at the World Championship. As no team from Oceania met this condition, the second-ranked continent received an extra place instead. The teams that already earned their places through their World championship ranking were not considered for receiving places through the continental criterion. In such cases, the access list was rebalanced accordingly.
- The twelve teams were allocated in three pools of four teams according to the table below. The top two teams from each pool qualified for the 2024 Olympic Games.

2024 Olympic Qualification Tournament #1	2024 Olympic Qualification Tournament #2	2024 Olympic Qualification Tournament #3
4th from World: Sweden; 10th from World: Hungary; ~~2nd from Africa: Cameroon~~; 2nd from Asia: Japan; Wild card: Great Britain	5th from World: Netherlands; 8th from World: Czech Republic; 2nd from Americas: Argentina; 9th from Europe: Spain	6th from World: Germany; 7th from World: Montenegro; 8th from Europe: Slovenia; 3rd from Americas: Paraguay

The host countries were announced on 22 December 2023.

On 9 April 2024, Cameroon withdrew and was replaced by Great Britain.

== Referees ==
The referees were announced on 27 February 2024.

Tournament 1
Argentina	Mariana García; Maria Paolantoni
Germany	Tanja Kuttler; Maike Merz
Switzerland	Arthur Brunner; Morad Salah
Uruguay	Cristian Lemes; Mathías Sosa

Tournament 2
Bosnia and Herzegovina	Amar Konjičanin/ Dino Konjičanin
Egypt	Heidy El-Saied; Yasmina El-Saied
Serbia	Marko Sekulić; Vladimir Jovandić
Sweden	Mirza Kurtagic; Mattias Wetterwik

Tournament 3
France	Karim Gasmi; Raouf Gasmi
Romania	Cristina Lovin; Simona Stancu
South Korea	Koo Bo-nok; Lee Se-ok
Spain	Javier Álvarez; Yon Bustamante

== Tournament 1 ==
Tournament 1
Tournament details
- Host country: Hungary
- Venue(s): 1 (in 1 host city)
- Dates: 11–14 April
- Teams: 4 (from 3 confederations)

Tournament statistics
- Matches played: 6
- Goals scored: 360 (60 per match)
- Attendance: 13,669 (2,278 per match)
- Top scorer(s): (Hungary) Katrin Klujber (23 goals)

The tournament was held in Debrecen, Hungary.

=== Standings ===
Pos	Team	Pld	W	D	L	GF	GA	GD	Pts	Qualification
1	Hungary (H)	3	3	0	0	114	64	+50	6	2024 Summer Olympics
2	Sweden	3	2	0	1	112	64	+48	4	2024 Summer Olympics
3	Japan	3	1	0	2	99	88	+11	2	
4	Great Britain	3	0	0	3	35	144	−109	0	

Source: IHF
Rules for classification: 1) Points; 2) Head-to-head points; 3) Head-to-head goal difference; 4) Head-to-head goals scored; 5) Goal difference; 6) Goals scored; 7) Draw.
(H) Hosts

=== Matches ===
All times are local (UTC+2).

11 April 2024; 15:30	Hungary	49–11	Great Britain	Főnix Aréna, Debrecen; Attendance: 2,189; Referees: Lemes, Sosa (URU)
11 April 2024; 15:30	Faluvégi 7	(24–6)	L. Davies 4	Főnix Aréna, Debrecen; Attendance: 2,189; Referees: Lemes, Sosa (URU)
11 April 2024; 15:30	1× (suspension)	Report	3× (suspension)	Főnix Aréna, Debrecen; Attendance: 2,189; Referees: Lemes, Sosa (URU)

11 April 2024; 18:00	Sweden	35–28	Japan	Főnix Aréna, Debrecen; Attendance: 1,643; Referees: Brunner, Salah (SUI)
11 April 2024; 18:00	Carlson 7	(17–13)	four players 4	Főnix Aréna, Debrecen; Attendance: 1,643; Referees: Brunner, Salah (SUI)
11 April 2024; 18:00	2× (suspension)	Report	2× (suspension)	Főnix Aréna, Debrecen; Attendance: 1,643; Referees: Brunner, Salah (SUI)

12 April 2024; 18:00	Sweden	25–28	Hungary	Főnix Aréna, Debrecen; Attendance: 3,679; Referees: Kuttler, Merz (GER)
12 April 2024; 18:00	Carlson 7	(11–15)	Kuczora 8	Főnix Aréna, Debrecen; Attendance: 3,679; Referees: Kuttler, Merz (GER)
12 April 2024; 18:00	2× (suspension)	Report	2× (yellow card) 4× (suspension)	Főnix Aréna, Debrecen; Attendance: 3,679; Referees: Kuttler, Merz (GER)

12 April 2024; 20:30	Japan	43–16	Great Britain	Főnix Aréna, Debrecen; Attendance: 694; Referees: García, Paolantoni (ARG)
12 April 2024; 20:30	Sahara, Kinjo 7	(25–9)	Gowland 6	Főnix Aréna, Debrecen; Attendance: 694; Referees: García, Paolantoni (ARG)
12 April 2024; 20:30	4× (suspension)	Report	1× (yellow card) 3× (suspension)	Főnix Aréna, Debrecen; Attendance: 694; Referees: García, Paolantoni (ARG)

14 April 2024; 16:45	Great Britain	8–52	Sweden	Főnix Aréna, Debrecen; Attendance: 1,222; Referees: Lemes, Sosa (URU)
14 April 2024; 16:45	Kesselring 4	(6–26)	Hagman 12	Főnix Aréna, Debrecen; Attendance: 1,222; Referees: Lemes, Sosa (URU)
14 April 2024; 16:45	2× (suspension)	Report	1× (yellow card) 3× (suspension)	Főnix Aréna, Debrecen; Attendance: 1,222; Referees: Lemes, Sosa (URU)

14 April 2024; 19:15	Hungary	37–28	Japan	Főnix Aréna, Debrecen; Attendance: 4,242; Referees: García, Paolantoni (ARG)
14 April 2024; 19:15	Klujber 11	(18–11)	Aizawa 7	Főnix Aréna, Debrecen; Attendance: 4,242; Referees: García, Paolantoni (ARG)
14 April 2024; 19:15	1× (yellow card) 3× (suspension)	Report	1× (suspension) 1× (red card)	Főnix Aréna, Debrecen; Attendance: 4,242; Referees: García, Paolantoni (ARG)

== Tournament 2 ==
Tournament 2
Tournament details
- Host country: Spain
- Venue(s): 1 (in 1 host city)
- Dates: 11–14 April
- Teams: 4 (from 2 confederations)

Tournament statistics
- Matches played: 6
- Goals scored: 334 (55.67 per match)
- Attendance: 13,680 (2,280 per match)
- Top scorer(s): (Czech Republic) Markéta Jeřábková (24 goals)

The tournament was held in Torrevieja, Spain.

=== Standings ===
Pos	Team	Pld	W	D	L	GF	GA	GD	Pts	Qualification
1	Netherlands	3	3	0	0	93	66	+27	6	2024 Summer Olympics
2	Spain (H)	3	2	0	1	83	71	+12	4	2024 Summer Olympics
3	Czech Republic	3	1	0	2	80	96	−16	2	
4	Argentina	3	0	0	3	78	101	−23	0	

Source: IHF
Rules for classification: 1) Points; 2) Head-to-head points; 3) Head-to-head goal difference; 4) Head-to-head goals scored; 5) Goal difference; 6) Goals scored; 7) Draw.
(H) Hosts

=== Matches ===
All times are local (UTC+2).

11 April 2024; 18:30	Czech Republic	21–31	Spain	Palacio de los Deportes de Torrevieja, Torrevieja; Attendance: 2,780; Referees: A. Konjičanin, D. Konjičanin (BIH)
11 April 2024; 18:30	Cholevová 7	(10–19)	González 7	Palacio de los Deportes de Torrevieja, Torrevieja; Attendance: 2,780; Referees: A. Konjičanin, D. Konjičanin (BIH)
11 April 2024; 18:30	5× (suspension)	Report	4× (suspension)	Palacio de los Deportes de Torrevieja, Torrevieja; Attendance: 2,780; Referees: A. Konjičanin, D. Konjičanin (BIH)

11 April 2024; 21:00	Netherlands	34–22	Argentina	Palacio de los Deportes de Torrevieja, Torrevieja; Attendance: 530; Referees: Kurtagic, Wetterwik (SWE)
11 April 2024; 21:00	Malestein 6	(19–16)	Karsten 6	Palacio de los Deportes de Torrevieja, Torrevieja; Attendance: 530; Referees: Kurtagic, Wetterwik (SWE)
11 April 2024; 21:00	5× (suspension)	Report	4× (suspension)	Palacio de los Deportes de Torrevieja, Torrevieja; Attendance: 530; Referees: Kurtagic, Wetterwik (SWE)

12 April 2024; 18:30	Netherlands	32–18	Czech Republic	Palacio de los Deportes de Torrevieja, Torrevieja; Attendance: 1,240; Referees: H. El-Saied, Y. El-Saied (EGY)
12 April 2024; 18:30	Malestein, Van Wetering 7	(18–6)	Jeřábková 8	Palacio de los Deportes de Torrevieja, Torrevieja; Attendance: 1,240; Referees: H. El-Saied, Y. El-Saied (EGY)
12 April 2024; 18:30	1× (yellow card) 4× (suspension)	Report	4× (suspension)	Palacio de los Deportes de Torrevieja, Torrevieja; Attendance: 1,240; Referees: H. El-Saied, Y. El-Saied (EGY)

12 April 2024; 21:00	Argentina	23–26	Spain	Palacio de los Deportes de Torrevieja, Torrevieja; Attendance: 3,625; Referees: Sekulić, Jovandić (SRB)
12 April 2024; 21:00	Karsten 8	(14–14)	Arcos, Gutiérrez 7	Palacio de los Deportes de Torrevieja, Torrevieja; Attendance: 3,625; Referees: Sekulić, Jovandić (SRB)
12 April 2024; 21:00	3× (suspension)	Report	4× (suspension)	Palacio de los Deportes de Torrevieja, Torrevieja; Attendance: 3,625; Referees: Sekulić, Jovandić (SRB)

14 April 2024; 15:30	Czech Republic	41–33	Argentina	Palacio de los Deportes de Torrevieja, Torrevieja; Attendance: 1,630; Referees: H. El-Saied, Y. El-Saied (EGY)
14 April 2024; 15:30	Jeřábková 14	(23–16)	Karsten 9	Palacio de los Deportes de Torrevieja, Torrevieja; Attendance: 1,630; Referees: H. El-Saied, Y. El-Saied (EGY)
14 April 2024; 15:30	1× (yellow card) 6× (suspension)	Report	1× (yellow card) 2× (suspension)	Palacio de los Deportes de Torrevieja, Torrevieja; Attendance: 1,630; Referees: H. El-Saied, Y. El-Saied (EGY)

14 April 2024; 18:00	Spain	26–27	Netherlands	Palacio de los Deportes de Torrevieja, Torrevieja; Attendance: 3,875; Referees: Kurtagic, Wetterwik (SWE)
14 April 2024; 18:00	Prieto O'Mullony 9	(15–15)	Malestein 8	Palacio de los Deportes de Torrevieja, Torrevieja; Attendance: 3,875; Referees: Kurtagic, Wetterwik (SWE)
14 April 2024; 18:00	2× (yellow card) 5× (suspension)	Report	2× (yellow card) 3× (suspension)	Palacio de los Deportes de Torrevieja, Torrevieja; Attendance: 3,875; Referees: Kurtagic, Wetterwik (SWE)

== Tournament 3 ==
Tournament 3
Tournament details
- Host country: Germany
- Venue(s): 1 (in 1 host city)
- Dates: 11–14 April
- Teams: 4 (from 2 confederations)

Tournament statistics
- Matches played: 6
- Goals scored: 322 (53.67 per match)
- Attendance: 22,789 (3,798 per match)
- Top scorer(s): (Slovenia) Ana Gros (21 goals)

The tournament was held in Neu-Ulm, Germany.

=== Standings ===
Pos	Team	Pld	W	D	L	GF	GA	GD	Pts	Qualification
1	Germany (H)	3	3	0	0	96	69	+27	6	2024 Summer Olympics
2	Slovenia	3	2	0	1	87	71	+16	4	2024 Summer Olympics
3	Montenegro	3	1	0	2	80	83	−3	2	
4	Paraguay	3	0	0	3	59	99	−40	0	

Source: IHF
Rules for classification: 1) Points; 2) Head-to-head points; 3) Head-to-head goal difference; 4) Head-to-head goals scored; 5) Goal difference; 6) Goals scored; 7) Draw.
(H) Hosts

=== Matches ===
All times are local (UTC+2).

11 April 2024; 17:45	Germany	31–25	Slovenia	Arena Ulm/Neu-Ulm, Neu-Ulm; Attendance: 4,026; Referees: Lovin, Stancu (ROU)
11 April 2024; 17:45	Maidhof 9	(17–14)	Gros 11	Arena Ulm/Neu-Ulm, Neu-Ulm; Attendance: 4,026; Referees: Lovin, Stancu (ROU)
11 April 2024; 17:45	3× (suspension)	Report	3× (suspension)	Arena Ulm/Neu-Ulm, Neu-Ulm; Attendance: 4,026; Referees: Lovin, Stancu (ROU)

11 April 2024; 20:15	Montenegro	30–25	Paraguay	Arena Ulm/Neu-Ulm, Neu-Ulm; Attendance: 5,500; Referees: Koo, Lee (KOR)
11 April 2024; 20:15	Mugoša 9	(17–12)	Insfrán 9	Arena Ulm/Neu-Ulm, Neu-Ulm; Attendance: 5,500; Referees: Koo, Lee (KOR)
11 April 2024; 20:15	1× (yellow card) 2× (suspension)	Report	1× (yellow card) 2× (suspension)	Arena Ulm/Neu-Ulm, Neu-Ulm; Attendance: 5,500; Referees: Koo, Lee (KOR)

13 April 2024; 14:15	Germany	28–24	Montenegro	Arena Ulm/Neu-Ulm, Neu-Ulm; Attendance: 4,269; Referees: Álvarez, Bustamante (ESP)
13 April 2024; 14:15	Maidhof 9	(11–7)	Pletikosić 9	Arena Ulm/Neu-Ulm, Neu-Ulm; Attendance: 4,269; Referees: Álvarez, Bustamante (ESP)
13 April 2024; 14:15	3× (suspension)	Report	2× (yellow card) 2× (suspension)	Arena Ulm/Neu-Ulm, Neu-Ulm; Attendance: 4,269; Referees: Álvarez, Bustamante (ESP)

13 April 2024; 16:45	Slovenia	32–14	Paraguay	Arena Ulm/Neu-Ulm, Neu-Ulm; Attendance: 1,800; Referees: K. Gasmi, R. Gasmi (FRA)
13 April 2024; 16:45	Mavsar 6	(17–8)	Acuña 4	Arena Ulm/Neu-Ulm, Neu-Ulm; Attendance: 1,800; Referees: K. Gasmi, R. Gasmi (FRA)
13 April 2024; 16:45	4× (suspension)	Report	4× (suspension)	Arena Ulm/Neu-Ulm, Neu-Ulm; Attendance: 1,800; Referees: K. Gasmi, R. Gasmi (FRA)

14 April 2024; 13:30	Paraguay	20–37	Germany	Arena Ulm/Neu-Ulm, Neu-Ulm; Attendance: 4,294; Referees: Lovin, Stancu (ROU)
14 April 2024; 13:30	Insfrán 8	(13–19)	Behrend 6	Arena Ulm/Neu-Ulm, Neu-Ulm; Attendance: 4,294; Referees: Lovin, Stancu (ROU)
14 April 2024; 13:30	1× (yellow card) 3× (suspension)	Report	4× (suspension)	Arena Ulm/Neu-Ulm, Neu-Ulm; Attendance: 4,294; Referees: Lovin, Stancu (ROU)

14 April 2024; 16:00	Montenegro	26–30	Slovenia	Arena Ulm/Neu-Ulm, Neu-Ulm; Attendance: 2,900; Referees: K. Gasmi, R. Gasmi (FRA)
14 April 2024; 16:00	Mugoša 7	(11–14)	Gros, Stanko 7	Arena Ulm/Neu-Ulm, Neu-Ulm; Attendance: 2,900; Referees: K. Gasmi, R. Gasmi (FRA)
14 April 2024; 16:00	1× (yellow card) 5× (suspension)	Report	6× (suspension)	Arena Ulm/Neu-Ulm, Neu-Ulm; Attendance: 2,900; Referees: K. Gasmi, R. Gasmi (FRA)

== See also ==
- 2024 IHF Men's Olympic Qualification Tournaments
