= Rakia (disambiguation) =

Rakia is a popular alcoholic drink in the Balkans

Rakia may also refer to:

- RAKIA, or Ras Al Khaimah Investment Authority, a government-owned entity for promoting incoming investments in the United Arab Emirates
- Rakia Rezgui (born 1996), Tunisian handball player
- "Rakia" is the name of Eytan Stibbe's mission at the International Space Station
- "Rakia Amarga", one of the main characters from the tokusatsu series, Kamen Rider Gavv.
- The Hebrew term for what the King James Bible translates as firmament.
