= Kari Brattset Dale =

Norwegian handball player (born 1991)

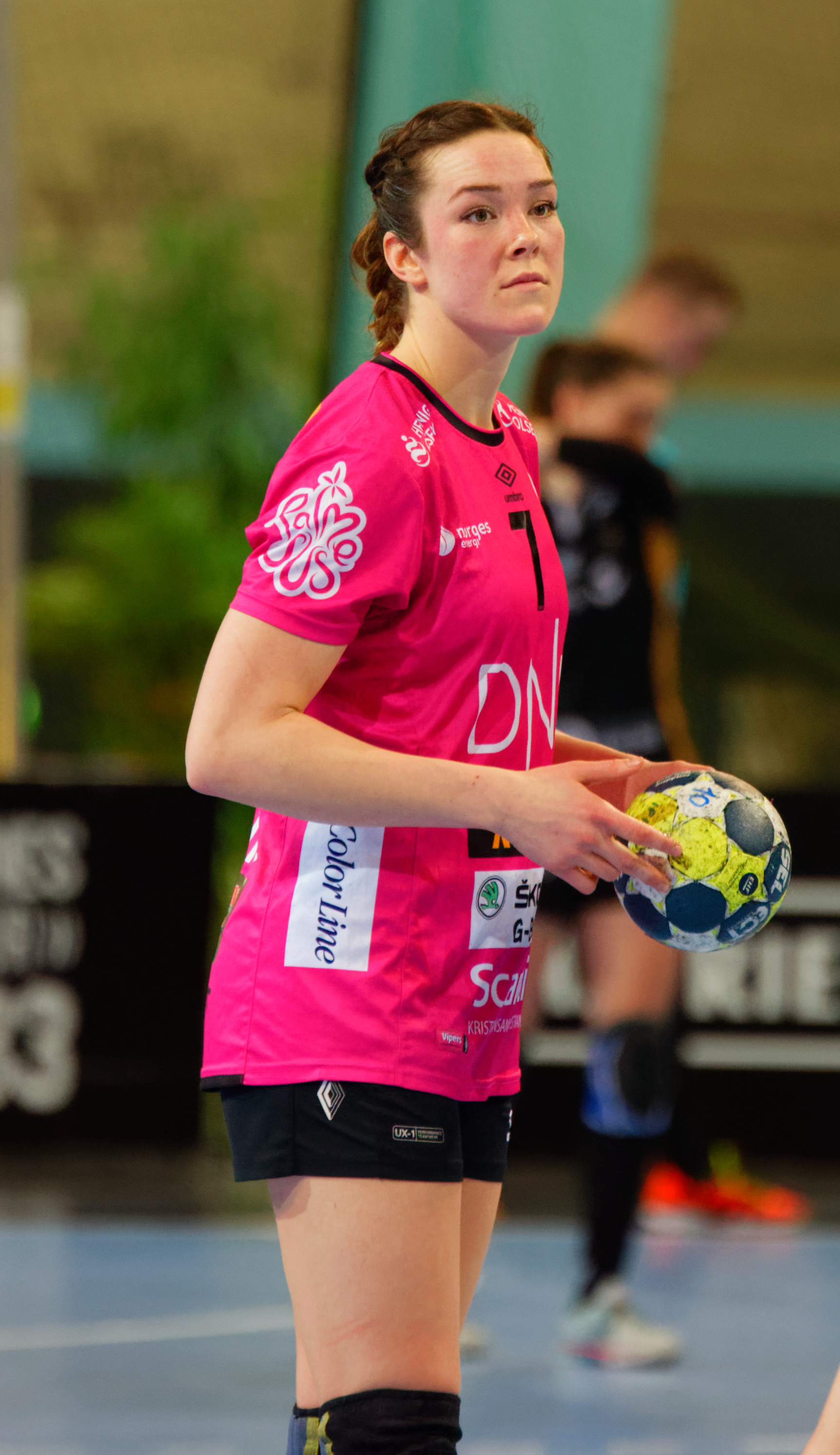
- Brattset Dale in 2018

Personal information
- Full name: Kari Skaar Brattset Dale
- Nationality: Norwegian
- Born: 15 February 1991 (age 35) Fredrikstad, Norway
- Height: 1.83 m (6 ft 0 in)

Sport
- Sport: Handball
- Position: Pivot
- Current club: Győri ETO KC
- Number: 7

Youth career
- Years: Team
- –: Tune IL

Senior clubs
- Years: Team
- 2007–2011: Sarpsborg IL
- 2011–2014: Fredrikstad BK
- 2014–2016: Glassverket IF
- 2016–2018: Vipers Kristiansand
- 2018–: Győri ETO KC
National team
Years	Team	Apps	(Gls)
2016–	Norway	148	(396)
Medal record
Olympic Games
Gold medal – first place	2024 Paris	Team
Bronze medal – third place	2020 Tokyo	Team
World Championship
Gold medal – first place	2021 Spain
Silver medal – second place	2017 Germany
Silver medal – second place	2023 Denmark/Norway/Sweden
European Championship
Gold medal – first place	2020 Denmark
Gold medal – first place	2024 Austria/Hungary/Switzerland

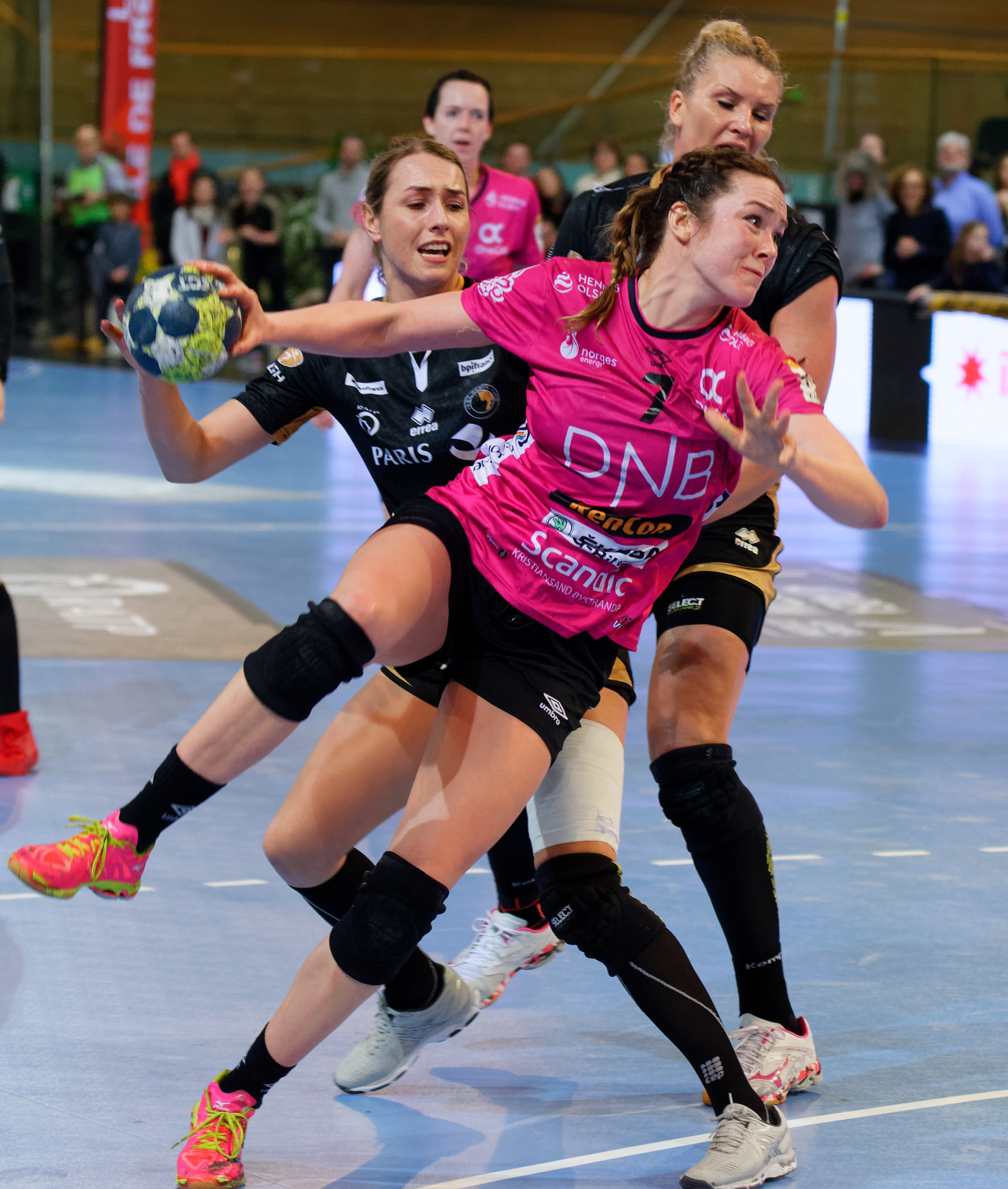
Brattset Dale on 3 February 2018

Kari Brattset Dale (born 15 February 1991) is a Norwegian professional handball player for Győri ETO KC and the Norwegian national team.

== Career ==
Brattset Dale began playing handball at the age of 9 at the club Tune.

In 2007, she joined Sarpsborg IL, where she played until 2011, before joining Fredrikstad BK. Two years later, she joined Glassverket IF, where she played in the highest division in Norway and played in continental competitions.

In 2016, she joined Vipers Kristiansand. Here, she won the Norwegian championship in her first season, which was the first title for the club. She won the Norwegian championship again in 2018, before joining Hungarian side Győri ETO KC. Here, she won the Hungarian championship in 2019, 2022 and 2023. She also won the EHF Champions League in 2019 and 2024.

=== National team ===
She made her debut on the Norwegian national team in March 2016 against Romania.

A year later, she won silver medals at the 2017 World Championship. She also participated at the 2018 European Championship.

Two years later, she won gold medals at the 2020 European Championship. During the tournament, she scored 24 goals.

She won bronze medals at the 2021 Olympics in Tokyo. During the tournament she scored 33 goals. Later the same year, she won gold medals at the 2021 World Championship, and was chosen as the tournament MVP.

Two years later, she won silver medals at the 2023 World Championship, losing to France in the final. She scored 7 goals during the tournament.

At the 2024 Olympics, she won gold medals for a second time in arow, and was selected for the tournament all star team. The same year, she won the 2024 European Championship, beating Denmark in the final.

== Achievements ==
- Olympic Games:
  - Winner: 2024
  - Bronze: 2020
- World Championship:
  - Winner: 2021
  - Silver Medalist: 2017, 2023
- European Championship:
  - Winner: 2020, 2024
- EHF Champions League:
  - Winner: 2019, 2024, 2025
  - Finalist: 2022
  - Bronze: 2021, 2023
- EHF Cup:
  - Finalist: 2018
- Norwegian League:
  - Winner: 2017/2018
  - Silver: 2014/2015, 2016/2017
  - Bronze: 2015/2016
- Norwegian Cup:
  - Winner: 2017
  - Silver: 2015
- Hungarian Championship
  - Winner: 2019, 2022, 2023, 2025, 2026
- Hungarian Cup:
  - Winner: 2019, 2021

== Individual awards ==
- All-Star Line Player of Postenligaen: 2013/2014
- All-Star Line Player of Grundigligaen: 2015/2016, 2016/2017
- All Star Line Player of Eliteserien: 2017/2018
- Best Player of Eliteserien: 2017/2018
- Eliteserien's "public favorite": 2017/2018
- Handball-Planet.com All-Star Line Player of the Year: 2019
- Most Valuable Player of the World Handball Championship: 2021
- Best Defender of the EHF Champions League: 2022
- All-Star Line Player of the Summer Olympics: 2024
- MVP of the EHF Champions League Final Four: 2025
- EHF Excellence Awards: All Star Line Player and Defender of the Season 2024/25

== Personal life ==
On 25 April 2022, Brattset Dale announced her pregnancy. She gave birth to her son, Nils on the 1 November 2022. On 4 September 2025, Brattset Dale announced her second pregnancy. She gave birth to her second son, Martin on 25 February 2026.
