= Réka Bíziková =

Slovak-born Hungarian handball player (born 1991)

Personal information
- Nationality: Slovak/Hungarian
- Born: 21 December 1991 (age 34)
- Height: 1.70 m (5 ft 7 in)

Sport
- Sport: Handball
- Position: Left wing
- Current club: Komárom VSE
National team
Years	Team	Apps	(Gls)
–	Slovakia	80	(197)

Réka Bíziková (born 21 December 1991) is a Slovak-born Hungarian handball player for Komárom VSE. Bízik was born into an ethnic Hungarian family obtained the Hungarian citizenship in January 2018, but has always played for the Slovak national team.

Her sister, Boglárka is also a professional handball player.
