= Yulia Markova =

Russian handball player (born 1996)

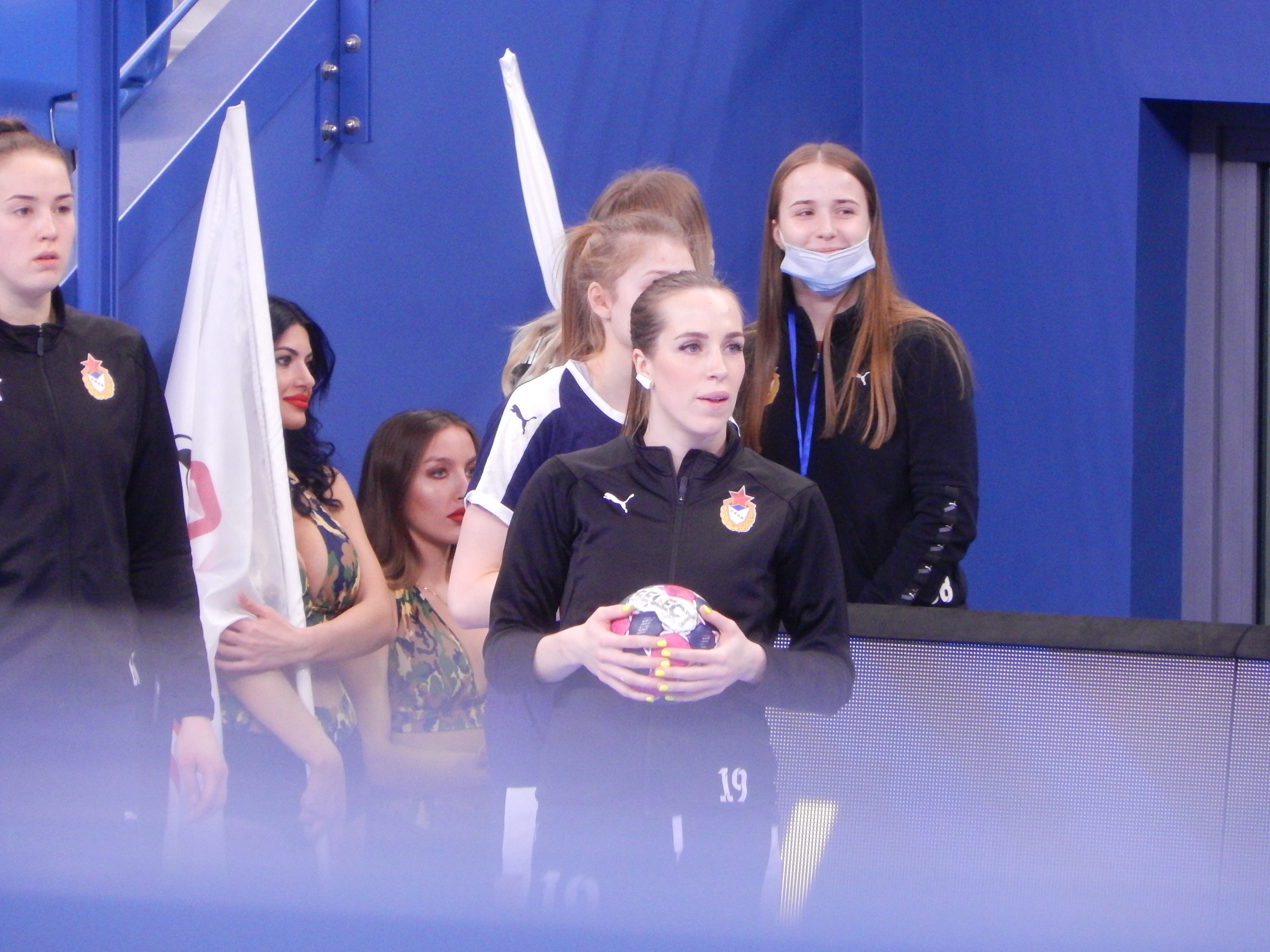

Personal information
- Nationality: Russian
- Born: 10 August 1996 (age 30) Volgograd, Russia
- Height: 1.70 m (5 ft 7 in)

Sport
- Sport: Handball
- Position: Left wing
- Current club: CSKA Moscow
- Number: 19

Senior clubs
- Years: Team
- -2019: HC Dinamo Volgograd
- 2019-: CSKA Moscow
National team
Years	Team	Apps	(Gls)
2017-	Russia	20	(18)
Medal record
Junior World Championship
Silver medal – second place	2016 Russia
European Junior Championship
Silver medal – second place	2015 Spain
European Youth Championship
Silver medal – second place	2013 Poland
Youth Olympic Games
Silver medal – second place	2014 Nanjing
European Youth Olympic Festival
Silver medal – second place	2013 Utrecht
- Updated on 12 May 2023

Yulia Markova (born 10 August 1996) is a Russian handball player for CSKA Moscow and the Russian national team.

== Club career ==
=== Dynamo Volgograd ===
Markova started her handball career at her hometown club HC Dinamo Volgograd, where she won the Russian Championship in the 2013–14. The following seasons the team had to release a lot of key players for economic reasons. At the beginning of the 2017–18, she was elected captain of the team based on seniority, already at the age of 21.

=== CSKA ===
In 2019 she joined CSKA Moscow. Here she won the Russian championship in 2021. The same season they reached the final four of the Champions League, where they lost to eventual winners Vipers Kristiansand. In the following seasons she won the 2022, 2023 and 2024 Russian Championships and the 2023, 2024 and 2025 Russian cup.

== National team ==
Markova played at various Russian youth teams where she won silver medals at the 2013 European Women's U-17 Handball Championship, 2013 European Youth Summer Olympic Festival, 2014 Summer Youth Olympic, 2015 Women's U-19 European Handball Championship, 2016 Women's Junior World Handball Championship.

She made he debut for the Russian senior team in 2017. The same year she was selected to represent Russia at the 2017 World Women's Handball Championship.
