= Patrícia Mihalics =

Austrian handball player (born 1996)

Patrícia Kovács
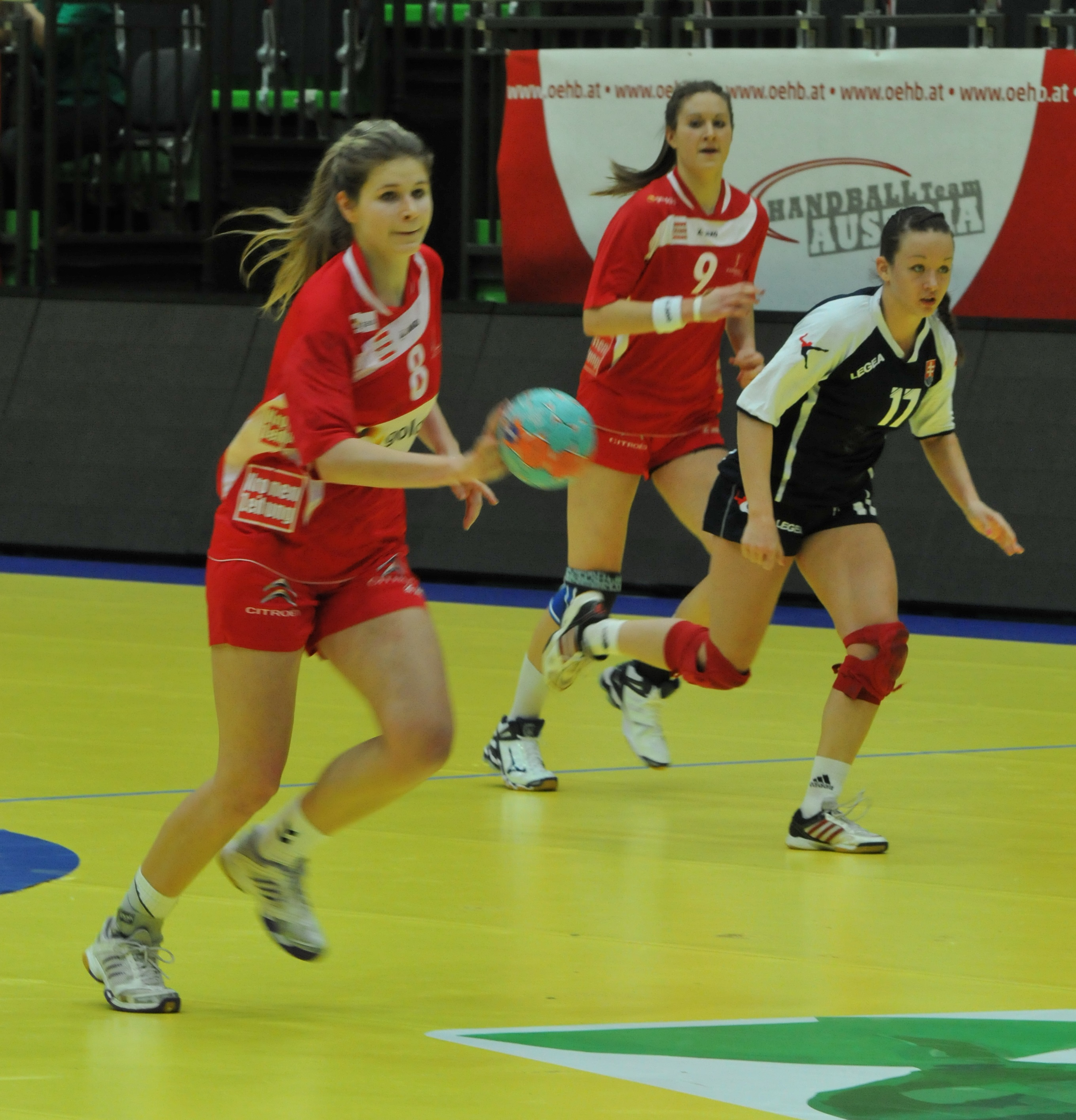

Personal information
- Nationality: Austrian
- Born: 26 May 1996 (age 30) Lustenau, Austria
- Height: 1.78 m (5 ft 10 in)

Sport
- Sport: Handball
- Position: Centre back / left back
- Current club: Hypo Niederösterreich
- Number: 49

Senior clubs
- Years: Team
- 2015–2017: Hypo Niederösterreich
- 2017–2018: Váci NKSE
- 2018–2020: TuS Metzingen
- 2020–2023: Mosonmagyaróvári KC SE
- 2023–: Hypo Niederösterreich
National team
Years	Team	Apps	(Gls)
2015-	Austria	91	(332)
- Updated on 6 November 2024

Patrícia Kovács (born 26 May 1996) is an Austrian handballer for Hypo Niederösterreich and the Austria national team.

== Honours ==
- Handball Liga Austria:
  - Winner: 2016, 2017, 2024, 2025
- Austrian Cup
  - Winner: 2024, 2025

== Personal life ==
She is the daughter of Hypo Niederösterreich's coach, Hungarian Ferenc Kovács, who relocated to Austria. Her sister, Klaudia Kovács, is a handball player as well.
