= Elnaz Ghasemi =

Iranian handball player (born 1996)

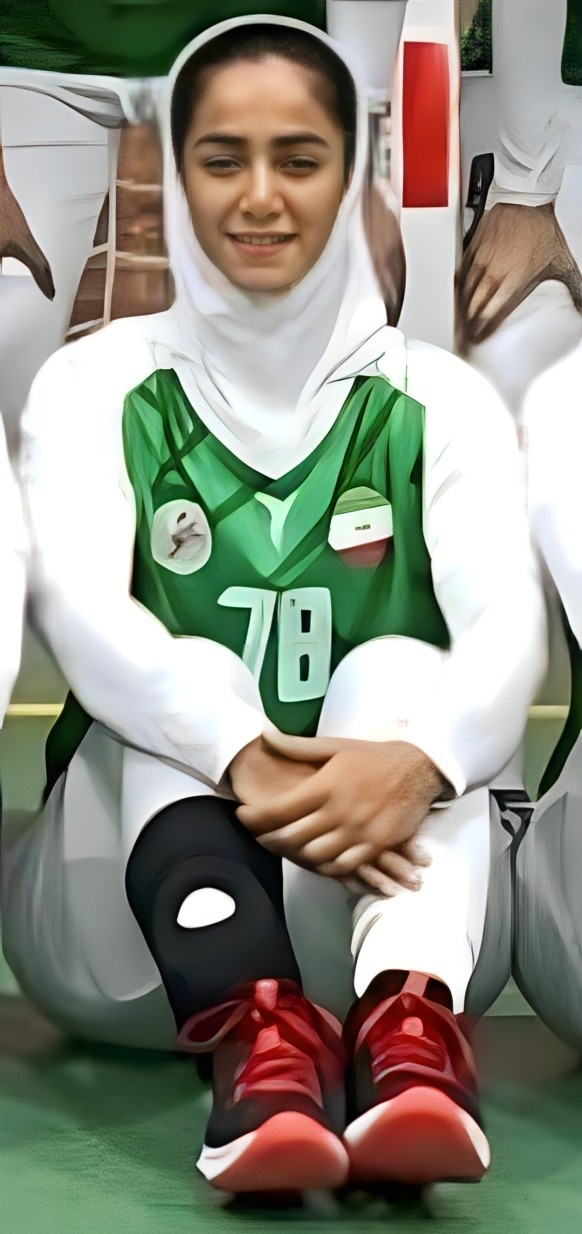

Personal information
- Nationality: Iranian
- Born: 13 January 1996 (age 30) Qom, Iran
- Height: 1.71 m (5 ft 7 in)

Sport
- Sport: Handball
- Position: Pivot, Left winger
- Current club: Antalya Anadolu SK
- Number: 78

Youth career
- Years: Team
- 2010–2013: Hadaf Pouyan Javan

Senior clubs
- Years: Team
- 2013–2017: Hadaf Pouyan Javan
- 2017–2018: Naft va Gaz Gachsaran
- 2018–2019: Shahid Chamran
- 2019–2020: Eshtad Sazeh
- 2020–2021: Sepahan
- 2021–: Antalya Anadolu
National team
Years	Team	Apps	(Gls)
–	Iran	60	(125)

Elnaz Ghasemi (Persian: الناز قاسمی; born 13 January 1996) is an Iranian handball player for Antalya Anadolu SK and the Iranian national team.
