= Julia Maidhof =

German handball player (born 1998)

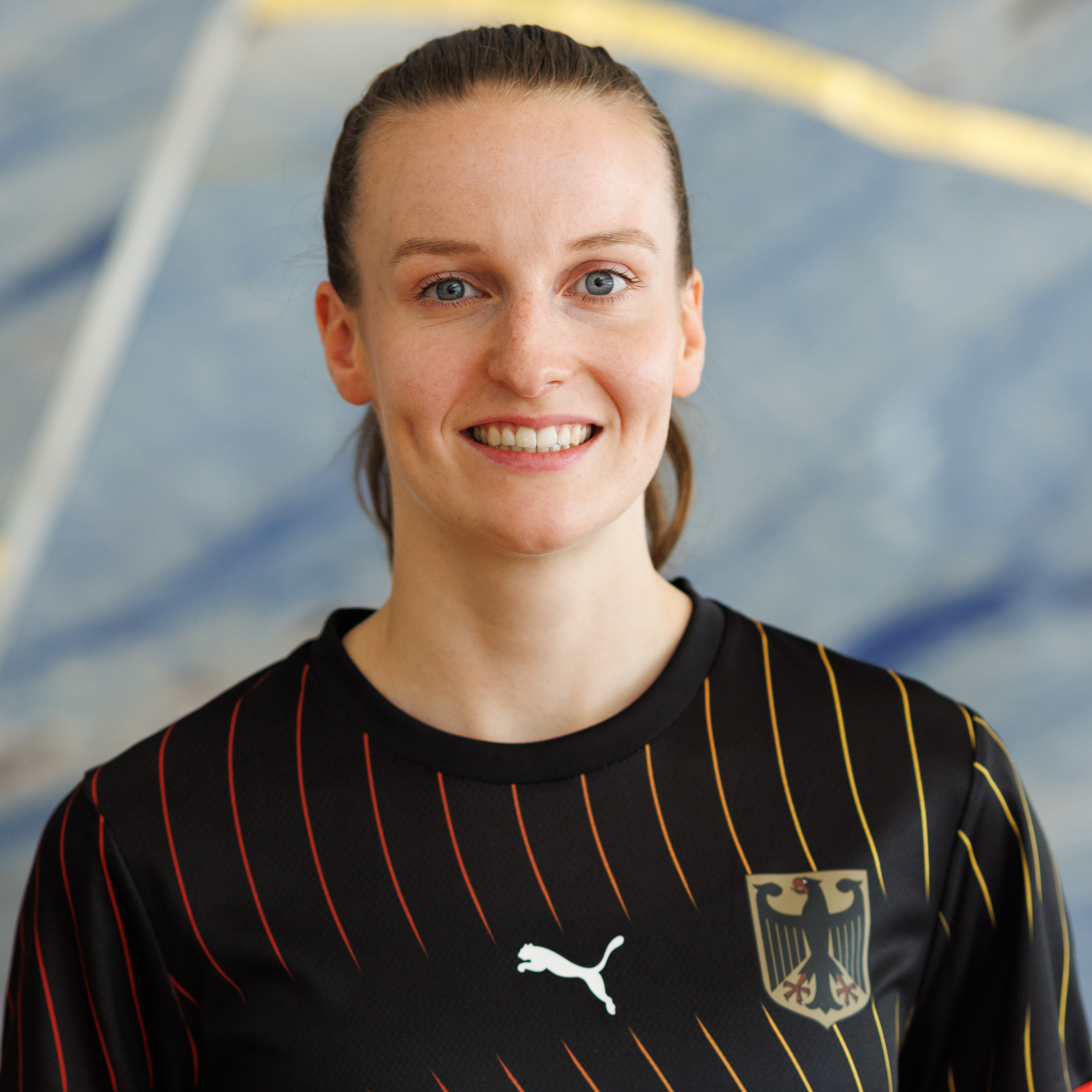

Personal information
- Nationality: German
- Born: 13 March 1998 (age 28) Aschaffenburg, Germany
- Height: 1.76 m (5 ft 9 in)

Sport
- Sport: Handball
- Position: Right back
- Current club: SCM Râmnicu Vâlcea
- Number: 27

Senior clubs
- Years: Team
- –2014: TV Glattbach
- 2014–2020: HSG Bensheim/Auerbach
- 2017–2018: → Mainz 05 (loan)
- 2020–2023: SG BBM Bietigheim
- 2023–: SCM Râmnicu Vâlcea
National team
Years	Team	Apps	(Gls)
2019–	Germany	75	(235)
Medal record
World Championship
Silver medal – second place	2025 Netherlands/Germany
- Updated on 7 november 2025

Julia Maidhof (born 13 March 1998) is a German female handball player for SCM Râmnicu Vâlcea and the German national team.

She represented Germany at the 2020 European Women's Handball Championship.

She also represented Germany at the 2025 World Women's Handball Championship. Here Germany reached the final, where they lost to Norway. This was the first time since 1994 that Germany made the final of a major international tournament and the first time they won a medal since 2007.

== Achievements ==
- World Championship:
  - Silver : 2025
- EHF European League:
  - Winner: 2022
- Bundesliga:
  - Winner: 2022, 2023
