= Rakia Rezgui =

Tunisian handball player

Personal information
- Nationality: Tunisian
- Born: 26 August 1996 (age 30)
- Height: 1.79 m (5 ft 10 in)

Sport
- Sport: Handball
- Position: Pivot
- Current club: Stella Saint-Maur Handball
- Number: 15

Senior clubs
- Years: Team
- -2019: Club Africain
- 2019-2021: HBC Celles-sur-Belle
- 2021-: Stella Saint-Maur Handball
National team
Years	Team	Apps	(Gls)
–	Tunisia	38	(69)
Medal record
African Championship
Bronze medal – third place	2021 Yaoundé
Bronze medal – third place	2024 Kinshasa
- Updated on 8 August 2023

Rakia Rezgui (born 26 August 1996) is a Tunisian handball player for Club Africain and the Tunisian national team.

She participated at the 2015 and 2017 World Women's Handball Championship.
