= Palacio de los Deportes de Torrevieja =

Arena in Torrevieja, Spain

Coordinates: 37.9956°N 0.6754°W

Palacio de los Deportes de Torrevieja is an arena in Torrevieja, Spain, which is primarily used for team handball. It serves as a hub for sports tourism groups to have training in multiple disciplines. The arena has a capacity of 4,500 people, and is also the home arena for CB Torrevieja.
