= 2023 World Women's Handball Championship squads =

The following is a list of squads for each nation competing at the 2023 World Women's Handball Championship. Each team had a provisional list of 35 players. Each roster consists of 18 players, of whom 16 may be fielded for each match.

Age, club, caps and goals as of 29 November 2023.

== Group A ==
=== China ===
Head coach: Zheng Yongli

No.	Pos.	Name	Date of birth (age)	Height	App.	Goals	Club
1	GK	Lu Chang	6 April 1998 (aged 25)	1.86 m	30	0	(China) Shandong Handball
4	RB	Sun Yukun	3 March 2002 (aged 21)	1.80 m	0	0	(China) Shandong Handball
5	CB	Wang Jiayi	2 August 1999 (aged 24)	1.70 m	4	2	(China) Shanghai Handball
7	P	Jiang Yishan	22 March 2006 (aged 17)	1.87 m	0	0	(China) Jiangsu Handball
11	RB	Liu Chan	10 August 1998 (aged 25)	1.80 m	100	143	(China) Shandong Handball
12	LB	Li Xiaoqing	22 December 1995 (aged 27)	1.77 m	100	300	(China) Guangdong Handball
13	LW	Zhao Xinyao	17 May 2002 (aged 21)	1.76 m	3	1	(China) Shandong Handball
14	LB	Zhou Mengxue	20 February 2000 (aged 23)	1.75 m	45	111	(China) Anhui Handball
17	GK	Hu Yunuo	26 August 2000 (aged 23)	1.76 m	5	0	(China) Jiangsu Handball
18	CB	Wei Nana	3 March 1999 (aged 24)	1.72 m	1	1	(China) Guangdong Handball
21	P	Zhang Guisi	2 February 2003 (aged 20)	1.74 m	0	0	(China) Anhui Handball
22	RW	Ma Jie	17 September 2003 (aged 20)	1.67 m	0	0	(China) Beijing Handball
23	RW	Zhuang Hongyan	26 March 2004 (aged 19)	1.59 m	5	10	(China) Jiangsu Handball
27	P	Gong Lei	23 January 2000 (aged 23)	1.81 m	20	16	(China) Shandong Handball
28	CB	Liu Xuedan	13 October 2005 (aged 18)	1.72 m	1	0	(China) Anhui Handball
34	CB	Jin Mengqing	29 May 1995 (aged 28)	1.72 m	75	180	(China) Jiangsu Handball
53	LW	Liu Yuting	18 July 2004 (aged 19)	1.68 m	4	4	(China) Anhui Handball

=== Croatia ===
A 22-player squad was announced on 7 November 2023. It was reduced to 20 players on 28 November 2023.

Head coach: Ivica Obrvan

No.	Pos.	Name	Date of birth (age)	Height	App.	Goals	Club
1	GK	Lucija Bešen	29 March 1998 (aged 25)	1.80 m	37	1	(Croatia) RK Podravka Koprivnica
2	RW	Nikolina Zadravec	2 September 1997 (aged 26)	1.68 m	24	33	(Croatia) RK Podravka Koprivnica
3	LW	Paula Posavec	26 August 1996 (aged 27)	1.70 m	71	98	(Romania) Gloria Bistrița-Năsăud
6	P	Sara Šenvald	14 March 1996 (aged 27)	1.85 m	17	12	(Croatia) RK Podravka Koprivnica
8	CB	Stela Posavec	26 August 1996 (aged 27)	1.65 m	60	114	(Poland) MKS Lublin
9	LB	Ćamila Mičijević	8 September 1994 (aged 29)	1.95 m	53	174	(France) Paris 92
10	CB	Dejana Milosavljević	23 November 1994 (aged 29)	1.73 m	26	57	(Romania) SCM Craiova
14	LB	Larissa Kalaus	24 June 1996 (aged 27)	1.73 m	43	110	(Croatia) RK Podravka Koprivnica
17	P	Katarina Ježić	19 December 1992 (aged 30)	1.73 m	103	213	(Romania) HC Dunărea Brăila
23	RB	Katarina Pavlović	30 January 1995 (aged 28)	1.80 m	15	64	(Romania) CS Minaur Baia Mare
25	RW	Lara Burić	13 August 2003 (aged 20)	1.69 m	15	17	(Croatia) RK Lokomotiva Zagreb
26	P	Mia Brkić	11 May 2003 (aged 20)	1.80 m	0	0	(France) Metz Handball
28	LW	Andrea Šimara	13 July 1997 (aged 26)	1.70 m	38	47	(Croatia) RK Podravka Koprivnica
38	LB	Tina Barišić	30 October 2000 (aged 23)	1.85 m	10	13	(Croatia) RK Podravka Koprivnica
43	RB	Klara Birtić	28 March 2002 (aged 21)	1.82 m	2	8	(Germany) SG BBM Bietigheim
77	CB	Valentina Blažević	14 February 1994 (aged 29)	1.70 m	63	167	(Romania) Gloria Buzău
88	LB	Kristina Prkačin	21 October 1997 (aged 26)	1.83 m	30	19	(Croatia) RK Lokomotiva Zagreb
91	GK	Tea Pijević	18 November 1991 (aged 32)	1.72 m	55	2	(Romania) Gloria Buzău

=== Senegal ===
The squad was announced on 18 November 2023.

Head coach: (France) Yacine Messaoudi

No.	Pos.	Name	Date of birth (age)	Height	App.	Goals	Club
1	GK	Fama Sall	18 October 2000 (aged 23)	1.72 m	0	0	(Senegal) DIISOO
7	LB	Doungou Camara	7 January 1995 (aged 28)	1.68 m	34	71	(Egypt) Al Ahly
10	LW	Aminata Cissokho	1 June 2001 (aged 22)	1.75 m	0	0	(France) Paris 92
13	CB	Soukeina Sagna	17 April 1998 (aged 25)	1.70 m	15	20	(France) Handball Plan-de-Cuques
14	RB	Fanta Keïta	17 October 1995 (aged 28)	1.76 m	22	43	(Romania) SCM Gloria Buzău
15	P	Hawa N'Diaye	24 July 1995 (aged 28)	1.76 m	22	84	(Romania) SCM Gloria Buzău
16	GK	Justicia Toubissa	16 July 2001 (aged 22)	1.73 m	15	0	(France) Sambre-Avesnois Handball
19	RW	Khady Seck	10 March 2000 (aged 23)	1.69 m	7	4	(Tunisia) Club Africain
21	LW	Mathita Diawara	21 January 2003 (aged 20)	1.75 m	0	0	(France) OGC Nice
27	LB	Dienaba Sy	27 June 1995 (aged 28)	1.66 m	11	8	(France) OGC Nice
28	P	Laura Kamdop	14 September 1990 (aged 33)	1.82 m	9	6	(France) USM Montargis Handball
31	P	Marie Fall	2 April 1998 (aged 25)	1.85 m	0	0	(France) OGC Nice
44	RW	Raïssa Dapina	27 September 1995 (aged 28)	1.75 m	22	57	(France) OGC Nice
55	GK	Ndeye Sene	12 February 1997 (aged 26)	1.90 m	0	0	(Senegal) Golf Handball Club
77	CB	Sophie Kebe	29 July 2001 (aged 22)	1.70 m	6	3	(France) Palente Besançon Handball
92	LB	Coura Camara	1 March 1999 (aged 24)	1.80 m	0	0	(France) Cesson Rennes MHB

=== Sweden ===
An 18-player squad was announced on 27 October 2023. On 9 December Carin Strömberg replaced Daniela de Jong due to a hand fracture.

Head coach: Tomas Axnér

No.	Pos.	Name	Date of birth (age)	Height	App.	Goals	Club
1	GK	Johanna Bundsen	3 June 1991 (aged 32)	1.85 m	132	2	(Sweden) IK Sävehof
3	RB	Nina Koppang	31 May 2002 (aged 21)	1.78 m	15	18	(Sweden) IK Sävehof
4	LW	Olivia Mellegård	17 June 1996 (aged 27)	1.77 m	73	155	(Sweden) IK Sävehof
6	CB	Carin Strömberg	10 July 1993 (aged 30)	1.84 m	138	207	(France) Neptunes de Nantes
7	P	Linn Blohm	20 May 1992 (aged 31)	1.80 m	152	439	(Hungary) Győri Audi ETO KC
8	LB	Jamina Roberts	28 May 1990 (aged 33)	1.76 m	218	543	(Norway) Vipers Kristiansand
10	RW	Mathilda Lundström	20 December 1996 (aged 26)	1.65 m	65	89	(Denmark) Silkeborg-Voel KFUM
12	GK	Irma Schjött	18 November 1998 (aged 25)	1.79 m	7	0	(Denmark) Ikast Håndbold
17	RB	Nina Dano	12 June 2000 (aged 23)	1.72 m	40	77	(Denmark) Odense Håndbold
19	P	Anna Lagerquist	16 October 1993 (aged 30)	1.75 m	108	126	(France) Neptunes de Nantes
21	GK	Evelina Eriksson	20 August 1996 (aged 27)	1.84 m	17	1	(Romania) CSM București
23	CB	Emma Lindqvist	17 September 1997 (aged 26)	1.77 m	74	151	(Denmark) Ikast Håndbold
24	RW	Nathalie Hagman	19 July 1991 (aged 32)	1.67 m	205	744	(Romania) SCM Râmnicu Vâlcea
29	LB	Kristin Thorleifsdóttir	13 January 1998 (aged 25)	1.82 m	44	51	(Denmark) HH Elite
35	P	Sofia Hvenfelt	23 April 1996 (aged 27)	1.80 m	12	10	(Germany) SG BBM Bietigheim
38	LW	Elin Hansson	7 August 1996 (aged 27)	1.73 m	58	150	(Denmark) HH Elite
42	CB	Jenny Carlson	17 April 1995 (aged 28)	1.72 m	45	122	(France) Brest Bretagne
44	CB	Daniela de Jong	1 September 1998 (aged 25)	1.77 m	17	22	(Romania) SCM Râmnicu Vâlcea
54	LB	Tyra Axnér	18 March 2002 (aged 21)	1.78 m	20	33	(Denmark) Nykøbing Falster Håndboldklub

== Group B ==
=== Cameroon ===
A 22-player squad was announced on 27 October 2023.

Head coach: Bertin Njantou Tabeth

No.	Pos.	Name	Date of birth (age)	Height	App.	Goals	Club
1	GK	Noëlle Mben	5 January 1998 (aged 25)	1.76 m	56	0	(Turkey) Yenimahalle Bld. SK
2	CB	Sonia Nnomo	19 February 1998 (aged 25)	1.60 m	10	5	(Cameroon) Fanz Yaoundé
3	RB	Brenda-Sherryl Attisso	25 May 1999 (aged 24)	1.70 m	0	0	(France) Rueil AC Handball
4	CB	Génie Feudjié	27 March 1993 (aged 30)	1.66 m	30	0	(Cameroon) Tonnerre Yaoundé
5	RW	Anne Essam	7 May 1995 (aged 28)	1.62 m	0	0	(Cameroon) Tonnerre Yaoundé
6	RW	Yolande Touba	18 July 1993 (aged 30)	1.62 m	60	0
7	LB	Laëticia Ateba	1 December 2001 (aged 21)	1.76 m	38	28	(Cameroon) Fanz Yaoundé
8	LB	Sifan Kongnyuy	15 September 1990 (aged 33)	1.70 m	0	0	(Cameroon) FAP Yaoundé
9	RB	Chantal Voulania	8 November 2003 (aged 20)	1.66 m	0	0	(Cameroon) Fanz Yaoundé
11	P	Vicky Nyamsi	20 November 1996 (aged 27)	1.80 m	0	0	(Cameroon) Fanz Yaoundé
12	LW	Issa Haoua	20 September 2002 (aged 21)	1.73 m	0	0	(Cameroon) Fanz Yaoundé
15	RB	Paola Ébanga Baboga	6 April 1997 (aged 26)	1.84 m	13	41	(France) HBC Celles-sur-Belle
17	LB	Vanessa Nchouapouognigni	21 December 1992 (aged 30)	1.84 m	40	0	(France) Rouen Handball
22	GK	Marie Balana	24 September 1995 (aged 28)	1.75 m	16	0	(Cameroon) FAP Yaoundé

=== Hungary ===
A 20-player squad was announced on 26 October 2023. The final roster was revealed on 16 November 2023.

Head coach: Vladimir Golovin

No.	Pos.	Name	Date of birth (age)	Height	App.	Goals	Club
4	P	Petra Füzi-Tóvizi	15 March 1999 (aged 24)	1.78 m	61	71	(Hungary) Debreceni VSC
6	LW	Nadine Szöllősi-Schatzl	19 November 1993 (aged 30)	1.74 m	100	240	(Hungary) Győri Audi ETO KC
11	RB	Anna Albek	2 December 2001 (aged 21)	1.89 m	20	14	(Hungary) Mosonmagyaróvári KC SE
15	LB	Kinga Debreczeni-Klivinyi	31 March 1992 (aged 31)	1.75 m	68	166	(Hungary) Moyra-Budaörs Handball
16	GK	Blanka Böde-Bíró	22 September 1994 (aged 29)	1.87 m	106	2	(Hungary) Ferencvárosi TC
19	LW	Gréta Márton	3 October 1999 (aged 24)	1.73 m	66	161	(Hungary) Ferencvárosi TC
24	RW	Alexandra Töpfner	8 February 1996 (aged 27)	1.73 m	15	13	(Hungary) Debreceni VSC
28	RB	Nikolett Papp	23 July 1996 (aged 27)	1.70 m	32	44	(Romania) SCM Gloria Buzău
31	GK	Zsófi Szemerey	2 June 1994 (aged 29)	1.82 m	14	0	(Hungary) Mosonmagyaróvári KC SE
32	P	Noémi Pásztor	2 April 1999 (aged 24)	1.83 m	23	21	(Hungary) Mosonmagyaróvári KC SE
38	CB	Petra Vámos	14 September 2000 (aged 23)	1.75 m	53	136	(Hungary) Debreceni VSC
42	RB	Katrin Klujber	21 April 1999 (aged 24)	1.70 m	65	336	(Hungary) Ferencvárosi TC
52	LB	Gréta Juhász	16 March 2002 (aged 21)	1.80 m	7	14	(Hungary) Kisvárdai KC
58	P	Réka Bordás	26 August 1997 (aged 26)	1.85 m	42	46	(Hungary) Ferencvárosi TC
59	CB	Csenge Kuczora	26 January 2000 (aged 23)	1.76 m	23	69	(Hungary) Váci NKSE
66	RW	Viktória Győri-Lukács	31 October 1995 (aged 28)	1.68 m	107	291	(Hungary) Győri Audi ETO KC
74	GK	Anna Bukovszky	30 June 2002 (aged 21)	1.75 m	3	0	(Hungary) Váci NKSE
77	CB	Petra Simon	12 November 2004 (aged 19)	1.68 m	4	13	(Hungary) Ferencvárosi TC

=== Montenegro ===
A 19-player squad was announced on 19 November 2023.

Head coach: Bojana Popović

No.	Pos.	Name	Date of birth (age)	Height	App.	Goals	Club
1	GK	Marina Rajčić	24 August 1993 (aged 30)	1.78 m	147	4	(Romania) CS Măgura Cisnădie
2	RW	Anastasija Marsenić	24 February 2004 (aged 19)	1.72 m	7	25	(Montenegro) ŽRK Budućnost
10	CB	Matea Pletikosić	24 April 1998 (aged 25)	1.68 m	38	40	(Romania) CSM Corona Brașov
11	P	Ivana Godeč	11 May 2001 (aged 22)	1.82 m	13	8	(Montenegro) ŽRK Budućnost
13	LW	Dijana Mugoša	22 October 1995 (aged 28)	1.69 m	25	18	(Romania) SCM Craiova
15	RB	Jelena Vukčević	11 December 2004 (aged 18)	1.70 m	0	0	(Montenegro) ŽRK Budućnost
21	LB	Nada Ćorović	16 December 2000 (aged 22)	1.78 m	2	4	(France) ESBF Besançon
22	LB	Andrijana Popović	20 April 2002 (aged 21)	1.85 m	12	20	(Montenegro) ŽRK Budućnost
24	RB	Tanja Ivanović	5 November 1996 (aged 27)	1.83 m	6	3	(Montenegro) ŽRK Budućnost
25	RB	Đurđina Malović	5 May 1996 (aged 27)	1.82 m	41	58	(Romania) SCM Craiova
26	CB	Nataša Ćorović	7 May 1999 (aged 24)	1.70 m	14	5	(Germany) BSV Sachsen Zwickau
34	P	Tatjana Brnović	9 November 1998 (aged 25)	1.84 m	61	149	(Slovenia) RK Krim
37	RW	Nina Bulatović	9 December 1996 (aged 26)	1.72 m	18	13	(Romania) CS Gloria Bistrița-Năsăud
43	GK	Marta Batinović	20 April 1990 (aged 33)	1.88 m	35	1	(Romania) CS Măgura Cisnădie
71	P	Bobana Klikovac	19 July 1995 (aged 28)	1.81 m	27	16	(Romania) CSM Corona Brașov
80	LB	Jelena Despotović	30 April 1994 (aged 29)	1.83 m	88	86	(Hungary) Ferencvárosi TC
91	LW	Ivona Pavićević	21 April 1996 (aged 27)	1.67 m	68	80	(Montenegro) ŽRK Budućnost
96	CB	Itana Grbić	1 September 1996 (aged 27)	1.69 m	87	176	(Slovenia) RK Krim

=== Paraguay ===
A 28-player squad was announced on 6 November 2023. The final roster was revealed on 24 November 2023.

Head coach: Marizza Faría

No.	Pos.	Name	Date of birth (age)	Height	App.	Goals	Club
2	LW	Fátima Acuña	14 August 1999 (aged 24)	1.78 m	107	164	(Spain) Club Adesal Córdoba
3	P	Ada Miskinich	28 April 1995 (aged 28)	1.79 m	30	16	(Paraguay) Cerro Porteño
4	RB	Fernanda Insfrán	7 February 1998 (aged 25)	1.58 m	80	300	(Spain) Lanzarote Puerto del Carmen
6	RW	Jazmín Mendoza	27 May 2002 (aged 21)	1.64 m	40	60	(Spain) CB San José Obrero
7	P	Karina dos Santos	1 April 1985 (aged 38)	1.82 m	162	77	(Paraguay) Cerro Porteño
8	RW	Kiara Vergara	12 May 2002 (aged 21)	1.58 m	30	12	(Paraguay) Cerro Porteño
11	CB	Delyne Leiva	27 March 1998 (aged 25)	1.59 m	87	117	(Spain) Lanzarote Puerto del Carmen
12	GK	Fátima Ocampos	3 January 2003 (aged 20)	1.80 m	20	5	(Paraguay) Cerro Porteño
14	LB	María Paula Fernández	30 August 1998 (aged 25)	1.54 m	90	165	(Spain) CB Atlético Guardés
15	LW	Belinda Bobadilla	22 April 2003 (aged 20)	1.53 m	70	40	(Brazil) Associacao Cascavelense De Handebol
18	P	Maggie Lugo	8 April 1994 (aged 29)	1.73 m	30	20	(Paraguay) Club Deportivo Internacional
20	CB	Ana Cristaldo	3 February 1990 (aged 33)	1.71 m	80	72	(Paraguay) Club Deportivo Internacional
24	LW	Ariana Portillo	17 August 2001 (aged 22)	1.66 m	50	40	(Spain) BM Granollers
25	GK	María Machucha	23 October 1994 (aged 29)	1.76 m	100	12	(Spain) BM Ciudad Imperial
28	LB	Milagros Samaniego	18 March 2006 (aged 17)	1.76 m	10	8	(Paraguay) Cerro Porteño

== Group C ==
=== Austria ===
The squad was announced on 9 November.

Head coach: (Germany) Herbert Müller

No.	Pos.	Name	Date of birth (age)	Height	App.	Goals	Club
1	GK	Lena Ivančok	29 March 2001 (aged 22)	1.75 m	33	2	(Germany) Neckarsulmer SU
3	LB	Katarina Pandza	17 April 2002 (aged 21)	1.79 m	27	94	(Croatia) RK Podravka Koprivnica
5	CB	Sonja Frey	22 April 1993 (aged 30)	1.69 m	109	537	(Germany) Thüringer HC
6	LW	Mirela Dedic	15 December 1991 (aged 31)	1.69 m	78	132	(Austria) Hypo Niederösterreich
9	CB	Patricia Kovács	26 May 1996 (aged 27)	1.78 m	74	278	(Austria) Hypo Niederösterreich
15	RW	Claudia Wess	15 June 1995 (aged 28)	1.81 m	77	64	(Austria) Hypo Niederösterreich
16	GK	Petra Blazek	15 June 1987 (aged 36)	1.82 m	221	3	(Austria) Hypo Niederösterreich
18	RB	Kristina Dramac	9 January 2002 (aged 21)	1.80 m	24	20	(Croatia) RK Lokomotiva Zagreb
19	RW	Lilli Gschwentner	15 March 2003 (aged 20)	1.66 m	4	0	(Austria) WAT Atzgersdorf
22	P	Stefanie Kaiser	31 October 1992 (aged 31)	1.81 m	90	131	(Germany) HSG Blomberg-Lippe
29	LB	Ines Ivančok	14 April 1998 (aged 25)	1.80 m	57	173	(Hungary) Mosonmagyaróvári KC SE
44	P	Nora Leitner	5 May 2002 (aged 21)	1.77 m	18	21	(Austria) Hypo Niederösterreich
54	LW	Santina Sabatnig	4 January 2004 (aged 19)	1.73 m	14	6	(Germany) HC Rödertal
57	LB	Josefine Huber	19 February 1996 (aged 27)	1.80 m	52	132	(Germany) Thüringer HC
64	CB	Ana Pandza	24 December 2003 (aged 19)	1.68 m	15	10	(Croatia) RK Podravka Koprivnica
67	LB	Johanna Reichert	31 December 2001 (aged 21)	1.78 m	31	73	(Germany) Thüringer HC

=== Greenland ===
The squad was announced on 1 November 2023.

Head coach: (Denmark) Anders Friis

No.	Pos.	Name	Date of birth (age)	Height	App.	Goals	Club
2	RW	Nuunu Lukassen	6 November 1999 (aged 24)	1.64 m	9	18	(Denmark) Ejstrup/Hærvejen
3	LW	Andrea Heilmann	21 February 1988 (aged 35)	1.64 m	20	8	(Greenland) GSS Nuuk
4	RW	Anja Heilmann	5 January 1997 (aged 26)	1.74 m	34	97	(Greenland) GSS Nuuk
5	P	Ivâna Meincke	7 August 1995 (aged 28)	1.68 m	10	15	(Iceland) Stjarnan
7	LW	Aviana Kâjangmat	25 February 2000 (aged 23)	1.68 m	4	16	(Denmark) Silkeborg-Voel KFUM 2
8	RW	Ane-Sofiannguaq Frederiksen	25 October 2001 (aged 22)	1.65 m	5	5	(Denmark) Silkeborg-Voel KFUM 2
10	RB	Josefine Gadgaard	12 July 1994 (aged 29)	1.69 m	11	28	(Denmark) Ejstrup/Hærvejen
12	GK	Nivi Fly	3 August 1989 (aged 34)	1.69 m	20	0	(Greenland) GSS Nuuk
13	LB	Ivalu Bjerge	13 September 2000 (aged 23)	1.71 m	14	37	(Denmark) NSK Håndbold
14	LB	Nivi Petersen	22 April 2000 (aged 23)	1.71 m	5	5	(Denmark) Silkeborg-Voel KFUM 2
15	P	Sandra Rothberg	1 December 2000 (aged 22)	1.86 m	14	32	(Greenland) GSS Nuuk
16	GK	Rina Møller Lorentzen	16 February 1991 (aged 32)	1.82 m	19	0	(Greenland) GSS Nuuk
17	LB	Lykke Frank Hansen	8 January 1988 (aged 35)	1.80 m	24	37	(Denmark) Fredericia HK
18	GK	Aviaja Heilmann	26 January 1989 (aged 34)	1.66 m	24	0	(Greenland) GSS Nuuk
19	P	Nukaaka Lyberth	25 March 2001 (aged 22)	1.68 m	5	6	(Faroe Islands) Eiðis Bóltfelag
21	LB	Aili Pedersen	27 January 1993 (aged 30)	1.84 m	6	1	(Greenland) GSS Nuuk
26	P	Ivaana Holm	16 July 1990 (aged 33)	1.70 m	21	24	(Greenland) GSS Nuuk
79	LW	Sascha Jordening Zeeb	31 October 1990 (aged 33)	1.70 m	10	15	(Greenland) GSS Nuuk

=== Norway ===
An 18/19-player squad was announced on 7 November 2023. On 25 November, Silje Solberg-Østhassel was added to the squad. On 27 November, Eli Marie Raasok was cut from the squad. On 3 December, Katrine Lunde replaced Marie Davidsen in the squad.

Head coach: (Iceland) Þórir Hergeirsson

No.	Pos.	Name	Date of birth (age)	Height	App.	Goals	Club
1	GK	Marie Davidsen	20 August 1993 (aged 30)	1.78 m	14	0	(Romania) CSM București
6	P	Maren Nyland Aardahl	2 March 1994 (aged 29)	1.83 m	36	65	(Denmark) Odense Håndbold
7	RB/RW	Stine Skogrand	3 March 1993 (aged 30)	1.73 m	130	223	(Denmark) Ikast Håndbold
9	RB	Nora Mørk	5 April 1991 (aged 32)	1.69 m	173	846	(Denmark) Team Esbjerg
10	CB	Stine Bredal Oftedal (c)	25 September 1991 (aged 32)	1.68 m	247	688	(Hungary) Győri Audi ETO KC
12	GK	Silje Solberg-Østhassel	16 June 1990 (aged 33)	1.78 m	193	8	(Hungary) Győri Audi ETO KC
13	P	Kari Brattset Dale	15 February 1991 (aged 32)	1.84 m	109	289	(Hungary) Győri Audi ETO KC
14	LB	Kristine Breistøl	23 August 1993 (aged 30)	1.91 m	63	83	(Denmark) Team Esbjerg
15	P	Vilde Ingstad	18 December 1994 (aged 28)	1.80 m	116	167	(Romania) CSM București
16	GK	Katrine Lunde	30 March 1980 (aged 43)	1.81 m	343	3	(Norway) Vipers Kristiansand
21	LB	Ingvild Bakkerud	9 July 1995 (aged 28)	1.83 m	40	64	(Denmark) Ikast Håndbold
22	RB	Kristina Novak	29 August 2000 (aged 23)	1.76 m	20	34	(Norway) Sola HK
23	LW	Camilla Herrem	8 October 1986 (aged 37)	1.67 m	294	843	(Norway) Sola HK
24	LW	Sanna Solberg-Isaksen	16 June 1990 (aged 33)	1.78 m	188	360	(Denmark) Team Esbjerg
25	CB	Henny Reistad	9 February 1999 (aged 24)	1.81 m	70	272	(Denmark) Team Esbjerg
26	RW	Emilie Hovden	5 April 1996 (aged 27)	1.63 m	25	58	(Hungary) Győri Audi ETO KC
30	LB	Maja Furu Sæteren	14 May 2003 (aged 20)	1.72 m	3	3	(Norway) Larvik HK
32	GK	Olivia Lykke Nygaard	14 September 2001 (aged 22)	1.80 m	6	1	(Norway) Storhamar HE
33	LB	Thale Rushfeldt Deila	15 January 2000 (aged 23)	1.78 m	24	43	(Denmark) Odense Håndbold

=== South Korea ===
A 17-player squad was announced on 13 November 2023.

Head coach: (Sweden) Henrik Signell

No.	Pos.	Name	Date of birth (age)	Height	App.	Goals	Club
6	RW	Song Ji-young	5 May 1995 (aged 28)	1.64 m	13	20	(South Korea) Seoul City
7	LW	Shin Eun-joo	9 September 1993 (aged 30)	1.70 m	14	29	(South Korea) Incheon City
11	RB	Ryu Eun-hee	24 February 1990 (aged 33)	1.79 m	89	323	(Hungary) Győri Audi ETO KC
12	GK	Jeong Jin-hui	24 March 1999 (aged 24)	1.80 m	17	0	(South Korea) Seoul City
16	GK	Park Sae-young	11 August 1994 (aged 29)	1.76 m	15	0	(South Korea) Wonderful Samcheok
17	LB	Jo Su-yeon	6 July 1994 (aged 29)	1.72 m	19	15	(South Korea) Seoul City
19	P	Kang Eun-hye	17 April 1996 (aged 27)	1.86 m	14	33	(South Korea) SK Sugar Gliders
20	CB	Jo Eunbeen	18 April 2001 (aged 22)	1.63 m	0	0	(South Korea) Korea National Sports University
22	CB	Woo Bit-na	23 October 2001 (aged 22)	1.72 m	8	12	(South Korea) Seoul City
26	RB	Kang Eunseo	4 March 1999 (aged 24)	1.69 m	0	0	(South Korea) Wonderful Samcheok
27	RW	Jeon Ji-yeon	2 May 2003 (aged 20)	1.68 m	7	14	(South Korea) Wonderful Samcheok
29	LW	Yun Ye-jin	3 November 2000 (aged 23)	1.63 m	7	9	(South Korea) Seoul City
31	P	Gim Bo-eun	8 December 1997 (aged 25)	1.77 m	7	6	(South Korea) Wonderful Samcheok
33	CB	Shin Jin-mi	23 June 1998 (aged 25)	1.67 m	0	0	(South Korea) Busan
34	RB	Lee Hye-won	16 May 2004 (aged 19)	1.68 m	9	39	(South Korea) Daegu Physical Education High School
97	P	Kim Se-jin	6 December 2005 (aged 17)	1.74 m	8	18	(South Korea) Hwangji Information Industry High School

== Group D ==
=== Angola ===
A 17-player squad was announced on 30 October 2023.

Head coach: Vivaldo Eduardo

No.	Pos.	Name	Date of birth (age)	Height	App.	Goals	Club
1	GK	Marta Alberto	10 February 1995 (aged 28)	1.82 m	7	1	(Angola) Petro de Luanda
5	P	Liliane Mario	16 November 2004 (aged 19)	1.77 m	20	57	(Angola) Primeiro de Agosto
6	RB	Juliana Machado	6 November 1994 (aged 29)	1.72 m	74	137	(Angola) Primeiro de Agosto
7	RW	Dolores Rosário	1 April 2003 (aged 20)	1.76 m	20	32	(Angola) Primeiro de Agosto
8	CB	Helena Paulo	24 January 1998 (aged 25)	1.73 m	48	184	(Angola) Primeiro de Agosto
9	LW	Natália Santos	25 December 1986 (aged 36)	1.73 m	289	230	(Angola) Primeiro de Agosto
10	P	Albertina Kassoma	12 June 1996 (aged 27)	1.85 m	88	243	(Romania) Rapid București
11	LW	Marília Quizelete	3 June 1997 (aged 26)	1.73 m	23	45	(Angola) Petro de Luanda
13	RW	Natália Kamalandua	25 December 1998 (aged 24)	1.64 m	30	85	(Romania) CSM Corona Brașov
16	GK	Teresa Almeida	5 April 1988 (aged 35)	1.72 m	99	0	(Angola) Petro de Luanda
18	CB	Chelcia Gabriel	24 September 2000 (aged 23)	1.70 m	0	0	(Angola) Petro de Luanda
20	LB	Stelvia de Jesus Pascoal	20 October 2002 (aged 21)	1.72 m	25	32	(France) Saint-Amand Handball
23	GK	Aminata Kanka	23 March 1999 (aged 24)	1.82 m	0	0	(Angola) Primeiro de Agosto
25	P	Liliana Venâncio	19 September 1995 (aged 28)	1.91 m	44	72	(Romania) HC Dunărea Brăila
35	RB	Azenaide Carlos	14 June 1990 (aged 33)	1.73 m	96	116	(Romania) CSM Corona Brașov
78	LB	Bernardeth Belo	2 January 2004 (aged 19)	1.82 m	23	61	(Angola) Primeiro de Agosto
90	CB	Isabel Guialo	8 April 1990 (aged 33)	1.70 m	91	292	(Angola) Primeiro de Agosto

=== France ===
A 20-player squad was announced on 6 November 2023. On 24 November, Déborah Lassource replaced Océane Sercien-Ugolin in the squad, who had to withdraw due to an injury. The final roster was revealed on 27 November 2023, as Djazz Chambertin and Orlane Ahanda were removed from the squad. On 3 December, Océane Sercien-Ugolin replaced Laura Flippes in the squad.

Head coach: Olivier Krumbholz

No.	Pos.	Name	Date of birth (age)	Height	App.	Goals	Club
1	GK	Laura Glauser	20 August 1993 (aged 30)	1.80 m	105	1	(Romania) CSM București
2	CB	Méline Nocandy	25 February 1998 (aged 25)	1.75 m	53	108	(France) Paris 92
3	RW	Alicia Toublanc	3 May 1996 (aged 27)	1.68 m	32	76	(France) Brest Bretagne Handball
6	LW	Chloé Valentini	19 April 1995 (aged 28)	1.65 m	71	163	(France) Metz Handball
8	LW	Coralie Lassource	1 September 1992 (aged 31)	1.70 m	72	121	(France) Brest Bretagne Handball
10	CB	Grâce Zaadi	7 July 1993 (aged 30)	1.71 m	167	341	(Romania) CSM București
19	RB	Océane Sercien-Ugolin	15 December 1997 (aged 25)	1.75 m	63	106	(Norway) Vipers Kristiansand
20	RB	Laura Flippes	13 December 1994 (aged 28)	1.71 m	114	217	(Romania) CSM București
21	LB	Orlane Kanor	16 June 1997 (aged 26)	1.79 m	73	137	(Romania) CS Rapid București
22	LB	Tamara Horacek	5 November 1995 (aged 28)	1.78 m	66	87	(France) Neptunes de Nantes
23	CB	Déborah Lassource	29 September 1999 (aged 24)	1.72 m	20	25	(France) Paris 92
26	P	Pauletta Foppa	22 December 2000 (aged 22)	1.77 m	72	183	(France) Brest Bretagne Handball
27	LB	Estelle Nze Minko (c)	11 August 1991 (aged 32)	1.78 m	169	397	(Hungary) Győri Audi ETO KC
29	P	Oriane Ondono	14 April 1996 (aged 27)	1.80 m	18	17	(France) Neptunes de Nantes
30	GK	Camille Depuiset	19 October 1998 (aged 25)	1.78 m	5	0	(France) Metz Handball
31	RW	Lucie Granier	11 May 1999 (aged 24)	1.67 m	25	46	(France) Metz Handball
32	P	Sarah Bouktit	27 August 2002 (aged 21)	1.80 m	5	2	(France) Metz Handball
34	CB	Léna Grandveau	21 January 2003 (aged 20)	1.70 m	6	5	(France) Neptunes de Nantes
99	GK	Hatadou Sako	21 October 1995 (aged 28)	1.74 m	4	0	(France) Metz Handball

=== Iceland ===
The squad was announced on 1 November 2023. Elín Klara Þorkelsdóttir withdrew due to an injury on 21 November 2023 and was replaced by Katla María Magnúsdóttir.

Head coach: Arnar Pétursson

No.	Pos.	Name	Date of birth (age)	Height	App.	Goals	Club
1	GK	Elín Þorsteinsdóttir	30 November 1996 (aged 26)	1.78 m	44	1	(Denmark) EH Aalborg
2	LB	Berglind Þorsteinsdóttir	2 January 1999 (aged 24)	1.80 m	11	5	(Iceland) Fram
3	LB	Andrea Jacobsen	9 April 1998 (aged 25)	1.81 m	41	46	(Denmark) Silkeborg-Voel KFUM
4	RW	Þórey Rósa Stefánsdóttir	14 August 1989 (aged 34)	1.67 m	123	348	(Iceland) Fram
6	RW	Þórey Anna Ásgeirsdóttir	3 November 1997 (aged 26)	1.71 m	38	21	(Iceland) Valur
8	LW	Perla Ruth Albertsdóttir	21 September 1996 (aged 27)	1.63 m	34	53	(Iceland) Selfoss
9	LW	Lilja Ágústsdóttir	30 April 2004 (aged 19)	1.70 m	10	4	(Iceland) Valur
12	GK	Hafdís Renötudóttir	12 July 1997 (aged 26)	1.93 m	45	2	(Iceland) Valur
14	P	Elísa Elíasdóttir	31 July 2004 (aged 19)	1.76 m	4	0	(Iceland) ÍBV
15	LB	Jóhanna Margrét Sigurðardóttir	12 June 2002 (aged 21)	1.79 m	6	8	(Sweden) Skara HF
18	P	Hildigunnur Einarsdóttir	11 February 1988 (aged 35)	1.76 m	96	108	(Iceland) Valur
21	CB	Sandra Erlingsdóttir	27 July 1998 (aged 25)	1.60 m	22	95	(Germany) TuS Metzingen
22	CB	Elín Rósa Magnúsdóttir	22 October 2002 (aged 21)	1.67 m	4	11	(Iceland) Valur
25	RB	Thea Imani Sturludóttir	21 January 1997 (aged 26)	1.79 m	64	124	(Iceland) Valur
26	LB	Sunna Jónsdóttir	26 February 1989 (aged 34)	1.77 m	77	59	(Iceland) ÍBV
27	RW	Díana Dögg Magnúsdóttir	19 September 1997 (aged 26)	1.75 m	40	48	(Germany) BSV Sachsen Zwickau
33	P	Katrín Tinna Jensdóttir	31 July 2002 (aged 21)	1.81 m	5	0	(Sweden) Skara HF
35	LB	Katla María Magnúsdóttir	16 September 2001 (aged 22)	1.78 m	0	8	(Iceland) Selfoss

=== Slovenia ===
A 22-player squad was announced on 8 November 2023. It was reduced to 20 players on 25 November 2023.

Head coach: (Montenegro) Dragan Adžić

No.	Pos.	Name	Date of birth (age)	Height	App.	Goals	Club
2	P	Valentina Klemenčič	5 February 2002 (aged 21)	1.85 m	32	43	(Slovenia) RK Krim
3	P	Manca Jurič	18 January 1995 (aged 28)	1.75 m	21	16	(Slovenia) RK Krim
4	LB	Erin Novak	7 June 2002 (aged 21)	1.76 m	15	11	(Hungary) Kisvárdai KC
6	RB	Ana Gros	21 January 1991 (aged 32)	1.86 m	141	704	(Hungary) Győri Audi ETO KC
8	RW	Ema Marković	17 August 2003 (aged 20)	1.71 m	7	8	(Slovenia) ŽRK Z'dežele
9	CB	Nina Spreitzer	4 March 1998 (aged 25)	1.78 m	55	30	(Slovenia) RK Krim
10	LB	Tjaša Stanko	5 November 1997 (aged 26)	1.73 m	93	398	(Slovenia) RK Krim
11	LB	Ana Abina	30 July 1997 (aged 26)	1.75 m	61	60	(Slovenia) RK Ajdovščina
14	LW	Tamara Mavsar	1 April 1991 (aged 32)	1.73 m	90	332	(Slovenia) RK Krim
16	GK	Maja Vojnović	26 January 1998 (aged 25)	1.80 m	61	0	(Slovenia) RK Krim
17	P	Nataša Ljepoja	28 January 1996 (aged 27)	1.78 m	61	103	(Romania) SCM Râmnicu Vâlcea
20	RW	Alja Varagić	11 December 1990 (aged 32)	1.85 m	87	184	(Slovenia) RK Krim
21	GK	Amra Pandžić	20 September 1989 (aged 34)	1.78 m	89	2	(Romania) CS Minaur Baia Mare
25	RB	Barbara Lazović	4 January 1988 (aged 35)	1.82 m	93	303	(Slovenia) RK Krim
28	LW	Maja Svetik	9 March 1996 (aged 27)	1.67 m	48	61	(Austria) BT Füchse
30	GK	Dijana Đajić	3 October 2004 (aged 19)	1.82 m	2	0	(Slovenia) RK Krim
35	LB	Ema Hrvatin	4 January 2000 (aged 23)	1.76 m	10	14	(Germany) BSV Sachsen Zwickau
88	LW	Ema Abina	18 February 1999 (aged 24)	1.71 m	21	29	(Slovenia) RK Krim

== Group E ==
=== Chile ===
The squad was announced on 30 November 2023.

Head coach: Felipe Barrientos

No.	Pos.	Name	Date of birth (age)	Height	App.	Goals	Club
4	RB	Constanza Paul	10 December 2005 (aged 17)	1.70 m	8	9	(Chile) Club Balonmano Los Ángeles
5	LW	Romina Ramírez	12 October 1998 (aged 25)	1.60 m	22	58	(Chile) Club Italiano Balonmano
6	RB	Valeska Lovera	22 September 1998 (aged 25)	1.73 m	34	176	(Spain) CD Beti Onak
7	RW	Gabriela Muller	22 April 2003 (aged 20)	1.73 m	18	85	(Chile) Ovalle Balonmano
8	CB	Josefa Araya	20 April 2001 (aged 22)	1.62 m	27	57	(Chile) Deumayen Balonmano
9	CB	Catalina Gálvez	18 October 2003 (aged 20)	1.72 m	5	24	(Chile) Ovalle Balonmano
10	LB	Francisca Parra	11 November 2000 (aged 23)	1.66 m	29	54	(Chile) Ovalle Balonmano
14	P	Catalina Moreno	27 September 1999 (aged 24)	1.76 m	42	39	(Chile) Club Deportivo Las Leonas
16	P	Alicia Torres	1 June 1993 (aged 30)	1.74 m	64	125
17	P	Pía Pacheco	25 May 2000 (aged 23)	1.68 m	22	26	(Chile) Deumayen Balonmano
18	CB	María Correa	20 October 1997 (aged 26)	1.71 m	43	46	(Chile) Ovalle Balonmano
19	GK	Antonella Piantini	14 April 1992 (aged 31)	1.78 m	58	0
22	LW	Maura Álvarez	13 November 1996 (aged 27)	1.75 m	49	96	(Chile) Club Deportivo Las Leonas
23	GK	Madeleine Cortez	6 April 2000 (aged 23)	1.64 m	22	0	(Chile) Club Handbol Mislata
27	RB	Francisca Zavala	9 November 1996 (aged 27)	1.73 m	35	51	(Chile) Club Deportivo Las Leonas
28	LB	Valeria Carrasco	7 April 2003 (aged 20)	1.60 m	14	21	(Chile) Club Italiano Balonmano
30	RW	Michaela Bocchieri	30 September 2005 (aged 18)	1.68 m	0	0	(Spain) Pozuelo de Calatrava

=== Denmark ===
The squad was announced on 2 November 2023. On 16 December, Kaja Kamp replaced Kathrine Heindahl in the squad due to a knee injury.

Head coach: Jesper Jensen

No.	Pos.	Name	Date of birth (age)	Height	App.	Goals	Club
1	GK	Sandra Toft	18 October 1989 (aged 34)	1.74 m	170	1	(Hungary) Győri Audi ETO KC
3	P	Kaja Kamp	29 April 1994 (aged 29)	1.72 m	0	0	(Denmark) Team Esbjerg
5	P	Sarah Iversen	10 April 1990 (aged 33)	1.77 m	75	111	(Denmark) Ikast Håndbold
6	CB	Helena Elver	1 March 1998 (aged 25)	1.75 m	8	9	(Denmark) Odense Håndbold
8	LB	Anne Mette Hansen	25 August 1994 (aged 29)	1.82 m	149	423	(France) Metz Handball
10	P	Kathrine Heindahl	26 March 1992 (aged 31)	1.82 m	127	263	(Denmark) Team Esbjerg
11	LB	Line Haugsted	11 November 1994 (aged 29)	1.80 m	86	123	(Hungary) Győri Audi ETO KC
12	GK	Anna Kristensen	25 October 2000 (aged 23)	1.83 m	25	0	(Denmark) Team Esbjerg
16	GK	Althea Reinhardt	1 September 1996 (aged 27)	1.80 m	99	0	(Denmark) Odense Håndbold
21	RW	Andrea Hansen	22 May 2000 (aged 23)	1.78 m	27	24	(Denmark) Odense Håndbold
23	LB	Kristina Jørgensen	17 January 1998 (aged 25)	1.87 m	97	256	(France) Metz Handball
25	RW	Trine Østergaard	17 October 1991 (aged 32)	1.66 m	169	334	(Romania) CSM București
27	RB	Louise Burgaard	17 October 1992 (aged 31)	1.76 m	162	334	(France) Metz Handball
31	CB	Simone Petersen	28 August 1997 (aged 26)	1.75 m	43	76	(Denmark) Ikast Håndbold
32	LB	Mie Højlund	24 October 1997 (aged 26)	1.80 m	84	154	(Denmark) Odense Håndbold
33	LW	Emma Friis	31 October 1999 (aged 24)	1.62 m	44	127	(Denmark) Ikast Håndbold
34	P	Rikke Iversen	18 May 1993 (aged 30)	1.78 m	64	100	(Denmark) Team Esbjerg
41	LW	Elma Halilcevic	18 June 2000 (aged 23)	1.68 m	24	40	(Denmark) Odense Håndbold
45	LB	Julie Scaglione	20 August 2004 (aged 19)	1.75 m	6	11	(Denmark) Ikast Håndbold

=== Romania ===
A 20-player squad was announced on 14 November 2023. It was reduced to 18 players on 26 November 2023. On 27 November, Diana Lixăndroiu was added to the squad.

Head coach: Florentin Pera

No.	Pos.	Name	Date of birth (age)	Height	App.	Goals	Club
2	LW	Nicoleta Dincă	2 July 1988 (aged 35)	1.73 m	49	63	(Romania) Gloria Bistrița
4	LB	Claudia Paşcan	18 June 1994 (aged 29)	1.76 m	2	3	(Romania) SCM Craiova
7	CB	Eliza Buceschi	1 August 1993 (aged 30)	1.77 m	103	244	(Romania) Rapid București
8	LB	Cristina Neagu	26 August 1988 (aged 35)	1.80 m	221	972	(Romania) CSM București
12	GK	Diana Ciucă	1 June 2000 (aged 23)	1.80 m	18	1	(Romania) Rapid București
13	CB	Cristina Laslo	10 April 1996 (aged 27)	1.76 m	79	137	(Romania) Gloria Bistrița
14	LB	Bianca Bazaliu	30 July 1997 (aged 26)	1.83 m	23	29	(Romania) Gloria Bistrița
18	RB	Daria Bucur	11 July 1999 (aged 24)	1.81 m	14	9	(Romania) SCM Gloria Buzău
20	GK	Iulia Dumanska	15 August 1996 (aged 27)	1.78 m	69	0	(Romania) Gloria Bistrița
21	LW	Alexandra Dindiligan	16 February 1997 (aged 26)	1.70 m	19	14	(Romania) CSM București
22	RW	Alexandra Badea	22 May 1998 (aged 25)	1.75 m	14	12	(Romania) Rapid București
27	P	Lorena Ostase	25 July 1997 (aged 26)	1.79 m	35	51	(Romania) Rapid București
28	LB	Diana Lixăndroiu	14 August 2005 (aged 18)	1.79 m	9	3	(Romania) CSM Slatina
30	RW	Sonia Seraficeanu	25 July 1997 (aged 26)	1.74 m	39	63	(Romania) Gloria Bistrița
33	P	Nicoleta Balog	17 November 1994 (aged 29)	1.76 m	2	0	(Romania) HC Dunărea Brăila
70	CB	Andreea Popa	3 June 2000 (aged 23)	1.77 m	9	9	(Romania) HC Dunărea Brăila
71	RB	Alicia Gogîrlă	17 January 2003 (aged 20)	1.82 m	2	0	(Romania) SCM Râmnicu Vâlcea
77	P	Crina Pintea	3 April 1990 (aged 33)	1.92 m	112	183	(Romania) CSM București
98	GK	Daciana Hosu	16 January 1998 (aged 25)	1.82 m	23	0	(Romania) SCM Râmnicu Vâlcea

=== Serbia ===
A 19-player squad was announced on 13 November 2023.

Head coach: (Slovenia) Uroš Bregar

No.	Pos.	Name	Date of birth (age)	Height	App.	Goals	Club
1	GK	Marija Simić	21 February 2000 (aged 23)	1.77 m	5	0	(Serbia) ŽORK Jagodina
2	LW	Sanja Radosavljević	15 January 1994 (aged 29)	1.72 m	90	244	(Sweden) Kristianstad Handboll
3	LB	Teodora Veličković	28 April 2001 (aged 22)	1.75 m	5	6	(Serbia) ŽRK Naisa
4	CB	Teodora Majkić	6 October 2000 (aged 23)	1.70 m	3	2	(Serbia) RK Crvena zvezda
7	CB	Aleksandra Vukajlović	7 June 1997 (aged 26)	1.74 m	41	54	(Romania) CS Minaur Baia Mare
11	RB	Marija Laništanin	9 August 1995 (aged 28)	1.78 m	19	31	(Hungary) Békéscsabai Előre NKSE
14	P	Edita Nuković	1 August 1997 (aged 26)	1.80 m	8	15	(Germany) SV Union Halle-Neustadt
15	RB	Anđela Janjušević	18 June 1995 (aged 28)	1.81 m	66	158	(Romania) CS Rapid București
22	LB	Jovana Jovović	4 December 2001 (aged 21)	1.81 m	23	49	(Hungary) Debreceni VSC
25	LW	Aleksandra Stamenić	12 July 1998 (aged 25)	1.67 m	14	12	(Serbia) RK Crvena zvezda
27	GK	Molli Kubina	14 May 2002 (aged 21)	1.78 m	0	0	(Hungary) Alba Fehérvár KC
29	RW	Nataša Lovrić	2 October 2000 (aged 23)	1.74 m	13	17	(Serbia) ŽRK Zelezničar
31	P	Katarina Bojičić	13 March 1998 (aged 25)	1.79 m	12	18	(Romania) SCM Craiova
34	RW	Dunja Radević	25 November 2005 (aged 18)	1.69 m	5	8	(Montenegro) ŽRK Budućnost Podgorica
36	LB	Emilija Lazić	4 August 2000 (aged 23)	1.78 m	0	0	(Romania) HC Zalău
92	P	Jovana Milojević	24 July 1992 (aged 31)	1.76 m	39	32	(Poland) MKS Zagłębie Lubin
99	GK	Marija Čolić	12 April 1990 (aged 33)	1.73 m	29	1	(France) OGC Nice

== Group F ==
=== Germany ===
The squad was announced on 9 November 2023. Mia Zschocke withdrew due to an injury and was replaced by Toni-Luisa Reinemann on 16 November 2023. Mareike Thomaier was added on 26 November 2023.

Head coach: Markus Gaugisch

No.	Pos.	Name	Date of birth (age)	Height	App.	Goals	Club
3	RW	Amelie Berger	22 July 1999 (aged 24)	1.70 m	52	105	(Germany) HSG Bensheim-Auerbach
4	CB	Alina Grijseels	12 April 1996 (aged 27)	1.75 m	71	342	(France) Metz Handball
7	P	Meike Schmelzer	19 July 1993 (aged 30)	1.79 m	91	128	(Romania) HC Dunărea Brăila
9	P	Lisa Antl	21 June 2000 (aged 23)	1.72 m	32	34	(Germany) Borussia Dortmund
10	CB	Mareike Thomaier	25 August 2000 (aged 23)	1.72 m	12	3	(Germany) Bayer Leverkusen
11	LB	Xenia Smits	22 April 1994 (aged 29)	1.85 m	102	237	(Germany) SG BBM Bietigheim
20	LB	Emily Bölk	26 April 1998 (aged 25)	1.82 m	95	317	(Hungary) Ferencvárosi TC
22	RB	Maren Weigel	22 May 1994 (aged 29)	1.77 m	53	54	(Germany) TuS Metzingen
23	LB	Annika Lott	7 December 1999 (aged 23)	1.80 m	15	14	(Germany) Thüringer HC
24	GK	Sarah Wachter	16 December 1999 (aged 23)	1.83 m	10	0	(Germany) Borussia Dortmund
28	LW	Toni-Luisa Reinemann	31 May 2001 (aged 22)	1.78 m	4	1	(Germany) VfL Oldenburg
29	LW	Antje Döll	3 October 1988 (aged 35)	1.70 m	63	146	(Germany) SG BBM Bietigheim
30	RW	Jenny Behrend	20 January 1996 (aged 27)	1.72 m	39	52	(Germany) SG BBM Bietigheim
42	GK	Katharina Filter	4 February 1999 (aged 24)	1.80 m	34	2	(France) Brest Bretagne Handball
77	RB	Viola Leuchter	15 June 2004 (aged 19)	1.87 m	7	17	(Germany) Bayer Leverkusen
93	P	Julia Behnke	28 March 1993 (aged 30)	1.80 m	89	170	(Germany) TuS Metzingen
95	LW	Johanna Stockschläder	11 February 1995 (aged 28)	1.71 m	36	106	(Germany) Thüringer HC

=== Iran ===
The squad was announced on 2 November 2023.

Head coach: Gholam Ali Akbarabadi

No.	Pos.	Name	Date of birth (age)	Height	App.	Goals	Club
2	CB	Asra Zandi	19 September 1993 (aged 30)	1.67 m	0	0	(Iran) Kimia Kordestan
4	LB	Fatemeh Merikh	6 August 2004 (aged 19)	1.70 m	7	38	(Iran) Sang Ahan Bafaq
9	RB	Setareh Rahmanian	19 November 1994 (aged 29)	1.78 m	0	0	(Iran) Zagros Club
10	P	Atieh Shahsavari	16 January 2000 (aged 23)	1.80 m	126	57	(Iran) Sang Ahan Bafaq
11	CB	Mehraban Badvi	16 May 2003 (aged 20)	1.77 m	0	0	(Iran) Moghavemat Alborz
12	GK	Fatemeh Khalili	30 June 1996 (aged 27)	1.75 m	40	0	(Romania) CSM Iași 2020
17	CB	Mina Vatanparast	10 December 1989 (aged 33)	1.67 m	36	113	(Iran) Sang Ahan Bafaq
20	LW	Bahar Izadgashb	2 July 2000 (aged 23)	1.64 m	18	27	(Iran) Foolad Hormozgan Club
22	GK	Hanieh Lak	2 January 1990 (aged 33)	1.72 m	36	0	(Iran) Sang Ahan Bafaq
24	LW	Hadiseh Norouzi	10 November 1998 (aged 25)	1.72 m	56	31	(Iran) Foolad Sepahan Isfahan
27	LB	Arezoo Kianiara	25 January 1994 (aged 29)	1.73 m	68	46	(Iran) Sang Ahan Bafgh
33	GK	Arezoo Mohammadi	18 August 1998 (aged 25)	1.78 m	24	0	(Iran) Foolad Hormozgan Club
37	P	Zahra Faghihi	25 January 1993 (aged 30)	1.71 m	0	0	(Iran) Foolad Hormozgan Club
76	LB	Nastaran Goudarzi Farahani	10 January 2004 (aged 19)	1.66 m	0	0	(Iran) Zagros Club
88	LW	Maedeh Oshaghi	17 June 2004 (aged 19)	1.77 m	7	13	(Iran) Sang Ahan Bafaq
96	RW	Sanaz Rajabi	15 October 1991 (aged 32)	1.65 m	100	150	(Iran) Foolad Hormozgan Club

=== Japan ===
A 20-player squad was announced on 7 November 2023.

Head coach: Shigeo Kusumoto

No.	Pos.	Name	Date of birth (age)	Height	App.	Goals	Club
1	GK	Sakura Hauge	7 January 1987 (aged 36)	1.74 m	69	8	(France) ESBF Besançon
2	P	Mika Nagata	28 May 1994 (aged 29)	1.80 m	59	41	(Japan) Hokkoku Bank
3	P	Naoko Sahara	18 January 1996 (aged 27)	1.80 m	14	18	(Japan) Hokkoku Bank
4	P	Miyako Hatsumi	10 September 1997 (aged 26)	1.65 m	12	17	(Japan) Mie Violet Iris
6	LB	Yumi Kitahara	8 July 1995 (aged 28)	1.71 m	21	22	(Japan) Sony Semiconductor
7	RW	Saki Hattori	22 December 1996 (aged 26)	1.60 m	18	80	(Japan) Sony Semiconductor
9	P	Chikako Kasai	25 November 1998 (aged 25)	1.68 m	11	23	(Japan) Sony Semiconductor
12	GK	Atsuko Baba	13 June 1995 (aged 28)	1.64 m	16	0	(Japan) Hokkoku Bank
13	RB	Kaho Nakayama	23 October 1998 (aged 25)	1.72 m	20	71	(Japan) Hokkoku Bank
15	LW	Senri Ryu	12 July 1999 (aged 24)	1.69 m	0	0	(Japan) Sony Semiconductor
18	LW	Hikaru Matsumoto	25 February 1995 (aged 28)	1.67 m	12	32	(Japan) Hokkoku Bank
20	RW	Natsumi Akiyama	23 July 1994 (aged 29)	1.62 m	37	94	(Hungary) Kisvárdai KC
22	GK	Naho Saito	16 January 1997 (aged 26)	1.72 m	10	0	(Japan) Hokkoku Bank
23	CB	Natsuki Aizawa	6 January 1999 (aged 24)	1.60 m	17	78	(Japan) Hokkoku Bank
24	CB	Ayame Okada	24 May 2000 (aged 23)	1.67 m	11	24	(Japan) Kagawa Bank
32	LB	Haruno Sasaki	26 February 1995 (aged 28)	1.72 m	47	142	(Germany) Borussia Dortmund
49	LB	Hinata Fujiwara	27 May 2002 (aged 21)	1.74 m	0	0	(Japan) University of Tsukuba
50	RB	Wakana Hokaguchi	23 January 2004 (aged 19)	1.70 m	0	0	(Japan) University of Tsukuba
51	LW	Yuki Yoshidome	2 August 1998 (aged 25)	1.64 m	14	18	(Japan) Hokkoku Bank
89	RB	Sora Ishikawa	20 December 2002 (aged 20)	1.69 m	12	32	(Japan) Osaka University of Health and Sport Sciences

=== Poland ===
An 18-player squad was announced on 7 November 2023.

Head coach: (Norway) Arne Senstad

No.	Pos.	Name	Date of birth (age)	Height	App.	Goals	Club
2	LB	Aleksandra Zimny	21 March 1996 (aged 27)	1.90 m	25	26	(Romania) SCM Gloria Buzău
6	CB	Emilia Galińska	26 December 1992 (aged 30)	1.75 m	31	27	(Romania) CS Măgura Cisnădie
8	RB	Monika Kobylińska	9 April 1995 (aged 28)	1.77 m	97	329	(Romania) CSM București
9	RW	Magda Balsam	20 September 1996 (aged 27)	1.72 m	35	87	(Poland) MKS Lublin
11	LW	Mariola Wiertelak	8 October 1991 (aged 32)	1.63 m	15	33	(Poland) KPR Kobierzyce
13	P	Sylwia Matuszczyk	11 June 1992 (aged 31)	1.72 m	45	79	(Poland) Eurobud JKS Jarosław
16	GK	Adrianna Płaczek	10 December 1993 (aged 29)	1.74 m	85	0	(France) Paris 92
17	RW	Adrianna Górna	22 March 1996 (aged 27)	1.71 m	48	49	(Poland) MKS Zagłębie Lubin
18	CB	Aleksandra Tomczyk	19 October 1994 (aged 29)	1.71 m	9	8	(Poland) MKS Lublin
21	GK	Barbara Zima	14 January 2000 (aged 23)	1.89 m	28	3	(Poland) MKS Zagłębie Lubin
22	LB	Aleksandra Rosiak	7 July 1997 (aged 26)	1.82 m	57	122	(Slovenia) RK Krim
31	P	Nikola Głębocka	14 February 2002 (aged 21)	1.80 m	2	2	(Poland) EKS Start Elbląg
34	P	Marlena Urbańska	11 January 1998 (aged 25)	1.86 m	6	2	(Germany) Frisch Auf Göppingen
40	LW	Daria Michalak	12 December 1995 (aged 27)	1.71 m	39	59	(Poland) MKS Zagłębie Lubin
49	CB	Karolina Kochaniak	5 July 1995 (aged 28)	1.75 m	31	61	(Poland) MKS Zagłębie Lubin
78	LB	Paulina Uścinowicz	16 October 1999 (aged 24)	1.83 m	5	1	(Germany) HSV Solingen-Gräfrath
79	RB	Paulina Masna	19 March 1992 (aged 31)	1.75 m	5	6	(Poland) MKS Lublin
96	LW	Dagmara Nocuń	2 January 1996 (aged 27)	1.60 m	44	76	(Germany) TuS Metzingen

== Group G ==
=== Brazil ===
The squad was announced on 13 November 2023.

Head coach: Cristiano Silva

No.	Pos.	Name	Date of birth (age)	Height	App.	Goals	Club
1	GK	Gabriela Moreschi	8 July 1994 (aged 29)	1.90 m	64	0	(Germany) SG BBM Bietigheim
2	LB	Bruna de Paula	26 September 1996 (aged 27)	1.70 m	87	271	(Hungary) Győri Audi ETO KC
6	LB	Mariane Fernándes	4 January 1996 (aged 27)	1.65 m	33	75	(Spain) BM Bera Bera
7	P	Tamires Morena Lima	16 May 1994 (aged 29)	1.83 m	141	231	(Romania) Gloria Bistrița-Năsăud
9	CB	Ana Paula Belo	18 October 1987 (aged 36)	1.72 m	230	806	(Italy) Handball Erice
11	LW	Fernanda Paulino	8 November 2000 (aged 23)	1.73 m	9	25	(Spain) CBF Elda
12	GK	Bárbara Arenhart	4 October 1986 (aged 37)	1.81 m	200	18	(Slovenia) RK Krim
13	P	Lígia Costa	14 March 1996 (aged 27)	1.94 m	21	17	(Slovakia) HC DAC Dunajská Streda
20	LW	Larissa Araújo	1 July 1992 (aged 31)	1.67 m	90	189	(Romania) HC Dunărea Brăila
21	RW	Adriana Cardoso de Castro	29 October 1990 (aged 33)	1.67 m	71	294	(Montenegro) ŽRK Budućnost Podgorica
23	RB	Giulia Guarieiro	24 July 1995 (aged 28)	1.74 m	38	48	(Spain) BM Granollers
29	CB	Francielle da Rocha	10 June 1992 (aged 31)	1.66 m	98	122	(Romania) HC Dunărea Brăila
30	RB	Gabriela Bitolo	1 April 1999 (aged 24)	1.80 m	19	17	(Spain) CBF Málaga Costa del Sol
36	P	Marcela Arounian	7 January 2000 (aged 23)	1.89 m	16	23	(Spain) BM Aula Cultural
42	CB	Jhennifer Lopes	28 July 2000 (aged 23)	1.76 m	9	8	(Spain) BM Remudas
49	CB	Patrícia Matieli	8 November 1988 (aged 35)	1.68 m	83	114	(Poland) MKS Zagłębie Lubin
77	LB	Kelly de Abreu Rosa	25 January 2004 (aged 19)	1.80 m	0	0	(Spain) CB Elche
88	RW	Mariana Costa	14 October 1992 (aged 31)	1.66 m	76	193	(Hungary) Debreceni VSC

=== Kazakhstan ===
Head coach: Yevgeniy Shishkin

No.	Pos.	Name	Date of birth (age)	Height	App.	Goals	Club
3	P	Mariya Sitnikova	11 October 1998 (aged 25)	1.65 m	31	46	(Kazakhstan) HC Shymkent
4	LW	Sevara Rejemetova	1 January 1994 (aged 29)	1.59 m	63	94	(Kazakhstan) Handball Club Turan
8	LW	Valentina Sitnikova	10 November 1998 (aged 25)	1.65 m	36	38	(Kazakhstan) HC Shymkent
9	LB	Veronika Khardina	29 August 1996 (aged 27)	1.76 m	86	194	(Kazakhstan) Kaysar Club
10	RB	Kristina Radayeva	4 January 1995 (aged 28)	1.79 m	73	155	(Kazakhstan) Handball Club Altai
11	P	Zlata Zvyagina	26 November 2002 (aged 21)	1.72 m	46	59	(Kazakhstan) Kaysar Club
12	GK	Zhannat Aitenova	5 November 1989 (aged 34)	1.82 m	114	4	(Kazakhstan) Kaysar Club
17	RW	Zhanerke Seitkassym	5 December 2002 (aged 20)	1.62 m	46	84	(Kazakhstan) Kaysar Club
18	LW	Xeniya Pupchenkova	18 March 2002 (aged 21)	1.68 m	51	45	(Kazakhstan) Kaysar Club
23	P	Aruzhan Khamitova	19 August 2000 (aged 23)	1.78 m	6	10	(Kazakhstan) HC Alatay
24	LB	Zhanerke Kuandykova	25 February 2004 (aged 19)	1.80 m	27	37	(Kazakhstan) Handball Club Astana
44	GK	Damira Zhaparova	27 November 2005 (aged 18)	1.70 m	21	0	(Kazakhstan) Handball Club Astana
61	GK	Darya Kolesnichenko	8 August 2004 (aged 19)	1.82 m	16	0	(Kazakhstan) HC Alatay
72	LW	Luiza Khassanova	20 October 2001 (aged 22)	1.62 m	16	28	(Kazakhstan) Handball Club Turan
77	CB	Tansholpan Jumadilova	18 July 1998 (aged 25)	1.62 m	76	78	(Kazakhstan) HC Shymkent
99	RB	Mariya Pupchenkova	10 March 1998 (aged 25)	1.78 m	76	120	(Kazakhstan) Kaysar Club

=== Spain ===
A 19-player squad was announced on 7 November 2023. Soledad López was added to the squad on 20 November 2023. On 21 November, Seynabou Mbengue and Jennifer Gutiérrez withdrawn from the squad due to injuries. On 24 November, Alexandrina Cabral was also removed from the squad.

Head coach: Ambros Martín

No.	Pos.	Name	Date of birth (age)	Height	App.	Goals	Club
6	LB	Carmen Campos	10 July 1995 (aged 28)	1.71 m	53	142	(Germany) Borussia Dortmund
8	CB	Silvia Arderíus	11 July 1990 (aged 33)	1.69 m	78	81	(Spain) CBF Málaga Costa del Sol
16	GK	Mercedes Castellanos	21 July 1988 (aged 35)	1.84 m	82	4	(Spain) CBF Málaga Costa del Sol
18	RW	Maitane Etxeberria	15 January 1997 (aged 26)	1.69 m	74	127	(Spain) BM Bera Bera
19	LB	Ester Somaza	3 June 2004 (aged 19)	1.78 m	4	9	(Spain) KH-7 BM Granollers
20	LW	Amaia González de Garibay	27 February 1994 (aged 29)	1.68 m	47	79	(Spain) BM Aula Cultural
22	LB	Lara González Ortega	22 February 1992 (aged 31)	1.85 m	160	177	(Romania) CS Rapid București
27	LB	Danila So Delgado	19 September 2001 (aged 22)	1.73 m	2	6	(Spain) CB Elche
30	LW	Soledad López	4 April 1992 (aged 31)	1.62 m	78	169	(Spain) CBF Málaga Costa del Sol
33	P	Kaba Gassama	16 August 1997 (aged 26)	1.84 m	51	70	(Germany) SG BBM Bietigheim
34	CB	Alicia Fernández	21 December 1992 (aged 30)	1.73 m	85	186	(Romania) CS Rapid București
48	GK	Darly Zoqbi de Paula	25 August 1982 (aged 41)	1.78 m	71	0	(Romania) SCM Craiova
52	RW	Paulina Pérez	25 January 1997 (aged 26)	1.68 m	4	0	(Spain) BM Porriño
58	RB	María Prieto O'Mullony	3 October 1997 (aged 26)	1.72 m	10	30	(Spain) BM Aula Cultural
61	P	Lysa Tchaptchet	20 December 2001 (aged 21)	1.86 m	34	36	(Norway) Vipers Kristiansand
62	RB	Paula Arcos	21 December 2001 (aged 21)	1.68 m	44	99	(Norway) Vipers Kristiansand
99	RB	Mireya González	18 July 1991 (aged 32)	1.77 m	106	205	(Romania) HC Dunărea Brăila

=== Ukraine ===
The squad was announced on 20 November 2023.

Head coach: Vitaliy Andronov

No.	Pos.	Name	Date of birth (age)	Height	App.	Goals	Club
1	GK	Yudit Baloh	7 August 1995 (aged 28)	1.78 m	25	0	(Hungary) Vasas SC
7	CB	Mariana Markevych	5 January 1998 (aged 25)	1.67 m	15	0	(Ukraine) HC Galychanka
8	LB	Karina Soskyda	9 October 2005 (aged 18)	1.79 m	0	0	(Slovakia) IUVENTA Michalovce
9	LB	Yuliya Andriychuk	17 May 1992 (aged 31)	1.83 m	7	0	(Romania) CS Dacia Mioveni 2012
10	P	Iryna Prokopiak	11 June 2003 (aged 20)	1.77 m	2	0	(Ukraine) HC Galychanka
12	GK	Mariia Gladun	22 September 1996 (aged 27)	1.84 m	8	0	(Croatia) RK Lokomotiva Zagreb
14	LB	Tetiana Poliak	27 July 1999 (aged 24)	1.76 m	12	0	(Ukraine) HC Galychanka
15	P	Anastasiya Melekestseva	23 May 1998 (aged 25)	1.73 m	14	0	(Poland) KPR Kobierzyce
16	GK	Viktoriia Saltaniuk	8 October 2000 (aged 23)	1.78 m	11	0	(Poland) KPR Kobierzyce
17	P	Andriyana Naumenko	12 December 1998 (aged 24)	1.75 m	0	0	(Romania) HC Zalău
18	RB	Yevheniia Kohuch	5 August 2003 (aged 20)	1.90 m	2	0	(Slovakia) IUVENTA Michalovce
19	CB	Tamara Smbatian	19 March 1995 (aged 28)	1.77 m	19	0	(Hungary) Alba Fehérvár KC
21	LW	Olesia Diachenko	2 March 2003 (aged 20)	1.69 m	0	0	(Ukraine) HC Galychanka
22	RW	Kateryna Kozak	6 December 2002 (aged 20)	1.82 m	0	0	(Ukraine) HC Galychanka
28	LW	Maryna Konovalova	19 November 1996 (aged 27)	1.72 m	13	0	(Ukraine) HC Galychanka
32	RW	Milana Shukal	16 August 2001 (aged 22)	1.71 m	0	0	(Ukraine) HC Galychanka
33	LB	Iryna Kompaniiets	21 November 1993 (aged 30)	1.76 m	30	0	(Slovakia) IUVENTA Michalovce
34	P	Karyna Kolodiuk	19 April 2001 (aged 22)	1.80 m	0	0	(Ukraine) HC Karpaty Uzhhorod

== Group H ==
=== Argentina ===
An 18-player squad was announced on 7 November 2023.

Head coach: Eduardo Gallardo

No.	Pos.	Name	Date of birth (age)	Height	App.	Goals	Club
1	GK	Marisol Carratú	15 July 1986 (aged 37)	1.76 m	115	4	(Spain) CB Elche
2	RB	Sofia Rivadeneira	12 March 2003 (aged 20)	1.73 m	35	0	(Spain) CBF Elda
3	CB	Martina Romero	18 March 2002 (aged 21)	1.72 m	30	0	(Spain) BM Aula Cultural
5	LB	Manuela Pizzo	13 November 1991 (aged 32)	1.80 m	151	366	(Argentina) Mariano Acosta Handball
6	RW	Ayelén García	13 December 1999 (aged 23)	1.68 m	22	28	(Spain) CD Beti Onak
7	P	Rocío Campigli	6 August 1994 (aged 29)	1.71 m	71	150	(Spain) CBF Málaga
9	RB	Luciana Mendoza	14 March 1990 (aged 33)	1.70 m	184	598	(France) Pessac Handball
12	GK	Ayelén Rosalez	21 May 1995 (aged 28)	1.81 m	11	0	(Spain) BM Porriño
13	P	Giuliana Gavilan	7 March 1996 (aged 27)	1.76 m	43	54	(Spain) BM Bera Bera
16	GK	Leila Niño	23 October 1992 (aged 31)	1.68 m	31	2	(Argentina) River Plate
17	RB	Malena Cavo	2 April 1999 (aged 24)	1.69 m	27	79	(Spain) BM Bera Bera
18	P	Valentina Brodsky	9 October 1999 (aged 24)	1.76 m	4	0	(Argentina) River Plate
19	LW	Valentina Learreta	26 June 2000 (aged 23)	1.69 m	4	0	(Spain) CB Pozuelo de Calatrava
21	LB	Macarena Gandulfo	3 November 1993 (aged 30)	1.75 m	102	91	(Romania) CSM Corona Brașov
22	LB	Elke Karsten	15 May 1995 (aged 28)	1.77 m	105	330	(Spain) BM Bera Bera
24	CB	Carolina Bono	14 July 2000 (aged 23)	1.67 m	0	0	(Spain) BM Porriño
25	CB	Micaela Casasola	17 March 1997 (aged 26)	1.75 m	70	116	(Spain) BM Porriño
26	LW	Lucia Dalle	4 December 1998 (aged 24)	1.62 m	38	9	(Argentina) Estudiantes de La Plata

=== Congo ===
Head coach: (Morocco) Younes Tatby

No.	Pos.	Name	Date of birth (age)	Height	App.	Goals	Club
1	GK	Ruth Kodia	13 January 1992 (aged 31)	1.73 m	18	0	(Republic of the Congo) Étoile du Congo
2	RB	Jonedie Olikaka	31 July 2004 (aged 19)	1.71 m	7	5	(Morocco) Union Sportive Nouacer
5	LW	Kimberley Rutil	5 August 1996 (aged 27)	1.80 m	17	18	(France) Stella Saint-Maur Handball
6	LW	Klenn Divoko	21 June 1993 (aged 30)	1.79 m	27	17	(France) US Cagnes Handball
7	LB	Diane Yimga	27 April 1992 (aged 31)	1.83 m	21	25	(France) Carros HBC
8	CB	Ruptia Mouele	29 June 1991 (aged 32)	1.61 m	17	6	(Republic of the Congo) DGSP
10	RB	Mercianne Hendo	19 January 1997 (aged 26)	1.63 m	4	3	(Republic of the Congo) DGSP
11	RW	Hermida Mongo	7 October 1994 (aged 29)	1.67 m	16	6	(Republic of the Congo) DGSP
12	GK	Malvina Apendi	7 January 1998 (aged 25)	1.72 m	12	0	(France) Tournefeuille Handball
13	RW	Grace Zoubabela	17 March 1993 (aged 30)	1.73 m	19	11	(Republic of the Congo) DGSP
15	CB	Eugenia Domingos	16 November 1990 (aged 33)	1.75 m	0	0	(Republic of the Congo) Otoho Handball
20	GK	Alicia Ntessi	20 January 2000 (aged 23)	1.80 m	5	0	(France) Reims Champagne Handball
23	LB	Betchaïdelle Ngombele	23 April 2004 (aged 19)	1.90 m	28	36	(Slovenia) RK Krim
45	LW	Joséphine Nkou	18 September 1997 (aged 26)	1.65 m	14	17	(Italy) ASD Handball Erice
61	P	Rita Saraiva	21 November 1992 (aged 31)	1.77 m	22	18	(France) US Cagnes Handball
66	LW	Suzanne Mambou	25 April 1992 (aged 31)	1.73 m	29	18	(Republic of the Congo) DGSP
78	CB	Fanta Diagouraga	30 June 2000 (aged 23)	1.75 m	17	19	(Romania) CSM Deva
79	P	Sharon Dorson	9 March 1994 (aged 29)	1.78 m	22	26	(France) Noisy-le-Grand Handball
99	RB	Kassandra Jappont	21 October 1994 (aged 29)	1.78 m	21	19	(France) HBC Thuir

=== Czech Republic ===
A 21-player squad was announced on 16 November 2023. The final roster was revealed on 25 November 2023.

Head coach: (Norway) Bent Dahl

No.	Pos.	Name	Date of birth (age)	Height	App.	Goals	Club
9	LW	Adéla Stříšková	14 December 2000 (aged 22)	1.59 m	26	43	(Czech Republic) DHK Baník Most
14	LB	Kamila Kordovská	4 December 1997 (aged 25)	1.79 m	84	175	(France) Handball Plan-de-Cuques
22	RB	Markéta Šustáčková	9 April 1997 (aged 26)	1.74 m	39	49	(Norway) Molde Elite
24	LB	Eliška Desortová	19 April 2000 (aged 23)	1.75 m	1	0	(Slovakia) HC DAC Dunajská Streda
31	P	Alena Stellnerová	22 August 1989 (aged 34)	1.70 m	67	66	(Czech Republic) Sokol Písek
32	CB	Natálie Kuxová	30 September 2003 (aged 20)	1.82 m	10	8	(Czech Republic) DHK Baník Most
33	GK	Petra Kudláčková	17 October 1994 (aged 29)	1.73 m	67	1	(Czech Republic) DHC Slavia Prague
34	CB	Julie Franková	4 October 2000 (aged 23)	1.79 m	18	4	(Czech Republic) DHC Slavia Prague
38	RW	Anna Franková	2 October 1996 (aged 27)	1.70 m	17	28	(Germany) TuS Metzingen
42	P	Katka Dresslerová	21 May 1998 (aged 25)	1.70 m	0	0	(Czech Republic) Házená Kynžvart
44	RW	Dominika Zachová	4 June 1996 (aged 27)	1.75 m	59	193	(Czech Republic) DHK Baník Most
48	RB	Sára Kovářová	9 February 1999 (aged 24)	1.74 m	19	40	(Poland) MKS Lublin
51	LB	Markéta Jeřábková	8 February 1996 (aged 27)	1.74 m	139	601	(Denmark) Ikast Håndbold
67	LW	Veronika Malá	6 May 1994 (aged 29)	1.70 m	92	274	(Germany) SG BBM Bietigheim
79	GK	Sabrina Novotná	2 July 2000 (aged 23)	1.83 m	10	0	(Czech Republic) Házená Kynžvart
91	P	Anna Jestříbková	29 February 2004 (aged 19)	1.78 m	0	0	(Czech Republic) DHK Baník Most
96	LB	Charlotte Cholevová	29 July 2002 (aged 21)	1.73 m	21	62	(France) Brest Bretagne Handball

=== Netherlands ===
A 17-player squad was announced on 6 November 2023. On 21 November, Merel Freriks had to withdraw from the squad due to an ACL-injury and was replaced by Yvette Broch. On 24 November Loïs van Vliet was added to the squad.

Head coach: (Sweden) Per Johansson

No.	Pos.	Name	Date of birth (age)	Height	App.	Goals	Club
6	RB	Laura van der Heijden	27 June 1990 (aged 33)	1.72 m	263	810	(France) Chambray Touraine Handball
8	LB	Lois Abbingh	13 August 1992 (aged 31)	1.77 m	189	816	(Norway) Vipers Kristiansand
9	CB	Larissa Nüsser	8 February 2000 (aged 23)	1.75 m	52	78	(Denmark) Odense Håndbold
12	LW	Bo van Wetering	5 October 1999 (aged 24)	1.72 m	70	219	(Denmark) Odense Håndbold
13	P	Yvette Broch	23 December 1990 (aged 32)	1.85 m	120	305	(Hungary) Győri Audi ETO KC
16	P	Tamara Haggerty	29 April 1996 (aged 27)	1.78 m	11	7	(Hungary) Debreceni VSC
18	LB	Kelly Dulfer	21 March 1994 (aged 29)	1.85 m	168	280	(Germany) SG BBM Bietigheim
20	CB	Inger Smits	17 September 1994 (aged 29)	1.79 m	82	156	(Germany) SG BBM Bietigheim
22	LW	Zoë Sprengers	19 January 2000 (aged 23)	1.66 m	37	64	(Germany) Borussia Dortmund
23	LW	Loïs van Vliet	15 August 2005 (aged 18)	1.76 m	2	2	(Netherlands) OTTO Work Force VOC
26	RW	Angela Malestein	31 January 1993 (aged 30)	1.70 m	190	524	(Hungary) Ferencvárosi TC
30	GK	Rinka Duijndam	6 August 1997 (aged 26)	1.78 m	70	1	(Hungary) Győri Audi ETO KC
31	RW	Kelly Vollebregt	1 January 1995 (aged 28)	1.67 m	31	56	(France) Neptunes de Nantes
33	GK	Tess Lieder	19 May 1993 (aged 30)	1.78 m	144	12	(Germany) Borussia Dortmund
38	GK	Yara ten Holte	23 November 1999 (aged 24)	1.75 m	34	1	(Denmark) Odense Håndbold
44	P	Nikita van der Vliet	14 March 2000 (aged 23)	1.71 m	30	37	(Denmark) Odense Håndbold
48	RB	Dione Housheer	26 September 1999 (aged 24)	1.80 m	71	187	(Denmark) Odense Håndbold
79	CB	Estavana Polman	5 August 1992 (aged 31)	1.73 m	171	592	(Romania) CS Rapid București

== Statistics ==
=== Coaches representation by country ===
Coaches in bold represent their own country.

Rank	Country	Coaches
3	France	**Olivier Krumbholz**, Jamal El Kabouss (Cameroon), Yacine Messaoudi (Senegal)
3	Sweden	**Tomas Axnér**, Per Johansson (Netherlands), Henrik Signell (South Korea)
2	Denmark	**Jesper Jensen**, Anders Friis (Greenland)
2	Germany	**Markus Gaugisch**, Herbert Müller (Austria)
2	Iceland	**Arnar Pétursson**, Thorir Hergeirsson (Norway)
2	Montenegro	**Bojana Popović**, Dragan Adžić (Slovenia)
2	Norway	Arne Senstad (Poland), Bent Dahl (Czech Republic)
2	Ukraine	**Vitaliy Andronov**, Nataliya Derepasko (China)
1	Angola	**Vivaldo Eduardo**
1	Argentina	**Eduardo Gallardo**
1	Brazil	**Cristiano Silva**
1	Chile	**Felipe Barrientos**
1	Croatia	**Ivica Obrvan**
1	Hungary	**Vladimir Golovin**
1	Iran	**Gholam Ali Akbarabadi**
1	Japan	**Shigeo Kusumoto**
1	Kazakhstan	**Yevgeniy Shishkin**
1	Morocco	Younes Tatby (Congo)
1	Paraguay	**Marizza Faría**
1	Romania	**Florentin Pera**
1	Slovenia	Uroš Bregar (Serbia)
1	Spain	**Ambros Martín**
