= Klenn Divoko =

Congolese handball player

Personal information
- Nationality: Congolese
- Born: 21 June 1993 (age 33) Congo
- Height: 1.79 m (5 ft 10 in)

Sport
- Sport: Handball
- Position: Left wing
- Current club: CARA Brazzaville
National team
| Years | Team | Apps | (Gls) |
| – | Congo | 9 | (11) |
Medal record
African Championship
| Bronze medal – third place | 2022 Dakar |

Klenn Divoko (born 21 June 1993) is a Congolese handball player for CARA Brazzaville and the Congolese national team.

She participated at the 2021 World Women's Handball Championship in Spain.
