= Joséphine Nkou =

Congolese handball player

Personal information
- Nationality: Congolese/French
- Born: 23 August 1995 (age 31) Villeneuve-Saint-Georges, France
- Height: 1.65 m (5 ft 5 in)

Sport
- Sport: Handball
- Position: Left wing
- Current club: Paris 92
- Number: 45
National team
| Years | Team | Apps | (Gls) |
| – | Congo | 8 | (12) |
Medal record
African Championship
| Bronze medal – third place | 2022 Dakar |

Joséphine Nkou (born 18 September 1997) is a Congolese/French handball player for Paris 92 and the Congolese national team.

She participated at the 2021 World Women's Handball Championship in Spain.
