= Kimberley Rutil =

Congolese handball player

Personal information
- Nationality: Congolese
- Born: 5 August 1996 (age 30) Courcouronnes, France
- Height: 1.80 m (5 ft 11 in)

Sport
- Sport: Handball
- Position: Right back
- Current club: Sambre Avesnois HB
- Number: 5

Senior clubs
- Years: Team
- 2013-2020: Saint Michel Sports
- 2020-2024: Stella Saint-Maur Handball
- 2024-: Sambre Avesnois HB
National team
Years	Team	Apps	(Gls)
–	Congo	0	(0)
Medal record
African Championship
Bronze medal – third place	2022 Dakar

Kimberley Rutil (born 5 August 1996) is a Congolese-French handball player for Sambre Avesnois HB and the Congolese national team.

She participated at the 2021 World Women's Handball Championship in Spain, where Congo finished 23th. In 2022 she won bronze medals at the 2022 African Championship.
