= 2022 African Women's Handball Championship =

International handball competition

Tournament details
- Host country: Senegal
- Venue: 1 (in 1 host city)
- Dates: 9–19 November
- Teams: 13 (from 1 confederation)

Final positions
- Champions: Angola (15th title)
- Runners-up: Cameroon
- Third place: Congo
- Fourth place: Senegal

Tournament statistics
- Matches played: 40
- Goals scored: 2,023 (50.58 per match)
- Top scorers: (Egypt) Mariam Omar Ibrahim (45 goals)

Awards
- Best player: (Angola) Helena Paulo

The 2022 African Women's Handball Championship was the 25th edition of the African Women's Handball Championship, which took place from 9 to 19 November 2022, in Dakar, Senegal. The tournament was held under the aegis of African Handball Confederation and acted as the African qualifying tournament for the 2023 World Women's Handball Championship, with the top four teams qualifying.

Angola won their 15th title after defeating Cameroon in the final.

== Draw ==
The draw took place on 28 September 2022 in Dakar, Senegal.

== Preliminary round ==
All times are local (UTC±0).

=== Group A ===
Pos	Team	Pld	W	D	L	GF	GA	GD	Pts	Qualification
1	Angola	3	3	0	0	102	54	+48	6	Quarterfinals
2	DR Congo	3	2	0	1	81	77	+4	4	Quarterfinals
3	Algeria	3	1	0	2	76	91	−15	2	Presidents Cup
4	Cape Verde	3	0	0	3	64	101	−37	0	Presidents Cup

Rules for classification: 1) points; 2) head-to-head points; 3) head-to-head goal difference; 4) head-to-head number of goals scored; 5) goal difference.

10 November 2022; 16:00	DR Congo	27–19	Cape Verde	Dakar Arena, Dakar; Referees: S. Haggui, R. Haggui (TUN)
10 November 2022; 16:00	Mwamba 7	(13–8)	Correia 4	Dakar Arena, Dakar; Referees: S. Haggui, R. Haggui (TUN)
10 November 2022; 16:00	1× (yellow card) 5× (suspension)	Report	2× (suspension)	Dakar Arena, Dakar; Referees: S. Haggui, R. Haggui (TUN)

10 November 2022; 18:00	Angola	29–17	Algeria	Dakar Arena, Dakar; Referees: H. El-Saied, Y. El-Saied (EGY)
10 November 2022; 18:00	Cazanga 6	(13–5)	Djabour 5	Dakar Arena, Dakar; Referees: H. El-Saied, Y. El-Saied (EGY)
10 November 2022; 18:00	1× (yellow card) 4× (suspension)	Report	1× (yellow card) 4× (suspension)	Dakar Arena, Dakar; Referees: H. El-Saied, Y. El-Saied (EGY)

13 November 2022; 14:00	Algeria	23–32	DR Congo	Dakar Arena, Dakar; Referees: Faye, Diop (SEN)
13 November 2022; 14:00	Bouguerch, Smail 3	(10–16)	Pina 8	Dakar Arena, Dakar; Referees: Faye, Diop (SEN)
13 November 2022; 14:00	2× (suspension)	Report	1× (yellow card) 2× (suspension)	Dakar Arena, Dakar; Referees: Faye, Diop (SEN)

13 November 2022; 16:00	Cape Verde	15–38	Angola	Dakar Arena, Dakar; Referees: Belkhiri, Hamidi (ALG)
13 November 2022; 16:00	Almeida 3	(9–18)	Santos 12	Dakar Arena, Dakar; Referees: Belkhiri, Hamidi (ALG)
13 November 2022; 16:00	7× (suspension)	Report	5× (suspension)	Dakar Arena, Dakar; Referees: Belkhiri, Hamidi (ALG)

14 November 2022; 14:00	Cape Verde	30–36	Algeria	Dakar Arena, Dakar; Referees: H. El-Saied, Y. El-Saied (EGY)
14 November 2022; 14:00	Coelho 9	(11–19)	Zazai 14	Dakar Arena, Dakar; Referees: H. El-Saied, Y. El-Saied (EGY)
14 November 2022; 14:00	2× (yellow card) 3× (suspension)	Report	1× (yellow card) 4× (suspension)	Dakar Arena, Dakar; Referees: H. El-Saied, Y. El-Saied (EGY)

14 November 2022; 18:00	Angola	35–22	DR Congo	Dakar Arena, Dakar; Referees: Odou, Namadjia (GAB)
14 November 2022; 18:00	Cazanga 7	(17–14)	Mwamba 8	Dakar Arena, Dakar; Referees: Odou, Namadjia (GAB)
14 November 2022; 18:00	1× (yellow card) 5× (suspension)	Report	3× (suspension)	Dakar Arena, Dakar; Referees: Odou, Namadjia (GAB)

=== Group B ===
Pos	Team	Pld	W	D	L	GF	GA	GD	Pts	Qualification
1	Congo	4	4	0	0	109	88	+21	8	Quarterfinals
2	Egypt	4	3	0	1	99	84	+15	6	Quarterfinals
3	Tunisia	4	2	0	2	112	95	+17	4	Quarterfinals
4	Guinea	4	1	0	3	94	110	−16	2	Presidents Cup
5	Morocco	4	0	0	4	92	129	−37	0	Presidents Cup

Rules for classification: 1) points; 2) head-to-head points; 3) head-to-head goal difference; 4) head-to-head number of goals scored; 5) goal difference.

9 November 2022; 11:00	Morocco	25–35	Tunisia	Dakar Arena, Dakar; Referees: Faye, Diop (SEN)
9 November 2022; 11:00	Fehri, Malandran 5	(14–18)	Ben Abdalah 7	Dakar Arena, Dakar; Referees: Faye, Diop (SEN)
9 November 2022; 11:00	1× (yellow card) 4× (suspension)	Report	2× (yellow card) 2× (suspension)	Dakar Arena, Dakar; Referees: Faye, Diop (SEN)

9 November 2022; 13:00	Congo	25–21	Guinea	Dakar Arena, Dakar; Referees: Lowi, Stancu (ROU)
9 November 2022; 13:00	Nguekwian 6	(12–7)	Tandjan 6	Dakar Arena, Dakar; Referees: Lowi, Stancu (ROU)
9 November 2022; 13:00	1× (yellow card) 5× (suspension)	Report	1× (yellow card) 2× (suspension)	Dakar Arena, Dakar; Referees: Lowi, Stancu (ROU)

10 November 2022; 12:00	Egypt	20–21	Congo	Dakar Arena, Dakar; Referees: Faye, Diop (SEN)
10 November 2022; 12:00	Omar, Yahya 4	(9–11)	Zoubabela 6	Dakar Arena, Dakar; Referees: Faye, Diop (SEN)
10 November 2022; 12:00	3× (suspension)	Report	1× (yellow card) 2× (suspension)	Dakar Arena, Dakar; Referees: Faye, Diop (SEN)

10 November 2022; 14:00	Tunisia	36–23	Guinea	Dakar Arena, Dakar; Referees: Odou, Namadjia (GAB)
10 November 2022; 14:00	Hachana 8	(16–9)	Fofana 8	Dakar Arena, Dakar; Referees: Odou, Namadjia (GAB)
10 November 2022; 14:00	7× (suspension) 1× (red card)	Report	5× (suspension) 1× (red card)	Dakar Arena, Dakar; Referees: Odou, Namadjia (GAB)

11 November 2022; 14:00	Guinea	28–20	Morocco	Dakar Arena, Dakar; Referees: H. El-Saied, Y. El-Saied (EGY)
11 November 2022; 14:00	Kanté 8	(13–8)	Ben Chayhab 4	Dakar Arena, Dakar; Referees: H. El-Saied, Y. El-Saied (EGY)
11 November 2022; 14:00	7× (suspension)	Report	3× (suspension)	Dakar Arena, Dakar; Referees: H. El-Saied, Y. El-Saied (EGY)

11 November 2022; 16:00	Egypt	22–21	Tunisia	Dakar Arena, Dakar; Referees: Belkhiri, Hamidi (ALG)
11 November 2022; 16:00	Omar 5	(11–9)	Hachana 5	Dakar Arena, Dakar; Referees: Belkhiri, Hamidi (ALG)
11 November 2022; 16:00	2× (suspension)	Report	2× (yellow card) 2× (suspension)	Dakar Arena, Dakar; Referees: Belkhiri, Hamidi (ALG)

13 November 2022; 12:00	Morocco	20–28	Egypt	Dakar Arena, Dakar; Referees: Odou, Namadjia (GAB)
13 November 2022; 12:00	Fehri 6	(4–13)	Omar 11	Dakar Arena, Dakar; Referees: Odou, Namadjia (GAB)
13 November 2022; 12:00	1× (yellow card) 4× (suspension)	Report	4× (suspension)	Dakar Arena, Dakar; Referees: Odou, Namadjia (GAB)

13 November 2022; 18:00	Tunisia	20–25	Congo	Dakar Arena, Dakar; Referees: Faye, Diop (SEN)
13 November 2022; 18:00	Hachana 6	(9–14)	Yimga 7	Dakar Arena, Dakar; Referees: Faye, Diop (SEN)
13 November 2022; 18:00	1× (suspension)	Report	2× (yellow card) 7× (suspension)	Dakar Arena, Dakar; Referees: Faye, Diop (SEN)

14 November 2022; 12:00	Guinea	22–29	Egypt	Dakar Arena, Dakar; Referees: Lovin, Stancu (ROU)
14 November 2022; 12:00	Tandjan 8	(10–12)	Omar 8	Dakar Arena, Dakar; Referees: Lovin, Stancu (ROU)
14 November 2022; 12:00	1× (yellow card) 2× (suspension)	Report	1× (yellow card) 1× (suspension)	Dakar Arena, Dakar; Referees: Lovin, Stancu (ROU)

14 November 2022; 16:00	Congo	38–27	Morocco	Dakar Arena, Dakar; Referees: Faye, Diop (SEN)
14 November 2022; 16:00	Dorson 9	(17–15)	three players 6	Dakar Arena, Dakar; Referees: Faye, Diop (SEN)
14 November 2022; 16:00	1× (yellow card) 6× (suspension)	Report	1× (yellow card) 1× (suspension)	Dakar Arena, Dakar; Referees: Faye, Diop (SEN)

=== Group C ===
Pos	Team	Pld	W	D	L	GF	GA	GD	Pts	Qualification
1	Cameroon	3	3	0	0	98	52	+46	6	Quarterfinals
2	Senegal (H)	3	2	0	1	98	52	+46	4	Quarterfinals
3	Ivory Coast	3	1	0	2	71	73	−2	2	Quarterfinals
4	Madagascar	3	0	0	3	32	122	−90	0	Presidents Cup

Rules for classification: 1) points; 2) head-to-head points; 3) head-to-head goal difference; 4) head-to-head number of goals scored; 5) goal difference.
(H) Hosts

9 November 2022; 15:00	Cameroon	28–16	Ivory Coast	Dakar Arena, Dakar; Referees: Belkhiri, Hamidi (ALG)
9 November 2022; 15:00	Ekoh 5	(12–7)	three players 3	Dakar Arena, Dakar; Referees: Belkhiri, Hamidi (ALG)
9 November 2022; 15:00	4× (suspension)	Report	3× (suspension)	Dakar Arena, Dakar; Referees: Belkhiri, Hamidi (ALG)

9 November 2022; 20:30	Senegal	40–9	Madagascar	Dakar Arena, Dakar; Referees: H. El-Saied, Y. El-Saied (EGY)
9 November 2022; 20:30	Sy 7	(25–5)	Ratovomahenina 3	Dakar Arena, Dakar; Referees: H. El-Saied, Y. El-Saied (EGY)
9 November 2022; 20:30		Report	4× (suspension)	Dakar Arena, Dakar; Referees: H. El-Saied, Y. El-Saied (EGY)

11 November 2022; 12:00	Madagascar	9–42	Cameroon	Dakar Arena, Dakar; Referees: Lovib, Stancu (ROU)
11 November 2022; 12:00	Raoelimalala 3	(5–23)	Ateba 9	Dakar Arena, Dakar; Referees: Lovib, Stancu (ROU)
11 November 2022; 12:00	2× (suspension)	Report	1× (suspension)	Dakar Arena, Dakar; Referees: Lovib, Stancu (ROU)

11 November 2022; 18:00	Ivory Coast	15–31	Senegal	Dakar Arena, Dakar; Referees: Lovin, Stancu (ROU)
11 November 2022; 18:00	Kouakou 6	(2–14)	Sagna 5	Dakar Arena, Dakar; Referees: Lovin, Stancu (ROU)
11 November 2022; 18:00	3× (suspension)	Report	1× (yellow card) 4× (suspension)	Dakar Arena, Dakar; Referees: Lovin, Stancu (ROU)

14 November 2022; 10:00	Madagascar	14–40	Ivory Coast	Dakar Arena, Dakar; Referees: S. Haggui, R. Haggui (TUN)
14 November 2022; 10:00	Randrianarison 7	(7–20)	N. Traoré 13	Dakar Arena, Dakar; Referees: S. Haggui, R. Haggui (TUN)
14 November 2022; 10:00	6× (suspension)	Report	2× (yellow card) 2× (suspension)	Dakar Arena, Dakar; Referees: S. Haggui, R. Haggui (TUN)

14 November 2022; 20:00	Cameroon	28–27	Senegal	Dakar Arena, Dakar; Referees: Belkhiri, Hamidi (ALG)
14 November 2022; 20:00	Touba 6	(18–16)	Sagna 6	Dakar Arena, Dakar; Referees: Belkhiri, Hamidi (ALG)
14 November 2022; 20:00	2× (suspension)	Report	2× (suspension)	Dakar Arena, Dakar; Referees: Belkhiri, Hamidi (ALG)

=== Ranking of third-placed teams ===
In Group B, the result against the last-placed team was omitted.

Pos	Grp	Team	Pld	W	D	L	GF	GA	GD	Pts	Qualification
1	B	Tunisia	3	1	0	2	77	70	+7	2	Quarterfinals
2	C	Ivory Coast	3	1	0	2	71	73	−2	2	Quarterfinals
3	A	Algeria	3	1	0	2	76	91	−15	2	Presidents Cup

Rules for classification: 1) points; 2) head-to-head points; 3) head-to-head goal difference; 4) head-to-head number of goals scored; 5) goal difference.

== Presidents Cup ==
=== 9–13th place semifinals ===
16 November 2022; 09:00	Algeria	25–23	Morocco	Dakar Arena, Dakar; Referees: S. Haggui, R. Haggui (TUN)
16 November 2022; 09:00	Makhloufi 6	(13–15)	El Ouaddaf, Zouiguira 5	Dakar Arena, Dakar; Referees: S. Haggui, R. Haggui (TUN)
16 November 2022; 09:00	1× (yellow card) 4× (suspension)	Report	1× (suspension)	Dakar Arena, Dakar; Referees: S. Haggui, R. Haggui (TUN)

=== Round-robin ===
Pos	Team	Pld	W	D	L	GF	GA	GD	Pts	Qualification
1	Guinea	2	2	0	0	70	34	+36	4	Ninth place game
2	Cape Verde	2	1	0	1	55	42	+13	2	Eleventh place game
3	Madagascar	2	0	0	2	30	79	−49	0	13th place

Rules for classification: 1) points; 2) head-to-head points; 3) head-to-head goal difference; 4) head-to-head number of goals scored; 5) goal difference.

16 November 2022; 10:45	Cape Verde	20–26	Guinea	Dakar Arena, Dakar; Referees: Faye, Diop (SEN)
16 November 2022; 10:45	Rodrigues 7	(12–14)	Tandjan 7	Dakar Arena, Dakar; Referees: Faye, Diop (SEN)
16 November 2022; 10:45	5× (suspension)	Report	1× (yellow card) 4× (suspension)	Dakar Arena, Dakar; Referees: Faye, Diop (SEN)

17 November 2022; 11:00	Madagascar	14–44	Guinea	Dakar Arena, Dakar; Referees: Odou, Namadjia (GAB)
17 November 2022; 11:00	Ratovomahenina 8	(5–21)	Macire 8	Dakar Arena, Dakar; Referees: Odou, Namadjia (GAB)
17 November 2022; 11:00	1× (yellow card) 6× (suspension)	Report		Dakar Arena, Dakar; Referees: Odou, Namadjia (GAB)

18 November 2022; 14:00	Madagascar	16–35	Cape Verde	Dakar Arena, Dakar; Referees: S. Haggui, R. Haggui (TUN)
18 November 2022; 14:00	Raoelimalala 6	(3–15)	Carvalho, Coelho 7	Dakar Arena, Dakar; Referees: S. Haggui, R. Haggui (TUN)
18 November 2022; 14:00	1× (yellow card) 1× (suspension)	Report		Dakar Arena, Dakar; Referees: S. Haggui, R. Haggui (TUN)

=== Bracket ===
9–13th place semifinals
16 November
Algeria	25
Morocco	23

Ninth place game
19 November
Algeria	26
Guinea	29
Eleventh place game
19 November
Morocco	29
Cape Verde	24

=== Eleventh place game ===
19 November 2022; 12:00	Morocco	29–24	Cape Verde	Dakar Arena, Dakar; Referees: Faye, Diop (SEN)
19 November 2022; 12:00	Zouiguira 7	(19–10)	Tavares 8	Dakar Arena, Dakar; Referees: Faye, Diop (SEN)
19 November 2022; 12:00	1× (suspension)	Report	3× (suspension)	Dakar Arena, Dakar; Referees: Faye, Diop (SEN)

=== Ninth place game ===
19 November 2022; 14:00	Algeria	26–29	Guinea	Dakar Arena, Dakar; Referees: Lovin, Stancu (ROU)
19 November 2022; 14:00	Zazai 6	(14–17)	Tandjan 8	Dakar Arena, Dakar; Referees: Lovin, Stancu (ROU)
19 November 2022; 14:00	6× (suspension)	Report	1× (yellow card) 4× (suspension)	Dakar Arena, Dakar; Referees: Lovin, Stancu (ROU)

== Knockout stage ==
=== Bracket ===
Quarter-finals
16 November
Angola	29
Tunisia	24
16 November
Egypt	19
Senegal	21
16 November
Ivory Coast	21
Congo	35
16 November
Cameroon	23
DR Congo	22

Semi-finals
17 November
Angola (ET)	24
Senegal	21
17 November
Congo	25
Cameroon	27

Final
19 November
Angola	29
Cameroon	19
Third place
19 November
Senegal	19
Congo	20

5–8th place bracket

5–8th place semifinals
17 November
Tunisia (Pen.)	21 (3)
Egypt	21 (1)
17 November
Ivory Coast	26
DR Congo	31

Fifth place game
18 November
Tunisia	28
DR Congo	24
Seventh place game
18 November
Egypt	24
Ivory Coast	27

=== Quarterfinals ===
16 November 2022; 12:45	Angola	29–24	Tunisia	Dakar Arena, Dakar
16 November 2022; 12:45		(16–12)		Dakar Arena, Dakar

16 November 2022; 15:00	Ivory Coast	21–35	Congo	Dakar Arena, Dakar; Referees: Odou, Namadjia (GAB)
16 November 2022; 15:00	Koffi 5	(13–16)	Jappont, Yimga 6	Dakar Arena, Dakar; Referees: Odou, Namadjia (GAB)
16 November 2022; 15:00	11× (suspension)	Report	1× (yellow card) 6× (suspension)	Dakar Arena, Dakar; Referees: Odou, Namadjia (GAB)

16 November 2022; 17:15	Cameroon	23–22	DR Congo	Dakar Arena, Dakar; Referees: H. El-Saied, Y. El-Saied (EGY)
16 November 2022; 17:15	Eyenga 5	(15–11)	Mwamba 8	Dakar Arena, Dakar; Referees: H. El-Saied, Y. El-Saied (EGY)
16 November 2022; 17:15	1× (yellow card) 5× (suspension)	Report	1× (yellow card) 4× (suspension)	Dakar Arena, Dakar; Referees: H. El-Saied, Y. El-Saied (EGY)

16 November 2022; 19:30	Egypt	19–21	Senegal	Dakar Arena, Dakar; Referees: Lovin, Stancu (ROU)
16 November 2022; 19:30	Yahya 4	(7–9)	Keïta 5	Dakar Arena, Dakar; Referees: Lovin, Stancu (ROU)
16 November 2022; 19:30	1× (yellow card) 2× (suspension)	Report	3× (suspension)	Dakar Arena, Dakar; Referees: Lovin, Stancu (ROU)

=== 5–8th place semifinals ===
17 November 2022
13:00
Tunisia
24–22
Egypt
Dakar Arena, Dakar
Referees: Faye, Diop (SEN)
Gmar 6
(11–9)
Omar 8
1× (yellow card) 1× (suspension) 1× (red card)
Report
1× (yellow card) 2× (suspension)

FT: 21–21 Pen: 3–1

17 November 2022; 15:00	Ivory Coast	26–31	DR Congo	Dakar Arena, Dakar; Referees: S. Haggui, R. Haggui (TUN)
17 November 2022; 15:00	Koffi 7	(11–15)	Kabamba 8	Dakar Arena, Dakar; Referees: S. Haggui, R. Haggui (TUN)
17 November 2022; 15:00	4× (suspension)	Report	2× (yellow card) 3× (suspension)	Dakar Arena, Dakar; Referees: S. Haggui, R. Haggui (TUN)

=== Semifinals ===
17 November 2022; 17:00	Congo	25–27	Cameroon	Dakar Arena, Dakar; Referees: Lovin, Stancu (ROU)
17 November 2022; 17:00	Yimga 5	(14–12)	Ebanga 10	Dakar Arena, Dakar; Referees: Lovin, Stancu (ROU)
17 November 2022; 17:00	1× (suspension)	Report	1× (yellow card) 5× (suspension)	Dakar Arena, Dakar; Referees: Lovin, Stancu (ROU)

17 November 2022
19:30
Angola
24–21 (ET)
Senegal
Dakar Arena, Dakar
Referees: Belkhiri, Hamidi (ALG)
Venâncio 6
(12–10)
Sagna 9
1× (yellow card) 2× (suspension)
Report
1× (yellow card) 1× (suspension)

FT: 20–20 ET: 4–1

=== Seventh place game ===
18 November 2022; 16:00	Egypt	24–27	Ivory Coast	Dakar Arena, Dakar; Referees: Chouraki, Hamidi (ALG)
18 November 2022; 16:00	Omar 7	(12–17)	Koffi 7	Dakar Arena, Dakar; Referees: Chouraki, Hamidi (ALG)
18 November 2022; 16:00		Report	2× (suspension)	Dakar Arena, Dakar; Referees: Chouraki, Hamidi (ALG)

=== Fifth place game ===
18 November 2022; 18:00	Tunisia	28–24	DR Congo	Dakar Arena, Dakar; Referees: Faye, Diop (SEN)
18 November 2022; 18:00	Aouij 9	(13–10)	Pina 6	Dakar Arena, Dakar; Referees: Faye, Diop (SEN)
18 November 2022; 18:00	2× (suspension)	Report	1× (yellow card)	Dakar Arena, Dakar; Referees: Faye, Diop (SEN)

=== Third place game ===
19 November 2022; 16:30	Congo	20–19	Senegal	Dakar Arena, Dakar; Referees: Odou, Namadjia (GAB)
19 November 2022; 16:30	Diagouraga 5	(12–10)	Dapina 4	Dakar Arena, Dakar; Referees: Odou, Namadjia (GAB)
19 November 2022; 16:30	1× (yellow card) 4× (suspension)	Report	1× (yellow card) 2× (suspension)	Dakar Arena, Dakar; Referees: Odou, Namadjia (GAB)

=== Final ===
19 November 2022; 19:00	Cameroon	19–29	Angola	Dakar Arena, Dakar; Referees: H. El-Saied, Y. El-Saied (EGY)
19 November 2022; 19:00	Ebanga 6	(10–13)	Santos 11	Dakar Arena, Dakar; Referees: H. El-Saied, Y. El-Saied (EGY)
19 November 2022; 19:00	5× (suspension) 1× (red card)	Report	3× (suspension)	Dakar Arena, Dakar; Referees: H. El-Saied, Y. El-Saied (EGY)

== Final standing ==
Rank	Team
1st place, gold medalist(s)	Angola
2nd place, silver medalist(s)	Cameroon
3rd place, bronze medalist(s)	Congo
4	Senegal
5	Tunisia
6	DR Congo
7	Ivory Coast
8	Egypt
9	Guinea
10	Algeria
11	Morocco
12	Cape Verde
13	Madagascar

Team qualified for the 2023 World Championship

== All-Star team ==
The All-star team was announced on 21 November 2022.

Position	Player
Goalkeeper	(Cameroon) Noelle Mben
Right wing	(Angola) Juliana Machado
Right back	(Cameroon) Paola Ebanga Baboga
Centre back	(Senegal) Soukeina Sagna
Left back	(Cameroon) Karichma Ekoh
Left wing	(Angola) Natália Bernardo
Pivot	(Angola) Liliana Venâncio
MVP	(Angola) Helena Paulo
