= Congo women's national handball team =

(Republic of the Congo) Congo

Information
- Association: Congolese Handball Federation
- Coach: Younes Tatby
- Assistant coach: Jean Malonga

Colours
1st	2nd

Results

Summer Olympics
- Appearances: 1 (First in 1980)
- Best result: 6th (1980)

World Championship
- Appearances: 7 (First in 1982)
- Best result: 12th (1982)

African Championship
- Appearances: 25 (First in 1976)
- Best result: 1st (1979, 1981, 1983, 1985)
- Last updated on Unknown.

The Congo women's national handball team is the national team of Republic of the Congo (from 1970 to 1991 the People's Republic of the Congo). It takes part in international handball competitions.

The team participated at the 1980 Summer Olympics, where they placed sixth.

They participated at the World Women's Handball Championship in 1982, 1999, 2001, 2007 and 2009.

== Results ==
=== Olympic Games ===
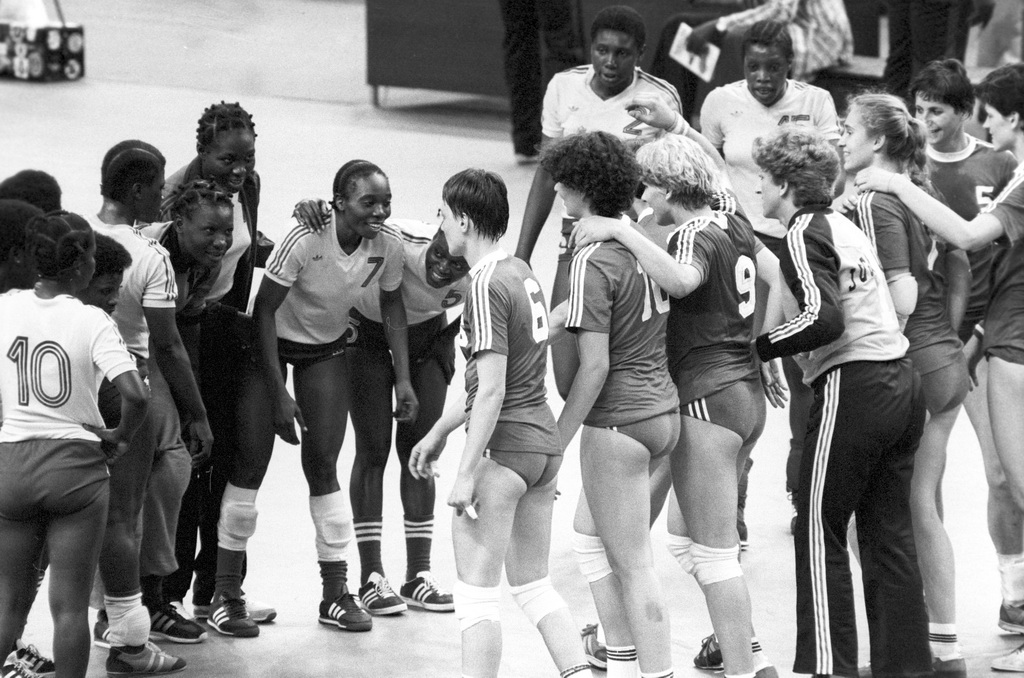
Handball Congo vs. SFRY - 1980 Summer Olympics - Moscou

- 1980 – 6th place

=== World Championship ===
- 1982 – 12th place
- 1999 – 22nd place
- 2001 – 22nd place
- 2007 – 17th place
- 2009 – 20th place
- 2021 – 23rd place
- 2023 – 26th place

=== African Championship ===
- 1976 – 2nd place
- 1979 – 1st place
- 1981 – 1st place
- 1983 – 1st place
- 1985 – 1st place
- 1987 – 3rd place
- 1989 – 3rd place
- 1991 – 3rd place
- 1992 – 2nd place
- 1994 – 4th place
- 1996 – 4th place
- 1998 – 2nd place
- 2000 – 2nd place
- 2002 – 6th place
- 2004 – 5th place
- 2006 – 3rd place
- 2008 – 3rd place
- 2010 – 5th place
- 2012 – 6th place
- 2014 – 5th place
- 2016 – 4th place
- 2018 – 5th place
- 2021 – 4th place
- 2022 – 3rd place
- 2024 – 6th place
- 2026 – Qualified

== Team ==
=== Current squad ===
Roster for the 2023 World Women's Handball Championship.

Head coach: Younes Tatby

No.	Pos.	Name	Date of birth (age)	Height	App.	Goals	Club
1	GK	Ruth Kodia	13 January 1992 (age 34)	1.73 m	18	0	(Republic of the Congo) Étoile du Congo
2	RB	Jonedie Olikaka	31 July 2004 (age 22)	1.71 m	7	5	(Morocco) Union Sportive Nouacer
5	LW	Kimberley Rutil	5 August 1996 (age 30)	1.80 m	17	18	(France) Stella Saint-Maur Handball
6	LW	Klenn Divoko	21 June 1993 (age 33)	1.79 m	27	17	(France) US Cagnes Handball
7	LB	Diane Yimga	27 April 1992 (age 34)	1.83 m	21	25	(France) Carros HBC
8	CB	Ruptia Mouele	29 June 1991 (age 35)	1.61 m	17	6	(Republic of the Congo) DGSP
10	RB	Mercianne Hendo	19 January 1997 (age 29)	1.63 m	4	3	(Republic of the Congo) DGSP
11	RW	Hermida Mongo	7 October 1994 (age 32)	1.67 m	16	6	(Republic of the Congo) DGSP
12	GK	Malvina Apendi	7 January 1998 (age 28)	1.72 m	12	0	(France) Tournefeuille Handball
13	RW	Grace Zoubabela	17 March 1993 (age 33)	1.73 m	19	11	(Republic of the Congo) DGSP
15	CB	Eugenia Domingos	16 November 1990 (age 35)	1.75 m	0	0	(Republic of the Congo) Otoho Handball
20	GK	Alicia Ntessi	20 January 2000 (age 26)	1.80 m	5	0	(France) Reims Champagne Handball
23	LB	Betchaïdelle Ngombele	23 April 2004 (age 22)	1.90 m	28	36	(Slovenia) RK Krim
45	LW	Joséphine Nkou	18 September 1997 (age 29)	1.65 m	14	17	(Italy) ASD Handball Erice
61	P	Rita Saraiva	21 November 1992 (age 33)	1.77 m	22	18	(France) US Cagnes Handball
66	LW	Suzanne Mambou	25 April 1992 (age 34)	1.73 m	29	18	(Republic of the Congo) DGSP
78	CB	Fanta Diagouraga	30 June 2000 (age 26)	1.75 m	17	19	(Romania) CSM Deva
79	P	Sharon Dorson	9 March 1994 (age 32)	1.78 m	22	26	(France) Noisy-le-Grand Handball
99	RB	Kassandra Jappont	21 October 1994 (age 32)	1.78 m	21	19	(France) HBC Thuir
