= Ruth Kodia =

Congolese handball player

Personal information
- Nationality: Congolese
- Born: 13 January 1992 (age 34) Congo
- Height: 1.73 m (5 ft 8 in)

Sport
- Sport: Handball
- Position: Goalkeeper
- Current club: DGSP Brazzaville
National team
| Years | Team | Apps | (Gls) |
| – | Congo | 7 | (0) |
Medal record
African Championship
| Bronze medal – third place | 2022 Dakar |

Ruth Kodia (born 13 January 1992) is a Congolese handball player for DGSP Brazzaville and the Congolese national team.

She participated at the 2021 World Women's Handball Championship in Spain.
