= Rita Saraiva =

Congolese handball player

Personal information
- Nationality: Congolese
- Born: 21 November 1992 (age 33) Central African Republic
- Height: 1.77 m (5 ft 10 in)

Sport
- Sport: Handball
- Position: Line player
- Current club: US Cagnes Handball
National team
Years	Team	Apps	(Gls)
–	Congo	8	(6)

Rita Saraiva (born 21 November 1992) is a Congolese handball player for US Cagnes Handball and the Congolese national team.

She represented Congo at the 2021 World Women's Handball Championship in Spain.
