= Nada Ćorović =

Montenegrin handball player (born 2000)

Personal information
- Nationality: Montenegrin
- Born: 16 December 2000 (age 25) Nikšić, Montenegro, FR Yugoslavia
- Height: 1.80 m (5 ft 11 in)

Sport
- Sport: Handball
- Position: Left back
- Current club: ESBF Besançon
- Number: 43

Youth career
- Years: Team
- 2017–2020: RK Levalea 2010 Nikšić

Senior clubs
- Years: Team
- 2020–2021: IUVENTA Michalovce
- 2021–2022: ŽORK Jagodina
- 2022–: ESBF Besançon
National team
Years	Team	Apps	(Gls)
2023–	Montenegro	14	(4)

Nada Ćorović was born on 16 December 2000 in the city of Nikšić, Montenegro. She is a Montenegrin handball player for ESBF Besançon and the Montenegrin national team.

== Career ==
She made her debut on the Montenegrin national team on 6 April 2023, against Norway.

On 15 April 2022, it was announced that she had signed a two-year contract with ESBF Besançon in France.

She is the sister of fellow handballer Nataša Ćorović.

== Achievements ==
- Serbian Championship :
  - Winner: 2021
- KUP Srbije :
  - Winner: 2021, 2022
- MOL Liga :
  - Winner: 2020
