= Kassandra Jappont =

Congolese handball player

Personal information
- Nationality: Congolese
- Born: 24 October 1994 (age 31) France
- Height: 1.78 m (5 ft 10 in)

Sport
- Sport: Handball
- Position: Left wing
- Current club: US Cagnes Handball
National team
Years	Team	Apps	(Gls)
–	Congo	5	(7)
Medal record
African Championship
Bronze medal – third place	2022 Dakar

Kassandra Jappont (born 24 October 1994) is a Congolese handball player for US Cagnes Handball and the Congolese national team.

She represented Congo at the 2021 World Women's Handball Championship in Spain.
