= Nataša Ćorović =

Montenegrin handballer (born 1999)

Personal information
- Nationality: Montenegrin
- Born: 7 May 1999 (age 27) Nikšić, Montenegro, FR Yugoslavia
- Height: 1.73 m (5 ft 8 in)

Sport
- Sport: Handball
- Position: Centre back
- Current club: ŽRK Budućnost Podgorica
- Number: 5
National team
Years	Team	Apps	(Gls)
2018–	Montenegro	28	(7)
Medal record
European Championship
Bronze medal – third place	2022 Slovenia/North Macedonia/Montenegro

Nataša Ćorović (born 7 May 1999) is a Montenegrin handballer for ŽRK Budućnost Podgorica and the Montenegrin national team.

She represented Montenegro at the 2022 European Women's Handball Championship.

She is the sister of fellow handballer Nada Ćorović.
