= Marie Davidsen =

Norwegian handball player (born 1993)

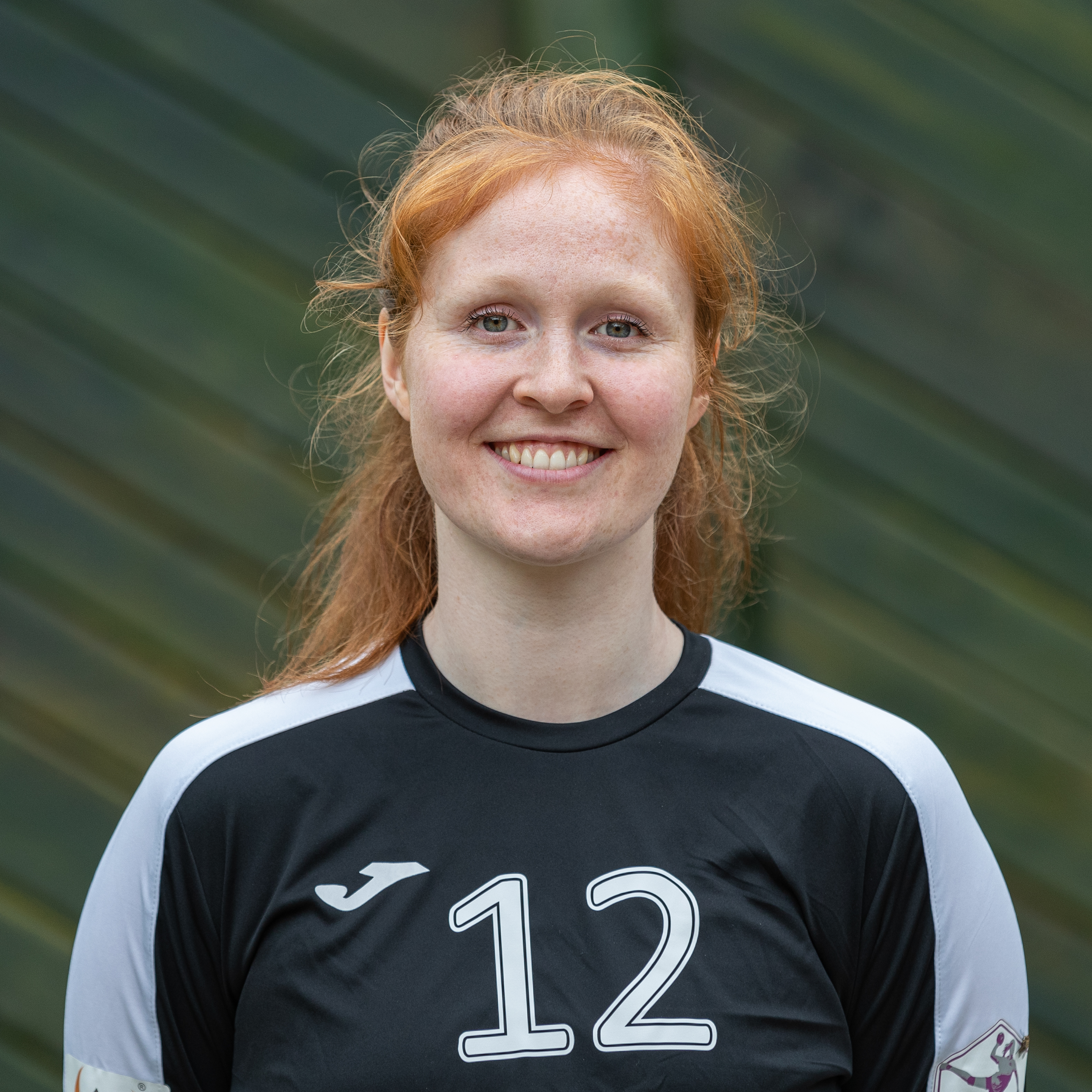

Personal information
- Full name: Marie Skurtveit Davidsen
- Nationality: Norwegian
- Born: 20 August 1993 (age 33) Bergen, Norway
- Height: 1.78 m (5 ft 10 in)

Sport
- Sport: Handball
- Position: Goalkeeper
- Current club: Molde Elite
- Number: 12

Youth career
- Years: Team
- –: Nordre Holsnøy IL

Senior clubs
- Years: Team
- 2012–2019: Tertnes HE
- 2019–2021: Thüringer HC
- 2021–2024: CSM București
- 2024–2025: Molde Elite
- 2025–: Fana
National team
Years	Team	Apps	(Gls)
2022–	Norway	19	(0)
Medal record
World Championship
Silver medal – second place	2023 Denmark/Norway/Sweden
European Championship
Gold medal – first place	2022 Slovenia/North Macedonia/Montenegro

Marie Skurtveit Davidsen (born 20 August 1993) is a Norwegian handball player for Molde Elite and the Norwegian national team.

At the 2022 European Championship, she and Norway won gold. A year later, she won silver medals at the 2023 World Championship, losing to France in the final.
