= Diane Yimga =

Congolese handball player

Personal information
- Nationality: Congolese
- Born: 27 April 1992 (age 34) Cameroon
- Height: 1.83 m (6 ft 0 in)

Sport
- Sport: Handball
- Position: Right wing
- Current club: Reims Champagne HB
National team
Years	Team	Apps	(Gls)
–	Congo	8	(10)

Diane Yimga (born 27 April 1992) is a Congolese handball player for Reims Champagne HB and the Congolese national team.

She participated at the 2021 World Women's Handball Championship in Spain.
