= Noëlle Mben =

Cameroonian handball player (born 1988)

Personal information
- Full name: Isabelle Noëlle Mben Mbediang
- Nationality: Cameroonian
- Born: 5 January 1988 (age 38) Makak, Cameroon
- Height: 1.76 m (5 ft 9 in)

Sport
- Sport: Handball
- Position: Goalkeeper
- Current club: Ortahisar Bld.
- Number: 1
National team
Years	Team	Apps	(Gls)
–	Cameroon	56	(0)
Medal record
African Championship
Silver medal – second place	2022 Dakar
- Updated on 27 October 2023

Isabelle Noëlleelle Mben Mbediang (born 5 January 1988) is a Cameroonian handball player for Ortahisar Bld. and the Cameroonian national team.

She represented Cameroon at the 2017 World Women's Handball Championship in Germany. At the 2022 African Championship she won silver medals, losing to Angola in the final.
