= Raïssa Dapina =

Senegalese handball player (born 1995)

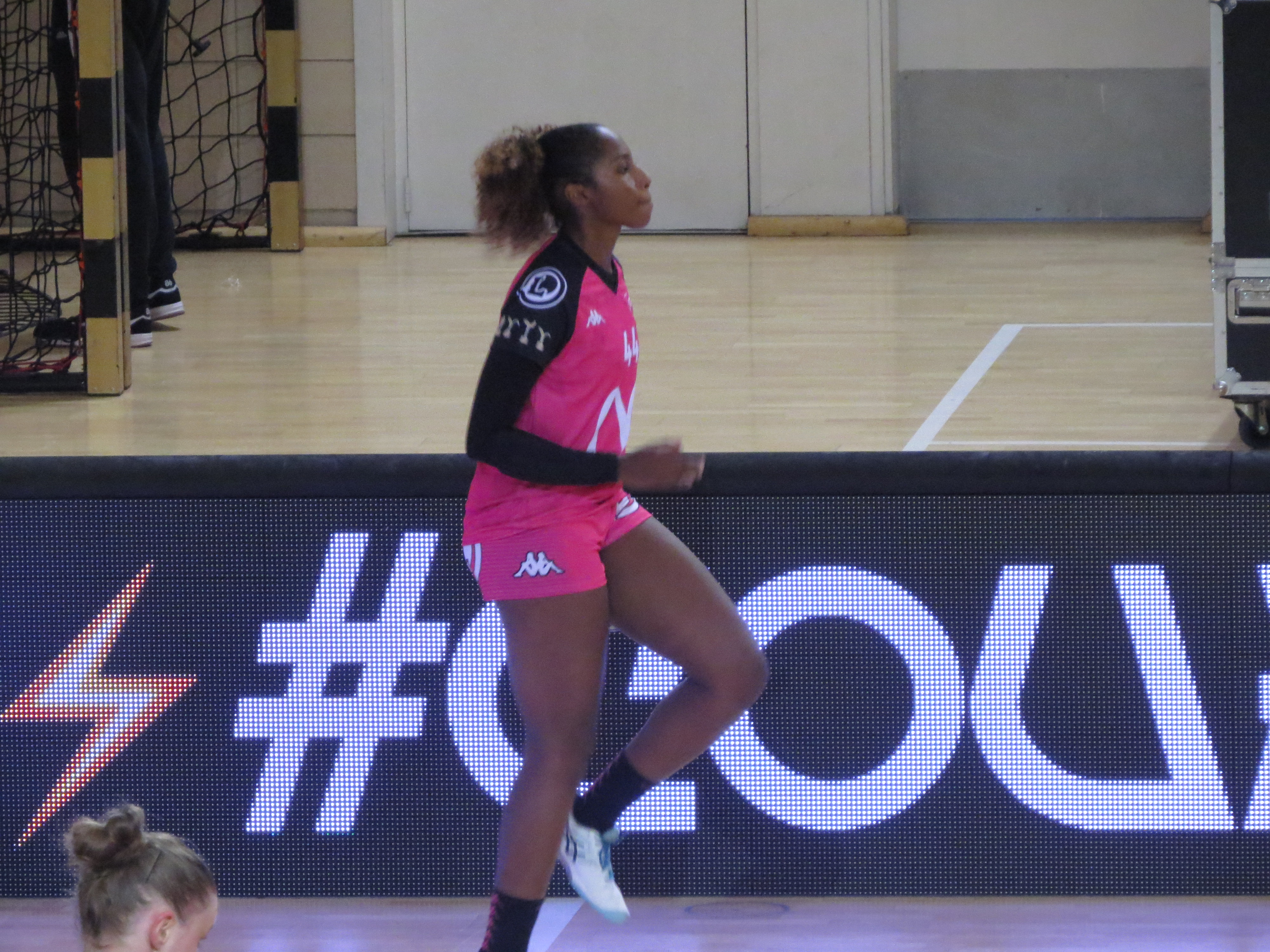

Personal information
- Nationality: French, Senegalese
- Born: 27 September 1995 (age 31) Paris, France
- Height: 1.71 m (5 ft 7 in)

Sport
- Sport: Handball
- Position: Right wing
- Current club: Handball Museldall
- Number: 95

Senior clubs
- Years: Team
- –: Cergy-Pontoise Handball 95
- -2009: Olympique Rodemack
- 2009-2013: Yutz Handball
- 2013-2016: Metz Handball
- 2016-2017: Strasbourg Achenheim Truchtersheim Handball
- 2017-2021: Fleury Loiret HB
- 2021-2023: Neptunes de Nantes
- 2023-2025: OGC Nice Côte d'Azur Handball
- 2025-: HB Museldall
National team
Years	Team	Apps	(Gls)
–	Senegal	28	(65)
Medal record
African Championship
Silver medal – second place	2024 Kinshasa
- Updated on 23 November 2025

Raïssa Dapina (born 27 September 1995) is a French-Senegalese handball player for HB Museldall and the Senegalese national team.

She competed at the 2019 World Women's Handball Championship in Japan and at the 2025 World Women's Handball Championship in Germany.

== Personal life ==
Dapina was born in France and is of Senegalese and Cape Verdean descent.
