= Dienaba Sy =

Senegalese handball player (born 1995)

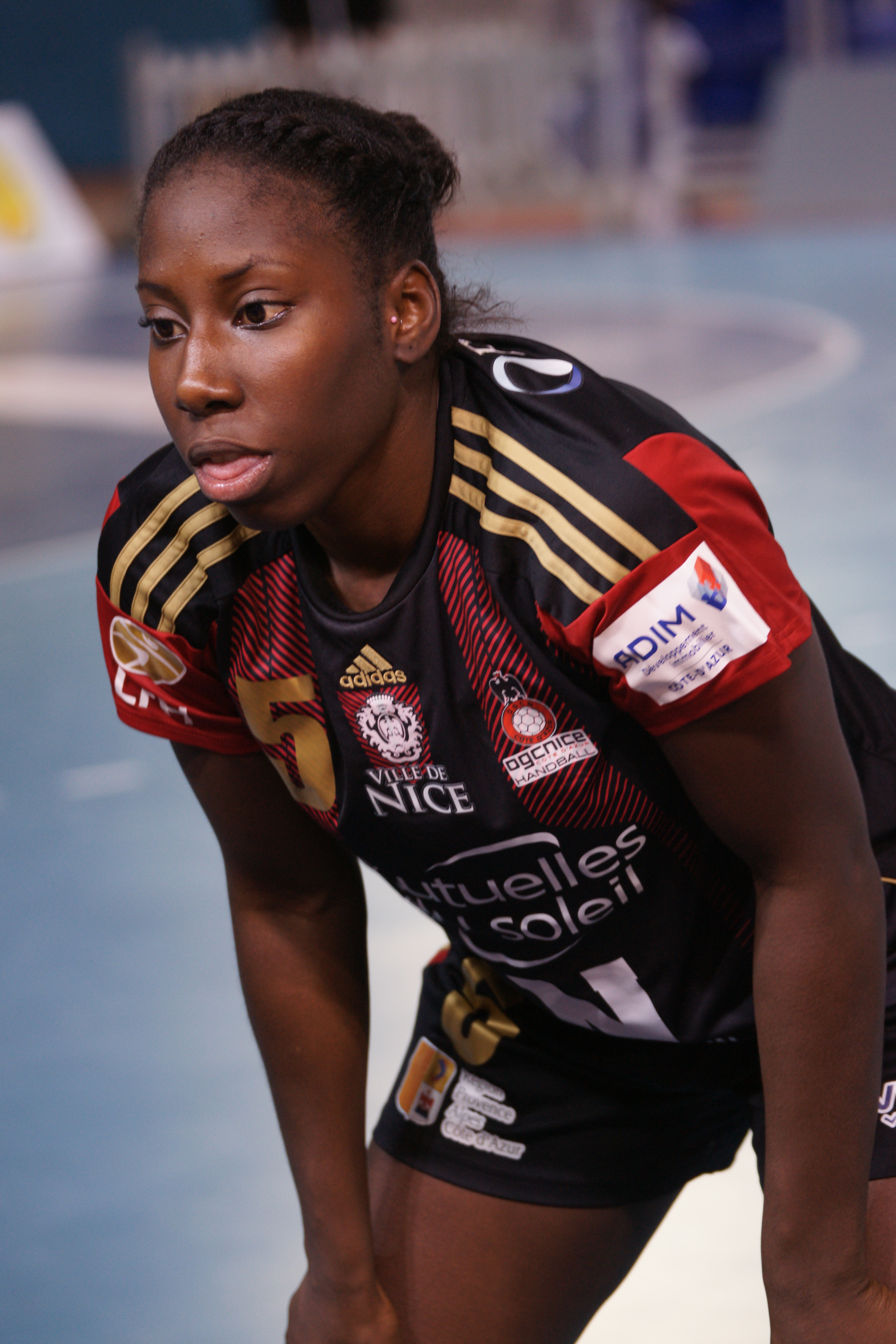

Personal information
- Nationality: Senegalese
- Born: 27 June 1995 (age 31) Montivilliers, France
- Height: 1.65 m (5 ft 5 in)

Sport
- Sport: Handball
- Position: Left wing
- Current club: Nice Handball
- Number: 5

Senior clubs
- Years: Team
- 2012–2014: HB Octeville Sur Mer
- 2014–: Nice Handball
National team
Years	Team	Apps	(Gls)
–	Senegal	17	(21)
Medal record
African Championship
Silver medal – second place	2024 Kinshasa
- Updated on 29 November 2025

Dienaba Sy (born 27 June 1995) is a French-Senegalese handball player for OGC Nice Côte d'Azur Handball and the Senegalese national team.

She competed at the 2019 World Women's Handball Championship in Japan and at the 2025 World Women's Handball Championship in Germany.

At youth levels, she played for the French national team.
