= Sharon Dorson =

Congolese handball player

Personal information
- Nationality: Congolese
- Born: 9 March 1994 (age 32) Ivory Coast
- Height: 1.78 m (5 ft 10 in)

Sport
- Sport: Handball
- Position: Line player
- Current club: Le Havre AC
National team
Years	Team	Apps	(Gls)
–	Congo	8	(7)

Sharon Dorson (born 9 March 1994) is a Congolese handball player for Le Havre AC and the Congolese national team.

She participated at the 2021 World Women's Handball Championship in Spain.
