= Fanta Keïta =

Senegalese handball player (born 1995)

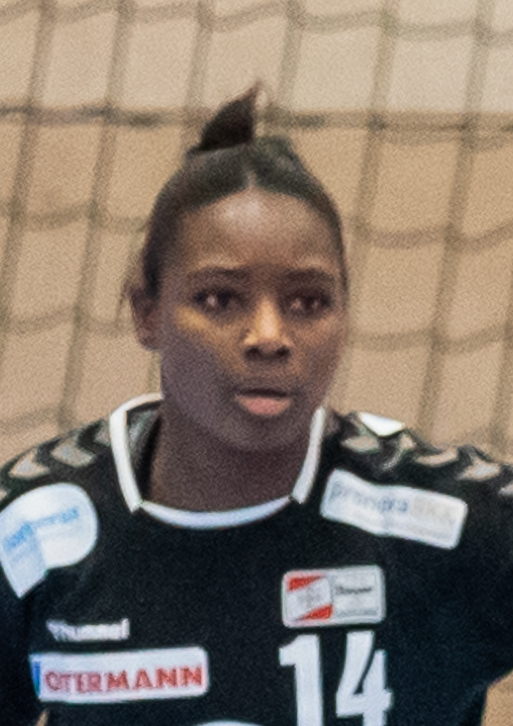

Personal information
- Nationality: Senegalese
- Born: 17 October 1995 (age 31) Paris, France
- Height: 1.72 m (5 ft 8 in)

Sport
- Sport: Handball
- Position: Right back
- Current club: CSM Târgu Jiu
- Number: 14

Youth career
- Years: Team
- 2004-2010: US Ivry HB
- 2010-2014: Issy Paris Hand

Senior clubs
- Years: Team
- -2014: Issy Paris Hand
- 2014-2017: Stella Saint-Maur
- 2017-2019: CJF Fleury Loiret Handball
- 2019-2020: Aunis Handball La Rochelle-Perigny
- 2020-2022: Bayer Leverkusen
- 2022: CJF Fleury Loiret Handball
- 2022-2024: SCM Gloria Buzău
- 2024-: CSM Târgu Jiu
National team
Years	Team	Apps	(Gls)
–	Senegal	22	(43)
- Updated on 9 January 2025

Fanta Keïta (born 17 October 1995) is a Senegalese handball player for Romanian team CSM Târgu Jiu and the Senegalese national team.

She competed at the 2019 World Women's Handball Championship in Japan where the Senegalese team finished 18th. 4 years later she played at the 2023 World Women's Handball Championship, where Senegal again finished 18th.
