= Tunisian Handball Federation =

Governing body of handball in Tunisia

Tunisian Handball Federation French: Fédération Tunisienne de Handball Arabic: الجامعة التونسية لكرة اليد FTHB
- IOC nation: Republic of Tunisia
- Sport: Handball
- Other sports: Beach Handball; Wheelchair Handball
- Official website: www.federationhandball.tn

HISTORY
- Year of formation: October 1956; 69 years ago

AFFILIATIONS
- International federation: International Handball Federation (IHF)
- IHF member since: 1962
- Continental association: African Handball Confederation
- National Olympic Committee: Tunisian Olympic Committee
- Other affiliation(s): Mediterranean Handball Confederation; Arab Handball Federation

GOVERNING BODY
- President: Mr. Karim Helali (Tunisia)

HEADQUARTERS
- Address: Tunis
- Country: Tunisia
- Secretary General: Mr. Ahmed Jemal (Tunisia)

The Tunisian Handball Federation (French: Fédération tunisienne de handball) (FTHB) (Arabic: الجامعة التونسية لكرة اليد), is the national handball association in Tunisia. FTHB organizes team handball within Tunisia and represents Tunisian handball internationally. The federation is a member of the Arab Handball Federation, Mediterranean Handball Confederation, African Handball Confederation (CAHB) and the International Handball Federation (IHF). The president of FTHB is Karim Helali.

== Presidents ==
Period	Head President
1956–1963	(Tunisia) Jalel Agha
1963–1965	(Tunisia) Noureddine Kedidi
1965–1966	(Tunisia) Abdelhamid Bellamine
1966–1974	(Tunisia) Slim Ben Ghachem
1974–1980	(Tunisia) Abdelhamid Mlayeh
1980–1982	(Tunisia) Ali Toumi
1982–1986	(Tunisia) Abderrazak Naccache
1986–1988	(Tunisia) Bechir Ben Aissa
1988–1992	(Tunisia) Mouldi Ayari
1992–1994	(Tunisia) Afif Kilani

Period	Head President
1994–1998	(Tunisia) Rafik Khouaja
1998–2002	(Tunisia) Youssef Kortobi
2002–2004	(Tunisia) Rafik Khouaja
2004–2006	(Tunisia) Youssef Kortobi
2006–2008	(Tunisia) Yassine Boudhina
2008–2012	(Tunisia) Mehdi Khouaja
2012–2014	(Tunisia) Karim Hleli
2014–2021	(Tunisia) Mourad Mestiri
2022–2022	(Tunisia) Youssef Kortobi (interim)
2022–	(Tunisia) Karim Helali

== Honours ==
=== National Team (Men) ===
- Summer Olympics

Eight (1) : 2012

- World Championship

Fourth (1) : 2005

- World Cup

Runner-up (silver) (1) : 2006

- African Championship (Record)

Champions (gold) (10) : 1974, 1976, 1979, 1994, 1998, 2002, 2006, 2010, 2012, 2018
Runner-up (silver) (8) : 1985, 1992, 1996, 2004, 2008, 2014, 2016, 2020
Third Place (bronze) (6) : 1981, 1983, 1987, 1989, 1991, 2000

- African Games

Runner-up (silver) (1) : 1978
Third Place (bronze) (2) : 1965, 2007

- Mediterranean Games

Runner-up (2) : 2001, 2018
Third Place (4) : 1967, 1979, 2005, 2009

- Pan Arab Games

Champions (gold) (1) : 1985
Third Place (bronze) (2) : 1992, 2011

=== National Team (Women) ===
- Summer Olympics

did not qualify

- World Championship

Twelfth (1) : 1975

- African Championship

Champions (gold) (3) : 1974, 1976, 2014
Runner-up (silver) (5) : 1981, 2006, 2010, 2012, 2016
Third Place (bronze) (3) : 2000, 2002, 2021

- African Games

Third Place (bronze) (1) : 1978

- Pan Arab Games

Champions (gold) (1) : 1985
Runner-up (silver) (3) : 1992, 1999, 2011

=== National Junior team (Boys) ===
- Junior World Championship

Third Place (bronze) (1): 2011

- African Junior Championship

Champions (gold) (4) : 2002, 2008, 2012, 2016
Runner-up (silver) (8): 1980, 1998, 2000, 2004, 2006, 2010, 2014, 2018
Third Place (bronze) (5): 1986, 1988, 1990, 1992, 1996

- Arab junior Championship

Champions (gold) (3): 1989, 2001, 2023

=== National Youth team (Boys) ===
- Youth World Championship

Fourth Place (1): 2009

- African Youth Championship

Champions (gold) (1): 2016
Runner-up (silver) (5): 2004, 2008, 2010, 2012, 2018
Third Place (bronze) (1): 2014

- Arab Youth Championship

Champions (gold) (3): 2012, 2017, 2019
Runner-up (silver) (1): 2023
Third Place (bronze) (3): 1995, 2013, 2015

- Maghrebian Youth Championship

Champions (gold) (1): 2019

=== National Junior team (Girls) ===
- Junior World Championship

14th (1): 2001

- African Junior Championship

Champions (gold) (1): 2019
Runner-up (silver) (5) : 1992, 2000, 2004, 2009, 2015
Third Place (bronze) (2): 2011, 2013

=== National Youth team (Girls) ===
- Youth World Championship

11th (1): 2006

- African Youth Championship

Runner-up (silver) (2) : 2013, 2017
Third Place (bronze) (1): 2011

=== Beach National Team (Men) ===
- Mediterranean Beach Games

Champions (1) : 2015

- African Beach Games

Champions (2) (gold) : 2019, 2023

- Beach Handball Global Tour

Champions (1) (gold) : 2023

=== Beach National Team (Women) ===
- Mediterranean Beach Games

Fourth (1) : 2015

- African Beach Games

Champions (2) (gold) : 2019, 2023

- Beach Handball Global Tour

Champions (1) (gold) : 2023

== See also ==
- Tunisia men's national handball team
- Tunisia women's national handball team
- Tunisia men's national junior handball team
- Tunisia men's national youth handball team
- Tunisia women's national junior handball team
- Tunisia women's national youth handball team

Other handball codes

- Tunisia national beach handball team
- Tunisia women's national beach handball team
