= DR Congo men's national handball team =

DR Congo

Information
- Association: Democratic Republic of the Congo Handball Federation
- Coach: Francis Tuzolana

Colours
1st	2nd

Results

World Championship
- Appearances: 1 (First in 2021)
- Best result: 28th (2021)

African Championship
- Appearances: 14 (First in 1992)
- Best result: 4th (1992, 2010)
- Last updated on Unknown.

The Democratic Republic of the Congo national men’s handball team is the national handball team of the DR Congo.

== Results ==
=== World Championship ===
- 2021 – 28th place

=== African Nations Championship ===
Year	Position
Tunisia 1974	Did not participate
Algeria 1976	Did not participate
Republic of the Congo 1979	Did not participate
Tunisia 1981	Did not participate
Egypt 1983	Did not participate
Angola 1985	Did not participate
Morocco 1987	Did not participate
Algeria 1989	Did not participate
Egypt 1991	Did not participate
Côte d'Ivoire 1992	4th place
Tunisia 1994	Did not qualify
Benin 1996	Did not qualify
South Africa 1998	Did not qualify

Year	Position
Algeria 2000	7th place
Morocco 2002	8th place
Egypt 2004	8th place
Tunisia 2006	11th place
Angola 2008	5th place
Egypt 2010	4th place
Morocco 2012	8th place
Algeria 2014	10th place
Egypt 2016	7th place
Gabon 2018	8th place
Tunisia 2020	7th place
Egypt 2022	7th place
Egypt 2024	6th place
Total	14/26

== Team ==
=== Current squad ===
The squad chosen for the 2021 World Men's Handball Championship in Egypt.

Head coach: Francis Tuzolana

No.	Pos.	Name	Date of birth (age)	Height	App.	Goals	Club
1	GK	Berlin Sobtacdoug	27 January 1977 (age 49)	1.85 m	45	0	(Democratic Republic of the Congo) JS Kinshasa
2	LW	Mara Mukuna	6 October 1993 (age 32)	1.79 m	1	1	(Democratic Republic of the Congo) Heritage Handball
4	P	Christian Yahoza	25 May 1998 (age 27)	1.90 m	1	1	(Angola) Primeiro de Agosto
8	LB	Daniel Mathey	12 September 1993 (age 32)	1.82 m	1	1	(France) Bruges Lormont Handball
9	RB	Zephyrin Bouity	11 December 1999 (age 26)	1.87 m	6	1	(France) Massy Essonne Handball
10	LB	Andre Ngoulou	12 February 1994 (age 32)	1.89 m	1	1	(France) AC Boulogne-Billancourt
11	RB	Adam Ngando	20 March 1986 (age 40)	1.91 m	1	1	(France) Saint-Étienne
12	GK	Junior Lucau	7 April 1987 (age 39)	1.89 m	1	0	(Sweden) Skånela IF
14	CB	Fabrice Ebanga	8 May 1990 (age 35)	1.80 m	9	1	(Democratic Republic of the Congo) JS Kinshasa
15	P	Gauthier Mvumbi	15 May 1994 (age 31)	1.92 m	1	1	(France) Dreux AC
16	GK	Jordy Jacoby	8 February 1995 (age 31)	1.90 m	9	1	(France) Caen HB
17	LW	Johan Kiangebeni	28 August 1995 (age 30)	1.80 m	17	1	(France) CO Vernouillet
18	RW	Baudric Eyanga	1 April 1992 (age 34)	1.83 m	24	1	(Democratic Republic of the Congo) JS Kinshasa
22	LB	Frédéric Beauregard	28 January 1984 (age 42)	1.90 m	6	1	(France) JS Cherbourg Manche Handball
27	LW	Olivier Botetsi	8 May 1990 (age 35)	1.87 m	71	1	(France) AS Saint-Ouen-l'Aumône Handball
55	P	Daniel Morisho	7 February 1996 (age 30)	1.52 m	1	1	(Democratic Republic of the Congo) JS Kinshasa
68	LW	Aurélien Tchitombi	3 August 1993 (age 32)	1.87 m	17	0	(France) Grand Nancy Métropole HB
75	RW	Steeven Corneil	29 December 1995 (age 30)	1.78 m	1	1	(France) Angers SCO
83	LW	Jacques Kinzonzolo	8 July 1993 (age 32)	1.78 m	9	1	(France) Savigny Handball 91
84	CB	Audräy Tuzolana	28 February 1984 (age 42)	1.86 m	1	1	(France) Dreux AC
