= Gabon men's national handball team =

Gabon

Information
- Association: Fédération Gabonaise de Handball
- Coach: Mavoungou Louis; Mgor Michael

Colours
1st	2nd

Results

African Championship
- Appearances: 12 (First in 2000)
- Best result: 5th (2018)
- Last updated on Unknown.

The Gabon national handball team represents the country in the international handball competitions.

== African Nations Championship record ==
Year	Position
Tunisia 1974	Did not participate
Algeria 1976	Did not participate
Republic of the Congo 1979	Did not participate
Tunisia 1981	Did not participate
Egypt 1983	Did not participate
Tunisia 1985	Did not participate
Morocco 1987	Did not participate
Algeria 1989	Did not participate
Egypt 1991	Did not participate
Côte d'Ivoire 1992	Did not participate
Tunisia 1994	Did not participate
Benin 1996	Did not qualify
South Africa 1998	Did not qualify
Algeria 2000	6th place

Year	Position
Morocco 2002	12th place
Egypt 2004	Did not qualify
Tunisia 2006	8th place
Angola 2008	Did not qualify
Egypt 2010	9th place
Morocco 2012	11th place
Algeria 2014	9th place
Egypt 2016	11th place
Gabon 2018	5th place
Tunisia 2020	8th place
Egypt 2022	9th place
Egypt 2024	11th place
Rwanda 2026	9th place
Total	12/27
