= Abdelkrim Bendjemil =

Algerian handball player (born 1959)

Personal information
- Full name: Abdelkrim Bendjemil
- Nationality: Algerian
- Born: 5 December 1959 (age 66) Oran, Algeria
- Height: 1.90 m (6 ft 3 in)

Sport
- Sport: Handball
- Position: Left backcourt, half Left
- Current club: Retired
- Number: 10

Youth career
- Years: Team
- –1976: CRFO-SNS Oran

Senior clubs
- Years: Team
- 1976–1977: (Algeria) CRFO-SNS Oran
- 1977–1987: (Algeria) MC Oran HB
- 1987–1989: (Qatar) Al-Sadd HT
- 1989–1990: (Algeria) MC Oran HB
- 1990–1992: (France) Montpellier AH
- 1992–1998: (France) Toulouse UH
- 1998–1999: (France) CS Marseille PH
National team
Years	Team	Apps	(Gls)
1978–1990	Algeria	150	(115)

Teams managed
- 2010–2014: (Algeria) AS Castors Oran (women)
- 2014–2015: Algeria U17
- 2018–2019: Algeria women
Medal record
African Championship
Gold medal – first place	1981 Tunisia	Team competition
Gold medal – first place	1983 Egypt	Team competition
Gold medal – first place	1985 Tunisia	Team competition
Gold medal – first place	1987 Morocco	Team competition
Gold medal – first place	1989 Algeria	Team competition
African Games
Gold medal – first place	1978 Algiers	Team Competition
Gold medal – first place	1987 Nairobi	Team Competition

Abdelkrim Bendjemil (Arabic: عبد الكريم بن جميل, born 5 December 1959) is a former Algerian handball player.

He played for MC Oran and win many national and international titles. And for the Algerian national team, and participated at the 1980 Summer Olympics, 1984 Summer Olympics and 1988 Summer Olympics, and 2 world championship (1982 and 1986) and win many titles too.

Olympic Games
Preceded by Djamel Yahiouche	Flagbearer for Algeria; 1984 Los Angeles	Succeeded by Noureddine Tadjine
