= Nigeria men's national handball team =

Nigeria National Sports Team

Nigeria

Information
- Association: Handball Federation of Nigeria
- Coach: Rafiu Salami
- Assistant coach: David Emmanuel; Chukwuma Nwankwo

Colours
1st	2nd

Results

World Championship
- Appearances: 1 (First in 1999)
- Best result: 23rd (1999)

African Championship
- Appearances: 16 (First in 1979)
- Best result: 4th (1998)
- Last updated on Unknown.

The Nigeria national handball team is the national team of Nigeria. It takes part in international handball competitions.

The team participated at the 1999 World Men's Handball Championship, where they placed 23rd.

== Results ==
=== World Championship ===
- 1999 – 23rd place

=== African Championship ===
Year	Position
Tunisia 1974	Did not participate
Algeria 1976	Did not participate
Congo 1979	8th place
Tunisia 1981	6th place
Egypt 1983	Did not participate
Tunisia 1985	7th place
Morocco 1987	Did not participate
Algeria 1989	Did not participate
Egypt 1991	Did not participate
Côte d'Ivoire 1992	Did not participate
Tunisia 1994	Did not participate
Benin 1996	5th place
South Africa 1998	4th place
Algeria 2000	Did not qualify

Year	Position
Morocco 2002	7th place
Egypt 2004	Did not qualify
Tunisia 2006	10th place
Angola 2008	6th place
Egypt 2010	7th place
Morocco 2012	Did not qualify
Algeria 2014	11th place
Egygpt 2016	10th place
Gabon 2018	10th place
Tunisia 2020	11th place
Egypt 2022	10th place
Egypt 2024	9th place
Fwanda 2026	6th place
Total	16/27

=== IHF Emerging Nations Championship ===
- 2019 – 7th place
- 2023 – 7th place
- 2025 – 4th place
