= Handball at the 1965 All-Africa Games =

Tournament details
- Host country: Congo
- Venue: 1 (in 1 host city)
- Dates: 16 – 24 July
- Teams: 8

Final positions
- Champions: United Arab Rep. (1st title)
- Runners-up: Ivory Coast
- Third place: Tunisia
- Fourth place: Madagascar

The Handball events at the 1965 All-Africa Games were held in Brazzaville, Republic of the Congo between 16 and 24 July 1965. The competition included only men's event.

== Qualified teams ==
Zone	Team
Hosts	Congo (withdrew)
Zone I	Tunisia
Zone II	Senegal
Zone III	Ivory Coast
Zone IV	Dahomey
Zone V	Cameroon
Zone VI	United Arab Rep.
Zone VII	Madagascar

== Group stage ==
All times are local (UTC+1).

Team advance to the knockout stage

=== Group A ===
Team	Pld	W	D	L	GF	GA	GD	Pts
United Arab Rep.	2	2	0	0	-	-	—	4
Madagascar	3	1	1	1	-	-	—	3
Dahomey	2	0	0	2	-	-	—	0
Congo (W)	0	0	0	0	0	0	0	0

(W) Withdrew

16 July 1965	Madagascar	–	Dahomey	Brazzaville

16 July 1965	United Arab Rep.	–	Madagascar	Brazzaville

... July 1965	United Arab Rep.	27–10	Dahomey	Brazzaville

=== Group B ===
Team	Pld	W	D	L	GF	GA	GD	Pts
Ivory Coast	3	2	1	0	-	-	—	5
Tunisia	3	1	1	1	-	-	—	3
Cameroon	3	1	0	2	-	-	—	2
Senegal	3	1	0	2	-	-	—	2

... July 1965	Ivory Coast	–	Tunisia	Brazzaville

... July 1965	Senegal	–	Cameroon	Brazzaville

... July 1965	Cameroon	13–12	Tunisia	Brazzaville

... July 1965	Ivory Coast	–	Senegal	Brazzaville

... July 1965	Tunisia	10–2	Senegal	Brazzaville

... July 1965	Ivory Coast	15–14	Cameroon	Brazzaville

== Knockout stage ==
Semifinals
.. July – Brazzaville
United Arab Rep.	7
Tunisia	6
.. July – Brazzaville
Ivory Coast	15
Madagascar	14

Final
24 July – Brazzaville
United Arab Rep.	22
Ivory Coast	7
Third place
.. July – Brazzaville
Tunisia	13
Madagascar	10

=== Semifinals ===
... July 1965	United Arab Rep.	7–6	Tunisia	Brazzaville

... July 1965	Ivory Coast	15–14	Madagascar	Brazzaville

=== Third place game ===
... July 1965	Tunisia	13–10	Madagascar	Brazzaville

=== Final ===
24 July 1965	United Arab Rep.	22–7	Ivory Coast	Brazzaville

== Final standing ==
Pos	Team	Pld	W	D	L	Pts
1st	United Arab Rep.	4	4	0	0	8
2nd	Ivory Coast	5	3	1	1	7
3rd	Tunisia	5	2	1	2	5
4	Madagascar	4	1	0	3	2
5	Cameroon	3	1	0	2	2
6	Senegal	3	1	0	2	2
7	Dahomey	2	0	0	2	0
8	Congo (W)	0	0	0	0	0

(W) Withdrew
