= Ouissem Bousnina =

Tunisian handball player

Personal information
- Nationality: Tunisian
- Born: 20 January 1976 (age 50) Mahdia, Tunisia
- Height: 188 cm (74 in)
- Weight: 77 kg (170 lb)

Sport
- Sport: Handball
- Position: Right back

Youth career
- Years: Team
- 1993-1995: EM Mahdia

Senior clubs
- Years: Team
- 1995–2003: EM Mahdia
- 2003–2006: ES Tunis
- 2006–2010: Tremblay-en-France Handball
- 2010–2013: US Ivry Handball
National team
Years	Team	Apps	(Gls)
1997–2014	Tunisia	267	(376)
Medal record
Men's handball
Representing Tunisia
African Championship
Gold medal – first place	2012 Morocco	Team competition
Gold medal – first place	2006 Tunisia	Team competition
Gold medal – first place	2002 Morocco	Team competition
Gold medal – first place	1998 Morocco	Team competition
Silver medal – second place	2004 Egypt	Team competition
Mediterranean Games
Silver medal – second place	2001 Tunis	Team competition

Ouissem Bousnina (arabic: وسام بوسنينة, born 20 January 1976) is a Tunisian handball player. He competed in the men's tournament at the 2000 Summer Olympics.
