= Anouar Ayed =

Tunisian handball player (born 1978)

Personal information
- Full name: Anouar Ayed
- Born: 9 May 1978 (age 48) Moknine, Tunisia
- Height: 1.80 m (5 ft 11 in)

Sport
- Sport: Handball
- Position: Left Wing
- Current club: Étoile du Sahel

Senior clubs
- Years: Team
- ?–?: SC Moknine Handball Team
- ?–2004: Étoile du Sahel
- 2004–2013: Fenix Toulouse Handball
- 2013–2014: Étoile du Sahel
- 2014–2015: Club Africain Handball Team
National team
Years	Team	Apps	(Gls)
2000–2012	Tunisia	285	(621)
Medal record
Men's handball
Representing Tunisia
African Championship
Gold medal – first place	2002 Morocco	Team competition
Gold medal – first place	2006 Tunisia	Team competition
Gold medal – first place	2010 Egypt	Team competition
Gold medal – first place	2012 Morocco	Team competition
Silver medal – second place	2004 Egypt	Team competition
Silver medal – second place	2008 Angola	Team competition
Mediterranean Games
Silver medal – second place	2001 Tunis	Team competition
Bronze medal – third place	2009 Pescara	Team competition
Handball World Cup
Silver medal – second place	2006 Sweden	Team competition

Anouar Ayed (born 9 May 1978) is a Tunisian handball player. He was born in Moknine, Monastir. He has represented Tunisia at two Olympic Games: 2000 Sidney Olympics and the 2012 London Olympics, where the Tunisian team reached the quarter-finals.

== Honours ==
=== National team ===
African Championship

- Winner: 2002 Morocco
- Winner: 2006 Tunisia
- Winner: 2010 Egypt
- Winner: 2012 Morocco

Summer Olympic Games

- Quarter-finalist: 2012 London

World Championship

- Fourth: 2005 Tunisia

Handball World Cup

- Silver Medalist: 2006 Sweden

=== Club ===
Tunisia National League

- (gold) Winner: 1999, 2002, 2003, 2015

Tunisia National Cup

- (gold) Winner: 2000, 2014, 2015

IHF Super Globe

- Fourth: 2013 Qatar

African Champions League

- Winner: 2014 Tunis

African Super Cup

- Winner: 2015 Libreville

Asian Champions League

- Bronze medalist: 2013 Doha

Arab Championship of Champions

- (gold) Winner: 2001 Morocco

Arab Championship of Winners' Cup

- (gold) Winner: 2000
- (gold) Winner: 2001

=== Individual ===
- Historical scorer of the French LNH Division 1 (1204 goals)
- First player to reach 1000 goals in the LNH Division 1
- Highest goal scorer in one match in the LNH Division 1 (17 goals against Saint-Raphaël Var Handball 7 November 2004).
