= Heykel Megannem =

Tunisian handball player

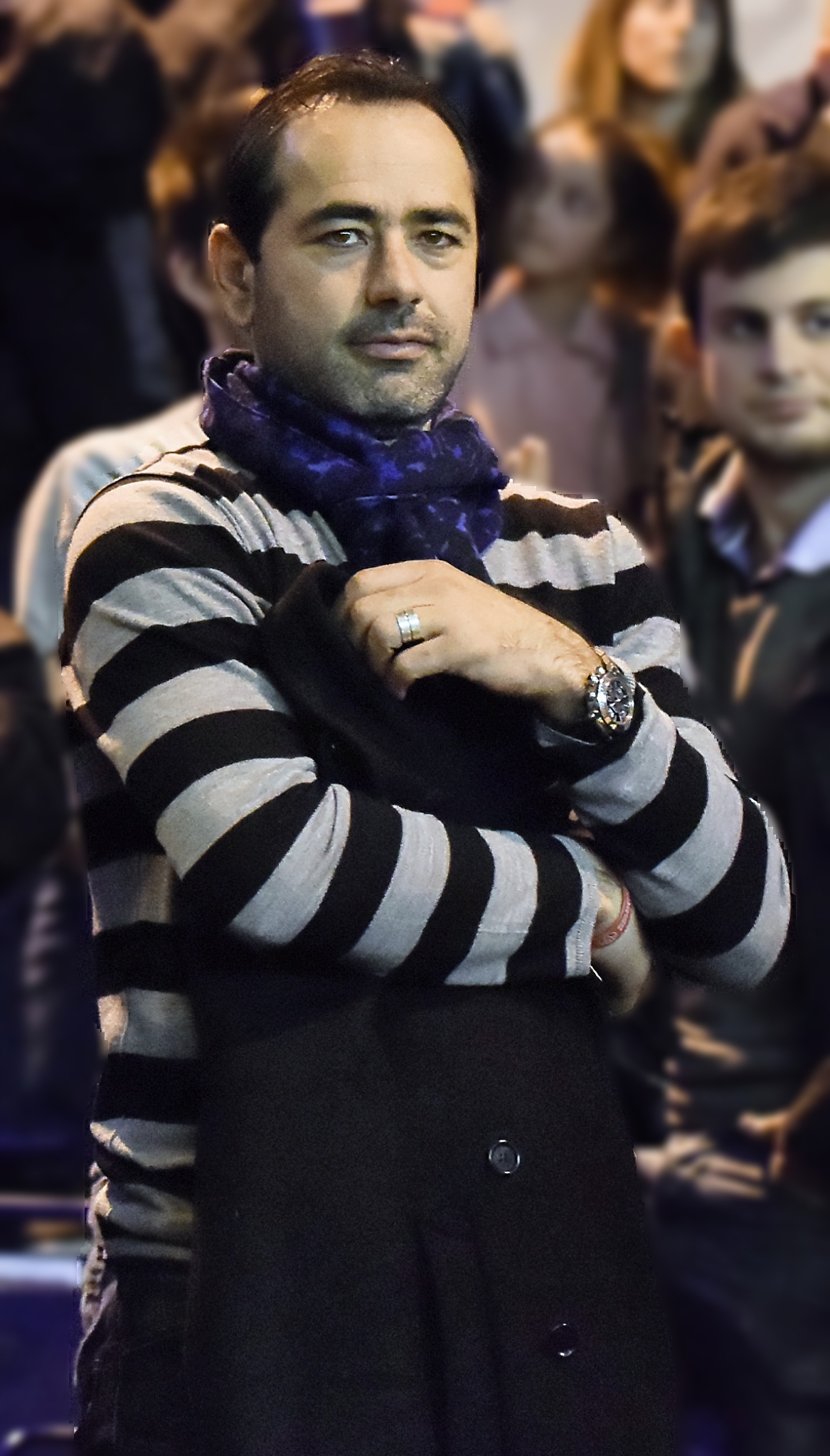

Personal information
- Nationality: Tunisian
- Born: 28 July 1977 (age 49) Moknine, Tunisia
- Height: 1.86 m (6 ft 1 in)

Sport
- Sport: Handball
- Position: Centre back
- Current club: El Jaish

Youth career
- Years: Team
- 1988–1995: SC Moknine

Senior clubs
- Years: Team
- 1995–2002: ES Tunis
- 2002–2005: SC Selestat
- 2005–2007: USAM Nîmes Gard
- 2007–2009: Montpellier Handball
- 2009–2013: Saint-Raphaël Var Handball
- 2013–2014: Lekhwiya Handball Team
- 2014–2015: El Jaish
- 2014–2015: → ES Tunis
National team
Years	Team	Apps	(Gls)
–	Tunisia	276	(615)
Medal record
Men's handball
Representing Tunisia
Mediterranean Games
Silver medal – second place	2001 Tunis	Team competition
African Championship
Gold medal – first place	2002 Morocco
Gold medal – first place	2006 Tunisia
Gold medal – first place	2010 Egypt
Gold medal – first place	2012 Morocco
Silver medal – second place	2004 Egypt
Bronze medal – third place	2000 Algeria

Heykel Megannem (born 28 February 1977) is a Tunisian handball player who competed in the 2012 Summer Olympics tournament where Tunisia lost in the quarterfinals. He was also the flag bearer of the Tunisia sports team at the 2012 Summer Olympics opening ceremony.

== Club Career ==
Megannem started playing handball at SC Moknine in his hometown. At the age of 18 he joined ES Tunis. Here he won the Tunisian Championship three times; in 1995, 1997 and 2002.

In 2002 he moved to France to join SC Selestat. In 2005 he was included in the French League all-star team. The following summer he joined USAM Nîmes Gard. In 2007 he joined Montpellier HB, where he played for 2 years before joining Saint-Raphaël Var Handball. In both seasons with Montpellier he won the French Championship.

In March 2013 he joined Qatari club Lekhwiya. In his first season at the club, he won the national championship. After a year in Qatar he returned to Tunisia, where he rejoined ES Tunis.

== National team ==
Megannem played 272 matches for the Tunisian national team, scoring 612 goals. He won the African Championship 4 times, and was part of the Tunisian team that finished 4th at the 2015 World Championship at home.

Olympic Games
Preceded by Anis Chedli	Flagbearer for Tunisia; London 2012	Succeeded by Oussama Mellouli
