= Alain Portes =

French handball coach (born 1961)

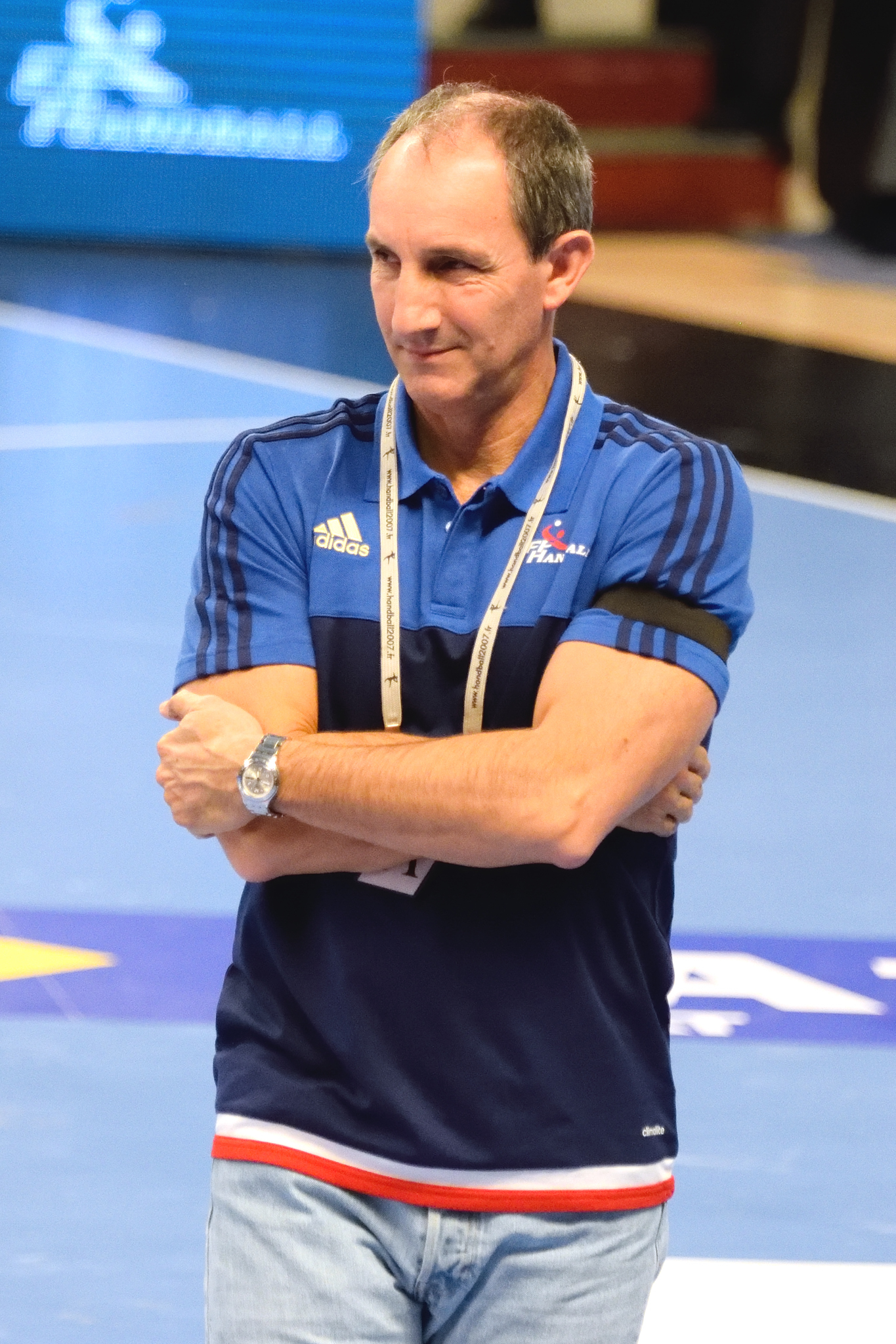
- Portes in 2015

Personal information
- Born: 31 October 1961 (age 65) Béziers, France
- Height: 178 cm (70 in)

Sport
- Sport: Handball
- Position: Left back

Senior clubs
- Years: Team
- 1982–1994: USAM Nîmes
National team
| Years | Team | Apps | (Gls) |
| 1983–1992 | France | 216 | (501) |

Teams managed
- 1995–2004: HBC Nîmes
- 2006–2009: USAM Nîmes
- 2009–2013: Tunisia
- 2013–2016: France (women)
- 2017-2018: GBDH Besançon
- 2018–2019: Al-Duhail SC
- 2019–2021: Algeria
Medal record
Olympic Games
| Bronze medal – third place | 1992 Barcelona | Team |

Alain Portes (born 31 October 1961) is a French handball player and coach, who competed in the 1992 Summer Olympics. He have formerly coached the Tunisian national team, France women's national team and Algerian national team.

== Playing career ==
Son of a former international handball player, he began handball in the club founded by his father before being spotted and recruited from the juniors by USAM Nîmes Gard. He spent his entire career there, winning four French championship titles and three French cups. He stopped his career in 1994 after a final vice-champion title, the club being demoted to the lower division following a bankruptcy.

He had his first experience with the France men's national handball team in 1983 and participated in its long construction under the leadership of Daniel Costantini who led France from the bottom of Group C worldwide in the early 1980s to the top of the world hierarchy. For Alain Portes, this will translate into a bronze medal at the 1992 Olympic Games in Barcelona.

== Coaching career ==
In 1995, he became a coach in the other Nîmes club, the women team of HBC Nîmes, with whom he won the first European title in the history of French women's handball, namely the 2001 EHF Challenge Cup. In 2004, after 9 years at the head of the club, Alain Portes leaves the D1 to supervise the emerging Training Center.

In 2006, he was chosen to take the reins of his former club, USAM Nîmes Gard. He managed to hoist the club in 5th place in 2007 and 2008, the two best results of the club since the title of vice-champion in 1994 in which he participated.

In early June 2009, he signed a three-year contract with the Tunisian men's national team. After three weeks of preparation, he obtained with Tunisia the 3rd place at the Mediterranean Games. In February 2010, he won the African Nations Championship in Cairo by beating the Egyptian team in the final with a score of 24–21. Title which he kept two years later, having Algeria 23–20 in the final of the 2012 edition which allowed him to qualify for the 2012 Olympic games in London. Finally, at the 2012 Olympics, he narrowly lost to Croatia in the quarterfinals. He qualified with the Tunisian team to the round of 16 of the 2013 World Men's Handball Championship in Spain after a good performance by beating the team of Germany 25–23 in the first round.

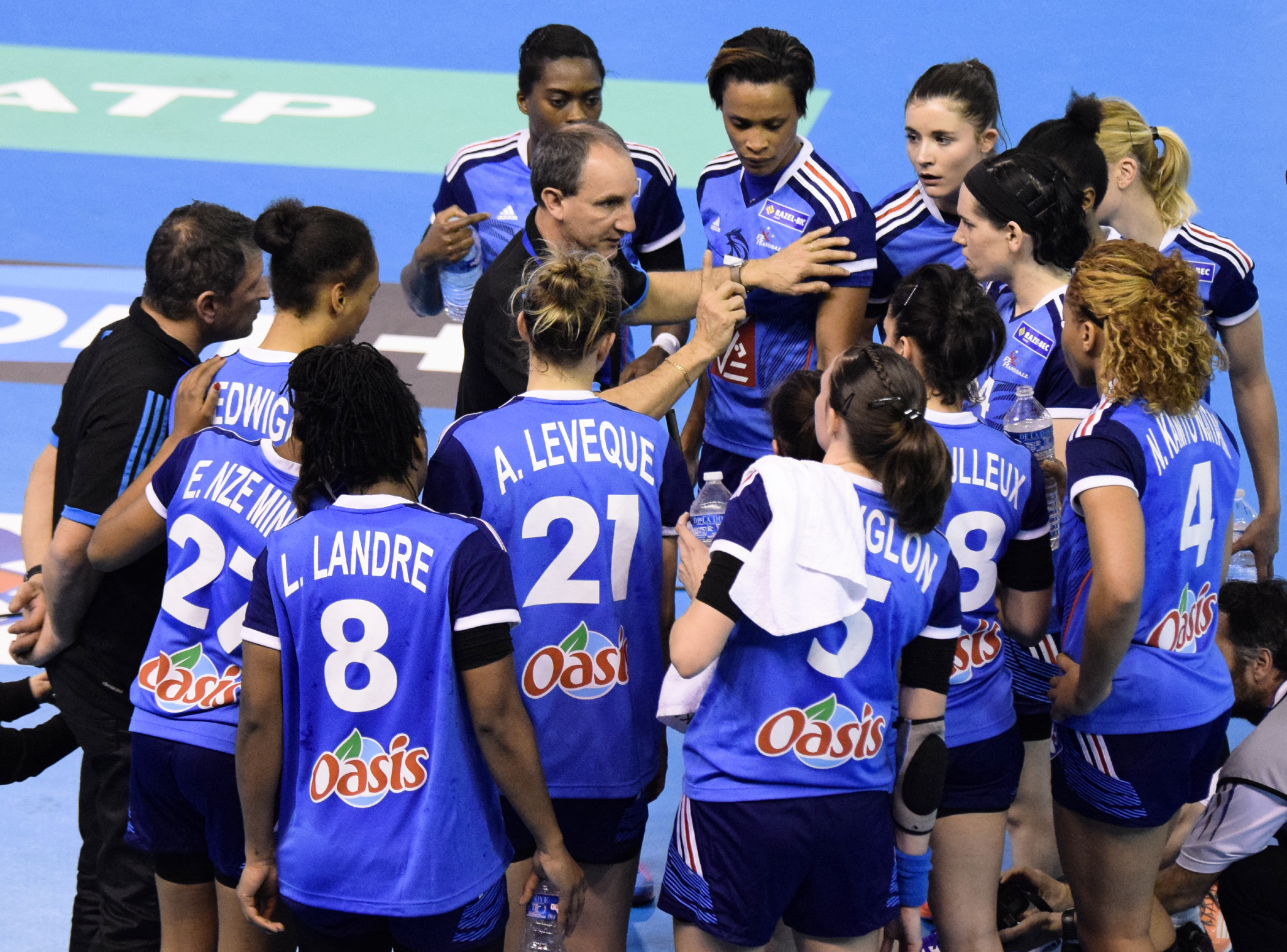
Portes in a time-out in a match of France and Denmark during the 2015 Golden League.

On June 11, 2013, he took over from Olivier Krumbholz at the head of the French women's team. With a team under reconstruction, he made an excellent start to the 2013 World Championship before losing in the quarterfinals against the Polish team. Subsequently, the French women stumble twice at the gates of the semi-final, either at Euro 2014 (5th place) or at the 2015 World Championship (7th place).

In July 2017, he signed a 3-year contract as a coach with the Grand Besançon Doubs Handball. However, he put an end to it at the end of the 2017–2018 season primarily for personal reasons (his family stayed in the Gard) and not because of the poor results of the club.

In December 2018, Alain Portes sets sail for the Arab world by signing until the end of the 2018–2019 season for the Qatari club Al-Duhail SC, defending champion and qualified for the Asian Champions League that he won.

In May 2019, he was named coach of the Algerian national men's team. He managed to qualify for the 2021 world championship after obtaining the bronze medal at the 2020 African championship hosted by Tunisia.

== Player Honours ==
=== National Team Honours ===
- Summer Olympics:
  - Bronze Medal: 1992

=== Club Honours ===
- French League:
  - Winners: 1988, 1990, 1991, 1993
- French Cup:
  - Winners: 1988, 1990, 1991, 1993

== Coach Honours ==
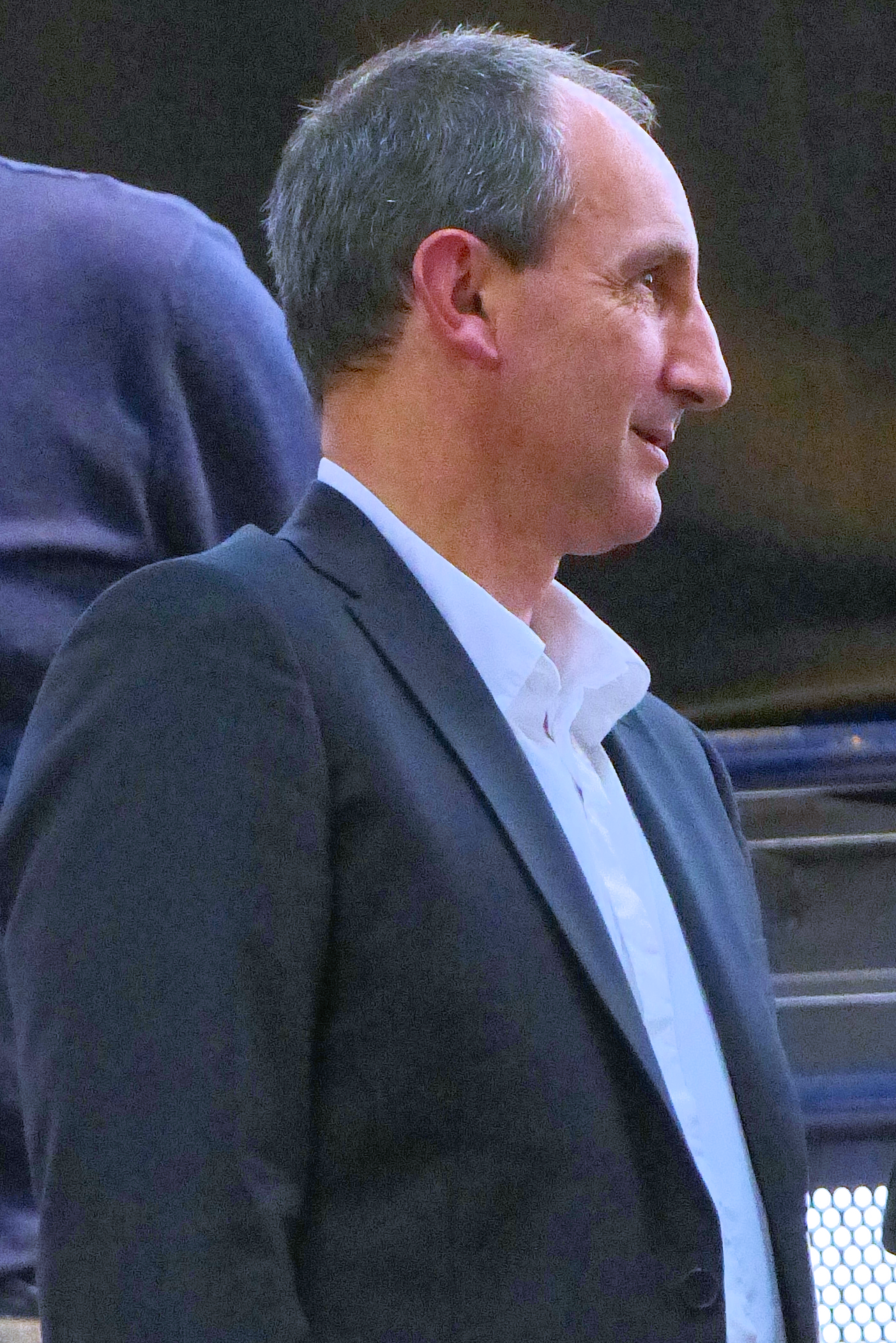
Alain Portes in 2014.

=== National Team Honours ===
- Summer Olympics:
  - Quarter-finals: 2012
- African Men's Handball Championship:
  - Winners: 2010, 2012
  - Third Place: 2020
- World Women's Handball Championship:
  - Quarter-finals: 2013, 2015

=== Club Honours ===
- Women's EHF Challenge Cup:
  - Winners: 2001
- Asian Champions League:
  - Winners: 2018

== Individual honours ==
- Elected in 2002 the best French left winger of all time by the FFHB
- Selected in the "Europe team" in January 1993
