= Senegal men's national handball team =

Senegal

Information
- Association: Fédération Sénégalaise de Handball

Colours
1st	2nd

Results

African Championship
- Appearances: 9 (First in 1974)
- Best result: (bronze) 3rd (1974)
- Last updated on Unknown.

The Senegal national handball team is the national handball team of the Senegal.

== African Championship record ==
Year	Position
Tunisia 1974	3rd
Algeria 1976	5th
Congo 1979	did not participate
Tunisia 1981	did not participate
Egypt 1983	did not participate
Tunisia 1985	9th
Morocco 1987	7th
Algeria 1989	did not participate
Egypt 1991	6th
Côte d'Ivoire 1992	6th
Tunisia 1994	9th
Benin 1996	did not participate

Year	Position
South Africa 1998	did not participate
Algeria 2000	did not participate
Morocco 2002	9th
Egypt 2004	7th
Tunisia 2006	did not participate
Angola 2008	did not participate
Egypt 2010	did not participate
Morocco 2012	5th
Algeria 2014	8th
Egypt 2016	did not participate
Gabon 2018	did not participate
Tunisia 2020	Withdrawn
Egypt 2022	11th
Total	12/25
