= 2006 African Men's Handball Championship =

2006 African Men's Championship
Tournament details
- Host country: Tunisia
- Venue(s): 3 (in 3 host cities)
- Dates: 10–20 January
- Teams: 11 (from 1 confederation)

Final positions
- Champions: Tunisia (7th title)
- Runner-up: Egypt
- Third place: Morocco
- Fourth place: Angola

Tournament statistics
- Matches played: 45
- Goals scored: 2,416 (53.69 per match)

The 2006 African Men's Handball Championship was the 17th edition of the African Men's Handball Championship, held in Tunis and Radès, Tunisia, from 10 to 20 January 2006. It acted as the African qualifying tournament for the 2007 World Championship in Germany.

Tunisia win their seventh title beating Egypt in the final game 26–21.

== Qualified teams ==
- Algeria
- Angola
- Cameroon
- Congo
- DR Congo
- Egypt
- Gabon
- Ivory Coast
- Morocco
- Nigeria
- Senegal (withdrew)
- Tunisia (hosts)

== Venues ==
Radès	Tunis
Hall 7th Novembre	El Menzah Sports Palace
Capacity: 14,000	Capacity: 5,500
Ariana	2006 African Men's Handball Championship is located in Tunisia
Ariana Indoor Sports Hall	2006 African Men's Handball Championship is located in Tunisia
Capacity: 2,000	2006 African Men's Handball Championship is located in Tunisia

== First round ==
All times are local (UTC+1).

Team advance to the second round

=== Group A ===
Team	Pld	W	D	L	GF	GA	GD	Pts
Egypt	1	1	0	0	36	18	+18	2
Gabon	1	0	0	1	18	36	−18	0
Senegal (W)	0	0	0	0	0	0	0	0

(W) Withdrew

10 January 2006; 18:30	Egypt	36–18	Gabon	El Menzah Sports Palace, Tunis
10 January 2006; 18:30		(18–9)		El Menzah Sports Palace, Tunis

=== Group B ===
Team	Pld	W	D	L	GF	GA	GD	Pts
Tunisia (H)	2	2	0	0	82	43	+39	4
Ivory Coast	2	1	0	1	30	40	−10	2
Cameroon	2	0	0	2	23	52	−29	0

(H) Hosts

10 January 2006; 18:30	Tunisia	40–20	Ivory Coast	Hall 7th Novembre, Radès
10 January 2006; 18:30		(19–7)		Hall 7th Novembre, Radès

11 January 2006; 18:30	Ivory Coast	10–0	Cameroon	Hall 7th Novembre, Radès
11 January 2006; 18:30		(cancelled)		Hall 7th Novembre, Radès

12 January 2006; 18:30	Tunisia	42–23	Cameroon	Hall 7th Novembre, Radès
12 January 2006; 18:30		(25–11)		Hall 7th Novembre, Radès

=== Group C ===
Team	Pld	W	D	L	GF	GA	GD	Pts
Angola	2	2	0	0	64	53	+11	4
Congo	2	1	0	1	49	48	+1	2
DR Congo	2	0	0	2	51	63	−12	0

10 January 2006; 18:30	Angola	27–23	Congo	Ariana Indoor Sports Hall, Ariana
10 January 2006; 18:30		(12–9)		Ariana Indoor Sports Hall, Ariana

11 January 2006; 18:30	Congo	26–21	DR Congo	Ariana Indoor Sports Hall, Ariana
11 January 2006; 18:30		(12–7)		Ariana Indoor Sports Hall, Ariana

12 January 2006; 18:30	Angola	37–31	DR Congo	Ariana Indoor Sports Hall, Ariana
12 January 2006; 18:30		(15–10)		Ariana Indoor Sports Hall, Ariana

=== Group D ===
Team	Pld	W	D	L	GF	GA	GD	Pts
Morocco	2	2	0	0	72	60	+12	4
Algeria	2	1	0	1	40	31	+9	2
Nigeria	2	0	0	2	30	51	−21	0

10 January 2006; 16:30	Algeria	10–0	Nigeria	El Menzah Sports Palace, Tunis
10 January 2006; 16:30		(cancelled)		El Menzah Sports Palace, Tunis

11 January 2006; 18:30	Morocco	41–30	Nigeria	El Menzah Sports Palace, Tunis
11 January 2006; 18:30		(18–15)		El Menzah Sports Palace, Tunis

12 January 2006; 18:30	Morocco	31–30	Algeria	El Menzah Sports Palace, Tunis
12 January 2006; 18:30		(17–13)		El Menzah Sports Palace, Tunis

== Second round ==
Team advance to the knockout stage

=== Group E ===
Team	Pld	W	D	L	GF	GA	GD	Pts
Egypt	3	3	0	0	95	62	+33	6
Angola	3	2	0	1	84	82	+2	4
Algeria	3	1	0	2	83	78	+5	2
Ivory Coast	3	0	0	3	69	109	−40	0

14 January 2006; 16:30	Angola	34–26	Ivory Coast	El Menzah Sports Palace, Tunis
14 January 2006; 16:30		(16–10)		El Menzah Sports Palace, Tunis

14 January 2006; 18:30	Egypt	26–21	Algeria	El Menzah Sports Palace, Tunis
14 January 2006; 18:30		(12–7)		El Menzah Sports Palace, Tunis

15 January 2006; 16:30	Algeria	27–28	Angola	El Menzah Sports Palace, Tunis
15 January 2006; 16:30		(13–13)		El Menzah Sports Palace, Tunis

15 January 2006; 18:30	Egypt	40–19	Ivory Coast	El Menzah Sports Palace, Tunis
15 January 2006; 18:30		(23–7)		El Menzah Sports Palace, Tunis

16 January 2006; 16:30	Algeria	35–24	Ivory Coast	El Menzah Sports Palace, Tunis
16 January 2006; 16:30		(20–14)		El Menzah Sports Palace, Tunis

16 January 2006; 18:30	Egypt	29–22	Angola	El Menzah Sports Palace, Tunis
16 January 2006; 18:30		(15–12)		El Menzah Sports Palace, Tunis

=== Group F ===
Team	Pld	W	D	L	GF	GA	GD	Pts
Tunisia (H)	3	3	0	0	137	64	+73	6
Morocco	3	2	0	1	92	91	+1	4
Congo	3	1	0	2	80	99	−19	2
Gabon	3	0	0	3	57	112	−55	0

(H) Hosts

14 January 2006; 16:30	Tunisia	45–22	Congo	Hall 7th Novembre, Radès
14 January 2006; 16:30		(27–10)		Hall 7th Novembre, Radès

14 January 2006; 18:30	Morocco	37–19	Gabon	Hall 7th Novembre, Radès
14 January 2006; 18:30		(17–5)		Hall 7th Novembre, Radès

15 January 2006; 16:30	Morocco	32–28	Congo	Hall 7th Novembre, Radès
15 January 2006; 16:30		(17–11)		Hall 7th Novembre, Radès

15 January 2006; 18:30	Tunisia	48–16	Gabon	Hall 7th Novembre, Radès
15 January 2006; 18:30		(26–8)		Hall 7th Novembre, Radès

16 January 2006; 16:30	Congo	30–22	Gabon	Hall 7th Novembre, Radès
16 January 2006; 16:30		(16–9)		Hall 7th Novembre, Radès

16 January 2006; 18:30	Tunisia	44–26	Morocco	Hall 7th Novembre, Radès
16 January 2006; 18:30		(23–12)		Hall 7th Novembre, Radès

== Placement matches ==
=== Group 9–11th place ===
Team took ninth place
Team took tenth place
Team took eleventh place

Team	Pld	W	D	L	GF	GA	GD	Pts
Cameroon	2	1	0	1	55	49	+6	2
Nigeria	2	1	0	1	54	57	−3	2
DR Congo	2	1	0	1	49	52	−3	2

14 January 2006; 20:30	DR Congo	25–22	Cameroon	Ariana Indoor Sports Hall, Ariana
14 January 2006; 20:30		(11–11)		Ariana Indoor Sports Hall, Ariana

15 January 2006; 14:30	Nigeria	30–24	DR Congo	El Menzah Sports Palace, Tunis
15 January 2006; 14:30		(14–13)		El Menzah Sports Palace, Tunis

17 January 2006; 14:30	Cameroon	33–24	Nigeria	El Menzah Sports Palace, Tunis
17 January 2006; 14:30		(20–8)		El Menzah Sports Palace, Tunis

=== Seventh place match ===
18 January 2006; 10:00	Ivory Coast	29–25	Gabon	Ariana Indoor Sports Hall, Ariana
18 January 2006; 10:00		(13–13)		Ariana Indoor Sports Hall, Ariana

=== Fifth place match ===
18 January 2006; 12:00	Algeria	36–31	Congo	Ariana Indoor Sports Hall, Ariana
18 January 2006; 12:00		(20–16)		Ariana Indoor Sports Hall, Ariana

== Knockout stage ==
Semifinals
18 January – Radès
Tunisia	36
Angola	21
18 January – Tunis
Egypt	32
Morocco	23

Final
20 January – Radès
Tunisia	26
Egypt	21
Third place
19 January – Tunis
Angola	25
Morocco	26

=== Semifinals ===
18 January 2006; 18:30	Tunisia	36–21	Angola	Hall 7th Novembre, Radès
18 January 2006; 18:30		(19–8)		Hall 7th Novembre, Radès

18 January 2006; 18:30	Egypt	32–23	Morocco	Hall 7th Novembre, Radès
18 January 2006; 18:30		(16–12)		Hall 7th Novembre, Radès

=== Third place game ===
19 January 2006; 18:30	Morocco	26–25	Angola	El Menzah Sports Palace, Tunis
19 January 2006; 18:30		(12–15)		El Menzah Sports Palace, Tunis

=== Final ===
20 January 2006; 20:30	Tunisia	26–21	Egypt	Hall 7th Novembre, Radès
20 January 2006; 20:30	Wissem Hmam 9	(13–10)	Ahmed El-Ahmar 6	Hall 7th Novembre, Radès
20 January 2006; 20:30		report		Hall 7th Novembre, Radès

- Tunisia: Wissem Hmam 9, Heykel Megannem 6, Wissem Bousnina 3, Marouen Belhadj 3, Sabhi Ben Aziza 2, Issam Tej 1, Anouar Ayed 1, Mahmoud Gharbi 1
- Egypt: Ahmed El-Ahmar 6, Sayed 3, Mohamed Keshk 4, Awad 3, Hassan Yousry 1, Abdelfarès 2, Alam 2.

== Final ranking ==
Qualified for the 2007 World Championship

Rank	Team
Gold medal	Tunisia
Silver medal	Egypt
Bronze medal	Morocco
4	Angola
5	Algeria
6	Congo
7	Ivory Coast
8	Gabon
9	Cameroon
10	Nigeria
11	DR Congo
