= Tunisia men's national handball team =

Handball team representing Tunisia

Tunisia

Information
- Nickname: نسور قرطاج (Eagles of Carthage)
- Association: Tunisian Handball Federation
- Coach: Thierry Anti
- Assistant coach: Mohamed Boughzala
- Most caps: Issam Tej (316)
- Most goals: Oussama Boughanmi (865)

Colours
| 1st | 2nd |

Results

Summer Olympics
- Appearances: 4 (First in 1972)
- Best result: 8th (2012)

World Championship
- Appearances: 17 (First in 1967)
- Best result: 4th (2005)

African Championship
- Appearances: 27 (First in 1974)
- Best result: (gold) 1st (1974, 1976, 1979, 1994, 1998, 2002, 2006, 2010, 2012, 2018)
- Last updated on Unknown.

Tunisia men's national handball team
Medal record

Representing Tunisia

Handball

African Championship
| Gold medal – first place | 1974 Tunisia | |
| Gold medal – first place | 1976 Algeria | |
| Gold medal – first place | 1979 Congo | |
| Gold medal – first place | 1994 Tunisia | |
| Gold medal – first place | 1998 South Africa | |
| Gold medal – first place | 2002 Morocco | |
| Gold medal – first place | 2006 Tunisia | |
| Gold medal – first place | 2010 Egypt | |
| Gold medal – first place | 2012 Morocco | |
| Gold medal – first place | 2018 Gabon | |
| Silver medal – second place | 1985 Angola | |
| Silver medal – second place | 1992 Ivory Coast | |
| Silver medal – second place | 1996 Benin | |
| Silver medal – second place | 2004 Egypt | |
| Silver medal – second place | 2008 Angola | |
| Silver medal – second place | 2014 Algeria | |
| Silver medal – second place | 2016 Egypt | |
| Silver medal – second place | 2020 Tunisia | |
| Silver medal – second place | 2026 Rwanda | |
| Bronze medal – third place | 1981 Tunisia | |
| Bronze medal – third place | 1983 Egypt | |
| Bronze medal – third place | 1987 Morocco | |
| Bronze medal – third place | 1989 Algeria | |
| Bronze medal – third place | 1991 Egypt | |
| Bronze medal – third place | 2000 Algeria | |
| Bronze medal – third place | 2024 Egypt | |

African Games
| Silver medal – second place | 1978 Algiers | Team |
| Bronze medal – third place | 1965 Brazzaville | Team |
| Bronze medal – third place | 2007 Algiers | Team |

Mediterranean Games
| Silver medal – second place | 2001 Tunis | Team |
| Silver medal – second place | 2018 Tarragona | Team |
| Bronze medal – third place | 1967 Tunis | Team |
| Bronze medal – third place | 1979 Split | Team |
| Bronze medal – third place | 2005 Almería | Team |
| Bronze medal – third place | 2009 Pescara | Team |

Pan Arab Games
| Gold medal – first place | 1985 Rabat | Team |
| Bronze medal – third place | 1992 Damascus | Team |
| Bronze medal – third place | 2011 Doha | Team |

The Tunisia men's national handball team (Arabic: منتخب تونس لكرة اليد), nicknamed Eagles of Carthage, is the national handball team of Tunisia. It is controlled by the Tunisian Handball Federation (THF) and takes part in international handball competitions. The Tunisian Handball League was created in 1953. In 1957, the Tunisian Handball Federation was founded and then admitted to the International Handball Federation in 1962.

The Tunisian national team participates in several world championships. In 2005 World Championship, Tunisia finished fourth, becoming the second non-European team to reach the semi-finals of the world championship after Egypt, which reached the semi-finals in 2001. The Tunisian team won the African Championship for a record ten titles (1974, 1976, 1979, 1994, 1998, 2002, 2006, 2010, 2012, 2018. Egypt and Algeria are Tunisia's main rivals on the African continent. Following the 2026 African Championship, Egypt tied Tunisia's record of ten continental titles.

The national team is mainly and generally composed of players from Espérance Sportive de Tunis, Club Africain and Étoile Sportive du Sahel, these teams being the traditional locomotives of the national handball scene, as well as players playing in Europe, mainly in France.

== History ==
Tunisia is the most successful team in the African Nations Championship with ten titles won in 1974, 1976, 1979, 1994, 1998, 2002, 2006, 2010, 2012 and 2018, and played in the final eight times in 1985, 1992, 1996, 2004, 2008, 2014, 2016 and 2020. They also won a bronze medal six times in 1981, 1983, 1987, 1989, 1991 and 2000.

At the World Championships, in 2005 it obtained the best performance obtained by an African country, a fourth place, thus equaling Egypt (place obtained in 2001). During the 2005–06 season, Heykel Megannem was voted the best player in the French championship, with Wissem Hmam and Issam Tej also being in the standard team, respectively as left-back and pivot.

Following the 2009 world championship, the federation sidelined Issam Tej for "indiscipline, insolence and recidivism" and Makram Missaoui for "having refused to resume play against Poland", while Maher Kraiem was suspended for three months for “misconduct”. The team is coached by the Croatian Sead Hasanefendić until June 2008, before being replaced by the Serb Zoran Živković from 24 October 2008. However, the federation dismisses him following the poor performance of the team during the 2009 world championship. He was replaced by the Tunisian Sayed Ayari and then, in June 2009, by the Frenchman Alain Portes, who signed a three-year contract.

In 2013, Alain Portes' contract was not being renewed, so he took over from Olivier Krumbholz at the head of the French women's team and was replaced by Sead Hasanefendić, back at the head of the national team for the following three seasons. In 2020, coach Toni Gerona was dismissed.

== Infrastructure ==
The El Menzah Sports Palace, built in 1967, is the hall of the national team. Built for the 2005 World Men's Handball Championship, of which it hosted the final and all of Tunisia's matches, the Salle Omnisport de Radès now hosted most of the national team's matches.

== Honours ==
=== Official competitions ===
African Nations Championship

- (gold) Champions (10): 1974, 1976, 1979, 1994, 1998, 2002, 2006, 2010, 2012, 2018
- (silver) Runners-up: 1985, 1992, 1996, 2004, 2008, 2014, 2016, 2020, 2026
- (bronze) Third Place: 1981, 1983, 1987, 1989, 1991, 2000, 2024

African Games

- (silver) Runners-up: 1978
- (bronze) Third Place: 1965, 2007

Mediterranean Games

- (silver) Runners-up: 2001, 2018
- (bronze) Third Place: 1967, 1979, 2005, 2009

Pan Arab Games

- (gold) Champions: 1985
- (bronze) Third Place: 1992, 2011

=== Minor tournaments ===
World cup

- (silver) Runners-up: 2006

Yellow Cup

- (gold) Champions: 2007, 2015, 2016, 2019
- (silver) Runners-up: 2002, 2003, 2004, 2020
- (bronze) Third Place: 2008, 2010

Paris Ile-de-France tournament

- (gold) Champions: 2005
- (bronze) Third Place: 1998, 2002, 2007, 2013

Championnat maghrébin des nations

- (gold) Champions : 1969, 1971, 1973

Tunisia international tournament

- (gold) Champions: 2015, 2017, 2021

Four Nations Cup Poland

- (gold) Champions: 2021, 2022

Three Nations Cup Tunisia

- (gold) Champions: 2023

Challenge Marrane

- (gold) Champions: 2008

Four Nations Tournament

- (silver) Runners-up: 2015

Air Caraïbes Cup

- (silver) Runners-up: 2019

Spain international tournament

- (bronze) Third Place: 1999, 2002, 2012

== Competitive record ==
Champions Runners-up Third place Fourth place

- Red border color indicates tournament was held on home soil.

=== Olympic Games ===
Olympic Games
| Games | Round | Position | Pld | W | D | L | GF | GA | GD |
|---|---|---|---|---|---|---|---|---|---|
| (Germany) 1936 | Part of France | | | | | | | | |
Not held from 1948 to 1968
| (West Germany) 1972 | Match for 15th place | 16th | 5 | 0 | 0 | 5 | 72 | 118 | −46 |
| (Canada) 1976 | Withdrawn after two games | | | | | | | | |
| (Soviet Union) 1980 | Did not qualify | | | | | | | | |
| (United States) 1984 | Did not qualify | | | | | | | | |
| (South Korea) 1988 | Did not qualify | | | | | | | | |
| (Spain) 1992 | Did not qualify | | | | | | | | |
| (United States) 1996 | Did not qualify | | | | | | | | |
| (Australia) 2000 | Match for 9th place | 10th | 6 | 1 | 0 | 5 | 130 | 141 | −11 |
| (Greece) 2004 | Did not qualify | | | | | | | | |
| (China) 2008 | Did not qualify | | | | | | | | |
| (United Kingdom) 2012 | Quarter-finals | 8th | 6 | 2 | 0 | 4 | 144 | 150 | −6 |
| (Brazil) 2016 | Group stage | 12th | 5 | 0 | 1 | 4 | 118 | 145 | −27 |
| (Japan) 2020 | Did not qualify | | | | | | | | |
| (France) 2024 | Did not qualify | | | | | | | | |
| Total | 4/15 | 0 Titles | 22 | 3 | 1 | 18 | 464 | 554 | −90 |

=== World Championship ===
World Championships
| Games | Round | Position | Pld | W | D | L | GF | GA | GD |
|---|---|---|---|---|---|---|---|---|---|
| (Germany) 1938 | Part of France | | | | | | | | |
| (Sweden) 1954 | Part of France | | | | | | | | |
| (West Germany) 1958 | Did not enter | | | | | | | | |
| (West Germany) 1961 | Did not enter | | | | | | | | |
| (Czechoslovakia) 1964 | Did not enter | | | | | | | | |
| (Sweden) 1967 | Group stage | 15th | 3 | 0 | 0 | 3 | 23 | 66 | −43 |
| (France) 1970 | Did not enter | | | | | | | | |
| (East Germany) 1974 | Did not enter | | | | | | | | |
| (Denmark) 1978 | Did not enter | | | | | | | | |
| (West Germany) 1982 | Did not enter | | | | | | | | |
| (East Germany) 1986 | Did not enter | | | | | | | | |
| (Czechoslovakia) 1990 | Did not enter | | | | | | | | |
| (Sweden) 1993 | Did not enter | | | | | | | | |
| (Iceland) 1995 | Round of 16 | 15th | 7 | 2 | 0 | 5 | 160 | 183 | −23 |
| (Japan) 1997 | Round of 16 | 16th | 6 | 2 | 0 | 4 | 106 | 128 | −22 |
| (Egypt) 1999 | Round of 16 | 12th | 6 | 2 | 1 | 3 | 133 | 142 | −9 |
| (France) 2001 | Round of 16 | 10th | 6 | 3 | 0 | 3 | 140 | 136 | +4 |
| (Portugal) 2003 | Second round | 14th | 7 | 2 | 0 | 5 | 178 | 186 | −8 |
| (Tunisia) 2005 | Fourth place | 4th | 10 | 5 | 3 | 2 | 311 | 252 | +59 |
| (Germany) 2007 | Main round | 11th | 8 | 3 | 0 | 5 | 237 | 237 | 0 |
| (Croatia) 2009 | Group stage | 17th | 9 | 5 | 0 | 4 | 264 | 250 | +14 |
| (Sweden) 2011 | Group stage | 20th | 7 | 1 | 0 | 6 | 168 | 193 | −25 |
| (Spain) 2013 | Round of 16 | 11th | 6 | 3 | 0 | 3 | 146 | 153 | −7 |
| (Qatar) 2015 | Round of 16 | 15th | 6 | 2 | 1 | 3 | 152 | 161 | −9 |
| (France) 2017 | Group stage | 19th | 7 | 2 | 2 | 3 | 209 | 202 | +7 |
| (Denmark) (Germany) 2019 | Main round | 12th | 8 | 3 | 0 | 5 | 205 | 238 | −33 |
| (Egypt) 2021 | Presidents Cup | 25th | 7 | 4 | 1 | 2 | 209 | 182 | +27 |
| (Poland) (Sweden) 2023 | Presidents Cup | 25th | 7 | 4 | 1 | 2 | 208 | 196 | +12 |
| (Croatia) (Denmark) (Norway) 2025 | Main round | 22nd | 6 | 1 | 0 | 5 | 143 | 189 | −46 |
| (Germany) 2027 | Qualified | | | | | | | | |
| (France) (Germany) 2029 | To be determined | | | | | | | | |
| (Denmark) (Iceland) (Norway) 2031 | To be determined | | | | | | | | |
| Total | Fourth place | 18/21 | 116 | 44 | 9 | 63 | 2992 | 3094 | −102 |

- Tunisia did not compete From 1938 to 1964 and 1970 to 1993.
- Red border color indicates tournament was held on home :soil.

=== African Championship ===
African Championship
| Year | Round | Position | Pld | W | D | L |
|---|---|---|---|---|---|---|
| (Tunisia) 1974 | Champions | 1st | 3 | 3 | 0 | 0 |
| (Algeria) 1976 | Champions | 1st | 4 | 4 | 0 | 0 |
| (Republic of the Congo) 1979 | Champions | 1st | 5 | 5 | 0 | 0 |
| (Tunisia) 1981 | Third place | 3rd | 3 | 2 | 1 | 0 |
| (Egypt) 1983 | Third place | 3rd | 6 | 4 | 0 | 2 |
| (Angola) 1985 | Runners-up | 2nd | 5 | 3 | 0 | 2 |
| (Morocco) 1987 | Third place | 3rd | 5 | 3 | 0 | 2 |
| (Algeria) 1989 | Third place | 3rd | 5 | 3 | 0 | 2 |
| (Egypt) 1991 | Third place | 3rd | 6 | 3 | 1 | 2 |
| (Ivory Coast) 1992 | Runners-up | 2nd | 5 | 3 | 1 | 1 |
| (Tunisia) 1994 | Champions | 1st | 6 | 6 | 0 | 0 |
| (Benin) 1996 | Runners-up | 2nd | 6 | 5 | 0 | 1 |
| (South Africa) 1998 | Champions | 1st | 6 | 5 | 0 | 1 |
| (Algeria) 2000 | Third place | 3rd | 6 | 3 | 1 | 2 |
| (Morocco) 2002 | Champions | 1st | 5 | 5 | 0 | 0 |
| (Egypt) 2004 | Runners-up | 2nd | 7 | 6 | 0 | 1 |
| (Tunisia) 2006 | Champions | 1st | 7 | 7 | 0 | 0 |
| (Angola) 2008 | Runners-up | 2nd | 5 | 4 | 0 | 1 |
| (Egypt) 2010 | Champions | 1st | 8 | 8 | 0 | 0 |
| (Morocco) 2012 | Champions | 1st | 8 | 8 | 0 | 0 |
| (Algeria) 2014 | Runners-up | 2nd | 8 | 7 | 0 | 1 |
| (Egypt) 2016 | Runners-up | 2nd | 8 | 7 | 0 | 1 |
| (Gabon) 2018 | Champions | 1st | 7 | 6 | 1 | 0 |
| (Tunisia) 2020 | Runners-up | 2nd | 7 | 6 | 0 | 1 |
| (Egypt) 2022 | Fourth place | 4th | 5 | 3 | 0 | 2 |
| (Egypt) 2024 | Third place | 3rd | 6 | 5 | 0 | 1 |
| (Rwanda) 2026 | Runners-up | 2nd | 7 | 5 | 1 | 1 |
| Total | Champions | 27/27 | 159 | 129 | 6 | 24 |

=== African Games ===
African Games
| Year | Round | Position | Pld | W | D | L |
|---|---|---|---|---|---|---|
| (Republic of the Congo) 1965 | Third place | 3rd | 5 | 2 | 1 | 2 |
| (Nigeria) 1973 | Did not participate | | | | | |
| (Algeria) 1978 | Runners-up | 2nd | 5 | 4 | 0 | 1 |
| (Kenya) 1987 | Did not participate | | | | | |
| (Egypt) 1991 | Did not participate | | | | | |
| (Zimbabwe) 1995 | Withdrew | | | | | |
| (South Africa) 1999 | Did not participate | | | | | |
| (Nigeria) 2003 | Did not participate | | | | | |
| (Algeria) 2007 | Third place | 3rd | 4 | 2 | 0 | 2 |
| (Mozambique) 2011 | Did not participate | | | | | |
| (Republic of the Congo) 2015 | Did not participate | | | | | |
| (Morocco) 2019 | Did not participate | | | | | |
| Total | Runners-up | 3/12 | 14 | 8 | 1 | 5 |

=== Mediterranean Games ===
Mediterranean Games
| Year | Round | Position | Pld | W | D | L |
|---|---|---|---|---|---|---|
| (Tunisia) 1967 | Third place | 3rd | 3 | 1 | 0 | 2 |
| (Turkey) 1971 | Tournament canceled | | | | | |
| (Algeria) 1975 | Fourth place | 4th | 4 | 1 | 0 | 3 |
| (Socialist Federal Republic of Yugoslavia) 1979 | Third place | 3rd | 4 | 2 | 0 | 2 |
| (Morocco) 1983 | Fourth place | 4th | | | | |
| (Syria) 1987 | Did not participate | | | | | |
| (Greece) 1991 | Did not participate | | | | | |
| (France) 1993 | Did not participate | | | | | |
| (Italy) 1997 | Eighth place | 8th | 5 | 1 | 0 | 4 |
| (Tunisia) 2001 | Runners-up | 2nd | 5 | 4 | 0 | 1 |
| (Spain) 2005 | Third place | 3rd | 5 | 4 | 0 | 1 |
| (Italy) 2009 | Third place | 3rd | 6 | 4 | 0 | 2 |
| (Turkey) 2013 | Group stage | 7th | 5 | 2 | 1 | 2 |
| (Spain) 2018 | Runners-up | 2nd | 5 | 4 | 0 | 1 |
| (Algeria) 2022 | Fifth Place | 5th | 5 | 3 | 0 | 2 |
| Total | Runners-up | 11/14 | | | | |

=== Pan Arab Games ===
Arab Games
| Year | Round | Position | Pld | W | D | L |
|---|---|---|---|---|---|---|
| (Morocco) 1961 | Did not participate | | | | | |
| (United Arab Republic) 1965 | Did not participate | | | | | |
| (Syria) 1976 | Did not participate | | | | | |
| (Morocco) 1985 | Champions | 1st | | | | |
| (Syria) 1992 | Third place | 3rd | | | | |
| (Lebanon) 1997 | Tournament canceled | | | | | |
| (Jordan) 1999 | Did not participate | | | | | |
| (Algeria) 2004 | Tournament canceled | | | | | |
| (Egypt) 2007 | Did not participate | | | | | |
| (Qatar) 2011 | Third place | 3rd | | | | |
| Total | Champions | 3/10 | | | | |

=== Other records ===
Other records
| Year | Round | Position |
|---|---|---|
| 1969 Maghreb Nations Championship | Final | Champions |
| 1971 Maghreb Nations Championship | Final | Champions |
| 1973 Maghreb Nations Championship | Final | Champions |
| 1998 Paris Ile-de-France tournament | Semi-final | Third place |
| 1999 Spain international tournament | Semi-final | Third place |
| 2002 Paris Ile-de-France tournament | Semi-final | Third place |
| 2002 Yellow Cup | Final | Runners-up |
| 2002 Spain international tournament | Semi-final | Third place |
| 2003 Yellow Cup | Final | Runners-up |
| 2004 Yellow Cup | Final | Runners-up |
| 2005 Paris Ile-de-France tournament | Final | Champions |
| 2006 World cup | Final | Runners-up |
| 2007 Paris Ile-de-France tournament | Semi-final | Third place |
| 2007 Yellow Cup | Final | Champions |
| 2008 Challenge Marrane | Final | Champions |
| 2008 Yellow Cup | Semi-final | Third place |
| 2010 Yellow Cup | Semi-final | Third place |
| 2012 Spain international tournament | Semi-final | Third place |
| 2013 Paris Ile-de-France tournament | Semi-final | Third place |
| 2015 Yellow Cup | Final | Champions |
| 2015 Tunisia international tournament | Final | Champions |
| 2015 Four Nations Tournament | Final | Runners-up |
| 2016 Yellow Cup | Final | Champions |
| 2017 Tunisia international tournament | Final | Champions |
| 2019 Yellow Cup | Final | Champions |
| 2019 Air Caraïbes Cup | Final | Runners-up |
| 2020 Yellow Cup | Final | Runners-up |
| 2021 Tunisia international tournament | Final | Champions |
| 2021 Four Nations Cup Poland | Final | Champions |
| 2022 Four Nations Cup Poland | Final | Champions |

== Team ==
=== Current squad ===
Squad for the 2025 World Men's Handball Championship.

Head coach: Mohamed Sghir

| No. | Pos. | Name | Date of birth (age) | Height | App. | Goals | Club |
|---|---|---|---|---|---|---|---|
| 6 | P | Ghazi Ben Ghali | 28 March 1999 (age 27) | 1.98 m | 31 | 29 | (Qatar) Al-Gharafa |
| 16 | GK | Mohamed Sfar | 4 January 1990 (age 36) | 1.94 m | 44 | 0 | (Tunisia) Espérance de Tunis |
| 17 | RB | Oussama Hosni | 17 September 1992 (age 34) | 1.92 m | 130 | 162 | (North Macedonia) RK Eurofarm Pelister |
| 22 | LB | Youssef Maaraf | 21 July 1996 (age 30) | 1.95 m | 100 | 185 | (Saudi Arabia) Al Safa |
| 23 | LW | Oussama Rmeiki | 8 October 1996 (age 30) | 1.92 m | 42 | 67 | (Tunisia) Club Africain |
| 25 | CB | Abdelhak Ben Salah | 25 April 1990 (age 36) | 1.84 m | 84 | 170 | (Tunisia) Espérance de Tunis |
| 28 | LB | Hazem Bacha | 8 December 2001 (age 24) | 2.05 m | 33 | 66 | (Tunisia) Espérance de Tunis |
| 29 | RW | Tarek Jallouz | 1 November 1993 (age 32) | 1.83 m | 38 | 58 | (Tunisia) Espérance de Tunis |
| 31 | LB | Mohamed Frad | 25 September 1993 (age 33) | 1.87 m | 20 | 20 | (Kuwait) Kazma |
| 33 | RB | Yassine Ben Salem | 11 January 2003 (age 23) | 1.92 m | 13 | 24 | (France) C' Chartres Métropole Handball |
| 39 | CB | Rayen Zariat | 11 January 2003 (age 23) | 1.90 m | 15 | 12 | (United Arab Emirates) Shabab Al Ahli Club |
| 55 | LW | Ghassen Toumi | 14 June 1997 (age 29) | 1.84 m | 70 | 159 | (Tunisia) Espérance de Tunis |
| 61 | GK | Yassine Belkaied | 19 October 2000 (age 26) | 1.97 m | 38 | 3 | (France) Fenix Toulouse Handball |
| 72 | P | Mohamed Ben Hammouda | 7 December 2002 (age 23) | 1.92 m | 7 | 5 | (Tunisia) Association Sportive d'Hammamet |
| 93 | GK | Fradj Ben Tekaya | 29 April 1998 (age 28) | 1.91 m | 5 | 0 | (Spain) BM Ciudad Encantada |
| 96 | RB | Anouar Ben Abdallah | 20 June 1996 (age 30) | 1.86 m | 80 | 167 | (Kuwait) Kazma |
| 97 | RB | Achref Marghli | 22 May 1997 (age 29) | 1.93 m | 18 | 21 | (North Macedonia) RK Vardar |
| 98 | P | Islem Jbeli | 13 December 1998 (age 27) | 1.93 m | 39 | 72 | (Tunisia) Espérance de Tunis |

=== Head coaches ===
| Period | Head Coach | Honours |
|---|---|---|
| 1957–1962 | (France) Yves Boulogne | —N/a |
| 1962 | (France) Michel Djulizibaric | —N/a |
| 1962–1966 | (Tunisia) Mohamed Louahchy | —N/a |
| 1966–1968 | (Romania) Constantin Popa & (Romania) Haralambie Firan | —N/a |
| 1968–1972 | (Romania) Haralambie Firan | —N/a |
| 1973–1975 | (Romania) Ion Popescu | (gold) 1974 |
| 1976–1979 | (Tunisia) Saïd Amara | (gold) 1976 |
| 1979–1982 | (Tunisia) Hachemi Razgallah | (gold) 1979 |
| 1982–1983 | (Soviet Union) Guennadi Antchenko | (bronze) 1981 |
| 1983–1985 | (East Germany) Reiner Ganschow | (bronze) 1983 (silver) 1985 |
| 1985–1987 | (Tunisia) Sayed Ayari | (bronze) 1987 (bronze) 1989 |
| 1987–1989 | (Tunisia) Moncef Hajjar | —N/a |
| 1989–1990 | (Tunisia) Saïd Amara | —N/a |
| 1990–1991 | (Tunisia) Lamjed Amroussi | (bronze) 1991 |
| 1991–1994 | (Tunisia) Hachemi Razgallah | (silver) 1992 |
| 1994–1996 | (Tunisia) Sayed Ayari & (Tunisia) Saïd Amara | (gold) 1994 (silver) 1996 (gold) 1998 |
| 1996–1997 | (Tunisia) Saïd Amara | —N/a |
| 1997 | (Tunisia) Brahim Agrebi | —N/a |
| 1997–1998 | (Tunisia) Noureddine Ben Ameur | —N/a |
| 1998–2003 | (Tunisia) Sayed Ayari & (Tunisia) Saïd Amara | (bronze) 2000 (gold) 2002 |
| 2003 | (Tunisia) Sayed Ayari | —N/a |
| 2004 | (Serbia) Zoran Živković | (silver) 2004 |
| 2004–2008 | (Croatia) Sead Hasanefendić | (gold) 2006 (silver) 2008 |
| 2008–2009 | (Serbia) Zoran Živković | —N/a |
| 2009 | (Tunisia) Sayed Ayari | —N/a |
| 2009–2014 | (France) Alain Portes | (gold) 2010 (gold) 2012 |
| 2014–2015 | (Croatia) Sead Hasanefendić | (silver) 2014 |
| 2015–2016 | (France) Sylvain Nouet | (silver) 2016 |
| 2016–2017 | (Tunisia) Hafedh Zouabi | —N/a |
| 2017–2020 | (Spain) Toni Gerona | (gold) 2018 (silver) 2020 |
| 2020–2022 | (Tunisia) Sami Saïdi | —N/a |
| 2022– | (France) Patrick Cazal | (bronze) 2024 |

=== Notable players ===
- Hamza Majed
- Makrem Missaoui
- Marouen Maggaiz
- Slim Zehani
- Makrem Jerou
- Mahmoud Gharbi
- Mohamed Messaoudi
- Mohamed Darmoul
- Marouan Chouiref
- Khaled Haj Youssef
- Mosbah Sanaï
- Heykel Megannem
- Issam Tej
- Ali Madi
- Mohamed Madi
- Dhaker Seboui
- Sobhi Saïed
- Sobhi Sioud
- Wael Jallouz
- Tarak Jallouz
- Ramzi Majdoub
- Wassim Helal
- Wissem Hmam
- Ouissem Bousnina
- Amine Bannour
- Anouar Ayed
- Anouar Ben Abdallah
- Oussama Boughanmi
- Oualid Ben Amor
- Oussama Jaziri
- Oussama Hosni
- Jihed Jaballah
- Selim Hedoui
- Rafik Bacha
- Mahmoud Gharbi
- Jaleleddine Touati
- Aymen Hammed
- Aymen Toumi
- Kamel Alouini
- Youssef Benali

== See also ==
- Tunisian Handball Federation
- Tunisia women's national handball team
- Tunisia men's national junior handball team
- Tunisia men's national youth handball team
- Tunisia women's national junior handball team
- Tunisia women's national youth handball team

Other handball codes

- Tunisia national beach handball team
- Tunisia women's national beach handball team
