= Ivory Coast men's national handball team =

Ivory Coast

Information
- Nickname: The Elephants
- Association: Ivorian Handball Federation

Colours
1st	2nd

Results

African Championship
- Appearances: 17 (First in 1976)
- Best result: (silver) 2nd (1981)
- Last updated on Unknown.

The Ivory Coast national handball team is the national handball team of the Ivory Coast (Cote d'Ivoire). The team has made 16 appearances in the African Championship, but has yet to qualify for the World Handball Championship or Summer Olympics.

In 1981, the Ivory Coast finished second at the African Championship, its best result to date. In 1992, the Ivory Coast hosted the African Championship, with the team finishing 5th.

== African Championship record ==
Year	Position	Year	Position	Year	Position
Tunisia 1974	did not compete	Benin 1996	8th	Gabon 2018	did not compete
Algeria 1976	6th	South Africa 1998	7th	Tunisia 2020	14th place
Republic of the Congo 1979	7th	Algeria 2000	did not compete		
Tunisia 1981	2nd	Morocco 2002	10th		
Egypt 1983	6th	Egypt 2004	did not compete		
Tunisia 1985	6th	Tunisia 2006	7th		
Morocco 1987	6th	Angola 2008	did not compete		
Algeria 1989	6th	Egypt 2010	12th		
Egypt 1991	5th	Morocco 2012	10th		
Côte d'Ivoire 1992	5th	Algeria 2014	did not compete		
Tunisia 1994	6th	Egypt 2016	did not compete		

- Red border color indicates tournament was held on home soil; dark gray indicates the squad's best result.
