= Burkina Faso men's national handball team =

Burkina Faso

Information
- Association: Fédération Burkinabè de Handball

Colours
1st	2nd

Results

African Championship
- Appearances: 1 (First in 2012)
- Best result: 12th (2012)
- Last updated on Unknown.

The Burkina Faso national handball team is the national handball team of Burkina Faso.

== African Championship record ==
- 2012 – 12th place
