= Slim Zehani =

Tunisian handball player (born 1978)

Personal information
- Nationality: Tunisia
- Born: 25 September 1978 (age 48) Tunis, Tunisia
- Height: 190 cm (75 in)

Sport
- Sport: Handball

Senior clubs
- Years: Team
- ?-?: Espérance ST
National team
Years	Team	Apps
?-?	Tunisia	6
- Updated on only during the 2000 Summer Olympics

Slim Zehani (سليم زهاني, born 25 September 1978) is a Tunisian male handball player. He was a member of the Tunisia men's national handball team. He was part of the team at the 2000 Summer Olympics, playing six matches. On club level he played for Espérance ST in Tunis.
