= Ivorian Handball Federation =

Governing body of handball in Côte d'Ivoire

Ivorian Handball Federation French: Fédération ivoirienne de handball FIHB
- IOC nation: Ivory Coast (CIV)
- Sport: Handball
- Other sports: Beach handball
- Official website: www.fi-handball.ci

HISTORY
- Year of formation: 21 September 1960; 65 years ago

AFFILIATIONS
- International federation: International Handball Federation (IHF)
- IHF member since: 1962
- Continental association: African Handball Confederation
- National Olympic Committee: Comité National Olympique de Côte d'Ivoire

GOVERNING BODY
- President: Dr. Aboubacar Karaboue

HEADQUARTERS
- Address: Stade Félix Houphouët, Boigny 01, Boîte Postale 12647, Abidjan 01
- Country: Ivory Coast
- Secretary General: Ibrahiman Kamara

The Ivorian Handball Federation (French: Fédération ivoirienne de handball) (FIHB) is the administrative and controlling body for handball and beach handball in Republic of Côte d'Ivoire. Founded in 1960, FIHB is a member of African Handball Confederation (CAHB) and the International Handball Federation (IHF).

== National teams ==
- Ivory Coast men's national handball team
- Ivory Coast men's national junior handball team
- Ivory Coast women's national handball team
