= Cameroon men's national handball team =

Cameroon

Information
- Association: Cameroon Handball Federation
- Coach: Bertin Njantou
- Assistant coach: Oumarou Mouhamed; Justin Yakan

Colours
1st	2nd

Results

African Championship
- Appearances: 19 (First in 1974)
- Best result: (silver) 2nd (1974)
- Last updated on Unknown.

The Cameroon national handball team is the national handball team of Cameroon.

== Tournament record ==
=== African Championship ===
Year	Position
Tunisia 1974	2nd
Algeria 1976	3rd
Republic of the Congo 1979	5th
Tunisia 1981	did not participate
Egypt 1983	did not participate
Tunisia 1985	8th
Morocco 1987	did not participate
Algeria 1989	did not participate
Egypt 1991	did not participate
Côte d'Ivoire 1992	did not participate
Tunisia 1994	did not participate
Benin 1996	7th
South Africa 1998	9th
Algeria 2000	did not participate

Year	Position
Morocco 2002	5th
Egypt 2004	6th
Tunisia 2006	9th
Angola 2008	7th
Egypt 2010	10th
Morocco 2012	7th
Algeria 2014	5th
Egypt 2016	5th
Gabon 2018	9th
Tunisia 2020	11th
Egypt 2022	12th
Egypt 2024	10th
Rwanda 2026	10th
Total	19/27

=== IHF Emerging Nations Championship ===
- 2015 – 7th place
