= Handball at the 1978 All-Africa Games =

Tournament details
- Host country: Algeria
- Venue(s): 2 (in 1 host city)
- Dates: 13–25 July
- Teams: 7+6 (from 1 confederation)

Final positions
- Champions: Algeria (men); Algeria (women)
- Runner-up: Tunisia (men); Cameroon (women)
- Third place: Cameroon (men); Tunisia(women)

The handball events at the 1978 All-Africa Games were held in Algiers, Algeria from 13 to 28 July 1978. The competition included for the first time the women's tournament while the men's tournament is played for the third time.

== Events ==
=== Men's tournament ===
Final standing is:

Pos	Team	Pld	W	D	L	Pts
Gold medal	Algeria	4	4	0	0	8
Silver medal	Tunisia	5	4	0	1	8
Bronze medal	Cameroon	4	2	0	2	4
4	Madagascar	5	1	0	4	2
5	Senegal	2	0	0	2	0
6	Benin	3	0	0	3	0
7	Egypt (W)	3	2	0	1	4

(W) Withdrew

=== Women's tournament ===
Final standing is:

Rank	Team	Record
Gold medal	Algeria	4–0
Silver medal	Cameroon	2–1
Bronze medal	Tunisia	2–1
4	Ivory Coast	1–3
5	Nigeria	1–2
6	Egypt	0–3
