= Saïd Amara (handball) =

Tunisian handball player (1944–2020)

Personal information
- Nationality: Tunisian
- Born: 28 March 1944
- Died: 10 February 2020 (aged 75)

Sport
- Sport: Handball

Senior clubs
- Years: Team
- 1964–1968: Espérance Sportive de Tunis

Teams managed
- 1968–1969: CS Sfaxien
- 1969–1970: CO Transports
- 1970–1976: Espérance Sportive de Tunis
- 1975–1976: National Team
- 1977–1980: Stade Tunisien
- 1978–1979: National Team
- 1981–1984: Stade Tunisien
- 1985–1989: Al Ahly
- 1989–1990: National Team
- 1990–1991: Espérence Sportive de Tunis
- 1994–2001: National Team

Saïd Amara (28 March 1944 – 10 February 2020) was a Tunisian handball player and coach.
