= Congo men's national handball team =

National handball team

Congo

Information
- Association: Congolese Handball Federation
- Coach: Younes Tatby
- Assistant coach: Roch Okomo

Colours
1st	2nd

Results

African Championship
- Appearances: 22 (First in 1979)
- Best result: (silver) 2nd (1983)
- Last updated on Unknown.

The Republic of the Congo national handball team is the national handball team of Congo.

== African Championship record ==
Year	Position	Year	Position	Year	Position
Tunisia 1974	did not compete	Benin 1996	6th	Gabon 2018	7th
Algeria 1976	did not compete	South Africa 1998	6th	Tunisia 2020	9th
Republic of the Congo 1979	4th	Algeria 2000	5th	Egypt 2024	13th
Tunisia 1981	7th	Morocco 2002	11th	Rwanda 2026	11th
Egypt 1983	2nd	Egypt 2004	9th		
Tunisia 1985	3rd	Tunisia 2006	6th		
Morocco 1987	4th	Angola 2008	did not compete		
Algeria 1989	4th	Egypt 2010	8th		
Egypt 1991	7th	Morocco 2012	9th		
Côte d'Ivoire 1992	did not compete	Algeria 2014	7th		
Tunisia 1994	5th	Egypt 2016	8th		

- Red border color indicates tournament was held on home :soil.
