= Djamel Yahiouche =

Algerian swimmer (born 1959)

Personal information
- Nationality: Algerian
- Born: 25 February 1959 (age 67)

Sport
- Sport: Swimming
Medal record
Men's swimming
Representing Algeria
All-Africa Games
Silver medal – second place	1978 Algiers	200 m breaststroke

Djamel Yahiouche (born 25 February 1959) is an Algerian swimmer. He competed in four events at the 1980 Summer Olympics.

Olympic Games
Preceded by Azzedine Azzouzi	Flagbearer for Algeria; 1980 Moscow	Succeeded by Abdelkrim Bendjemil
