= Majed Hamza =

Tunisian handball player

Personal information
- Nationality: Tunisian
- Born: 8 February 1983 (age 43) Sousse, Tunisia
- Height: 1.86 m (6 ft 1 in)

Sport
- Sport: Handball
- Position: Goalkeeper

Senior clubs
- Years: Team
- 2007–2013: ES Sahel
- 2014–2016: Al Rayyan
- 2016–: ES Sahel
National team
Years	Team	Apps	(Gls)
–	Tunisia	43	(0)
Medal record
African Championship
Silver medal – second place	2016 Egypt
Gold medal – first place	2018 Gabon

Majed Hamza (born 8 February 1983) is a Tunisian handball player for Al Rayyan and the Tunisian national team.
