= Congolese Handball Federation =

Governing body of handball in the Republic of the Congo

Congolese Handball Federation French: Fédération Congolaise de Handball CHF
- IOC nation: Republic of the Congo (CGO)
- Sport: Handball
- Other sports: Beach handball

HISTORY
- Year of formation: 1970; 55 years ago

AFFILIATIONS
- International federation: International Handball Federation (IHF)
- IHF member since: 1970
- Continental association: African Handball Confederation
- National Olympic Committee: Congolese National Olympic and Sports Committee

GOVERNING BODY
- President: Jean Claude Ibovi

HEADQUARTERS
- Address: Complexe Sportif Alphnose, Massamba Débat, Boîte Postale 15.448 Brazzaville
- Country: Congo (Republic of the Congo)
- Secretary General: Bernard Mangota

The Congolese Handball Federation (French: Fédération Congolaise de Handball) (CHF) is the administrative and controlling body for handball and beach handball in the Republic of the Congo. Founded in 1970, CHF is a member of African Handball Confederation (CAHB) and the International Handball Federation (IHF).

== National teams ==
- Congo men's national handball team
- Congo men's national junior handball team
- Congo women's national handball team
