= Mahmoud Gharbi =

Tunisian handball player

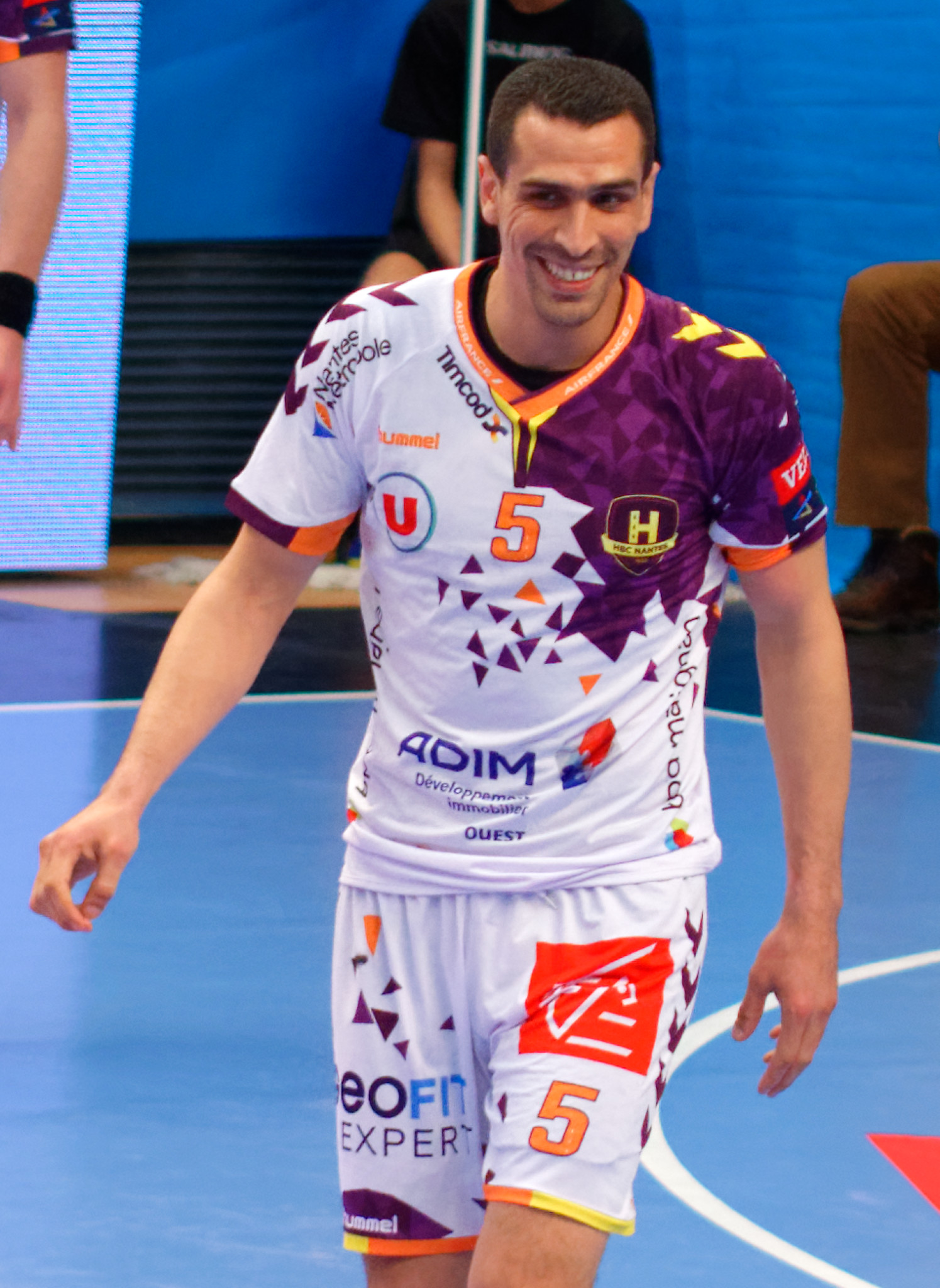

Personal information
- Nationality: Tunisian
- Born: 11 February 1982 (age 44) Tunis, Tunisia
- Height: 1.91 m (6 ft 3 in)

Sport
- Sport: Handball
- Position: Pivot
- Current club: HBC Nantes
- Number: 5
National team
| Years | Team | Apps | (Gls) |
| – | Tunisia | 179 | (289) |
Medal record
Mediterranean Games
| Bronze medal – third place | 2009 Pescara | Team |

Mahmoud Gharbi (born 11 February 1982) is a Tunisian handball player. At the 2012 Summer Olympics he competed with the Tunisia men's national handball team in the men's tournament.
