= Issam Tej =

Qatari handball player

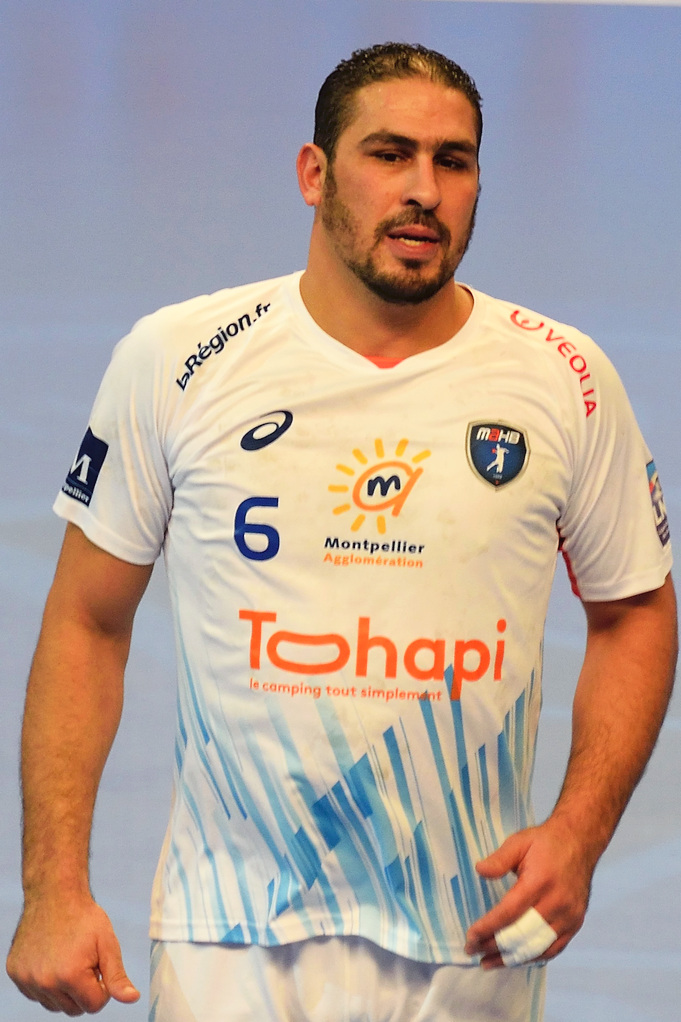

Personal information
- Nationality: Tunisian
- Born: 29 July 1979 (age 47) Tunis, Tunisia
- Height: 1.87 m (6 ft 2 in)

Sport
- Sport: Handball
- Position: Pivot
- Current club: Al Rayyan
- Number: 6
National team
Years	Team	Apps	(Gls)
1999–	Tunisia	316	(824)
Medal record
Men's handball
Representing Tunisia
Mediterranean Games
Silver medal – second place	2001 Tunis	Team competition

Issam Tej (Arabic: عصام تاج, born 29 July 1979) is a former Tunisian handball player for Qatari Al Rayyan and the Tunisia.

He competed at the 2000 Summer Olympics in Sydney. He also competed for the Tunisian national team at the 2012 Summer Olympics in London, where the Tunisian team reached the quarterfinals.
