= 2012 African Men's Handball Championship =

2012 African Championship
Tournament details
- Host country: Morocco
- Venue(s): 3 (in 2 host cities)
- Dates: 11–20 January
- Teams: 12 (from 1 confederation)

Final positions
- Champions: Tunisia (9th title)
- Runners-up: Algeria
- Third place: Egypt
- Fourth place: Morocco

Tournament statistics
- Matches played: 44
- Goals scored: 2,173 (49.39 per match)
- Top scorer(s): (Cameroon) William Fankoua

Awards
- Best player: (Morocco) Soufyan Sayad

The 2012 African Men's Handball Championship was the 20th edition of the African Men's Handball Championship, organized by the African Handball Confederation, which acted as the qualification process for the 2013 World Men's Handball Championship. It was the 20th edition of the tournament and was held in Rabat and Salé, Morocco between 11 and 20 January 2012. The winner qualified for the 2012 Summer Olympics.

== Teams ==
Group A	Group B
Tunisia; DR Congo; Morocco; Gabon; Congo; Senegal	Egypt; Algeria; Angola; Cameroon; Ivory Coast; Burkina Faso

== Venues ==
Rabat
Salle Moulay Abdellah	Salle Ibn Yassine
Capacity: 10,000	Capacity: 5,000
Salé	2012 African Men's Handball Championship is located in Morocco
Hall Fathallah El Bouazzaoui	2012 African Men's Handball Championship is located in Morocco
Capacity: 2,000	2012 African Men's Handball Championship is located in Morocco

== Preliminary round ==
The draw was held on 24 September 2011 at Casablanca, Morocco.

All times are local (UTC±0).

=== Group A ===
Team	Pld	W	D	L	GF	GA	GD	Pts
Tunisia	5	5	0	0	155	92	+63	10
Morocco (H)	5	4	0	1	128	117	+11	8
DR Congo	5	3	0	2	123	129	−6	6
Senegal	5	2	0	3	134	132	+2	4
Congo	5	1	0	4	110	148	−38	2
Gabon	5	0	0	5	108	140	−32	0

(H) Hosts

11 January 2012; 11:00	DR Congo	26–21	Senegal	Salle Moulay Abdellah, Rabat
11 January 2012; 11:00		(9–13)		Salle Moulay Abdellah, Rabat

11 January 2012; 17:00	Tunisia	35–18	Gabon	Salle Ibn Yassine, Rabat; Referees: Colibaly, Nanga (CIV)
11 January 2012; 17:00	Ayed 6	(18–9)	Ostinda 8	Salle Ibn Yassine, Rabat; Referees: Colibaly, Nanga (CIV)
11 January 2012; 17:00	3× (yellow card) 5× (suspension)		2× (yellow card) 2× (suspension)	Salle Ibn Yassine, Rabat; Referees: Colibaly, Nanga (CIV)

11 January 2012; 20:30	Morocco	28–24	Congo	Salle Ibn Yassine, Rabat
11 January 2012; 20:30		(15–10)		Salle Ibn Yassine, Rabat

12 January 2012; 15:00	Gabon	20–25	DR Congo	Salle Moulay Abdellah, Rabat
12 January 2012; 15:00		(14–11)		Salle Moulay Abdellah, Rabat

12 January 2012; 17:00	Senegal	26–31	Morocco	Salle Ibn Yassine, Rabat
12 January 2012; 17:00		(12–12)		Salle Ibn Yassine, Rabat

12 January 2012; 20:00	Congo	15–32	Tunisia	Salle Ibn Yassine, Rabat; Referees: Abdelaziz, Mohammed Samy (EGY)
12 January 2012; 20:00	five players 2	(5–17)	four players 4	Salle Ibn Yassine, Rabat; Referees: Abdelaziz, Mohammed Samy (EGY)
12 January 2012; 20:00	3× (yellow card) 3× (suspension)		3× (yellow card) 3× (suspension)	Salle Ibn Yassine, Rabat; Referees: Abdelaziz, Mohammed Samy (EGY)

13 January 2012; 15:00	Gabon	20–21	Congo	Salle Moulay Abdellah, Rabat
13 January 2012; 15:00		(9–9)		Salle Moulay Abdellah, Rabat

13 January 2012; 17:00	Tunisia	30–21	Senegal	Salle Ibn Yassine, Rabat; Referees: Nasse, Bouchaid (MAR)
13 January 2012; 17:00	Sanai 7	(16–9)	Ibrahima 5	Salle Ibn Yassine, Rabat; Referees: Nasse, Bouchaid (MAR)
13 January 2012; 17:00	1× (yellow card) 4× (suspension)		2× (yellow card) 5× (suspension)	Salle Ibn Yassine, Rabat; Referees: Nasse, Bouchaid (MAR)

13 January 2012; 20:00	DR Congo	17–25	Morocco	Salle Ibn Yassine, Rabat
13 January 2012; 20:00		(5–9)		Salle Ibn Yassine, Rabat

15 January 2012; 11:00	DR Congo	35–31	Congo	Salle Moulay Abdellah, Rabat
15 January 2012; 11:00		(19–11)		Salle Moulay Abdellah, Rabat

15 January 2012; 13:00	Senegal	33–26	Gabon	Salle Moulay Abdellah, Rabat
15 January 2012; 13:00		(16–14)		Salle Moulay Abdellah, Rabat

15 January 2012; 20:00	Morocco	18–26	Tunisia	Salle Ibn Yassine, Rabat; Referees: Akptasta, Yawo Mawusse (TOG)
15 January 2012; 20:00	Sayad 5	(12–13)	Bannour 6	Salle Ibn Yassine, Rabat; Referees: Akptasta, Yawo Mawusse (TOG)
15 January 2012; 20:00	3× (yellow card) 5× (suspension)		3× (yellow card) 4× (suspension)	Salle Ibn Yassine, Rabat; Referees: Akptasta, Yawo Mawusse (TOG)

16 January 2012; 11:00	Congo	19–33	Senegal	Salle Moulay Abdellah, Rabat
16 January 2012; 11:00		(9–19)		Salle Moulay Abdellah, Rabat

16 January 2012; 15:00	Morocco	26–24	Gabon	Salle Ibn Yassine, Rabat
16 January 2012; 15:00		(17–11)		Salle Ibn Yassine, Rabat

16 January 2012; 17:00	Tunisia	32–20	DR Congo	Salle Ibn Yassine, Rabat; Referees: Badura, Michal (SVK)
16 January 2012; 17:00	Sanai 7	(17–11)	Kiangebeni 7	Salle Ibn Yassine, Rabat; Referees: Badura, Michal (SVK)
16 January 2012; 17:00	2× (yellow card) 2× (suspension)		3× (yellow card) 5× (suspension)	Salle Ibn Yassine, Rabat; Referees: Badura, Michal (SVK)

=== Group B ===
Team	Pld	W	D	L	GF	GA	GD	Pts
Egypt	5	4	1	0	154	101	+53	9
Algeria	5	4	1	0	149	103	+46	9
Angola	5	3	0	2	118	93	+25	6
Cameroon	5	2	0	3	119	118	+1	4
Ivory Coast	5	1	0	4	112	146	−34	2
Burkina Faso	5	0	0	5	69	160	−91	0

All times are local (UTC±0).

11 January 2012; 13:00	Egypt	25–14	Cameroon	Salle Ibn Yassine, Rabat
11 January 2012; 13:00		(13–8)		Salle Ibn Yassine, Rabat

11 January 2012; 15:00	Angola	27–17	Ivory Coast	Hall Fathallah El Bouazzaoui, Salé
11 January 2012; 15:00		(11–6)		Hall Fathallah El Bouazzaoui, Salé

11 January 2012; 15:00	Algeria	33–16	Burkina Faso	Salle Ibn Yassine, Rabat
11 January 2012; 15:00		(18–10)		Salle Ibn Yassine, Rabat

12 January 2012; 13:00	Ivory Coast	21–40	Egypt	Salle Ibn Yassine, Rabat
12 January 2012; 13:00		(12–19)		Salle Ibn Yassine, Rabat

12 January 2012; 13:00	Burkina Faso	7–30	Angola	Salle Moulay Abdellah, Rabat
12 January 2012; 13:00		(2–15)		Salle Moulay Abdellah, Rabat

12 January 2012; 15:00	Cameroon	18–27	Algeria	Salle Ibn Yassine, Rabat
12 January 2012; 15:00		(8–14)		Salle Ibn Yassine, Rabat

13 January 2012; 11:00	Cameroon	32–19	Ivory Coast	Salle Moulay Abdellah, Rabat
13 January 2012; 11:00		(17–9)		Salle Moulay Abdellah, Rabat

13 January 2012; 13:00	Egypt	32–18	Burkina Faso	Salle Ibn Yassine, Rabat
13 January 2012; 13:00		(12–8)		Salle Ibn Yassine, Rabat

13 January 2012; 15:00	Algeria	21–15	Angola	Salle Ibn Yassine, Rabat
13 January 2012; 15:00		(11–6)		Salle Ibn Yassine, Rabat

15 January 2012; 11:00	Burkina Faso	15–30	Cameroon	Hall Fathallah El Bouazzaoui, Salé
15 January 2012; 11:00		(7–19)		Hall Fathallah El Bouazzaoui, Salé

15 January 2012; 15:00	Algeria	34–20	Ivory Coast	Salle Ibn Yassine, Rabat
15 January 2012; 15:00		(19–9)		Salle Ibn Yassine, Rabat

15 January 2012; 17:00	Angola	14–23	Egypt	Salle Ibn Yassine, Rabat
15 January 2012; 17:00		(8–10)		Salle Ibn Yassine, Rabat

16 January 2012; 15:00	Angola	32–25	Cameroon	Hall Fathallah El Bouazzaoui, Salé
16 January 2012; 15:00		(21–16)		Hall Fathallah El Bouazzaoui, Salé

16 January 2012; 19:00	Ivory Coast	35–13	Burkina Faso	Salle Moulay Abdellah, Rabat
16 January 2012; 19:00		(16–6)		Salle Moulay Abdellah, Rabat

16 January 2012; 20:00	Egypt	34–34	Algeria	Salle Ibn Yassine, Rabat
16 January 2012; 20:00		(20–16)		Salle Ibn Yassine, Rabat

== Knockout stage ==
=== Bracket ===
Quarter-finals
17 January
Tunisia	26
Cameroon	17
17 January
Morocco	24
Angola	22
17 January
Algeria	33
DR Congo	31
17 January
Senegal	19
Egypt	31

Semi-finals
19 January
Tunisia	28
Morocco	16
19 January
Algeria	26
Egypt	25

Final
20 January
Tunisia	23
Algeria	20
Third place
20 January
Morocco	15
Egypt	29

5–8th bracket

Semifinals
18 January
Cameroon	23
Angola	24
18 January
DR Congo	32
Senegal	33

Fifth place
19 January
Angola	27
Senegal (Pen.)	28
Seventh place
19 January
Cameroon	29
DR Congo	25

All times are local (UTC±0).

=== Quarterfinals ===
17 January 2012; 12:00	Egypt	31–19	Senegal	Salle Ibn Yassine, Rabat
17 January 2012; 12:00		(15–8)		Salle Ibn Yassine, Rabat

17 January 2012; 14:30	DR Congo	31–33	Algeria	Salle Ibn Yassine, Rabat
17 January 2012; 14:30		(15–14)		Salle Ibn Yassine, Rabat

17 January 2012; 17:00	Tunisia	26–17	Cameroon	Salle Ibn Yassine, Rabat; Referees: Massimina, Alain Fortuné (CGO)
17 January 2012; 17:00	Bannour 7	(11–7)	Fankoua 10	Salle Ibn Yassine, Rabat; Referees: Massimina, Alain Fortuné (CGO)
17 January 2012; 17:00	3× (yellow card) 3× (suspension)		3× (yellow card) 5× (suspension) 1× (red card)	Salle Ibn Yassine, Rabat; Referees: Massimina, Alain Fortuné (CGO)

17 January 2012; 20:00	Angola	22–24	Morocco	Salle Ibn Yassine, Rabat
17 January 2012; 20:00		(11–11)		Salle Ibn Yassine, Rabat

=== 5–8th semifinals ===
18 January 2012; 09:00	Cameroon	23–24	Angola	Hall Fathallah El Bouazzaoui, Salé
18 January 2012; 09:00		(8–13)		Hall Fathallah El Bouazzaoui, Salé

18 January 2012; 11:00	DR Congo	32–33	Senegal	Hall Fathallah El Bouazzaoui, Salé
18 January 2012; 11:00		(15–14)		Hall Fathallah El Bouazzaoui, Salé

=== Semifinals ===
19 January 2012; 17:00	Egypt	25–26	Algeria	Salle Ibn Yassine, Rabat
19 January 2012; 17:00		(14–12)		Salle Ibn Yassine, Rabat

19 January 2012; 20:00	Tunisia	28–16	Morocco	Salle Ibn Yassine, Rabat; Referees: Charlotte et Julie Bonaventura (FRA)
19 January 2012; 20:00	three players 4	(15–7)	Koasai 3	Salle Ibn Yassine, Rabat; Referees: Charlotte et Julie Bonaventura (FRA)
19 January 2012; 20:00	3× (yellow card) 2× (suspension)		3× (yellow card) 2× (suspension)	Salle Ibn Yassine, Rabat; Referees: Charlotte et Julie Bonaventura (FRA)

=== Eleventh place game ===
17 January 2012; 11:00	Gabon	26–20	Burkina Faso	Hall Fathallah El Bouazzaoui, Salé
17 January 2012; 11:00		(13–5)		Hall Fathallah El Bouazzaoui, Salé

=== Ninth place game ===
17 January 2012; 13:00	Congo	31–20	Ivory Coast	Hall Fathallah El Bouazzaoui, Salé
17 January 2012; 13:00		(18–10)		Hall Fathallah El Bouazzaoui, Salé

=== Seventh place game ===
19 January 2012; 13:00	Cameroon	29–25	DR Congo	Hall Fathallah El Bouazzaoui, Salé
19 January 2012; 13:00		(13–15)		Hall Fathallah El Bouazzaoui, Salé

=== Fifth place game ===
19 January 2012
17:00
Angola
27–28
Senegal
Hall Fathallah El Bouazzaoui, Salé

(1–10)

FT: 24–24 Pen: 3–4

=== Bronze medal game ===
20 January 2012; 17:00	Egypt	29–15	Morocco	Salle Ibn Yassine, Rabat; Referees: Akptasta, Yawo Mawusse (TOG)
20 January 2012; 17:00	Zaky 9	(16–5)	Hammadi 4	Salle Ibn Yassine, Rabat; Referees: Akptasta, Yawo Mawusse (TOG)
20 January 2012; 17:00	3× (yellow card) 4× (suspension)		3× (yellow card) 4× (suspension)	Salle Ibn Yassine, Rabat; Referees: Akptasta, Yawo Mawusse (TOG)

=== Final ===
20 January 2012; 20:00	Algeria	20–23	Tunisia	Salle Ibn Yassine, Rabat; Referees: Badura, Michal (SVK)
20 January 2012; 20:00	Chahbour, Rahim 4	(6–12)	Megannem 6	Salle Ibn Yassine, Rabat; Referees: Badura, Michal (SVK)
20 January 2012; 20:00	2× (yellow card) 4× (suspension)		3× (yellow card) 3× (suspension)	Salle Ibn Yassine, Rabat; Referees: Badura, Michal (SVK)

== Final standings ==
Qualified for the 2013 World Championship

Rank	Team	Record
Gold medal	Tunisia	8–0–0
Silver medal	Algeria	6–1–1
Bronze medal	Egypt	6–1–1
4	Morocco	5–0–3
5	Senegal	4–0–4
6	Angola	4–0–4
7	Cameroon	3–0–5
8	DR Congo	3–0–5
9	Congo	2–0–4
10	Ivory Coast	1–0–5
11	Gabon	1–0–5
12	Burkina Faso	0–0–6

== Awards ==
2012 African Handball Championship

Tunisia
9th title

Best Player
(Morocco) Soufyan Sayad

=== All-Tournament Team ===
All-star team was:

GK	(Morocco)	Yassine Idrissi
RW	(Egypt)	Abouelfetoh Abdelrazek
RB	(Tunisia)	Amine Bannour
CB	(Tunisia)	Heykel Megannem
LB	(Algeria)	Saci Boultif
LW	(Algeria)	Riad Chahbour
P	(Tunisia)	Issam Tej

== See also ==
- 2012 African Handball Champions League
- 2012 African Men's Junior Handball Championship
- 2012 African Men's Youth Handball Championship
