= 1985 African Men's Handball Championship =

International handball competition

1985 African Men's Championship
Tournament details
- Host country: Angola
- Venue(s): 1 (in 1 host city)
- Dates: 14–23 September
- Teams: 9 (from 1 confederation)

Final positions
- Champions: Algeria (3rd title)
- Runners-up: Tunisia
- Third place: Congo
- Fourth place: Egypt

The 1985 African Men's Handball Championship was the sixth edition of the African Men's Handball Championship, held in Luanda, Angola, from 14 to 23 September 1985. It acted as the African qualifying tournament for the 1986 World Championship in Switzerland.

In the final, Algeria won their third consecutive title beating Tunisia in the final game.

== Qualified teams ==
- Algeria
- Angola (hosts)
- Cameroon
- Congo
- Egypt
- Ivory Coast
- Nigeria
- Tunisia

Other teams intended to participate:

- Guinea
- Morocco
- Senegal

== Group stage ==
Team advance to the knockout stage

=== Group A ===
Team	Pld	W	D	L	GF	GA	GD	Pts
Algeria	3	3	0	0	63	47	+16	6
Tunisia	3	2	0	1	62	54	+8	4
Nigeria	3	1	0	2	57	60	−3	2
Cameroon	3	0	0	3	53	74	−21	0

15 September 1985	Algeria	15–11	Tunisia	Luanda

15 September 1985	Nigeria	19–16	Cameroon	Luanda

16 September 1985	Algeria	25–15	Cameroon	Luanda

16 September 1985	Tunisia	21–17	Nigeria	Luanda

17 September 1985	Algeria	23–21	Nigeria	Luanda

18 September 1985	Tunisia	30–22	Cameroon	Luanda

=== Group B ===
Team	Pld	W	D	L	GF	GA	GD	Pts
Congo	0	0	0	0	0	0	0	0
Egypt	4	3	0	1	81	76	+5	6
Angola (H)	0	0	0	0	0	0	0	0
Ivory Coast	0	0	0	0	0	0	0	0
Senegal	0	0	0	0	0	0	0	0

(H) Hosts

14 September 1985	Angola	27–21	Ivory Coast	Luanda

15 September 1985	Egypt	23–15	Congo	Luanda

16 September 1985	Congo	28–25	Senegal	Luanda

16 September 1985	Egypt	18–17	Ivory Coast	Luanda

18 September 1985	Egypt	24–22	Senegal	Luanda

19 September 1985	Angola	22–16	Egypt	Luanda

== Knockout stage ==
Semifinals
September – Luanda
Congo
Tunisia
September – Luanda
Algeria	24
Egypt	17

Final
23 September – Luanda
Tunisia	17
Algeria	23
Third place
September – Luanda
Congo	23
Egypt	20

=== Semifinals ===
21 September 1985	Congo	17–19	Tunisia	Luanda

21 September 1985	Algeria	24–17	Egypt	Luanda

=== Third place game ===
23 September 1985	Congo	23–20	Egypt	Luanda

=== Final ===
23 September 1985	Tunisia	17–23	Algeria	Luanda

== Final ranking ==
Team qualified for the 1986 World Championship
Team qualified for the 1987 World Men's Handball Championship Group B

Rank	Team
Gold medal	Algeria
Silver medal	Tunisia
Bronze medal	Congo
4	Egypt
5	Angola
6	Ivory Coast
7	Nigeria
8	Cameroon
9	Senegal
