= 1979 African Men's Handball Championship =

1979 African Men's Championship
Marien N'Gouabi Cup

Tournament details
- Host country: Congo
- Venue(s): 1 (in 1 host city)
- Dates: 20–31 July
- Teams: 9 (from 1 confederation)

Final positions
- Champions: Tunisia (3rd title)
- Runner-up: Egypt
- Third place: Algeria
- Fourth place: Congo

The 1979 African Men's Handball Championship was the third edition of the African Men's Handball Championship, held in Brazzaville, People's Republic of the Congo, from 20 to 31 July 1979. The competition is held every two years. It acted as the African qualifying tournament for the 1980 Summer Olympics in Moscow.

In the final, Tunisia win their third title to beat Egypt in the final game.

== Qualified teams ==
- Algeria
- Angola
- Cameroon
- Congo (hosts)
- Egypt
- Ivory Coast
- Nigeria
- Togo
- Tunisia
- Madagascar (withdrew)

== Group stage ==
All times are local (UTC+1).

Team advance to the knockout stage

=== Group A ===
Team	Pld	W	D	L	GF	GA	GD	Pts
Egypt	0	0	0	0	0	0	0	0
Algeria	3	3	0	0	103	61	+42	6
Angola	0	0	0	0	0	0	0	0
Cameroon	0	0	0	0	0	0	0	0
Togo	0	0	0	0	0	0	0	0

Algeria	43–15	Angola	Brazzaville

Algeria	31–24	Cameroon	Brazzaville

Algeria	29–22	Togo	Brazzaville

=== Group B ===
Team	Pld	W	D	L	GF	GA	GD	Pts
Tunisia	0	0	0	0	0	0	0	0
Congo (H)	0	0	0	0	0	0	0	0
Ivory Coast	0	0	0	0	0	0	0	0
Nigeria	0	0	0	0	0	0	0	0
Madagascar (W)	0	0	0	0	0	0	0	0

(H) Hosts; (W) Withdrew

== Knockout stage ==
Semifinals
29 July – Brazzaville
Egypt
Congo
29 July – Brazzaville
Tunisia	23
Algeria	18

Final
31 July – Brazzaville
Egypt	15
Tunisia	21
Third place
30 July – Brazzaville
Congo	24
Algeria	26

=== Semifinals ===
29 July 1979	Egypt	–	Congo	Brazzaville

29 July 1979	Tunisia	23–18	Algeria	Brazzaville

=== Third place game ===
30 July 1979	Congo	24–26	Algeria	Brazzaville

=== Final ===
30 July 1979	Egypt	15–21	Tunisia	Brazzaville
30 July 1979		(8–11)		Brazzaville

== Final ranking ==
Tunisia qualified for Olympic tournament 1980 but refused to play, and Egypt apparently too. So Algeria took their place.

Team qualified for the 1980 Summer Olympics

Rank	Team
Gold medal	Tunisia
Silver medal	Egypt
Bronze medal	Algeria
4	Congo
5	Cameroon
6	Togo
7	Ivory Coast
8	Nigeria
9	Angola
