= 2002 African Men's Handball Championship =

15th African men's handball championship

2002 African Men's Championship
Tournament details
- Host country: Morocco
- Venue(s): 2 (in 2 host cities)
- Dates: 19–28 April
- Teams: 12 (from 1 confederation)

Final positions
- Champions: Tunisia (6th title)
- Runner-up: Algeria
- Third place: Egypt
- Fourth place: Morocco

Tournament statistics
- Matches played: 28
- Goals scored: 1,315 (46.96 per match)

The 2002 African Men's Handball Championship was the 15th edition of the African Men's Handball Championship, held in Casablanca and Rabat, Morocco, from 19 to 28 April 2002. It acted as the African qualifying tournament for the 2003 World Championship in Portugal.

Tunisia win their sixth title beating Algeria in the final game 25–22.

== Qualified teams ==
- Algeria
- Angola
- Cameroon
- Congo
- DR Congo
- Egypt
- Gabon
- Ivory Coast
- Morocco (hosts)
- Nigeria
- Senegal
- Tunisia

== Venues ==
Casablanca	2002 African Men's Handball Championship is located in Morocco	Rabat
Salle Mohammed V	2002 African Men's Handball Championship is located in Morocco	Salle Moulay Abdellah
Capacity: 12,000	2002 African Men's Handball Championship is located in Morocco	Capacity: 10,000

== Group stage ==
Team advance to the knockout stage

=== Group A ===
Team	Pld	W	D	L	GF	GA	GD	Pts
Morocco (H)	2	2	0	0	74	41	+33	4
DR Congo	2	1	0	1	51	61	−10	2
Congo	2	0	0	2	43	70	−27	0

(H) Hosts

19 April 2002	Morocco	36–23	DR Congo
19 April 2002		(22–9)

21 April 2002	Congo	25–28	DR Congo
21 April 2002		(16–10)

22 April 2002	Morocco	38–18	Congo
22 April 2002		(17–9)

=== Group B ===
Team	Pld	W	D	L	GF	GA	GD	Pts
Algeria	2	2	0	0	61	45	+16	4
Angola	2	1	0	1	57	57	0	2
Ivory Coast	2	0	0	2	44	60	−16	0

20 April 2002	Algeria	34–24	Angola
20 April 2002		(16–11)

21 April 2002	Ivory Coast	23–33	Angola
21 April 2002		(12–13)

22 April 2002	Algeria	27–21	Ivory Coast
22 April 2002		(14–7)

=== Group C ===
Team	Pld	W	D	L	GF	GA	GD	Pts
Egypt	2	2	0	0	62	45	+17	4
Nigeria	2	1	0	1	55	55	0	2
Senegal	2	0	0	2	51	68	−17	0

20 April 2002	Egypt	37–21	Senegal
20 April 2002		(17–10)

21 April 2002	Nigeria	31–30	Senegal
21 April 2002		(15–14)

22 April 2002	Egypt	25–24	Nigeria
22 April 2002		(13–11)

=== Group D ===
Team	Pld	W	D	L	GF	GA	GD	Pts
Tunisia	2	2	0	0	63	32	+31	4
Cameroon	2	1	0	1	55	55	0	2
Gabon	2	0	0	2	51	68	−17	0

20 April 2002	Tunisia	36–13	Gabon
20 April 2002		(17–5)

21 April 2002	Cameroon	27–22	Gabon
21 April 2002		(13–10)

22 April 2002	Tunisia	27–19	Cameroon
22 April 2002		(12–9)

== Knockout stage ==
Quarterfinals
24 April –
Morocco	31
Angola	17
24 April –
Algeria	25
DR Congo	15
24 April –
Egypt	26
Cameroon	11
24 April –
Tunisia	29
Nigeria	19

Semifinals
26 April –
Morocco	18
Algeria	19
26 April –
Egypt	19
Tunisia	25

Final
28 April – Casablanca
Algeria	19
Tunisia	25
Third place
27 April –
Morocco	25
Egypt	35

5th place bracket

5–8th place semifinals
27 April –
Cameroon	28
Nigeria	25
27 April –
Angola	32
DR Congo	28

Fifth place
28 April –
Cameroon	31
Angola	30
Seventh place
28 April –
Nigeria (w/o)	–
DR Congo	–

9th place bracket

9–12th place semifinals
25 April –
Senegal	29
Gabon	20
25 April –
Ivory Coast	23
Congo	19

Ninth place
26 April –
Senegal	31
Ivory Coast	19
Eleventh place
26 April –
Gabon	–
Congo (w/o)	–

=== Quarterfinals ===
24 April 2002	Algeria	25–15	DR Congo
24 April 2002		(10–9)

24 April 2002	Tunisia	29–19	Nigeria
24 April 2002		(18–9)

24 April 2002	Egypt	26–11	Cameroon
24 April 2002		(11–5)

24 April 2002	Morocco	31–17	Angola
24 April 2002		(16–7)

=== 9–12th place semifinals ===
25 April 2002	Senegal	29–20	Gabon
25 April 2002		(16–7)

25 April 2002	Ivory Coast	23–19	Congo
25 April 2002		(12–9)

=== 5–8th place semifinals ===
27 April 2002	Angola	32–28	DR Congo
27 April 2002		(21–10)

27 April 2002	Cameroon	28–25	Nigeria
27 April 2002		(12–14)

=== Semifinals ===
26 April 2002	Tunisia	25–19	Egypt
26 April 2002		(12–10)

26 April 2002	Algeria	19–18	Morocco
26 April 2002		(9–9)

=== Eleventh place game ===
26 April 2002	Congo	Walkover	Gabon

Gabon withdrew.

=== Ninth place game ===
26 April 2002	Senegal	31–19	Ivory Coast
26 April 2002		(15–10)

=== Seventh place game ===
28 April 2002	Nigeria	Walkover	DR Congo

Congo withdrew.

=== Fifth place game ===
28 April 2002	Cameroon	31–30	Angola
28 April 2002		(12–14)

=== Third place game ===
27 April 2002	Egypt	35–25	Morocco
27 April 2002		(18–12)

=== Final ===
28 April 2002	Tunisia	25–19	Algeria
28 April 2002		(13–12)

== Final ranking ==
Qualified for the 2003 World Championship

Rank	Team
Gold medal	Tunisia
Silver medal	Algeria
Bronze medal	Egypt
4	Morocco
5	Cameroon
6	Angola
7	Nigeria
8	DR Congo
9	Senegal
10	Ivory Coast
11	Congo
12	Gabon
