= 1983 African Men's Handball Championship =

1983 African Men's Championship
Tournament details
- Host country: Egypt
- Venue: 1 (in 1 host city)
- Dates: 22–31 July
- Teams: 10 (from 1 confederation)

Final positions
- Champions: Algeria (2nd title)
- Runners-up: Congo
- Third place: Tunisia
- Fourth place: Egypt

The 1983 African Men's Handball Championship was the fifth edition of the African Men's Handball Championship, held from 22 to 31 July 1983 at the Cairo International Stadium and the Police Arena in Cairo, Egypt.

It acted as the African qualifying tournament for the 1984 Summer Olympics in Los Angeles.

In the final, Algeria win their second consecutive title beating Congo in the final game.

== Qualified teams ==
- Algeria
- Cameroon
- Congo
- Egypt (hosts)
- Senegal
- Tunisia
- Morocco
- Angola
- Ivory Coast
- Nigeria

== Draw ==
Group A	Group B
Algeria; Egypt; Morocco; Nigeria; Senegal	Angola; Cameroon; Congo; Ivory Coast; Tunisia

== Group stage ==
=== Group A ===
Team	Pld	W	D	L	GF	GA	GD	Pts
Algeria (A)	4	4	0	0	0	0	0	8
Egypt (A, H)	4	3	0	1	0	0	0	6
Senegal	4	2	0	2	0	0	0	4
Morocco	4	1	0	3	0	0	0	2
Nigeria	4	0	0	4	0	0	0	0

(A) Advanced to semi-finals; (H) Hosts

22 July 1983	Egypt	24–23	Morocco

23 July 1983	Morocco	v	Nigeria

23 July 1983	Algeria	17–14	Senegal

24 July 1983	Algeria	18–14	Morocco

24 July 1983	Egypt	v	Senegal

26 July 1983	Senegal	21–18	Morocco
26 July 1983		(10–12)

26 July 1983	Egypt	20–16	Nigeria
26 July 1983		(9–8)

27 July 1983	Algeria	29–23	Nigeria
27 July 1983		(17–11)

28 July 1983	Senegal	32–23	Nigeria
28 July 1983		(15–13)

28 July 1983	Algeria	25–23	Egypt
28 July 1983		(11–8)

=== Group B ===
Team	Pld	W	D	L	GF	GA	GD	Pts
Congo (A)	4	3	1	0	0	0	0	7
Tunisia (A)	4	3	0	1	0	0	0	6
Cameroon	4	2	0	2	0	0	0	4
Ivory Coast	4	1	0	3	0	0	0	2
Angola	4	0	1	3	0	0	0	1

(A) Advance to semi-finals

23 July 1983	Cameroon	22–20	Angola
23 July 1983		(11–9)

23 July 1983	Congo	v	Ivory Coast

24 July 1983	Cameroon	v	Ivory Coast

24 July 1983	Congo	v	Tunisia

26 July 1983	Congo	23–16	Cameroon
26 July 1983		(8–9)

26 July 1983	Tunisia	22–20	Angola
26 July 1983		(10–10)

27 July 1983	Tunisia	21–17	Cameroon
27 July 1983		(11–10)

27 July 1983	Ivory Coast	27–25	Angola
27 July 1983		(11–10)

28 July 1983	Congo	17–17	Angola
28 July 1983		(12–10)

28 July 1983	Tunisia	28–18	Ivory Coast
28 July 1983		(10–9)

== Knockout stage ==
=== Bracket ===
Semi-finals
Algeria	19
Tunisia	17
Congo	14
Egypt	13

Final
Algeria	25
Congo	24
Third place
Tunisia	29
Egypt	24

=== Semi-finals ===
29 July 1983	Algeria	19–17	Tunisia

29 July 1983	Congo	14-13	Egypt

=== Third place game ===
30 July 1983	Tunisia	29–24	Egypt	Cairo

=== Final ===
31 July 1983	Algeria	25–24	Congo	Cairo

== Final ranking ==
Team qualified for the 1984 Summer Olympics
Team qualified for the 1985 World Men's Handball Championship Group B

Rank	Team
Gold medal	Algeria
Silver medal	Congo
Bronze medal	Tunisia
4	Egypt
5	Cameroon
6	Senegal
