= 2010 African Men's Handball Championship =

2010 African Championship

Tournament details
- Host country: Egypt
- Venues: 3 (in 2 host cities)
- Dates: 10–20 February
- Teams: 12 (from 1 confederation)

Final positions
- Champions: Tunisia (8th title)
- Runners-up: Egypt
- Third place: Algeria
- Fourth place: DR Congo

Tournament statistics
- Matches played: 35
- Goals scored: 1,824 (52.11 per match)
- Top scorers: Ahmed El-Ahmar (EGY) (38 goals)

Awards
- Best player: Ahmed El-Ahmar (EGY)

The 2010 African Men's Handball Championship was the 19th edition of the African Men's Handball Championship, organized by the African Handball Confederation, which acted as the qualification process for the 2011 World Men's Handball Championship. It was held in Cairo and Suez Egypt between 10 and 21 February 2010.

== Teams ==
Group A	Group B	Group C
Tunisia; DR Congo; Nigeria; Libya	Egypt; Angola; Gabon; Cameroon	Algeria; Morocco; Congo; Ivory Coast

== Venues ==
Cairo
Cairo Stadium Indoor Halls Complex
Grand Hall	Middle Hall
Capacity: 16,900	Capacity: 1,620
Suez	2010 African Men's Handball Championship is located in Egypt
Nasr Hall	2010 African Men's Handball Championship is located in Egypt
Capacity: 2,300	2010 African Men's Handball Championship is located in Egypt

== Preliminary round ==
All times are local (UTC+2).

=== Group A ===
Team	Pld	W	D	L	GF	GA	GD	Pts
Tunisia	3	3	0	0	112	66	+46	6
DR Congo	3	1	1	1	75	81	−6	3
Nigeria	3	1	1	1	77	87	−10	3
Libya	3	0	0	3	69	99	−30	0

11 February 2010; 15:00	DR Congo	27–27	Nigeria	Nasr Hall, Suez
11 February 2010; 15:00		(12–11)		Nasr Hall, Suez
11 February 2010; 15:00		Report		Nasr Hall, Suez

11 February 2010; 17:00	Tunisia	43–24	Libya	Nasr Hall, Suez
11 February 2010; 17:00		(24–12)		Nasr Hall, Suez
11 February 2010; 17:00		Report		Nasr Hall, Suez

12 February 2010; 14:00	Libya	27–30	Nigeria	Nasr Hall, Suez
12 February 2010; 14:00		(11–12)		Nasr Hall, Suez
12 February 2010; 14:00		Report		Nasr Hall, Suez

12 February 2010; 20:00	DR Congo	22–36	Tunisia	Nasr Hall, Suez
12 February 2010; 20:00		(8–19)		Nasr Hall, Suez
12 February 2010; 20:00		Report		Nasr Hall, Suez

13 February 2010; 14:00	Libya	18–26	DR Congo	Nasr Hall, Suez
13 February 2010; 14:00		(10–14)		Nasr Hall, Suez
13 February 2010; 14:00		Report		Nasr Hall, Suez

13 February 2010; 20:00	Nigeria	20–33	Tunisia	Nasr Hall, Suez
13 February 2010; 20:00		(10–15)		Nasr Hall, Suez
13 February 2010; 20:00		Report		Nasr Hall, Suez

=== Group B ===
Team	Pld	W	D	L	GF	GA	GD	Pts
Egypt (H)	3	3	0	0	85	58	+27	6
Angola	3	2	0	1	72	75	−3	4
Gabon	3	0	1	2	79	87	−8	1
Cameroon	3	0	1	2	72	88	−16	1

(H) Hosts

11 February 2010; 14:00	Angola	25–22	Cameroon	Indoor Grand Hall, Cairo
11 February 2010; 14:00		(11–8)		Indoor Grand Hall, Cairo
11 February 2010; 14:00		Report		Indoor Grand Hall, Cairo

11 February 2010; 20:00	Egypt	27–21	Gabon	Indoor Grand Hall, Cairo
11 February 2010; 20:00		(12–12)		Indoor Grand Hall, Cairo
11 February 2010; 20:00		Report		Indoor Grand Hall, Cairo

12 February 2010; 18:00	Gabon	25–27	Angola	Indoor Grand Hall, Cairo
12 February 2010; 18:00		(10–13)		Indoor Grand Hall, Cairo
12 February 2010; 18:00		Report		Indoor Grand Hall, Cairo

12 February 2010; 20:00	Cameroon	17–30	Egypt	Indoor Grand Hall, Cairo
12 February 2010; 20:00		(10–19)		Indoor Grand Hall, Cairo
12 February 2010; 20:00		Report		Indoor Grand Hall, Cairo

13 February 2010; 18:00	Cameroon	33–33	Gabon	Indoor Grand Hall, Cairo
13 February 2010; 18:00		(17–17)		Indoor Grand Hall, Cairo
13 February 2010; 18:00		Report		Indoor Grand Hall, Cairo

13 February 2010; 20:00	Egypt	28–20	Angola	Indoor Grand Hall, Cairo
13 February 2010; 20:00		(13–11)		Indoor Grand Hall, Cairo
13 February 2010; 20:00		Report		Indoor Grand Hall, Cairo

=== Group C ===
Team	Pld	W	D	L	GF	GA	GD	Pts
Algeria	3	3	0	0	95	40	+55	6
Morocco	3	2	0	1	75	82	−7	4
Congo	3	1	0	2	59	78	−19	2
Ivory Coast	3	0	0	3	54	83	−29	0

11 February 2010; 15:00	Ivory Coast	11–29	Algeria	Indoor Middle Hall, Cairo
11 February 2010; 15:00		(4–17)		Indoor Middle Hall, Cairo
11 February 2010; 15:00		Report		Indoor Middle Hall, Cairo

11 February 2010; 16:00	Congo	24–27	Morocco	Indoor Middle Hall, Cairo
11 February 2010; 16:00		(11–14)		Indoor Middle Hall, Cairo
11 February 2010; 16:00		Report		Indoor Middle Hall, Cairo

12 February 2010; 14:00	Congo	13–31	Algeria	Indoor Middle Hall, Cairo
12 February 2010; 14:00		(5–17)		Indoor Middle Hall, Cairo
12 February 2010; 14:00		Report		Indoor Middle Hall, Cairo

12 February 2010; 18:00	Ivory Coast	23–32	Morocco	Indoor Middle Hall, Cairo
12 February 2010; 18:00		(12–18)		Indoor Middle Hall, Cairo
12 February 2010; 18:00		Report		Indoor Middle Hall, Cairo

13 February 2010; 16:00	Morocco	16–35	Algeria	Indoor Middle Hall, Cairo
13 February 2010; 16:00		(10–15)		Indoor Middle Hall, Cairo
13 February 2010; 16:00		Report		Indoor Middle Hall, Cairo

13 February 2010; 18:00	Ivory Coast	20–22	Congo	Indoor Middle Hall, Cairo
13 February 2010; 18:00		(11–10)		Indoor Middle Hall, Cairo
13 February 2010; 18:00		Report		Indoor Middle Hall, Cairo

== Main round ==
=== Group D ===
Team	Pld	W	D	L	GF	GA	GD	Pts
Tunisia	2	1	1	0	54	42	+12	3
Algeria	2	1	1	0	47	40	+7	3
Angola	2	0	0	2	40	59	−19	0

15 February 2010; 18:00	Tunisia	33–21	Angola	Indoor Grand Hall, Cairo
15 February 2010; 18:00		(15–9)		Indoor Grand Hall, Cairo
15 February 2010; 18:00		Report		Indoor Grand Hall, Cairo

16 February 2010; 16:00	Angola	19–26	Algeria	Indoor Middle Hall, Cairo
16 February 2010; 16:00		(11–12)		Indoor Middle Hall, Cairo
16 February 2010; 16:00		Report		Indoor Middle Hall, Cairo

17 February 2010; 18:30	Algeria	21–21	Tunisia	Indoor Middle Hall, Cairo
17 February 2010; 18:30		(7–11)		Indoor Middle Hall, Cairo
17 February 2010; 18:30		Report		Indoor Middle Hall, Cairo

=== Group E ===
Team	Pld	W	D	L	GF	GA	GD	Pts
Egypt (H)	2	2	0	0	76	38	+38	4
DR Congo	2	1	0	1	47	60	−13	2
Morocco	2	0	0	2	49	74	−25	0

(H) Hosts

15 February 2010; 20:00	DR Congo	17–32	Egypt	Indoor Grand Hall, Cairo
15 February 2010; 20:00		(9–17)		Indoor Grand Hall, Cairo
15 February 2010; 20:00		Report		Indoor Grand Hall, Cairo

16 February 2010; 20:00	Egypt	44–21	Morocco	Indoor Grand Hall, Cairo
16 February 2010; 20:00		(23–8)		Indoor Grand Hall, Cairo
16 February 2010; 20:00		Report		Indoor Grand Hall, Cairo

17 February 2010; 16:30	Morocco	28–30	DR Congo	Indoor Grand Hall, Cairo
17 February 2010; 16:30		(11–14)		Indoor Grand Hall, Cairo
17 February 2010; 16:30		Report		Indoor Grand Hall, Cairo

== Ranking round ==
=== Group F ===
Team	Pld	W	D	L	GF	GA	GD	Pts
Nigeria	2	1	0	1	64	56	+8	2
Congo	2	1	0	1	61	62	−1	2
Gabon	2	1	0	1	57	64	−7	2

15 February 2010; 17:00	Nigeria	30–31	Congo	Nasr Hall, Suez
15 February 2010; 17:00		(17–13)		Nasr Hall, Suez
15 February 2010; 17:00		Report		Nasr Hall, Suez

16 February 2010; 17:00	Gabon	32–30	Congo	Nasr Hall, Suez
16 February 2010; 17:00		(15–11)		Nasr Hall, Suez
16 February 2010; 17:00		Report		Nasr Hall, Suez

17 February 2010; 17:00	Nigeria	34–25	Gabon	Nasr Hall, Suez
17 February 2010; 17:00		(21–12)		Nasr Hall, Suez
17 February 2010; 17:00		Report		Nasr Hall, Suez

=== Group G ===
Team	Pld	W	D	L	GF	GA	GD	Pts
Cameroon	2	2	0	0	58	48	+10	4
Libya	2	1	0	1	53	50	+3	2
Ivory Coast	2	0	0	2	44	57	−13	0

15 February 2010; 15:00	Libya	27–22	Ivory Coast	Nasr Hall, Suez
15 February 2010; 15:00		(10–10)		Nasr Hall, Suez
15 February 2010; 15:00		Report		Nasr Hall, Suez

16 February 2010; 15:00	Cameroon	30–22	Ivory Coast	Nasr Hall, Suez
16 February 2010; 15:00		(15–6)		Nasr Hall, Suez
16 February 2010; 15:00		Report		Nasr Hall, Suez

17 February 2010; 15:00	Libya	26–28	Cameroon	Nasr Hall, Suez
17 February 2010; 15:00		(13–10)		Nasr Hall, Suez
17 February 2010; 15:00		Report		Nasr Hall, Suez

== Final round ==
Semifinal
February 19 – Cairo
Tunisia	37
DR Congo	22
February 19 – Cairo
Algeria	24
Egypt	26

Final
February 20 – Cairo
Tunisia	24
Egypt	21
Third place
February 20 – Cairo
DR Congo	22
Algeria	30

=== Semifinals ===
19 February 2010; 17:00	Tunisia	37–22	DR Congo	Indoor Grand Hall, Cairo
19 February 2010; 17:00		(20–8)		Indoor Grand Hall, Cairo
19 February 2010; 17:00		Report		Indoor Grand Hall, Cairo

19 February 2010; 19:30	Algeria	24–26	Egypt	Indoor Grand Hall, Cairo
19 February 2010; 19:30		(13–11)		Indoor Grand Hall, Cairo
19 February 2010; 19:30		Report		Indoor Grand Hall, Cairo

=== Fifth place game ===
19 February 2010; 14:30	Angola	30–24	Morocco	Indoor Middle Hall, Cairo
19 February 2010; 14:30		(17–10)		Indoor Middle Hall, Cairo
19 February 2010; 14:30		Report		Indoor Middle Hall, Cairo

=== Third place game ===
20 February 2010; 14:30	DR Congo	22–30	Algeria	Indoor Grand Hall, Cairo
20 February 2010; 14:30		(10–15)		Indoor Grand Hall, Cairo
20 February 2010; 14:30		Report		Indoor Grand Hall, Cairo

=== Final ===
20 February 2010; 19:30	Tunisia	24–21	Egypt	Indoor Grand Hall, Cairo
20 February 2010; 19:30		(14–12)		Indoor Grand Hall, Cairo
20 February 2010; 19:30		Report		Indoor Grand Hall, Cairo

== Final standings ==
Qualified for the 2011 World Championship

Rank	Team	Record
Gold medal	Tunisia	6–1–0
Silver medal	Egypt	6–0–1
Bronze medal	Algeria	5–1–1
4	DR Congo	2–1–4
5	Angola	3–0–4
6	Morocco	3–0–4
7	Nigeria	2–1–2
8	Congo	2–0–3
9	Gabon	1–1–3
10	Cameroon	2–1–2
11	Libya	1–0–4
12	Ivory Coast	0–0–5

== Awards ==
2010 African Handball Championship

Tunisia
8th title

Best Player

== See also ==
2010 African Handball Champions League
