= 1974 African Men's Handball Championship =

1974 African Championship
Tournament details
- Host country: Tunisia
- Venue(s): 1 (in 1 host city)
- Dates: 1974
- Teams: 5 (from 1 confederation)

Final positions
- Champions: Tunisia (1st title)
- Runner-up: Cameroon
- Third place: Senegal
- Fourth place: Togo

The 1974 African Men's Handball Championship was the first edition of the African Men's Handball Championship, which took place in 1974, in Tunis, Tunisia. The host Tunisia won the tournament.

Note that a women's tournament of the African Women's Handball Championship is organized in parallel.

== Qualified teams ==
- Cameroon
- Central African Republic
- Egypt (disqualified)
- Senegal
- Togo
- Tunisia (hosts)

== Venue ==
- El Menzah Sports Palace, Tunis

== Final standing ==
Rank	Team
1st place, gold medalist(s)	Tunisia
2nd place, silver medalist(s)	Cameroon
3rd place, bronze medalist(s)	Senegal
4	Togo
5	Central African Republic
