= 1987 African Men's Handball Championship =

1987 African Men's Championship
Tournament details
- Host country: Morocco
- Venue: 1 (in 1 host city)
- Dates: 3–12 July
- Teams: 8 (from 1 confederation)

Final positions
- Champions: Algeria (4th title)
- Runners-up: Egypt
- Third place: Tunisia
- Fourth place: Congo

The 1987 African Men's Handball Championship was the seventh edition of the African Men's Handball Championship, held in Rabat, Morocco, from 3 to 12 July 1987. It acted as the African qualifying tournament for the 1988 Summer Olympics in Seoul.

In the final, Algeria win their fourth consecutive title beating Egypt in the final game.

== Qualified teams ==
- Algeria
- Angola
- Congo
- Egypt
- Ivory Coast
- Morocco (hosts)
- Senegal
- Tunisia

== Group stage ==
Team advance to the knockout stage

=== Group A ===
Team	Pld	W	D	L	GF	GA	GD	Pts
Algeria	3	3	0	0	78	55	+23	6
Egypt	0	0	0	0	0	0	0	0
Ivory Coast	0	0	0	0	0	0	0	0
Morocco (H)	0	0	0	0	0	0	0	0

(H) Hosts

3 July 1987	Algeria	23–16	Morocco	Rabat
3 July 1987		(11–7)		Rabat

5 July 1987	Algeria	22–12	Egypt	Rabat

7 July 1987	Algeria	33–27	Ivory Coast	Rabat

=== Group B ===
Team	Pld	W	D	L	GF	GA	GD	Pts
Congo	0	0	0	0	0	0	0	0
Tunisia	0	0	0	0	0	0	0	0
Angola	0	0	0	0	0	0	0	0
Senegal	0	0	0	0	0	0	0	0

== Knockout stage ==
Semifinals
July – Rabat
Algeria	16
Tunisia	15
July – Rabat
Congo
Egypt

Final
12 July – Rabat
Algeria	22
Egypt	16
Third place
July – Rabat
Tunisia	21
Congo	16

=== Semifinals ===
Algeria	16–15	Tunisia	Rabat

Congo	–	Egypt	Rabat

=== Third place game ===
Tunisia	21–16	Congo	Rabat

=== Final ===
12 July 1987	Algeria	22–16	Egypt	Rabat

== Final ranking ==
Team qualified for the 1988 Summer Olympics
Team qualified for the 1989 World Men's Handball Championship Group B

Rank	Team
Gold medal	Algeria
Silver medal	Egypt
Bronze medal	Tunisia
4	Congo
5	Angola
6	Ivory Coast
7	Senegal
8	Morocco
