= 1989 African Men's Handball Championship =

1989 African Men's Championship
Tournament details
- Host country: Algeria
- Venue: 1 (in 1 host city)
- Dates: 17–27 July
- Teams: 7 (from 1 confederation)

Final positions
- Champions: Algeria (5th title)
- Runners-up: Egypt
- Third place: Tunisia
- Fourth place: Congo

The 1989 African Men's Handball Championship was the eighth edition of the African Men's Handball Championship, held in Algiers, Algeria, from 17 to 27 July 1989. It acted as the African qualifying tournament for the 1990 World Championship in Czechoslovakia.

In the final, Algeria win their fifth consecutive title beating Egypt in the final game 18–17.

== Qualified teams ==
- Algeria (hosts)
- Angola
- Congo
- Egypt
- Ivory Coast
- Morocco
- Tunisia

== Group stage ==
Team advance to the knockout stage

=== Group A ===
Team	Pld	W	D	L	GF	GA	GD	Pts
Algeria (H)	3	3	0	0	66	50	+16	6
Tunisia	0	0	0	0	0	0	0	0
Morocco	0	0	0	0	0	0	0	0
Angola	0	0	0	0	0	0	0	0

(H) Hosts

17 July 1989	Algeria	19–11	Morocco	Harcha Arena, Algiers

19 July 1989	Algeria	18–16	Tunisia	Harcha Arena, Algiers

21 July 1989	Algeria	29–23	Angola	Harcha Arena, Algiers

=== Group B ===
Team	Pld	W	D	L	GF	GA	GD	Pts
Egypt	0	0	0	0	0	0	0	0
Congo	0	0	0	0	0	0	0	0
Ivory Coast	0	0	0	0	0	0	0	0

== Knockout stage ==
Semifinals
July – Algiers
Algeria	18
Congo	13
July – Algiers
Egypt	21
Tunisia	20

Final
27 July – Algiers
Algeria	18
Egypt	17
Third place
July – Algiers
Congo	18
Tunisia	19

=== Semifinals ===
Algeria	18–13	Congo	Harcha Arena, Algiers

Egypt	21–20	Tunisia	Harcha Arena, Algiers

=== Third place game ===
Congo	18–19	Tunisia	Harcha Arena, Algiers

=== Final ===
27 July 1989	Algeria	18–17	Egypt	Harcha Arena, Algiers; Attendance: 8 000

== Final ranking ==
Team qualified for the 1990 World Championship

Rank	Team
Gold medal	Algeria
Silver medal	Egypt
Bronze medal	Tunisia
4	Congo
5	Morocco
6	Ivory Coast
7	Angola
