= 2020 African Men's Handball Championship =

Tournament details
- Host country: Tunisia
- Venue(s): 3 (in 3 host cities)
- Dates: 16–26 January
- Teams: 16 (from 1 confederation)

Final positions
- Champions: Egypt (7th title)
- Runners-up: Tunisia
- Third place: Algeria
- Fourth place: Angola

Tournament statistics
- Matches played: 52
- Goals scored: 2,711 (52.13 per match)

Awards
- Best player: (Egypt) Yehia El-Deraa

The 2020 African Men's Handball Championship was the 24th edition of the African Men's Handball Championship and was held from 16 to 26 January 2020 in Tunisia. It acted as the African qualifying tournament for the 2020 Summer Olympics in Tokyo and 2021 World Men's Handball Championship in Egypt.

Egypt won their seventh title by defeating Tunisia 27–22 in the final.

== Qualified teams ==
Country	Previous appearances in tournament
Algeria	22 (1976, 1979, **1981**, **1983**, **1985**, **1987,** **1989**, 1991, 1992, 1994, **1996**, 1998, 2000, 2002, 2004, 2006, 2008, 2010, 2012, **2014**, 2016, 2018)
Angola	15 (1981, 1983, 1985, 1987, 1989, 1998, 2002, 2004, 2006 2008, 2010, 2012, 2014, 2016, 2018)
Cameroon	14 (1974, 1976, 1979, 1996, 1998, 2002, 2004, 2006, 2008, 2010, 2012, 2014, 2016, 2018)
Cape Verde	0 (debut)
Congo	19 (1979, 1981, 1983, 1985, 1987, 1989, 1991, 1994, 1996, 1998, 2002, 2004, 2006, 2010, 2012, 2014, 2016, 2018)
DR Congo	11 (1992, 2000, 2002, 2004, 2006, 2008, 2010, 2014, 2016, 2018)
Egypt	21 (1979, 1981, 1983, 1985, 1987, 1989, **1991**, **1992**, 1994, 1996, 1998, **2000**, 2002, **2004**, 2006, **2008**, 2010, 2012, 2014, **2016**, 2018)
Gabon	8 (2000, 2002, 2006, 2010, 2012, 2014, 2016, 2018)
Guinea	1 (1981)
Ivory Coast	16 (1976, 1979, 1981, 1983, 1985, 1987, 1989, 1991, 1992, 1994, 1996, 1998, 2002, 2006, 2010, 2012)
Kenya	2 (2004, 2016)
Libya	4 (2004, 2010, 2014, 2016)
Morocco	17 (1987, 1989, 1991, 1992, 1994, 1996, 1998, 2000, 2002, 2004, 2006, 2008, 2010, 2012, 2014, 2016, 2018)
Nigeria	11 (1979, 1981, 1996, 1998, 2002, 2006, 2008, 2010, 2014, 2016, 2018)
~~Senegal~~	9 (1974, 1976, 1991, 1992, 1994, 2002, 2004, 2012, 2014)
Tunisia	23 (**1974**, **1976**, **1979**, 1981, 1983, 1985, 1987, 1989, 1991, 1992, **1994**, 1996, **1998**, 2000, **2002**, 2004, **2006**, 2008, **2010**, **2012**, 2014, 2016, **2018**)
Zambia	0 (debut)

Note: Bold indicates champion for that year. Italic indicates host for that year.

== Venues ==
Radès	Nabeul
Salle Omnisport de Radès	Salle Bir Challouf
Capacity: 17,000	Capacity: 5,000
Hammamet	2020 African Men's Handball Championship is located in Tunisia
Hammamet Indoor Sports Hall	2020 African Men's Handball Championship is located in Tunisia
Capacity: 2,500	2020 African Men's Handball Championship is located in Tunisia

== Draw ==
The draw was held on 19 October 2019 in Tunis. Senegal withdrew before the tournament.

Pot 1	Pot 2	Pot 3	Pot 4
Tunisia; Egypt; Angola; Morocco	Algeria; Gabon; Cameroon; DR Congo	Congo; Guinea; Nigeria; Ivory Coast	~~Senegal~~; Kenya; Libya; Zambia; Cape Verde

== Match officials ==
On 13 January 2020, The African Handball Confederation (CAHB) has selected eight couples of referees.

CAHB referees
Country	Referees
Algeria	Sid-Ali Hamidi; Youcef Belkhiri
Egypt	Alaa Emam; Hossam Hedaia
Egypt	Mahmoud El Beltagy; Hamdy Nasser
Senegal	Abdoulaye Faye; Cheikh Mohamed Fadel Diop
Togo	Akpatsa Yawo Mawusse; Assignon Agbeko Kokou
Tunisia	Samir Krichen; Samir Makhlouf
Tunisia	Ramzi Khenizi; Ismaïl Boualloucha

Invited referees
Country	Referees
Spain	Ignacio Garcia; Andreu Marin

== Preliminary round ==
All times are local (UTC+1).

=== Group A ===
Pos	Team	Pld	W	D	L	GF	GA	GD	Pts	Qualification
1	Egypt	3	3	0	0	111	60	+51	6	Main round
2	DR Congo	3	2	0	1	57	53	+4	4	Main round
3	Guinea	3	1	0	2	73	84	−11	2	Placement round
4	Kenya (Note: Kenya forfeited their first game.)	3	0	0	3	36	80	−44	0	Placement round

Source: CAN 2020
Rules for classification: 1) points; 2) head-to-head points; 3) head-to-head goal difference; 4) head-to-head number of goals scored; 5) goal difference.
Notes:

16 January 2020; 12:00	DR Congo	10–0 (awarded)	Kenya	Salle Bir Challouf, Nabeul

16 January 2020; 12:00	Egypt	39–22	Guinea	Hammamet Indoor Sports Hall, Hammamet
16 January 2020; 12:00		(19–10)		Hammamet Indoor Sports Hall, Hammamet

17 January 2020; 12:00	Kenya	19–44	Egypt	Salle Omnisport de Radès, Radès
17 January 2020; 12:00		(7–21)		Salle Omnisport de Radès, Radès

17 January 2020; 16:00	Guinea	25–28	DR Congo	Hammamet Indoor Sports Hall, Hammamet
17 January 2020; 16:00		(12–16)		Hammamet Indoor Sports Hall, Hammamet

19 January 2020; 12:00	Guinea	26–17	Kenya	Salle Omnisport de Radès, Radès
19 January 2020; 12:00		(11–10)		Salle Omnisport de Radès, Radès

19 January 2020; 18:00	Egypt	28–19	DR Congo	Hammamet Indoor Sports Hall, Hammamet
19 January 2020; 18:00		(16–10)		Hammamet Indoor Sports Hall, Hammamet

=== Group B ===
Pos	Team	Pld	W	D	L	GF	GA	GD	Pts	Qualification
1	Angola	3	3	0	0	81	69	+12	6	Main round
2	Gabon	3	1	1	1	74	77	−3	3	Main round
3	Nigeria	3	1	0	2	79	80	−1	2	Placement round
4	Libya	3	0	1	2	65	73	−8	1	Placement round

Source: CAN 2020
Rules for classification: 1) points; 2) head-to-head points; 3) head-to-head goal difference; 4) head-to-head number of goals scored; 5) goal difference.

16 January 2020; 12:00	Angola	30–24	Nigeria	Salle Omnisport de Radès, Radès
16 January 2020; 12:00		(17–10)		Salle Omnisport de Radès, Radès

16 January 2020; 14:00	Gabon	22–22	Libya	Hammamet Indoor Sports Hall, Hammamet
16 January 2020; 14:00		(12–13)		Hammamet Indoor Sports Hall, Hammamet

17 January 2020; 14:00	Libya	19–20	Angola	Salle Omnisport de Radès, Radès
17 January 2020; 14:00		(6–8)		Salle Omnisport de Radès, Radès

17 January 2020; 18:00	Nigeria	24–26	Gabon	Hammamet Indoor Sports Hall, Hammamet
17 January 2020; 18:00		(13–14)		Hammamet Indoor Sports Hall, Hammamet

19 January 2020; 16:00	Angola	31–26	Gabon	Salle Omnisport de Radès, Radès
19 January 2020; 16:00		(13–12)		Salle Omnisport de Radès, Radès

19 January 2020; 16:00	Nigeria	31–24	Libya	Hammamet Indoor Sports Hall, Hammamet
19 January 2020; 16:00		(15–11)		Hammamet Indoor Sports Hall, Hammamet

=== Group C ===
Pos	Team	Pld	W	D	L	GF	GA	GD	Pts	Qualification
1	Tunisia (H)	3	3	0	0	122	66	+56	6	Main round
2	Cape Verde	3	2	0	1	72	78	−6	4	Main round
3	Cameroon	3	1	0	2	68	82	−14	2	Placement round
4	Ivory Coast	3	0	0	3	69	105	−36	0	Placement round

Source: CAN 2020
Rules for classification: 1) points; 2) head-to-head points; 3) head-to-head goal difference; 4) head-to-head number of goals scored; 5) goal difference.
(H) Hosts

16 January 2020; 10:00	Ivory Coast	19–28	Cameroon	Salle Bir Challouf, Nabeul
16 January 2020; 10:00		(9–14)		Salle Bir Challouf, Nabeul

16 January 2020; 18:30	Tunisia	33–21	Cape Verde	Salle Omnisport de Radès, Radès
16 January 2020; 18:30		(17–9)		Salle Omnisport de Radès, Radès

17 January 2020; 14:00	Cameroon	19–22	Cape Verde	Hammamet Indoor Sports Hall, Hammamet
17 January 2020; 14:00		(12–8)		Hammamet Indoor Sports Hall, Hammamet

17 January 2020; 18:00	Tunisia	48–24	Ivory Coast	Salle Omnisport de Radès, Radès
17 January 2020; 18:00		(22–13)		Salle Omnisport de Radès, Radès

19 January 2020; 14:00	Ivory Coast	26–29	Cape Verde	Hammamet Indoor Sports Hall, Hammamet
19 January 2020; 14:00		(12–13)		Hammamet Indoor Sports Hall, Hammamet

19 January 2020; 18:00	Tunisia	41–21	Cameroon	Salle Omnisport de Radès, Radès
19 January 2020; 18:00		(22–11)		Salle Omnisport de Radès, Radès

=== Group D ===
Pos	Team	Pld	W	D	L	GF	GA	GD	Pts	Qualification
1	Algeria	3	3	0	0	98	64	+34	6	Main round
2	Morocco	3	2	0	1	103	70	+33	4	Main round
3	Congo	3	1	0	2	87	82	+5	2	Placement round
4	Zambia	3	0	0	3	38	110	−72	0	Placement round
–	Senegal	0	0	0	0	0	0	0	0	Withdrawn

Source: CAN 2020
Rules for classification: 1) points; 2) head-to-head points; 3) head-to-head goal difference; 4) head-to-head number of goals scored; 5) goal difference.

16 January 2020; 10:00	Morocco	34–25	Congo	Salle Omnisport de Radès, Radès
16 January 2020; 10:00		(20–15)		Salle Omnisport de Radès, Radès

16 January 2020; 10:00	Algeria	34–9	Zambia	Hammamet Indoor Sports Hall, Hammamet
16 January 2020; 10:00		(17–4)		Hammamet Indoor Sports Hall, Hammamet

17 January 2020; 12:00	Zambia	12–39	Morocco	Hammamet Indoor Sports Hall, Hammamet
17 January 2020; 12:00		(7–19)		Hammamet Indoor Sports Hall, Hammamet

17 January 2020; 16:00	Congo	25–31	Algeria	Salle Omnisport de Radès, Radès
17 January 2020; 16:00		(11–18)		Salle Omnisport de Radès, Radès

19 January 2020; 12:00	Congo	37–17	Zambia	Hammamet Indoor Sports Hall, Hammamet
19 January 2020; 12:00		(19–7)		Hammamet Indoor Sports Hall, Hammamet

19 January 2020; 14:00	Morocco	30–33	Algeria	Salle Omnisport de Radès, Radès
19 January 2020; 14:00		(15–16)		Salle Omnisport de Radès, Radès

== Placement round ==
Points and goals gained in the preliminary group against teams that advanced, were taken over.

=== Group 1 ===
Pos	Team	Pld	W	D	L	GF	GA	GD	Pts	Qualification
1	Guinea	3	2	1	0	72	57	+15	5	Ninth place game
2	Nigeria	3	2	0	1	85	68	+17	4	Eleventh place game
3	Libya	3	1	1	1	67	73	−6	3	13th place game
4	Kenya	3	0	0	3	57	83	−26	0	15th place game

Source: CAN 2020
Rules for classification: 1) points; 2) head-to-head points; 3) head-to-head goal difference; 4) head-to-head number of goals scored; 5) Goal difference.

20 January 2020; 12:00	Kenya	26–27	Libya	Hammamet Indoor Sports Hall, Hammamet
20 January 2020; 12:00		(12–10)		Hammamet Indoor Sports Hall, Hammamet

20 January 2020; 16:00	Guinea	30–24	Nigeria	Hammamet Indoor Sports Hall, Hammamet
20 January 2020; 16:00		(16–11)		Hammamet Indoor Sports Hall, Hammamet

22 January 2020; 12:00	Kenya	14–30	Nigeria	Hammamet Indoor Sports Hall, Hammamet
22 January 2020; 12:00		(6–15)		Hammamet Indoor Sports Hall, Hammamet

22 January 2020; 16:00	Libya	16–16	Guinea	Hammamet Indoor Sports Hall, Hammamet
22 January 2020; 16:00		(9–7)		Hammamet Indoor Sports Hall, Hammamet

=== Group 2 ===
Pos	Team	Pld	W	D	L	GF	GA	GD	Pts	Qualification
1	Congo	3	2	1	0	95	76	+19	5	Ninth place game
2	Cameroon	3	2	0	1	63	43	+20	4	Eleventh place game
3	Ivory Coast	3	1	1	1	92	86	+6	3	13th place game
4	Zambia (Note: Zambia forfeited their game against Cameroon.)	3	0	0	3	41	86	−45	0	15th place game

Source: CAN 2020
Rules for classification: 1) points; 2) head-to-head points; 3) head-to-head goal difference; 4) head-to-head number of goals scored; 5) Goal difference.
Notes:

20 January 2020; 14:00	Ivory Coast	39–24	Zambia	Hammamet Indoor Sports Hall, Hammamet
20 January 2020; 14:00		(20–14)		Hammamet Indoor Sports Hall, Hammamet

20 January 2020; 18:00	Cameroon	24–25	Congo	Hammamet Indoor Sports Hall, Hammamet
20 January 2020; 18:00		(12–11)		Hammamet Indoor Sports Hall, Hammamet

22 January 2020; 14:00	Ivory Coast	34–34	Congo	Hammamet Indoor Sports Hall, Hammamet
22 January 2020; 14:00		(16–19)		Hammamet Indoor Sports Hall, Hammamet

22 January 2020; 18:00	Cameroon	10–0 (forfeit)	Zambia	Hammamet Indoor Sports Hall, Hammamet

=== 15th place game ===
24 January 2020; 12:00	Kenya	28–17	Zambia	Hammamet Indoor Sports Hall, Hammamet
24 January 2020; 12:00		(12–11)		Hammamet Indoor Sports Hall, Hammamet

=== 13th place game ===
24 January 2020; 14:00	Libya	32–25	Ivory Coast	Hammamet Indoor Sports Hall, Hammamet
24 January 2020; 14:00		(13–12)		Hammamet Indoor Sports Hall, Hammamet

=== Eleventh place game ===
24 January 2020; 16:00	Nigeria	33–29	Cameroon	Hammamet Indoor Sports Hall, Hammamet
24 January 2020; 16:00		(17–17)		Hammamet Indoor Sports Hall, Hammamet

=== Ninth place game ===
25 January 2020; 18:00	Guinea	23–25	Congo	Hammamet Indoor Sports Hall, Hammamet
25 January 2020; 18:00		(11–12)		Hammamet Indoor Sports Hall, Hammamet

== Main round ==
Points and goals gained in the preliminary group against teams that advanced, were taken over.

=== Group I ===
Pos	Team	Pld	W	D	L	GF	GA	GD	Pts	Qualification
1	Egypt	3	3	0	0	97	62	+35	6	Semifinals
2	Angola	3	2	0	1	87	84	+3	4	Semifinals
3	DR Congo	3	1	0	2	76	76	0	2	5–8th place semifinals
4	Gabon	3	0	0	3	61	99	−38	0	5–8th place semifinals

Source: CAN 2020
Rules for classification: 1) points; 2) head-to-head points; 3) head-to-head goal difference; 4) head-to-head number of goals scored; 5) Goal difference.

20 January 2020; 12:00	Egypt	36–17	Gabon	Salle Omnisport de Radès, Radès
20 January 2020; 12:00		(20–7)		Salle Omnisport de Radès, Radès

20 January 2020; 14:00	Angola	30–25	DR Congo	Salle Omnisport de Radès, Radès
20 January 2020; 14:00		(11–13)		Salle Omnisport de Radès, Radès

22 January 2020; 12:00	DR Congo	32–18	Gabon	Salle Omnisport de Radès, Radès
22 January 2020; 12:00		(15–10)		Salle Omnisport de Radès, Radès

22 January 2020; 16:00	Egypt	33–26	Angola	Salle Omnisport de Radès, Radès
22 January 2020; 16:00		(15–12)		Salle Omnisport de Radès, Radès

=== Group II ===
Pos	Team	Pld	W	D	L	GF	GA	GD	Pts	Qualification
1	Tunisia (H)	3	3	0	0	90	67	+23	6	Semifinals
2	Algeria	3	2	0	1	80	79	+1	4	Semifinals
3	Morocco	3	1	0	2	85	89	−4	2	5–8th place semifinals
4	Cape Verde	3	0	0	3	69	89	−20	0	5–8th place semifinals

Source: CAN 2020
Rules for classification: 1) points; 2) head-to-head points; 3) head-to-head goal difference; 4) head-to-head number of goals scored; 5) Goal difference.
(H) Hosts

20 January 2020; 16:00	Cape Verde	23–25	Algeria	Salle Omnisport de Radès, Radès
20 January 2020; 16:00		(12–13)		Salle Omnisport de Radès, Radès

20 January 2020; 18:00	Tunisia	31–24	Morocco	Salle Omnisport de Radès, Radès
20 January 2020; 18:00		(17–12)		Salle Omnisport de Radès, Radès

22 January 2020; 14:00	Cape Verde	25–31	Morocco	Salle Omnisport de Radès, Radès
22 January 2020; 14:00		(11–17)		Salle Omnisport de Radès, Radès

22 January 2020; 18:00	Tunisia	26–22	Algeria	Salle Omnisport de Radès, Radès
22 January 2020; 18:00		(12–11)		Salle Omnisport de Radès, Radès

== Knockout stage ==
=== Bracket ===
Semi-finals
24 January
Egypt	30
Algeria	27
24 January
Tunisia	39
Angola	23

Final
26 January
Egypt	27
Tunisia	22
Third place
26 January
Algeria	32
Angola	27

Fifth place bracket

5–8th place semifinals
24 January
DR Congo	30
Cape Verde (ET)	32
24 January
Morocco	31
Gabon	27

Fifth place
25 January
Cape Verde	37
Morocco	28
Seventh place
26 January
DR Congo	30
Gabon	26

=== 5–8th place semifinals ===
24 January 2020; 13:00	Morocco	31–27	Gabon	Salle Omnisport de Radès, Radès
24 January 2020; 13:00		(12–8)		Salle Omnisport de Radès, Radès

24 January 2020
18:00
DR Congo
30–32 (ET)
Cape Verde
Hammamet Indoor Sports Hall, Hammamet

(13–10)

FT: 25–25 ET: 5–7

=== Semifinals ===
24 January 2020; 16:00	Egypt	30–27	Algeria	Salle Omnisport de Radès, Radès; Referees: Garcia, Marin (ESP)
24 January 2020; 16:00		(15–14)		Salle Omnisport de Radès, Radès; Referees: Garcia, Marin (ESP)

24 January 2020; 18:30	Tunisia	39–23	Angola	Salle Omnisport de Radès, Radès
24 January 2020; 18:30		(21–7)		Salle Omnisport de Radès, Radès

=== Seventh place game ===
26 January 2020; 09:30	DR Congo	30–26	Gabon	Salle Omnisport de Radès, Radès
26 January 2020; 09:30		(15–11)		Salle Omnisport de Radès, Radès

=== Fifth place game ===
25 January 2020; 16:00	Cape Verde	37–28	Morocco	Hammamet Indoor Sports Hall, Hammamet
25 January 2020; 16:00		(18–13)		Hammamet Indoor Sports Hall, Hammamet

=== Third place game ===
26 January 2020; 15:00	Algeria	32–27	Angola	Salle Omnisport de Radès, Radès
26 January 2020; 15:00		(15–14)		Salle Omnisport de Radès, Radès

=== Final ===
26 January 2020; 18:00	Egypt	27–22	Tunisia	Salle Omnisport de Radès, Radès
26 January 2020; 18:00		(15–11)		Salle Omnisport de Radès, Radès

== Final ranking and awards ==
Legend for qualification type
Qualified for the 2020 Summer Olympics and the 2021 World Championship
Qualified for the 2020 Summer Olympics Qualification and the 2021 World Championship
Qualified for the 2021 World Championship

Rank	Team
Gold medal	Egypt
Silver medal	Tunisia
Bronze medal	Algeria
4	Angola
5	Cape Verde
6	Morocco
7	DR Congo
8	Gabon
9	Congo
10	Guinea
11	Nigeria
12	Cameroon
13	Libya
14	Ivory Coast
15	Kenya
16	Zambia

=== All-Star Team ===
The all-star team and awards were announced on 3 February 2020.

Position	Player
Goalkeeper	Giovane Muachissengue (ANG)
Right wing	Mohammad Sanad (EGY)
Right back	Yahia Omar (EGY)
Centre back	Moustafa Hadj Sadok (ALG)
Left back	Ali Zein (EGY)
Left wing	Oussama Boughanmi (TUN)
Pivot	Jihed Jaballah (TUN)
Most Valuable Player	Yehia El-Deraa (EGY)
