= List of indoor arenas in Tunisia =

The following is a list of indoor arenas in Tunisia, with a capacity of at least 1,000 spectators. Most of the arenas in this list have multiple uses such as individual sports, team sports as well as cultural events and political events.

== Currently in use ==
#	Image	Arenas	Capacity	City	Tenants
1		Salle Omnisport de Radès	17,000	Radès, Ben Arous	Tunisian Olympic Committee
2		El Menzah Sports Palace	7,000	El Menzah, Aryanah	Tunisian Olympic Committee
3		Salle Bir Challouf	5,000	Nabeul, Nabeul	Stade Nabeulien
4		Mohamed-Mzali Sports Hall	5,000	Monastir, Monastir	US Monastir
5		Sousse Indoor Sports Hall	4,000	Sousse, Sousse	Étoile du Sahel
6		Raed Bejaoui Indoor Sports Complex	4,000	Sfax, Sfax	CS Sfaxien
7		Béni Khiar Indoor Sports Hall	3,000	Béni Khiar, Nabeul	Baht Béni Khiar
8		Hammamet Indoor Sports Hall	3,000	Hammamet, Nabeul	AS Hammamet HC
9		Taoufik Bouhima Indoor Hall	2,500	Radès, Ben Arous	ES de Radès
10		Kairouan Indoor Sports Hall	2,500	Kairouan, Kairouan	JS Kairouan
11		Salle Mohamed-Zouaoui	2,000	Tunis, Tunis	Esperance de Tunis HB; Espérance de Tunis VB
12		Aryanah Indoor Sports Hall	2,000	Aryanah, Ariana	UCA Volleyball; ASEA Handball
13		Salle Chérif-Bellamine	1,500	Tunis, Tunis	Club Africain HB; Club Africain WHB; Club Africain BC; Club Africain WVC
14		Salle Omnisports Fatnassi	1,000	Bizerte, Bizerte	CA Bizertin
15		Salle Omnisports Sayada	1,000	Sayada, Monastir	Sayada Handball

== Future arenas ==
Stadium	Capacity	City	Tenant	Status	Planned opening year
Sfax New Sports Hall	6,000	Sfax	CS Sfaxien	Under Planning	2020–21

== See also ==
- List of indoor arenas in Africa
- List of stadiums by capacity
- Lists of stadiums
