= 2005 World Men's Handball Championship =

Tournament details
- Host country: Tunisia
- Venues: 5 (in 5 host cities)
- Dates: 23 January – 6 February
- Teams: 24 (from 5 confederations)

Final positions
- Champions: Spain (1st title)
- Runners-up: Croatia
- Third place: France
- Fourth place: Tunisia

Tournament statistics
- Matches played: 86
- Goals scored: 4,825 (56.1 per match)
- Top scorer(s): Wissem Hmam (TUN) (81 goals)

Awards
- Best player: Ivano Balić (CRO)

The 2005 World Men's Handball Championship was the 19th team handball World Championship. It was played in Tunisia from 23 January to 6 February 2005.

The winner of the gold medal was Spain, Croatia took silver and France won the bronze.

== Venues ==
=== List ===
5 Tunisian cities were hosts for the 2005 Championship. The most modern stadiums – spread all over the country – had been selected. The final match took place in the Hall 7th Novembre in Radès, south-east of the capital Tunis.

Town	Stadium	max. spectators
Radès	Hall 7th Novembre	14.000
Tunis	El Menzah Sports Palace	5.500
Sousse	Olympic Sports Hall	5.000
Nabeul	Salle Bir Challouf	5.000
Sfax	Sfax Hall 7th Novembre	4.000

Radès	Tunis	Sousse
Hall 7th Novembre	El Menzah Sports Palace	Olympic Sports Hall
Capacity: 14,000	Capacity: 5,500	Capacity: 5,000
Nabeul	2005 World Men's Handball Championship is located in Tunisia	
Salle Bir Challouf	2005 World Men's Handball Championship is located in Tunisia	
Capacity: 5,000	2005 World Men's Handball Championship is located in Tunisia	
Sfax	2005 World Men's Handball Championship is located in Tunisia	
Sfax Hall 7th Novembre	2005 World Men's Handball Championship is located in Tunisia	
Capacity: 4,000	2005 World Men's Handball Championship is located in Tunisia	

== Qualification ==
Competition	Dates	Vacancies	Qualified
Host nation	23 November 2002	1	Tunisia
2003 World Men's Handball Championship	20 January – 2 February 2003	1	Croatia
2004 European Men's Handball Championship	22 January – 1 February 2004	3	Germany; Slovenia; Denmark
2004 Asian Men's Handball Championship	12–21 February 2004	3	Kuwait; Japan; Qatar
2004 African Men's Handball Championship	8–18 April 2004	3	Egypt; Angola; Algeria
European qualification	7 January – 6 June 2004	9	Czech Republic; France; Greece; Iceland; Norway; Russia; Serbia and Montenegro; Spain; Sweden
2004 Oceania Handball Championship	7–9 June 2004	1	Australia
2004 Pan American Men's Handball Championship	20–24 July 2004	3	Argentina; Brazil; Canada

== Preliminary round ==
=== Group A ===
Pos	Team	Pld	W	D	L	GF	GA	GD	Pts	Qualification
1	Tunisia (H)	5	3	2	0	159	118	+41	8	Main round
2	Greece	5	3	1	1	132	117	+15	7 (Note: Greece 20–19 France)	Main round
3	France	5	3	1	1	161	106	+55	7	Main round
4	Denmark	5	3	0	2	174	117	+57	6	
5	Angola	5	1	0	4	108	178	−70	2	
6	Canada	5	0	0	5	103	201	−98	0	

Source: IHF
(H) Hosts
Notes:

23 January 2005; 17:00	Tunisia	39–23	Angola	Hall 7th Novembre, Radès; Referees: Vakula, Ljudovik (UKR)
23 January 2005; 17:00	Haj Ahmed 6	(20–10)	J. Pereira 6	Hall 7th Novembre, Radès; Referees: Vakula, Ljudovik (UKR)
23 January 2005; 17:00	3× (yellow card) 6× (suspension)	Report	3× (yellow card) 7× (suspension)	Hall 7th Novembre, Radès; Referees: Vakula, Ljudovik (UKR)

23 January 2005; 19:00	France	44–16	Canada	Hall 7th Novembre, Radès; Referees: Adjemian, Götz (ARG)
23 January 2005; 19:00	Abati, Anquetil 8	(24–5)	three players 3	Hall 7th Novembre, Radès; Referees: Adjemian, Götz (ARG)
23 January 2005; 19:00	3× (yellow card) 4× (suspension)	Report	3× (yellow card) 9× (suspension)	Hall 7th Novembre, Radès; Referees: Adjemian, Götz (ARG)

23 January 2005; 21:00	Denmark	27–23	Greece	Hall 7th Novembre, Radès; Referees: Baum, Góralczyk (POL)
23 January 2005; 21:00	Stryger 11	(14–15)	Balomenos, Karypidis 6	Hall 7th Novembre, Radès; Referees: Baum, Góralczyk (POL)
23 January 2005; 21:00	4× (yellow card) 9× (suspension) 1× (red card)	Report	4× (yellow card) 7× (suspension)	Hall 7th Novembre, Radès; Referees: Baum, Góralczyk (POL)

25 January 2005; 16:15	Greece	20–19	France	Hall 7th Novembre, Radès; Referees: Aly Hassan, Selim (EGY)
25 January 2005; 16:15	Sanikis 6	(9–11)	Anquetil 5	Hall 7th Novembre, Radès; Referees: Aly Hassan, Selim (EGY)
25 January 2005; 16:15	4× (yellow card) 6× (suspension) 1× (red card)	Report	3× (yellow card) 4× (suspension)	Hall 7th Novembre, Radès; Referees: Aly Hassan, Selim (EGY)

25 January 2005; 18:15	Canada	20–42	Tunisia	Hall 7th Novembre, Radès; Referees: Baum, Góralczyk (POL)
25 January 2005; 18:15	three players 4	(8–19)	Madi 8	Hall 7th Novembre, Radès; Referees: Baum, Góralczyk (POL)
25 January 2005; 18:15	3× (yellow card) 6× (suspension) 1× (red card)	Report	3× (yellow card) 2× (suspension)	Hall 7th Novembre, Radès; Referees: Baum, Góralczyk (POL)

25 January 2005; 20:15	Angola	19–47	Denmark	Hall 7th Novembre, Radès; Referees: Herczeg, Südi (HUN)
25 January 2005; 20:15	Dias 5	(9–23)	Schnuchel 10	Hall 7th Novembre, Radès; Referees: Herczeg, Südi (HUN)
25 January 2005; 20:15	3× (yellow card) 8× (suspension)	Report	3× (yellow card) 5× (suspension)	Hall 7th Novembre, Radès; Referees: Herczeg, Südi (HUN)

26 January 2005; 16:15	Greece	26–21	Angola	Hall 7th Novembre, Radès; Referees: Herczeg, Südi (HUN)
26 January 2005; 16:15	Zivulovic 6	(15–9)	P. Pereira 6	Hall 7th Novembre, Radès; Referees: Herczeg, Südi (HUN)
26 January 2005; 16:15	4× (yellow card) 7× (suspension) 1× (red card)	Report	3× (yellow card) 9× (suspension) 1× (red card)	Hall 7th Novembre, Radès; Referees: Herczeg, Südi (HUN)

26 January 2005; 18:15	France	26–26	Tunisia	Hall 7th Novembre, Radès; Referees: Hansson, Olsson (SWE)
26 January 2005; 18:15	Anquetil 7	(15–11)	Hmam 9	Hall 7th Novembre, Radès; Referees: Hansson, Olsson (SWE)
26 January 2005; 18:15	2× (yellow card) 4× (suspension) 1× (red card)	Report	2× (yellow card) 6× (suspension) 2× (red card)	Hall 7th Novembre, Radès; Referees: Hansson, Olsson (SWE)

26 January 2005; 20:15	Denmark	52–18	Canada	Hall 7th Novembre, Radès; Referees: Lemme, Ullrich (GER)
26 January 2005; 20:15	Christiansen 14	(25–7)	Bessette-Collette 4	Hall 7th Novembre, Radès; Referees: Lemme, Ullrich (GER)
26 January 2005; 20:15	3× (yellow card) 2× (suspension)	Report	3× (yellow card) 3× (suspension)	Hall 7th Novembre, Radès; Referees: Lemme, Ullrich (GER)

28 January 2005; 16:15	Canada	23–36	Greece	Hall 7th Novembre, Radès; Referees: Aly Hassan, Selim (EGY)
28 January 2005; 16:15	Bessette-Collette 5	(11–16)	Karypidis 6	Hall 7th Novembre, Radès; Referees: Aly Hassan, Selim (EGY)
28 January 2005; 16:15	3× (yellow card) 6× (suspension) 1× (red card)	Report	3× (yellow card) 2× (suspension)	Hall 7th Novembre, Radès; Referees: Aly Hassan, Selim (EGY)

28 January 2005; 18:15	Tunisia	25–22	Denmark	Hall 7th Novembre, Radès; Referees: Vakula, Ljudovik (UKR)
28 January 2005; 18:15	Hmam 9	(10–10)	Christiansen, Jørgensen 4	Hall 7th Novembre, Radès; Referees: Vakula, Ljudovik (UKR)
28 January 2005; 18:15	3× (yellow card) 7× (suspension)	Report	4× (yellow card) 6× (suspension)	Hall 7th Novembre, Radès; Referees: Vakula, Ljudovik (UKR)

28 January 2005; 20:15	France	40–18	Angola	Hall 7th Novembre, Radès; Referees: Imbronjev, Grković (SCG)
28 January 2005; 20:15	Girault 11	(19–9)	P. Pereira 5	Hall 7th Novembre, Radès; Referees: Imbronjev, Grković (SCG)
28 January 2005; 20:15	3× (yellow card) 5× (suspension)	Report	5× (yellow card) 2× (suspension)	Hall 7th Novembre, Radès; Referees: Imbronjev, Grković (SCG)

29 January 2005; 16:15	Angola	27–26	Canada	Hall 7th Novembre, Radès; Referees: Adjemian, Götz (ARG)
29 January 2005; 16:15	P. Pereira 10	(16–11)	Bessette-Collette 6	Hall 7th Novembre, Radès; Referees: Adjemian, Götz (ARG)
29 January 2005; 16:15	3× (yellow card) 8× (suspension) 1× (red card)	Report	3× (yellow card) 6× (suspension) 1× (red card)	Hall 7th Novembre, Radès; Referees: Adjemian, Götz (ARG)

29 January 2005; 18:15	Tunisia	27–27	Greece	Hall 7th Novembre, Radès; Referees: Imbronjev, Grković (SCG)
29 January 2005; 18:15	Ayed, Tej 6	(17–13)	Karypidis 9	Hall 7th Novembre, Radès; Referees: Imbronjev, Grković (SCG)
29 January 2005; 18:15	3× (yellow card) 5× (suspension)	Report	4× (yellow card) 7× (suspension) 2× (red card)	Hall 7th Novembre, Radès; Referees: Imbronjev, Grković (SCG)

29 January 2005; 20:15	Denmark	26–32	France	Hall 7th Novembre, Radès; Referees: Lemme, Ullrich (GER)
29 January 2005; 20:15	Nielsen, Stryger 6	(13–14)	Guigou, Karabatić 7	Hall 7th Novembre, Radès; Referees: Lemme, Ullrich (GER)
29 January 2005; 20:15	3× (yellow card) 5× (suspension)	Report	2× (yellow card) 4× (suspension)	Hall 7th Novembre, Radès; Referees: Lemme, Ullrich (GER)

=== Group B ===
Pos	Team	Pld	W	D	L	GF	GA	GD	Pts	Qualification
1	Russia	5	5	0	0	151	103	+48	10	Main round
2	Czech Republic	5	2	2	1	145	136	+9	6 (Note: Czech Republic 28–26 Slovenia)	Main round
3	Slovenia	5	3	0	2	154	137	+17	6	Main round
4	Iceland	5	2	1	2	154	144	+10	5	
5	Algeria	5	1	1	3	138	153	−15	3	
6	Kuwait	5	0	0	5	101	170	−69	0	

Source: IHF
Notes:

23 January 2005; 17:00	Czech Republic	34–34	Iceland	El Menzah Sports Palace, Tunis; Referees: Lemme, Ullrich (GER)
23 January 2005; 17:00	Juříček 7	(20–14)	Stefánsson 11	El Menzah Sports Palace, Tunis; Referees: Lemme, Ullrich (GER)
23 January 2005; 17:00	3× (yellow card) 7× (suspension)	Report	3× (yellow card) 5× (suspension)	El Menzah Sports Palace, Tunis; Referees: Lemme, Ullrich (GER)

23 January 2005; 19:00	Russia	28–22	Algeria	El Menzah Sports Palace, Tunis; Referees: Herczeg, Südi (HUN)
23 January 2005; 19:00	Koksharov 15	(16–12)	Biloum 6	El Menzah Sports Palace, Tunis; Referees: Herczeg, Südi (HUN)
23 January 2005; 19:00	2× (yellow card) 7× (suspension) 1× (red card)	Report	2× (yellow card) 10× (suspension) 1× (red card)	El Menzah Sports Palace, Tunis; Referees: Herczeg, Südi (HUN)

23 January 2005; 21:00	Slovenia	34–17	Kuwait	El Menzah Sports Palace, Tunis; Referees: Aly Hassan, Selim (EGY)
23 January 2005; 21:00	Mlakar 6	(15–11)	Al-Enezi 6	El Menzah Sports Palace, Tunis; Referees: Aly Hassan, Selim (EGY)
23 January 2005; 21:00	3× (yellow card) 6× (suspension)	Report	3× (yellow card) 4× (suspension)	El Menzah Sports Palace, Tunis; Referees: Aly Hassan, Selim (EGY)

25 January 2005; 16:15	Kuwait	11–38	Russia	El Menzah Sports Palace, Tunis; Referees: Imbronjev, Grković (SCG)
25 January 2005; 16:15	three players 2	(4–23)	Peskov 9	El Menzah Sports Palace, Tunis; Referees: Imbronjev, Grković (SCG)
25 January 2005; 16:15	3× (yellow card) 6× (suspension) 1× (red card)	Report	3× (yellow card) 3× (suspension)	El Menzah Sports Palace, Tunis; Referees: Imbronjev, Grković (SCG)

25 January 2005; 18:15	Algeria	29–29	Czech Republic	El Menzah Sports Palace, Tunis; Referees: Hansson, Olsson (SWE)
25 January 2005; 18:15	Biloum, Filah 6	(11–15)	Juříček 8	El Menzah Sports Palace, Tunis; Referees: Hansson, Olsson (SWE)
25 January 2005; 18:15	3× (yellow card) 9× (suspension)	Report	3× (yellow card) 4× (suspension)	El Menzah Sports Palace, Tunis; Referees: Hansson, Olsson (SWE)

25 January 2005; 20:15	Iceland	33–34	Slovenia	El Menzah Sports Palace, Tunis; Referees: Adjemian, Götz (ARG)
25 January 2005; 20:15	Petersson 7	(16–14)	Jovičič 10	El Menzah Sports Palace, Tunis; Referees: Adjemian, Götz (ARG)
25 January 2005; 20:15	4× (yellow card) 9× (suspension)	Report	4× (yellow card) 9× (suspension) 1× (red card)	El Menzah Sports Palace, Tunis; Referees: Adjemian, Götz (ARG)

26 January 2005; 16:15	Slovenia	33–28	Algeria	El Menzah Sports Palace, Tunis; Referees: Vakula, Ljudovik (UKR)
26 January 2005; 16:15	Rutenka 13	(19–14)	Filah 7	El Menzah Sports Palace, Tunis; Referees: Vakula, Ljudovik (UKR)
26 January 2005; 16:15	3× (yellow card) 8× (suspension)	Report	3× (yellow card) 4× (suspension)	El Menzah Sports Palace, Tunis; Referees: Vakula, Ljudovik (UKR)

26 January 2005; 18:15	Russia	25–21	Czech Republic	El Menzah Sports Palace, Tunis; Referees: Imbronjev, Grković (SCG)
26 January 2005; 18:15	Koksharov 8	(12–12)	Jícha 8	El Menzah Sports Palace, Tunis; Referees: Imbronjev, Grković (SCG)
26 January 2005; 18:15	3× (yellow card) 6× (suspension)	Report	2× (yellow card) 5× (suspension) 1× (red card)	El Menzah Sports Palace, Tunis; Referees: Imbronjev, Grković (SCG)

26 January 2005; 20:15	Kuwait	22–31	Iceland	El Menzah Sports Palace, Tunis; Referees: Baum, Góralczyk (POL)
26 January 2005; 20:15	Abi Alza 5	(12–17)	Hólmgeirsson 8	El Menzah Sports Palace, Tunis; Referees: Baum, Góralczyk (POL)
26 January 2005; 20:15	4× (yellow card) 7× (suspension) 1× (red card)	Report	4× (yellow card) 9× (suspension) 1× (red card)	El Menzah Sports Palace, Tunis; Referees: Baum, Góralczyk (POL)

28 January 2005; 16:15	Russia	29–22	Iceland	El Menzah Sports Palace, Tunis; Referees: Lemme, Ullrich (GER)
28 January 2005; 16:15	three players 6	(12–12)	three players 5	El Menzah Sports Palace, Tunis; Referees: Lemme, Ullrich (GER)
28 January 2005; 16:15	3× (yellow card) 4× (suspension)	Report	3× (yellow card) 4× (suspension)	El Menzah Sports Palace, Tunis; Referees: Lemme, Ullrich (GER)

28 January 2005; 18:15	Czech Republic	28–26	Slovenia	El Menzah Sports Palace, Tunis; Referees: Baum, Góralczyk (POL)
28 January 2005; 18:15	Filip 8	(17–14)	Brumen 6	El Menzah Sports Palace, Tunis; Referees: Baum, Góralczyk (POL)
28 January 2005; 18:15	3× (yellow card) 5× (suspension)	Report	3× (yellow card) 2× (suspension)	El Menzah Sports Palace, Tunis; Referees: Baum, Góralczyk (POL)

28 January 2005; 20:15	Algeria	34–29	Kuwait	El Menzah Sports Palace, Tunis; Referees: Hansson, Olsson (SWE)
28 January 2005; 20:15	Nedjel 8	(20–14)	Al-Enezi, Al-Shatti 7	El Menzah Sports Palace, Tunis; Referees: Hansson, Olsson (SWE)
28 January 2005; 20:15	1× (yellow card) 4× (suspension) 1× (red card)	Report	3× (yellow card) 7× (suspension)	El Menzah Sports Palace, Tunis; Referees: Hansson, Olsson (SWE)

29 January 2005; 16:15	Iceland	34–25	Algeria	El Menzah Sports Palace, Tunis; Referees: Vakula, Ljudovik (UKR)
29 January 2005; 16:15	Sigurðsson 9	(19–11)	Nedjel 6	El Menzah Sports Palace, Tunis; Referees: Vakula, Ljudovik (UKR)
29 January 2005; 16:15	4× (yellow card) 6× (suspension)	Report	3× (yellow card) 8× (suspension)	El Menzah Sports Palace, Tunis; Referees: Vakula, Ljudovik (UKR)

29 January 2005; 18:15	Czech Republic	33–22	Kuwait	El Menzah Sports Palace, Tunis; Referees: Herczeg, Südi (HUN)
29 January 2005; 18:15	Brůna 8	(16–9)	Al-Enezi 9	El Menzah Sports Palace, Tunis; Referees: Herczeg, Südi (HUN)
29 January 2005; 18:15	3× (yellow card) 7× (suspension)	Report	3× (yellow card) 5× (suspension) 2× (red card)	El Menzah Sports Palace, Tunis; Referees: Herczeg, Südi (HUN)

29 January 2005; 20:15	Slovenia	27–31	Russia	El Menzah Sports Palace, Tunis; Referees: Hansson, Olsson (SWE)
29 January 2005; 20:15	Brumen 9	(18–16)	Koksharov 10	El Menzah Sports Palace, Tunis; Referees: Hansson, Olsson (SWE)
29 January 2005; 20:15	3× (yellow card) 3× (suspension)	Report	3× (yellow card) 6× (suspension)	El Menzah Sports Palace, Tunis; Referees: Hansson, Olsson (SWE)

=== Group C ===
Pos	Team	Pld	W	D	L	GF	GA	GD	Pts	Qualification
1	Croatia	5	5	0	0	169	124	+45	10	Main round
2	Spain	5	4	0	1	191	128	+63	8	Main round
3	Sweden	5	3	0	2	164	118	+46	6	Main round
4	Japan	5	2	0	3	121	151	−30	4	
5	Argentina	5	1	0	4	133	141	−8	2	
6	Australia	5	0	0	5	85	201	−116	0	

Source: IHF

23 January 2005; 17:00	Croatia	36–23	Argentina	Hall 7th Novembre, Sfax; Referees: Bashmak, Frolov (RUS)
23 January 2005; 17:00	Džomba 7	(15–13)	Gull 8	Hall 7th Novembre, Sfax; Referees: Bashmak, Frolov (RUS)
23 January 2005; 17:00	3× (yellow card) 5× (suspension)	Report	3× (yellow card) 5× (suspension)	Hall 7th Novembre, Sfax; Referees: Bashmak, Frolov (RUS)

23 January 2005; 19:00	Spain	41–22	Japan	Hall 7th Novembre, Sfax; Referees: Bord, Buy (FRA)
23 January 2005; 19:00	three players 6	(21–14)	Nakagawa 4	Hall 7th Novembre, Sfax; Referees: Bord, Buy (FRA)
23 January 2005; 19:00	1× (yellow card) 1× (suspension)	Report	3× (yellow card) 5× (suspension)	Hall 7th Novembre, Sfax; Referees: Bord, Buy (FRA)

23 January 2005; 21:00	Sweden	49–16	Australia	Hall 7th Novembre, Sfax; Referees: Al-Musaiger, Abul Rethaie (KUW)
23 January 2005; 21:00	five players 6	(22–5)	Ramadani 3	Hall 7th Novembre, Sfax; Referees: Al-Musaiger, Abul Rethaie (KUW)
23 January 2005; 21:00	3× (yellow card) 2× (suspension)	Report	3× (yellow card) 2× (suspension)	Hall 7th Novembre, Sfax; Referees: Al-Musaiger, Abul Rethaie (KUW)

24 January 2005; 16:15	Australia	19–51	Spain	Hall 7th Novembre, Sfax; Referees: Lauren, Nielsen (DEN)
24 January 2005; 16:15	Deane, McCormack 4	(4–23)	García 8	Hall 7th Novembre, Sfax; Referees: Lauren, Nielsen (DEN)
24 January 2005; 16:15	3× (yellow card) 6× (suspension) 1× (red card)	Report	2× (yellow card) 1× (suspension)	Hall 7th Novembre, Sfax; Referees: Lauren, Nielsen (DEN)

24 January 2005; 18:15	Japan	25–34	Croatia	Hall 7th Novembre, Sfax; Referees: Al-Musaiger, Abul Rethaie (KUW)
24 January 2005; 18:15	three players 6	(14–15)	Džomba 8	Hall 7th Novembre, Sfax; Referees: Al-Musaiger, Abul Rethaie (KUW)
24 January 2005; 18:15	2× (yellow card) 3× (suspension)	Report	2× (yellow card) 1× (suspension)	Hall 7th Novembre, Sfax; Referees: Al-Musaiger, Abul Rethaie (KUW)

24 January 2005; 20:15	Argentina	23–30	Sweden	Hall 7th Novembre, Sfax; Referees: Bord, Buy (FRA)
24 January 2005; 20:15	Gull 9	(9–12)	Lövgren 7	Hall 7th Novembre, Sfax; Referees: Bord, Buy (FRA)
24 January 2005; 20:15	1× (yellow card) 4× (suspension)	Report	3× (yellow card) 6× (suspension) 1× (red card)	Hall 7th Novembre, Sfax; Referees: Bord, Buy (FRA)

26 January 2005; 16:15	Croatia	38–18	Australia	Hall 7th Novembre, Sfax; Referees: Ammar, Fredj (TUN)
26 January 2005; 16:15	Zrnić 11	(24–7)	Calvert 5	Hall 7th Novembre, Sfax; Referees: Ammar, Fredj (TUN)
26 January 2005; 16:15	2× (yellow card) 6× (suspension) 1× (red card)	Report	3× (yellow card) 6× (suspension)	Hall 7th Novembre, Sfax; Referees: Ammar, Fredj (TUN)

26 January 2005; 18:15	Argentina	25–27	Japan	Hall 7th Novembre, Sfax; Referees: Lauren, Nielsen (DEN)
26 January 2005; 18:15	Gull, Viscovich 6	(13–11)	Myazaki 6	Hall 7th Novembre, Sfax; Referees: Lauren, Nielsen (DEN)
26 January 2005; 18:15	2× (yellow card) 5× (suspension)	Report	3× (yellow card) 5× (suspension)	Hall 7th Novembre, Sfax; Referees: Lauren, Nielsen (DEN)

26 January 2005; 20:15	Sweden	26–33	Spain	Hall 7th Novembre, Sfax; Referees: Bord, Buy (FRA)
26 January 2005; 20:15	Petersson 7	(17–14)	Ortega 7	Hall 7th Novembre, Sfax; Referees: Bord, Buy (FRA)
26 January 2005; 20:15	3× (yellow card) 4× (suspension)	Report	2× (yellow card) 2× (suspension)	Hall 7th Novembre, Sfax; Referees: Bord, Buy (FRA)

27 January 2005; 16:15	Sweden	32–18	Japan	Hall 7th Novembre, Sfax; Referees: Ammar, Fredj (TUN)
27 January 2005; 16:15	Källman 5	(13–7)	Matsubayashi, Taba 4	Hall 7th Novembre, Sfax; Referees: Ammar, Fredj (TUN)
27 January 2005; 16:15	3× (yellow card) 4× (suspension)	Report	3× (yellow card) 8× (suspension)	Hall 7th Novembre, Sfax; Referees: Ammar, Fredj (TUN)

27 January 2005; 18:15	Spain	31–33	Croatia	Hall 7th Novembre, Sfax; Referees: Lauren, Nielsen (DEN)
27 January 2005; 18:15	García 9	(15–15)	Balić, Lacković 8	Hall 7th Novembre, Sfax; Referees: Lauren, Nielsen (DEN)
27 January 2005; 18:15	3× (yellow card) 2× (suspension)	Report	4× (yellow card) 6× (suspension)	Hall 7th Novembre, Sfax; Referees: Lauren, Nielsen (DEN)

27 January 2005; 20:15	Australia	13–34	Argentina	Hall 7th Novembre, Sfax; Referees: Al-Musaiger, Abul Rethaie (KUW)
27 January 2005; 20:15	Abuhamed 3	(8–18)	Acetti 9	Hall 7th Novembre, Sfax; Referees: Al-Musaiger, Abul Rethaie (KUW)
27 January 2005; 20:15	2× (yellow card) 4× (suspension)	Report	3× (yellow card) 3× (suspension)	Hall 7th Novembre, Sfax; Referees: Al-Musaiger, Abul Rethaie (KUW)

29 January 2005; 16:15	Japan	29–19	Australia	Hall 7th Novembre, Sfax; Referees: Al-Musaiger, Abul Rethaie (KUW)
29 January 2005; 16:15	Myazaki, Shimokawa 6	(16–10)	Hoppner 5	Hall 7th Novembre, Sfax; Referees: Al-Musaiger, Abul Rethaie (KUW)
29 January 2005; 16:15	2× (yellow card) 4× (suspension)	Report	2× (yellow card) 7× (suspension)	Hall 7th Novembre, Sfax; Referees: Al-Musaiger, Abul Rethaie (KUW)

29 January 2005; 18:15	Spain	35–28	Argentina	Hall 7th Novembre, Sfax; Referees: Repenšek, Požežnik (SLO)
29 January 2005; 18:15	García 6	(15–14)	Carou 6	Hall 7th Novembre, Sfax; Referees: Repenšek, Požežnik (SLO)
29 January 2005; 18:15	2× (yellow card) 3× (suspension)	Report	3× (yellow card) 4× (suspension)	Hall 7th Novembre, Sfax; Referees: Repenšek, Požežnik (SLO)

29 January 2005; 20:15	Croatia	28–27	Sweden	Hall 7th Novembre, Sfax; Referees: Dolejš, Kohout (CZE)
29 January 2005; 20:15	Džomba, Vori 6	(14–15)	Larholm 6	Hall 7th Novembre, Sfax; Referees: Dolejš, Kohout (CZE)
29 January 2005; 20:15	3× (yellow card) 3× (suspension)	Report	4× (yellow card) 6× (suspension)	Hall 7th Novembre, Sfax; Referees: Dolejš, Kohout (CZE)

=== Group D ===
Pos	Team	Pld	W	D	L	GF	GA	GD	Pts	Qualification
1	Serbia and Montenegro	5	4	0	1	139	117	+22	8	Main round
2	Norway	5	3	1	1	142	105	+37	7 (Note: Norway 27–27 Germany)	Main round
3	Germany	5	3	1	1	149	115	+34	7	Main round
4	Egypt	5	3	0	2	123	123	0	6	
5	Brazil	5	1	0	4	104	146	−42	2	
6	Qatar	5	0	0	5	117	168	−51	0	

Source: IHF
Notes:

23 January 2005; 17:00	Germany	28–25	Egypt	Olympic Sports Hall, Sousse; Referees: Arnaldsson, Viðarsson (ISL)
23 January 2005; 17:00	Jansen 7	(15–13)	Zaky 9	Olympic Sports Hall, Sousse; Referees: Arnaldsson, Viðarsson (ISL)
23 January 2005; 17:00	3× (yellow card) 4× (suspension) 1× (red card)	Report	3× (yellow card) 5× (suspension)	Olympic Sports Hall, Sousse; Referees: Arnaldsson, Viðarsson (ISL)

23 January 2005; 19:00	Serbia and Montenegro	34–26	Qatar	Olympic Sports Hall, Sousse; Referees: Ayed, Chebil (TUN)
23 January 2005; 19:00	Đukanović 5	(20–10)	N. Al Saad 9	Olympic Sports Hall, Sousse; Referees: Ayed, Chebil (TUN)
23 January 2005; 19:00	3× (yellow card) 8× (suspension) 1× (red card)	Report	3× (yellow card) 12× (suspension) 1× (red card)	Olympic Sports Hall, Sousse; Referees: Ayed, Chebil (TUN)

23 January 2005; 21:00	Norway	34–12	Brazil	Olympic Sports Hall, Sousse; Referees: Dolejš, Kohout (CZE)
23 January 2005; 21:00	Lauritzen 7	(16–5)	Pacheco Filho 3	Olympic Sports Hall, Sousse; Referees: Dolejš, Kohout (CZE)
23 January 2005; 21:00	3× (yellow card) 5× (suspension)	Report	3× (yellow card) 5× (suspension)	Olympic Sports Hall, Sousse; Referees: Dolejš, Kohout (CZE)

24 January 2005; 16:15	Egypt	24–22	Serbia and Montenegro	Olympic Sports Hall, Sousse; Referees: Dolejš, Kohout (CZE)
24 January 2005; 16:15	Zaky 7	(13–13)	Anđelković 5	Olympic Sports Hall, Sousse; Referees: Dolejš, Kohout (CZE)
24 January 2005; 16:15	2× (yellow card) 7× (suspension)	Report	4× (yellow card) 7× (suspension)	Olympic Sports Hall, Sousse; Referees: Dolejš, Kohout (CZE)

24 January 2005; 18:15	Brazil	23–30	Germany	Olympic Sports Hall, Sousse; Referees: Repenšek, Požežnik (SLO)
24 January 2005; 18:15	Cardoso 4	(11–17)	Kehrmann 7	Olympic Sports Hall, Sousse; Referees: Repenšek, Požežnik (SLO)
24 January 2005; 18:15	3× (yellow card) 3× (suspension)	Report	3× (yellow card) 2× (suspension)	Olympic Sports Hall, Sousse; Referees: Repenšek, Požežnik (SLO)

24 January 2005; 20:15	Qatar	22–33	Norway	Olympic Sports Hall, Sousse; Referees: Arnaldsson, Viðarsson (ISL)
24 January 2005; 20:15	A. Al Saad 12	(12–17)	three players 6	Olympic Sports Hall, Sousse; Referees: Arnaldsson, Viðarsson (ISL)
24 January 2005; 20:15	4× (yellow card) 7× (suspension)	Report	3× (yellow card) 5× (suspension)	Olympic Sports Hall, Sousse; Referees: Arnaldsson, Viðarsson (ISL)

26 January 2005; 16:15	Germany	40–15	Qatar	Olympic Sports Hall, Sousse; Referees: Ayed, Chebil (TUN)
26 January 2005; 16:15	Zeitz 6	(20–4)	N. Al Saad 10	Olympic Sports Hall, Sousse; Referees: Ayed, Chebil (TUN)
26 January 2005; 16:15	3× (yellow card) 6× (suspension)	Report	2× (yellow card) 5× (suspension)	Olympic Sports Hall, Sousse; Referees: Ayed, Chebil (TUN)

26 January 2005; 18:15	Egypt	24–20	Brazil	Olympic Sports Hall, Sousse; Referees: Repenšek, Požežnik (SLO)
26 January 2005; 18:15	Zaky 6	(11–12)	Rui 6	Olympic Sports Hall, Sousse; Referees: Repenšek, Požežnik (SLO)
26 January 2005; 18:15	4× (yellow card) 6× (suspension) 1× (red card)	Report	3× (yellow card) 5× (suspension)	Olympic Sports Hall, Sousse; Referees: Repenšek, Požežnik (SLO)

26 January 2005; 20:15	Serbia and Montenegro	25–24	Norway	Olympic Sports Hall, Sousse; Referees: Dolejš, Kohout (CZE)
26 January 2005; 20:15	Sudzum 9	(10–13)	Kjelling 11	Olympic Sports Hall, Sousse; Referees: Dolejš, Kohout (CZE)
26 January 2005; 20:15	4× (yellow card) 10× (suspension) 1× (red card)	Report	4× (yellow card) 5× (suspension) 1× (red card)	Olympic Sports Hall, Sousse; Referees: Dolejš, Kohout (CZE)

27 January 2005; 16:15	Qatar	29–31	Egypt	Olympic Sports Hall, Sousse; Referees: Arnaldsson, Viðarsson (ISL)
27 January 2005; 16:15	A. Al Saad 7	(10–17)	Zaky 6	Olympic Sports Hall, Sousse; Referees: Arnaldsson, Viðarsson (ISL)
27 January 2005; 16:15	3× (yellow card) 2× (suspension)	Report	3× (yellow card) 5× (suspension)	Olympic Sports Hall, Sousse; Referees: Arnaldsson, Viðarsson (ISL)

27 January 2005; 18:15	Serbia and Montenegro	33–19	Brazil	Olympic Sports Hall, Sousse; Referees: Ayed, Chebil (TUN)
27 January 2005; 18:15	Muratović 8	(15–13)	Pacheco Filho 7	Olympic Sports Hall, Sousse; Referees: Ayed, Chebil (TUN)
27 January 2005; 18:15	3× (yellow card) 8× (suspension) 1× (red card)	Report	3× (yellow card) 5× (suspension) 1× (red card)	Olympic Sports Hall, Sousse; Referees: Ayed, Chebil (TUN)

27 January 2005; 20:15	Norway	27–27	Germany	Olympic Sports Hall, Sousse; Referees: Repenšek, Požežnik (SLO)
27 January 2005; 20:15	Kjelling 12	(12–15)	Velyky 8	Olympic Sports Hall, Sousse; Referees: Repenšek, Požežnik (SLO)
27 January 2005; 20:15	2× (yellow card) 7× (suspension)	Report	3× (yellow card) 9× (suspension)	Olympic Sports Hall, Sousse; Referees: Repenšek, Požežnik (SLO)

29 January 2005; 14:00	Germany	24–25	Serbia and Montenegro	Olympic Sports Hall, Sousse; Referees: Arnaldsson, Viðarsson (ISL)
29 January 2005; 14:00	Velyky 7	(13–10)	Muratović, Nikolić 7	Olympic Sports Hall, Sousse; Referees: Arnaldsson, Viðarsson (ISL)
29 January 2005; 14:00	3× (yellow card) 4× (suspension)	Report	3× (yellow card) 5× (suspension)	Olympic Sports Hall, Sousse; Referees: Arnaldsson, Viðarsson (ISL)

29 January 2005; 18:15	Brazil	30–25	Qatar	Olympic Sports Hall, Sousse; Referees: Ammar, Fredj (TUN)
29 January 2005; 18:15	three players 6	(14–13)	A. Al Saad 6	Olympic Sports Hall, Sousse; Referees: Ammar, Fredj (TUN)
29 January 2005; 18:15	3× (yellow card) 8× (suspension) 1× (red card)	Report	3× (yellow card) 4× (suspension)	Olympic Sports Hall, Sousse; Referees: Ammar, Fredj (TUN)

29 January 2005; 20:15	Norway	24–19	Egypt	Olympic Sports Hall, Sousse; Referees: Bord, Buy (FRA)
29 January 2005; 20:15	Hagen 6	(13–9)	Zaky 8	Olympic Sports Hall, Sousse; Referees: Bord, Buy (FRA)
29 January 2005; 20:15	4× (yellow card) 10× (suspension) 1× (red card)	Report	4× (yellow card) 9× (suspension) 1× (red card)	Olympic Sports Hall, Sousse; Referees: Bord, Buy (FRA)

== Main round ==
=== Group I ===
Pos	Team	Pld	W	D	L	GF	GA	GD	Pts	Qualification
1	Tunisia (H)	5	2	3	0	150	128	+22	7	Semifinals
2	France	5	2	2	1	127	120	+7	6	Semifinals
3	Greece	5	2	1	2	134	138	−4	5	Fifth place game
4	Russia	5	2	0	3	126	137	−11	4 (Note: Russia 4 Pts; Czech Republic 2 Pts; Slovenia 0 Pts)	Seventh place game
5	Czech Republic	5	2	0	3	131	147	−16	4	Ninth place game
6	Slovenia	5	1	2	2	142	140	+2	4	Eleventh place game

Source: IHF
(H) Hosts
Notes:

31 January 2005; 16:15	Greece	29–37	Slovenia	Hall 7th Novembre, Radès; Referees: Vakula, Ljudovik (UKR)
31 January 2005; 16:15	Alvanos 6	(13–17)	Rutenka 8	Hall 7th Novembre, Radès; Referees: Vakula, Ljudovik (UKR)
31 January 2005; 16:15	4× (yellow card) 7× (suspension)	Report	3× (yellow card) 8× (suspension) 1× (red card)	Hall 7th Novembre, Radès; Referees: Vakula, Ljudovik (UKR)

31 January 2005; 18:15	Tunisia	36–25	Czech Republic	Hall 7th Novembre, Radès; Referees: Arnaldsson, Viðarsson (ISL)
31 January 2005; 18:15	Hmam 12	(20–13)	Juříček 10	Hall 7th Novembre, Radès; Referees: Arnaldsson, Viðarsson (ISL)
31 January 2005; 18:15	2× (yellow card) 7× (suspension)	Report	4× (yellow card) 4× (suspension) 2× (red card)	Hall 7th Novembre, Radès; Referees: Arnaldsson, Viðarsson (ISL)

31 January 2005; 20:15	France	25–22	Russia	Hall 7th Novembre, Radès; Referees: Lauren, Nielsen (DEN)
31 January 2005; 20:15	Karabatić 8	(12–8)	Koksharov 8	Hall 7th Novembre, Radès; Referees: Lauren, Nielsen (DEN)
31 January 2005; 20:15	3× (yellow card) 6× (suspension)	Report	3× (yellow card) 7× (suspension) 1× (red card)	Hall 7th Novembre, Radès; Referees: Lauren, Nielsen (DEN)

1 February 2005; 16:15	Czech Republic	26–31	France	Hall 7th Novembre, Radès; Referees: Imbronjev, Grković (SCG)
1 February 2005; 16:15	Filip 9	(9–16)	Fernandez, Guigou 5	Hall 7th Novembre, Radès; Referees: Imbronjev, Grković (SCG)
1 February 2005; 16:15	3× (yellow card) 7× (suspension)	Report	3× (yellow card) 4× (suspension)	Hall 7th Novembre, Radès; Referees: Imbronjev, Grković (SCG)

1 February 2005; 18:15	Slovenia	26–26	Tunisia	Hall 7th Novembre, Radès; Referees: Lemme, Ullrich (GER)
1 February 2005; 18:15	Jovičič, Natek 6	(9–11)	Megannem 8	Hall 7th Novembre, Radès; Referees: Lemme, Ullrich (GER)
1 February 2005; 18:15	3× (yellow card) 5× (suspension)	Report	3× (yellow card) 5× (suspension) 2× (red card)	Hall 7th Novembre, Radès; Referees: Lemme, Ullrich (GER)

1 February 2005; 20:15	Russia	24–29	Greece	Hall 7th Novembre, Radès; Referees: Hansson, Olsson (SWE)
1 February 2005; 20:15	Koksharov 9	(14–13)	Karypidis, Voglis 6	Hall 7th Novembre, Radès; Referees: Hansson, Olsson (SWE)
1 February 2005; 20:15	3× (yellow card) 6× (suspension)	Report	3× (yellow card) 7× (suspension)	Hall 7th Novembre, Radès; Referees: Hansson, Olsson (SWE)

3 February 2005; 16:15	Greece	29–31	Czech Republic	Hall 7th Novembre, Radès; Referees: Lemme, Ullrich (GER)
3 February 2005; 16:15	Alvanos 9	(16–16)	Filip 7	Hall 7th Novembre, Radès; Referees: Lemme, Ullrich (GER)
3 February 2005; 16:15	4× (yellow card) 6× (suspension)	Report	3× (yellow card) 5× (suspension)	Hall 7th Novembre, Radès; Referees: Lemme, Ullrich (GER)

3 February 2005; 18:15	Tunisia	35–24	Russia	Hall 7th Novembre, Radès; Referees: Imbronjev, Grković (SCG)
3 February 2005; 18:15	Hmam 13	(19–11)	Koksharov 8	Hall 7th Novembre, Radès; Referees: Imbronjev, Grković (SCG)
3 February 2005; 18:15	3× (yellow card) 5× (suspension)	Report	3× (yellow card) 7× (suspension)	Hall 7th Novembre, Radès; Referees: Imbronjev, Grković (SCG)

3 February 2005; 20:15	France	26–26	Slovenia	Hall 7th Novembre, Radès; Referees: Hansson, Olsson (SWE)
3 February 2005; 20:15	Guigou 8	(12–10)	Zorman 7	Hall 7th Novembre, Radès; Referees: Hansson, Olsson (SWE)
3 February 2005; 20:15	2× (yellow card) 4× (suspension) 1× (red card)	Report	3× (yellow card) 5× (suspension)	Hall 7th Novembre, Radès; Referees: Hansson, Olsson (SWE)

=== Group II ===
Pos	Team	Pld	W	D	L	GF	GA	GD	Pts	Qualification
1	Croatia	5	4	0	1	139	135	+4	8	Semifinals
2	Spain	5	3	1	1	155	139	+16	7	Semifinals
3	Serbia and Montenegro	5	2	2	1	127	126	+1	6	Fifth place game
4	Norway	5	2	1	2	137	139	−2	5	Seventh place game
5	Germany	5	1	1	3	132	135	−3	3	Ninth place game
6	Sweden	5	0	1	4	132	148	−16	1	Eleventh place game

Source: IHF

31 January 2005; 16:15	Spain	32–28	Germany	Salle Bir Challouf, Nabeul; Referees: Dolejš, Kohout (CZE)
31 January 2005; 16:15	Garralda 11	(15–12)	Jansen 8	Salle Bir Challouf, Nabeul; Referees: Dolejš, Kohout (CZE)
31 January 2005; 16:15	3× (yellow card) 4× (suspension)	Report	3× (yellow card) 8× (suspension) 1× (red card)	Salle Bir Challouf, Nabeul; Referees: Dolejš, Kohout (CZE)

31 January 2005; 18:15	Sweden	26–26	Serbia and Montenegro	Salle Bir Challouf, Nabeul; Referees: Baum, Góralczyk (POL)
31 January 2005; 18:15	Källman 6	(15–12)	Nikolić, Sudzum 6	Salle Bir Challouf, Nabeul; Referees: Baum, Góralczyk (POL)
31 January 2005; 18:15	3× (yellow card) 6× (suspension)	Report	3× (yellow card) 2× (suspension)	Salle Bir Challouf, Nabeul; Referees: Baum, Góralczyk (POL)

31 January 2005; 20:15	Croatia	25–28	Norway	Salle Bir Challouf, Nabeul; Referees: Bord, Buy (FRA)
31 January 2005; 20:15	Vori 7	(11–12)	Kjelling 7	Salle Bir Challouf, Nabeul; Referees: Bord, Buy (FRA)
31 January 2005; 20:15	3× (yellow card) 4× (suspension)	Report	2× (yellow card) 5× (suspension)	Salle Bir Challouf, Nabeul; Referees: Bord, Buy (FRA)

1 February 2005; 16:15	Germany	26–29	Croatia	Salle Bir Challouf, Nabeul; Referees: Baum, Góralczyk (POL)
1 February 2005; 16:15	Kehrmann 5	(11–15)	Lacković 11	Salle Bir Challouf, Nabeul; Referees: Baum, Góralczyk (POL)
1 February 2005; 16:15	2× (yellow card) 5× (suspension)	Report	2× (yellow card) 2× (suspension)	Salle Bir Challouf, Nabeul; Referees: Baum, Góralczyk (POL)

1 February 2005; 18:15	Serbia and Montenegro	28–28	Spain	Salle Bir Challouf, Nabeul; Referees: Vakula, Ljudovik (UKR)
1 February 2005; 18:15	Stojanović 7	(16–19)	Garralda 7	Salle Bir Challouf, Nabeul; Referees: Vakula, Ljudovik (UKR)
1 February 2005; 18:15	3× (yellow card) 6× (suspension)	Report	3× (yellow card) 4× (suspension)	Salle Bir Challouf, Nabeul; Referees: Vakula, Ljudovik (UKR)

1 February 2005; 20:15	Norway	34–31	Sweden	Salle Bir Challouf, Nabeul; Referees: Lauren, Nielsen (DEN)
1 February 2005; 20:15	Skjærvold 9	(14–15)	Ahlm 9	Salle Bir Challouf, Nabeul; Referees: Lauren, Nielsen (DEN)
1 February 2005; 20:15	4× (yellow card) 6× (suspension) 1× (red card)	Report	4× (yellow card) 6× (suspension)	Salle Bir Challouf, Nabeul; Referees: Lauren, Nielsen (DEN)

3 February 2005; 16:15	Sweden	22–27	Germany	Salle Bir Challouf, Nabeul; Referees: Dolejš, Kohout (CZE)
3 February 2005; 16:15	Andersson 7	(13–14)	Kehrmann 7	Salle Bir Challouf, Nabeul; Referees: Dolejš, Kohout (CZE)
3 February 2005; 16:15	3× (yellow card) 5× (suspension)	Report	3× (yellow card) 5× (suspension)	Salle Bir Challouf, Nabeul; Referees: Dolejš, Kohout (CZE)

3 February 2005; 18:15	Croatia	24–23	Serbia and Montenegro	Salle Bir Challouf, Nabeul; Referees: Lauren, Nielsen (DEN)
3 February 2005; 18:15	Balić, Džomba 6	(10–11)	Anđelković, Milosavljević 5	Salle Bir Challouf, Nabeul; Referees: Lauren, Nielsen (DEN)
3 February 2005; 18:15	3× (yellow card) 3× (suspension)	Report	3× (yellow card) 6× (suspension) 1× (red card)	Salle Bir Challouf, Nabeul; Referees: Lauren, Nielsen (DEN)

3 February 2005; 20:15	Spain	31–24	Norway	Salle Bir Challouf, Nabeul; Referees: Arnaldsson, Viðarsson (ISL)
3 February 2005; 20:15	Uríos 7	(15–12)	three players 5	Salle Bir Challouf, Nabeul; Referees: Arnaldsson, Viðarsson (ISL)
3 February 2005; 20:15	3× (yellow card) 5× (suspension)	Report	3× (yellow card) 3× (suspension) 1× (red card)	Salle Bir Challouf, Nabeul; Referees: Arnaldsson, Viðarsson (ISL)

== Placement matches ==
=== Eleventh place game ===
5 February 2005; 11:00	Slovenia	29–32	Sweden	Salle Bir Challouf, Nabeul; Referees: Dolejš, Kohout (CZE)
5 February 2005; 11:00	Rutenka 9	(14–17)	Petterson 7	Salle Bir Challouf, Nabeul; Referees: Dolejš, Kohout (CZE)
5 February 2005; 11:00	3× (yellow card) 5× (suspension) 1× (red card)	Report	3× (yellow card) 6× (suspension) 1× (red card)	Salle Bir Challouf, Nabeul; Referees: Dolejš, Kohout (CZE)

=== Ninth place game ===
5 February 2005; 13:00	Czech Republic	34–39	Germany	Salle Bir Challouf, Nabeul; Referees: Baum, Góralczyk (POL)
5 February 2005; 13:00	Bruna, Filip 8	(15–16)	Jansen 8	Salle Bir Challouf, Nabeul; Referees: Baum, Góralczyk (POL)
5 February 2005; 13:00	3× (yellow card) 3× (suspension)	Report	3× (yellow card) 3× (suspension)	Salle Bir Challouf, Nabeul; Referees: Baum, Góralczyk (POL)

=== Seventh place game ===
5 February 2005; 10:00	Russia	27–30	Norway	Hall 7th Novembre, Radès; Referees: Adjemian, Götz (ARG)
5 February 2005; 10:00	Koksharov 11	(15–14)	Hagen 7	Hall 7th Novembre, Radès; Referees: Adjemian, Götz (ARG)
5 February 2005; 10:00	3× (yellow card) 9× (suspension) 1× (red card)	Report	3× (yellow card) 6× (suspension)	Hall 7th Novembre, Radès; Referees: Adjemian, Götz (ARG)

=== Fifth place game ===
5 February 2005; 12:30	Greece	26–37	Serbia and Montenegro	Hall 7th Novembre, Radès; Referees: Arnaldsson, Viðarsson (ISL)
5 February 2005; 12:30	Karypidis 6	(12–15)	Stojanović 6	Hall 7th Novembre, Radès; Referees: Arnaldsson, Viðarsson (ISL)
5 February 2005; 12:30	3× (yellow card) 5× (suspension)	Report	3× (yellow card) 3× (suspension)	Hall 7th Novembre, Radès; Referees: Arnaldsson, Viðarsson (ISL)

== Final round ==
=== Bracket ===
Semi-finals
5 February 2005 – 15:00 (Radès)
Tunisia	30
Spain	33
5 February 2005 – 17:30 (Radès)
Croatia	35
France	32

Final
6 February 2005 – 17:30 (Radès)
Spain	40
Croatia	34
Bronze Match
6 February 2005 – 15:00 (Radès)
France	26
Tunisia	25

=== Semifinals ===
5 February 2005; 15:00	Tunisia	30–33	Spain	Hall 7th Novembre, Radès; Attendance: 14,000; Referees: Hansson, Olsson (SWE)
5 February 2005; 15:00	Hmam 9	(16–18)	Romero 8	Hall 7th Novembre, Radès; Attendance: 14,000; Referees: Hansson, Olsson (SWE)
5 February 2005; 15:00	3× (yellow card) 5× (suspension)	Report	3× (yellow card) 2× (suspension)	Hall 7th Novembre, Radès; Attendance: 14,000; Referees: Hansson, Olsson (SWE)

5 February 2005; 17:30	Croatia	35–32	France	Hall 7th Novembre, Radès; Attendance: 10,000; Referees: Vakula, Ljudovik (UKR)
5 February 2005; 17:30	Balić 8	(15–14)	Guigou 7	Hall 7th Novembre, Radès; Attendance: 10,000; Referees: Vakula, Ljudovik (UKR)
5 February 2005; 17:30	3× (yellow card) 5× (suspension)	Report	4× (yellow card) 4× (suspension)	Hall 7th Novembre, Radès; Attendance: 10,000; Referees: Vakula, Ljudovik (UKR)

=== Third place game ===
6 February 2005; 15:00	France	26–25	Tunisia	Hall 7th Novembre, Radès; Attendance: 13,500; Referees: Lauren, Nielsen (DEN)
6 February 2005; 15:00	Guigou 6	(10–14)	Hmam 11	Hall 7th Novembre, Radès; Attendance: 13,500; Referees: Lauren, Nielsen (DEN)
6 February 2005; 15:00	4× (yellow card) 2× (suspension)	Report	4× (yellow card) 8× (suspension) 4× (red card)	Hall 7th Novembre, Radès; Attendance: 13,500; Referees: Lauren, Nielsen (DEN)

=== Final ===
6 February 2005; 17:30	Spain	40–34	Croatia	Hall 7th Novembre, Radès; Attendance: 14,000; Referees: Lemme, Ullrich (GER)
6 February 2005; 17:30	García 11	(21–13)	Dzomba 7	Hall 7th Novembre, Radès; Attendance: 14,000; Referees: Lemme, Ullrich (GER)
6 February 2005; 17:30	3× (yellow card) 4× (suspension)	Report	3× (yellow card) 5× (suspension)	Hall 7th Novembre, Radès; Attendance: 14,000; Referees: Lemme, Ullrich (GER)

== Ranking and statistics ==
=== Final ranking ===
Rank	Team
Gold medal	Spain
Silver medal	Croatia
Bronze medal	France
4	Tunisia
5	Serbia and Montenegro
6	Greece
7	Norway
8	Russia
9	Germany
10	Czech Republic
11	Sweden
12	Slovenia
13	Denmark
14	Egypt
15	Iceland
16	Japan
17	Algeria
18	Argentina
19	Brazil
20	Angola
21	Qatar
22	Kuwait
23	Canada
24	Australia

Qualified for the 2007 World Men's Handball Championship

2005 Men's World Champions

Spain
First Title

Team roster: Jose Javier Hombrados, Alberto Entrerrios, Albert Rocas, Rubén Garabaya, Rolando Uríos, Mateo Garralda, Demetrio Lozano, Fernando Hernández, Juancho Pérez, David Barrufet, Juanín García, Iker Romero, Mariano Ortega, Chema Rodríguez.
Head coach: Juan Carlos Pastor.

=== All Star Team ===
- MVP: (Croatia) Ivano Balić
- Goalkeeper: (Serbia and Montenegro) Arpad Šterbik
- Left wing: (Russia) Eduard Koksharov
- Left back: (Tunisia) Wissem Hmam
- Centre back: (Croatia) Ivano Balić
- Right back: (Spain) Mateo Garralda
- Right wing: (Croatia) Mirza Džomba
- Pivot: (Czech Republic) David Juříček

=== Top goalscorers ===
Rank	Name	Team	Goals	Shots	%
1	Wissem Hmam	Tunisia	81	137	59
2	Eduard Koksharov	Russia	80	105	76
3	Mirza Dzomba	Croatia	65	84	74
4	Jan Filip	Czech Republic	58	100	58
4	Siarhei Rutenka	Slovenia	58	100	58
6	Juanín García	Spain	55	73	75
7	David Juříček	Czech Republic	51	65	78
8	Kristian Kjelling	Norway	50	84	60
9	Michaël Guigou	France	48	63	76
10	Florian Kehrmann	Germany	47	60	78

Source: IHF

=== Top goalkeepers ===
Rank	Name	Team	%	Saves	Shots
1	Birkir Ívar Guðmundsson	Iceland	42	27	65
1	Peter Larsen	Denmark	42	27	64
3	Daouda Karaboué	France	41	45	110
3	Aleksey Kostygov	Russia	41	69	169
3	Fredrik Ohlander	Sweden	41	58	140
6	Matías Schulz	Argentina	40	37	92
6	Gorazd Škof	Slovenia	40	92	232
8	José Javier Hombrados	Spain	38	66	172
9	Danijel Šarić	Serbia and Montenegro	37	45	123
9	Abdelmalek Slahdji	Algeria	37	22	59
9	Arpad Sterbik	Serbia and Montenegro	37	85	227
9	Tomas Svensson	Sweden	37	89	241

Source: IHF

== See also ==
- 2005 World Women's Handball Championship
