= Handball at the 2003 All-Africa Games – Men's tournament =

Handball at the 2003 All-Africa Games
Tournament details
- Host country: Nigeria
- Venue: 1 (in 1 host city)
- Dates: 5 – 14 October
- Teams: 8

Final positions
- Champions: Egypt (4th title)
- Runners-up: Algeria
- Third place: Nigeria
- Fourth place: Senegal

The Handball events at the 2003 All-Africa Games were held in Abuja, Nigeria from 5 to 14 October 2003.

== Qualified teams ==
Zone	Team
Hosts	Nigeria
Zone I	Algeria
Zone II	Senegal
Zone III	Ghana
Zone IV	Cameroon
Zone V	Egypt
Zone VI	South Africa
Zone VII	Madagascar (withdrew); DR Congo (replaces Madagascar)

== Group stage ==
All times are local (UTC+1).

Team advance to the knockout stage

=== Group A ===
Team	Pld	W	D	L	GF	GA	GD	Pts
Egypt	3	3	0	0	99	66	+33	6
Senegal	3	2	0	1	100	87	+13	4
Cameroon	3	1	0	2	84	90	−6	2
South Africa	3	0	0	3	53	93	−40	0

6 October 2003; 16:00	Senegal	37–15	South Africa	Abuja

6 October 2003; 20:00	Egypt	35–20	Cameroon	Abuja

8 October 2003; 16:00	Cameroon	34–20	South Africa	Abuja
8 October 2003; 16:00		(15–6)		Abuja

8 October 2003; 20:00	Egypt	42–28	Senegal	Abuja

10 October 2003; 16:00	Egypt	22–18	South Africa	Abuja

10 October 2003; 18:00	Senegal	35–30	Cameroon	Abuja

=== Group B ===
Team	Pld	W	D	L	GF	GA	GD	Pts
Algeria	3	3	0	0	86	50	+36	6
Nigeria	3	2	0	1	97	62	+35	4
Ghana	3	1	0	2	57	86	−29	2
DR Congo	3	0	0	3	53	93	−40	0

5 October 2003; 16:00	Ghana	24–19	DR Congo	Abuja
5 October 2003; 16:00		(12–8)		Abuja

5 October 2003; 20:00	Algeria	26–19	Nigeria	Abuja
5 October 2003; 20:00		(12–10)		Abuja

7 October 2003; 16:00	Algeria	31–18	DR Congo	Abuja

7 October 2003; 20:00	Nigeria	38–20	Ghana	Abuja
7 October 2003; 20:00		(19–10)		Abuja

9 October 2003; 16:00	Algeria	29–13	Ghana	Abuja

9 October 2003; 18:00	Nigeria	40–16	DR Congo	Abuja

== Classification matches ==
5–8th place bracket

Seventh place
11 October – Abuja
DR Congo	24
South Africa	19

Fifth place
11 October – Abuja
Cameroon	36
Ghana	25

=== 7–8th place match ===
11 October 2003; 16:00	DR Congo	24–19	South Africa	Abuja

=== 5–6th place match ===
11 October 2003; 20:00	Cameroon	36–25	Ghana	Abuja

== Knockout stage ==
Semifinals
12 October – Abuja
Egypt	27
Nigeria	21
12 October – Abuja
Algeria	27
Senegal	24

Final
13 October – Abuja
Egypt	31
Algeria	29
Third place
13 October – Abuja
Nigeria	35
Senegal	33

=== Semifinals ===
12 October 2003; 16:00	Egypt	27–21	Nigeria	Abuja

12 October 2003; 20:00	Algeria	27–24	Senegal	Abuja

=== Third place match ===
13 October 2003; 16:00	Nigeria	35–33	Senegal	Abuja

=== Final ===
13 October 2003; 20:00	Egypt	31–29	Algeria	Abuja

== Final standing ==
Pos	Team	Pld	W	D	L	Pts
Gold medal	Egypt	5	5	0	0	10
Silver medal	Algeria	5	4	0	1	8
Bronze medal	Nigeria	5	3	0	2	6
4	Senegal	5	2	0	3	4
5	Cameroon	4	2	0	2	4
6	Ghana	4	1	0	3	2
7	DR Congo	4	1	0	3	2
8	South Africa	4	0	0	4	0
