= 2004 African Men's Handball Championship =

International handball competition

2004 African Men's Championship
Tournament details
- Host country: Egypt
- Venues: 3 (in 1 host city)
- Dates: 8–18 April
- Teams: 11 (from 1 confederation)

Final positions
- Champions: Egypt (4th title)
- Runners-up: Tunisia
- Third place: Angola
- Fourth place: Algeria

Tournament statistics
- Matches played: 50
- Goals scored: 2,842 (56.84 per match)

The 2004 African Men's Handball Championship was the 16th edition of the African Men's Handball Championship, held in Cairo, Egypt, from 8 to 18 April 2004. It acted as the African qualifying tournament for the 2005 World Championship in Tunisia.

Egypt win their fourth title beating Tunisia in the final game 31–28.

== Qualified teams ==
- Algeria
- Angola
- Cameroon
- Congo
- DR Congo
- Egypt (hosts)
- Ivory Coast (withdrew)
- Kenya
- Libya
- Morocco
- Senegal
- Tunisia

== Venues ==
Cairo
Cairo Stadium Indoor Halls Complex
Main Hall	Media Hall
Capacity: 16,900	Capacity: 1,620
Cairo	2004 African Men's Handball Championship is located in Egypt
Police Union Hall	2004 African Men's Handball Championship is located in Egypt
Capacity: 2,000	2004 African Men's Handball Championship is located in Egypt

== First round ==
All times are local (UTC+2).

Team advance to the second round

=== Group A ===
Team	Pld	W	D	L	GF	GA	GD	Pts
Algeria	2	2	0	0	74	33	+41	4
Cameroon	2	1	0	1	49	45	+4	2
Kenya	2	0	0	2	40	85	−45	0
Ivory Coast (W)	0	0	0	0	0	0	0	0

(W) Withdrew

8 April 2004; 16:00	Algeria	51–18	Kenya	Media Hall, Cairo
8 April 2004; 16:00		(24–9)		Media Hall, Cairo

9 April 2004; 18:00	Cameroon	34–22	Kenya	Media Hall, Cairo
9 April 2004; 18:00		(8–9)		Media Hall, Cairo

10 April 2004; 16:00	Algeria	23–15	Cameroon	Media Hall, Cairo
10 April 2004; 16:00		(9–6)		Media Hall, Cairo

=== Group B ===
Team	Pld	W	D	L	GF	GA	GD	Pts
Egypt (H)	3	3	0	0	117	50	+67	6
Morocco	3	2	0	1	84	78	+6	4
DR Congo	3	1	0	2	68	100	−32	2
Congo	3	0	0	3	74	115	−41	0

(H) Hosts

8 April 2004; 16:00	Morocco	37–25	Congo	Main Hall, Cairo
8 April 2004; 16:00		(15–13)		Main Hall, Cairo

8 April 2004; 20:00	Egypt	39–15	DR Congo	Main Hall, Cairo
8 April 2004; 20:00		(19–7)		Main Hall, Cairo

9 April 2004; 17:00	Morocco	29–19	DR Congo	Main Hall, Cairo
9 April 2004; 17:00		(13–10)		Main Hall, Cairo

9 April 2004; 19:00	Egypt	44–17	Congo	Main Hall, Cairo
9 April 2004; 19:00		(20–6)		Main Hall, Cairo

10 April 2004; 17:00	DR Congo	34–32	Congo	Main Hall, Cairo
10 April 2004; 17:00		(13–11)		Main Hall, Cairo

10 April 2004; 19:00	Egypt	34–18	Morocco	Main Hall, Cairo
10 April 2004; 19:00		(17–7)		Main Hall, Cairo

=== Group C ===
Team	Pld	W	D	L	GF	GA	GD	Pts
Tunisia	3	3	0	0	107	64	+43	6
Angola	3	2	0	1	77	73	+4	4
Senegal	3	1	0	2	79	85	−6	2
Libya	3	0	0	3	57	98	−41	0

8 April 2004; 14:00	Angola	24–22	Senegal	Police Union Hall, Cairo
8 April 2004; 14:00		(12–13)		Police Union Hall, Cairo

8 April 2004; 16:00	Tunisia	35–17	Libya	Police Union Hall, Cairo
8 April 2004; 16:00		(19–7)		Police Union Hall, Cairo

9 April 2004; 17:00	Angola	32–17	Libya	Police Union Hall, Cairo
9 April 2004; 17:00		(16–8)		Police Union Hall, Cairo

9 April 2004; 19:00	Tunisia	38–26	Senegal	Police Union Hall, Cairo
9 April 2004; 19:00		(19–10)		Police Union Hall, Cairo

10 April 2004; 17:00	Senegal	31–23	Libya	Police Union Hall, Cairo
10 April 2004; 17:00		(16–10)		Police Union Hall, Cairo

8 April 2004; 19:00	Tunisia	34–21	Angola	Police Union Hall, Cairo
8 April 2004; 19:00		(18–11)		Police Union Hall, Cairo

== Second round ==
Team advance to the knockout stage

=== Group E ===
Team	Pld	W	D	L	GF	GA	GD	Pts
Egypt (H)	2	2	0	0	71	45	+26	4
Angola	2	1	0	1	53	61	−8	2
Cameroon	2	0	0	2	43	61	−18	0

(H) Hosts

12 April 2004; 19:00	Egypt	38–25	Angola	Main Hall, Cairo
12 April 2004; 19:00		(15–11)		Main Hall, Cairo

13 April 2004; 19:00	Angola	28–23	Cameroon	Main Hall, Cairo
13 April 2004; 19:00		(14–12)		Main Hall, Cairo

14 April 2004; 19:00	Egypt	33–20	Cameroon	Main Hall, Cairo
14 April 2004; 19:00		(13–8)		Main Hall, Cairo

=== Group F ===
Team	Pld	W	D	L	GF	GA	GD	Pts
Tunisia	2	2	0	0	71	54	+17	4
Algeria	2	1	0	1	60	50	+10	2
Morocco	2	0	0	2	44	71	−27	0

12 April 2004; 19:00	Tunisia	39–26	Morocco	Media Hall, Cairo
12 April 2004; 19:00		(23–14)		Media Hall, Cairo

13 April 2004; 19:00	Algeria	32–18	Morocco	Media Hall, Cairo
13 April 2004; 19:00		(16–9)		Media Hall, Cairo

14 April 2004; 19:00	Tunisia	32–28	Algeria	Media Hall, Cairo
14 April 2004; 19:00		(17–15)		Media Hall, Cairo

== Placement matches ==
=== Group 10–11th place ===
Team took tenth place
Team took eleventh place

Team	Pld	W	D	L	GF	GA	GD	Pts
Congo	1	1	0	0	28	18	+10	2
Libya	1	0	0	1	18	28	−10	0

12 April 2004; 15:00	Libya	18–28	Congo	Media Hall, Cairo
12 April 2004; 15:00		(8–13)		Media Hall, Cairo

=== Group 7–9th place ===
Team took seventh place
Team took the height place
Team took ninth place

Team	Pld	W	D	L	GF	GA	GD	Pts
Senegal	2	2	0	0	72	52	+20	4
DR Congo	2	1	0	1	67	67	0	2
Kenya	2	0	0	2	61	81	−20	0

12 April 2004; 17:00	Senegal	32–26	DR Congo	Media Hall, Cairo
12 April 2004; 17:00		(15–14)		Media Hall, Cairo

13 April 2004; 14:00	DR Congo	41–35	Kenya	Police Union Hall, Cairo
13 April 2004; 14:00		(17–20)		Police Union Hall, Cairo

14 April 2004; 14:00	Senegal	40–26	Kenya	Police Union Hall, Cairo
14 April 2004; 14:00		(18–12)		Police Union Hall, Cairo

== Knockout stage ==
Semifinals
16 April – Cairo
Tunisia	39
Angola	35
16 April – Cairo
Egypt	31
Algeria	24

Final
18 April – Cairo
Tunisia	28
Egypt	31
Third place
17 April – Cairo
Angola	31
Algeria	30

=== Semifinals ===
16 April 2004; 15:30	Tunisia	39–35	Angola
16 April 2004; 15:30		(17–18)

16 April 2004; 19:00	Egypt	31–24	Algeria
16 April 2004; 19:00		(16–14)

=== Fifth place game ===
17 April 2004; 13:00	Cameroon	36–30	Morocco
17 April 2004; 13:00		(20–11)

=== Third place game ===
17 April 2004; 17:30	Angola	31–30	Algeria
17 April 2004; 17:30		(15–16)

=== Final ===
18 April 2004; 18:00	Egypt	31–28	Tunisia
18 April 2004; 18:00		(20–12)

== Final ranking ==
Qualified for the 2005 World Championship
Qualified for the 2005 World Championship as hosts

Rank	Team
Gold medal	Egypt
Silver medal	Tunisia
Bronze medal	Angola
4	Algeria
5	Cameroon
6	Morocco
7	Senegal
8	DR Congo
9	Kenya
10	Congo
11	Libya

=== All Star Team ===
The All-star team and award winners were announced

Position	Player	Country
Goalkeeper	Hamada El-Ruby	Egypt
Right wing	Sherif Moemen	Egypt
Right back	Ahmed El-Ahmar	Egypt
Central back	Oualid Ben Amor	Tunisia
Left back	Belgacem Filah	Algeria
Left wing	Marcelino Nascimento	Angola
Pivot	Issam Tej	Tunisia

=== Topscorer ===
Tunisian Wissem Hmam and Egyptian Sherif Moemen are topscorer with 48 goals
