= Handball at the 1999 All-Africa Games – Men's tournament =

Handball at the 1999 All-Africa Games
Tournament details
- Host country: South Africa
- Venue: 1 (in 1 host city)
- Dates: 11 – 18 September
- Teams: 4

Final positions
- Champions: Algeria (4th title)
- Runners-up: Egypt
- Third place: Ghana
- Fourth place: South Africa

The Handball events at the 1999 All-Africa Games were held in Johannesburg, South Africa from 11 to 18 September 1999.

== Qualified teams ==
Zone	Team
Hosts	South Africa
Zone I	Algeria
Zone II	Ghana
Zone III	Nigeria (withdrew)
Zone IV	Cameroon (withdrew)
Zone V	Egypt
Zone VI	Zimbabwe (withdrew)
Zone VII	Madagascar (withdrew)

== Final tournament ==
All times are local (UTC+2).

=== Matches ===
==== Part 1 ====
11 September 1999; 12:00	Ghana	16–35	Egypt	Johannesburg; Referees: Dijkema & Kabamba (RSA)
11 September 1999; 12:00	Akrone 5	(10–16)	Tolba 10	Johannesburg; Referees: Dijkema & Kabamba (RSA)
11 September 1999; 12:00	3× (yellow card) 3× (suspension)	Report; Detail	3× (yellow card) 2× (suspension)	Johannesburg; Referees: Dijkema & Kabamba (RSA)

11 September 1999; 17:00	Algeria	34–13	South Africa	Johannesburg
11 September 1999; 17:00		(–)		Johannesburg

12 September 1999; 12:00	Algeria	30–13	Ghana	Johannesburg
12 September 1999; 12:00		(–)		Johannesburg

12 September 1999; 17:00	Egypt	56–15	South Africa	Johannesburg
12 September 1999; 17:00		(–)		Johannesburg

13 September 1999; 15:00	Egypt	21–31	Algeria	Johannesburg; Referees: Aime & Seye (SEN)
13 September 1999; 15:00	Zaky 7	(9–13)	Hamad 9	Johannesburg; Referees: Aime & Seye (SEN)
13 September 1999; 15:00	2× (yellow card) 8× (suspension)	Report; Detail	1× (yellow card) 9× (suspension) 3× (red card)	Johannesburg; Referees: Aime & Seye (SEN)

13 September 1999; 19:00	South Africa	24–18	Ghana	Johannesburg
13 September 1999; 19:00		(–)		Johannesburg

==== Part 2 ====
16 September 1999; 10:00	Algeria	37–15	South Africa	Johannesburg
16 September 1999; 10:00		(–)		Johannesburg

16 September 1999; 19:00	Egypt	37–24	Ghana	Johannesburg; Referees: Doumbia & Gbela (CIV)
16 September 1999; 19:00	Abdel Wahab 8	(19–10)	Asare 7	Johannesburg; Referees: Doumbia & Gbela (CIV)
16 September 1999; 19:00	8× (suspension)	Report	13× (suspension)	Johannesburg; Referees: Doumbia & Gbela (CIV)

- +5 Yellow cards

17 September 1999; 17:00	South Africa	22–53	Egypt	Johannesburg; Referees: Doumbia & Gbela (CIV)
17 September 1999; 17:00	H. Miyelani & Moolman 4	(11–28)	Khalifa 11	Johannesburg; Referees: Doumbia & Gbela (CIV)
17 September 1999; 17:00	3× (yellow card) 6× (suspension)	Report; Detail	3× (yellow card) 1× (suspension)	Johannesburg; Referees: Doumbia & Gbela (CIV)

17 September 1999; 19:00	Algeria	28–16	Ghana	Johannesburg
17 September 1999; 19:00		(–)		Johannesburg

18 September 1999; 15:00	Ghana	21–13	South Africa	Johannesburg
18 September 1999; 15:00		(19–10)		Johannesburg

18 September 1999; 19:00	Algeria	21–24	Egypt	Johannesburg; Referees: Moelle & Mvoula (CGO)
18 September 1999; 19:00	Lamali 6	(12–10)	Zaky 7	Johannesburg; Referees: Moelle & Mvoula (CGO)
18 September 1999; 19:00	5× (suspension)	Report	1× (suspension)	Johannesburg; Referees: Moelle & Mvoula (CGO)

- +4 Yellow cards

=== Tournament classification ===
Rank	Team	Pld	W	D	L	GF	GA	GD	Pts
Gold medal	Algeria	6	5	0	1	181	102	+7	10
Silver medal	Egypt	6	5	0	1	226	129	–7	10
Bronze medal	Ghana	6	1	0	5	108	167	+2	2
4	South Africa	6	1	0	5	102	219	–2	2

NB: Egypt participated by junior team U19
