= Handball at the 2011 African Games – Men's tournament =

Handball at the 2011 African Games Men's tournament
Tournament details
- Host country: Mozambique
- Venue: 1 (in 1 host city)
- Dates: 08–17 September 2011
- Teams: 11

Final positions
- Champions: Egypt (6th title)
- Runners-up: Angola
- Third place: Algeria
- Fourth place: Senegal

The 2011 edition of the Women's Handball Tournament of the African Games was the 8th, organized by the African Handball Confederation and played under the auspices of the International Handball Federation, the handball sport governing body. The tournament ran from September 8–17, 2011 in Maputo, Mozambique, contested by 12 national teams and won by Egypt.

== Participating teams ==
- Angola
- Algeria
- Cameroon
- Congo
- Egypt
- Gabon
- Ghana
- Kenya
- Mozambique
- Madagascar
- Nigeria
- Senegal

== Preliminary round ==
The draw was held on May 6, 2011.

=== Group A ===
Team	Pld	W	D	L	GF	GA	GD	Pts
Cameroon	2	2	0	0	65	41	+24	4
Mozambique	2	1	0	1	54	51	+3	2
Madagascar	2	0	0	2	42	69	−27	0

8 September 2011; 09:00	Mozambique	34 – 21	Madagascar
8 September 2011; 09:00		(17–11)

9 September 2011; 09:00	Mozambique	20 – 30	Cameroon
9 September 2011; 09:00		(10–18)

10 September 2011; 13:00	Madagascar	21 – 35	Cameroon
10 September 2011; 13:00		(9–19)

=== Group B ===
Team	Pld	W	D	L	GF	GA	GD	Pts
Algeria	2	1	0	1	56	50	+6	2
Senegal	2	1	0	1	50	53	−3	2
Gabon	2	1	0	1	48	51	−3	2

8 September 2011; 11:00	Algeria	31 – 24	Senegal
8 September 2011; 11:00		(16–11)

9 September 2011; 11:00	Algeria	25 – 26	Gabon
9 September 2011; 11:00		(12–12)

10 September 2011; 15:00	Senegal	26 – 22	Gabon
10 September 2011; 15:00		(10–12)

=== Group C ===
Team	Pld	W	D	L	GF	GA	GD	Pts
Egypt	2	2	0	0	53	29	+24	4
Congo	2	1	0	1	45	44	+1	2
Ghana	2	0	0	2	34	59	−25	0

8 September 2011; 13:00	Egypt	24 – 15	Congo
8 September 2011; 13:00		(13–5)

10 September 2011; 09:00	Egypt	29 – 14	Ghana
10 September 2011; 09:00		(14–5)

11 September 2011; 13:00	Congo	30 – 20	Ghana
11 September 2011; 13:00		(14–9)

=== Group D ===
Team	Pld	W	D	L	GF	GA	GD	Pts
Angola	2	2	0	0	52	41	+11	4
Nigeria	2	1	0	1	49	44	+5	2
Kenya	2	0	0	2	39	55	−16	0

8 September 2011; 15:00	Angola	25 – 21	Nigeria
8 September 2011; 15:00		(11–9)

10 September 2011; 11:00	Angola	27 – 20	Kenya
10 September 2011; 11:00		(16–5)

11 September 2011; 15:00	Nigeria	28 – 19	Kenya
11 September 2011; 15:00		(13–9)

== Knockout stage ==
=== Championship bracket ===
Quarter-finals
Cameroon	23
Senegal	25
Angola	25
Congo	21
Algeria	36
Mozambique	16
Egypt	34
Nigeria	25

Semi-finals
Senegal	19
Angola	28
Algeria	17
Egypt	22

Final
Angola	20
Egypt	24
Third place
Senegal	24
Algeria	25

==== Quarterfinals ====
13 September 2011; 13:00	Cameroon	23 – 25	Senegal
13 September 2011; 13:00		(14–13)

13 September 2011; 15:00	Algeria	36 – 16	Mozambique
13 September 2011; 15:00		(18–8)

13 September 2011; 17:00	Egypt	34 – 25	Nigeria
13 September 2011; 17:00		(18–9)

13 September 2011; 19:00	Angola	25 – 21	Congo
13 September 2011; 19:00		(14–11)

==== Semifinals ====
15 September 2011; 18:00	Senegal	19 – 28	Angola
15 September 2011; 18:00		(11–15)

15 September 2011; 19:30	Algeria	17 – 22	Egypt
15 September 2011; 19:30		(8–8)

==== Third place game ====
17 September 2011; 11:00	Senegal	24 – 25	Algeria
17 September 2011; 11:00		(10–11)

==== Final ====
17 September 2011; 18:00	Angola	20 – 24	Egypt
17 September 2011; 18:00		(13–9)

=== 5–8th place bracket ===
Semifinals
Cameroon	20
Congo	18
Mozambique	21
Nigeria	50

Fifth place
Cameroon	23
Nigeria	26
Seventh place
Congo	33
Mozambique	26

==== Semifinals ====
15 September 2011; 08:00	Cameroon	20 – 18	Congo
15 September 2011; 08:00		(9–11)

15 September 2011; 09:30	Mozambique	21 – 50	Nigeria
15 September 2011; 09:30		(7–23)

==== Seventh place game ====
16 September 2011; 09:00	Congo	33 – 26	Mozambique
16 September 2011; 09:00		(16–11)

==== Fifth place game ====
16 September 2011; 16:00	Cameroon	23 – 26	Nigeria
16 September 2011; 16:00		(12–16)

=== 9–12th place bracket ===
9−12th classification
Gabon	41
Madagascar	27
Kenya	33
Ghana	31

Ninth place
Gabon	29
Kenya	21
Eleventh place
Madagascar	28
Ghana	23

==== Semifinals ====
12 September 2011; 13:00	Gabon	41 – 27	Madagascar
12 September 2011; 13:00		(20–13)

12 September 2011; 15:00	Kenya	33 – 31	Ghana
12 September 2011; 15:00		(16–13)

==== Eleventh place game ====
13 September 2011; 09:00	Madagascar	28 – 23	Ghana
13 September 2011; 09:00		(13–10)

==== Ninth place game ====
13 September 2011; 11:00	Gabon	29 – 21	Kenya
13 September 2011; 11:00		(15–11)

== Final standings ==
Rank	Men			
Rank	Team	Pld	W	L
1st place, gold medalist(s)	Egypt	5	5	0
2nd place, silver medalist(s)	Angola	5	4	1
3rd place, bronze medalist(s)	Algeria	5	3	2
4.	Senegal	5	2	3
Eliminated at the quarterfinals
5.	Nigeria	5	3	2
6.	Cameroon	5	2	3
7.	Congo	5	2	3
8.	Mozambique	5	1	4
Preliminary round 3rd placers
9.	Gabon	4	3	1
10.	Kenya	4	1	3
11.	Madagascar	4	1	3
12.	Ghana	4	0	4

2011 African Games Men's Handball winner

Egypt
Sixth title

== See also ==
- Handball at the 2011 All-Africa Games – Women's tournament
