= Wissem Hmam =

Tunisian handball player (born 1981)

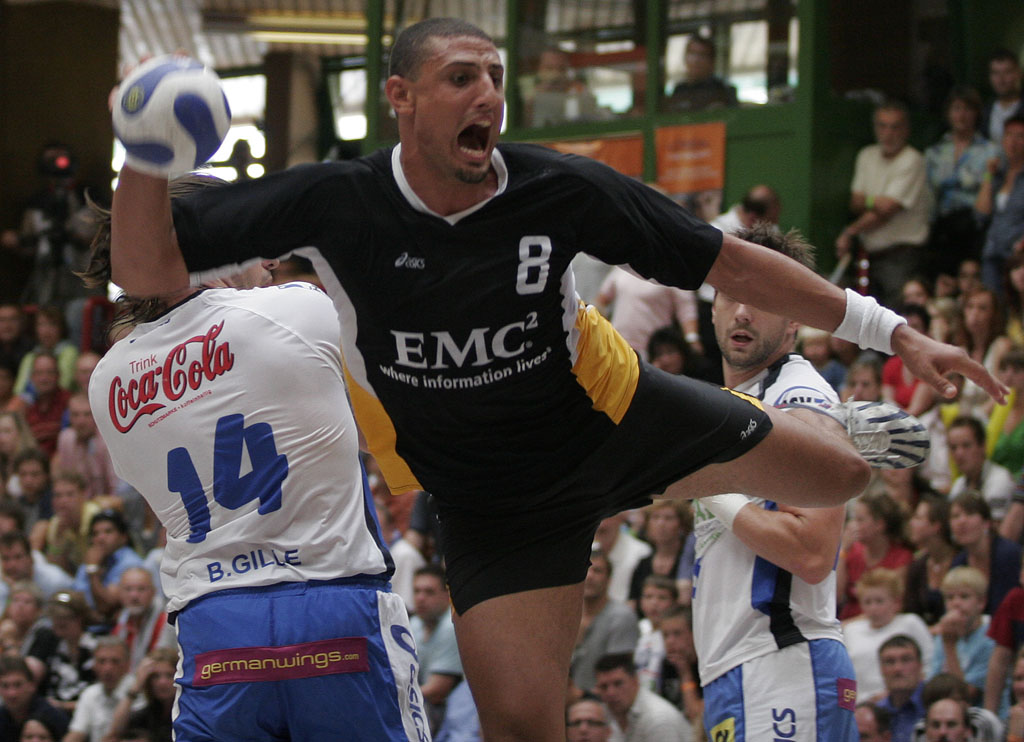
- Hmam in 2007

Personal information
- Nationality: Tunisian
- Born: 21 April 1981 (age 45) Menzel Temime, Tunisia
- Height: 1.98 m (6 ft 6 in)

Sport
- Sport: Handball
- Position: Left back

Youth career
- Years: Team
- 1995–1999: US Témimienne

Senior clubs
- Years: Team
- 2000–2001: US Témimienne
- 2001–2005: ES de Tunis
- 2005: → Al Wehda (loan)
- 2005–2014: Montpellier AHB
- 2012: → Al Sadd (loan)
- 2014–2018: Saint-Raphaël VHB
National team
Years	Team	Apps	(Gls)
1999–2015	Tunisia	235	(761)
Medal record
Men's handball
Representing Tunisia
African Championship
Gold medal – first place	2002 Morocco	Team
Silver medal – second place	2004 Egypt	Team
Gold medal – first place	2006 Tunisia	Team
Silver medal – second place	2008 Angola	Team
Gold medal – first place	2010 Egypt	Team
Gold medal – first place	2012 Morocco	Team
Silver medal – second place	2014 Algeria	Team
Mediterranean Games
Silver medal – second place	2001 Tunisia	Team
Bronze medal – third place	2005 Spain	Team

Wissem Hmam (Arabic: وسام حمام; born 21 April 1981) is a Tunisian former handball player. Hmam was ranked as the top scorer in the 2005 World Championship, scoring a total of 81 goals and helping Tunisia reach the semifinals in the 2005 World Men's Handball Championship in Tunis. Following his retirement, he became the assistant coach of Rareș Fortuneanu at Saint-Raphaël VHB from 2019 to 2022. In June 2024, he joined ASPTT Mulhouse-Rixheim as a coach.

== Honours ==
Club

ES de Tunis

- Tunisian Handball League: 2003–04, 2004–05
- Tunisian Handball Cup: 2001–02, 2004–05
- Tunisian Handball Super Cup: 2002
- African Handball Cup Winners' Cup: 2003

Al Wehda

- Saudi Handball Cup: 2005

Montpellier AHB

- LNH Division 1: 2005–06, 2007–08, 2008–09, 2009–10, 2010–11, 2011–12
- Coupe de France: 2005–06, 2007–08, 2008–09, 2009–10, 2011–12, 2012–13
- Coupe de la Ligue: 2005–06, 2006–07, 2007–08, 2009–10, 2010–11, 2011–12, 2013–14
- Trophée des Champions: 2010, 2011

International

Tunisia

- African Championship: 2002, 2006, 2010, 2012; runner-up 2004, 2008, 2014

Individual

- Best left back and top scorer of the 2005 World Championship
- Best left back in the LNH Division 1 in 2005–06
- Best Tunisian sportsman in 2005
- Top scorer of the 2006 Handball World Cup
- Best left back in the 2008 African Championship
