= Mohamed Sharaf El-Din =

Egyptian handball player

Mohamed Sharaf El-Din, also named Mohamed (Hamada) El-Ruby (born December 23, 1974) is an Egyptian handball player. As a goalkeeper, he competed for Egypt's national team at the 2000 and 2004 Summer Olympics. He also finished 4th at the 2001 World Championship and won several medals at African Championships. At the 2004 African Championship, he won gold medal and has been elected best goalkeeper.

He played for Egyptian top club Zamalek SC and has been appointed as a goalkeeper coach in the same club until 2017.
