= Jason Hoppner =

Australian handball player and coach

Jason Hoppner (born 5 August 1975) is a former member of the Australia men's national handball team (1995-2011) and former coach of the Australia women's national handball team (2013 - 2015).

Prior to coaching the National Women's Team, Hoppner coached the National U20 Men's Team for 4 years leading the team to victory at both the 2010 (Australia) and 2012 (Samoa) IHF Oceania Challenge Trophy. In 2013, Tte team competed at the IHF Challenge Trophy in Mexico.

In 2013, Hoppner was appointed Women's National Team Coach and participated at the Handball World Championships in Serbia.

As a player, Hoppner competed at the 2005 and 2011 Handball World Championships. Between the years 1998 and 2002 he played in Hungary for the handball teams Csomor (NB1B), Szazhallombatta (NB1) & BP Honved (NB2).
