= Sousse Indoor Sports Hall =

Arena in Sousse, Tunisia

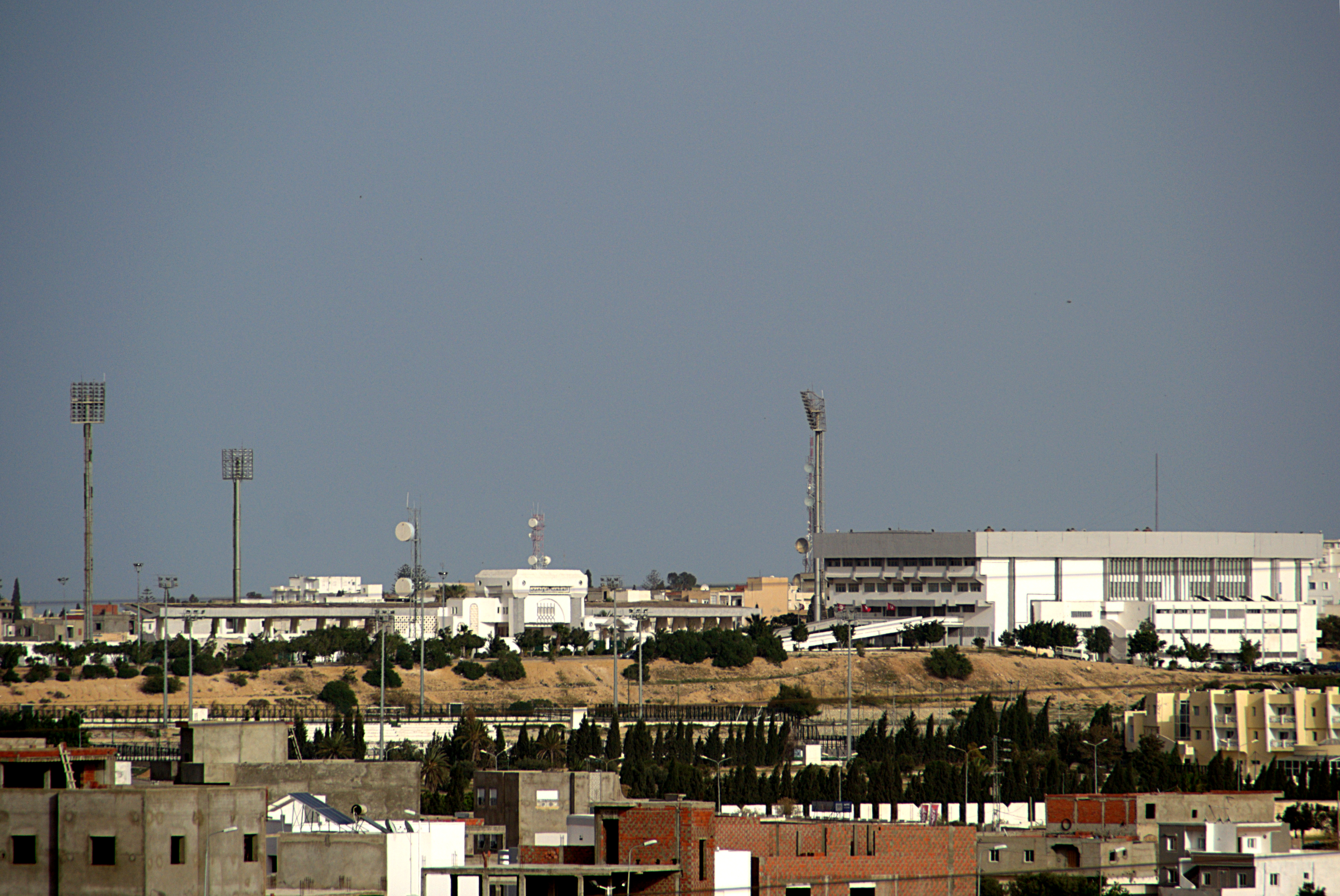
- Exterior view of the hall (far right)
- Interactive map of Sousse Indoor Sports Hall
- Full name: Sousse Olympic Indoor Sports Hall
- Location: Sousse, Tunisia
- Coordinates: 35°49′24″N 10°36′46″E
- Owner: Government of Tunisia
- Capacity: 5,000

Construction
- Opened: 1987
- Renovated: 2005

Tenant
- Étoile du Sahel

The Sousse Olympic Indoor Sports Hall (Arabic: القاعة الأولمبية بسوسة) is an indoor sporting arena located in Sousse, Tunisia. The Hall is the Home of the Étoile Sportive du Sahel commons sections including Handball, Basketball, Volleyball The capacity of the arena is 5,000 spectators.

== Events ==
The Sousse Olympic Hall is used for many Sports disciplines like Volleyball, Basketball, Handball, Martial Arts. The Sousse Hall was built specifically for the Étoile Sportive du Sahel to host all club's sections. The Olympic Hall also contributed to hosting Tunisia for international competitions for national teams, as it was among the halls that hosted the 2005 World Men's Handball Championship, in addition to Tunisia hosting the 2013 Men's African Volleyball Championship through the Sousse Indoor Sports Hall.

== See also ==
- List of indoor arenas in Tunisia
