= South African Handball Federation =

Federation governing handball in South Africa

South African Handball Federation SAHF
- IOC nation: South Africa
- Sport: Handball
- Other sports: Beach Handball; Wheelchair handball
- Official website: www.sahf.co.za

HISTORY
- Year of formation: 1993

AFFILIATIONS
- International federation: International Handball Federation (IHF)
- IHF member since: 1993
- Continental association: African Handball Confederation
- National Olympic Committee: South African Sports Confederation and Olympic Committee
- Other affiliation(s): Commonwealth Handball Association

GOVERNING BODY
- President: Ms Nompumeleo NTSHANGASE (South Africa)

HEADQUARTERS
- Address: 108 Turffontein Road, Glenesk, 2190 Johannesburg, Gauteng
- Country: South Africa
- Secretary General: Ms Zizo PAPU

The South African Handball Federation (SAHF) is the governing body for handball in South Africa and is responsible for the administration of the South African national handball teams (both men's and women's). SAHF has been an affiliate of International Handball Federation, African Handball Confederation and Commonwealth Handball Association since 1993, and its offices are located in Johannesburg, the elected president is Ally Pole. SAHF is registered with SASCOC as the officially recognised federation.

== See also ==
- South Africa men's national handball team
- South Africa women's national handball team
