= Abdelmalek Slahdji =

Algerian handball player (born 1983)

Personal information
- Nationality: Algerian
- Born: 8 August 1983 (age 43) Algiers, Algeria
- Height: 1.94 m (6 ft 4 in)

Sport
- Sport: Handball
- Position: Goalkeeper
- Current club: Hyères OS
- Number: 1

Senior clubs
- Years: Team
- 1999–2001: US Biskra
- 2001–2005: Widad Amel Rouiba
- 2005–2019: MC Alger
- 2014: → Al-Qurain
- 2014: → Al Sadd SC
- 2016: → ES Tunis
- 2019–2021: Al Duhail
- 2021–2025: Amiens HB
- 2022: → Mudhar
- 2025–: Hyères OS
National team
Years	Team	Apps	(Gls)
2002–2015	Algeria	115	(1)

Abdelmalek Slahdji (born 8 August 1983) is an Algerian handball player for the French club Hyères OS. He plays as a goalkeeper.

He competed for the Algerian national team at the 2015 World Men's Handball Championship in Qatar.

He also participated in the 2003, 2005 and 2011 World Championships.
