= Ghana men's national handball team =

Ghana

Information
- Association: Handball Association of Ghana

Colours
1st	2nd

Results

African Games
- Appearances: 3+1 (First in 1999)
- Best result: 3rd
- Last updated on Unknown.

The Ghana men's national handball team is the national men's handball team of Ghana.

== International record ==
Ghana qualified three times for African Games

- in 1999
- 6th in 2003
- 12th in 2011
- 7th in 2023

Ghana never qualified for African Championship
