= El Hadi Biloum =

Algerian handball player (born 1981)

Personal information
- Nationality: Algerian
- Born: 26 May 1981 (age 45)
- Height: 1.92 m (6 ft 4 in)

Sport
- Sport: Handball
- Position: Right back
- Current club: Retired
National team
Years	Team	Apps	(Gls)
2000-2015	Algeria	75	(245)

El Hadi Biloum (born 26 May 1981) is an Algerian handball player for Martigues Handball.

He competed for the Algerian national team at the 2015 World Men's Handball Championship in Qatar.

He also participated at the 2003 and 2005 World Championships.
