= Salle Omnisport de Radès =

Indoor arena in Tunisia

Sports Hall of Radès
- Radès Arena
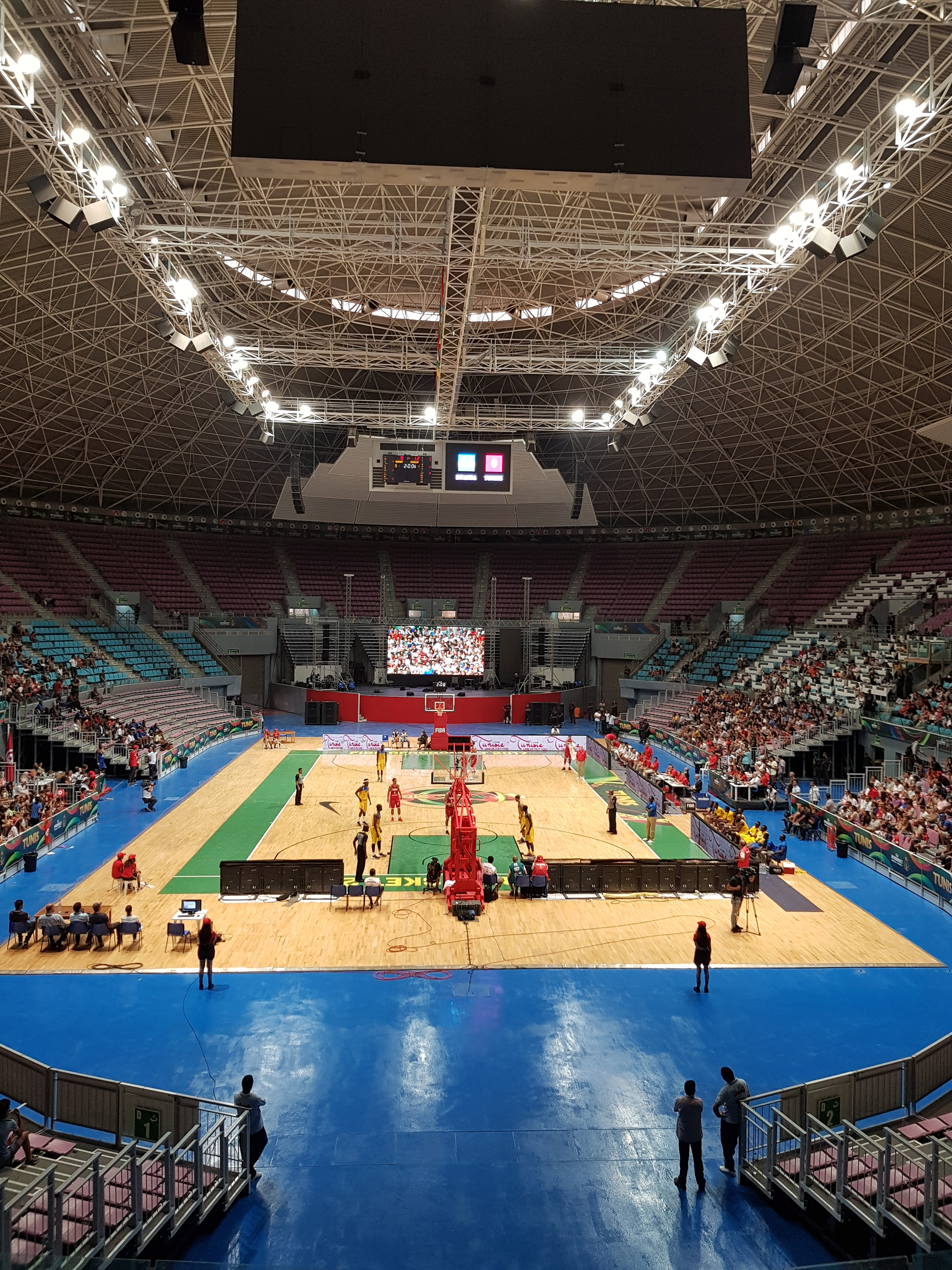
- Interactive map of Sports Hall of Radès
- Former names: 7th November Hall (2005–2011)
- Location: Radès, Tunisia
- Coordinates: 36°44′44″N 10°16′9″E
- Owner: Government of Tunisia
- Capacity: 17,000

Construction
- Opened: January 2005
- Expanded: 2014–2015
- Cost: 45 million Dinar

The Sports Hall of Radès (French: Salle Omnisport de Radès), formerly known as 7 November Hall, is an indoor sporting arena used mostly for basketball located in Radès, Tunisia. The capacity of the arena is 17,000 spectators.

== History ==
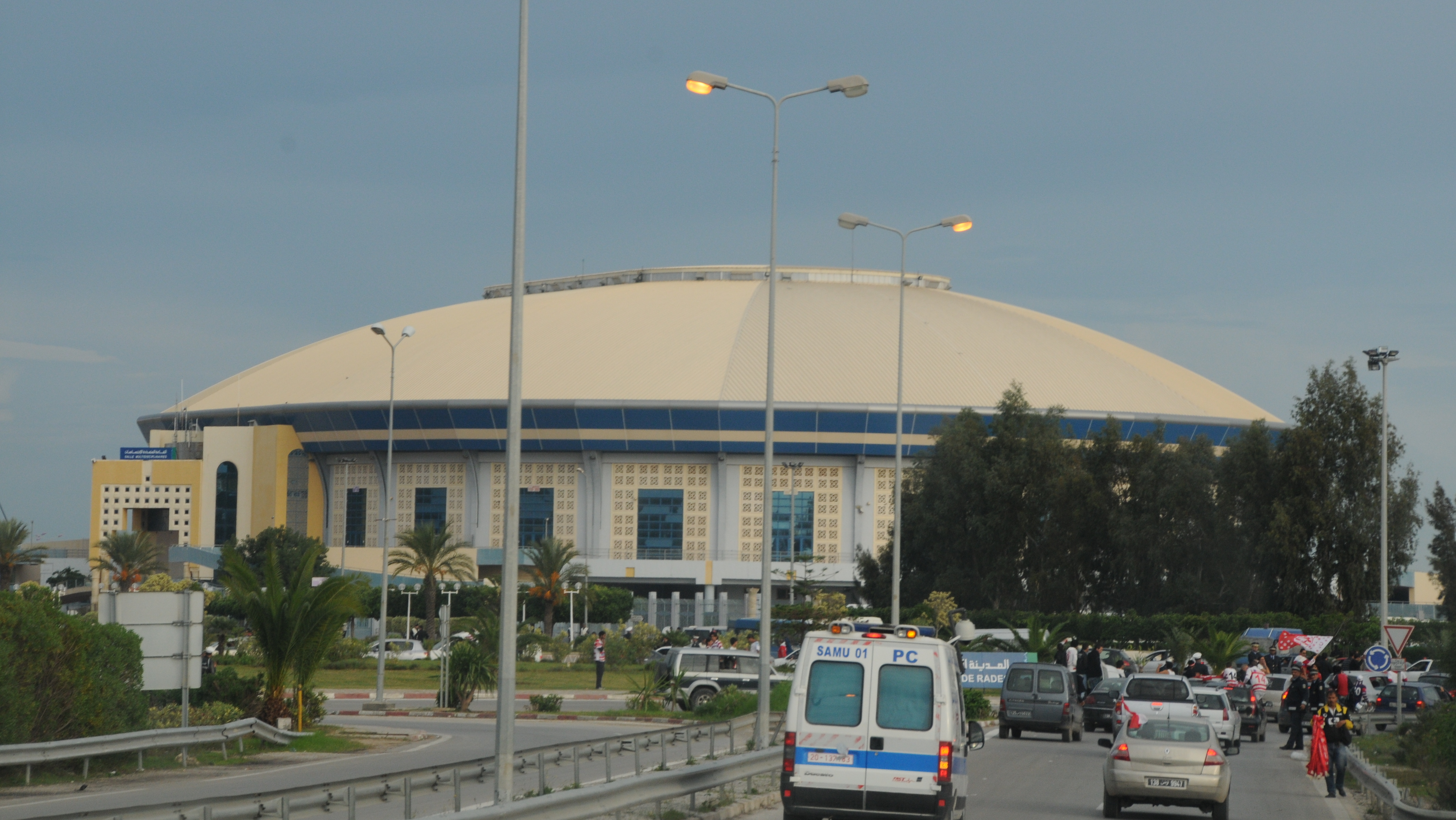
Radès Arena exterior view (2011)

At the time of its creation, the installation is named Hall of 7 November, the date that Zine El Abidine Ben Ali assumed the Presidency on 7 November 1987 in a bloodless coup d'état that ousted President Habib Bourguiba. but, following his ousting, it takes the name of Sports Hall of Radès (Salle Omnisport de Radès).

The area of the hall is approximately 2,706 square meters and is 82 meters long and 33 meters wide. It was expanded in 2014 to 17,000 spectators, and reopened in July 2015; it hosted all the matches of the AfroBasket 2015.

== Events ==
Built for the 2005 World Men's Handball Championship, the 14,000-seater venue hosted 2005 World Men's Handball Championship matches as well as those of the 2006 African Men's Handball Championship and the Tunisia Cup final of Handball, Basketball and Volleyball.

On 30 June 2017, FIBA Africa announced that Tunisia and Senegal would host the AfroBasket 2017. In fact, the hall hosted 20 of the 32 matches of the tournament.

It hosted also 25 of the 52 matches of the 2020 African Men's Handball Championship.

== See also ==
- National Stadium of Rades
- List of indoor arenas in Tunisia

Preceded by Pavilhão Atlântico; Lisbon	World Men's Handball Championship; Final Venue; 2005	Succeeded by Lanxess Arena; Cologne
