= Belgacem Filah =

Algerian handball player (born 1981)

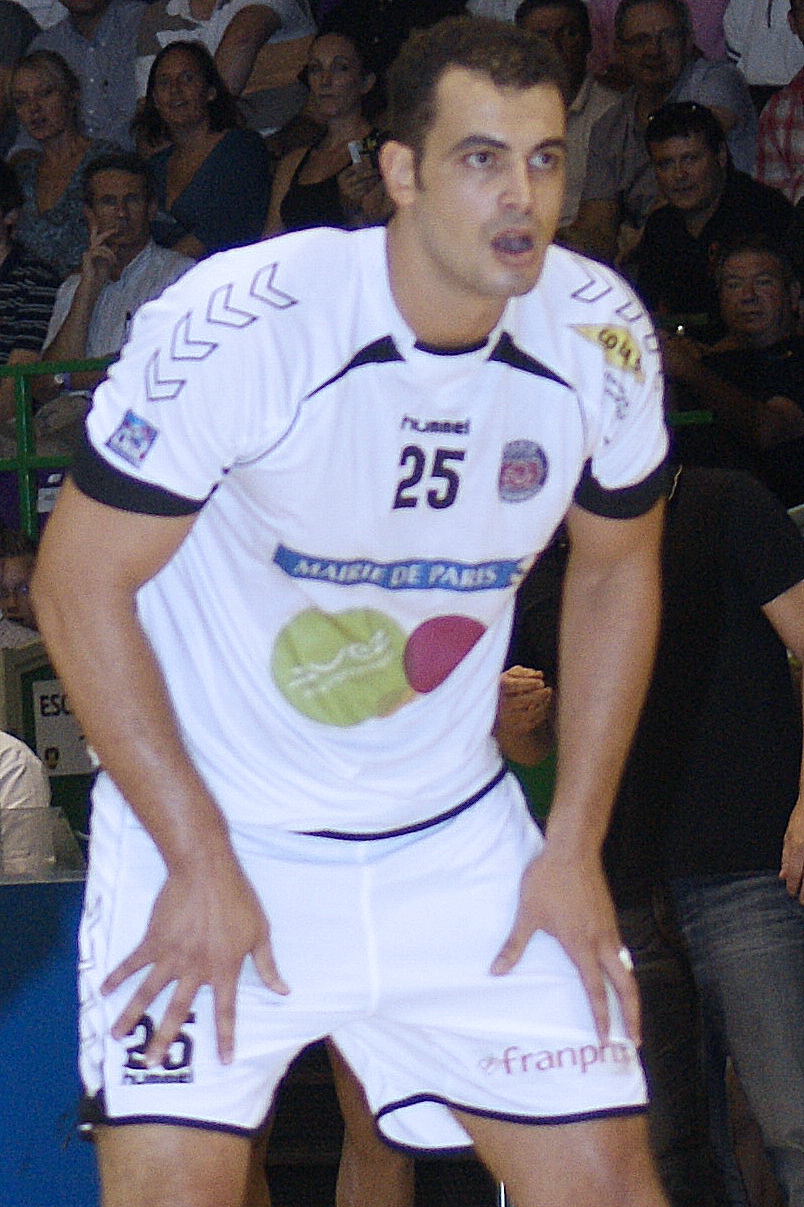
- Filah in 2014

Personal information
- Nationality: Algerian
- Born: 22 May 1981 (age 45)
- Height: 1.97 m (6 ft 6 in)

Sport
- Sport: Handball
- Position: Left back
- Current club: Retired

Senior clubs
- Years: Team
- 2000–2003: MC Alger
- 2003–2004: US Creteil
- 2004–2004: CB Ademar León
- 2004–2005: MC Alger
- 2005–2012: Paris HB
- 2012–2014: Al Nasr, Dubai
- 2014–2016: GS Pétroliers
- 2016–2018: Valence Handball
National team
Years	Team	Apps	(Gls)
2000–2015	Algeria	80	(120)

Belgacem Filah (born 22 May 1981) is an Algerian former handball player for GS Pétroliers.

He competed for the Algerian national team at the 2015 World Men's Handball Championship in Qatar.

He also participated at the 2003 and 2005 World Championships.
