= 1998 African Men's Handball Championship =

1998 African Men's Championship
Tournament details
- Host country: South Africa
- Venue: 1 (in 1 host city)
- Dates: 19–28 October
- Teams: 10 (from 1 confederation)

Final positions
- Champions: Tunisia (5th title)
- Runners-up: Algeria
- Third place: Egypt
- Fourth place: Nigeria

Tournament statistics
- Matches played: 27
- Goals scored: 1,176 (43.56 per match)

The 1998 African Men's Handball Championship was the 13th edition of the African Men's Handball Championship, held in Johannesburg, South Africa, from 19 to 28 October 1998. It acted as the African qualifying tournament for the 1999 World Championship in Egypt.

Tunisia win their fifth title beating Algeria in the final game 22–17.

== Qualified teams ==
- Algeria
- Angola
- Cameroon
- Congo
- Egypt
- Ivory Coast
- Morocco
- Nigeria
- South Africa (hosts)
- Tunisia

== Venue ==
Johannesburg	1998 African Men's Handball Championship is located in South Africa
Ellis Park Arena	1998 African Men's Handball Championship is located in South Africa
Capacity: 6,300	1998 African Men's Handball Championship is located in South Africa

== Group stage ==
Team advance to the knockout stage

=== Group A ===
Team	Pld	W	D	L	GF	GA	GD	Pts
Egypt	4	4	0	0	152	65	+87	8
Algeria	4	3	0	1	124	70	+54	6
Congo	4	2	0	2	90	102	−12	4
Ivory Coast	4	1	0	3	86	110	−24	2
South Africa (H)	4	0	0	4	57	162	−105	0

(H) Hosts

19 October 1998	Congo	34–14	South Africa	Johannesburg

20 October 1998	Algeria	31–14	Ivory Coast	Johannesburg

20 October 1998	Egypt	34–11	Congo	Johannesburg

21 October 1998	Ivory Coast	34–20	South Africa	Johannesburg

21 October 1998	Algeria	31–21	Congo	Johannesburg

22 October 1998	Egypt	57–14	South Africa	Johannesburg

23 October 1998	Algeria	37–9	South Africa	Johannesburg

23 October 1998	Egypt	35–15	Ivory Coast	Johannesburg

24 October 1998	Egypt	26–25	Algeria	Johannesburg

24 October 1998	Congo	24–23	Ivory Coast	Johannesburg

=== Group B ===
Team	Pld	W	D	L	GF	GA	GD	Pts
Nigeria	4	3	1	0	88	73	+15	7
Tunisia	4	3	0	1	100	80	+20	6
Morocco	4	2	0	2	83	88	−5	4
Angola	4	0	2	2	90	99	−9	2
Cameroon	4	0	1	3	61	82	−21	1

18 October 1998	Morocco	20–18	Angola	Johannesburg

19 October 1998	Nigeria	10–0	Cameroon	Johannesburg

Cameroon arrived late.

20 October 1998	Nigeria	28–24	Tunisia	Johannesburg
20 October 1998		(14–11)		Johannesburg

20 October 1998	Angola	23–23	Cameroon	Johannesburg

22 October 1998	Nigeria	22–21	Morocco	Johannesburg

22 October 1998	Tunisia	24–14	Cameroon	Johannesburg

23 October 1998	Tunisia	28–21	Angola	Johannesburg

23 October 1998	Morocco	25–24	Cameroon	Johannesburg

24 October 1998	Tunisia	24–17	Morocco	Johannesburg

24 October 1998	Nigeria	28–28	Angola	Johannesburg

== Knockout stage ==
Semifinals
26 October – Johannesburg
Egypt	23
Tunisia	26
26 October – Johannesburg
Nigeria	21
Algeria	32

Final
28 October – Johannesburg
Tunisia	22
Algeria	17
Third place
27 October – Johannesburg
Egypt	35
Nigeria	26

=== Semifinals ===
26 October 1998	Egypt	23–26	Tunisia	Johannesburg

26 October 1998	Nigeria	21–32	Algeria	Johannesburg

=== Ninth place game ===
25 October 1998	South Africa	18–41	Cameroon	Johannesburg

=== Seventh place game ===
25 October 1998	Ivory Coast	27–21	Angola	Johannesburg

=== Fifth place game ===
25 October 1998	Morocco	25–23	Congo	Johannesburg

=== Third place game ===
27 October 1998	Egypt	35–26	Nigeria	Johannesburg

=== Final ===
28 October 1998	Tunisia	22–17	Algeria	Johannesburg

== Final ranking ==
Team qualified for the 1999 World Championship
Team qualified for the 1999 World Championship as hosts

Rank	Team
Gold medal	Tunisia
Silver medal	Algeria
Bronze medal	Egypt
4	Nigeria
5	Morocco
6	Congo
7	Ivory Coast
8	Angola
9	Cameroon
10	South Africa
