= Kenya men's national handball team =

National handball team of Kenya

Kenya

Information
- Association: Kenya Handball Federation
- Captain: Bryan Mathews; Peter Mwathi

Colours
1st	2nd

Results

African Championship
- Appearances: 5 (First in 2004)
- Best result: 9th (2004)
- Last updated on Unknown.

The Kenya national handball team is the national handball team of Kenya and is governed by the Kenya Handball Federation.

== Results ==
=== African Championship ===
- 2004 – 9th
- 2016 – 12th
- 2020 – 15th
- 2022 – Withdrawn
- 2024 – 15th
- 2026 – 15th

=== All-Africa Games ===
- 1987 – 5th
- 2011 – 10th
- 2015 – 10th
