= 1991 African Men's Handball Championship =

1991 African Men's Championship
Tournament details
- Host country: Egypt
- Venue: 1 (in 1 host city)
- Dates: 5–13 September 1991
- Teams: 7 (from 1 confederation)

Final positions
- Champions: Egypt (1st title)
- Runners-up: Algeria
- Third place: Tunisia
- Fourth place: Morocco

The 1991 African Men's Handball Championship was the ninth edition of the African Men's Handball Championship, held in Cairo, Egypt, from 5 to 13 September 1991. It acted as the African qualifying tournament for the 1992 Summer Olympics in Barcelona.

Egypt finished first in the round robin tournament and wins its first African title. Algeria finished second and Tunisia third.

== Qualified teams ==
- Algeria
- Congo
- Egypt (hosts)
- Ivory Coast
- Morocco
- Namibia (withdrew)
- Senegal
- Tunisia

== Format ==
8 teams qualified to the final tournament and was divided into two groups as below :

| Groups | Teams |
|---|---|
| Group A | Algeria, Congo, Tunisia, Morocco |
| Group B | Egypt, Namibia, Senegal, Ivory Coast |

However, because of the withdrawal of Namibia, it was decided to make a round robin tournament format of one final group regrouping the seven participated teams.

== Standings ==
| Pos | Team | Pld | W | D | L | GF | GA | GD | Pts | |
|---|---|---|---|---|---|---|---|---|---|---|
| 1 | Egypt | 6 | 6 | 0 | 0 | 123 | 61 | +62 | 12 | |
| 2 | Algeria | 6 | 5 | 0 | 1 | 129 | 90 | +39 | 10 | |
| 3 | Tunisia | 6 | 3 | 1 | 2 | 99 | 97 | +2 | 7 | |
| 4 | Morocco | 6 | 3 | 1 | 2 | 72 | 79 | −7 | 7 | |
| 5 | Ivory Coast | 6 | 1 | 0 | 5 | 100 | 127 | −27 | 2 | |
| 6 | Senegal | 6 | 1 | 0 | 5 | 51 | 73 | −22 | 2 | |
| 7 | Congo | 6 | 1 | 0 | 5 | 61 | 108 | −47 | 2 | |
| 8 | Namibia | 0 | 0 | 0 | 0 | 0 | 0 | 0 | 0 | Withdrawn |

Source: Todor66
Rules for classification: 1) points; 2) head-to-head points; 3) head-to-head goal difference; 4) head-to-head number of goals scored; 5) goal difference.

== Results ==
| 5 September 1991 | Egypt | 19–18 | Algeria | Cairo |

| 6 September 1991 | Tunisia | 22-17 | Ivory Coast | Cairo |

| 6 September 1991 | Morocco | 19–15 | Congo | Cairo |

| 7 September 1991 | Egypt | 21–12 | Ivory Coast | Cairo |

| 7 September 1991 | Algeria | 26–18 | Senegal | Cairo |
| 7 September 1991 | | (14–10) | | Cairo |

| 7 September 1991 | Tunisia | 27–16 | Congo | Cairo |

| 8 September 1991 | Egypt | 26–9 | Congo | Cairo |

| 8 September 1991 | Tunisia | 17–17 | Morocco | Cairo |

| 8 September 1991 | Ivory Coast | 22–21 | Senegal | Cairo |

| 10 September 1991 | Egypt | 21–12 | Morocco | Cairo |

| 10 September 1991 | Algeria | 14–11 | Ivory Coast | Cairo |

| 11 September 1991 | Algeria | 27–15 | Congo | Cairo |

| 11 September 1991 | Egypt | 20–10 | Tunisia | Cairo |

| 12 September 1991 | Tunisia | 27–21 | Ivory Coast | Cairo |
| 12 September 1991 | | (11–6) | | Cairo |

| 12 September 1991 | Algeria | 21–14 | Morocco | Cairo |
| 12 September 1991 | | (11–7) | | Cairo |

| 13 September 1991 | Congo | 21–14 | Ivory Coast | Cairo |
| 13 September 1991 | | (10–4) | | Cairo |

| 13 September 1991 | Algeria | 23–13 | Tunisia | Cairo |

| 13 September 1991 | Morocco | 23–20 | Ivory Coast | Cairo |

=== Tournament classification ===
| Team qualified for the 1992 Summer Olympics and the 1992 World Men's Handball Championship Group B |

| Rank | Team |
|---|---|
| Gold medal | Egypt |
| Silver medal | Algeria |
| Bronze medal | Tunisia |
| 4 | Morocco |
| 5 | Ivory Coast |
| 6 | Senegal |
| 7 | Congo |
