= Salle Bir Challouf =

Nabeul Indoor Complex
- Full name: Nabeul Bir Challouf Indoor Complex
- Location: Nabeul, Tunisia
- Capacity: 5,000

Construction
- Opened: 2004

Tenant
- Stade Nabeulien

The Nabeul Bir Challouf Indoor Sports Complex is an indoor sporting arena located in Nabeul, Tunisia, with a capacity of 5,000 spectators. It is the home of the Tunisian basketball club Stade Nabeulien.

== Events ==
The Nabeul Sports Complex was built specifically to host some of the 2005 FIBA Under-19 World Championship for Women matches and also hosted many 2005 World Men's Handball Championship matches. It has since become the home of the Stade Nabeulien Basketball team.

The complex is used for other sports, including volleyball, handball, wrestling, karate, judo and taekwondo and also hosts politics events and concerts.

== See also ==
- List of indoor arenas in Tunisia
