= Sherif Moemen =

Egyptian handball player

Sherif Moemen (born April 29, 1974) is an Egyptian former handball player. He competed for Egypt's national team at the 2000 and 2004
