= Radès =

Harbour city near Tunis, Tunisia

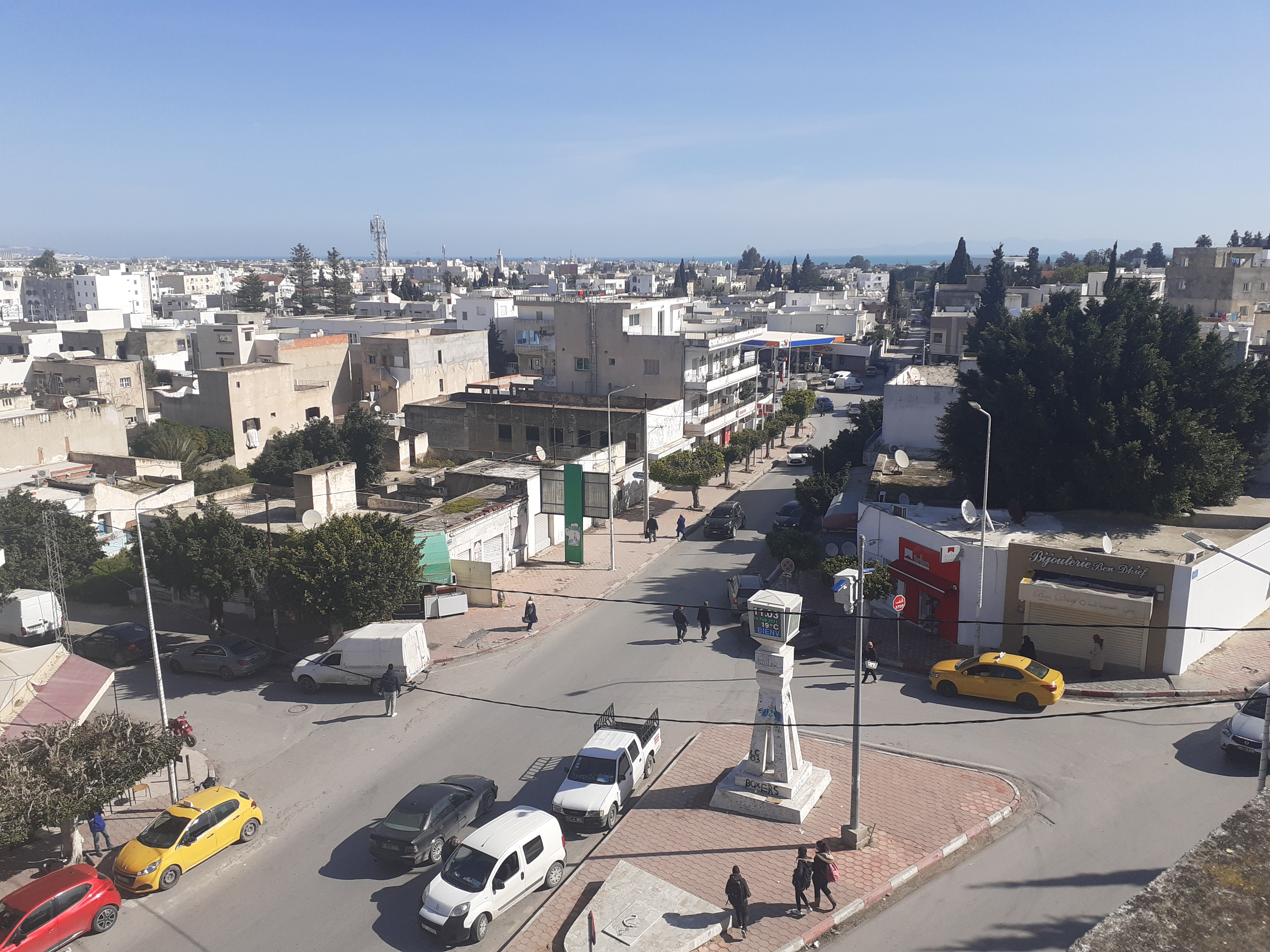
- Martyrs' Square, central Radès

- Coat of arms

- Location in Tunisia
- Coordinates: 36°46′N 10°17′E
- Country: Tunisia
- Governorate: Ben Arous Governorate
- Delegation(s): Radès

Government
  - Mayor: Jawher Sammari (Ennahda)
- Elevation: 160 ft (50 m)

Population (2022)
  - Total: 72,209
- Time zone: UTC1 (CET)
- Postal code: 2040

Radès (Arabic: رادس) is a harbour city in Ben Arous Governorate, Tunisia. Situated 9 km (5.6 mi) south-east of the capital Tunis, some consider it a Tunis suburb, and parts of the harbor installations of Tunis are located in Radès.

Rades is divided into sub cities: Radès Medina, Radès Méliane, Rades Forêt, Chouchet Radès, El Malleha, Noubou and The Olympic City, Rades Montjil, Rades echat. Way to Zahra district and el Oulija.

== History ==
Maxula Prates was a Civitas (town) of the Roman Province of Africa.

From the beginning of the Muslim conquest of the Maghreb, the hill of Rades was equipped with a ribat. It is around this ribat, which has long since disappeared, that the village of which it is spoken in the 11th century was built and which seems to have been provided with a port since that time. Under the Hafsides, vineyards spread over the hillsides.

During the reign of the Husseinite beys, Radès was inhabited by farmers and sought by the notables of Tunis city. The locality then grew rapidly and extended to the beach and the surrounding hills during the 19th century. High dignitaries built houses such as houses in a Hispano-Arabic style decorated with gardens such as those of governor Mokhtar Ben Zid and brigadier general Allala Ben Frija, who built a house there in 1862.

Between the end of the 19th and the beginning of the 20th century, members of the Djellouli family built themselves beautiful houses of Hispano-Arabic style, notably the ministers M'hammed Djellouli and Taïeb Djellouli, as well as the Governor Sadok Djellouli. French residents also built bourgeois villas in Europe. One can quote the colonial villa built in 1905 and bought by the Grand Vizier M'hamed Chenik, which gives it Hispano-Moorish and Italian styles; His brother Hassen, a notable landowner, lived in the villa Vacherot, which became his residence in the middle of the 20th century.

== Name ==
The modern name of the town, Radès, originally called Maxula Prates, derives from the Latin expression "Maxula per rates" (Maxula by the rafts), Maxula being the original Libyco-Berber name of the village near which is in the Antiquity a station of boats whose function is To connect the terminus of the coastal road with Carthage by sea. The Arabs have retained from this toponymic designation, which they have transformed into Rades.

== Bishopric ==
During the Roman Empire the town was also the seat of an ancient Christian bishopric which survives today as a titular see of the Roman Catholic Church.

== Sports ==
The Radès Sports City is one of the most modern sports cities in Africa, built to host the 2001 Mediterranean Games, At that time, it contained the Olympic Stadium, the athletics stadium and the Olympic swimming pool. The Olympic Stadium hosted the 2004 African Cup of Nations.

In January 2005, the Salle Omnisport de Radès was opened to host the 2005 World Men's Handball Championship, also hosted FIBA AfroBasket 2015 and 2017, and the African Men's Handball Championship 2006 and 2020.

ES Radès is the local team of the city.

== Tramway ==
The Maxula-Radès tramway to the sea was tram line that ran between Maxula-Radès station and the Mediterranean coast from 1902 and until the 1920s. The Beylical Decree of 7 July 1902 approved the agreement signed on 23 June of the same year between the Director of Public Works and Mr. Gaudens-Ravotti (industrial and public works contractor) for the construction and operation of a line of Tramway The track was built with a width of sixty centimeters and animal traction was used. The line ran along Boulevard Massicault and has a length of two kilometers.
