= Raed Bejaoui Indoor Sports Complex =

Sfax Indoor Complex
- Full name: Sfax Raed Bejaoui Indoor Sports Complex
- Location: Sfax, Tunisia
- Capacity: 5,000

The Sfax Indoor Sports Complex is an indoor sporting arena located in Sfax, Tunisia. The capacity of the arena is 4,000 spectators.

== Events ==
The Sports Indoor Complex is used for many Sports disciplines like Volleyball, Basketball, Handball and also the arena hold many politics and cultural Events.

== See also ==
- CS Sfaxien
