= Hammamet Indoor Sports Hall =

Indoor sporting arena in Hammamet, Tunisia

- Full name: Hammamet Indoor Sports Hall
- Location: Hammamet, Tunisia
- Capacity: 2,500

Construction
- Opened: April 04, 2008

The Hammamet Indoor Sports Hall is an indoor sporting arena located in Hammamet, Tunisia formerly known as The 7 November Hammamet Sports Hall but the name change later due to its symbolic link to the former Tunisia President Zine El Abidine Ben Ali. The hall is the home of Association Sportive d'Hammamet H.C. Handball team. The capacity of the arena is 2,500 spectators.

== Events ==
The Hammamet Sports Hall was built specifically to host some of the 2009 Men's Youth World Handball Championship matches and later it became the official home of Association Sportive d'Hammamet H.C. handball team and it follow with another basketball team section.

The Hammamet Indoor Sports Hall is used for many sports disciplines like volleyball, basketball and handball, and it is also a host for many politics and cultural events. However the hall has organised many African handball club competitions and also it is a host for Tunisia men's national handball team friendly matches.

== See also ==
- Association Sportive d'Hammamet H.C.
- 2009 Men's Youth World Handball Championship
- Tunisia men's national handball team
