= South Africa men's national handball team =

South Africa

Information
- Association: South African Handball Federation

Colours
1st	2nd

Results

African Championship
- Appearances: 1 (First in 1998)
- Best result: 10th (1998)
- Last updated on Unknown.

The South Africa national handball team is the national handball team of South Africa under the control of South African Handball Federation.

== African Championship record ==
- 1998 – 10th

== See also ==
- South Africa women's national handball team
