= 2021 World Men's Handball Championship squads =

This article displays the squads for the 2021 World Men's Handball Championship. Each team consists of up to 20 players.

Age, club, appearances and goals correct as of 13 January 2021.

== Group A ==
=== Cape Verde ===
A 23-player squad was announced on 22 December 2020.

Head coach: José Tomás

No.	Pos.	Name	Date of birth (age)	Height	App.	Goals	Club
1	GK	Luís Almeida	24 March 1994 (aged 26)	1.84 m	7	0	(Portugal) CDE Camões
2	CB	Gil Baiano dos Santos	18 March 1997 (aged 23)	1.88 m	0	0	(Cape Verde) Desportivo da Praia
3	LB	Délcio Pina	27 March 1992 (aged 28)	1.98 m	30	0	(Spain) CB Ciudad de Logroño
4	P	Ivo Santos	28 April 1992 (aged 28)	2.00 m	19	0	(Germany) Bergischer HC II
5	LB	Edmilson Araújo	6 January 1994 (aged 27)	1.87 m	0	0	(Romania) CS Minaur Baia Mare
6	LB	Leandro Semedo	24 December 1994 (aged 26)	1.94 m	31	0	(Spain) Ademar León
7	RW	Flávio Fortes	20 September 1992 (aged 28)	1.94 m	20	12	(France) Handball Club Cournon d'Auvergne
10	RB	Bruno Landim	6 April 1993 (aged 27)	1.93 m	15	0	(Portugal) Sporting Clube da Horta
11	LB	Fernando Dias	23 December 1992 (aged 28)	1.92 m	17	0	(Portugal) Boa-Hora
12	GK	Élcio Fernandes	23 September 1996 (aged 24)	1.96 m	12	0	(Spain) Balonmano Sinfín
13	P	Paulo Moreno	8 May 1992 (aged 28)	1.97 m	0	0	(Portugal) S.L. Benfica
15	LW	Alexandre Pereira	1 July 1994 (aged 26)	1.86 m	16	0	(Portugal) Boa-Hora FC
16	GK	Josimar Tavares	5 November 1986 (aged 34)	1.75 m	1	0	(Cape Verde) Desportivo da Praia
17	RB	Rafael Andrade	1 March 1996 (aged 24)	1.96 m	31	0	(Portugal) A.A. Avanca
18	GK	Júnior Soares	21 October 1995 (aged 25)	1.75 m	0	0	(Cape Verde) Atlético do Mindelo
19	RW	Admilson Furtado	30 September 1995 (aged 25)	1.77 m	12	7	(Portugal) Academico de Viseu
29	P	Felisberto Landim	3 November 1992 (aged 28)	1.97 m	13	0	(Portugal) C.F. Belenenses
30	CB	Elledy Semedo	21 March 1988 (aged 32)	1.87 m	6	0	(Portugal) Madeira Andebol SAD
44	CB	Gualther Furtado	6 February 1995 (aged 25)	1.85 m	21	0	(Portugal) A.A. Avanca
66	LB	Fred Wilson dos Santos	2 September 1996 (aged 24)	1.87 m	0	0	(Cape Verde) Atlético do Mindelo

=== Germany ===
A 20-player squad was announced on 21 December 2020. Moritz Preuss replaced Jannik Kohlbacher on 28 December 2020. On 11 January, Lukas Stutzke replaced Christian Dissinger. Tobias Reichmann was replaced by Patrick Groetzki on 16 January 2021.

Head coach: (Iceland) Alfreð Gíslason

No.	Pos.	Name	Date of birth (age)	Height	App.	Goals	Club
1	GK	Johannes Bitter	2 September 1982 (aged 38)	2.05 m	156	1	(Germany) TVB 1898 Stuttgart
3	LW	Uwe Gensheimer	26 October 1986 (aged 34)	1.88 m	188	919	(Germany) Rhein-Neckar Löwen
4	P	Johannes Golla	5 November 1997 (aged 23)	1.95 m	13	31	(Germany) SG Flensburg-Handewitt
9	RW	Tobias Reichmann	27 August 1988 (aged 32)	1.88 m	95	297	(Germany) MT Melsungen
12	GK	Silvio Heinevetter	21 October 1984 (aged 36)	1.94 m	195	3	(Germany) MT Melsungen
15	CB	Juri Knorr	9 May 2000 (aged 20)	1.90 m	3	5	(Germany) GWD Minden
18	P	Sebastian Firnhaber	18 April 1994 (aged 26)	1.98 m	2	4	(Germany) HC Erlangen
20	CB	Philipp Weber	15 September 1992 (aged 28)	1.94 m	33	85	(Germany) SC DHfK Leipzig
22	CB	Marian Michalczik	1 February 1997 (aged 23)	1.99 m	23	22	(Germany) Füchse Berlin
24	RW	Patrick Groetzki	4 July 1989 (aged 31)	1.89 m	145	368	(Germany) Rhein-Neckar Löwen
25	RB	Kai Häfner	10 July 1989 (aged 31)	1.92 m	94	206	(Germany) MT Melsungen
31	LW	Marcel Schiller	15 August 1991 (aged 29)	1.89 m	10	39	(Germany) Frisch Auf Göppingen
33	GK	Andreas Wolff	3 March 1991 (aged 29)	1.98 m	102	13	(Poland) Łomża Vive Kielce
35	LB	Julius Kühn	1 April 1993 (aged 27)	1.98 m	66	209	(Germany) MT Melsungen
38	LB	Fabian Böhm	24 June 1989 (aged 31)	1.98 m	43	70	(Germany) TSV Hannover-Burgdorf
39	LB	Lukas Stutzke	14 January 1998 (aged 22)	1.95 m	2	0	(Germany) Bergischer HC
42	P	Moritz Preuss	22 May 1995 (aged 25)	1.94 m	6	6	(Germany) SC Magdeburg
73	RW	Timo Kastening	25 June 1995 (aged 25)	1.80 m	15	45	(Germany) MT Melsungen
77	RB	David Schmidt	19 October 1993 (aged 27)	1.90 m	9	1	(Germany) Bergischer HC
95	CB	Paul Drux	7 February 1995 (aged 25)	1.92 m	91	171	(Germany) Füchse Berlin
96	RB	Antonio Metzner	27 June 1996 (aged 24)	2.07 m	1	5	(Germany) HC Erlangen

=== Hungary ===
A 21-player squad was announced on 21 December 2020. It was reduced to 19 later.

Head coach: István Gulyás

No.	Pos.	Name	Date of birth (age)	Height	App.	Goals	Club
2	P	Adrián Sipos	8 March 1990 (aged 30)	1.98 m	28	20	(Hungary) Grundfos Tatabánya
3	P	Petar Topic	30 December 1991 (aged 29)	2.01 m	0	0	(Hungary) Balatonfüredi KSE
7	LW	Bendegúz Bóka	2 October 1993 (aged 27)	1.93 m	35	82	(Hungary) Balatonfüredi KSE
9	RB	Zsolt Balogh	29 March 1989 (aged 31)	1.89 m	55	169	(Hungary) Grundfos Tatabánya
12	GK	Márton Székely	2 January 1990 (aged 31)	1.95 m	51	0	(Hungary) Telekom Veszprém
15	CB	Mátyás Győri	2 February 1997 (aged 23)	1.94 m	14	30	(Hungary) Grundfos Tatabánya
16	GK	Roland Mikler	20 September 1984 (aged 36)	1.93 m	207	0	(Hungary) MOL-Pick Szeged
17	LB	Bence Nagy	5 July 1995 (aged 25)	1.95 m	8	18	(Hungary) Ferencvárosi TC
20	P	Miklós Rosta	14 February 1999 (aged 21)	2.03 m	14	20	(Hungary) MOL-Pick Szeged
22	LW	Stefan Sunajko	10 April 1998 (aged 22)	1.94 m	0	0	(Hungary) Grundfos Tatabánya
23	RB	Dominik Máthé	1 April 1999 (aged 21)	2.01 m	20	35	(Norway) Elverum Håndball
24	GK	Ádám Borbély	22 June 1995 (aged 25)	1.97 m	15	0	(Hungary) Veszprémi KKFT
25	RW	Pedro Rodríguez Álvarez	22 August 1990 (aged 30)	1.97 m	0	0	(Hungary) Balatonfüredi KSE
27	P	Bence Bánhidi	9 February 1995 (aged 25)	2.06 m	72	195	(Hungary) MOL-Pick Szeged
30	LB	Zoltán Szita	10 February 1998 (aged 22)	1.96 m	21	48	(Poland) Orlen Wisła Płock
33	RB	Gábor Ancsin	27 November 1990 (aged 30)	2.02 m	113	226	(Hungary) Grundfos Tatabánya
39	LB	Richárd Bodó	13 March 1993 (aged 27)	2.03 m	65	191	(Hungary) MOL-Pick Szeged
47	RW	Péter Hornyák	4 October 1995 (aged 25)	1.77 m	45	69	(Hungary) Grundfos Tatabánya
66	CB	Máté Lékai	16 June 1988 (aged 32)	1.90 m	134	376	(Hungary) Telekom Veszprém
77	CB	Egon Hanusz	25 September 1997 (aged 23)	1.77 m	2	5	(Hungary) Csurgói KK

=== Uruguay ===
A 20-player squad was announced on 1 January 2021.

Head coach: Jorge Botejara

No.	Pos.	Name	Date of birth (age)	Height	App.	Goals	Club
1	GK	Felipe Navarrete	4 August 1999 (aged 21)	1.89 m	20	2	(Uruguay) Colegio Alemán
2	P	Gabriel Chaparro	20 February 1995 (aged 25)	1.93 m	45	15	(Spain) SD Atlético Novás
4	P	Facundo Listón	7 January 1993 (aged 28)	1.93 m	43	26	(Uruguay) Scuola Italiana di Montevideo
9	CB	Nicolás Fabra	5 January 1986 (aged 35)	1.86 m	96	504	(Uruguay) Scuola Italiana di Montevideo
10	LB	Gabriel Spangenberg	4 April 1986 (aged 34)	1.83 m	92	340	(Uruguay) Colegio Alemán
11	CB	Diego Falabrino	8 November 1993 (aged 27)	1.78 m	0	0	(Uruguay) Club Pontevedrés
13	CB	Máximo Cancio	24 February 1984 (aged 36)	1.90 m	20	93	(Spain) Balonmano Base Oviedo
15	P	Bruno Méndez	30 October 1994 (aged 26)	1.90 m	60	150	(Uruguay) Club Pontevedrés
16	GK	Felipe González	8 December 1993 (aged 27)	1.89 m	52	0	(Uruguay) Colegio Alemán
17	CB	Diego Morandeira	4 February 1993 (aged 27)	1.86 m	120	40	(Spain) iKasa BM Madrid
19	CB	Rodrigo Botejara	28 January 1993 (aged 27)	1.73 m	56	92	(Uruguay) Scuola Italiana di Montevideo
20	LW	Federico Rubbo	5 April 1989 (aged 31)	1.83 m	58	217	(Uruguay) Scuola Italiana di Montevideo
22	LB	Sebastián Vecino	18 March 1995 (aged 25)	1.95 m	30	30	(Uruguay) Colegio Alemán
24	LB	Alejandro Velazco	24 October 1993 (aged 27)	1.83 m	50	200	(Uruguay) Colegio Alemán
26	RW	Matías Echeverry	20 December 1999 (aged 21)	1.80 m	0	0	(Uruguay) Colegio Alemán
34	RW	Gerónimo Goyoaga	7 July 1996 (aged 24)	1.77 m	41	77	(Uruguay) Club Pontevedrés
36	LW	Cristian Rostagno	14 October 1995 (aged 25)	1.78 m	20	24	(Spain) Handbol Adrianenc
40	RB	Maximiliano De Agrela	19 October 1996 (aged 24)	1.83 m	20	35	(Uruguay) Club Malvín
74	RW	Guillermo Millan	7 July 1996 (aged 24)	1.74 m	15	20	(Uruguay) Scuola Italiana di Montevideo

== Group B ==
=== Brazil ===
A 20-player squad was announced on 30 December 2020. Matheus Francisco da Silva and Gabriel Ceretta were replaced by José Luciano and Guilherme Borges on 2 January 2021. César Almeida replaced Leonardo Terçariol on 11 January 2021. Thiagus dos Santos was removed from the squad on 12 January 2021. Guilherme Torriani replaced Felipe Borges on 14 January 2021.

Head coach: Leonardo Bortolini

No.	Pos.	Name	Date of birth (age)	Height	App.	Goals	Club
1	GK	Maik dos Santos	6 September 1980 (aged 40)	1.80 m	218	7	(Brazil) HC Taubaté
2	CB	Henrique Teixeira	27 February 1989 (aged 31)	1.92 m	120	186	(Romania) CSM București
4	CB	João Silva	29 January 1994 (aged 26)	1.90 m	52	95	(Spain) BM Puente Genil
5	LW	Guilherme Torriani	6 February 1999 (aged 21)	1.86 m	5	5	(Brazil) HC Taubaté
10	RB	José Toledo	11 January 1994 (aged 27)	1.93 m	82	216	(Romania) CS Minaur Baia Mare
11	LW	Cléber Andrade	14 June 1994 (aged 26)	1.85 m	100	100	(Brazil) HC Taubaté
13	P	Rogério Moraes Ferreira	11 January 1994 (aged 27)	2.04 m	32	65	(Hungary) Telekom Veszprém
16	GK	Rangel da Rosa	11 May 1996 (aged 24)	1.89 m	24	0	(Spain) CB Ciudad de Logroño
19	RW	Fábio Chiuffa	10 March 1989 (aged 31)	1.87 m	145	372	(Romania) HC Dobrogea Sud Constanța
25	P	Vinícius Teixeira	3 April 1988 (aged 32)	1.88 m	135	540	(Brazil) HC Taubaté
30	CB	Arthur Patrianova	22 April 1993 (aged 27)	1.91 m	40	89	(Spain) BM Atlético Valladolid
33	CB	Leonardo Dutra	29 March 1996 (aged 24)	1.84 m	19	52	(Poland) Orlen Wisła Płock
34	LB	José Luciano	19 February 2000 (aged 20)	1.98 m	0	0	(Portugal) S.L. Benfica
35	LB	Thiago Ponciano	8 May 1994 (aged 26)	1.93 m	27	20	(Spain) Ciudad Encantada
37	LB	Haniel Langaro	7 March 1995 (aged 25)	1.97 m	70	302	(Spain) FC Barcelona
77	RW	Rudolph Hackbarth	10 March 1994 (aged 26)	1.89 m	39	92	(Spain) CB Ciudad de Logroño
88	P	Guilherme Silva	5 February 1999 (aged 21)	1.93 m	0	0	(Brazil) HC Taubaté
89	GK	César Almeida	6 January 1989 (aged 32)	1.87 m	90	4	(France) Fenix Toulouse Handball
95	RB	Gustavo Rodrigues	9 April 1995 (aged 25)	1.90 m	35	74	(France) Pontault-Combault Handball

=== Poland ===
A 20-player squad was announced on 13 January 2021.

Head coach: Patryk Rombel

No.	Pos.	Name	Date of birth (age)	Height	App.	Goals	Club
1	GK	Mateusz Kornecki	5 June 1994 (aged 26)	1.94 m	40	3	(Poland) Łomża Vive Kielce
4	CB	Michał Olejniczak	31 January 2001 (aged 19)	1.95 m	19	19	(Poland) Łomża Vive Kielce
6	LW	Przemysław Krajewski	20 January 1987 (aged 33)	1.84 m	131	301	(Poland) Orlen Wisła Płock
7	P	Patryk Walczak	29 July 1992 (aged 28)	1.98 m	44	29	(North Macedonia) RK Vardar 1961
9	LB	Szymon Sićko	20 August 1997 (aged 23)	2.00 m	22	50	(Poland) Łomża Vive Kielce
11	RB	Maciej Majdziński	8 April 1996 (aged 24)	1.90 m	10	14	(Germany) Bergischer HC
14	CB	Arkadiusz Ossowski	4 November 1996 (aged 24)	1.93 m	5	4	(Poland) MMTS Kwidzyn
15	LB	Kacper Adamski	19 March 1992 (aged 28)	1.85 m	3	8	(Poland) Energa MKS Kalisz
16	GK	Piotr Wyszomirski	6 January 1988 (aged 33)	1.95 m	138	4	(Hungary) Grundfos Tatabánya
19	LW	Jan Czuwara	18 October 1995 (aged 25)	1.84 m	30	49	(Poland) Górnik Zabrze
20	CB	Maciej Pilitowski	27 October 1990 (aged 30)	1.88 m	25	29	(Poland) Energa MKS Kalisz
23	RW	Arkadiusz Moryto	31 August 1997 (aged 23)	1.82 m	59	255	(Poland) Łomża Vive Kielce
26	RW	Michał Daszek	27 June 1992 (aged 28)	1.82 m	106	265	(Poland) Orlen Wisła Płock
28	P	Maciej Gębala	10 January 1994 (aged 27)	2.00 m	58	49	(Germany) SC DHfK Leipzig
30	RB	Rafał Przybylski	19 February 1991 (aged 29)	2.00 m	72	145	(Poland) Azoty-Puławy
35	P	Mateusz Piechowski	1 March 1995 (aged 25)	2.10 m	6	0	(Spain) Ademar León
36	P	Dawid Dawydzik	17 December 1994 (aged 26)	2.00 m	20	34	(Poland) Azoty-Puławy
48	LB	Tomasz Gębala	23 November 1995 (aged 25)	2.12 m	32	114	(Poland) Łomża Vive Kielce
49	LB	Piotr Chrapkowski	24 March 1988 (aged 32)	2.03 m	116	170	(Germany) SC Magdeburg
94	GK	Adam Morawski	17 October 1994 (aged 26)	1.90 m	46	3	(Poland) Orlen Wisła Płock

=== Spain ===
An 18-player squad was announced on 9 January 2021.

Head coach: Jordi Ribera

No.	Pos.	Name	Date of birth (age)	Height	App.	Goals	Club
1	GK	Gonzalo Pérez de Vargas	10 January 1991 (aged 30)	1.89 m	113	10	(Spain) FC Barcelona
5	RB	Jorge Maqueda	6 February 1988 (aged 32)	1.97 m	139	353	(Hungary) Telekom Veszprém
6	LW	Ángel Fernández	16 September 1988 (aged 32)	1.93 m	60	180	(Poland) Łomża Vive Kielce
9	CB	Raúl Entrerríos	12 February 1981 (aged 39)	1.88 m	269	618	(Spain) FC Barcelona
10	RB	Alex Dujshebaev	17 December 1992 (aged 28)	1.88 m	99	264	(Poland) Łomża Vive Kielce
11	CB	Daniel Sarmiento	25 August 1983 (aged 37)	1.88 m	120	244	(France) Saint-Raphaël
12	GK	Rodrigo Corrales	24 January 1991 (aged 29)	2.00 m	72	3	(Hungary) Telekom Veszprém
13	P	Julen Aguinagalde	8 December 1982 (aged 38)	1.96 m	197	470	(Spain) CD Bidasoa
14	RW	Ferran Solé	25 August 1992 (aged 28)	1.93 m	50	213	(France) Paris Saint-Germain
15	LB	Iosu Goñi Leoz	4 January 1990 (aged 31)	1.92 m	61	89	(France) Chambéry Savoie Handball
17	P	Adrià Figueras	8 December 1988 (aged 32)	1.93 m	66	158	(France) HBC Nantes
21	LB	Joan Cañellas	30 September 1986 (aged 34)	1.98 m	188	478	(Hungary) MOL-Pick Szeged
24	LB	Viran Morros	15 December 1983 (aged 37)	1.99 m	228	166	(France) Paris Saint-Germain
28	RW	Aleix Gómez	7 May 1997 (aged 23)	1.84 m	35	118	(Spain) FC Barcelona
29	LW	Aitor Ariño	5 October 1992 (aged 28)	1.85 m	62	124	(Spain) FC Barcelona
30	P	Gedeón Guardiola	1 October 1984 (aged 36)	1.98 m	147	177	(Germany) TBV Lemgo
52	P	Rubén Marchán	20 September 1994 (aged 26)	2.04 m	0	0	(Spain) Ademar León
59	CB	Daniel Dujshebaev	4 July 1997 (aged 23)	1.97 m	41	68	(Poland) Łomża Vive Kielce
61	GK	Sergey Hernández	17 June 1995 (aged 25)	1.98 m	15	5	(Portugal) S.L. Benfica
62	RW	Kauldi Odriozola	7 January 1997 (aged 24)	1.83 m	13	45	(Spain) CD Bidasoa

=== Tunisia ===
A 21-player squad was announced on 3 January 2021. Achraf Margheli replaced Amine Bannour on 6 January 2021. It was cut to 20 on 10 January 2021.

Head coach: Sami Saïdi

No.	Pos.	Name	Date of birth (age)	Height	App.	Goals	Club
6	P	Ghazi Ben Ghali	28 March 1999 (aged 21)	1.98 m	2	0	(Tunisia) Étoile du Sahel
7	RW	Ramzi Majdoub	9 May 1993 (aged 27)	1.88 m	34	73	(Tunisia) Espérance de Tunis
8	LB	Rami Fekih	31 May 2000 (aged 20)	2.02 m	0	0	(Tunisia) AS Téboulba
12	GK	Marouen Maggaiz	28 July 1983 (aged 37)	1.92 m	203	2	(Tunisia) Club Africain
15	CB	Khaled Haj Youssef	12 January 1989 (aged 32)	1.89 m	107	62	(Qatar) Al Sadd SC
19	LB	Mosbah Sanaï	26 March 1991 (aged 29)	1.91 m	128	365	(Tunisia) Club Africain
22	LB	Youssef Maaref	21 July 1996 (aged 24)	1.95 m	26	18	(Tunisia) Espérance de Tunis
27	RW	Issam Rzig	14 September 1989 (aged 31)	1.82 m	17	45	(Tunisia) Étoile du Sahel
28	LB	Hazem Bacha	8 December 2001 (aged 19)	2.05 m	0	0	(Tunisia) Espérance de Tunis
39	CB	Mohamed Soussi	17 January 1993 (aged 27)	1.94 m	113	189	Tremblay-en-France
55	LW	Ghassen Toumi	14 June 1997 (aged 23)	1.80 m	0	0	(Tunisia) Club Sportif de Sakiet Ezzit
66	P	Islem Jbeli	13 December 1998 (aged 22)	1.93 m	0	0	(Tunisia) AS Hammamet
69	P	Jihed Jaballah	29 July 1989 (aged 31)	2.04 m	74	147	(Slovakia) HT Tatran Prešov
71	CB	Mohamed Darmoul	4 February 1998 (aged 22)	1.83 m	12	16	(Tunisia) Étoile du Sahel
77	LB	Skander Zaïdi	23 April 1997 (aged 23)	1.97 m	42	66	(Tunisia) Espérance de Tunis
88	GK	Marwen Soussi	21 June 1988 (aged 32)	1.94 m	13	0	(Tunisia) Club Sportif de Sakiet Ezzit
92	LB	Oussama Jaziri	6 November 1992 (aged 28)	1.91 m	42	74	(Egypt) Al Ahly
94	GK	Mehdi Harbaoui	11 September 1996 (aged 24)	1.96 m	0	0	(France) Sélestat Alsace Handball
96	RB	Anouar Ben Abdallah	20 June 1996 (aged 24)	1.86 m	31	39	(Slovakia) HT Tatran Prešov
97	RB	Achraf Margheli	22 May 1997 (aged 23)	1.93 m	0	0	(Saudi Arabia) Al-Khaleej

== Group C ==
=== Angola ===
A 21-player squad was announced on 27 December 2020.

Head coach: José Adelino

No.	Pos.	Name	Date of birth (age)	Height	App.	Goals	Club
2	P	Agnelo Quitongo	22 November 1991 (aged 29)	1.88 m	12	4	(Angola) Primeiro de Agosto
3	P	Jairoslav Aguia	11 June 1985 (aged 35)	1.90 m	12	8	(Angola) G.D. Interclube
4	P	Gabriel Teca	2 February 1991 (aged 29)	1.92 m	43	34	(Angola) Primeiro de Agosto
5	CB	Romé Hebo	11 April 1992 (aged 28)	1.92 m	69	107	(Romania) CS Dinamo București
7	CB	Cláudio Lopes	28 February 1992 (aged 28)	1.77 m	10	6	(Angola) G.D. Interclube
8	LW	Otiniel Pascoal	21 February 1995 (aged 25)	1.72 m	12	8	(Angola) Primeiro de Agosto
9	LW	Adilson Maneco	2 March 1993 (aged 27)	1.74 m	51	50	(Angola) Primeiro de Agosto
10	CB	Manuel Nascimento	15 March 1994 (aged 26)	1.83 m	11	15	(Angola) Primeiro de Agosto
11	RB	Feliciano Couveiro	22 December 1999 (aged 21)	1.92 m	2	0	(Angola) Primeiro de Agosto
12	GK	Ariel Silva	2 December 1998 (aged 22)	1.82 m	0	0	(Angola) G.D. Interclube
13	LB	Mário Tati	25 August 1988 (aged 32)	1.90 m	18	5	(Angola) G.D. Interclube
14	LW	Cláudio Chicola	25 September 1999 (aged 21)	1.90 m	10	4	(Angola) G.D. Interclube
15	LW	Mayomona Panzo	14 October 1994 (aged 26)	1.78 m	0	0	(Angola) G.D. Interclube
16	GK	Giovane Muachissengue	20 February 1984 (aged 36)	1.88 m	72	1	(Angola) Primeiro de Agosto
17	RB	Edgar Abreu	8 October 1992 (aged 28)	1.88 m	0	0	(Angola) G.D. Interclube
19	LW	Ruben José	1 July 2002 (aged 18)	1.87 m	0	0	(Angola) G.D. Interclube
20	GK	Custódio Gouveia	27 July 1985 (aged 35)	1.91 m	10	0	(Angola) G.D. Interclube
21	RB	Adelino Pestana	11 March 1992 (aged 28)	1.86 m	61	133	(Angola) G.D. Interclube
22	CB	Elias Antonio	30 May 1987 (aged 33)	1.77 m	12	6	(Portugal) Atlético Clube da Madeira
79	LB	Edvaldo Ferreira	28 May 1990 (aged 30)	2.00 m	39	143	(Angola) G.D. Interclube

=== Croatia ===
A 21-player squad was announced on 1 January 2021. The final 20-player squad was announced on 11 January 2021.

Head coach: Lino Červar

No.	Pos.	Name	Date of birth (age)	Height	App.	Goals	Club
3	P	Marino Marić	1 June 1990 (aged 30)	1.96 m	67	125	(Germany) MT Melsungen
5	CB	Domagoj Duvnjak	1 June 1988 (aged 32)	1.97 m	214	699	(Germany) THW Kiel
12	GK	Ivan Pešić	17 March 1989 (aged 31)	1.94 m	44	1	(Belarus) Meshkov Brest
13	RW	Zlatko Horvat	25 September 1984 (aged 36)	1.79 m	173	541	(North Macedonia) Metalurg Skopje
15	CB	Janko Kević	21 April 1986 (aged 34)	1.88 m	0	0	(Croatia) RK Nexe Našice
17	LB	Josip Šarac	24 February 1998 (aged 22)	2.01 m	13	6	(Slovenia) Celje Pivovarna Laško
18	CB	Igor Karačić	2 November 1988 (aged 32)	1.91 m	87	221	(Poland) Łomża Vive Kielce
26	LW	Manuel Štrlek	1 December 1988 (aged 32)	1.82 m	164	577	(Hungary) Telekom Veszprém
27	RW	Ivan Čupić	27 March 1986 (aged 34)	1.78 m	146	536	(North Macedonia) RK Vardar 1961
28	P	Željko Musa	8 January 1986 (aged 35)	2.00 m	133	112	(Germany) SC Magdeburg
30	LB	Marko Mamić	6 March 1994 (aged 26)	2.02 m	65	104	(Germany) SC DHfK Leipzig
31	RB	Luka Šebetić	26 May 1994 (aged 26)	1.98 m	25	11	Tremblay-en-France
33	CB	Luka Cindrić	5 July 1993 (aged 27)	1.83 m	71	173	(Spain) FC Barcelona
34	P	Ilija Brozović	26 May 1991 (aged 29)	1.96 m	42	50	(Germany) TSV Hannover-Burgdorf
35	GK	Mate Šunjić	18 March 1987 (aged 33)	1.90 m	18	0	(France) US Ivry Handball
39	LW	David Mandić	14 September 1997 (aged 23)	1.87 m	33	92	(Croatia) PPD Zagreb
45	LB	Halil Jaganjac	22 June 1998 (aged 22)	2.00 m	19	35	(Croatia) RK Nexe Našice
51	RB	Ivan Martinović	6 January 1998 (aged 23)	1.94 m	5	9	(Germany) TSV Hannover-Burgdorf
53	P	Marin Šipić	29 April 1996 (aged 24)	1.90 m	31	56	(Croatia) PPD Zagreb
55	GK	Marin Šego	2 August 1985 (aged 35)	1.98 m	51	2	(France) Montpellier Handball

=== Japan ===
A 20-player squad was announced on 2 January 2021.

Head coach: (Iceland) Dagur Sigurðsson

No.	Pos.	Name	Date of birth (age)	Height	App.	Goals	Club
10	LW	Naoki Sugioka	18 April 1994 (aged 26)	1.77 m	30	35	(Japan) Toyota Auto Body
12	GK	Yuta Iwashita	21 June 1991 (aged 29)	1.83 m	13	1	(Japan) Toyota Boshoku Kyushu
13	P	Kenya Kasahara	15 May 1988 (aged 32)	1.97 m	69	40	(Japan) Toyota Auto Body
14	CB	Asumi Kitazume	22 October 1996 (aged 24)	1.84 m	12	15	(Japan) Toyota Auto Body
15	LB	Adam Yuki Baig	12 April 1999 (aged 21)	1.94 m	41	72	(Japan) Zeekstar Tokyo
18	LB	Kohei Narita	15 June 1989 (aged 31)	1.99 m	85	126	(Japan) Wakunaga Pharmaceutical
19	RB	Shinnosuke Tokuda	6 December 1995 (aged 25)	1.78 m	56	220	(Japan) Toyoda Gosei
20	RB	Jin Watanabe	17 January 1990 (aged 30)	1.83 m	87	280	(Japan) Toyota Auto Body
21	LW	Remi Anri Doi	28 September 1989 (aged 31)	1.80 m	53	127	(Japan) Osaki Osol
22	GK	Motoki Sakai	10 November 1995 (aged 25)	1.92 m	19	2	(Japan) Toyoda Gosei
25	RW	Hiroki Motoki	14 February 1992 (aged 28)	1.82 m	79	208	(Japan) Osaki Osol
27	P	Hiroyasu Tamakawa	27 April 1995 (aged 25)	2.00 m	50	40	(Japan) Osaki Osol
31	LB	Tatsuki Yoshino	13 July 1994 (aged 26)	1.83 m	38	129	(Japan) Toyota Auto Body
33	CB	Yuto Agarie	6 July 1993 (aged 27)	1.83 m	62	210	(Japan) Daido Steel
36	RW	Naotsugu Demura	14 April 1988 (aged 32)	1.78 m	0	0	(Japan) Toyoda Gosei
38	CB	Kotaro Mizumachi	13 March 1995 (aged 25)	1.83 m	0	0	(Japan) Toyoda Gosei
39	GK	Takumi Nakamura	2 August 1996 (aged 24)	1.90 m	0	0	(Japan) Toyoda Gosei
40	P	Sota Takano	19 August 1998 (aged 22)	1.93 m	0	0	(Japan) Univ. of Tsukuba
41	RB	Rennosuke Tokuda	15 May 1998 (aged 22)	1.80 m	3	4	(Poland) Grupa Azoty Tarnów
43	P	Shuichi Yoshida	26 March 2001 (aged 19)	1.91 m	3	5	(Poland) Grupa Azoty Tarnów

=== Qatar ===
A 24-player squad was announced on 22 December 2020.

Head coach: (Spain) Valero Rivera López

No.	Pos.	Name	Date of birth (age)	Height	App.	Goals	Club
1	GK	Mohamed Soussi	22 July 1992 (aged 28)	1.84 m	7	0	(Qatar) Al-Khor
2	RB	Mustafa Alkrad	16 March 1987 (aged 33)	1.83 m	23	34	(Qatar) Al Arabi
4	P	Hassan Mabrouk	29 July 1982 (aged 38)	1.94 m	58	71	(Qatar) Al-Rayyan
9	LB	Rafael Capote	5 October 1987 (aged 33)	2.00 m	79	308	(Qatar) Al Duhail
10	LB	Frankis Carol	7 September 1987 (aged 33)	1.91 m	24	124	(Qatar) Al Arabi
12	GK	Danijel Šarić	27 June 1977 (aged 43)	1.91 m	69	0	(Qatar) Al Arabi
13	GK	Mohamed Abidi	5 October 1990 (aged 30)	1.90 m	24	0	Unattached
19	RW	Marwan Sassi	9 June 1995 (aged 25)	1.83 m	26	60	Unattached
20	P	Jovo Damjanović	24 December 1996 (aged 24)	1.99 m	37	101	(Qatar) Al-Rayyan
23	RW	Allaedine Berrached	31 January 1994 (aged 26)	1.86 m	57	131	(Qatar) Al Duhail
31	LW	Ahmad Madadi (c)	31 August 1994 (aged 26)	1.75 m	62	200	(Qatar) Al Duhail
32	LW	Ali Al-Deri	17 August 1989 (aged 31)	1.86 m	11	32	(Qatar) Al-Rayyan
33	CB	Houssem Romane	11 June 1987 (aged 33)	1.85 m	8	22	(Qatar) Al-Rayyan
37	P	Yassine Sami	1 May 1985 (aged 35)	1.91 m	25	23	(Qatar) Al-Wakrah
41	P	Youssef Benali	28 May 1987 (aged 33)	1.93 m	75	231	(Qatar) Al Arabi
44	RB	Amine Guehis	23 March 1996 (aged 24)	1.93 m	46	131	(Qatar) Al Duhail
66	RW	Omar Abdelfattah	8 June 1996 (aged 24)	1.78 m	55	97	(Qatar) Al Ahli
81	LW	Amor Dhiab	17 September 1996 (aged 24)	1.75 m	39	184	(Qatar) Al-Wakrah
86	CB	Mahmoud Hassaballa	22 November 1986 (aged 34)	1.91 m	90	105	(Qatar) Al Ahli
93	LW	Hamdi Ayed	16 August 1993 (aged 27)	1.88 m	37	102	(Qatar) Al Sadd
94	LB	Ameen Zakkar	15 June 1994 (aged 26)	1.98 m	65	93	(Saudi Arabia) Al Wehda

== Group D ==
=== Argentina ===
An 18-player squad was announced on 26 December 2020.

Head coach: (Spain) Manolo Cadenas

No.	Pos.	Name	Date of birth (age)	Height	App.	Goals	Club
2	LW	Federico Fernández	17 October 1989 (aged 31)	1.91 m	169	626	(Argentina) San Fernando HB
3	RB	Federico Pizarro	7 September 1986 (aged 34)	1.83 m	197	638	(Spain) BM Ciudad Encantada
4	CB	Sebastián Simonet	12 May 1986 (aged 34)	1.89 m	175	378	(Argentina) SAG Villa Ballester
5	RB	Pablo Vainstein	18 July 1989 (aged 31)	1.84 m	88	97	(Spain) BM Ciudad Encantada
6	CB	Diego Simonet	26 December 1989 (aged 31)	1.89 m	94	299	(France) Montpellier Handball
7	LW	Ignacio Pizarro	8 February 1990 (aged 30)	1.78 m	41	103	(Argentina) San Fernando HB
8	LB	Pablo Simonet	4 May 1992 (aged 28)	1.85 m	100	223	(Spain) BM Benidorm
9	RW	Santiago Baronetto	27 October 1992 (aged 28)	1.87 m	47	135	(Spain) BM Villa de Aranda
11	P	Lucas Moscariello	19 February 1992 (aged 28)	1.90 m	51	80	(Spain) BM Ciudad Encantada
15	P	Gonzalo Carou	15 August 1979 (aged 41)	1.90 m	256	542	(Spain) BM Puerto Sagunto
17	CB	Manuel Crivelli	18 October 1993 (aged 27)	1.78 m	24	42	(France) Cavigal Nice Handball
18	LB	Guillermo Fischer	18 July 1996 (aged 24)	2.00 m	32	34	(Spain) SCDR Anaitasuna
19	CB	Pedro Martínez Cami	20 December 1999 (aged 21)	1.90 m	0	0	(Spain) Ademar León
20	RW	Ramiro Martínez	22 July 1995 (aged 25)	1.80 m	10	37	(Spain) Balonmano Sinfín
22	P	Gastón Mouriño	12 October 1994 (aged 26)	1.92 m	26	33	(Spain) AD Ciudad de Guadalajara
33	GK	Agustín Forlino Coul	28 April 1997 (aged 23)	1.92 m	0	0	(Argentina) SEDALO
40	GK	Leonel Maciel	4 January 1989 (aged 32)	1.92 m	71	8	(Spain) BM Ciudad Encantada
71	LB	Santiago Cánepa	14 April 1991 (aged 29)	1.91 m	11	7	(Brazil) HC Taubaté
77	LB	Nicolás Bonanno	18 November 1991 (aged 29)	1.98 m	29	32	(Spain) CD Bidasoa
87	GK	Juan Bar	29 June 1987 (aged 33)	1.90 m	27	0	(Argentina) San Fernando HB

=== Bahrain ===
A 25-player squad was announced on 8 December 2020.

Head coach: (Iceland) Halldór Jóhann Sigfússon

No.	Pos.	Name	Date of birth (age)	Height	App.	Goals	Club
1	GK	Husain Mahfoodh	29 June 2001 (aged 19)	1.86 m	45	5	(Bahrain) Al-Ahli
3	CB	Ali Abdulla Eid	18 January 1991 (aged 29)	1.75 m	55	120	(Bahrain) Al-Najma
7	RB	Ali Merza	7 July 1988 (aged 32)	1.84 m	150	419	(Bahrain) Al-Najma
9	LW	Hasan Al-Samahiji	22 February 1991 (aged 29)	1.77 m	65	250	(Bahrain) Al-Ahli
11	LB	Abdullah Ali	1 August 1999 (aged 21)	1.70 m	55	160	(Bahrain) Al Ittihad
14	RW	Qasim Qambar	21 August 2001 (aged 19)	1.75 m	30	75	(Bahrain) Barbar
15	LB	Mohamed Abdulredha	27 September 1989 (aged 31)	1.86 m	55	90	(Bahrain) Al-Ahli
18	RW	Ahmed Jalal	31 January 1998 (aged 22)	1.68 m	65	120	(Bahrain) Al-Shabab
19	P	Mohamed Merza	17 April 1987 (aged 33)	1.84 m	80	148	(Bahrain) Al-Najma
21	GK	Mohamed Abdulhusain	12 August 1989 (aged 31)	1.75 m	250	15	(Bahrain) Al-Najma
25	GK	Qasim Al-Shwaikh	17 July 1998 (aged 22)	1.65 m	65	5	(Bahrain) Barbar
50	CB	Ahmed Al-Maqabi	26 October 1994 (aged 26)	1.75 m	71	95	(Bahrain) Barbar
66	LB	Komail Mahfoodh	28 April 1992 (aged 28)	1.89 m	65	120	(Bahrain) Al-Najma
77	LB	Jasim Al-Salatna	23 March 1989 (aged 31)	1.85 m	150	210	(Bahrain) Al-Ahli
78	LB	Ali Abdulqader	5 July 1993 (aged 27)	1.75 m	150	320	(Bahrain) Barbar
88	P	Hasan Al-Fardan	10 December 1988 (aged 32)	1.65 m	90	168	(Bahrain) Al-Najma
89	LW	Mahdi Saad	15 March 1989 (aged 31)	1.73 m	120	250	(Bahrain) Al-Najma
93	LB	Mohamed Habib	20 July 1993 (aged 27)	1.86 m	180	150	(Saudi Arabia) Al-Wehda Club
98	CB	Mohamed Mohamed	2 July 2001 (aged 19)	1.78 m	60	155	(Bahrain) Al-Najma
99	CB	Husain Al-Sayyad (c)	14 January 1988 (aged 32)	1.75 m	450	950	(Bahrain) Al-Najma

=== Denmark ===
A 20-player squad was announced on 17 December 2020. On 6 January Henrik Toft Hansen was replaced by Benjamin Jakobsen.

Head coach: Nikolaj Jacobsen

No.	Pos.	Name	Date of birth (age)	Height	App.	Goals	Club
1	GK	Niklas Landin Jacobsen	19 December 1988 (aged 32)	2.01 m	211	9	(Germany) THW Kiel
4	LW	Magnus Landin Jacobsen	20 August 1995 (aged 25)	1.97 m	62	130	(Germany) THW Kiel
5	LW	Magnus Bramming	1 October 1990 (aged 30)	1.82 m	13	30	(Denmark) TTH Holstebro
7	LW	Emil Jakobsen	24 January 1998 (aged 22)	1.90 m	4	10	(Denmark) GOG Håndbold
12	GK	Emil Nielsen	10 March 1997 (aged 23)	1.95 m	5	0	(France) HBC Nantes
14	P	Anders Zachariassen	4 September 1991 (aged 29)	1.92 m	48	109	(Denmark) GOG Håndbold
15	P	Magnus Saugstrup	12 July 1996 (aged 24)	1.95 m	15	20	(Denmark) Aalborg Håndbold
17	RW	Lasse Svan Hansen	31 August 1983 (aged 37)	1.85 m	216	507	(Germany) SG Flensburg-Handewitt
20	GK	Kevin Møller	20 June 1989 (aged 31)	2.03 m	25	3	(Spain) FC Barcelona
21	LB	Henrik Møllgaard	2 January 1985 (aged 36)	1.97 m	157	173	(Denmark) Aalborg Håndbold
22	CB	Mads Mensah Larsen	12 August 1991 (aged 29)	1.88 m	133	245	(Germany) SG Flensburg-Handewitt
24	LB	Mikkel Hansen	22 October 1987 (aged 33)	1.92 m	210	1036	(France) Paris Saint-Germain
25	CB	Morten Olsen	11 October 1984 (aged 36)	1.84 m	97	202	(Denmark) GOG Håndbold
26	RW	Jóhan Hansen	1 May 1994 (aged 26)	1.90 m	32	67	(Germany) TSV Hannover-Burgdorf
28	LB	Lasse Andersson	11 March 1994 (aged 26)	1.90 m	28	32	(Germany) Füchse Berlin
31	RB	Nikolaj Øris Nielsen	26 September 1986 (aged 34)	1.94 m	44	79	(Denmark) Bjerringbro-Silkeborg
32	CB	Jacob Holm	5 September 1995 (aged 25)	1.94 m	25	56	(Germany) Füchse Berlin
33	RB	Mathias Gidsel	8 February 1999 (aged 21)	1.90 m	1	3	(Denmark) GOG Håndbold
34	P	Simon Hald	29 September 1994 (aged 26)	2.03 m	29	29	(Germany) SG Flensburg-Handewitt
35	LB	Nikolaj Læsø	15 November 1996 (aged 24)	1.96 m	0	0	(Denmark) Aalborg Håndbold
36	P	Benjamin Jakobsen	9 September 1991 (aged 29)	1.91 m	3	1	(Denmark) Aalborg Håndbold

=== DR Congo ===
A 20-player squad was announced on 6 January 2021.

Head coach: Francis Tuzolana

No.	Pos.	Name	Date of birth (age)	Height	App.	Goals	Club
1	GK	Berlin Sobtacdoug	27 January 1977 (aged 43)	1.85 m	45	0	(Democratic Republic of the Congo) JS Kinshasa
2	LW	Mara Mukuna	6 October 1993 (aged 27)	1.79 m	1	1	(Democratic Republic of the Congo) Heritage Handball
4	P	Christian Yahoza	25 May 1998 (aged 22)	1.90 m	1	1	(Angola) Primeiro de Agosto
8	LB	Daniel Mathey	12 September 1993 (aged 27)	1.82 m	1	1	(France) Bruges Lormont Handball
9	RB	Zephyrin Bouity	11 December 1999 (aged 21)	1.87 m	6	1	(France) Massy Essonne Handball
10	LB	Andre Ngoulou	12 February 1994 (aged 26)	1.89 m	1	1	(France) AC Boulogne-Billancourt
11	RB	Adam Ngando	20 March 1986 (aged 34)	1.91 m	1	1	(France) Saint-Étienne
12	GK	Junior Lucau	7 April 1987 (aged 33)	1.89 m	1	0	(Sweden) Skånela IF
14	CB	Fabrice Ebanga	8 May 1990 (aged 30)	1.80 m	9	1	(Democratic Republic of the Congo) JS Kinshasa
15	P	Gauthier Mvumbi	15 May 1994 (aged 26)	1.92 m	1	1	(France) Dreux AC
16	GK	Jordy Jacoby	8 February 1995 (aged 25)	1.90 m	9	1	(France) Caen HB
17	LW	Johan Kiangebeni	28 August 1995 (aged 25)	1.80 m	17	1	(France) CO Vernouillet
18	RW	Baudric Eyanga	1 April 1992 (aged 28)	1.83 m	24	1	(Democratic Republic of the Congo) JS Kinshasa
22	LB	Frédéric Beauregard	28 January 1984 (aged 36)	1.90 m	6	1	(France) JS Cherbourg Manche Handball
27	LW	Olivier Botetsi	8 May 1990 (aged 30)	1.87 m	71	1	(France) AS Saint-Ouen-l'Aumône Handball
55	P	Daniel Morisho	7 February 1996 (aged 24)	1.52 m	1	1	(Democratic Republic of the Congo) JS Kinshasa
68	LW	Aurélien Tchitombi	3 August 1993 (aged 27)	1.87 m	17	0	(France) Grand Nancy Métropole HB
75	RW	Steeven Corneil	29 December 1995 (aged 25)	1.78 m	1	1	(France) Angers SCO Handball
83	LW	Jacques Kinzonzolo	8 July 1993 (aged 27)	1.78 m	9	1	(France) Savigny Handball 91
84	CB	Audräy Tuzolana	28 February 1984 (aged 36)	1.86 m	1	1	(France) Dreux AC

== Group E ==
=== Austria ===
A 20-player squad was announced on 1 January 2021.

Head coach: (Slovenia) Aleš Pajovič

No.	Pos.	Name	Date of birth (age)	Height	App.	Goals	Club
1	GK	Thomas Bauer	24 January 1986 (aged 34)	1.90 m	159	0	(Greece) AEK
4	RB	Maximilian Hermann	10 December 1991 (aged 29)	1.95 m	53	103	(Austria) HC Linz AG
6	LB	Dominik Schmid	7 September 1989 (aged 31)	1.92 m	57	74	(Austria) Alpla HC Hard
8	RW	Robert Weber	25 November 1985 (aged 35)	1.79 m	183	801	(Germany) HSG Nordhorn-Lingen
16	GK	Florian Kaiper	26 May 1995 (aged 25)	1.87 m	3	0	(Austria) SG Handball West Wien
19	P	Antonio Juric	24 November 1997 (aged 23)	1.99 m	0	0	(Germany) TSV Bayer Dormagen
20	LW	Sebastian Frimmel	18 December 1995 (aged 25)	1.90 m	62	153	(Switzerland) Kadetten Schaffhausen
24	LB	Daniel Dicker	5 June 1995 (aged 25)	1.99 m	19	15	(Germany) ThSV Eisenach
26	P	Lukas Herburger	19 December 1994 (aged 26)	1.97 m	34	20	(Switzerland) Kadetten Schaffhausen
28	CB	Gerald Zeiner	28 June 1988 (aged 32)	1.90 m	54	113	(Austria) Handball Tirol
30	RB	Boris Zivkovic	2 May 1992 (aged 28)	1.95 m	32	31	(Austria) Alpla HC Hard
31	LW	Julian Pratschner	29 December 1996 (aged 24)	1.90 m	11	18	(Austria) SG Handball West Wien
40	GK	Thomas Eichberger	20 August 1993 (aged 27)	1.94 m	12	0	(Germany) ThSV Eisenach
41	RW	Julian Ranftl	17 February 1996 (aged 24)	1.84 m	17	21	(Austria) SG Handball West Wien
55	P	Tobias Wagner	26 March 1995 (aged 25)	1.98 m	56	96	(Austria) Fivers Margareten
57	P	Balthasar Huber	23 July 1993 (aged 27)	1.92 m	0	0	(Austria) Handball Tirol
60	CB	Jakob Jochmann	2 October 1993 (aged 27)	1.78 m	15	15	(Austria) UHK Krems
72	LB	Lukas Hutecek	2 July 2000 (aged 20)	1.88 m	9	9	(Austria) Fivers Margareten
77	RB	Nikola Stevanovic	17 April 1998 (aged 22)	1.93 m	1	2	(Austria) Fivers Margareten
94	LB	Christoph Neuhold	27 April 1994 (aged 26)	1.93 m	36	18	(Germany) HSC 2000 Coburg

=== France ===
A 20-player squad was revealed on 30 December 2020.

Head coach: Guillaume Gille

No.	Pos.	Name	Date of birth (age)	Height	App.	Goals	Club
2	RW	Yanis Lenne	29 June 1996 (aged 24)	1.88 m	16	17	(France) Montpellier Handball
5	RB	Nedim Remili	18 July 1995 (aged 25)	1.95 m	69	216	(France) Paris Saint-Germain
7	CB	Romain Lagarde	5 March 1997 (aged 23)	1.94 m	39	52	(Germany) Rhein-Neckar Löwen
9	CB	Melvyn Richardson	30 January 1997 (aged 23)	1.90 m	22	47	(France) Montpellier Handball
10	RB	Dika Mem	31 August 1997 (aged 23)	1.94 m	52	133	(Spain) FC Barcelona
11	P	Nicolas Tournat	5 April 1994 (aged 26)	2.00 m	31	29	(Poland) Łomża Vive Kielce
12	GK	Vincent Gérard	16 December 1986 (aged 34)	1.89 m	97	14	(France) Paris Saint-Germain
14	CB	Kentin Mahé	22 May 1991 (aged 29)	1.86 m	107	354	(Hungary) Telekom Veszprém
16	GK	Yann Genty	26 December 1981 (aged 39)	1.85 m	6	0	(France) Paris Saint-Germain
17	LB	Timothey N'Guessan	18 September 1992 (aged 28)	1.96 m	78	145	(Spain) FC Barcelona
19	RW	Luc Abalo	6 September 1984 (aged 36)	1.83 m	262	805	(Norway) Elverum Håndball
21	LW	Michaël Guigou	28 January 1982 (aged 38)	1.80 m	283	970	(France) USAM Nîmes Gard
22	P	Luka Karabatić	19 April 1988 (aged 32)	2.02 m	103	120	(France) Paris Saint-Germain
23	P	Ludovic Fabregas	1 July 1996 (aged 24)	1.98 m	72	131	(Spain) FC Barcelona
24	GK	Wesley Pardin	1 January 1990 (aged 31)	1.95 m	17	0	(France) Pays d’Aix UC
25	LW	Hugo Descat	16 August 1992 (aged 28)	1.83 m	2	0	(France) Montpellier Handball
26	CB	Nicolas Claire	10 July 1987 (aged 33)	1.90 m	45	45	(France) Pays d’Aix UC
27	RB	Adrien Dipanda	3 May 1988 (aged 32)	2.02 m	77	91	(France) Saint-Raphaël Var Handball
28	RW	Valentin Porte	7 September 1990 (aged 30)	1.90 m	108	313	(France) Montpellier Handball
37	LB	Jean-Jacques Acquevillo	17 January 1989 (aged 31)	1.95 m	2	7	(France) USAM Nîmes Gard
92	GK	Remi Desbonnet	28 February 1992 (aged 28)	1.82 m	0	0	(France) USAM Nîmes Gard

=== Norway ===
A 21-player squad was announced on 15 December 2020. On 21 December, Eivind Tangen replaced Magnus Abelvik Rød in the squad. Later, Robin Paulsen Haug was cut from the squad.

Head coach: Christian Berge

No.	Pos.	Name	Date of birth (age)	Height	App.	Goals	Club
5	CB	Sander Sagosen	14 September 1995 (aged 25)	1.95 m	108	521	(Germany) THW Kiel
7	CB	Sander Øverjordet	8 April 1996 (aged 24)	1.97 m	15	10	(Denmark) Mors-Thy Håndbold
8	P	Bjarte Myrhol	29 May 1982 (aged 38)	1.92 m	244	766	(Denmark) Skjern Håndbold
9	P	Henrik Jakobsen	16 December 1992 (aged 28)	1.96 m	44	40	(France) Fenix Toulouse Handball
11	P	Petter Øverby	26 March 1992 (aged 28)	1.94 m	72	45	(Germany) HC Erlangen
12	GK	Kristian Sæverås	22 June 1996 (aged 24)	1.97 m	17	1	(Germany) SC DHfK Leipzig
15	RB	Kent Robin Tønnesen	5 June 1991 (aged 29)	1.95 m	102	275	(Hungary) Telekom Veszprém
16	GK	Espen Christensen	17 June 1985 (aged 35)	1.90 m	111	2	(Sweden) IFK Kristianstad
17	LW	Magnus Jøndal	7 February 1988 (aged 32)	1.81 m	158	504	(Germany) SG Flensburg-Handewitt
18	LB	William Aar	23 October 1997 (aged 23)	1.95 m	12	9	(Denmark) Aarhus Håndbold
19	RW	Kristian Bjørnsen	10 January 1989 (aged 32)	1.92 m	128	525	(Germany) HSG Wetzlar
23	LB	Gøran Johannessen	26 April 1994 (aged 26)	1.93 m	72	154	(Germany) SG Flensburg-Handewitt
24	CB	Christian O'Sullivan	22 August 1991 (aged 29)	1.90 m	125	194	(Germany) SC Magdeburg
25	RB	Eivind Tangen	4 May 1993 (aged 27)	1.95 m	94	154	(Denmark) Skjern Håndbold
26	LB	Simen Holand Pettersen	8 April 1998 (aged 22)	1.92 m	4	1	(Norway) Elverum Håndball
27	RB	Harald Reinkind	17 August 1992 (aged 28)	1.96 m	109	213	(Germany) THW Kiel
30	GK	Torbjørn Bergerud	16 July 1994 (aged 26)	2.00 m	87	0	(Germany) SG Flensburg-Handewitt
32	P	Thomas Solstad	26 February 1997 (aged 23)	1.90 m	2	0	(Norway) Elverum Håndball
44	RW	Kevin Gulliksen	9 November 1996 (aged 24)	1.85 m	37	49	(Germany) GWD Minden
71	LW	Alexander Blonz	17 April 2000 (aged 20)	1.83 m	30	47	(Norway) Elverum Håndball

=== Switzerland ===
The squad was announced on 13 January 2021.

Head coach: Michael Suter

No.	Pos.	Name	Date of birth (age)	Height	App.	Goals	Club
2	CB	Andy Schmid	30 August 1983 (aged 37)	1.89 m	184	891	(Germany) Rhein-Neckar Löwen
4	LB	Lenny Rubin	1 February 1996 (aged 24)	2.05 m	40	133	(Germany) HSG Wetzlar
6	RW	Cédrie Tynowski	21 September 1996 (aged 24)	1.87 m	24	52	(Switzerland) Pfadi Winterthur
8	P	Michal Svajlen	12 April 1989 (aged 31)	1.96 m	89	104	(Switzerland) Pfadi Winterthur
9	LW	Marvin Lier	8 September 1992 (aged 28)	1.85 m	67	161	(Switzerland) Pfadi Winterthur
11	LB	Roman Sidorowicz	8 August 1991 (aged 29)	1.87 m	65	147	(Switzerland) Pfadi Winterthur
12	GK	Leonard Grazioli	19 January 2001 (aged 19)	1.93 m	3	0	(Switzerland) HSC Suhr Aarau
15	RB	Nicolas Raemy	25 February 1992 (aged 28)	1.86 m	66	192	(Switzerland) Wacker Thun
16	GK	Nikola Portner	19 November 1993 (aged 27)	1.94 m	93	10	(France) Chambéry Handball
17	P	Samuel Röthlisberger	15 August 1996 (aged 24)	1.99 m	49	13	(Germany) TVB 1898 Stuttgart
20	LB	Luka Maros	20 March 1994 (aged 26)	1.96 m	51	117	(Switzerland) Kadetten Schaffhausen
22	CB	Jonas Schelker	9 April 1999 (aged 21)	1.82 m	13	18	(Switzerland) Kadetten Schaffhausen
24	RB	Nik Tominec	26 March 1991 (aged 29)	1.87 m	17	15	(Switzerland) Kadetten Schaffhausen
27	RW	Maximilian Gerbl	25 June 1995 (aged 25)	1.79 m	37	71	(Switzerland) Kadetten Schaffhausen
29	LW	Samuel Zehnder	29 February 2000 (aged 20)	1.84 m	15	34	(Switzerland) Kadetten Schaffhausen
31	GK	Aurel Bringolf	2 November 1987 (aged 33)	1.90 m	72	2	(Switzerland) TSV St. Otmar St. Gallen
34	P	Alen Milosevic	24 December 1989 (aged 31)	1.91 m	50	90	(Germany) SC DHfK Leipzig
36	P	Philip Novak	11 April 1999 (aged 21)	1.98 m	13	1	(Switzerland) Kadetten Schaffhausen
44	CB	Mehdi Ben Romdhane	2 December 2001 (aged 19)	1.89 m	0	0	(Switzerland) Kadetten Schaffhausen

== Group F ==
=== Algeria ===
A 21-player squad was announced on 2 December 2020. It was reduced to 20 on 11 January 2021.

Head coach: (France) Alain Portes

No.	Pos.	Name	Date of birth (age)	Height	App.	Goals	Club
2	LB	Zoheïr Naïm	3 May 1996 (aged 24)	1.88 m	12	18	(Algeria) JSES Skikda
4	LB	Noureddine Hellal	23 May 1996 (aged 24)	1.86 m	10	15	(Qatar) Al Ahli
6	LB	Messaoud Berkous	20 July 1989 (aged 31)	1.92 m	165	697	(Algeria) GS Pétroliers
7	LB	Hichem Daoud	9 January 1992 (aged 29)	1.89 m	98	150	(France) Istres PH
8	P	Aaladine Hadidi	18 May 1991 (aged 29)	1.90 m	12	20	(Algeria) GS Pétroliers
12	GK	Abdellah Benmenni	19 August 1986 (aged 34)	1.89 m	30	0	(Algeria) GS Pétroliers
13	LW	Riadh Chahbour	28 July 1985 (aged 35)	1.84 m	155	360	(Algeria) GS Pétroliers
15	RW	Redouane Saker	1 October 1991 (aged 29)	1.78 m	25	32	(Algeria) JSES Skikda
16	GK	Yahia Zemouchi	17 September 1994 (aged 26)	1.93 m	2	0	(Algeria) OM Annaba
18	P	Hichem Kaabeche	12 March 1990 (aged 30)	1.92 m	85	150	(Qatar) Al Ahli
19	P	Okba Ensaad	12 March 1993 (aged 27)	1.88 m	6	3	(Algeria) CR Bordj Bou Arréridj
21	LW	Oussem Boudjenah	25 June 1991 (aged 29)	1.85 m	6	9	(Algeria) JSES Skikda
22	GK	Khalifa Ghedbane	26 November 1996 (aged 24)	1.98 m	34	2	(Spain) Ademar León
23	RB	Abderrahim Berriah	19 January 1988 (aged 32)	1.90 m	120	280	(Algeria) GS Pétroliers
25	P	Sofiane Bendjilali	28 March 1995 (aged 25)	1.90 m	0	0	(Tunisia) Club Africain
26	LB	Mokhtar Kouri	29 February 1996 (aged 24)	1.94 m	8	20	(Algeria) MC Saïda
36	CB	Rahim Abdelkader	12 July 1990 (aged 30)	1.85 m	95	206	(France) Dunkerque HGL
44	CB	Mustapha Hadj Sadok	17 August 1997 (aged 23)	1.87 m	30	42	(Qatar) Al-Wakrah
77	LW	Réda Arib	22 October 1991 (aged 29)	1.86 m	8	20	(Algeria) GS Pétroliers
87	RB	Ayoub Abdi	6 February 1997 (aged 23)	1.89 m	35	67	(France) Fenix Toulouse HB

=== Iceland ===
A 20-player squad was announced on 4 January 2021.

Head coach: Guðmundur Guðmundsson

No.	Pos.	Name	Date of birth (age)	Height	App.	Goals	Club
1	GK	Björgvin Páll Gústavsson	24 May 1985 (aged 35)	1.93 m	230	13	(Iceland) Haukar Handball
3	P	Kári Kristjánsson	28 October 1984 (aged 36)	1.94 m	145	178	(Iceland) ÍBV
7	RB	Viggó Kristjánsson	9 December 1993 (aged 27)	1.89 m	11	21	(Germany) TVB 1898 Stuttgart
8	LW	Bjarki Már Elísson	16 May 1990 (aged 30)	1.91 m	71	165	(Germany) TBV Lemgo
9	CB	Elvar Örn Jónsson	31 August 1997 (aged 23)	1.89 m	35	92	(Denmark) Skjern Håndbold
11	P	Ýmir Örn Gíslason	1 July 1997 (aged 23)	1.95 m	42	20	(Germany) Rhein-Neckar Löwen
13	LB	Ólafur Guðmundsson	13 May 1990 (aged 30)	1.94 m	123	230	(Sweden) IFK Kristianstad
14	RB	Ómar Ingi Magnússon	12 March 1997 (aged 23)	1.86 m	47	129	(Germany) SC Magdeburg
15	RB	Alexander Petersson	2 July 1980 (aged 40)	1.86 m	181	719	(Germany) Rhein-Neckar Löwen
16	GK	Viktor Gísli Hallgrímsson	24 July 2000 (aged 20)	2.03 m	18	0	(Denmark) GOG Håndbold
17	RW	Arnór Þór Gunnarsson	23 October 1987 (aged 33)	1.78 m	114	332	(Germany) Bergischer HC
18	CB	Gísli Þorgeir Kristjánsson	30 July 1999 (aged 21)	1.91 m	24	32	(Germany) SC Magdeburg
20	GK	Ágúst Elí Björgvinsson	11 April 1995 (aged 25)	1.90 m	31	0	(Denmark) KIF Kolding
21	P	Arnar Freyr Arnarsson	14 March 1996 (aged 24)	2.00 m	52	69	(Germany) MT Melsungen
22	RW	Sigvaldi Guðjónsson	4 July 1994 (aged 26)	1.92 m	28	54	(Poland) Łomża Vive Kielce
23	LW	Oddur Grétarsson	20 July 1990 (aged 30)	1.82 m	18	31	(Germany) HBW Balingen-Weilstetten
24	LB	Magnús Óli Magnússon	8 May 1992 (aged 28)	1.86 m	6	6	(Iceland) Valur
26	RB	Kristján Örn Kristjánsson	25 December 1997 (aged 23)	1.92 m	7	13	(France) Pays d'Aix Université Club
29	P	Elliði Snær Viðarsson	15 November 1998 (aged 22)	1.91 m	6	4	(Germany) VfL Gummersbach
33	CB	Janus Daði Smárason	1 January 1995 (aged 26)	1.86 m	46	66	(Germany) Frisch Auf Göppingen

=== Morocco ===
A 23-player squad was announced on 7 January 2021.

Head coach: Noureddine Bouhaddioui

No.	Pos.	Name	Date of birth (age)	Height	App.	Goals	Club
1	GK	Yassine Idrissi	13 January 1984 (aged 37)	1.93 m	45	16	(France) Limoges Hand 87
7	RW	Rezzouki Reida	7 August 1997 (aged 23)	1.84 m	25	60	Tremblay-en-France Handball
8	CB	Mohamed Bentaleb	1 January 1992 (aged 29)	1.90 m	45	90	(Morocco) AS FAR
10	CB	Mohamed Zaroili	13 April 2003 (aged 17)	1.75 m	43	120	(France) HBC Gien Loiret
12	GK	Alae Laaroussi	20 April 1983 (aged 37)	1.90 m	52	6	(Morocco) Mountada El Fida
13	RB	Hicham Hakimi	5 December 1990 (aged 30)	1.91 m	40	150	(Morocco) AS FAR
15	P	Younes Ouzrour	19 March 2002 (aged 18)	1.92 m	0	0	(France) Pontault-Combault Handball
18	LB	Lahcen Bellimam	19 September 1989 (aged 31)	1.94 m	30	20	(France) Élite Val d'Oise Handball
21	RB	Nacym Fougani	21 January 2002 (aged 18)	1.83 m	20	40	Tremblay-en-France Handball
24	LB	Mohammed Ezzine	24 February 1999 (aged 21)	1.90 m	26	245	(Morocco) AS FAR
27	CB	Sami Lamdakkar	18 March 2002 (aged 18)	1.85 m	26	35	(France) Frontignan Thau Handball
46	CB	Amine Harchaoui	27 September 1990 (aged 30)	1.87 m	36	100	(Morocco) Raja d'Agadir
91	P	Achraf Adli	25 January 1989 (aged 31)	1.91 m	70	245	(France) HC Cournon d'Auvergne
92	LB	Hassan El-Kachradi	29 January 1992 (aged 28)	1.80 m	6	15	(Morocco) Raja d'Agadir
93	LW	Ryad Lakbi	4 May 1999 (aged 21)	1.78 m	20	6	Tremblay-en-France Handball
94	P	Mehdi Ismaili	4 January 1992 (aged 29)	1.91 m	50	60	(Morocco) Widad Smara dé Handball
96	GK	Youssef El-Mouaddar	13 April 2003 (aged 17)	1.80 m	26	0	(France) Élite Val d'Oise Handball
97	P	Said El-Makki	17 May 1997 (aged 23)	1.98 m	35	95	(Morocco) Mountada El Fida
99	P	Nabil Slassi	19 September 1995 (aged 25)	1.94 m	30	50	(France) Caen Handball

=== Portugal ===
A 19-player squad was announced on 30 October 2020.

Head coach: Paulo Pereira

No.	Pos.	Name	Date of birth (age)	Height	App.	Goals	Club
1	GK	Alfredo Quintana	20 March 1988 (aged 32)	2.01 m	58	9	(Portugal) FC Porto
4	RW	Pedro Portela	6 January 1990 (aged 31)	1.86 m	90	295	Tremblay-en-France Handball
5	LB	Gilberto Duarte	6 July 1990 (aged 30)	1.97 m	93	288	(France) Montpellier Handball
8	P	Victor Iturriza	22 May 1990 (aged 30)	1.93 m	2	8	(Portugal) FC Porto
9	RB	João Ferraz	8 January 1990 (aged 31)	1.96 m	79	153	(Switzerland) HSC Suhr Aarau
10	CB	Miguel Martins	4 November 1997 (aged 23)	1.92 m	45	91	(Portugal) FC Porto
11	RB	Belone Moreira	1 June 1990 (aged 30)	1.80 m	16	21	(Portugal) S.L. Benfica
14	CB	Rui Silva	28 April 1993 (aged 27)	1.86 m	80	128	(Portugal) FC Porto
15	P	Daymaro Salina	1 September 1987 (aged 33)	2.00 m	45	82	(Portugal) FC Porto
16	GK	Humberto Gomes	1 January 1978 (aged 43)	1.93 m	75	0	(Portugal) Póvoa AC
22	P	Alexis Borges	6 October 1991 (aged 29)	1.96 m	32	56	(France) Montpellier Handball
23	LW	Diogo Branquinho	25 July 1994 (aged 26)	1.80 m	42	97	(Portugal) FC Porto
24	LB	Alexandre Cavalcanti	27 December 1996 (aged 24)	2.02 m	37	35	(France) HBC Nantes
25	RW	António Areia	21 June 1990 (aged 30)	1.90 m	45	126	(Portugal) FC Porto
27	LB	André Gomes	27 July 1998 (aged 22)	1.92 m	19	35	(Portugal) FC Porto
30	LW	Leonel Fernandes	12 March 1998 (aged 22)	1.91 m	1	2	(Portugal) FC Porto
33	RB	Diogo Silva	2 July 1998 (aged 22)	1.98 m	5	6	(Portugal) FC Porto
41	GK	Gustavo Capdeville	31 August 1997 (aged 23)	1.89 m	9	0	(Portugal) S.L. Benfica
82	P	Luís Frade	11 September 1998 (aged 22)	1.94 m	21	28	(Spain) FC Barcelona
88	LB	Fábio Magalhães	12 March 1988 (aged 32)	1.94 m	139	290	(Portugal) FC Porto

== Group G ==
=== Chile ===
A 20-player squad was announced on 21 December 2020.

Head coach: (Spain) Mateo Garralda

No.	Pos.	Name	Date of birth (age)	Height	App.	Goals	Club
1	GK	Felipe Barrientos	12 June 1984 (aged 36)	1.84 m	93	2	Unattached
2	LW	Sebastián Ceballos	1 July 1992 (aged 28)	1.76 m	47	74	(Portugal) ABC/UMinho
4	LB	Erwin Feuchtmann	2 May 1990 (aged 30)	1.90 m	51	220	(Spain) CB Ademar León
6	CB	Arian Delgado	25 August 2001 (aged 19)	1.80 m	2	6	(Chile) Liceo Nacional de Maipu
7	LB	Diego Reyes	24 July 1992 (aged 28)	1.85 m	38	50	(Spain) BM Los Dólmenes
9	P	Javier Frelijj	28 January 1991 (aged 29)	1.91 m	43	55	(Chile) CD Luterano
10	CB	Emil Feuchtmann	1 June 1983 (aged 37)	1.78 m	122	325	(Spain) BM Benidorm
11	P	Esteban Salinas	18 January 1992 (aged 28)	1.83 m	58	110	(Spain) BM Granollers
12	GK	Felipe García	26 October 1993 (aged 27)	1.90 m	31	1	(Chile) Italiano BM
14	P	Benjamin Illesca	4 February 2000 (aged 20)	1.96 m	0	0	(Portugal) Boa-Hora
16	GK	Vicente González	30 September 1999 (aged 21)	1.92 m	2	0	(Spain) Córdoba de Balonmano
17	RB	Rodrigo Salinas Muñoz	25 February 1989 (aged 31)	1.89 m	81	225	(Spain) CD Bidasoa
18	CB	Julio Baumann	29 January 1998 (aged 22)	1.83 m	2	20	(Spain) CAB Cartagena
20	RW	Sebastián Pavez	30 August 1996 (aged 24)	1.82 m	7	16	(Portugal) SC da Horta
21	LW	Harald Feuchtmann	21 December 1987 (aged 33)	1.76 m	39	60	(Sweden) Skogås HK
23	LW	Benjamín Callejas	2 May 1990 (aged 30)	1.71 m	6	5	Unattached
29	P	Marco Oneto	3 June 1982 (aged 38)	2.04 m	113	190	Unattached
30	RB	Daniel Ayala	30 December 1995 (aged 25)	1.77 m	19	40	(Spain) Córdoba de Balonmano
44	LB	Aaron Codina	19 February 1999 (aged 21)	1.93 m	12	20	(France) Fenix Toulouse Handball
77	LB	Víctor Donoso	27 November 1990 (aged 30)	1.90 m	43	55	(Czech Republic) KH Kopřivnice

=== Egypt ===
A 21-player squad was announced on 27 December 2020.

Head coach: (Spain) Roberto García Parrondo

No.	Pos.	Name	Date of birth (age)	Height	App.	Goals	Club
5	RB	Yahia Omar	9 September 1997 (aged 23)	1.94 m	24	52	(Hungary) Veszprém
9	CB	Islam Hassan	2 July 1988 (aged 32)	1.84 m	194	127	(Egypt) Al Ahly
10	LB	Abdelrahman Abdou	30 January 1996 (aged 24)	1.92 m	10	2	(Egypt) Al Ahly
11	LW	Ahmed Momen Safa	18 March 1993 (aged 27)	1.76 m	27	16	(Egypt) Zamalek
15	LB	Ahmed Hesham	15 May 2000 (aged 20)	1.91 m	9	15	(France) USAM Nîmes Gard
24	P	Ibrahim El-Masry	11 March 1989 (aged 31)	1.92 m	218	25	(Egypt) Al Ahly
25	P	Wisam Nawar	14 February 1990 (aged 30)	1.84 m	78	37	(Egypt) Zamalek
31	LW	Omar El-Wakil	14 May 1988 (aged 32)	1.74 m	174	212	(Egypt) Zamalek
39	LB	Yehia El-Deraa	17 July 1995 (aged 25)	1.92 m	112	97	(Egypt) Zamalek
42	LB	Hassan Kaddah	1 May 2000 (aged 20)	2.05 m	8	6	(Egypt) Zamalek
45	CB	Seif El-Deraa	19 September 1998 (aged 22)	1.87 m	8	14	(Egypt) Heliopolis
53	RW	Akram Saad	22 November 1994 (aged 26)	1.72 m	12	7	(Egypt) Zamalek
55	RB	Mohsen Ramadan	11 March 1998 (aged 22)	1.92 m	12	8	(Egypt) Al Ahly
66	RB	Ahmed El-Ahmar	27 January 1984 (aged 36)	1.86 m	315	1402	(Egypt) Zamalek
79	LW	Ahmed Nafea	1 September 1997 (aged 23)	1.82 m	0	0	(Egypt) Al Ahly
88	GK	Karim Handawy	1 May 1988 (aged 32)	1.88 m	132	0	(Romania) HC Dobrogea Sud Constanța
89	P	Mohamed Mamdouh Shebib	1 April 1989 (aged 31)	1.94 m	213	186	(Romania) Dinamo București
90	LB	Ali Zein	14 December 1990 (aged 30)	1.93 m	268	320	(United Arab Emirates) Sharjah
91	RW	Mohamed Sanad	16 January 1991 (aged 29)	1.88 m	121	237	(France) USAM Nîmes Gard
96	GK	Mohamed El-Tayar	7 April 1996 (aged 24)	1.91 m	18	0	(Egypt) Al Ahly

=== North Macedonia ===
A 20-player squad was announced on 12 January 2021.

Head coach: Danilo Brestovac

No.	Pos.	Name	Date of birth (age)	Height	App.	Goals	Club
1	GK	Nikola Mitrevski	3 October 1985 (aged 35)	1.88 m	41	2	(Portugal) FC Porto
4	RB	Martin Velkovski	10 March 1997 (aged 23)	1.90 m	6	7	(North Macedonia) RK Eurofarm Pelister
5	P	Stojanče Stoilov	30 April 1987 (aged 33)	1.91 m	67	143	(North Macedonia) RK Vardar 1961
6	LW	Dimitar Dimitrioski	16 February 1998 (aged 22)	1.82 m	0	0	(North Macedonia) RK Vardar 1961
7	RB	Kiril Lazarov	10 May 1980 (aged 40)	1.93 m	207	1443	(France) HBC Nantes
8	LW	Cvetan Kuzmanoski	5 December 1999 (aged 21)	1.90 m	0	0	(North Macedonia) RK Eurofarm Pelister 2
11	LB	Filip Taleski	28 March 1996 (aged 24)	2.00 m	43	109	(North Macedonia) RK Vardar 1961
12	GK	Martin Tomovski	10 July 1997 (aged 23)	1.90 m	0	0	(Germany) Die Eulen Ludwigshafen
17	P	Nikola Markoski	22 May 1990 (aged 30)	1.95 m	17	12	(North Macedonia) RK Eurofarm Pelister
18	LB	Filip Kuzmanovski	3 July 1996 (aged 24)	1.98 m	38	61	(Germany) TSV Hannover-Burgdorf
19	RW	Nenad Kosteski	4 March 2001 (aged 19)	1.80 m	0	0	(North Macedonia) RK Eurofarm Pelister
20	GK	Nikola Danilovski	1 February 1997 (aged 23)	1.84 m	0	0	(North Macedonia) GRK Ohrid
21	CB	Mario Tankoski	28 August 1998 (aged 22)	1.92 m	12	5	(North Macedonia) RK Eurofarm Pelister
25	CB	Goran Krstevski	29 March 1996 (aged 24)	1.96 m	9	2	(Romania) CSM Focșani
28	RW	Martin Popovski	26 August 1994 (aged 26)	1.77 m	26	19	(Switzerland) GC Amicitia Zürich
29	LB	Darko Georgievski	3 February 1992 (aged 28)	1.92 m	0	0	(France) Angers SCO
31	LB	Mihajlo Mladenovikj	21 September 2000 (aged 20)	1.94 m	0	0	(North Macedonia) RK Metalurg Skopje
33	P	Žarko Peševski	11 April 1991 (aged 29)	1.95 m	39	69	(Germany) TVB 1898 Stuttgart
77	RB	Martin Serafimov	3 March 2000 (aged 20)	1.90 m	7	1	(North Macedonia) RK Metalurg Skopje
97	CB	Marko Miševski	23 August 1999 (aged 21)	1.99 m	3	0	(North Macedonia) RK Vardar 1961

=== Sweden ===
A 19-player squad was announced on 17 December 2020.

Head coach: (Norway) Glenn Solberg

No.	Pos.	Name	Date of birth (age)	Height	App.	Goals	Club
1	GK	Peter Johannesson	12 May 1992 (aged 28)	1.91 m	14	0	(Germany) TBV Lemgo
2	LB	Jonathan Carlsbogård	19 April 1995 (aged 25)	1.95 m	1	1	(Germany) TBV Lemgo
5	P	Max Darj	27 September 1991 (aged 29)	1.92 m	65	37	(Germany) Bergischer HC
7	RB	Jack Thurin	9 June 1999 (aged 21)	1.99 m	10	17	(Sweden) IFK Skövde
8	LB	Alfred Jönsson	21 February 1998 (aged 22)	1.93 m	2	1	(Germany) TSV Hannover-Burgdorf
11	RW	Daniel Pettersson	6 May 1992 (aged 28)	1.79 m	28	86	(Germany) SC Magdeburg
12	GK	Andreas Palicka	10 July 1986 (aged 34)	1.89 m	105	6	(Germany) Rhein-Neckar Löwen
15	LW	Hampus Wanne	10 December 1993 (aged 27)	1.85 m	33	79	(Germany) SG Flensburg-Handewitt
16	GK	Mikael Aggefors	20 January 1985 (aged 35)	1.91 m	19	0	(Denmark) Aalborg Håndbold
18	P	Fredric Pettersson	11 February 1989 (aged 31)	2.01 m	56	77	(France) Montpellier Handball
19	CB	Felix Claar	5 January 1997 (aged 24)	1.92 m	9	11	(Denmark) Aalborg Håndbold
22	LW	Lucas Pellas	28 August 1995 (aged 25)	1.83 m	15	41	(France) Montpellier Handball
23	RB	Albin Lagergren	11 September 1992 (aged 28)	1.86 m	52	149	(Germany) Rhein-Neckar Löwen
24	CB	Jim Gottfridsson	2 September 1992 (aged 28)	1.91 m	90	309	(Germany) SG Flensburg-Handewitt
26	RB	Linus Persson	16 April 1993 (aged 27)	1.91 m	18	27	(France) US Ivry Handball
27	LB	Oskar Sunnefeldt	21 April 1998 (aged 22)	1.98 m	2	8	(Germany) THW Kiel
28	CB	Jonathan Edvardsson	7 April 1997 (aged 23)	1.90 m	1	0	(Sweden) IK Sävehof
32	P	Oscar Bergendahl	8 March 1995 (aged 25)	1.92 m	9	18	(Denmark) GOG Håndbold
33	RB	Lukas Sandell	3 February 1997 (aged 23)	1.93 m	0	0	(Denmark) Aalborg Håndbold
62	RW	Valter Chrintz	26 April 2000 (aged 20)	1.84 m	15	19	(Germany) Füchse Berlin
66	P	Anton Lindskog	7 December 1993 (aged 27)	1.98 m	14	12	(Germany) HSG Wetzlar

== Group H ==
=== Belarus ===
A 24-player squad was announced on 30 December 2020. It was cut to 20 on 10 January 2021.

Head coach: Yuri Shevtsov

No.	Pos.	Name	Date of birth (age)	Height	App.	Goals	Club
1	GK	Ivan Matskevich	8 May 1991 (aged 29)	1.91 m	90	5	(Belarus) Meshkov Brest
2	RW	Aliaksandr Lukashevich	5 March 1998 (aged 22)	1.92 m	0	0	(Belarus) Kronon Grodno
3	LB	Uladzislau Kulesh	28 May 1996 (aged 24)	2.06 m	68	199	(Poland) Łomża Vive Kielce
7	CB	Artsiom Kulak	23 February 1996 (aged 24)	1.90 m	13	21	(Russia) Chekhovskiye Medvedi
8	LB	Artur Rudz	10 September 1998 (aged 22)	1.94 m	0	0	(Belarus) SKA Minsk
9	RB	Aleh Astrashapkin	20 January 1992 (aged 28)	1.90 m	33	44	(Russia) CSKA Moscow
17	LW	Uladzislau Kryvenka	21 April 1999 (aged 21)	1.90 m	0	0	(Belarus) SKA Minsk
20	GK	Aliaksei Kishou	23 September 1986 (aged 34)	1.91 m	51	1	(Switzerland) HC STV Schwyz
23	LW	Andrei Yurynok	21 September 1996 (aged 24)	1.96 m	71	110	(Belarus) Meshkov Brest
25	RB	Pavel Duda	5 December 1996 (aged 24)	1.88 m	0	0	(Belarus) Masheka Mogilev
33	GK	Ivan Maroz	5 October 1992 (aged 28)	1.94 m	7	0	(Ukraine) Motor Zaporizhia
42	P	Aliaksei Ushal	15 March 1990 (aged 30)	1.98 m	5	0	(Hungary) Orosházi FKSE
43	P	Artsiom Selviasiuk	8 December 1992 (aged 28)	1.93 m	0	0	(Belarus) Meshkov Brest
47	CB	Aliaksandr Padshyvalau	8 March 1996 (aged 24)	1.90 m	55	81	(Germany) GWD Minden
50	P	Artsem Karalek	20 February 1996 (aged 24)	1.96 m	78	265	(Poland) Łomża Vive Kielce
55	RW	Mikita Vailupau	30 July 1995 (aged 25)	1.89 m	26	89	(Belarus) Meshkov Brest
62	LB	Kiryl Samoila	31 January 2002 (aged 18)	1.98 m	0	0	(Belarus) SKA Minsk
74	P	Viachaslau Bokhan	7 April 1996 (aged 24)	2.07 m	31	5	(Ukraine) Motor Zaporizhia
95	LB	Vadim Gayduchenko	24 April 1995 (aged 25)	1.92 m	63	136	(France) Saint-Raphaël Var Handball
98	RB	Mikalai Aliokhin	9 April 1998 (aged 22)	1.90 m	15	22	(Belarus) SKA Minsk

=== Russian Handball Federation Team ===
A 20-player squad was announced on 24 December 2020.

Head coach: (Germany) Velimir Petković

No.	Pos.	Name	Date of birth (age)	Height	App.	Goals	Club
5	RB	Dmitrii Kiselev	15 November 1994 (aged 26)	1.93 m	49	126	(Russia) Chekhovskiye Medvedi
14	LB	Ilia Belevtsov	1 May 2000 (aged 20)	1.98 m	2	0	(Russia) SKIF Krasnodar
16	GK	Dmitry Pavlenko	1 January 1991 (aged 30)	1.90 m	34	0	(Russia) Chekhovskiye Medvedi
17	RB	Alexander Kotov	11 July 1994 (aged 26)	1.98 m	25	20	(Russia) Chekhovskiye Medvedi
22	P	Viacheslav Kasatkin	2 September 1996 (aged 24)	1.84 m	0	0	(Romania) CSM Vaslui
23	LW	Roman Ostashchenko	26 September 1992 (aged 28)	1.90 m	34	33	(Russia) Chekhovskiye Medvedi
24	RW	Dmitry Kornev	16 June 1992 (aged 28)	1.86 m	14	19	(Russia) Chekhovskiye Medvedi
27	P	Denis Vasilev	31 December 1993 (aged 27)	1.98 m	21	17	(France) C' Chartres Métropole Handball
28	LB	Sergey Kudinov	29 June 1991 (aged 29)	1.91 m	34	25	(France) C' Chartres Métropole Handball
30	P	Aleksandr Ermakov	14 January 1996 (aged 24)	1.96 m	11	15	(Russia) Chekhovskiye Medvedi
33	RW	Daniil Shishkaryov	6 July 1988 (aged 32)	1.89 m	133	333	(Hungary) Veszprém KC
36	RB	Sergei Ivanov	16 October 2000 (aged 20)	2.00 m	2	1	(Russia) SKIF Krasnodar
44	LW	Igor Soroka	27 May 1991 (aged 29)	1.80 m	58	160	(Russia) CSKA Moscow
55	LB	Azat Valiullin	1 September 1990 (aged 30)	2.07 m	12	30	(Germany) TSG Friesenheim
76	GK	Stanislav Tretynko	30 December 1993 (aged 27)	1.93 m	0	0	(Russia) SGAU-Saratov
78	P	Pavel Andreev	19 July 1992 (aged 28)	1.95 m	14	32	(Russia) Chekhovskiye Medvedi
87	GK	Viktor Kireyev	5 May 1987 (aged 33)	1.90 m	71	1	(Russia) CSKA Moscow
89	CB	Dmitry Zhitnikov	20 November 1989 (aged 31)	1.95 m	133	342	(Hungary) MOL-Pick Szeged
97	RW	Aleksei Fokin	29 August 1997 (aged 23)	1.80 m	15	15	(Russia) CSKA Moscow
99	LB	Sergei Kosorotov	16 June 1999 (aged 21)	1.95 m	27	47	(Russia) Chekhovskiye Medvedi

=== Slovenia ===
A 21-player squad was announced on 15 December 2020.

Head coach: (Sweden) Ljubomir Vranjes

No.	Pos.	Name	Date of birth (age)	Height	App.	Goals	Club
2	CB	Staš Skube	15 November 1989 (aged 31)	1.79 m	17	32	(Belarus) Meshkov Brest
3	P	Blaž Blagotinšek	17 January 1994 (aged 26)	2.02 m	89	154	(Hungary) Telekom Veszprém
5	LB	Nik Henigman	4 December 1995 (aged 25)	2.01 m	50	79	(Hungary) MOL-Pick Szeged
8	RW	Blaž Janc	20 November 1996 (aged 24)	1.86 m	64	212	(Spain) FC Barcelona
11	RB	Jure Dolenec	6 December 1988 (aged 32)	1.91 m	145	520	(Spain) FC Barcelona
13	LW	Darko Cingesar	25 July 1990 (aged 30)	1.87 m	76	126	(Slovenia) RK Trimo Trebnje
16	GK	Miljan Vujović	27 August 2000 (aged 20)	1.98 m	0	0	(Slovenia) Celje Pivovarna Laško
17	RB	Nejc Cehte	4 September 1992 (aged 28)	1.96 m	28	45	(Germany) TSV Hannover-Burgdorf
21	RW	Dragan Gajić	21 June 1984 (aged 36)	1.88 m	151	642	(France) Limoges
22	P	Matej Gaber	22 June 1991 (aged 29)	1.98 m	120	166	(Hungary) MOL-Pick Szeged
23	CB	Miha Zarabec	12 October 1991 (aged 29)	1.87 m	64	156	(Germany) THW Kiel
26	GK	Klemen Ferlin	26 June 1989 (aged 31)	1.92 m	37	1	(Germany) HC Erlangen
31	LW	Tadej Mazej	31 July 1998 (aged 22)	1.90 m	0	0	(Slovenia) Celje Pivovarna Laško
34	CB	Rok Ovniček	29 January 1995 (aged 25)	1.85 m	23	23	(France) HBC Nantes
35	CB	Domen Makuc	1 July 2000 (aged 20)	1.88 m	0	0	(Spain) FC Barcelona
44	CB	Dean Bombač	4 April 1989 (aged 31)	1.90 m	89	168	(Hungary) MOL-Pick Szeged
51	LB	Borut Mačkovšek	11 September 1992 (aged 28)	2.04 m	108	254	(Hungary) MOL-Pick Szeged
90	GK	Urban Lesjak	24 August 1990 (aged 30)	1.87 m	47	0	(Germany) TSV Hannover-Burgdorf
95	P	Matic Suholežnik	2 May 1995 (aged 25)	2.02 m	25	24	(Portugal) S.L. Benfica

=== South Korea ===
Head coach: Kang Il-koo

No.	Pos.	Name	Date of birth (age)	Height	App.	Goals	Club
8	P	Kim Hyeon-woo	30 January 2000 (aged 20)	1.85 m	0	0	(South Korea) Kangwon National University
10	RW	Yu Chan-min	1 February 2000 (aged 20)	1.80 m	0	0	(South Korea) Korea National Sport University
13	RW	Lee Jun-hee	16 August 2000 (aged 20)	1.80 m	0	0	(South Korea) Wonkwang University
19	RB	Baek Seung-geon	19 February 1999 (aged 21)	1.80 m	0	0	(South Korea) Kangwon National University
21	LW	Lee Seung-min	9 December 2001 (aged 19)	1.81 m	0	0	(South Korea) Wonkwang University
22	LW	Lee Byeong-ju	6 July 1999 (aged 21)	1.83 m	0	0	(South Korea) Korea National Sport University
23	CB	Jeon Young-je	24 February 1999 (aged 21)	1.82 m	0	0	(South Korea) Kangwon National University
24	CB	Kim Myeong-jong	6 April 2000 (aged 20)	1.81 m	0	0	(South Korea) Chosun University
26	RW	Kim Jin-young	2 February 2000 (aged 20)	1.85 m	0	0	(South Korea) Kyung Hee University
27	RW	Yu Myeong-han	28 January 2001 (aged 19)	1.85 m	0	0	(South Korea) Chungnam National University
28	LW	Kim Jin-ho	19 November 1999 (aged 21)	1.79 m	0	0	(South Korea) Korea National Sport University
32	LW	Jo Dong-hyeon	4 September 2000 (aged 20)	1.78 m	0	0	(South Korea) Korea National Sport University
33	LB	Kim Jae-soon	3 November 1998 (aged 22)	1.86 m	0	0	(South Korea) Wonkwang University
34	RW	Kim Young-gil	4 May 1999 (aged 21)	1.80 m	0	0	(South Korea) Kyung Hee University
77	GK	Lee Chang-woo	27 April 2003 (aged 17)	1.90 m	0	0	(South Korea) Daejeon Daeseong High School
83	P	Kang Jun-gu	31 July 2001 (aged 19)	1.81 m	0	0	(South Korea) Chosun University
87	RB	Kim Ji-un	29 December 2000 (aged 20)	1.86 m	0	0	(South Korea) Korea National Sport University
88	GK	Jang Jun-young	16 February 1998 (aged 22)	1.86 m	0	0	(South Korea) Kyung Hee University
97	P	Kim Tae-ung	26 October 2000 (aged 20)	1.90 m	0	0	(South Korea) Wonkwang University
98	GK	An Jae-pil	1 August 1998 (aged 22)	1.80 m	0	0	(South Korea) Chosun University
