= 2016 African Men's Handball Championship squads =

Every team has to submit a roster of 16 players.

== Algeria ==
2016 African Handball Championship - 4th place
Head coach: (Algeria) Salah Bouchekriou

| No. | Pos. | Name | Date of birth (age) | Height | App. | Goals | Club |
|---|---|---|---|---|---|---|---|
| 2 | RB | Anis Zamoum | 10 December 1990 (aged 25) | 1.88 m | | | (Algeria) GS Pétroliers |
| 3 | LB | Omar Chehbour | 4 June 1984 (aged 31) | 1.85 m | | | (Algeria) GS Pétroliers |
| 6 | LB | Messaoud Berkous | 20 July 1989 (aged 26) | 1.92 m | | | (Algeria) GS Pétroliers |
| 7 | LW | Hichem Daoud | 9 January 1992 (aged 24) | 1.90 m | | | (France) Istres PH |
| 8 | B | Oussama Boudjenah | 22 August 1993 (aged 22) | 1.99 m | | | (Algeria) JSE Skikda |
| 10 | RB | Sassi Boultif | 9 January 1983 (aged 33) | 1.91 m | | | (United Arab Emirates) Al-Nasr |
| 12 | GK | Abdellah Benmenni | 19 August 1986 (aged 29) | 1.88 m | | | (Algeria) GS Pétroliers |
| 14 | | Abderaouf Djelabi | | 1.92 m | | | (Algeria) O. El Oued |
| 15 | RW | Redouane Saker | 1 October 1991 (aged 24) | 1.76 m | | | (Algeria) JSE Skikda |
| 17 | RB | Abderrahim Berriah | 19 January 1988 (aged 28) | 1.95 m | | | (Algeria) GS Pétroliers |
| 19 | LW | Ayatallah Hamoud | 10 August 1990 (aged 25) | 1.86 m | | | (Algeria) ES Ain Touta |
| 21 | P | Mohamed Mokrani | 31 January 1981 (aged 34) | 1.86 m | | | (France) US Créteil |
| 22 | GK | Khalifa Ghedbane | 26 November 1996 (aged 19) | 2.06 m | | | (Algeria) GS Pétroliers |
| 25 | RW | Sylvain Kieffer | 6 July 1983 (aged 32) | 1.69 m | | | (France) Chartres Métropole |
| 36 | CB | Abdelkader Rahim | 12 July 1990 (aged 25) | 1.84 m | | | (France) Istres PH |
| 87 | RB | Ayoub Abdi | | 1.92 m | | | (Algeria) CRB Baraki |

== Angola ==
2016 African Handball Championship - Bronze medal
Head coach: (Angola) Filipe Cruz

| No. | Pos. | Name | Date of birth (age) | Height | App. | Goals | Club |
|---|---|---|---|---|---|---|---|
| 1 | GK | Julião Gaspar | 28 March 1990 (aged 25) | 1.90 m | | | (Angola) G.D. Interclube |
| 2 | CB | Cláudio Lopes | 28 February 1992 (aged 23) | 1.70 | | | (Angola) Primeiro de Agosto |
| 3 | RW | Elsemar Pedro | 4 April 1990 (aged 25) | 1.70 | | | (Angola) Primeiro de Agosto |
| 4 | P | Augusto Dinzeia | 16 April 1985 (aged 30) | 2.00 | | | (Angola) Primeiro de Agosto |
| 5 | CB | Romé Hebo | 11 April 1992 (aged 23) | 1.90 | | | (Angola) Primeiro de Agosto |
| 6 | RB | Osvaldo Mulenessa | 3 February 1986 (aged 29) | 1.70 | | | (Angola) Primeiro de Agosto |
| 7 | LW | Elias António | 30 May 1987 (aged 28) | 1.70 m | | | (Angola) Primeiro de Agosto |
| 9 | CB | Adilson Maneco | 2 March 1993 (aged 22) | 1.70 | | | (Angola) Primeiro de Agosto |
| 10 | P | Agnelo Quitongo | 22 November 1991 (aged 24) | 1.90 | | | (Angola) Primeiro de Agosto |
| 11 | P | Gabriel Teca | 2 February 1991 (aged 24) | 2.00 m | | | (Angola) Primeiro de Agosto |
| 13 | CB | Manuel Nascimento | 15 March 1994 (aged 21) | 1.80 m | | | (Angola) Marinha de Guerra |
| 14 | B | Ênio Sousa | 19 July 1994 (aged 21) | 1.90 m | | | (Angola) Marinha de Guerra |
| 17 | LB | Sérgio Lopes | 2 June 1983 (aged 32) | 1.90 m | | | (Angola) Primeiro de Agosto |
| 20 | GK | Giovane Muachissengue | 20 February 1984 (aged 31) | 1.80 m | | | (Angola) Primeiro de Agosto |
| 21 | RW | Adelino Pestana | 11 March 1992 (aged 23) | 1.80 m | | | (Angola) G.D. Interclube |
| 79 | RW | Edvaldo Ferreira | 28 May 1990 (aged 25) | 2.00 m | | | (Angola) Primeiro de Agosto |

== Cameroon ==
2016 African Handball Championship - 5th place
Head coach: (Cameroon) Honoré Konguep

| No. | Pos. | Name | Date of birth (age) | Height | App. | Goals | Club |
|---|---|---|---|---|---|---|---|
| 1 | GK | Ticha Teyim | | | | | (Cameroon) Fanz |
| 2 | B | Zuwed Akuro | | 1.85 m | | | (Cameroon) Université Buea |
| 3 | | Félix Atangana | | | | | (Cameroon) Minuh Yaoundé |
| 5 | | Jerry Bekono | | | | | (Cameroon) FAP Yaoundé |
| 6 | | Claude Tchinda | | | | | (France) Amiens Picardie |
| 7 | | Yannick Bindzi | 20 October 1990 (aged 25) | 1.80 m | | | (Cameroon) FAP Yaoundé |
| 8 | | Michael Chuala | | 1.88 m | | | (Angola) Interclube |
| 9 | | Junior Ngabou | | | | | (Cameroon) Université Buea |
| 10 | | William Fankoua | | | | | (Angola) Interclube |
| 11 | RB | Evaris Muyembo | 8 May 1986 (aged 29) | 1.85 m | | | (France) USM Saran |
| 13 | | Daniel Tongmen | | | | | (Morocco) Rabita Casablanca |
| 14 | | Christian Awana | | | | | (Cameroon) Fanz |
| 15 | | Lancelot Enoh | 13 October 1986 (aged 29) | | | | (Cameroon) FAP Yaoundé |
| 16 | | Nelvis Tohmuloh | | | | | (Cameroon) FAP Yaoundé |
| 17 | | Fabrice Noah | | | | | (Democratic Republic of the Congo) JS Kinshasa |
| 22 | | Berlin Tietchop | | | | | (Democratic Republic of the Congo) JS Kinshasa |

== Egypt ==
2016 African Handball Championship - Gold medal
Head coach: (Egypt) Marwan Ragab

| No. | Pos. | Name | Date of birth (age) | Height | App. | Goals | Club |
|---|---|---|---|---|---|---|---|
| 3 | RB | Mamdouh Abouebaid | 1 January 1988 (aged 28) | 1.89 m | | | (Egypt) Al Ahly |
| 8 | P | Mahmoud Ramadan | 7 March 1984 (aged 31) | 1.87 M | | | (Egypt) Al Ahly |
| 9 | CB | Eslam Issa | 2 July 1988 (aged 27) | 1.90 m | | | (Egypt) Al Ahly |
| 15 | RW | Mohamed Amer | 12 December 1987 (aged 28) | 1.86 m | | | (Egypt) Al Ahly |
| 18 | B | Aly Soliman | 22 August 1993 (aged 22) | 1.99 m |
| 19 | CB | Mohamed El-Bassiouny | 10 May 1990 (aged 25) | 1.84 m | | | (Egypt) Alexandria SC |
| 20 | CB | Mohamed Alaa Hashem | 23 January 1988 (aged 28) | 1.78 m |
| 22 | ? | Ahmed Alaa |
| 24 | P | Ibrahim El-Masry | 11 March 1989 (aged 26) | 1.91 m | | | (Egypt) Al Ahly |
| 25 | P | Wisam Nawar | 14 February 1990 (aged 25) | 1.88 m | | | (Egypt) Alexandria SC |
| ?? | ? | Mohab Khallaf |
| 66 | RB | Ahmed El-Ahmar | 27 January 1984 (aged 32) | 1.84 m | | | (Egypt) Zamalek |
| 72 | GK | Mahmoud Khalil | 1 June 1991 (aged 24) | 1.92 m | | | (Qatar) El Jaish |
| 77 | LW | Hossam Khedr | 21 January 1990 (aged 26) | 1.83 m |
| 88 | GK | Karim Handawy | 11 May 1988 (aged 27) | 1.88 m | | | (Egypt) Zamalek |
| 89 | P | Mohamed Mamdouh | 1 April 1989 (aged 26) | 1.92 m | | | (France) PAUC Handball |
| 90 | LB | Aly Mohamed | 14 December 1990 (aged 25) | 1.90 m | | | (United Arab Emirates) Al Jazira |
| 91 | RW | Mohamed Sanad | 16 January 1991 (aged 25) | 1.89 m | | | (Hungary) Komlói Bányász |

== Gabon ==
2016 African Handball Championship - 11th place
Head coach: ?

| No. | Pos. | Name | Date of birth (age) | Height | App. | Goals | Club |
|---|---|---|---|---|---|---|---|
| 1 | GK | Rufin Essono Eny |
| 2 | | Hugues Ferly Boubala Yembi |
| 3 | | Régis Thauryn Djimbi |
| 5 | | Damien Boubala |
| 6 | | Carl Ozana Dekunia Tsagoulela Nzamba |
| 7 | | Guillaume Tire |
| 8 | | Sterenstyl Wora Mamadou |
| 9 | | Willy Moure Nguema |
| 10 | | Cherubin Tabanguet |
| 11 | | Ange Junior Obame |
| 13 | | Yannick Christian Aubyang Milama |
| 14 | | Ousmane Camara |
| 16 | GK | Guillaume Tire |
| 17 | | Semeglo Kossi Sassou |
| 19 | | Yorick Davy Aubyang Milama |
| 21 | | Terence Igalla Mamadou Sene |
| | | Charny Struld Otsinda Leckibi |
| | | Stéphane Warene Nze Mba |
| | | Beaujency Owono Ondo |

== Morocco ==
2016 African Handball Championship - 6th place
Head coach: (Morocco) Noureddine Bouhaddioui

| No. | Pos. | Name | Date of birth (age) | Height | App. | Goals | Club |
|---|---|---|---|---|---|---|---|
| 1 | GK | Yassine Idrissi | 13 January 1984 (aged 32) | 1.95 m | | | (France) USAM Nîmes |
| 2 | | Amine Harchaoui |
| 3 | | Rachid Hamed |
| 8 | | Mohammed Amine |
| 9 | | Mehdi Ighirri | | | | | (France) Mulhouse HSA |
| 10 | | Mohamed Zeroili |
| 11 | CB | Seufyann Sayad | | | | | (Spain) CB Puerto Sagunto |
| 18 | | Hicham Hammadi | | | | | (France) Angers-Noyant |
| 19 | | Fayçal Souhir |
| 27 | GK | Abderrahim Chohou |
| 29 | | Lahcen Bellimam |
| 45 | CB | Soufian Idir | 14 April 1990 (aged 25) | 1.85 m | | | (France) Epinal |
| 83 | | Saïd Ouksir | | | | | (Romania) Steaua București |
| 91 | | Achraf Adli |
| 92 | | Smail Alaoui |

== Tunisia ==
2016 African Handball Championship - Silver medal
Head coach: (France) Sylvain Nouet

| No. | Pos. | Name | Date of birth (age) | Height | App. | Goals | Club |
|---|---|---|---|---|---|---|---|
| 1 | GK | Majed Hamza | 8 February 1983 (aged 32) | 1.89 m | | | (Tunisia) Étoile du Sahel |
| 3 | LB | Selim Hedoui | 1 October 1983 (aged 32) | 1.97 m | | | (United Arab Emirates) Sharjah HC |
| 5 | P | Mahmoud Gharbi | 11 February 1982 (aged 33) | 1.92 m | | | (France) HBC Nantes |
| 9 | RB | Amine Bannour | 21 February 1990 (aged 25) | 1.97 m | | | (Tunisia) Club Africain |
| 12 | GK | Marouen Maggaiz | 28 July 1983 (aged 32) | 1.91 m | | | (Tunisia) Espérance Tunis |
| 13 | RW | Mohamed Ali Bhar | 17 September 1989 (aged 26) | 1.80 m | | | (Tunisia) Espérance Tunis |
| 15 | LB | Khaled Haj Youssef | 12 January 1989 (aged 27) | 1.89 m | | | (Tunisia) Club Africain |
| 17 | LB | Wael Jallouz | 3 May 1991 (aged 24) | 1.97 m | | | (Spain) FC Barcelona |
| 18 | CB | Mohamed Soussi | 17 January 1993 (aged 23) | 1.94 m | | | (Tunisia) Club Africain |
| 19 | LB | Mosbah Sanaï | 26 March 1991 (aged 24) | 1.92 m | | | (Qatar) El Jaish SC |
| 21 | LW | Oussama Boughanmi | 5 February 1990 (aged 25) | 1.85 m | | | (Tunisia) Espérance Tunis |
| 22 | CB | Sobhi Saïed | 26 September 1982 (aged 33) | 1.86 m | | | (Qatar) Al Sadd |
| 25 | LW | Oussama Hosni | 17 September 1992 (aged 23) | 1.92 m | | | (Tunisia) Club Africain |
| 31 | P | Marouan Chouiref | 27 May 1990 (aged 25) | 1.97 m | | | (Tunisia) Espérance Tunis |
| 33 | CB | Seifeddine Hmida | 1 January 1991 (aged 25) | 1.93 m | | | (Tunisia) Étoile du Sahel |
| 77 | RB | Nidhal Amri | 26 January 1990 (aged 26) | 1.90 m | | | (Saudi Arabia) Al-Ahli Jeddah |
| ? | GK | Mohamed Sfar | 4 January 1990 (aged 26) | 1.94 m | | | (Tunisia) Club Africain |
| ? | P | Ryadh Souid | 10 September 1987 (aged 28) | 1.94 m | | | (France) Amiens Handball |
