= Handball at the 2019 African Games =

African Games event

- Venue: Mohammed V Sports Complex; Sports Center Ibrahim Zahare
- Location: Casablanca, Morocco
- Dates: 20–29 August
- Nations: 13

Handball at the 2019 African Games was held from 20 to 29 August 2019 in Casablanca, Morocco.

== Participants ==
Nine men's and ten women's teams qualified for the games, including the host country, Morocco.

=== Men ===
Group A	Group B
Egypt; Algeria; Morocco; Zambia	Comoros; Angola; Burkina Faso; DR Congo; Nigeria

=== Women ===
Group A	Group B
Angola; DR Congo; Guinea; Morocco; Nigeria	Algeria; Cameroon; Kenya; Tunisia; Uganda

== Events ==
=== Schedule ===
P	Preliminaries	¼	Quarterfinals	½	Semifinals	F	Final

Event↓/Date →	Tue 20 Aug	Wed 21 Aug	Thu 22 Aug	Sat 24 Aug	Sun 25 Aug	Mon 26 Aug	Wed 28 Aug	Thu 29 Aug
Men	P	P	P	P	P	¼	½	F
Women	P	P	P	P	P	¼	½	F

=== Medal summary ===
Event	Gold	Silver	Bronze
Men	Angola; Adelino Pestana; Adilson Maneco; Agnelo Quitongo; Albino Cassange; Cláudio Lopes; Cláudio Chicola; Custódio Gouveia; Declerck Sibo; Elsemar Pedro; Feliciano Couveiro; Gabriel Teca; Giovane Muachissengue; Manuel Nascimento; Mário Tati; Otiniel Pascoal; Romé Hebo	Egypt; Abd Aziz Ahab; Abd Elfatah Ali; Abdelrahman Taha; Ahmed Rady; Abdelrahman Mohamed; Kassem Ahmed; Khaled Walid; Omar Dahroug; Omar El-Wakil; Omar Khaled; Mohab Said; Mohsen Ramadan; Ramadan Shady; Saif Hany; Seif El-Deraa; Shehab Ahmed	Morocco; Abderrahim Chouhou; Amine Harchaoui; Belhou Mourad; Hamza Mannane; Hassan Kacheradi; Hicham El Hakimy; Icham Frid; Jamal Ouaali; Mehdi Alaoui; Mohamed Miri; Mohammed Bentaleb; Mohammed Ezzine; Mohammed Zaher; Redwane Braout; Said Malki; Yassine Belhou
Women	Angola; Albertina Kassoma; Azenaide Carlos; Carolina Morais; Claudete José; Helena Paulo; Helena Sousa; Iracelma Silva; Isabel Guialo; Janete Santos; Juliana Machado; Magda Cazanga; Natália Bernardo; Ruth João; Teresa Almeida; Vilma Silva; Wuta Dombaxe	Cameroon; Adjani Nguesseu; Anne Essam; Berthe Abiabakon; Claudia Eyenga; Génie Fedjou; Gisele Nkolo; Jacqueline Mossy; Jacky Baniomo; Jasmine Yotchoum; Liliane Kamga; Marie Balana; Yolande Touba; Marie Tenang; Noelle Mben; Vanessa Djiepmou; Vicky Pokop	DR Congo; Grace Zoubalela; Consolate Feza; Micheline Mukoko; Christianne Mwasesa; Raissa Yalibi; Prescyllia Engala; Diane Louoba; Lydia Kasangala; Rabby Ifaso; Falonne Yabon; Carine Ngombo; Cynthia Liandja; Isaure Mosabau; Grace Shokkos; Francoise Kashala; Roseline Ngo Leyi

== Medal table ==
* Host nation (Morocco)

Rank	Nation	Gold	Silver	Bronze	Total
1	Angola (ANG)	2	0	0	2
2	Cameroon (CMR)	0	1	0	1
2	Egypt (EGY)	0	1	0	1
4	Democratic Republic of the Congo (COD)	0	0	1	1
4	Morocco (MAR)*	0	0	1	1
Totals (5 entries)		2	2	2	6
