= Handball at the 2011 All-Africa Games =

Tournament details
- Host country: Mozambique
- Venues: 2 (in 1 host city)
- Dates: 8 – 17 September
- Teams: 24 (from 1 confederation)

Final positions
- Champions: Egypt (men); Angola (women)
- Runners-up: Angola (men); Congo (women)
- Third place: Algeria (men); Cameroon(women)
- Fourth place: Senegal (men); Algeria(women)

Handball at the 2011 All-Africa Games was held from September 6–16, 2011 at several venues.

== Events ==
=== Schedule ===
P	Preliminaries	¼	Quarterfinals	½	Semifinals	F	Final

Event↓/Date →	Tue 8 Sep	Wed 9 Sep	Thu 10 Sep	Fri 11 Sep	Sun 13 Sep	Mon 14 Sep	Tue 15 Sep	Thu 17 Sep
Men	P	P	P	P	¼		½	F
Women	P	P	P	P		¼	½	F

=== Medal summary ===
Event	Gold	Silver	Bronze
Men	Egypt; Karim Hassan; Ahmed Aboulfet; Mamdouh Tah; Ahmed Nasr; Ibrahim Momed; Mohamed Bakir El-Nakib; Hassan Aly; Hassan Yoursi; Mohamed Abdelsalam; Mohamed Hashem; Eslam Issa; Omar Gamal; Ibrahim Masry	Angola; Custódio Gouveia; Yuri Fernandes; Elsemar Pedro; Elias António; Osvaldo Mulenessa; Belchior Camuanga; Adelino Pestana; Edvaldo Ferreira; Romé Hebo; Fernando Teca; Giovane Muachissengue; Sérgio Lopes; Augusto Pedro; António Costa	Algeria; Abdelkader Senouci; Adel Bousmal; Samir Kerbouche; Omar Chehbour; Hamza Zouaoui; Salah Eddine Cheikh; Hichem Daoud; Ryad Djermouli; Hamza Feradj; Riadh Chehbour; Hichem Aillane; Tarek Boukhmis; Messaoud Berkous; Abderrahim Berriah; Hichem Kaabeche; Messaoud Layadi
Women	Angola; Odeth Tavares; Maria Pedro; Joelma Viegas; Bombo Calandula; Carolina Morais; Nair Almeida; Isabel Guialo; Isabel Fernandes; Luísa Kiala; Matilde André; Natália Bernardo; Azenaide Carlos; Acilene Sebastião; Marcelina Kiala; Elzira Barros; Neyde Barbosa	Congo; Virginie Patricia Yende; Lucie Okanatha; Raissa Yalibi; Ngouokou Mpinoba; Herdia Marlisse Delpoko; Chantal Okomba; Yoma Viya Eyoma; Suzanne Bellette Mambou; Sanrelle Itoua; Prisca Natacha Monka; Tsahout Mavoungou; Ikombo Nianga; Porcia Essopondo; Mircille Tchikaya; Jo Verany Moukassa; Kougnanganga Okandotou	Cameroon; Honoree Ngo Batandi; Berthe Abiabakon; Gisèle Tsanze Meugoumfeut; Léonie Makamgoum Takam; Evelyne Mbahea Mpongo; Pasma Nchouapouognigni; Amougui-Nathalie Melingui; Hermine Ngo Kaldjop; Louisette Ngeh; Anne Essam...

=== Medal table ===
Rank	Nation	Gold	Silver	Bronze	Total
1	Angola	1	1	0	2
2	Egypt	1	0	0	1
3	Congo	0	1	0	1
4	Algeria	0	0	1	1
4	Cameroon	0	0	1	1
Totals (5 entries)		2	2	2	6

== Final standings ==
Rank	Men			
Rank	Team	Pld	W	L
1st place, gold medalist(s)	Egypt	5	5	0
2nd place, silver medalist(s)	Angola	5	4	1
3rd place, bronze medalist(s)	Algeria	5	3	2
4.	Senegal	5	2	3
Eliminated at the quarterfinals
5.	Nigeria	5	3	2
6.	Cameroon	5	2	3
7.	Congo	5	2	3
8.	Mozambique	5	1	4
Preliminary round 3rd placers
9.	Gabon	4	3	1
10.	Kenya	4	1	3
11.	Madagascar	4	1	3
12.	Ghana	4	0	4

Rank	Women			
Rank	Team	Pld	W	L
1st place, gold medalist(s)	Angola	5	5	0
2nd place, silver medalist(s)	Congo	5	4	1
3rd place, bronze medalist(s)	Cameroon	5	4	1
4.	Algeria	5	2	3
Eliminated at the quarterfinals
5.	Nigeria	5	3	2
6.	DR Congo	5	2	3
7.	Kenya	5	2	3
8.	Cape Verde	5	2	3
Preliminary round 5th placers
9.	Senegal	4	2	2
10.	Ghana	4	1	3
11.	Mozambique	4	1	3
12.	Madagascar	4	0	4
