= Handball at the 2019 African Games – Men's tournament =

Men's handball at the 2019 African Games
Tournament details
- Host country: Morocco
- Venues: 2 (in 1 host city)
- Dates: 20–29 August
- Teams: 9 (from 1 confederation)

Final positions
- Champions: Angola (1st title)
- Runners-up: Egypt
- Third place: Morocco
- Fourth place: Algeria

Tournament statistics
- Matches played: 28

The men's handball tournament at the 2019 African Games was held from 20 to 29 August at the Mohammed V Sports Complex and Sports Center Ibrahim Zahare in Casablanca.

== Group stage ==
All times are local (UTC+1).

=== Group A ===
Pos	Team	Pld	W	D	L	GF	GA	GD	Pts	Qualification
1	Egypt	3	3	0	0	116	72	+44	6	Quarterfinals
2	Morocco (H)	3	2	0	1	115	64	+51	4	Quarterfinals
3	Guinea	3	1	0	2	81	112	−31	2	Quarterfinals
4	Zambia	3	0	0	3	70	134	−64	0	Quarterfinals

Source: AG 2019
Rules for classification: 1) Points; 2) Head-to-head points; 3) Head-to-head goal difference; 4) Head-to-head goals scored; 5) Goal difference; 6) Goals scored; 7) Draw.
(H) Hosts

20 August 2019; 18:00	Morocco	51–14	Zambia	Mohammed V Sports Complex
20 August 2019; 18:00		(27–6)		Mohammed V Sports Complex

21 August 2019; 12:00	Egypt	42–22	Guinea	Mohammed V Sports Complex
21 August 2019; 12:00		(21–8)		Mohammed V Sports Complex

22 August 2019; 18:00	Guinea	18–37	Morocco	Mohammed V Sports Complex
22 August 2019; 18:00		(8–13)		Mohammed V Sports Complex

24 August 2019; 12:00	Zambia	23–42	Egypt	Mohammed V Sports Complex
24 August 2019; 12:00		(12–20)		Mohammed V Sports Complex

25 August 2019; 10:00	Zambia	33–41	Guinea	Mohammed V Sports Complex
25 August 2019; 10:00		10–17		Mohammed V Sports Complex

25 August 2019; 18:00	Egypt	32–27	Morocco	Mohammed V Sports Complex
25 August 2019; 18:00		(17–13)		Mohammed V Sports Complex

=== Group B ===
Pos	Team	Pld	W	D	L	GF	GA	GD	Pts	Qualification
1	Angola	4	3	1	0	109	86	+23	7	Quarterfinals
2	Algeria	4	2	2	0	101	94	+7	6	Quarterfinals
3	DR Congo	4	1	2	1	89	94	−5	4	Quarterfinals
4	Nigeria	4	1	1	2	91	93	−2	3	Quarterfinals
5	Burkina Faso	4	0	0	4	92	115	−23	0	

Source: AG 2019
Rules for classification: 1) Points; 2) Head-to-head points; 3) Head-to-head goal difference; 4) Head-to-head goals scored; 5) Goal difference; 6) Goals scored; 7) Draw.

20 August 2019; 14:00	Algeria	31–26	Burkina Faso	Mohammed V Sports Complex
20 August 2019; 14:00		(13–14)		Mohammed V Sports Complex

21 August 2019; 16:00	Angola	31–20	Nigeria	Mohammed V Sports Complex
21 August 2019; 16:00		(16–12)		Mohammed V Sports Complex

21 August 2019; 14:00	DR Congo	29–28	Burkina Faso	Mohammed V Sports Complex
21 August 2019; 14:00		(16–13)		Mohammed V Sports Complex

21 August 2019; 18:00	Algeria	24–22	Nigeria	Mohammed V Sports Complex
21 August 2019; 18:00		(7–11)		Mohammed V Sports Complex

22 August 2019; 12:00	Burkina Faso	21–27	Angola	Mohammed V Sports Complex
22 August 2019; 12:00		(8–15)		Mohammed V Sports Complex

22 August 2019; 16:00	DR Congo	20–20	Algeria	Mohammed V Sports Complex
22 August 2019; 16:00		(10–11)		Mohammed V Sports Complex

24 August 2019; 14:00	Nigeria	28–17	Burkina Faso	Mohammed V Sports Complex
24 August 2019; 14:00		(17–10)		Mohammed V Sports Complex

24 August 2019; 18:00	Angola	25–19	DR Congo	Mohammed V Sports Complex
24 August 2019; 18:00		(12–10)		Mohammed V Sports Complex

25 August 2019; 14:00	DR Congo	21–21	Nigeria	Mohammed V Sports Complex
25 August 2019; 14:00		(12–10)		Mohammed V Sports Complex

25 August 2019; 16:00	Angola	26–26	Algeria	Mohammed V Sports Complex
25 August 2019; 16:00		(13–10)		Mohammed V Sports Complex

== Knockout stage ==
=== Bracket ===
Quarterfinals
26 August
Egypt	27
Nigeria	26
26 August
Algeria	33
Guinea	18
26 August
Morocco (OT)	26
DR Congo	23
26 August
Zambia	20
Angola	41

Semifinals
28 August
Egypt	40
Algeria	23
28 August
Morocco	24
Angola	27

Final
29 August
Egypt	25
Angola	31
Third place
29 August
Algeria	22
Morocco	25

5–8th place bracket

5–8th place semifinals
28 August
Nigeria	23
Guinea	17
28 August
DR Congo	42
Zambia	20

Fifth place
29 August
Nigeria	18
DR Congo	19
Seventh place
29 August
Guinea	39
Zambia	19

=== Quarterfinals ===
26 August 2019; 12:00	Egypt	27–26	Nigeria	Mohammed V Sports Complex
26 August 2019; 12:00		(9–14)		Mohammed V Sports Complex

26 August 2019; 14:00	Algeria	33–18	Guinea	Mohammed V Sports Complex
26 August 2019; 14:00		(16–8)		Mohammed V Sports Complex

26 August 2019; 16:00	Zambia	20–41	Angola	Mohammed V Sports Complex
26 August 2019; 16:00		(8–20)		Mohammed V Sports Complex

26 August 2019
18:00
Morocco
26–23 (ET)
DR Congo
Mohammed V Sports Complex

(10–9)

FT: 22–22 ET: 4–1

=== 5–8th place semifinals ===
28 August 2019; 16:00	DR Congo	42–20	Zambia	Sports Center Ibrahim Zahare
28 August 2019; 16:00		(22–10)		Sports Center Ibrahim Zahare

28 August 2019; 18:00	Nigeria	23–17	Guinea	Sports Center Ibrahim Zahare
28 August 2019; 18:00		(11–7)		Sports Center Ibrahim Zahare

=== Semifinals ===
28 August 2019; 14:00	Egypt	40–23	Algeria	Mohammed V Sports Complex
28 August 2019; 14:00		(21–12)		Mohammed V Sports Complex

28 August 2019; 19:00	Morocco	24–27	Angola	Mohammed V Sports Complex
28 August 2019; 19:00		(11–14)		Mohammed V Sports Complex

=== Seventh place game ===
29 August 2019; 12:00	Guinea	39–19	Zambia	Sports Center Ibrahim Zahare
29 August 2019; 12:00		(20–5)		Sports Center Ibrahim Zahare

=== Fifth place game ===
29 August 2019; 11:00	Nigeria	18–19	DR Congo	Mohammed V Sports Complex
29 August 2019; 11:00		(8–9)		Mohammed V Sports Complex

=== Third place game ===
29 August 2019; 15:00	Algeria	22–25	Morocco	Mohammed V Sports Complex
29 August 2019; 15:00		(11–12)		Mohammed V Sports Complex

=== Final ===
29 August 2019; 19:00	Egypt	25–31	Angola	Mohammed V Sports Complex
29 August 2019; 19:00		(12–15)		Mohammed V Sports Complex

== Final standing ==
Rank	Team
1st place, gold medalist(s)	Angola
2nd place, silver medalist(s)	Egypt
3rd place, bronze medalist(s)	Morocco
4	Algeria
5	DR Congo
6	Nigeria
7	Guinea
8	Zambia
9	Burkina Faso
