= Belchior Camuanga =

Angolan handball player

Personal information
- Full name: Belchior Nelson Camuanga
- Nationality: Angolan
- Born: 21 August 1983 (age 43)
- Height: 1.70 m (5 ft 7 in)

Sport
- Sport: Handball
- Position: Left back
- Current club: Primeiro de Agosto
National team
Years	Team	Apps	(Gls)
–	Angola	36	(85)

Belchior Nelson Camuanga, nicknamed Show Baby, (born 21 August 1983) is an Angolan handball player for Primeiro de Agosto and the Angolan national team.

He participated at the 2017 World Men's Handball Championship.
