= Ivan Maroz =

Belarusian handball player

Personal information
- Nationality: Belarusian
- Born: 5 October 1992 (age 34) Gomel, Belarus
- Height: 1.97 m (6 ft 6 in)

Sport
- Sport: Handball
- Position: Goalkeeper
- Current club: Bnei Herzliya
- Number: 33

Senior clubs
- Years: Team
- 2011–2016: Gomel
- 2016–2020: SKA Minsk
- 2020–2022: HC Motor Zaporizhzhia
- 2022–: Bnei Herzliya
National team
- Years: Team
- 2016–: Belarus

Ivan Maroz (Belarusian: Іван Мароз; born 5 October 1992) is a Belarusian handball player for Bnei Herzliya and the Belarusian national team.
