= Osvaldo Mulenessa =

Angolan handball player

Personal information
- Full name: Osvaldo Liandro Mulenessa
- Nationality: Angolan
- Born: 3 February 1986 (age 40)
- Height: 1.70 m (5 ft 7 in)

Sport
- Sport: Handball
- Position: Right back
- Current club: Primeiro de Agosto
- Number: 6
National team
Years	Team	Apps	(Gls)
–	Angola	29	(37)
Medal record
African Championship
Bronze medal – third place	Egypt 2016

Osvaldo Liandro Mulenessa, nicknamed Vadinho, (born 3 February 1986) is an Angolan handball player for Primeiro de Agosto and the Angolan national team.

He participated at the 2017 World Men's Handball Championship.
