= Benjamin Jakobsen =

Danish handball player (born 1991)

Personal information
- Nationality: Danish
- Born: 9 September 1991 (age 35) Hamburg, Germany
- Height: 1.91 m (6 ft 3 in)

Sport
- Sport: Handball
- Position: Pivot
- Current club: Aalborg Håndbold
- Number: 27

Senior clubs
- Years: Team
- 2009–2012: Skanderborg Håndbold
- 2012–2014: Bjerringbro-Silkeborg Håndbold
- 2018–2019: Skjern Håndbold
- 2019–2023: Aalborg Håndbold
- 2023: Sporting CP
- 2024–: Aalborg Håndbold
National team
Years	Team	Apps	(Gls)
2013–	Denmark	3	(1)
Medal record
World Championship
Gold medal – first place	2021 Egypt

Benjamin Jakobsen (born 9 September 1991) is a Danish handball player for Sporting CP and the Danish national team.

He represented Denmark at the 2021 World Men's Handball Championship, where Denmark won gold medals for the second time. He did however not play the entire tournament, and was replaced by Magnus Bramming.

In 2014 he retired temporarily, but in 2018 he returned to the handball field. In 2019 he joined Aalborg Håndbold.
