= Berthe Abiabakon =

Cameroonian handball player

Personal information
- Full name: Berthe Abiabakon Onoukou
- Nationality: Cameroonian
- Born: 7 October 1988 (age 38)
- Height: 1.75 m (5 ft 9 in)

Sport
- Sport: Handball
- Position: Goalkeeper
- Current club: La Roche-sur-Yon
National team
Years	Team	Apps
–	Cameroon	38
Medal record
African Championship
Silver medal – second place	2021 Yaoundé
Silver medal – second place	2022 Dakar

Berthe Abiabakon Onoukou (born 7 October 1988) is a Cameroonian handball player for La Roche-sur-Yon and the Cameroonian national team.

She participated at the 2017 World Women's Handball Championship. At the 2021 and 2022 African Championship she won silver medals, losing to Angola in the final on both occasions.
