= Cláudio Chicola =

Angolan handball player

Claúdio Chicola
Personal information
- Nationality: Angolan
- Born: 25 September 1999 (age 27)
- Height: 1.90 m (6 ft 3 in)

Sport
- Sport: Handball
- Position: Left wing
- Current club: G.D. Interclube
National team
Years	Team	Apps	(Gls)
2019–	Angola	7	(5)

Claúdio André Patrício Chicola (born 25 September 1999) is an Angolan handball player for G.D. Interclube and the Angolan national team.

He represented Angola at the 2019 World Men's Handball Championship.
