= Otiniel Pascoal =

Angolan handball player

Personal information
- Nationality: Angolan
- Born: 21 February 1995 (age 31)
- Height: 1.79 m (5 ft 10 in)

Sport
- Sport: Handball
- Position: Left wing
- Current club: Primeiro de Agosto
- Number: 8
National team
Years	Team	Apps	(Gls)
–	Angola	46	(51)

Otiniel Pascoal (born 21 February 1995) is an Angolan handball player for Primeiro de Agosto and the Angolan national team.

He represented Angola at the 2019 World Men's Handball Championship.
