= Abdellah Benmenni =

Algerian handball player (born 1986)

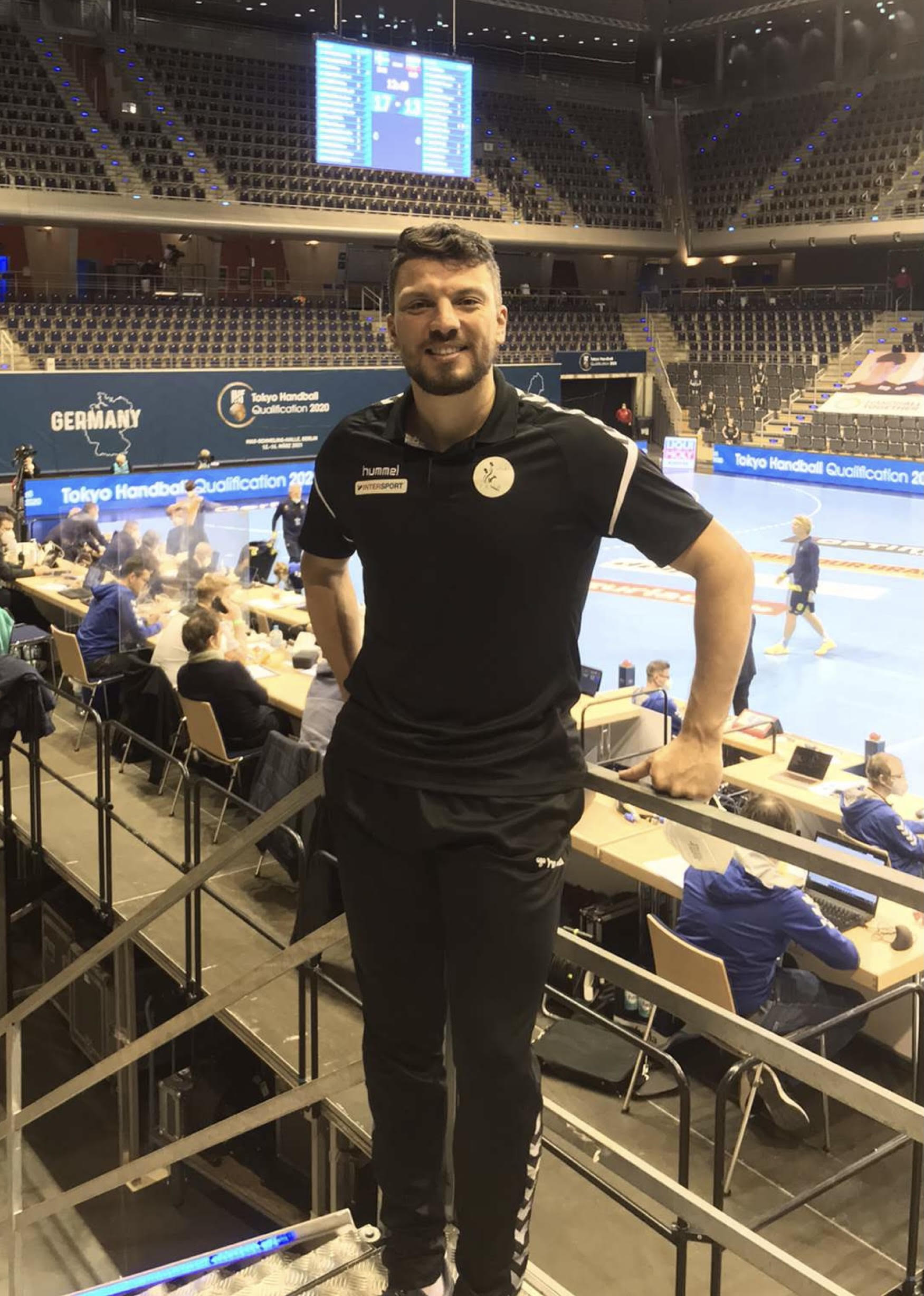

Personal information
- Nationality: Algerian
- Born: 19 August 1986 (age 40)
- Height: 1.94 m (6 ft 4 in)

Sport
- Sport: Handball
- Position: Goalkeeper
- Current club: GS Pétroliers

Senior clubs
- Years: Team
- –: GS Pétroliers
National team
Years	Team	Apps	(Gls)
2014-	Algeria	35	(0)

Abdellah Benmenni (born 19 August 1986) is an Algerian handball goalkeeper for Mouloudia Club d'Alger GS Pétroliers.

He currently plays for the Algerian national team, and has represented Algeria in several international championships, including the 2013 World Championships in Spain, the 2015 World Men's Handball Championship in Qatar and the 2021 IHF World Men's Handball Championship in Cairo.
