= Elsemar Pedro =

Angolan handball player

Personal information
- Nationality: Angolan
- Born: 4 April 1990 (age 36)
- Height: 1.80 m (5 ft 11 in)

Sport
- Sport: Handball
- Position: Right wing
- Current club: Primeiro de Agosto
- Number: 19
National team
Years	Team	Apps	(Gls)
–	Angola	46	(35)

Elsemar Pedro (born 4 April 1990) is an Angolan handball player for Primeiro de Agosto and the Angolan national team.

He represented Angola at the 2019 World Men's Handball Championship.
