= Karim Handawy =

Egyptian handball player (born 1988)

Karim Hendawy
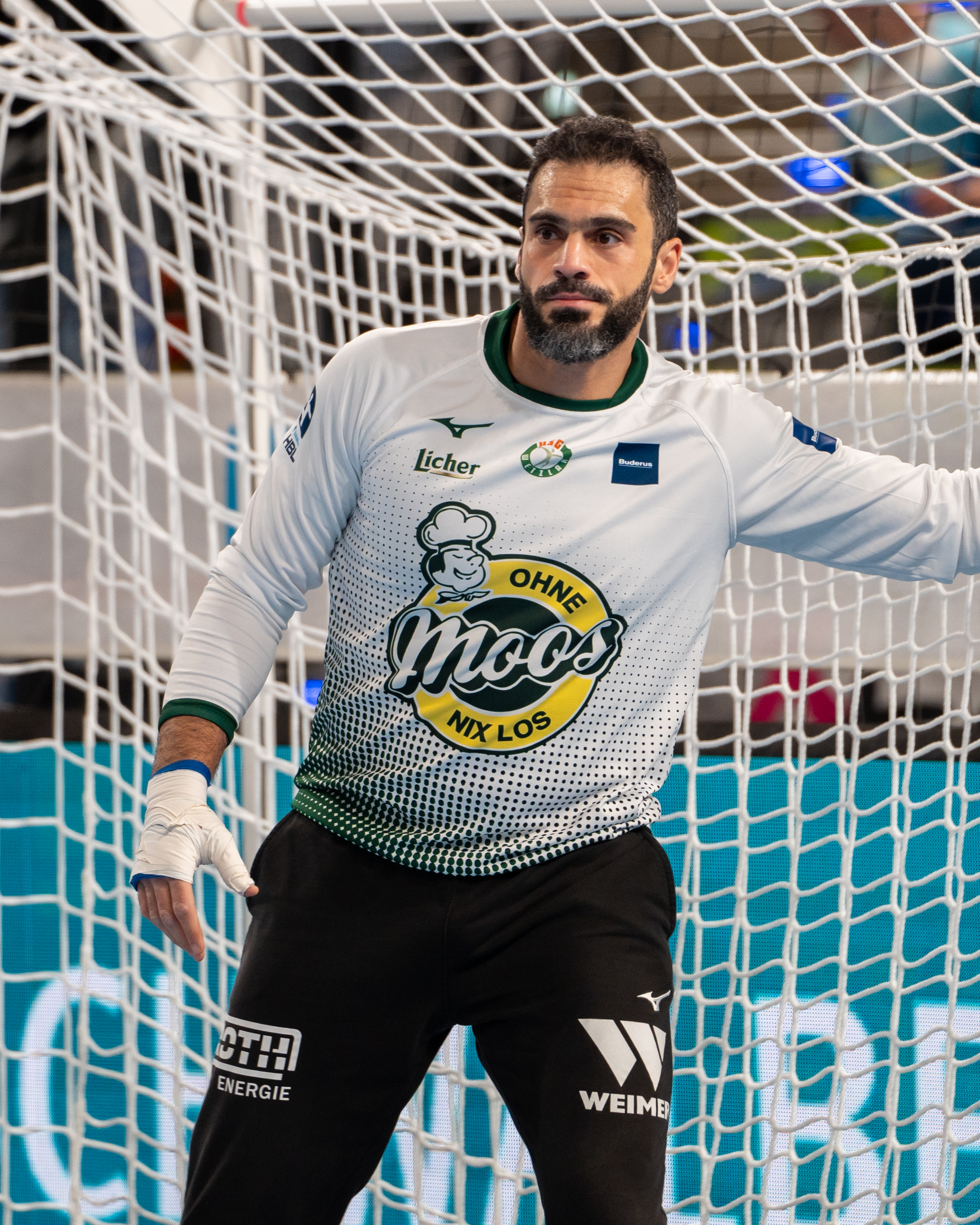
- Hendawy in 2025

Personal information
- Nationality: Egyptian
- Born: 11 May 1988 (age 38) Cairo, Egypt
- Height: 1.88 m (6 ft 2 in)

Sport
- Sport: Handball
- Position: Goalkeeper
- Current club: Al Safa Club
- Number: 66
National team
- Years: Team
- –: Egypt
Medal record
African Championship
Gold medal – first place	2016 Egypt
Gold medal – first place	2020 Tunisia
Gold medal – first place	2022 Egypt
Gold medal – first place	2024 Egypt
Mediterranean Games
Gold medal – first place	2013 Mersin	Team
Silver medal – second place	2022 Oran	Team

Karim Hendawy (Arabic: كريم هنداوي; born 1 May 1988) is an Egyptian handball player for Saudi Arabian Al Safa Club and the Egyptian national team.

He represented Egypt at the World Men's Handball Championship in 2015, 2017, 2019, 2021, and 2023 and in the 2020 and 2016 Summer Olympics.
