= Edvaldo Ferreira =

Angolan handball player

Personal information
- Full name: Edvaldo Esmael Ferreira
- Nationality: Angolan
- Born: 28 May 1990 (age 36)
- Height: 2.00 m (6 ft 7 in)

Sport
- Sport: Handball
- Position: Right back
- Current club: Smouha Club Alexandria
National team
Years	Team	Apps	(Gls)
2010-	Angola	80	(330)
Medal record
African Championship
Bronze medal – third place	Egypt 2016
Bronze medal – third place	Gabon 2018

Edvaldo Esmael Ferreira (born 28 May 1990) is an Angolan handball player for Smouha Club Alexandria and the Angolan national team.

He participated at the 2017 World Men's Handball Championship.
