= Gabriel Teca =

Angolan handball player

Personal information
- Full name: Gabriel Massuca Teca
- Nationality: Angolan
- Born: 2 February 1991 (age 35)
- Height: 1.92 m (6 ft 4 in)

Sport
- Sport: Handball
- Position: Pivot
- Current club: CSM Sighisoara (handball)
- Number: 4
National team
| Years | Team | Apps | (Gls) |
| – | Angola | 38 | (47) |
Medal record
African Championship
| Bronze medal – third place | Egypt 2016 |

Gabriel Massuca Teca (born 2 February 1991) is an Angolan handball player for Primeiro de Agosto and the Angolan national team.

He participated at the 2017 World Men's Handball Championship.
