= Agnelo Quitongo =

Angolan handball player

Personal information
- Nationality: Angolan
- Born: 22 November 1991 (age 34)
- Height: 1.88 m (6 ft 2 in)

Sport
- Sport: Handball
- Position: Pivot
- Current club: Primeiro de Agosto
National team
Years	Team	Apps	(Gls)
–	Angola	12	(6)

Agnelo Quitongo (born 22 November 1991) is an Angolan handball player for Primeiro de Agosto and the Angolan national team.

He represented Angola at the 2019 World Men's Handball Championship.
