= Manuel Nascimento =

Angolan handball player

Personal information
- Full name: Manuel António Nascimento
- Nationality: Angolan
- Born: 15 March 1994 (age 32)
- Height: 1.83 m (6 ft 0 in)

Sport
- Sport: Handball
- Position: Centre back
- Current club: Primeiro de Agosto
- Number: 6
National team
Years	Team	Apps	(Gls)
–	Angola	45	(98)
Medal record
African Championship
Bronze medal – third place	Egypt 2016

Manuel António Nascimento (born 15 March 1994) is an Angolan handball player for Primeiro de Agosto and the Angolan national team.

He participated at the 2017 and 2019 World Championships.
