= Hichem Daoud =

Algerian handball player (born 1992)

Personal information
- Nationality: Algerian
- Born: 9 January 1992 (age 34) Tissemsilt, Algeria
- Height: 1.90 m (6 ft 3 in)

Sport
- Sport: Handball
- Position: Left wing
- Current club: Billère HB
- Number: 23

Youth career
- Years: Team
- 2009-2011: HBC El-Biar

Senior clubs
- Years: Team
- 2011-2014: (Algeria) HBC El-Biar
- 2014-2016: (Algeria) CRB Baraki
- 2016-2021: (France) Istres Provence Handball
- 2021-2023: (France) Limoges Handball
- 2023-: (France) Billère HB
National team
| Years | Team | Apps | (Gls) |
| 2011- | Algeria | 129 | (230) |
Medal record
African Championship
| Silver medal – second place | 2012 Morocco |
| Silver medal – second place | 2024 Egypt |
| Bronze medal – third place | 2020 Tunisia |

Hichem Daoud (born 9 January 1992) is an Algerian handball player for French team Billère HB.

He competed for the Algerian national team at the 2015 World Men's Handball Championship in Qatar.

He also participated at the 2011 and 2013 World Championships.
