= Cláudio Lopes =

Angolan handball player

Personal information
- Nationality: Angolan
- Born: 28 February 1992 (age 34)
- Height: 1.77 m (5 ft 10 in)

Sport
- Sport: Handball
- Position: Centre back
- Current club: Primeiro de Agosto
- Number: 14
National team
Years	Team	Apps	(Gls)
2019–	Angola	7	(8)

Cláudio Lopes (born 28 February 1992) is an Angolan handball player for Primeiro de Agosto and the Angolan national team.

He represented Angola at the 2019 World Men's Handball Championship.
