= Abderrahim Berriah =

Algerian handball player (born 1988)

Personal information
- Nationality: Algerian
- Born: 10 January 1988 (age 38) Saïda, Algeria
- Height: 1.90 m (6 ft 3 in)

Sport
- Sport: Handball
- Position: Right back
- Current club: Retired
National team
Years	Team	Apps	(Gls)
2008-2021	Algeria	120	(280)
Medal record
African Championship
Gold medal – first place	2014 Algeria
Bronze medal – third place	2008 Angola
Bronze medal – third place	2010 Egypt
Bronze medal – third place	2020 Tunisia

Abderrahim Berriah (born 10 January 1988) is an Algerian former professional handball player. He retired in 2023 while playing for Tremblay-en-France Handball.

He competed for the Algerian national team at the 2015 World Men's Handball Championship in Qatar.

He also participated at the 2009, 2011 and 2013 World Championships.
