= Adilson Maneco =

Angolan handball player

Personal information
- Full name: Adilson Bruno Maneco
- Nationality: Angolan
- Born: 2 March 1993 (age 33)
- Height: 1.70 m (5 ft 7 in)

Sport
- Sport: Handball
- Position: Centre back
- Current club: Primeiro de Agosto
- Number: 9
National team
Years	Team	Apps	(Gls)
–	Angola	45	(53)
Medal record
African Championship
Bronze medal – third place	Egypt 2016

Adilson Bruno Maneco (born 2 March 1993) is an Angolan handball player for Primeiro de Agosto and the Angolan national team.

He participated at the 2017 World Men's Handball Championship.
