= Custódio Gouveia =

Angolan handball player

Personal information
- Nationality: Angolan
- Born: 27 July 1985 (age 41)
- Height: 1.91 m (6 ft 3 in)

Sport
- Sport: Handball
- Position: Goalkeeper
- Current club: Inter Clube Angola
- Number: 12
National team
Years	Team	Apps	(Gls)
2019–	Angola	7	(0)

Custódio Gouveia (born 27 July 1985) is an Angolan handball player for Inter Clube Angola and the Angolan national team.

He represented Angola at the 2019 World Men's Handball Championship.
