= Adelino Pestana =

Angolan handball player

Personal information
- Full name: Adelino Anderson Pestana
- Nationality: Angolan
- Born: 11 March 1992 (age 34)
- Height: 1.86 m (6 ft 1 in)

Sport
- Sport: Handball
- Position: Right wing
- Current club: Interclube
- Number: 21
National team
Years	Team	Apps	(Gls)
–	Angola	56	(154)
Medal record
African Championship
Bronze medal – third place	Egypt 2016

Adelino Anderson Pestana (born 1 March 1992) is an Angolan handball player for Interclube and the Angolan national team.

He participated at the 2017 World Men's Handball Championship.
