= Giovane Muachissengue =

Angolan handball player

Personal information
- Full name: Giovane Ranel Muachissengue
- Nationality: Angolan
- Born: 20 February 1984 (age 42)
- Height: 1.88 m (6 ft 2 in)

Sport
- Sport: Handball
- Position: Goalkeeper
- Current club: Primeiro de Agosto
- Number: 20
National team
Years	Team	Apps	(Gls)
–	Angola	60	(1)
Medal record
African Championship
Bronze medal – third place	Egypt 2016

Giovane Ranel Muachissengue (born 20 February 1984) is an Angolan handball player for Primeiro de Agosto and the Angolan national team.

He participated at the 2017 World Men's Handball Championship.
