= Romé Hebo =

Angolan handball player

Personal information
- Full name: Romé António Hebo
- Nationality: Angolan
- Born: 11 April 1992 (age 34)
- Height: 1.92 m (6 ft 4 in)

Sport
- Sport: Handball
- Position: Centre back
National team
Years	Team	Apps	(Gls)
–	Angola	61	(118)
Medal record
African Championship
Bronze medal – third place	Egypt 2016

Romé António Hebo (born 11 April 1992) is an Angolan professional handball player for Dinamo București and the Angolan national team.
