= Angola men's national handball team =

Angola

Information
- Association: Federação Angolana de Andebol
- Coach: Filipe Cruz
- Assistant coach: Edgar Neto

Colours
| 1st | 2nd |

Results

World Championship
- Appearances: 5 (First in 2005)
- Best result: 20th (2005)

African Championship
- Appearances: 20 (First in 1981)
- Best result: (bronze) 3rd (2004, 2016, 2018)
- Last updated on Unknown.

The Angola national handball team are the national handball team of Angola.

== Results ==
=== World Championship ===
| Year | Round | Position | GP | W | D* | L | GS | GA | GD |
|---|---|---|---|---|---|---|---|---|---|
| Tunisia 2005 | Preliminary round | 20th | 5 | 1 | 0 | 4 | 108 | 178 | −70 |
| Germany 2007 | President's Cup | 21st | 6 | 2 | 0 | 4 | 154 | 201 | −47 |
| France 2017 | President's Cup | 24th | 7 | 0 | 0 | 7 | 174 | 260 | −86 |
| Germany/Denmark 2019 | President's Cup | 23rd | 7 | 2 | 0 | 5 | 182 | 223 | −41 |
| Egypt 2021 | President's Cup | 30th | 7 | 1 | 1 | 5 | 173 | 184 | −11 |
| Poland/Sweden 2023 | did not qualify | | | | | | | | |
| Croatia/Denmark/Norway 2025 | did not qualify | | | | | | | | |
| Germany 2027 | Qualified | | | | | | | | |
| France/Germany 2029 | TBD | | | | | | | | |
| Denmark/Iceland/Norway 2031 | TBD | | | | | | | | |
| Total | 6/10 | 0 Titles | 32 | 6 | 1 | 25 | 791 | 1046 | −255 |

*Denotes draws include knockout matches decided in a penalty shootout.

=== African Championship ===
| Year | Position | Year | Position | Year | Position |
|---|---|---|---|---|---|
| Tunisia 1974 | did not compete | Benin 1996 | did not compete | Gabon 2018 | 3rd place |
| Algeria 1976 | did not compete | South Africa 1998 | 8th place | Tunisia 2020 | 4th place |
| Republic of the Congo 1979 | 9th place | Algeria 2000 | did not compete | Egypt 2022 | 8th place |
| Tunisia 1981 | 5th place | Morocco 2002 | 6th place | Egypt 2024 | 8th place |
| Egypt 1983 | 5th place | Egypt 2004 | 3rd place | Rwanda 2026 | 5th place |
| Tunisia 1985 | 5th place | Tunisia 2006 | 4th place | | |
| Morocco 1987 | 5th place | Angola 2008 | 4th place | | |
| Algeria 1989 | 7th place | Egypt 2010 | 5th place | | |
| Egypt 1991 | did not compete | Morocco 2012 | 6th place | | |
| Algeria 1992 | did not compete | Algeria 2014 | 4th place | | |
| Tunisia 1994 | did not compete | Egypt 2016 | 3rd place | | |

- Red border color indicates tournament was held on home :soil.

== Current squad ==
Squad for the 2021 World Men's Handball Championship.

Head coach: José Adelino

| No. | Pos. | Name | Date of birth (age) | Height | App. | Goals | Club |
|---|---|---|---|---|---|---|---|
| 2 | P | Agnelo Quitongo | 22 November 1991 (age 34) | 1.88 m | 12 | 4 | (Angola) Primeiro de Agosto |
| 3 | P | Jaroslav Aguiar | 11 June 1985 (age 41) | 1.90 m | 12 | 8 | (Angola) G.D. Interclube |
| 4 | P | Gabriel Teca | 2 February 1991 (age 35) | 1.92 m | 43 | 34 | (Angola) Primeiro de Agosto |
| 5 | CB | Romé Hebo | 11 April 1992 (age 34) | 1.92 m | 69 | 107 | (Romania) CS Dinamo București |
| 7 | CB | Cláudio Lopes | 28 February 1992 (age 34) | 1.77 m | 10 | 6 | (Angola) G.D. Interclube |
| 8 | LW | Otiniel Pascoal | 21 February 1995 (age 31) | 1.72 m | 12 | 8 | (Angola) Primeiro de Agosto |
| 9 | LW | Adilson Maneco | 2 March 1993 (age 33) | 1.74 m | 51 | 50 | (Angola) Primeiro de Agosto |
| 10 | CB | Manuel Nascimento | 15 March 1994 (age 32) | 1.83 m | 11 | 15 | (Angola) Primeiro de Agosto |
| 11 | RB | Feliciano Couveiro | 22 December 1999 (age 26) | 1.92 m | 2 | 0 | (Angola) Primeiro de Agosto |
| 12 | GK | Ariel Silva | 2 December 1998 (age 27) | 1.82 m | 0 | 0 | (Angola) G.D. Interclube |
| 13 | LB | Mário Tati | 25 August 1988 (age 37) | 1.90 m | 18 | 5 | (Angola) G.D. Interclube |
| 14 | LW | Cláudio Chicola | 25 September 1999 (age 26) | 1.90 m | 10 | 4 | (Angola) G.D. Interclube |
| 15 | LW | Mayomona Panzo | 14 October 1994 (age 31) | 1.78 m | 0 | 0 | (Angola) G.D. Interclube |
| 16 | GK | Giovane Muachissengue | 20 February 1984 (age 42) | 1.88 m | 72 | 1 | (Angola) Primeiro de Agosto |
| 17 | RB | Edgar Abreu | 8 October 1992 (age 33) | 1.88 m | 0 | 0 | (Angola) G.D. Interclube |
| 19 | LW | Ruben José | 1 July 2002 (age 24) | 1.87 m | 0 | 0 | (Angola) G.D. Interclube |
| 20 | GK | Custódio Gouveia | 27 July 1985 (age 41) | 1.91 m | 10 | 0 | (Angola) G.D. Interclube |
| 21 | RB | Adelino Pestana | 11 March 1992 (age 34) | 1.86 m | 61 | 133 | (Angola) G.D. Interclube |
| 22 | CB | Elias Antonio | 30 May 1987 (age 39) | 1.77 m | 12 | 6 | (Portugal) Atlético Clube da Madeira |
| 79 | LB | Edvaldo Ferreira | 28 May 1990 (age 36) | 2.00 m | 39 | 143 | (Angola) G.D. Interclube |
