= El Menzah Sports Palace =

Sports hall in El Menzah, Tunisia

- Cupola of El Menzah
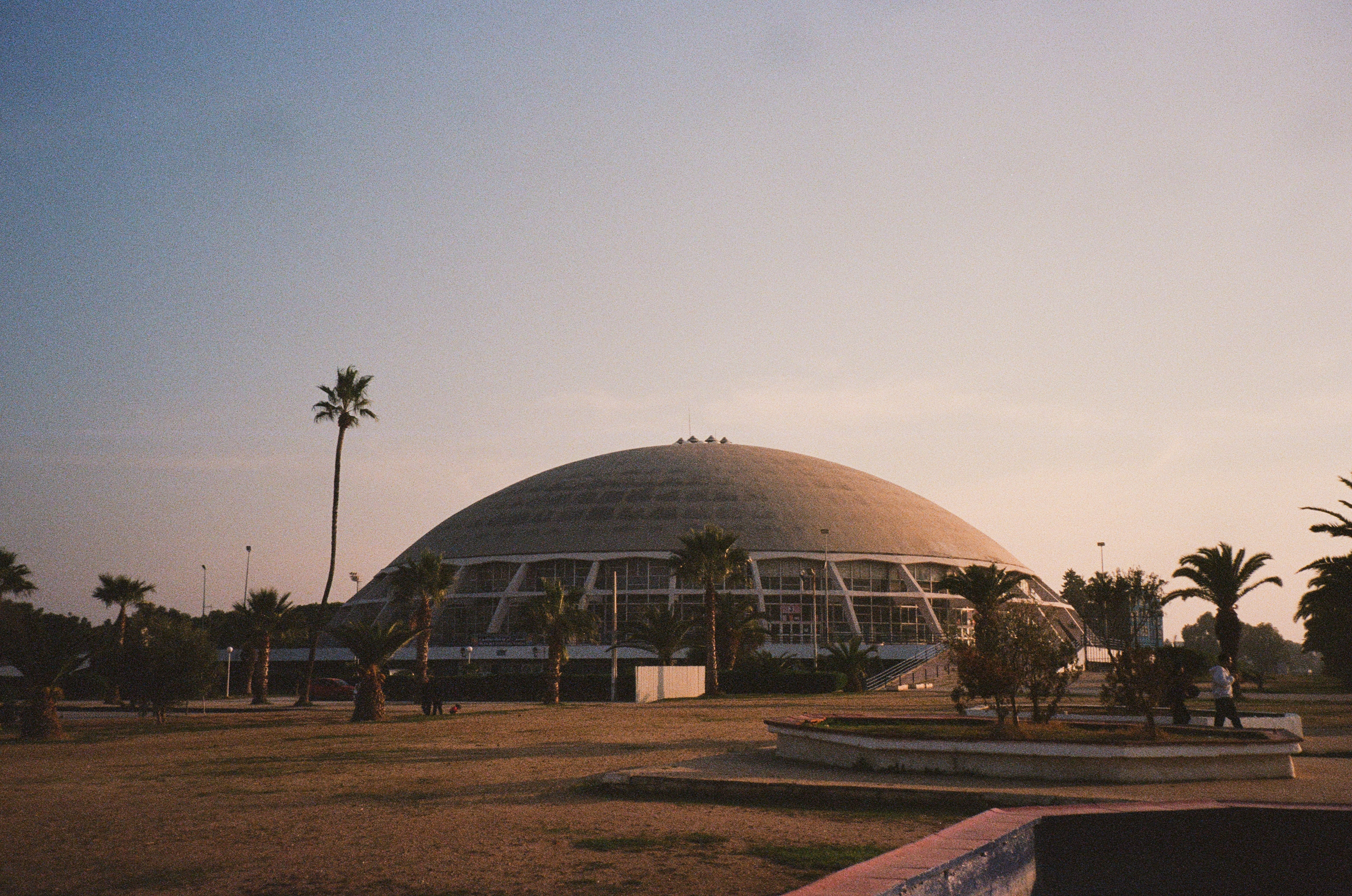
- El Menzah Sports Palace in 2025.
- Interactive map of El Menzah Sports Palace
- Location: El Menzah, Tunis, Tunisia
- Coordinates: 36°50′10″N 10°10′58″E
- Capacity: 5,500 (2005)

Construction
- Opened: 1967; 59 years ago
- Architect: Olivier-Clément Cacoub

Tenant
- Tunisia men's national volleyball team

El Menzah Sport Palace is an indoor sports arena situated in El Menzah, Tunis, Tunisia. It is located in the Olympic City of El Menzah, near the El Menzah Stadium and El Menzah Olympic Swimming Pool.

Its capacity is 5,500 spectators, it was built for the 1967 Mediterranean Games.

== History ==
Built on the occasion of the 1967 Mediterranean Games opened by president Habib Bourguiba, the arena was used primarily for the volleyball competition. The architect for the structure was Olivier-Clément Cacoub.

The 5,500-seat enclosure hosted matches of the 2005 World Men's Handball Championship as well as those of the African handball nations championships in 1974, 1981, 1994, 2006.

Today, the arena usually hosts volleyball, basketball, handball, judo, fencing, wrestling tournaments.

== Events ==
The arena hosted many events and competitions:

- IHF World Men's Handball Championship: 2005
- Men's African Nations Volleyball Championship: 1967, 1976, 1987, 1995, 2019, 2026
- Mediterranean Games: 1967, 2001
- FIE Fencing World Cup: 2009–10
- FIBA Under-19 Women's Basketball World Cup: 2005
- FIBA Africa Championship: 1987
- African Men's Handball Championship: 1974, 1981, 1994, 2006

== See also ==
- El Menzah Stadium
- El Menzah Olympic Swimming Pool
- List of indoor arenas in Tunisia
