= El Menzah Olympic Swimming Pool =

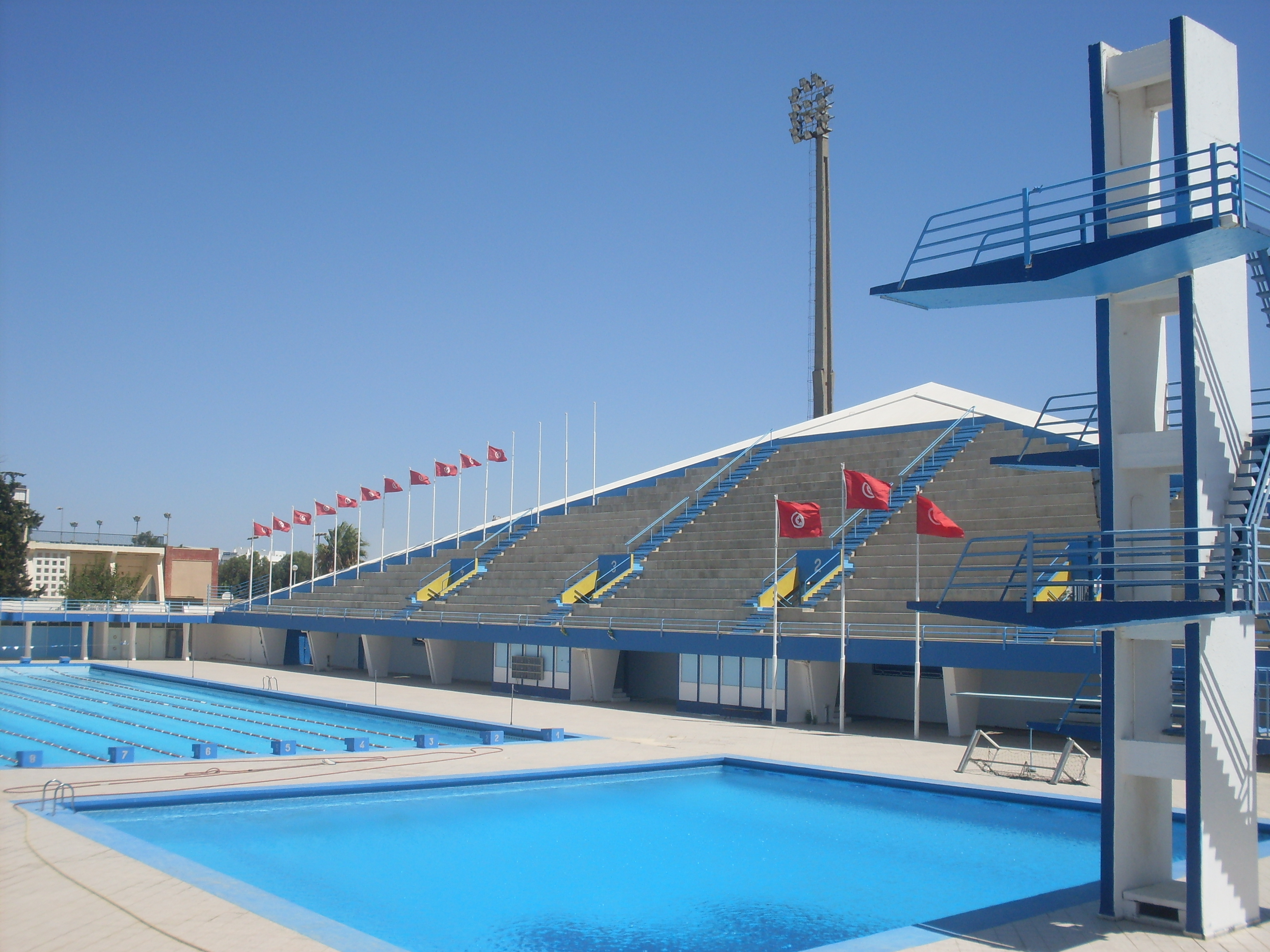
- El Menzah Swimming Pool in 2010.
- Interactive map of El Menzah Olympic Swimming Pool
- Location: El Menzah, Tunis, Tunisia
- Designer: Olivier-Clément Cacoub
- Type: Swimming pool
- Beginning date: 1964
- Completion date: 1967
- Opening date: 1967

The El Menzah Olympic Swimming Pool is an Olympic swimming pool located in El Menzah, Tunis, Tunisia. It is located in the Olympic City of El Menzah, near the El Menzah Stadium and El Menzah Sports Palace.

The pool was build for the 1967 Mediterranean Games.

== History ==
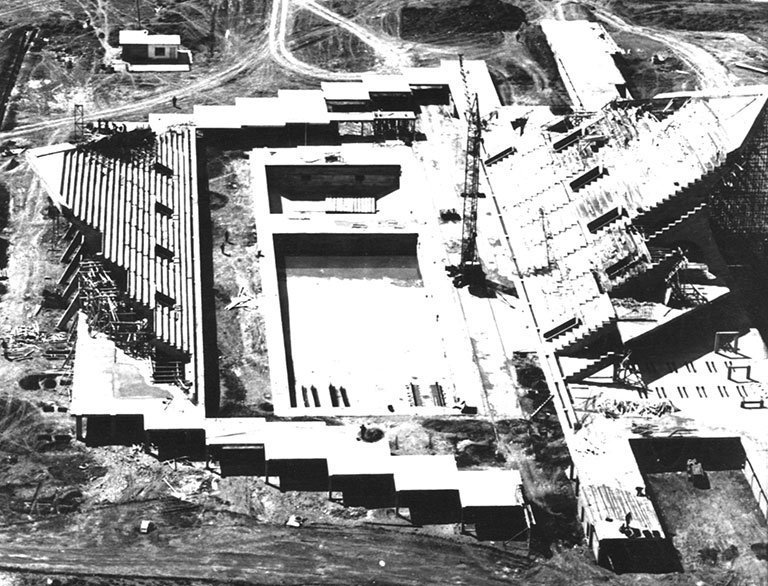
El Menzah Swimming Pool during construction.

The building was built for the 1967 Mediterranean Games held in Tunis, together with other sports facilities, such as El Menzah Stadium and El Menzah Sports Palace, which were part of the Olympic citadel.

== Structure ==
The facility consists of an outdoor and indoor section. The outdoor section features two uncovered triangular pools, complete with side stands for spectators.

The larger pool, measuring 50x20 meters, is used for swimming and water polo, while the smaller one is reserved for diving and features a diving tower and diving boards. The indoor section, on the other hand, contains two 25-meter pools and an adjacent smaller and deeper pool.

== See also ==
- El Menzah Stadium
- El Menzah Sports Palace
