= Handball at the 2023 African Games – Men's tournament =

Men's handball at the 2023 African Games

Tournament details
- Host country: Ghana
- Venue: 1 (in 1 host city)
- Dates: 13–22 March 2024
- Teams: 8 (from 1 confederation)

Final positions
- Champions: Egypt (8th title)
- Runners-up: DR Congo
- Third place: Nigeria
- Fourth place: Benin

Tournament statistics
- Matches played: 18
- Goals scored: 1,072 (59.56 per match)

The men's handball tournament at the 2023 African Games was held from 13 to 22 March 2024 at the Borteyman Sports Complex in Accra.

== Draw ==
The draw was held on 24 February 2024 at the Borteyman Sports Complex in Accra.

Pot 1	Pot 2	Pot 3	Pot 4
Egypt; DR Congo	Nigeria; Kenya	Benin; Mali	Togo; Ghana

== Group stage ==
All times are local (UTC±0).

=== Group A ===
Pos	Team	Pld	W	D	L	GF	GA	GD	Pts	Qualification
1	Egypt	3	3	0	0	130	62	+68	6	Semifinals
2	Nigeria	3	2	0	1	92	64	+28	4	Semifinals
3	Mali	3	1	0	2	65	104	−39	2	Fifth place game
4	Togo	3	0	0	3	66	123	−57	0	Seventh place game

Rules for classification: 1) Points; 2) Head-to-head points; 3) Head-to-head goal difference; 4) Head-to-head goals scored; 5) Goal difference; 6) Goals scored; 7) Draw.

13 March 2024; 12:00	Egypt	49–16	Mali	Borteyman Sports Complex
13 March 2024; 12:00		(23–7)		Borteyman Sports Complex

13 March 2024; 16:00	Nigeria	38–19	Togo	Borteyman Sports Complex
13 March 2024; 16:00		(20–7)		Borteyman Sports Complex

15 March 2024; 12:00	Togo	22–54	Egypt	Borteyman Sports Complex

15 March 2024; 18:00	Mali	18–30	Nigeria	Borteyman Sports Complex

17 March 2024; 14:00	Mali	31–25	Togo	Borteyman Sports Complex

17 March 2024; 16:00	Egypt	27–24	Nigeria	Borteyman Sports Complex

=== Group B ===
Pos	Team	Pld	W	D	L	GF	GA	GD	Pts	Qualification
1	DR Congo	3	3	0	0	115	83	+32	6	Semifinals
2	Benin	3	2	0	1	87	87	0	4	Semifinals
3	Kenya	3	1	0	2	83	94	−11	2	Fifth place game
4	Ghana (H)	3	0	0	3	68	89	−21	0	Seventh place game

Rules for classification: 1) Points; 2) Head-to-head points; 3) Head-to-head goal difference; 4) Head-to-head goals scored; 5) Goal difference; 6) Goals scored; 7) Draw.
(H) Hosts

13 March 2024; 14:00	DR Congo	37–31	Benin	Borteyman Sports Complex
13 March 2024; 14:00		(17–15)		Borteyman Sports Complex

13 March 2024; 18:00	Kenya	27–22	Ghana	Borteyman Sports Complex
13 March 2024; 18:00		(12–11)		Borteyman Sports Complex

15 March 2024; 14:00	Ghana	21–33	DR Congo	Borteyman Sports Complex

15 March 2024; 16:00	Benin	27–25	Kenya	Borteyman Sports Complex

17 March 2024; 12:00	Benin	29–25	Ghana	Borteyman Sports Complex

17 March 2024; 18:00	DR Congo	45–31	Kenya	Borteyman Sports Complex

== Knockout stage ==
=== Bracket ===
Semifinals
20 March
Egypt	38
Benin	27
20 March
DR Congo	29
Nigeria	20

Final
22 March
Egypt	33
DR Congo	32
Third place
22 March
Benin	20
Nigeria	38

=== Semifinals ===
20 March 2024; 14:00	Egypt	38–27	Benin	Borteyman Sports Complex
20 March 2024; 14:00		(21–16)		Borteyman Sports Complex

20 March 2024; 18:00	DR Congo	29–20	Nigeria	Borteyman Sports Complex
20 March 2024; 18:00		(15–8)		Borteyman Sports Complex

=== Seventh place game ===
21 March 2024; 12:00	Togo	27–34	Ghana	Borteyman Sports Complex

=== Fifth place game ===
21 March 2024; 16:00	Mali	33–35	Kenya	Borteyman Sports Complex
21 March 2024; 16:00		(15–15)		Borteyman Sports Complex

=== Third place game ===
22 March 2024; 14:00	Benin	20–38	Nigeria	Borteyman Sports Complex
22 March 2024; 14:00		(7–17)		Borteyman Sports Complex

=== Final ===
22 March 2024; 18:30	Egypt	33–32	DR Congo	Borteyman Sports Complex
22 March 2024; 18:30		(19–14)		Borteyman Sports Complex

== Final standing ==
Rank	Team
1st place, gold medalist(s)	Egypt
2nd place, silver medalist(s)	DR Congo
3rd place, bronze medalist(s)	Nigeria
4	Benin
5	Kenya
6	Mali
7	Ghana
8	Togo
