= 1992 African Men's Handball Championship =

1992 African Men's Championship
Tournament details
- Host country: Ivory Coast
- Venue(s): 1 (in 1 host city)
- Dates: 11–24 November
- Teams: 11 (from 1 confederation)

Final positions
- Champions: Egypt (2nd title)
- Runner-up: Tunisia
- Third place: Algeria
- Fourth place: Zaire

The 1992 African Men's Handball Championship was the tenth edition of the African Men's Handball Championship, held in Yamoussoukro, Ivory Coast, from 11 to 24 November 1992. It acted as the African qualifying tournament for the 1993 World Championship in Sweden.

Egypt win their second consecutive title beating Tunisia in the final game.

== Qualified teams ==
- Algeria
- Ivory Coast (hosts)
- Djibouti
- Egypt
- Morocco
- Senegal
- Tunisia
- Zaire

== Preliminary round ==
All times are local (UTC+1).

=== Group A ===
Pos	Team	Pld	W	D	L	GF	GA	GD	Pts	Qualification
1	Egypt	1	1	0	0	23	18	+5	2	Main round
2	Senegal	1	0	0	1	18	23	−5	0	Main round
3	Congo	0	0	0	0	0	0	0	0	Withdrawn
4	Togo	0	0	0	0	0	0	0	0	Withdrawn

Source: Todor66
Rules for classification: 1) points; 2) head-to-head points; 3) head-to-head goal difference; 4) head-to-head number of goals scored; 5) goal difference.

14 November 1992; 14:00	Egypt	23–18	Senegal
14 November 1992; 14:00		(13–9)

=== Group B ===
Pos	Team	Pld	W	D	L	GF	GA	GD	Pts	Qualification
1	Algeria	2	2	0	0	43	21	+22	4	Main round
2	Zaire	2	1	0	1	26	39	−13	2	Main round
3	Morocco	2	0	0	2	34	43	−9	0	Seventh place game

Source: Todor66
Rules for classification: 1) points; 2) head-to-head points; 3) head-to-head goal difference; 4) head-to-head number of goals scored; 5) goal difference.

14 November 1992; 16:20	Algeria	22–16	Morocco
14 November 1992; 16:20		(11–7)

15 November 1992; 17:25	Zaire	21–18	Morocco
15 November 1992; 17:25		(11–8)

16 November 1992	Algeria	21–5	Zaire
16 November 1992		(12–1)

=== Group C ===
Pos	Team	Pld	W	D	L	GF	GA	GD	Pts	Qualification
1	Ivory Coast (H)	2	1	1	0	0	0	0	3	Main round
2	Tunisia	2	1	1	0	0	0	0	3	Main round
3	Djibouti	2	0	0	2	0	0	0	0	Seventh place game
4	Nigeria	0	0	0	0	0	0	0	0	Withdrawn

Source: Todor66
Rules for classification: 1) points; 2) head-to-head points; 3) head-to-head goal difference; 4) head-to-head number of goals scored; 5) goal difference.
(H) Hosts

14 November 1992; 17:25	Ivory Coast	25–25	Tunisia

15 November 1992; 14:00	Tunisia	36–18	Djibouti

16 November 1992; 17:25	Ivory Coast	v	Djibouti

== Main round ==
=== Group I ===
Pos	Team	Pld	W	D	L	GF	GA	GD	Pts	Qualification
1	Egypt	0	0	0	0	0	0	0	0	Final
2	Zaire	0	0	0	0	0	0	0	0	Third place game
3	Ivory Coast (H)	0	0	0	0	0	0	0	0	Fifth place game

Source: Todor66
Rules for classification: 1) points; 2) head-to-head points; 3) head-to-head goal difference; 4) head-to-head number of goals scored; 5) goal difference.
(H) Hosts

18 November 1992; 14:00	Egypt	v	Zaire

19 November 1992; 14:00	Egypt	v	Ivory Coast

20 November 1992; 14:00	Zaire	19–17	Ivory Coast

=== Group II ===
Pos	Team	Pld	W	D	L	GF	GA	GD	Pts	Qualification
1	Tunisia	0	0	0	0	0	0	0	0	Final
2	Algeria	0	0	0	0	0	0	0	0	Third place game
3	Senegal	0	0	0	0	0	0	0	0	Fifth place game

Source: Todor66
Rules for classification: 1) points; 2) head-to-head points; 3) head-to-head goal difference; 4) head-to-head number of goals scored; 5) goal difference.

18 November 1992; 15:45	Algeria	17–11	Senegal

19 November 1992; 15:45	Tunisia	v	Senegal

20 November 1992; 15:45	Tunisia	21–19	Algeria
20 November 1992; 15:45		(10–9)

== Knockout stage ==
=== Seventh place game ===
17 November 1992	Morocco	v	Djibouti

=== Fifth place game ===
21 November 1992; 15:45	Ivory Coast	15–14	Senegal
21 November 1992; 15:45		(12–8)

=== Third place game ===
22 November 1992; 14:30	Algeria	28–16	Zaire
22 November 1992; 14:30		(16–10)

=== Final ===
22 November 1992; 16:00	Egypt	26–24	Tunisia

== Final ranking ==
Team qualified for the 1993 World Championship

Rank	Team
Gold medal	Egypt
Silver medal	Tunisia
Bronze medal	Algeria
4	Zaire
5	Ivory Coast
6	Senegal
7	Morocco
8	Djibouti
