= 1996 African Men's Handball Championship =

1996 African Men's Championship
Tournament details
- Host country: Benin
- Venue(s): 1 (in 1 host city)
- Dates: 18–27 October
- Teams: 10 (from 1 confederation)

Final positions
- Champions: Algeria (6th title)
- Runner-up: Tunisia
- Third place: Egypt
- Fourth place: Morocco

Tournament statistics
- Matches played: 27
- Goals scored: 1,176 (43.56 per match)

The 1996 African Men's Handball Championship was the twelfth edition of the African Men's Handball Championship, held in Cotonou, Benin, from 18 to 27 October 1996. It acted as the African qualifying tournament for the 1997 World Championship in Japan.

Algeria win their sixth title beating Tunisia in the final game 21–19 after the first extra time of the history in the finals of the competition.

== Qualified teams ==
- Algeria
- Benin (hosts)
- Cameroon
- Chad (withdrew)
- Congo
- Egypt
- Ivory Coast
- Morocco
- Nigeria
- Togo
- Tunisia
- Zaire (withdrew)

== Venue ==
Cotonou	1996 African Men's Handball Championship is located in Benin
Palais des Sports de Cotonou	1996 African Men's Handball Championship is located in Benin
Capacity: 5,000	1996 African Men's Handball Championship is located in Benin

== Group stage ==
Team advance to the knockout stage

=== Group A ===
Team	Pld	W	D	L	GF	GA	GD	Pts
Tunisia	4	4	0	0	97	79	+18	8
Morocco	4	3	0	1	89	84	+5	6
Nigeria	4	2	0	2	99	89	+10	4
Ivory Coast	4	1	0	3	101	101	0	2
Togo	4	0	0	4	66	99	−33	0

18 October 1996	Nigeria	30–27	Ivory Coast	Palais des Sports, Cotonou
18 October 1996		(15–11)		Palais des Sports, Cotonou

18 October 1996	Tunisia	22–18	Togo	Palais des Sports, Cotonou
18 October 1996		(17–8)		Palais des Sports, Cotonou

19 October 1996	Morocco	22–17	Togo	Palais des Sports, Cotonou
19 October 1996		(10–6)		Palais des Sports, Cotonou

19 October 1996	Tunisia	23–22	Nigeria	Palais des Sports, Cotonou
19 October 1996		(10–9)		Palais des Sports, Cotonou

20 October 1996	Tunisia	30–21	Ivory Coast	Palais des Sports, Cotonou
20 October 1996		(13–11)		Palais des Sports, Cotonou

20 October 1996	Morocco	22–21	Nigeria	Palais des Sports, Cotonou
20 October 1996		(11–8)		Palais des Sports, Cotonou

21 October 1996	Nigeria	26–17	Togo	Palais des Sports, Cotonou
21 October 1996		(12–5)		Palais des Sports, Cotonou

21 October 1996	Morocco	27–24	Ivory Coast	Palais des Sports, Cotonou
21 October 1996		(14–15)		Palais des Sports, Cotonou

23 October 1996	Tunisia	22–18	Morocco	Palais des Sports, Cotonou
23 October 1996		(12–6)		Palais des Sports, Cotonou

23 October 1996	Ivory Coast	29–14	Togo	Palais des Sports, Cotonou
23 October 1996		(16–5)		Palais des Sports, Cotonou

=== Group B ===
Team	Pld	W	D	L	GF	GA	GD	Pts
Algeria	4	4	0	0	95	61	+34	8
Egypt	4	3	0	1	102	73	+29	6
Congo	4	1	1	2	61	80	−19	3
Cameroon	4	1	0	3	86	91	−5	2
Benin (H)	4	0	1	3	63	102	−39	1

(H) Hosts

18 October 1996	Egypt	30–18	Benin	Palais des Sports, Cotonou
18 October 1996		(17–10)		Palais des Sports, Cotonou

18 October 1996	Algeria	18–9	Congo	Palais des Sports, Cotonou
18 October 1996		(7–6)		Palais des Sports, Cotonou

19 October 1996	Benin	16–16	Congo	Palais des Sports, Cotonou
19 October 1996		(7–7)		Palais des Sports, Cotonou

19 October 1996	Algeria	23–19	Cameroon	Palais des Sports, Cotonou
19 October 1996		(10–9)		Palais des Sports, Cotonou

20 October 1996	Egypt	23–20	Cameroon	Palais des Sports, Cotonou
20 October 1996		(10–10)		Palais des Sports, Cotonou

20 October 1996	Algeria	29–10	Benin	Palais des Sports, Cotonou
20 October 1996		(13–6)		Palais des Sports, Cotonou

21 October 1996	Egypt	26–10	Congo	Palais des Sports, Cotonou
21 October 1996		(13–4)		Palais des Sports, Cotonou

21 October 1996	Congo	26–20	Cameroon	Palais des Sports, Cotonou
21 October 1996		(16–11)		Palais des Sports, Cotonou

23 October 1996	Algeria	25–23	Egypt	Palais des Sports, Cotonou
23 October 1996		(12–17)		Palais des Sports, Cotonou

23 October 1996	Cameroon	27–19	Benin	Palais des Sports, Cotonou
23 October 1996		(12–11)		Palais des Sports, Cotonou

== Knockout stage ==
Semifinals
25 October – Cotonou
Tunisia	18
Egypt	16
25 October – Cotonou
Algeria	24
Morocco	16

Final
27 October – Cotonou
Tunisia	19
Algeria (ET)	21
Third place
27 October – Cotonou
Morocco	21
Egypt	28

=== Semifinals ===
25 October 1996	Tunisia	18–16	Egypt	Palais des Sports, Cotonou
25 October 1996		(9–9)		Palais des Sports, Cotonou

25 October 1996	Algeria	24–16	Morocco	Palais des Sports, Cotonou
25 October 1996		(11–6)		Palais des Sports, Cotonou

=== Ninth place game ===
26 October 1996	Benin	26–25	Togo	Palais des Sports, Cotonou
26 October 1996		(11–13)		Palais des Sports, Cotonou

=== Seventh place game ===
26 October 1996	Cameroon	28–27	Ivory Coast	Palais des Sports, Cotonou
26 October 1996		(11–15)		Palais des Sports, Cotonou

=== Fifth place game ===
26 October 1996	Nigeria	26–22	Congo	Palais des Sports, Cotonou
26 October 1996		(12–9)		Palais des Sports, Cotonou

=== Third place game ===
27 October 1996	Morocco	21–28	Egypt	Palais des Sports, Cotonou
27 October 1996		(13–18)		Palais des Sports, Cotonou

=== Final ===
27 October 1996
Tunisia
19–21 (ET)
Algeria
Palais des Sports, Cotonou

(7–8)

FT: 17–17 ET: 2–4

== Final ranking ==
Team qualified for the 1997 World Championship

Rank	Team
Gold medal	Algeria
Silver medal	Tunisia
Bronze medal	Egypt
4	Morocco
5	Nigeria
6	Congo
7	Cameroon
8	Ivory Coast
9	Benin
10	Togo
