= Uganda men's national handball team =

Uganda

Information
- Association: Uganda Handball Federation
- Coach: Jimmy Orotin
- Assistant coach: Patrick Odora

Colours
1st	2nd

Results

African Championship
- Appearances: 1 (First in 2026)
- Best result: 16th (2026)
- Last updated on Unknown.

The Uganda national handball team is the national handball team of Uganda.

== African Championship record ==
- 2026 – 16th place
