= Central African Republic men's national handball team =

Central African Republic

Information
- Association: Fédération Centrafricaine de Handball

Colours
1st	2nd

Results

African Championship
- Appearances: 1 (First in 1974)
- Best result: 5th (1974)
- Last updated on Unknown.

The Central African Republic national handball team is the national handball team of the Central African Republic.

== African Championship record ==
- 1974 – 5th place
