= Istituto Scolastico Italiano "Giovan Battista Hodierna" =

Location
- Avenue Tahar Ben Ammar 1013 El Menzah 9B – Tunisi; Tunis; Tunisia
- 36.8508269°N 10.1494092°E

Information
- Other name: Italian: Istituto Scolastico Italiano di Tunisi
- Former name: Italian: Scuola Italiana di Tunisi
- Type: Private international pre-school, primary and secondary school
- Established: 1966; 60 years ago
- Website: www.isihodiernatunisi.com

Istituto Scolastico Italiano "Giovan Battista Hodierna" or the Istituto Scolastico Italiano di Tunisi is a private Italian international school in El Menzah, Tunis, Tunisia.

The school was founded in 1966 as the Scuola Italiana di Tunisi. It serves preschool, primary school, lower secondary school, and upper secondary school. The school is located in a three-storey building.
