= 1976 African Men's Handball Championship =

1976 African Men's Championship
Tournament details
- Host country: Algeria
- Venue: 1 (in 1 host city)
- Dates: 10–18 April
- Teams: 7 (from 1 confederation)

Final positions
- Champions: Tunisia (2nd title)
- Runners-up: Egypt
- Third place: Algeria
- Fourth place: Cameroon

Tournament statistics
- Matches played: 12
- Goals scored: 424 (35.33 per match)

The 1976 African Men's Handball Championship was the second edition of the African Men's Handball Championship, held in Algiers, Algeria, from 10 to 18 April 1976. It acted as the African qualifying tournament for the 1976 Summer Olympics in Montreal.

In the final, Tunisia won their second title to beat Egypt, however Egypt was disqualified and the hosts Algeria took second place.

== Qualified teams ==
- Algeria (hosts)
- Cameroon
- Egypt
- Ivory Coast
- Senegal
- Togo
- Tunisia
- Morocco (withdrew)

== Venue ==
Algiers	Algiers is located in Algeria
Harcha Arena; Capacity: 5,000	Algiers is located in Algeria

== Group stage ==
All times are local (UTC+1).

Team advance to the final
Team advance to the third place game

=== Group A ===
Team	Pld	W	D	L	GF	GA	GD	Pts
Tunisia	3	3	0	0	47	34	+13	6
Algeria (H)	3	2	0	1	72	56	+16	4
Togo	3	1	0	2	51	57	−6	2
Ivory Coast	3	0	0	3	42	65	−23	0

(H) Hosts

10 April 1976; 17:00	Togo	16–13	Ivory Coast	Harcha Arena, Algiers

10 April 1976; 19:30	Algeria	12–14	Tunisia	Harcha Arena, Algiers

12 April 1976; 18:00	Togo	11–13	Tunisia	Harcha Arena, Algiers

12 April 1976; 20:30	Algeria	29–18	Ivory Coast	Harcha Arena, Algiers

14 April 1976; 18:00	Tunisia	20–11	Ivory Coast	Harcha Arena, Algiers

14 April 1976; 20:30	Algeria	31–24	Togo	Harcha Arena, Algiers

=== Group B ===
Team	Pld	W	D	L	GF	GA	GD	Pts
Egypt	2	2	0	0	41	29	+12	4
Cameroon	2	1	0	1	35	34	+1	2
Senegal	2	0	0	2	33	46	−13	0
Morocco (W)	0	0	0	0	0	0	0	0

(W) Withdrew

11 April 1976; 18:00	Egypt	18–12	Cameroon	Harcha Arena, Algiers

13 April 1976; 19:00	Egypt	23–17	Senegal	Harcha Arena, Algiers

15 April 1976; 19:00	Senegal	16–23	Cameroon	Harcha Arena, Algiers

== Knockout stage ==
=== Fifth place game ===
18 April 1976; 15:00	Senegal	19–14	Togo	Harcha Arena, Algiers

=== Third place game ===
18 April 1976; 17:00	Algeria	24–17	Cameroon	Harcha Arena, Algiers

=== Final ===
18 April 1976; 19:00	Tunisia	15–14	Egypt	Harcha Arena, Algiers

== Final ranking ==
Egypt finished 2nd however it was disqualified. So Algeria third finished 2nd and Cameroon 3rd.

Team qualified for the 1976 Summer Olympics

Rank	Team
Gold medal	Tunisia
-	Egypt (disqualified)
Silver medal	Algeria
Bronze medal	Cameroon
4	Senegal
5	Togo
6	Ivory Coast
