= 1994 African Men's Handball Championship =

1994 African Men's Championship
Tournament details
- Host country: Tunisia
- Venue(s): 1 (in 1 host city)
- Dates: 8–17 November
- Teams: 9 (from 1 confederation)

Final positions
- Champions: Tunisia (4th title)
- Runners-up: Algeria
- Third place: Egypt
- Fourth place: Morocco

The 1994 African Men's Handball Championship was the eleventh edition of the African Men's Handball Championship, held in Tunis, Tunisia, from 5 to 24 November 1994. It acted as the African qualifying tournament for the 1995 World Championship in Iceland.

Tunisia win their fourth title beating Algeria in the final game 18–16.

== Qualified teams ==
- Algeria
- Congo
- Djibouti
- Egypt
- Ghana
- Ivory Coast
- Morocco
- Senegal
- Togo
- Tunisia (hosts)

== Venue ==
Tunis	1994 African Men's Handball Championship is located in Tunisia
El Menzah Sports Palace	1994 African Men's Handball Championship is located in Tunisia
Capacity: 5,500	1994 African Men's Handball Championship is located in Tunisia

== Group stage ==
Team advance to the knockout stage

=== Group A ===
Team	Pld	W	D	L	GF	GA	GD	Pts
Tunisia (H)	4	4	0	0	144	72	+72	8
Algeria	4	3	0	1	125	63	+62	6
Congo	4	2	0	2	93	96	−3	4
Senegal	4	1	0	3	97	112	−15	2
Djibouti	4	0	0	4	51	167	−116	0

(H) Hosts

8 November 1994	Congo	28–25	Senegal	El Menzah Sports Palace, Tunis

8 November 1994	Tunisia	52–10	Djibouti	El Menzah Sports Palace, Tunis

9 November 1994	Tunisia	28–16	Congo	El Menzah Sports Palace, Tunis

9 November 1994	Algeria	41–8	Djibouti	El Menzah Sports Palace, Tunis

10 November 1994	Algeria	32–14	Senegal	El Menzah Sports Palace, Tunis

10 November 1994	Congo	37–16	Djibouti	El Menzah Sports Palace, Tunis

12 November 1994	Algeria	27–12	Congo	El Menzah Sports Palace, Tunis

12 November 1994	Tunisia	35–21	Senegal	El Menzah Sports Palace, Tunis

13 November 1994	Senegal	37–17	Djibouti	El Menzah Sports Palace, Tunis

13 November 1994	Tunisia	29–25	Algeria	El Menzah Sports Palace, Tunis

=== Group B ===
Team	Pld	W	D	L	GF	GA	GD	Pts
Egypt	3	3	0	0	82	51	+31	6
Morocco	3	2	0	1	79	60	+19	4
Ivory Coast	3	1	0	2	63	65	−2	2
Togo	3	0	0	3	50	98	−48	0

8 November 1994	Egypt	25–17	Morocco	El Menzah Sports Palace, Tunis

8 November 1994	Ivory Coast	27–18	Togo	El Menzah Sports Palace, Tunis

10 November 1994	Egypt	21–18	Ivory Coast	El Menzah Sports Palace, Tunis

10 November 1994	Morocco	36–16	Togo	El Menzah Sports Palace, Tunis

13 November 1994	Egypt	36–26	Togo	El Menzah Sports Palace, Tunis

13 November 1994	Morocco	26–19	Ivory Coast	El Menzah Sports Palace, Tunis

== Knockout stage ==
Semifinals
15 November – Tunis
Tunisia	25
Morocco	15
15 November – Tunis
Algeria	26
Egypt	18

Final
17 November – Tunis
Tunisia	18
Algeria (ET)	16

=== Semifinals ===
25 October 1996	Tunisia	25–15	Morocco	El Menzah Sports Palace, Tunis

15 November 1994	Algeria	26–18	Egypt	El Menzah Sports Palace, Tunis

=== Final ===
17 November 1994
Tunisia
18–16 (ET)
Algeria
El Menzah Sports Palace, Tunis

FT: 14–14 ET: 4–2

== Final ranking ==
Team qualified for the 1995 World Championship

Rank	Team
Gold medal	Tunisia
Silver medal	Algeria
Bronze medal	Egypt
4	Morocco
5	Congo
6	Ivory Coast
7	Togo
8	Senegal
9	Djibouti
