= Limete Tower =

Concrete tower in Kinshasa

- Tour de l'Échangeur
- Interactive map of the Limete Tower area

General information
- Location: Limete, Kinshasa, Democratic Republic of the Congo
- Coordinates: 04°22′27.8″S 15°20′43.5″E
- Opened: September 2022

The Limete Tower (also known as French: Tour de l'Échangeur; "Interchange Tower" or French: Tour des Héros nationaux du Congo; "Tower of the National Heroes of Congo") is a tower located in the commune of Limete in Kinshasa, the capital city of the Democratic Republic of the Congo.

== History ==
President Mobutu Sese Seko decided to rename the Boulevard Léopold II, a major road connecting N'djili Airport to the city centre, to Boulevard Lumumba in 1966, a year after taking over power. He also wanted to erect a monument to Patrice Lumumba at the cross-road to Limete from the boulevard. The foundation stone for the tower was laid by Julius Nyerere, then the president of Tanzania, on 24 November 1967, while construction began in 1969. The design for the tower was by French-Tunisian architect Olivier-Clément Cacoub and construction to be done by a Yugoslav company. The top of the tower was supposed to be a copper spire with the tower comprising four cylindrical columns of reinforced concrete. Construction stopped by 1974 after the building reached 12 floors. The tower complex stood as a white elephant for many years. The tower stands at a square which was called Exchange Square until 2011 when it was renamed as Reconstruction Square.

A statue of Patrice Lumumba was erected in the square on 17 January 2002. Additional construction work around the base and the square began in 2010 under the presidency of Joseph Kabila, by adding an amusement park, fountains and a performing arts venue at a cost of US$11 million. The tower also hosts the Museum of Contemporary and Multimedia Arts which has collections of Congolese artists and sculptors.
