= El Menzah Stadium =

Sports stadium in Tunis, Tunisia

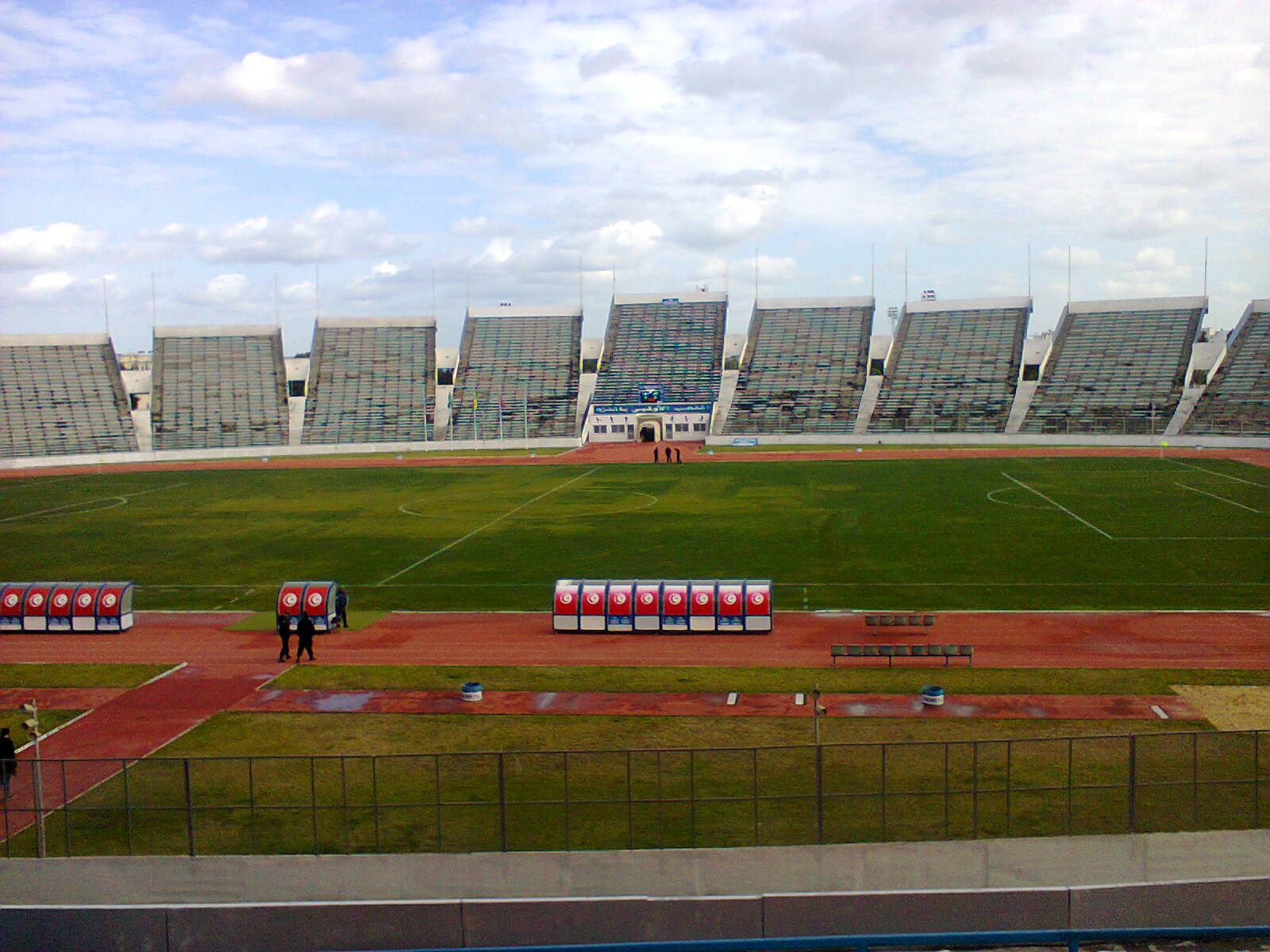
- El Menzah Stadium in 2015.
- Interactive map of El Menzah Stadium
- Full name: Stade Olympique d'El Menzah
- Location: El Menzah, Tunis, Tunisia
- Coordinates: 36°50′23.2″N 10°11′7.3″E
- Capacity: 39,858
- Surface: Grass
- Record attendance: 60,000 (Michael Jackson concert, 7 October 1996)
- Field size: 105 x 68 m

Construction
- Groundbreaking: 1964
- Built: 1964–1967
- Opened: 1967
- Renovated: 1994, 2022–
- Closed: 2019
- Architect: Olivier-Clément Cacoub

The El Menzah Stadium is an under renovation football stadium located in El Menzah, Tunis, Tunisia. It is located in the Olympic City of El Menzah, near the El Menzah Sports Palace and El Menzah Olympic Swimming Pool. Its capacity is 39,858 spectators, it was built for the 1967 Mediterranean Games on the site of the former Vélodrome Stadium.

The stadium is currently closed since 2019 for renovation and maintenance work.

== History ==
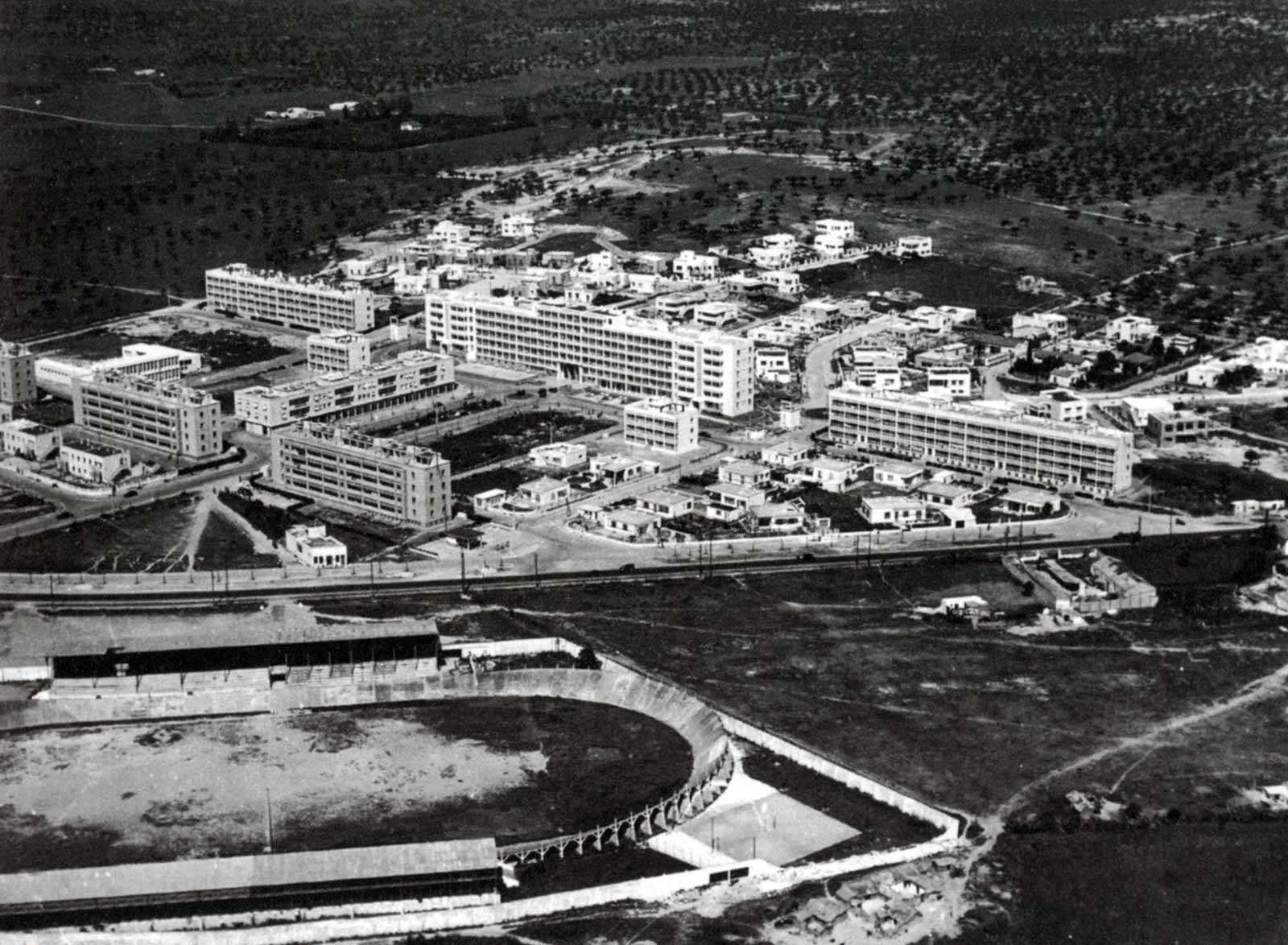
Vélodrome Stadium before its demolition.

The Vélodrome Stadium was the stadium that preceded El Menzah Stadium. It was built in 1927 on the same site and became the home stadium of US Tunis and Italia de Tunis. It had a capacity of 5,000 spectators.

The stadium was named after the president of US Tunis, Henri Smadja. It was also named after Carmel Borg, a Maltese businessman, and became known as Smadja Borg Stadium. It served as the main stadium for the Tunisian national team during the 1930s and 1940s, and hosted the Tunisian Cup final beginning with the 1929 edition, until the construction of the Géo André Stadium in 1942.

After World War II, the stadium was renamed in honor of Victor Perez, a Tunisian boxer who became world flyweight champion in 1931 and was killed in the Nazi concentration camps in Gliwice in 1945.

After Tunisian independence, Géo André Stadium became the home stadium of the national team. The Vélodrome Stadium was later demolished and completely rebuilt in 1967 through cooperation between Tunisian and Bulgarian engineers.

The stadium has been closed since 2019 due to structural issues. Initial renovation work began in 2022 with a budget of 100 million dinars, but the project later evolved into a full reconstruction. As of March 2026, reconstruction is scheduled to begin in 2026 following a memorandum of understanding signed with Chinese partners in October 2025.

The project, funded by 250 million dinars in foreign loans, 117 million from the state budget, and a 150 million dinar grant from China, aims to modernize the facility with updated equipment while preserving its historic architecture. Completion is expected around 2027. The reconstruction is part of a broader redevelopment of the El Menzah Olympic complex.

On 29 October 2026, the commercial contract for the reconstruction of the stadium was signed between the Tunisian State, represented by the Ministry of Equipment and Housing and representatives of the contracting consortium China Railway construction Engineering Group (CRCEG) and China CAMC Engineering (CAMCE).

== Sporting events ==
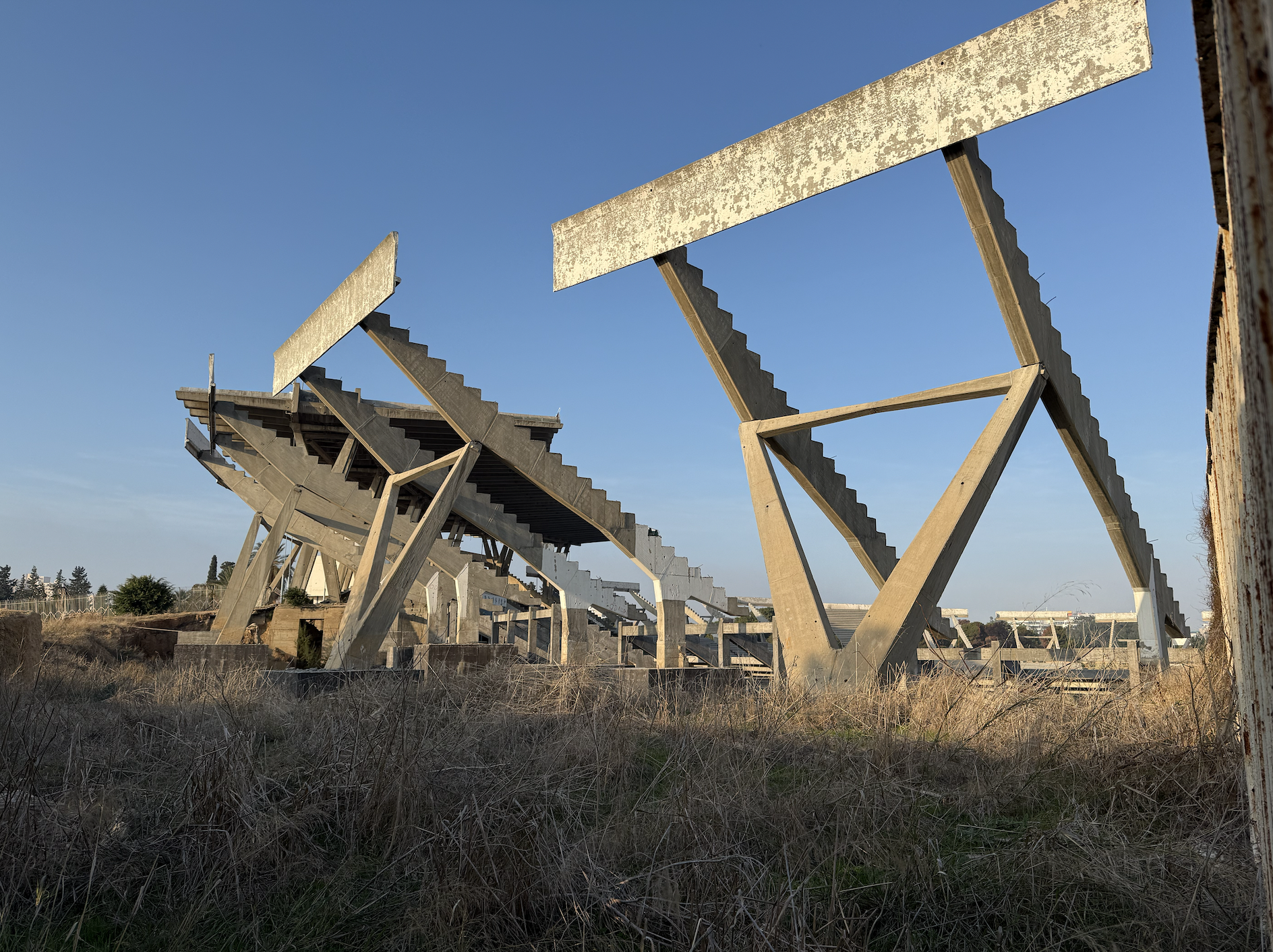
El Menzah Stadium during reconstruction in December 2025.

The stadium was built to host the 1967 Mediterranean Games at the same time as the El Menzah Olympic Swimming Pool and El Menzah Sports Palace. Since then, it has formed part of Tunisia's main sports complex. Tunis' three major football clubs, ES Tunis, Club Africain, and Stade Tunisien have played matches there.

In 1977, the stadium hosted ten matches of the inaugural edition of the FIFA U-20 World Cup, including the final between Mexico and the Soviet Union. The stadium was completely renovated for the 1994 African Cup of Nations. The VIP section consists of a grandstand and two lounges that can accommodate 300 people in a cocktail configuration. The stadium hosted matches of the Tunisia national football team until the inauguration of the Hammadi Agrebi Stadium in 2001.

== Music events ==
On 7 October 1996, Michael Jackson held a concert at this stadium as part of his HIStory World Tour, in front of 60,000 fans; it remains the only concert Jackson ever performed in the Arab world. The singer had planned other dates in the region prior to the concert in Tunisia—specifically, performances in Morocco on 27 and 29 September, and in Cairo on 2 October—but these shows never took place, due to a prohibition by the Moroccan authorities and security concerns in Cairo. These three Arab-world dates were ultimately replaced by three concerts held at the Amsterdam Arena.

Sting performed at the stadium during his Brand New Day Tour on 28 April 2001. Mariah Carey opened The Adventures of Mimi Tour at the stadium with concerts on 22 and 24 July 2006.

== See also ==
- El Menzah Sports Palace
- El Menzah Olympic Swimming Pool

Preceded by first stadium	FIFA U-20 World Cup; Final Venue; 1977	Succeeded by National Stadium Tokyo
Preceded by Stade Leopold Senghor Dakar	African Cup of Nations; Final Venue; 1994	Succeeded by FNB Stadium Johannesburg
