= Djibouti men's national handball team =

Djibouti

Information
- Association: Fédération Djiboutienne de Handball

Colours
1st	2nd

Results

African Championship
- Appearances: 2 (First in 1992)
- Best result: 8th (1992)
- Last updated on Unknown.

The Djibouti national handball team is the national handball team of Djibouti.

== African Championship record ==
- 1992 – 8th place
- 1994 – 10th place
