= Olivier-Clément Cacoub =

French-Tunisian architect (1920–2008)

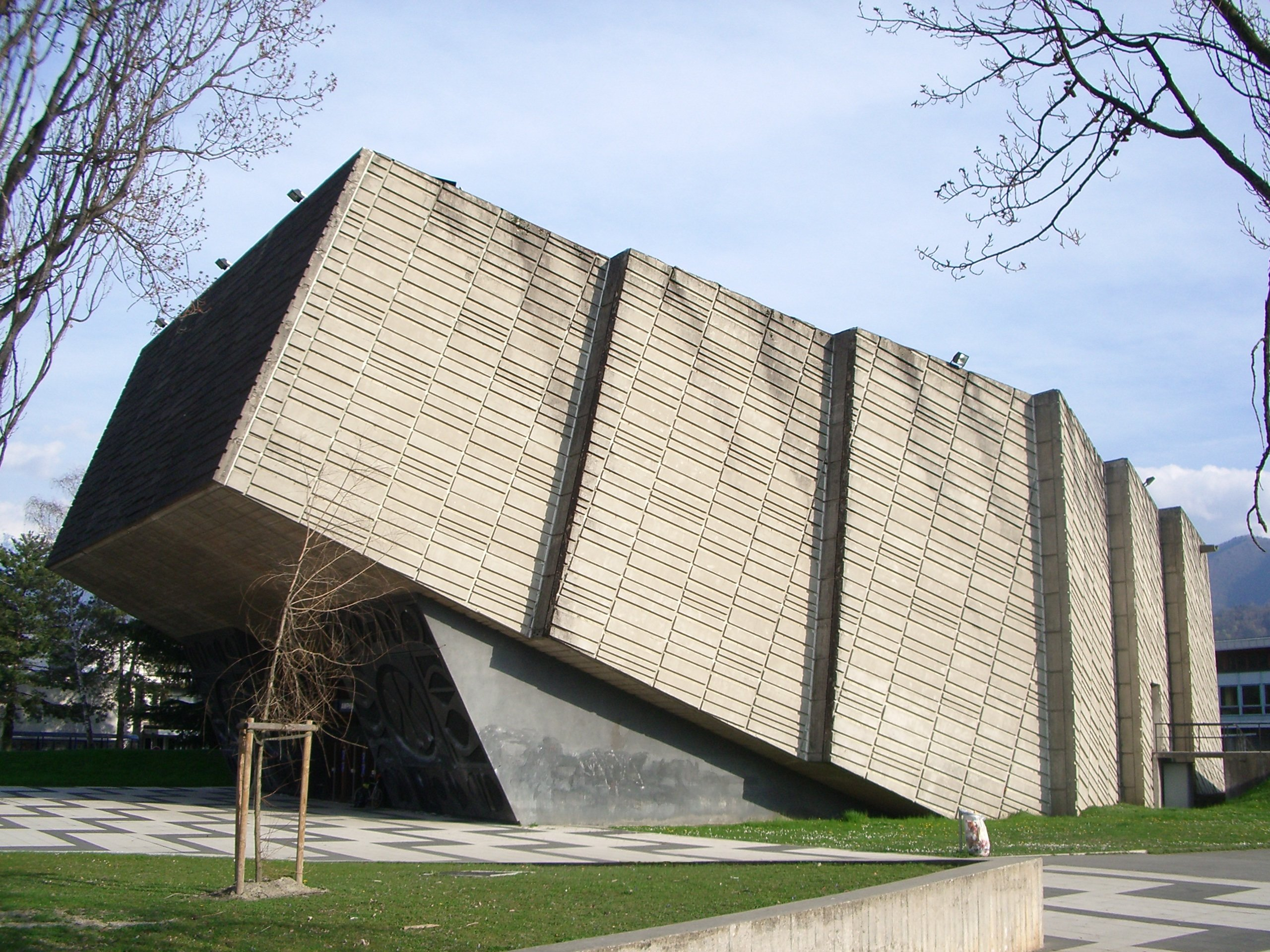
- Amphi Weil, Grenoble University
- Born: April 14, 1920; Tunis, Tunisia
- Died: April 27, 2008 (aged 88); Paris, France
- Occupation: Architect
- Awards: Grand Prix de Rome (1953)

Olivier-Clément Cacoub, (born April 14, 1920, in Tunis, and died April 27, 2008, in Paris), was a French architect of Tunisian-Jewish origin, known for working in the International Style and Brutalism.

== Career ==
He studied at the Lycée de Tunis, the National School of Fine Arts of Tunis, the École nationale supérieure des beaux-arts de Lyon (atelier Bourdeix), at the École nationale supérieure des beaux-arts de Paris (atelier Pontremoli-Leconte), and at the Institute of Urban Planning at the University of Paris.

He began his career in Tunisia, as a consulting architect to the Tunisian Republic under President Habib Bourguiba. He continued practicing in France, Russia, and across Africa.

== Awards ==
He was awarded the Grand Prix de Rome in 1953, and held the title of chief architect of civil buildings and national palaces for the French Republic (fr:Architecte des bâtiments civils et palais nationaux).

He was honored with the Commander of the Legion of Honor and the National Order of Merit, Officer of Arts and Letters, Grand Officer of the Order of the Tunisian Republic, Grand Officer of the Lion of Finland, Grand Officer of the National Order of the Coast of Ivory, Romanian order Tudor Vladimirescu, of the order of valor (Cameroon). He was also awarded gold medals of French architecture from the Institut de France and the City of Paris.

== Personal ==
He had two children with his first wife, Mireille Boccara, and three with his second wife, Danielle Cayat, whom he married in 1973.

In 1973, with his first wife, he created the Dominique Cacoub association which provided financial assistance to people suffering from leukemia and their families, named after his daughter.

He died on April 27, 2008, in Paris, at the age of 88. He was buried on April 30 in the Montparnasse cemetery, and his funeral was attended by Bernadette Chirac.

== Works ==
=== Tunisia ===
- The presidential palace, Carthage
- The presidential palace, Skanès
- The Tunis convention center
- The Monastir convention center
- The Olympic city and stadium of El Menzah
- The Bourguiba mausoleum of Monastir
- The Abou Nawas and Africa hotels in Tunis
- Mustapha-Ben-Jannet stadium in Monastir
- The seaside resort of Port El-Kantaoui
- Banque Internationale Arabe de Tunisie headquarters, Tunis

=== Cameroon ===
- The presidential palace, Yaoundé
- The country residence of Cameroonian President Paul Biya in Mvomeka'a

=== Republic of Congo ===
- The French cultural center of Brazzaville

=== Democratic Republic of the Congo ===
- The presidential palace, Gbadolite
- Limete Tower, Kinshasa

=== Ivory Coast ===
- The presidential palace, Yamoussoukro
- The Félix-Houphouët-Boigny Foundation in Yamoussoukro
- l'hôtel Président in Yamoussoukro

=== The Azores (Portugal) ===
- Hotel Monte Palace, São Miguel

=== France ===
- University of Orléans Campus
- The extension of the Palais des Festivals in Cannes
- Grenoble Alpes University's "Domaine Universitaire," including the Louis Weil amphitheater, in collaboration with the artist Edgar Pillet
- the Palais de la Méditerranée in Nice
- the Cité internationale des arts in Paris, in cooperation with architects Paul Tournon and Ngô Viết Thụ
- the renovation of the Saint-Germain market in Paris
- Passy Park, Paris

Russia

- Cosmos hotel, Moscow

== Gallery ==
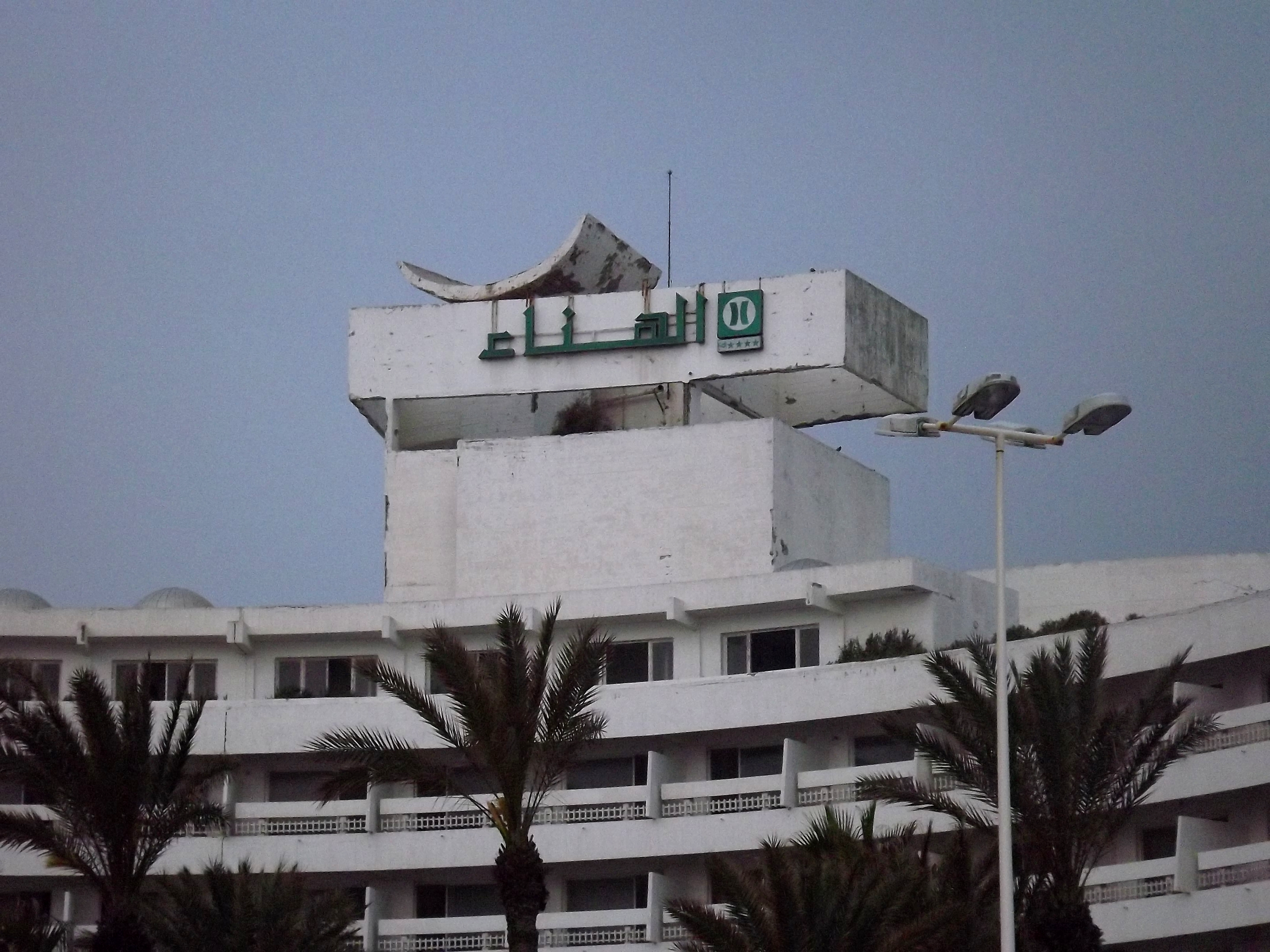
Hôtel el Hana, Sousse, Tunisia

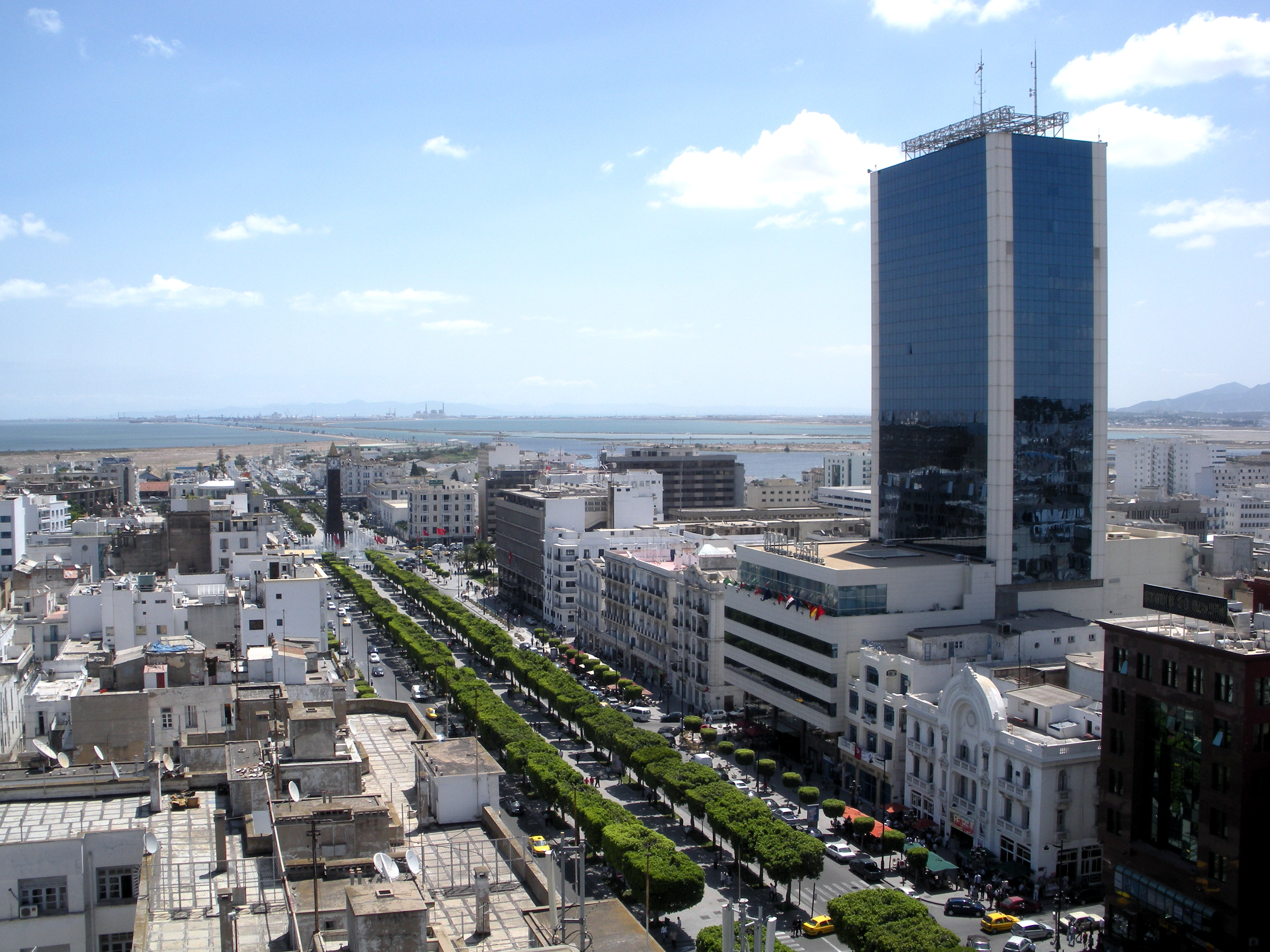
L'hôtel Africa dominates l'avenue Habib-Bourguiba in Tunis, Tunisia.

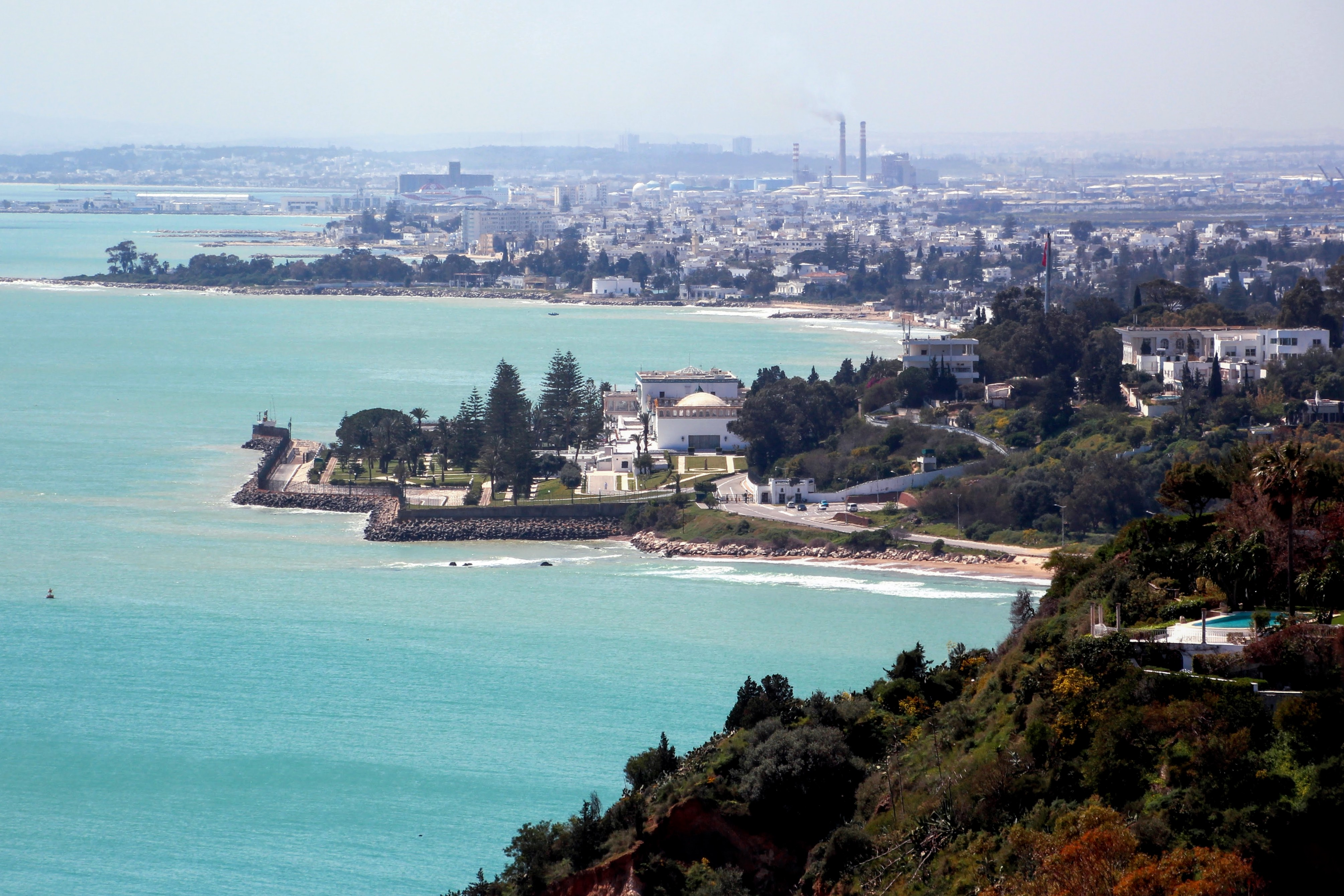
Presidential Palace, Carthage, Tunisia (1960–1969)

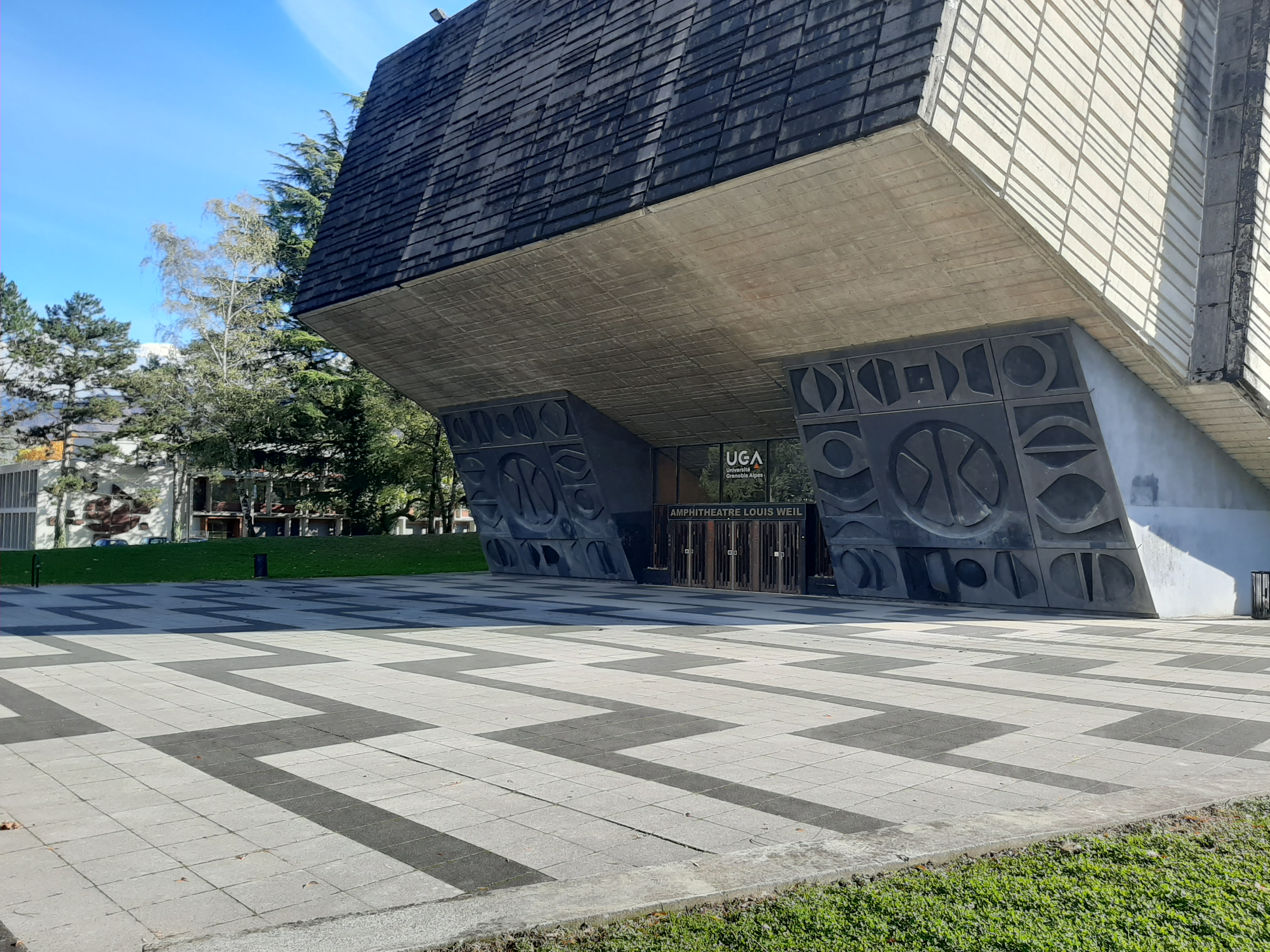
Louis Weil Amphitheatre, Grenoble Alpes University (1969)

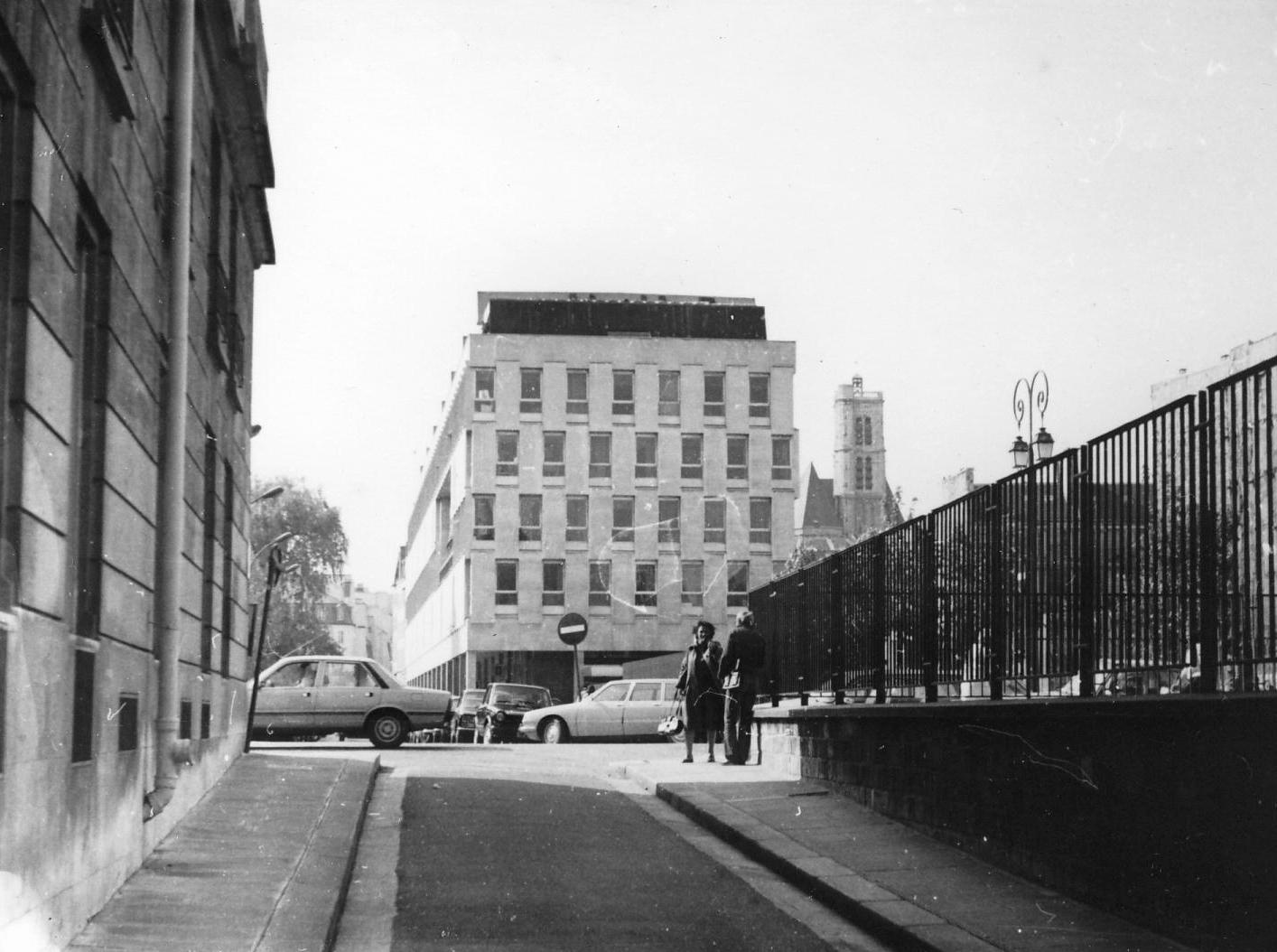
Cité Internationale des Arts, Paris (1981)

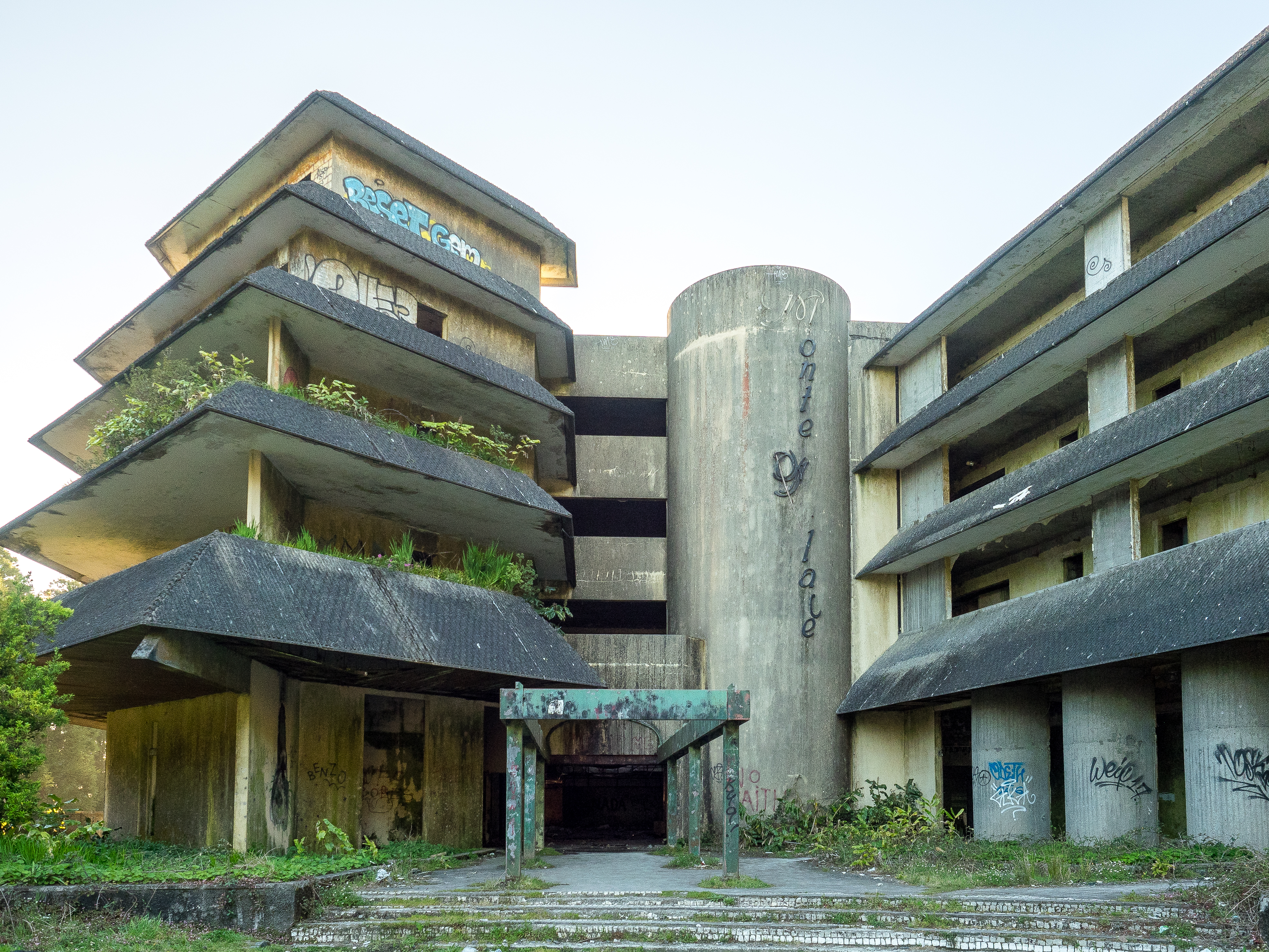
Monte Palace Hotel, São Miguel Island, Azores Portugal. (1989)

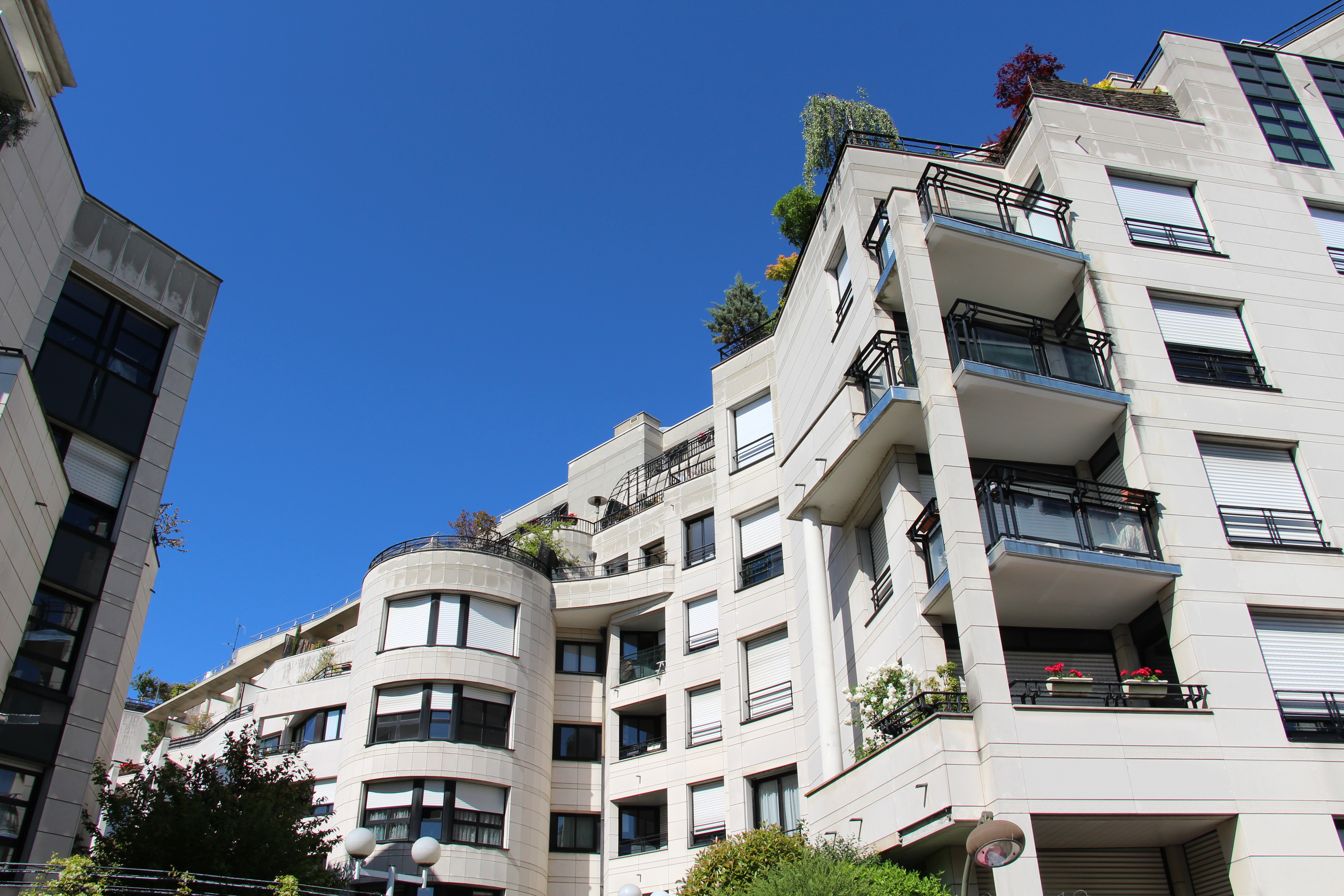
Rue de la Montagne de l'Espérou Housing units, Paris (1989–91)

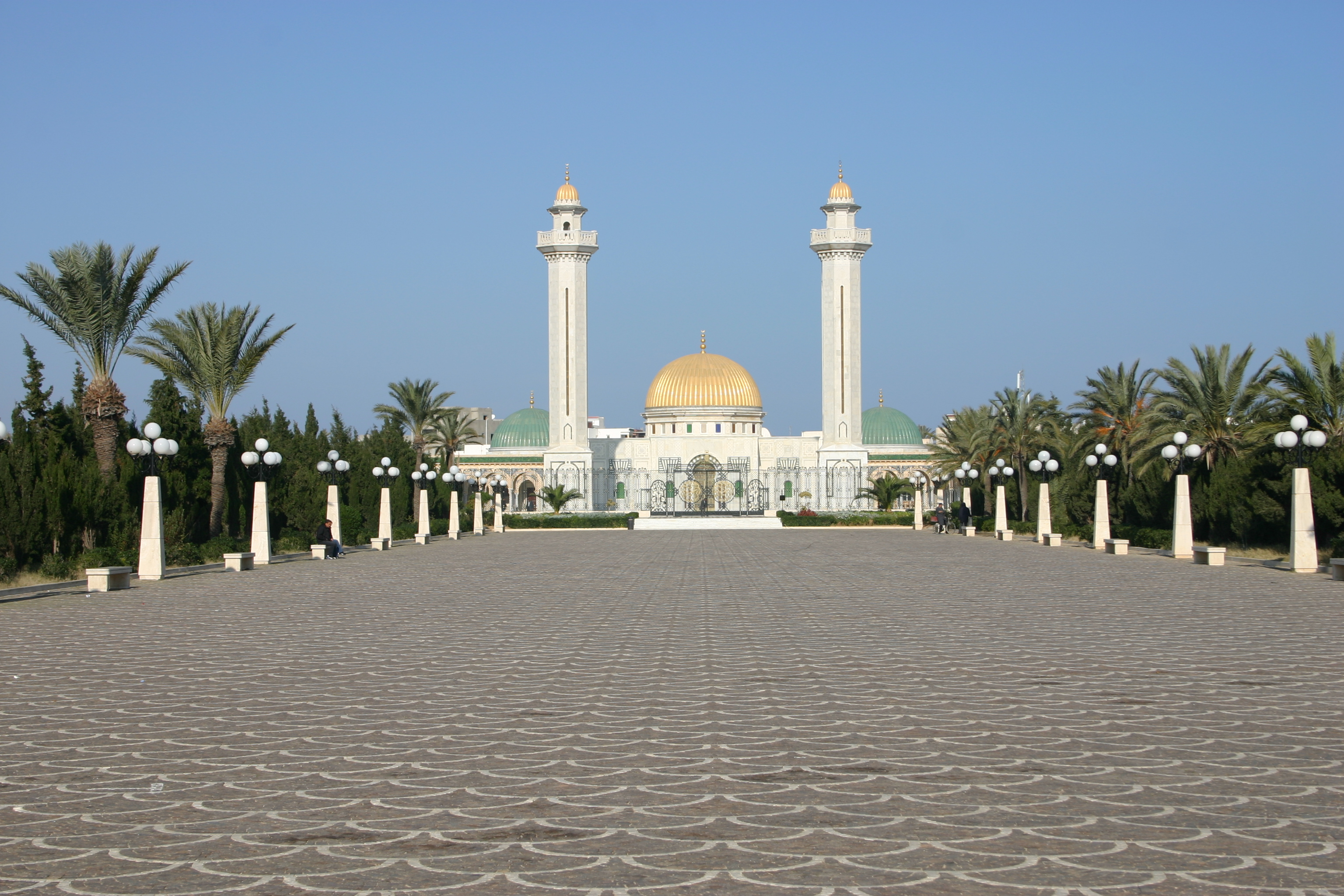
Mausoleum of Habib Bourguiba, Monastir, Tunisia (2000)
