= Benin men's national handball team =

National handball team of Benin

Benin

Information
- Association: Fédération Béninoise de Handball
- Coach: Basile Pinto
- Assistant coach: Régis Gnonlonfoun; Tanguy Ronan

Colours
| 1st | 2nd |

Results

African Championship
- Appearances: 2 (First in 1996)
- Best result: 9th (1996)
- Last updated on Unknown.

The Benin national handball team is the national handball team of Benin. In March 2025, the IHF donated a floor to the Fédération Béninoise de Handball to increase the handball growth.

== African Championship record ==
- 1996 – 9th place
- 2026 – 13th place
