= African Men's Handball Championship =

Men's national handball team tournament

- Current season, competition or edition: 2026 African Men's Handball Championship
- Sport: Handball
- Founded: 1974
- First season: 1974
- No. of teams: 16
- Continent: CAHB (Africa)
- Most recent champion: Egypt (10th title)
- Most titles: Egypt; Tunisia (10 titles)

The African Handball Nations Championship is the official competition for senior national handball teams of Africa, and takes place every two years. In addition to crowning the African champions, the tournament also serves as a qualifying tournament for the Olympic Games and for World Handball Championship. Started in 1974, it is the oldest continental handball competition. The current champions are Egypt, who won the 2026 tournament in Rwanda.

Only three countries have won the tournament. Tunisia, winner of the first edition, has won the title a record ten times tied with Egypt (ten titles), and Algeria, with seven titles, are the only two other teams to have won the competition.

Both Morocco and Algeria were banned from hosting the African Handball Championship in 2022 and 2024, Egypt were chosen to host the tournaments instead.

== Summaries ==
Year	Host	Final			Third place match		
Year	Host	Champion	Score	Runner-up	Third place	Score	Fourth place
1974; Details	Tunisia	Tunisia	^{n/a}	Cameroon	Senegal	^{n/a}	Togo
1976; Details	Algeria	Tunisia	^{n1}	Algeria	Cameroon	^{n1}	Senegal
1979; Details	(Republic of the Congo); Congo	Tunisia	21–17	Egypt	Algeria	26–24	Congo
1981; Details	Tunisia	Algeria	30–25	Ivory Coast	Tunisia	–	Egypt
1983; Details	Egypt	Algeria	25–24	Congo	Tunisia	29–24	Egypt
1985; Details	Angola	Algeria	23–17	Tunisia	Congo	23–20	Egypt
1987; Details	Morocco	Algeria	22–16	Egypt	Tunisia	21–16	Congo
1989; Details	Algeria	Algeria	18–17	Egypt	Tunisia	19–18	Congo
1991; Details	Egypt	Egypt	^{n/a}	Algeria	Tunisia	^{n/a}	Morocco
1992; Details	Ivory Coast	Egypt	26–24	Tunisia	Algeria	28–16	Zaire
1994; Details	Tunisia	Tunisia	18–16 (ET)	Algeria	Egypt	–	Morocco
1996; Details	Benin	Algeria	21–19 (ET)	Tunisia	Egypt	28–21	Morocco
1998; Details	South Africa	Tunisia	22–17	Algeria	Egypt	35–26	Nigeria
2000; Details	Algeria	Egypt	^{n/a}	Algeria	Tunisia	^{n/a}	Morocco
2002; Details	Morocco	Tunisia	25–19	Algeria	Egypt	35–25	Morocco
2004; Details	Egypt	Egypt	31–28	Tunisia	Angola	31–30	Algeria
2006; Details	Tunisia	Tunisia	26–21	Egypt	Morocco	26–25	Angola
2008; Details	Angola	Egypt	27–25	Tunisia	Algeria	23–20	Angola
2010; Details	Egypt	Tunisia	24–21	Egypt	Algeria	30–22	DR Congo
2012; Details	Morocco	Tunisia	23–20	Algeria	Egypt	29–15	Morocco
2014; Details	Algeria	Algeria	25–21	Tunisia	Egypt	31–24	Angola
2016; Details	Egypt	Egypt	21–19	Tunisia	Angola	25–19	Algeria
2018; Details	Gabon	Tunisia	26–24	Egypt	Angola	29–26	Morocco
2020; Details	Tunisia	Egypt	27–22	Tunisia	Algeria	32–27	Angola
2022; Details	Egypt	Egypt	37–25	Cape Verde	Morocco	28–24	Tunisia
2024; Details	Egypt	Egypt	29–21	Algeria	Tunisia	35–28	Cape Verde
2026; Details	Rwanda	Egypt	37–24	Tunisia	Cape Verde	29–23	Algeria

^n1 Egypt finished 2nd however it was disqualified.
^n/a A round-robin tournament determined the final standings.

== Medal table ==
Rank	Nation	Gold	Silver	Bronze	Total
1	Tunisia	10	9	7	26
2	Egypt	10	6	6	22
3	Algeria	7	8	5	20
4	Cameroon	0	1	1	2
4	Cape Verde	0	1	1	2
4	Congo	0	1	1	2
7	Ivory Coast	0	1	0	1
8	Angola	0	0	3	3
9	Morocco	0	0	2	2
10	Senegal	0	0	1	1
Totals (10 entries)		27	27	27	81

== Participating nations ==
Legend

- 1st – Champions
- 2nd – Runners-up
- 3rd – Third place
- 4th – Fourth place

- Q — Qualified for upcoming tournament
- •• — Qualified but withdrew
- • — Did not qualify
- × — Did not enter / Withdrew from the Championship
- ×× — Disqualified / Banned
- — Hosts

Team	(Tunisia) 1974	(Algeria) 1976	(Republic of the Congo) 1979	(Tunisia) 1981	(Egypt) 1983	(Angola) 1985	(Morocco) 1987	(Algeria) 1989	(Egypt) 1991	(Ivory Coast) 1992	(Tunisia) 1994	(Benin) 1996	(South Africa) 1998	(Algeria) 2000	(Morocco) 2002	(Egypt) 2004	(Tunisia) 2006	(Angola) 2008	(Egypt) 2010	(Morocco) 2012	(Algeria) 2014	(Egypt) 2016	(Gabon) 2018	(Tunisia) 2020	(Egypt) 2022	(Egypt) 2024	(Rwanda) 2026	Years
Algeria	×	2nd	3rd	1st	1st	1st	1st	1st	2nd	3rd	2nd	1st	2nd	2nd	2nd	4th	5th	3rd	3rd	2nd	1st	4th	6th	3rd	5th	2nd	4th	26
Angola			9th	5th	5th	5th	5th	7th					8th		6th	3rd	4th	4th	5th	6th	4th	3rd	3rd	4th	8th	8th	5th	20
Benin												9th															13th	2
Burkina Faso																				12th								1
Cameroon	2nd	3rd	5th			8th						7th	9th		5th	5th	9th	7th	10th	7th	5th	5th	9th	12th	12th	10th	10th	19
Cape Verde																								5th	2nd	4th	3rd	4
Central African Rep.	5th																											1
Congo			4th	7th	2nd	3rd	4th	4th	7th		5th	6th	6th	5th	11th	10th	6th		8th	9th	7th	8th	7th	9th		13th	11th	22
DR Congo	×	×	×	×	×	×	×	×	×	4th	•	•	•	7th	8th	8th	11th	5th	4th	8th	10th	7th	8th	7th	7th	6th		14
Djibouti										8th	10th																	2
Egypt	•	××	2nd	4th	4th	4th	2nd	2nd	1st	1st	3rd	3rd	3rd	1st	3rd	1st	2nd	1st	2nd	3rd	3rd	1st	2nd	1st	1st	1st	1st	25
Gabon	×	×	×	×	×	×	×	×	×	×	×	•	•	6th	12th	•	8th	•	9th	11th	9th	11th	5th	8th	9th	11th	9th	12
Ghana											8th																	1
Guinea				8th																				10th	6th	5th	8th	5
Ivory Coast		6th	7th	2nd	6th	6th	6th	6th	5th	5th	6th	8th	7th		10th		7th		12th	10th				14th				17
Kenya																9th						12th		15th	×	15th	15th	5
Libya	×	×	×	×	×	×	×	×	×	×	×	•	•	•	•	11th	•	•	11th	•	12th	9th	•	13th		12th		6
Morocco							8th	5th	4th	7th	4th	4th	5th	4th	4th	6th	3rd	8th	6th	4th	6th	6th	4th	6th	3rd	7th	7th	21
Nigeria	×	×	8th	6th	×	7th	×	×	×	×	×	5th	4th	•	7th	•	10th	6th	7th	•	11th	10th	10th	11th	10th	9th	6th	16
Rwanda																										14th	12th	2
Senegal	3rd	4th				9th	7th		6th	6th	9th				9th	7th				5th	8th			WD	11th			12
South Africa													10th															1
Togo	4th	5th	6th								7th	10th																5
Tunisia	1st	1st	1st	3rd	3rd	2nd	3rd	3rd	3rd	2nd	1st	2nd	1st	3rd	1st	2nd	1st	2nd	1st	1st	2nd	2nd	1st	2nd	4th	3rd	2nd	27
Uganda																											16th	1
Zambia																								16th	13th	16th	14th	4
Total	5	7	9	8	6	9	8	7	7	8	10	10	10	7	12	11	11	8	12	12	12	12	10	16	13	16	16	

== See also ==
- African Men's Junior Handball Championship
- African Men's Youth Handball Championship
- African Handball Champions League
- African Handball Cup Winners' Cup
- African Handball Super Cup
