= Togo men's national handball team =

Togo

Information
- Association: Federation Togolaise de Handball

Colours
1st	2nd

Results

African Championship
- Appearances: 5 (First in 1974)
- Best result: 4th (1974, 1976)
- Last updated on Unknown.

The Togo national handball team is the national handball team of Togo.

== African Championship record ==
- 1974 – 4th place
- 1976 – 4th place
- 1979 – 6th place
- 1994 – 7th place
- 1996 – 10th place
