= El Menzah =

Residential delegation and suburbs in Tunis, Tunisia

El Menzah المنزه
- Delegation / Suburb
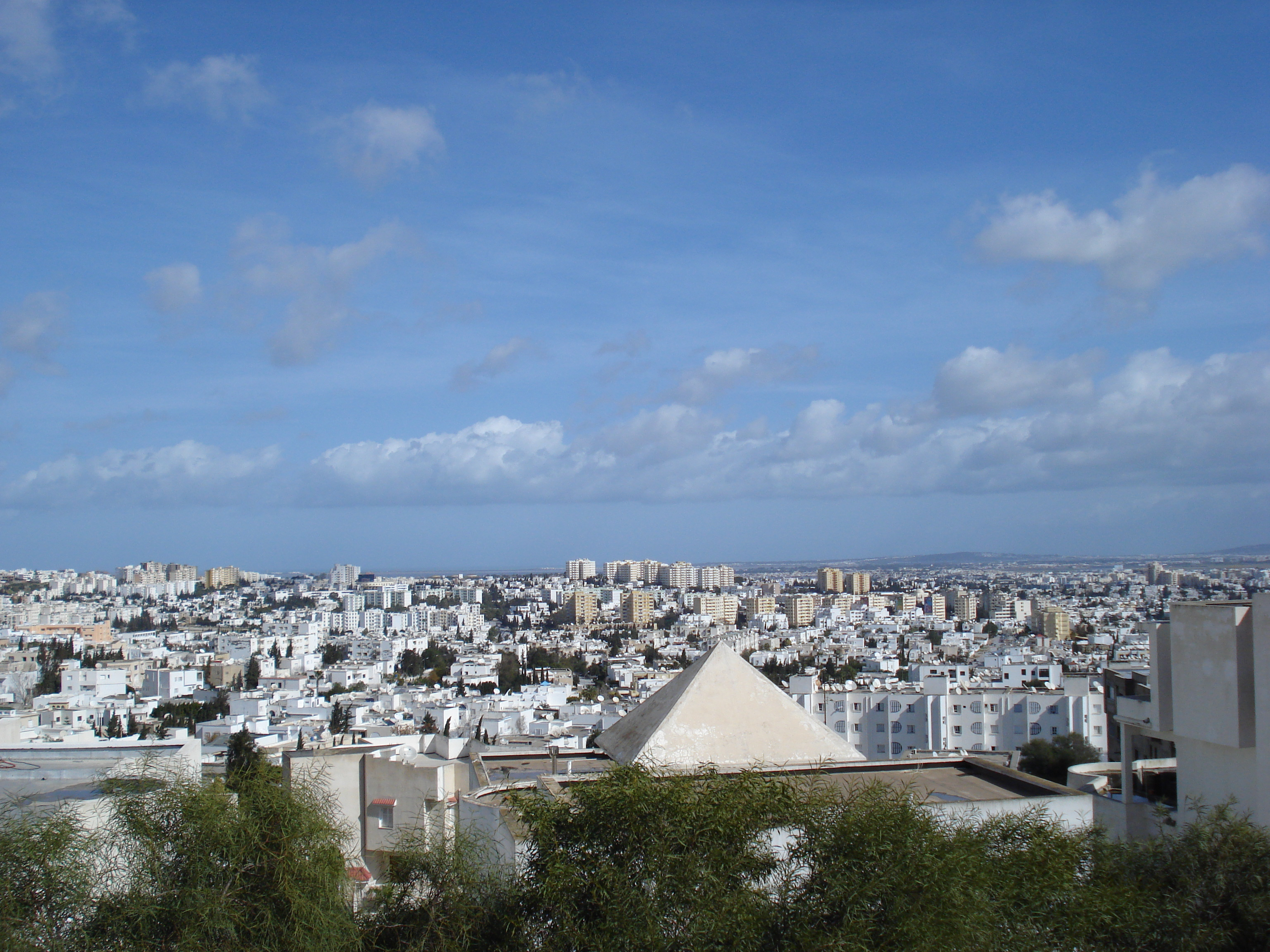
- Sight from the suburbs of El Menzah
- Interactive map of El Menzah
- Country: Tunisia
- Governorate: Tunis; Ariana

Population (2024)
  - Total: 40,738
- Time zone: CET

El Menzah (Arabic: المنزه) is a delegation and group of residential suburbs located north of central Tunis, the capital of Tunisia. Developed primarily after Tunisian independence, it is known for its planned neighborhoods, modernist architecture, and relatively affluent residential character.

The area consists of several numbered subdivisions (El Menzah I–X), developed in stages beginning in the 1950s as part of the northward expansion of Greater Tunis. Some sectors lie administratively within the municipality of Tunis, while others extend into nearby Ariana Governorate.

El Menzah is also home to the Cité olympique d'El Menzah, a major sports complex built for the 1967 Mediterranean Games and centered around the El Menzah Stadium. The district remains one of the most established residential suburbs in northern Tunis and is known for its proximity to universities, diplomatic missions, and major transport routes.

== History ==
The area of El Menzah has its origins in colonial-era sports infrastructure before evolving into a major residential and sporting district north of Tunis.

In 1927, during the French protectorate, the Vélodrome Stadium was built on the site along the road to Ariana. With a capacity of about 5,000 spectators, it became a venue for football, cycling, and other sporting events. The stadium served as home to clubs such as Union sportive tunisienne and Italia de Tunis, hosted matches of the Tunisian national team in the 1930s and 1940s, and staged several Tunisian Cup finals beginning in 1929. Over time, the venue was renamed several times, including Stade Smadja-Borg and later Stade Victor Perez in tribute to the Tunisian boxer who died in Nazi concentration camps during World War II.

Following Tunisia's independence in 1956, the surrounding area began to develop as a planned residential suburb. El Menzah I was among the earliest peri-urban housing projects, with apartment blocks and residential buildings appearing in the mid-1950s.

The district underwent major transformation in the 1960s in preparation for the 1967 Mediterranean Games, held in Tunis from 8 to 17 September 1967. The old Vélodrome was demolished and replaced between 1964 and 1967 by the El Menzah Stadium, built through Tunisian–Bulgarian engineering cooperation. The project formed part of the larger Cité olympique d'El Menzah complex, which also included the Palais des sports and an Olympic swimming pool. The facilities were inaugurated by President Habib Bourguiba and hosted several events during the Games.

Residential expansion continued in the following decades as Greater Tunis grew northward, with additional numbered subdivisions developed mainly during the 1990s and 2000s.

== Description ==
El Menzah was developed as an upscale residential district consisting of planned subdivisions with villas, apartment buildings, and green spaces. The neighborhoods are numbered from I to X according to their development sequence, with El Menzah I established in 1953 and later sections added mainly during the 1990s and 2000s.

Subdivisions II and III were initially designated as such but were later renamed Mutuelleville.

Administratively, El Menzah forms a delegation (mutamadiyah) within Tunis Governorate, although some sectors extend into Ariana Governorate. El Menzah I, IV, and IX lie within the municipality of Tunis, while El Menzah V–VII fall within the municipality of Ariana.

According to the 2024 census, the El Menzah delegation in Tunis Governorate had a population of 40,738, compared with 41,830 in 2014 and 43,320 in 2004.

Additional sectors located in Ariana Governorate, including El Menzah V and VI, bring the broader population of the named subdivisions to roughly 53,000 residents.

== Sport ==
El Menzah is known for the Cité olympique d'El Menzah, a major sports complex developed in the 1960s to host the 1967 Mediterranean Games.

The complex includes several facilities:

- El Menzah Stadium, a multi-purpose stadium with a capacity of approximately 45,000 spectators. Built between 1964 and 1967 on the site of the former Vélodrome Stadium, it features an athletics track and has hosted events including the 1967 Mediterranean Games, the 1994 African Cup of Nations, and domestic football matches for clubs such as Club Africain and Espérance Sportive de Tunis.
- Palais des sports d'El Menzah, an indoor arena with a capacity of around 5,500 spectators. Designed by architect Olivier-Clément Cacoub, it opened in 1967 and hosts basketball, handball, volleyball, and other indoor sporting events.
- An Olympic swimming pool and additional supporting sports facilities built as part of the original complex.

The Cité olympique remains one of Tunisia’s most prominent sporting complexes. As of the mid-2020s, plans have been announced to renovate the stadium and modernize its infrastructure.

== Notable features ==
El Menzah is widely regarded as one of the more affluent residential districts of Greater Tunis, characterized by planned neighborhoods, tree-lined streets, and local amenities.

The suburb is located near the Tunis El Manar University, approximately 3 kilometres away in the neighboring El Manar district, which attracts academics, students, and professionals to the area.

Several mosques serve the local community, including Mosquée El Moez in El Menzah I and Mosquée Er-Rahman in El Menzah VI.

Parts of the district and nearby Mutuelleville host diplomatic missions and residences, contributing to an international presence in the area.

Shopping and entertainment facilities are also accessible nearby, including the modern Tunis City Mall located in Ariana.

== Education ==
The Istituto Scolastico Italiano "Giovan Battista Hodierna", also known as the Scuola Italiana di Tunisi, is a private Italian international school located in El Menzah. It provides education from preschool through upper secondary levels, including the Liceo Scientifico, and follows the Italian national curriculum.

The institution primarily serves the Italian expatriate community in Tunisia while also enrolling local students.

The school is located at 103 Avenue Tahar Ben Ammar, El Menzah 9B, Tunis.

== Gallery ==
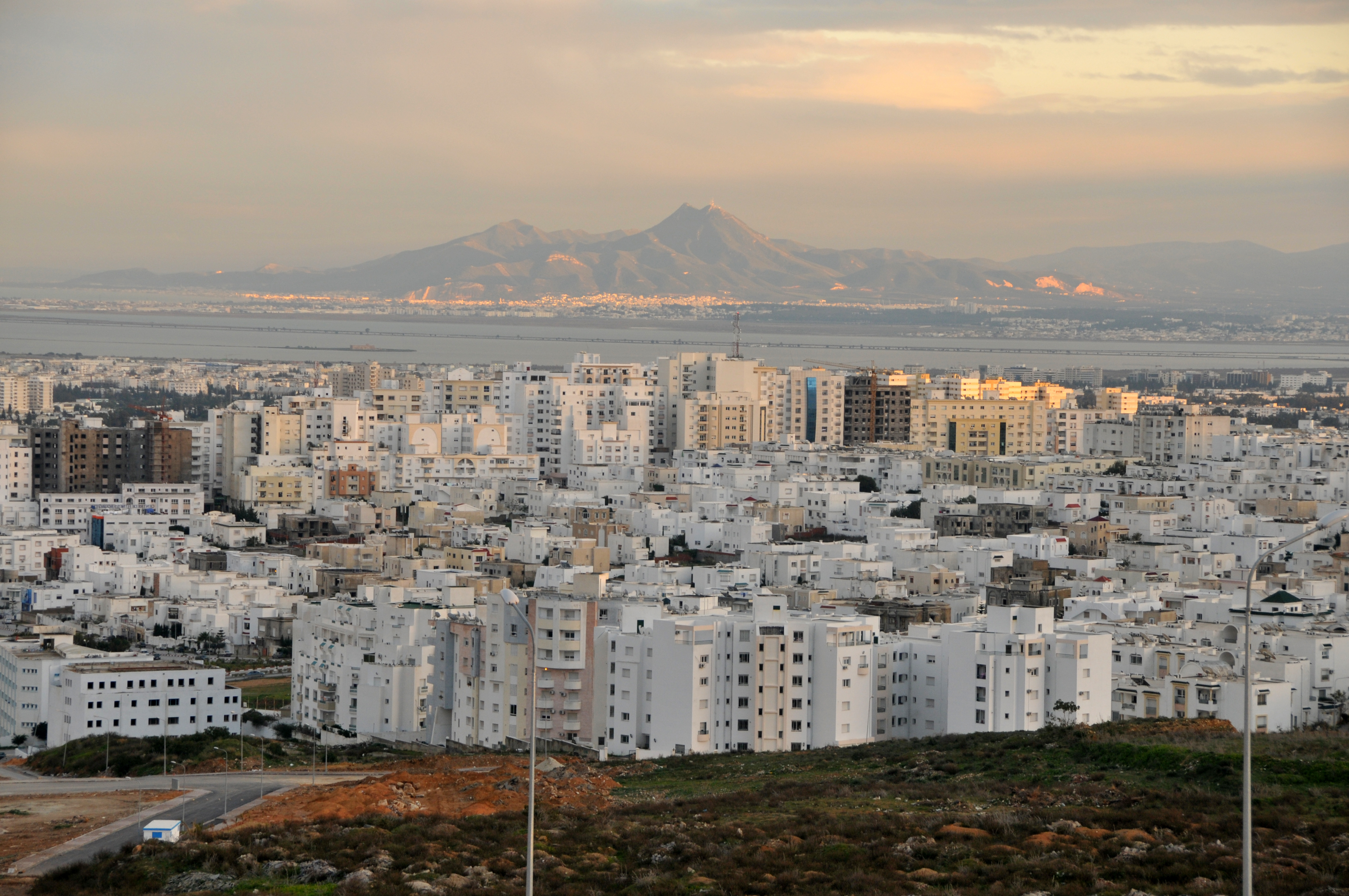
Panoramic view of El Menzah

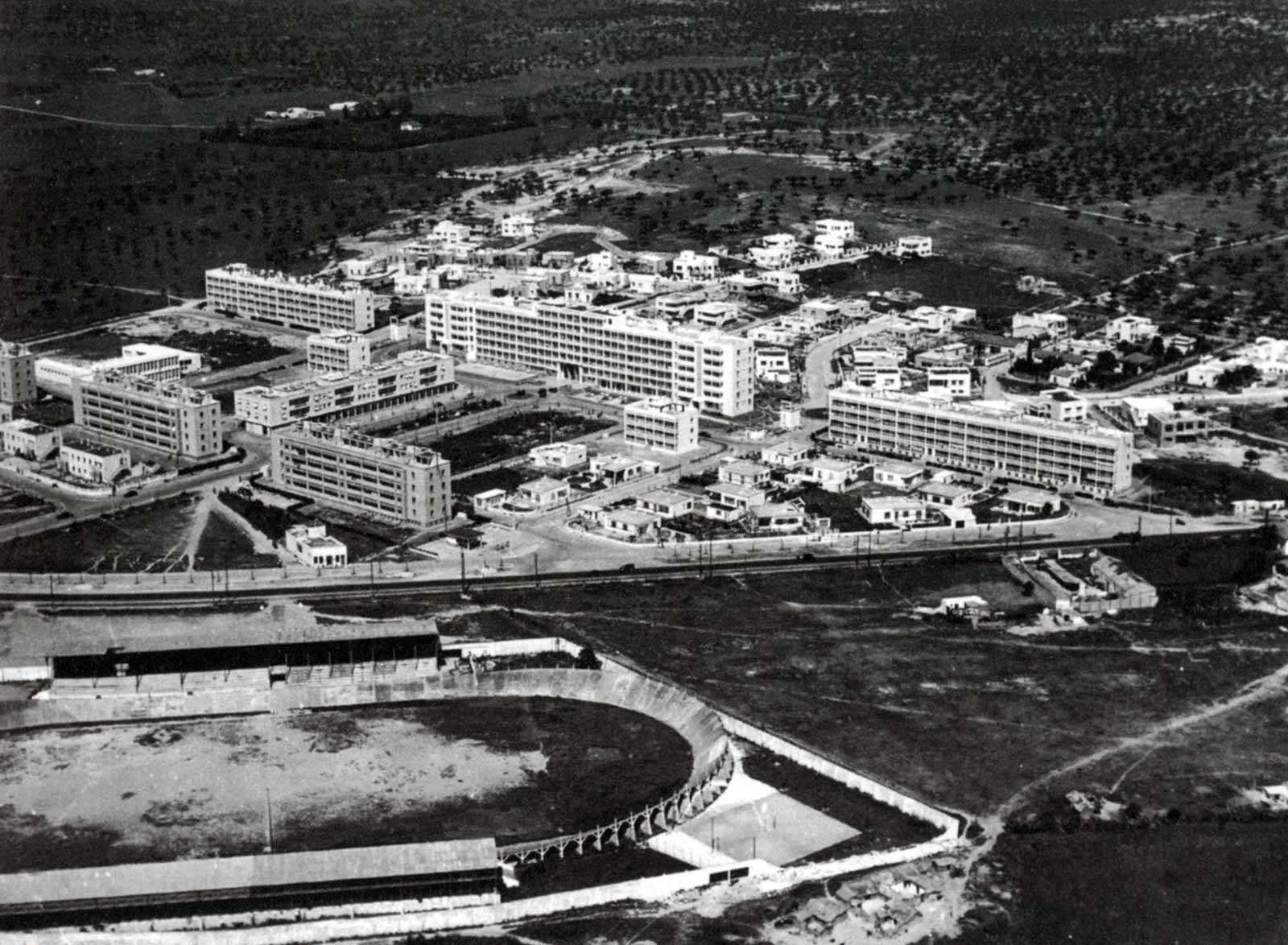
El Menzah I in 1955

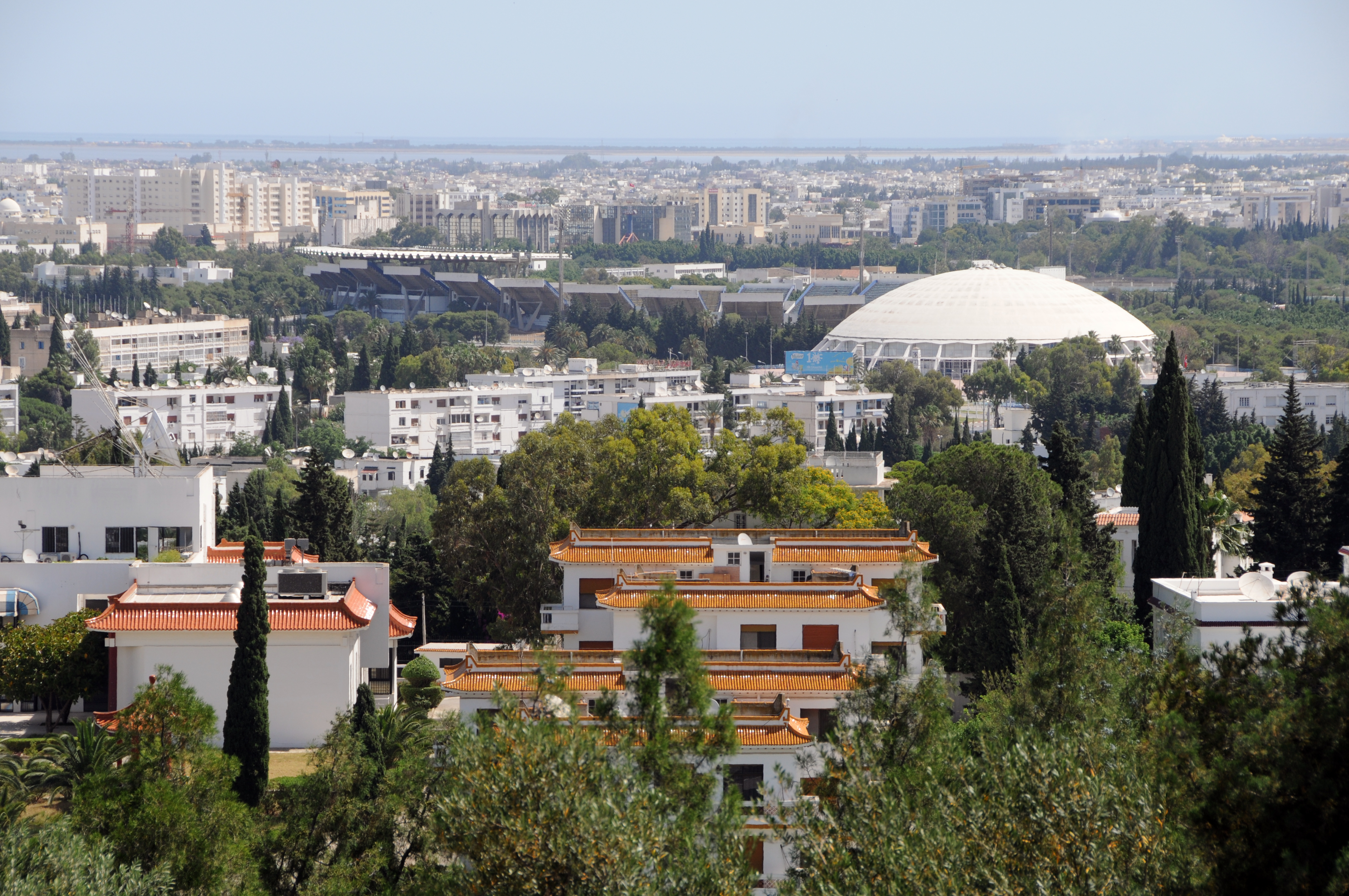
Olympic city of El Menzah

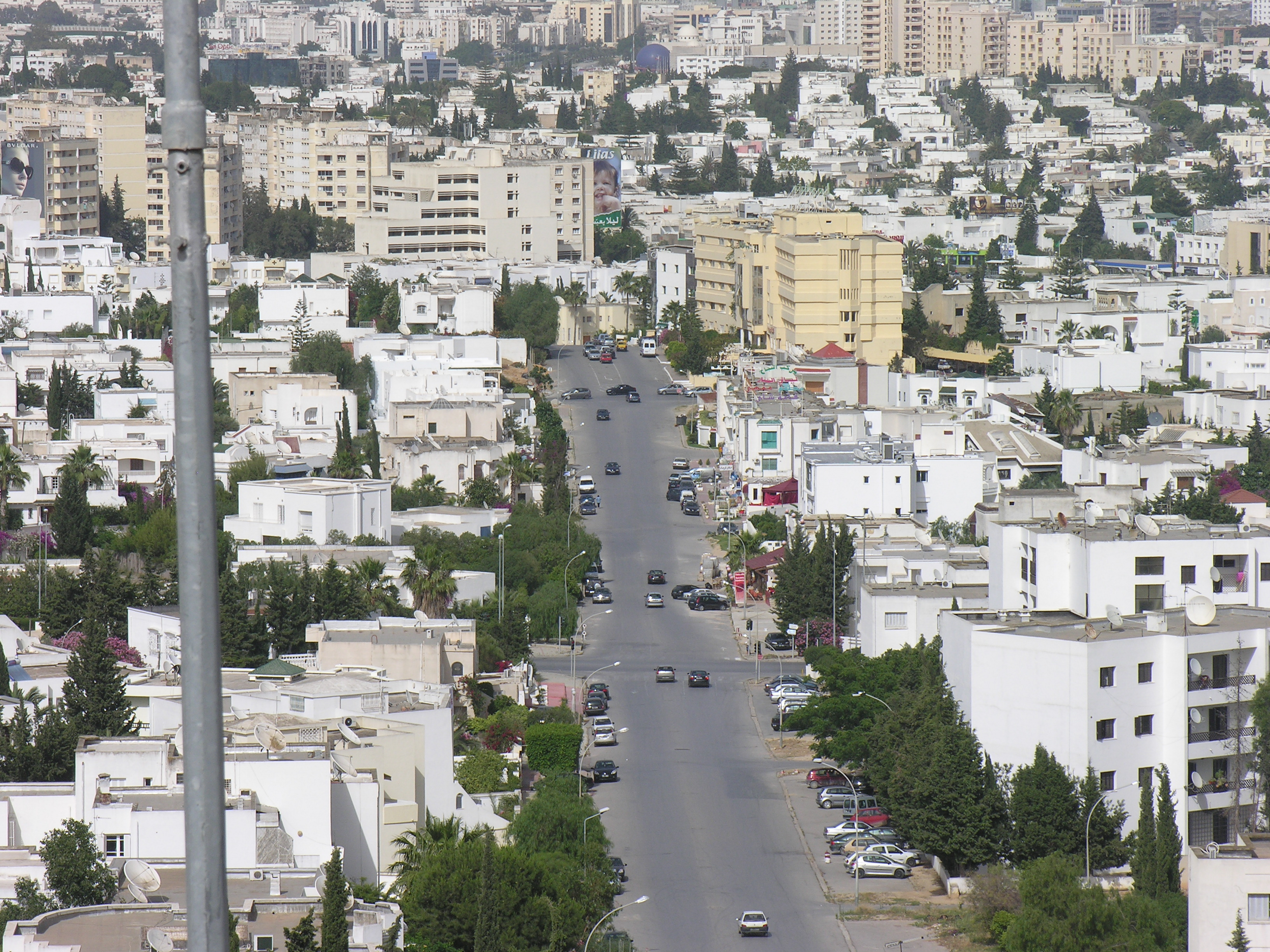
View of El Menzah IX
