= 2026 African Men's Handball Championship =

International handball competition

Tournament details
- Host country: Rwanda
- Venues: 2 (in 1 host city)
- Dates: 21–31 January
- Teams: 16 (from 1 confederation)

Final positions
- Champions: Egypt (10th title)
- Runners-up: Tunisia
- Third place: Cape Verde
- Fourth place: Algeria

Tournament statistics
- Matches played: 56
- Goals scored: 3,308 (59.07 per match)
- Attendance: 34,400 (614 per match)
- Top scorers: (Zambia) Felix Kambundu (49 goals)

The 2026 African Men's Handball Championship was the 27th edition of the African Men's Handball Championship, the biennial international men's handball championship of Africa organized by CAHB. The tournament was held from 21 to 31 January 2026 in Kigali, Rwanda.

It was the first time in history that the championship was organised by Rwanda and the first time that the championship was held in East Africa.

It acted as the African qualifying tournament for the 2027 World Men's Handball Championship in Germany, with the top five nations qualifying.

Egypt were three time defending champions, most recently beating Algeria 29–21 in the 2024 final in Cairo. They defended their title with a win over Tunisia.

== Teams ==
Team	Appearance(s)					Previous best performance (Note: Bold text indicates they hosted that edition.)
Team	Total	First	Last	Streak	2024	Previous best performance
Algeria	26th	1976	2024	26	2nd	Champions (1981, 1983, 1985, 1987, 1989, 1996, 2014)
Angola	20th	1979	2024	13	8th	Third place (2004, 2014, 2016)
Benin	2nd	1996		1	N/A	Ninth place (1996)
Cameroon	19th	1974	2024	13	10th	Runners-up (1974)
Cape Verde	4th	2020	2024	4	4th	Runners-up (2022)
Congo	22nd	1979	2024	2	13th	Runners-up (1983)
Egypt	25th	1979	2024	26	1st	Champions (1991, 1992, 2000, 2004, 2008, 2016, 2020, 2022, 2024)
Gabon	12th	2000	2024	8	11th	Fifth place (2018)
Guinea	5th	1981	2024	4	5th	Fifth place (2024)
Kenya	5th	2004	2024	2	15th	Ninth place (2004)
Morocco	21st	1987	2024	21	7th	Third place (2006, 2022)
Nigeria	16th	1979	2024	7	9th	Fourth place (1998)
Rwanda (H)	2nd	2024	2024	2	14th	Fourteenth place (2024)
Tunisia	27th	1974	2024	27	3rd	Champions (1974, 1976, 1979, 1994, 1998, 2002, 2006, 2010, 2012, 2018)
Uganda	1st	Debut				
Zambia	4th	2020	2024	4	16th	Thirteenth place (2022)

== Venues ==
The tournament will be played in Kigali across two venues.

- The main venue is the BK Arena. Built in 2019, the venue previously hosted the 2021 AfroBasket, 2021 Men's and Women's African Volleyball Championship, 2023 Women's Afrobasket and final rounds of the Basketball Africa League.
- The secondary arena is the Petit Stade. Built in the 1980s but significantly renovated in 2024, the venue hosts numerous indoor sports games in the country's domestic leagues.

Kigali	2026 African Men's Handball Championship is located in Rwanda	Kigali
BK Arena	2026 African Men's Handball Championship is located in Rwanda	Petit Stade
Capacity: 10,000	2026 African Men's Handball Championship is located in Rwanda	Capacity: 1,000

== Draw ==
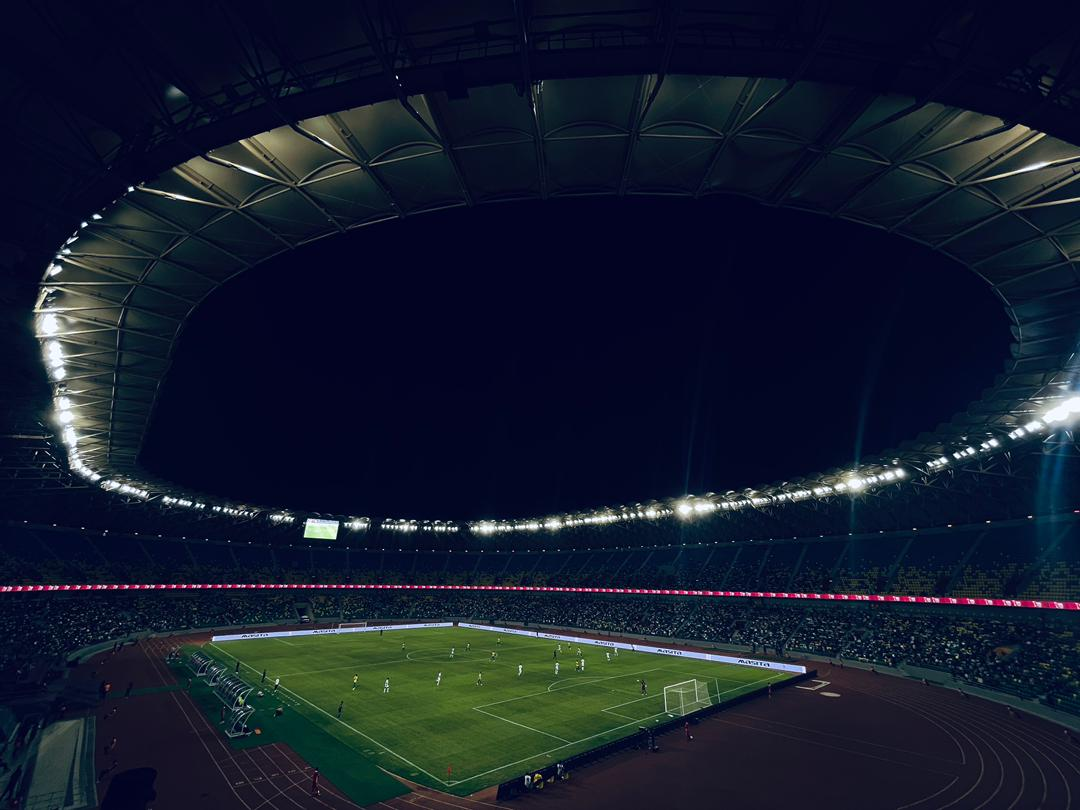
The Amahoro Stadium in Kigali hosted the draw.

The draw was held at 17:30 UTC+02:00 on 14 November 2025 at the Amahoro Stadium, Kigali, Rwanda. The draw started with, in order, pots 4, 3, 2 and 1 being drawn, with each team selected then allocated into the first available group alphabetically.

=== Seeding ===
Pot 1	Pot 2	Pot 3	Pot 4
Egypt; Algeria; Tunisia; Cape Verde	Guinea; Angola; Morocco; Nigeria	Cameroon; Gabon; Congo; Rwanda	Benin; Kenya; Zambia; Uganda

=== Draw results ===
Group A
Pos	Team
A1	Algeria
A2	Nigeria
A3	Rwanda (H)
A4	Zambia

Group B
Pos	Team
B1	Egypt
B2	Angola
B3	Gabon
B4	Uganda

Group C
Pos	Team
C1	Tunisia
C2	Guinea
C3	Cameroon
C4	Kenya

Group D
Pos	Team
D1	Cape Verde
D2	Morocco
D3	Congo
D4	Benin

=== Schedule ===
Schedule
Round	Matchday	Date
Preliminary round	Matchday 1	21 January 2026
Preliminary round	Matchday 2	22 January 2026
Preliminary round	Matchday 3	24 January 2026
President's Cup	Matchday 4	25 January 2026
President's Cup	Matchday 5	27 January 2026
President's Cup	Matchday 6	29 January 2026
President's Cup	Ranking games	30 January 2026
Main round	Matchday 4	25 January 2026
Main round	Matchday 5	27 January 2026
5–8 placement bracket	5–8 semi-finals	29 January 2026
5–8 placement bracket	Seventh place game	30 January 2026
5–8 placement bracket	Fifth place game	31 January 2026
Knockout stage	Semi-finals	29 January 2026
Knockout stage	Final	31 January 2026

== Preliminary round ==
All times are local (UTC+2).

=== Tiebreakers ===
In the group stage, teams are ranked according to points (2 points for a win, 1 point for a draw, 0 points for a loss). After completion of the group stage, if two or more teams have the same number of points, the ranking will be determined as follows:

1. Highest number of points in matches between the teams directly involved;
2. Superior goal difference in matches between the teams directly involved;
3. Highest number of goals scored in matches between the teams directly involved;
4. Superior goal difference in all matches of the group;
5. Highest number of plus goals in all matches of the group;

If the ranking of one of these teams is determined, the above criteria are consecutively followed until the ranking of all teams is determined. If no ranking can be determined, a decision shall be obtained by CAHB through drawing of lots.

=== Group A ===
Pos	Team	Pld	W	D	L	GF	GA	GD	Pts	Qualification
1	Nigeria	3	3	0	0	91	61	+30	6	Main round
2	Algeria	3	2	0	1	106	71	+35	4	Main round
3	Rwanda (H)	3	1	0	2	75	95	−20	2	President Cup
4	Zambia	3	0	0	3	58	103	−45	0	President Cup

Source: IHF
Rules for classification: 1) points; 2) head-to-head points; 3) head-to-head goal difference; 4) head-to-head number of goals scored; 5) goal difference.
(H) Hosts

21 January 2026; 13:00	Algeria	23–25	Nigeria	Petit Stade, Kigali; Attendance: 100; Referees: Faye, Diop (SEN)
21 January 2026; 13:00	Abdi 7	(13–16)	Salami 6	Petit Stade, Kigali; Attendance: 100; Referees: Faye, Diop (SEN)
21 January 2026; 13:00	2× (yellow card) 5× (suspension)	Report	1× (yellow card) 4× (suspension)	Petit Stade, Kigali; Attendance: 100; Referees: Faye, Diop (SEN)

21 January 2026; 20:00	Rwanda	30–19	Zambia	BK Arena, Kigali; Attendance: 5,000; Referees: Kamal, Mohamed (EGY)
21 January 2026; 20:00	Kayijamahe 10	(17–8)	Syakwayi 6	BK Arena, Kigali; Attendance: 5,000; Referees: Kamal, Mohamed (EGY)
21 January 2026; 20:00	1× (yellow card) 1× (suspension)	Report	3× (suspension)	BK Arena, Kigali; Attendance: 5,000; Referees: Kamal, Mohamed (EGY)

22 January 2026; 17:00	Nigeria	36–18	Zambia	Petit Stade, Kigali; Attendance: 500; Referees: Moqriich, El Ghass (MAR)
22 January 2026; 17:00	Sulaimon 8	(17–10)	Kambundu 7	Petit Stade, Kigali; Attendance: 500; Referees: Moqriich, El Ghass (MAR)
22 January 2026; 17:00	2× (suspension)	Report	1× (yellow card) 2× (suspension)	Petit Stade, Kigali; Attendance: 500; Referees: Moqriich, El Ghass (MAR)

22 January 2026; 19:00	Algeria	46–25	Rwanda	BK Arena, Kigali; Attendance: 2,000; Referees: El-Saied, El-Saied (EGY)
22 January 2026; 19:00	Daoud, Guemeida 8	(23–10)	Emmanuel 8	BK Arena, Kigali; Attendance: 2,000; Referees: El-Saied, El-Saied (EGY)
22 January 2026; 19:00	1× (suspension)	Report	1× (yellow card) 3× (suspension)	BK Arena, Kigali; Attendance: 2,000; Referees: El-Saied, El-Saied (EGY)

24 January 2026; 15:00	Zambia	21–37	Algeria	Petit Stade, Kigali; Attendance: 500; Referees: Suamila, Amodu (NGR)
24 January 2026; 15:00	Kambundu 7	(9–19)	Mahdi 6	Petit Stade, Kigali; Attendance: 500; Referees: Suamila, Amodu (NGR)
24 January 2026; 15:00	3× (suspension)	Report	2× (suspension)	Petit Stade, Kigali; Attendance: 500; Referees: Suamila, Amodu (NGR)

24 January 2026; 19:00	Nigeria	30–20	Rwanda	BK Arena, Kigali; Attendance: 4,500; Referees: Mitrović, Vešović (MNE)
24 January 2026; 19:00	Salami 8	(14–10)	Kayijamahe 11	BK Arena, Kigali; Attendance: 4,500; Referees: Mitrović, Vešović (MNE)
24 January 2026; 19:00	1× (yellow card) 3× (suspension)	Report	7× (suspension) 1× (red card)	BK Arena, Kigali; Attendance: 4,500; Referees: Mitrović, Vešović (MNE)

=== Group B ===
Pos	Team	Pld	W	D	L	GF	GA	GD	Pts	Qualification
1	Egypt	3	3	0	0	131	66	+65	6	Main round
2	Angola	3	2	0	1	98	83	+15	4	Main round
3	Gabon	3	1	0	2	79	85	−6	2	President Cup
4	Uganda	3	0	0	3	50	124	−74	0	President Cup

Source: IHF
Rules for classification: 1) points; 2) head-to-head points; 3) head-to-head goal difference; 4) head-to-head number of goals scored; 5) goal difference.

21 January 2026; 11:00	Angola	37–21	Uganda	BK Arena, Kigali; Attendance: 100; Referees: Yapo, Koné (CIV)
21 January 2026; 11:00	Sousa 8	(15–11)	Lam 9	BK Arena, Kigali; Attendance: 100; Referees: Yapo, Koné (CIV)
21 January 2026; 11:00	1× (yellow card) 3× (suspension)	Report	5× (suspension)	BK Arena, Kigali; Attendance: 100; Referees: Yapo, Koné (CIV)

21 January 2026; 12:30	Egypt	36–25	Gabon	Petit Stade, Kigali; Attendance: 200; Referees: Gasmi, Gasmi (FRA)
21 January 2026; 12:30	Yosri 9	(19–14)	Aubyang 5	Petit Stade, Kigali; Attendance: 200; Referees: Gasmi, Gasmi (FRA)
21 January 2026; 12:30	3× (suspension)	Report	2× (suspension)	Petit Stade, Kigali; Attendance: 200; Referees: Gasmi, Gasmi (FRA)

22 January 2026; 13:00	Gabon	33–16	Uganda	Petit Stade, Kigali; Attendance: 500; Referees: Amodu, Sumaila (NGR)
22 January 2026; 13:00	Wora 8	(17–6)	Lukwago 5	Petit Stade, Kigali; Attendance: 500; Referees: Amodu, Sumaila (NGR)
22 January 2026; 13:00	3× (suspension)	Report	4× (suspension) 1× (red card)	Petit Stade, Kigali; Attendance: 500; Referees: Amodu, Sumaila (NGR)

22 January 2026; 15:00	Egypt	41–28	Angola	BK Arena, Kigali; Attendance: 200; Referees: Belkhiri, Hamidi (ALG)
22 January 2026; 15:00	Omar, Nafea 7	(18–13)	Chicola 6	BK Arena, Kigali; Attendance: 200; Referees: Belkhiri, Hamidi (ALG)
22 January 2026; 15:00	4× (suspension)	Report	6× (suspension) 1× (red card)	BK Arena, Kigali; Attendance: 200; Referees: Belkhiri, Hamidi (ALG)

24 January 2026; 13:00	Uganda	13–54	Egypt	Petit Stade, Kigali; Attendance: 200; Referees: Yapo, Koné (CIV)
24 January 2026; 13:00	Okolimong 4	(5–27)	Emad 10	Petit Stade, Kigali; Attendance: 200; Referees: Yapo, Koné (CIV)
24 January 2026; 13:00	4× (suspension)	Report	2× (suspension)	Petit Stade, Kigali; Attendance: 200; Referees: Yapo, Koné (CIV)

24 January 2026; 17:00	Angola	33–21	Gabon	BK Arena, Kigali; Attendance: 500; Referees: Faye, Diop (SEN)
24 January 2026; 17:00	Sebastião 5	(19–8)	Nguema 5	BK Arena, Kigali; Attendance: 500; Referees: Faye, Diop (SEN)
24 January 2026; 17:00	3× (suspension)	Report	3× (suspension) 1× (red card)	BK Arena, Kigali; Attendance: 500; Referees: Faye, Diop (SEN)

=== Group C ===
Pos	Team	Pld	W	D	L	GF	GA	GD	Pts	Qualification
1	Tunisia	3	3	0	0	115	68	+47	6	Main round
2	Guinea	3	2	0	1	85	80	+5	4	Main round
3	Cameroon	3	1	0	2	68	89	−21	2	President Cup
4	Kenya	3	0	0	3	72	103	−31	0	President Cup

Source: IHF
Rules for classification: 1) points; 2) head-to-head points; 3) head-to-head goal difference; 4) head-to-head number of goals scored; 5) goal difference.

21 January 2026; 10:30	Guinea	36–27	Kenya	Petit Stade, Kigali; Attendance: 100; Referees: Abunakar, Salihu (NGR)
21 January 2026; 10:30	Paquiom 16	(15–11)	Collins, Chiunda 6	Petit Stade, Kigali; Attendance: 100; Referees: Abunakar, Salihu (NGR)
21 January 2026; 10:30	2× (suspension)	Report	1× (yellow card) 6× (suspension)	Petit Stade, Kigali; Attendance: 100; Referees: Abunakar, Salihu (NGR)

21 January 2026; 15:00	Tunisia	41–22	Cameroon	BK Arena, Kigali; Attendance: 200; Referees: Mitrović, Vešović (MNE)
21 January 2026; 15:00	Toumi 6	(23–7)	Ondoua 4	BK Arena, Kigali; Attendance: 200; Referees: Mitrović, Vešović (MNE)
21 January 2026; 15:00	5× (suspension)	Report	2× (yellow card) 7× (suspension) 2× (red card)	BK Arena, Kigali; Attendance: 200; Referees: Mitrović, Vešović (MNE)

22 January 2026; 11:00	Cameroon	28–24	Kenya	BK Arena, Kigali; Attendance: 100; Referees: Ben Dahou, Zoghlami (TUN)
22 January 2026; 11:00	Bi Ndjee, Deen 7	(13–12)	Mayende 8	BK Arena, Kigali; Attendance: 100; Referees: Ben Dahou, Zoghlami (TUN)
22 January 2026; 11:00	4× (suspension)	Report	8× (suspension)	BK Arena, Kigali; Attendance: 100; Referees: Ben Dahou, Zoghlami (TUN)

22 January 2026; 17:00	Tunisia	35–25	Guinea	BK Arena, Kigali; Attendance: 500; Referees: Faye, Diop (SEN)
22 January 2026; 17:00	Jbeli, Kallel 5	(17–14)	Gory, Paquiom 5	BK Arena, Kigali; Attendance: 500; Referees: Faye, Diop (SEN)
22 January 2026; 17:00	5× (suspension)	Report	7× (suspension) 1× (red card)	BK Arena, Kigali; Attendance: 500; Referees: Faye, Diop (SEN)

24 January 2026; 17:00	Kenya	21–39	Tunisia	Petit Stade, Kigali; Attendance: 3,000; Referees: Moqriich, El Ghass (MAR)
24 January 2026; 17:00	Mayende 5	(11–20)	Ben Salem 7	Petit Stade, Kigali; Attendance: 3,000; Referees: Moqriich, El Ghass (MAR)
24 January 2026; 17:00	3× (suspension) 1× (red card)	Report	2× (suspension)	Petit Stade, Kigali; Attendance: 3,000; Referees: Moqriich, El Ghass (MAR)

24 January 2026; 19:00	Guinea	24–18	Cameroon	Petit Stade, Kigali; Attendance: 500; Referees: Belkhiri, Hamidi (ALG)
24 January 2026; 19:00	Paquiom 5	(12–7)	Tohmuloh 4	Petit Stade, Kigali; Attendance: 500; Referees: Belkhiri, Hamidi (ALG)
24 January 2026; 19:00	6× (suspension)	Report	1× (yellow card) 4× (suspension)	Petit Stade, Kigali; Attendance: 500; Referees: Belkhiri, Hamidi (ALG)

=== Group D ===
Pos	Team	Pld	W	D	L	GF	GA	GD	Pts	Qualification
1	Cape Verde	3	3	0	0	99	80	+19	6	Main round
2	Morocco	3	2	0	1	119	92	+27	4	Main round
3	Congo	3	1	0	2	85	95	−10	2	President Cup
4	Benin	3	0	0	3	74	110	−36	0	President Cup

Source: IHF
Rules for classification: 1) points; 2) head-to-head points; 3) head-to-head goal difference; 4) head-to-head number of goals scored; 5) goal difference.

21 January 2026; 14:30	Morocco	52–28	Benin	Petit Stade, Kigali; Attendance: 100; Referees: El-Saied, El-Saied (EGY)
21 January 2026; 14:30	Rezzouki 10	(27–10)	Ganiou 6	Petit Stade, Kigali; Attendance: 100; Referees: El-Saied, El-Saied (EGY)
21 January 2026; 14:30	1× (suspension)	Report	3× (suspension)	Petit Stade, Kigali; Attendance: 100; Referees: El-Saied, El-Saied (EGY)

21 January 2026; 16:30	Cape Verde	34–28	Congo	Petit Stade, Kigali; Attendance: 500; Referees: Ben Dahou, Zoghlami (TUN)
21 January 2026; 16:30	four players 5	(21–16)	Naal 8	Petit Stade, Kigali; Attendance: 500; Referees: Ben Dahou, Zoghlami (TUN)
21 January 2026; 16:30	1× (yellow card) 1× (suspension) 1× (red card)	Report	1× (yellow card) 4× (suspension)	Petit Stade, Kigali; Attendance: 500; Referees: Ben Dahou, Zoghlami (TUN)

22 January 2026; 13:00	Cape Verde	33–28	Morocco	BK Arena, Kigali; Attendance: 100; Referees: Mitrović, Vešović (MNE)
22 January 2026; 13:00	Pina 13	(13–17)	Ezzine, Saa 6	BK Arena, Kigali; Attendance: 100; Referees: Mitrović, Vešović (MNE)
22 January 2026; 13:00	1× (yellow card) 5× (suspension) 1× (red card)	Report	1× (yellow card) 1× (suspension)	BK Arena, Kigali; Attendance: 100; Referees: Mitrović, Vešović (MNE)

22 January 2026; 15:00	Congo	26–22	Benin	Petit Stade, Kigali; Attendance: 500; Referees: Yapo, Koné (CIV)
22 January 2026; 15:00	Naal 6	(14–9)	Sossou 5	Petit Stade, Kigali; Attendance: 500; Referees: Yapo, Koné (CIV)
22 January 2026; 15:00	1× (yellow card) 3× (suspension)	Report	1× (suspension)	Petit Stade, Kigali; Attendance: 500; Referees: Yapo, Koné (CIV)

24 January 2026; 11:00	Benin	24–32	Cape Verde	BK Arena, Kigali; Attendance: 200; Referees: Kamal, Mohamed (EGY)
24 January 2026; 11:00	Sossou 7	(11–14)	Pereira 8	BK Arena, Kigali; Attendance: 200; Referees: Kamal, Mohamed (EGY)
24 January 2026; 11:00	2× (suspension)	Report		BK Arena, Kigali; Attendance: 200; Referees: Kamal, Mohamed (EGY)

24 January 2026; 15:00	Morocco	39–31	Congo	BK Arena, Kigali; Attendance: 500; Referees: Ben Dahou, Zoghlami (TUN)
24 January 2026; 15:00	Saa 8	(16–12)	Lekiby-Elila 8	BK Arena, Kigali; Attendance: 500; Referees: Ben Dahou, Zoghlami (TUN)
24 January 2026; 15:00	7× (suspension) 2× (red card)	Report	1× (yellow card) 5× (suspension)	BK Arena, Kigali; Attendance: 500; Referees: Ben Dahou, Zoghlami (TUN)

== President Cup ==
=== Group I ===
Pos	Team	Pld	W	D	L	GF	GA	GD	Pts	Qualification
1	Gabon	3	3	0	0	108	63	+45	6	Ninth place game
2	Rwanda (H)	3	2	0	1	99	85	+14	4	Eleventh place game
3	Zambia	3	1	0	2	73	100	−27	2	13th place game
4	Uganda	3	0	0	3	76	108	−32	0	15th place game

Source: IHF
Rules for classification: 1) points; 2) head-to-head points; 3) head-to-head goal difference; 4) head-to-head number of goals scored; 5) goal difference.
(H) Hosts

25 January 2026; 11:30	Rwanda	37–27	Uganda	Petit Stade, Kigali; Attendance: 500; Referees: Moqriich, El Ghass (MAR)
25 January 2026; 11:30	Mbesutunguwe 10	(16–13)	three players 5	Petit Stade, Kigali; Attendance: 500; Referees: Moqriich, El Ghass (MAR)
25 January 2026; 11:30	6× (suspension)	Report	4× (suspension)	Petit Stade, Kigali; Attendance: 500; Referees: Moqriich, El Ghass (MAR)

25 January 2026; 16:30	Gabon	36–16	Zambia	Petit Stade, Kigali; Attendance: 500; Referees: Tuyizere, Imanimbahafi (RWA)
25 January 2026; 16:30	Tabanguet 10	(14–8)	Kambundu 8	Petit Stade, Kigali; Attendance: 500; Referees: Tuyizere, Imanimbahafi (RWA)
25 January 2026; 16:30	3× (suspension)	Report	3× (suspension)	Petit Stade, Kigali; Attendance: 500; Referees: Tuyizere, Imanimbahafi (RWA)

27 January 2026; 14:00	Rwanda	34–26	Zambia	BK Arena, Kigali; Attendance: 350; Referees: Amodu, Sumaila (NIG)
27 January 2026; 14:00	Mbesutunguwe 7	(17–17)	Kambundu 11	BK Arena, Kigali; Attendance: 350; Referees: Amodu, Sumaila (NIG)
27 January 2026; 14:00	4× (suspension)	Report	1× (yellow card) 4× (suspension)	BK Arena, Kigali; Attendance: 350; Referees: Amodu, Sumaila (NIG)

27 January 2026; 14:00	Gabon	40–19	Uganda	Petit Stade, Kigali; Attendance: 500; Referees: Yapo, Koné (CIV)
27 January 2026; 14:00	Moure, Tabanguet 6	(23–10)	Umar 3	Petit Stade, Kigali; Attendance: 500; Referees: Yapo, Koné (CIV)
27 January 2026; 14:00	1× (suspension)	Report	1× (yellow card) 3× (suspension)	Petit Stade, Kigali; Attendance: 500; Referees: Yapo, Koné (CIV)

29 January 2026; 10:00	Zambia	31–30	Uganda	Petit Stade, Kigali; Attendance: 300; Referees: Tuyizere, Imanimbahafi (RWA)
29 January 2026; 10:00	Audriscal 6	(15–18)	Muzay 9	Petit Stade, Kigali; Attendance: 300; Referees: Tuyizere, Imanimbahafi (RWA)
29 January 2026; 10:00	4× (suspension)	Report	3× (suspension)	Petit Stade, Kigali; Attendance: 300; Referees: Tuyizere, Imanimbahafi (RWA)

29 January 2026; 14:00	Rwanda	28–32	Gabon	Petit Stade, Kigali; Attendance: 500; Referees: Moqriich, El Ghass (MAR)
29 January 2026; 14:00	Kayijamahe 6	(18–14)	Tabanguet 10	Petit Stade, Kigali; Attendance: 500; Referees: Moqriich, El Ghass (MAR)
29 January 2026; 14:00	1× (yellow card) 4× (suspension)	Report	1× (suspension)	Petit Stade, Kigali; Attendance: 500; Referees: Moqriich, El Ghass (MAR)

=== Group II ===
Pos	Team	Pld	W	D	L	GF	GA	GD	Pts	Qualification
1	Cameroon	3	3	0	0	99	76	+23	6	Ninth place game
2	Congo	3	1	1	1	91	81	+10	3	Eleventh place game
3	Benin	3	1	1	1	87	91	−4	3	13th place game
4	Kenya	3	0	0	3	78	107	−29	0	15th place game

Source: IHF
Rules for classification: 1) points; 2) head-to-head points; 3) head-to-head goal difference; 4) head-to-head number of goals scored; 5) goal difference.

25 January 2026; 14:00	Cameroon	34–27	Benin	Petit Stade, Kigali; Attendance: 100; Referees: Faye, Diop (SEN)
25 January 2026; 14:00	three players 6	(18–11)	Abdou 6	Petit Stade, Kigali; Attendance: 100; Referees: Faye, Diop (SEN)
25 January 2026; 14:00	2× (yellow card) 3× (suspension)	Report	1× (yellow card) 7× (suspension)	Petit Stade, Kigali; Attendance: 100; Referees: Faye, Diop (SEN)

25 January 2026; 19:00	Congo	37–26	Kenya	Petit Stade, Kigali; Attendance: 500; Referees: Kamal, Mohamed (EGY)
25 January 2026; 19:00	Kouba 13	(20–8)	Mayende, Wamalwa 6	Petit Stade, Kigali; Attendance: 500; Referees: Kamal, Mohamed (EGY)
25 January 2026; 19:00	6× (suspension)	Report	2× (suspension) 1× (red card)	Petit Stade, Kigali; Attendance: 500; Referees: Kamal, Mohamed (EGY)

27 January 2026; 11:30	Cameroon	37–22	Kenya	Petit Stade, Kigali; Attendance: 500; Referees: Tuyizere, Imanimbahafi (RWA)
27 January 2026; 11:30	Deen 8	(15–9)	Wakhuka 6	Petit Stade, Kigali; Attendance: 500; Referees: Tuyizere, Imanimbahafi (RWA)
27 January 2026; 11:30	5× (suspension)	Report	3× (suspension)	Petit Stade, Kigali; Attendance: 500; Referees: Tuyizere, Imanimbahafi (RWA)

27 January 2026; 16:30	Congo	27–27	Benin	Petit Stade, Kigali; Attendance: 500; Referees: Moqriich, El Ghass (MAR)
27 January 2026; 16:30	Lekiby-Elila 5	(16–13)	Valot, Vermont 5	Petit Stade, Kigali; Attendance: 500; Referees: Moqriich, El Ghass (MAR)
27 January 2026; 16:30	1× (yellow card) 2× (suspension)	Report	2× (yellow card) 2× (suspension)	Petit Stade, Kigali; Attendance: 500; Referees: Moqriich, El Ghass (MAR)

29 January 2026; 12:00	Kenya	30–33	Benin	Petit Stade, Kigali; Attendance: 500; Referees: Makrem, Rochdi (TUN)
29 January 2026; 12:00	Collins 7	(17–16)	Sokegbe 7	Petit Stade, Kigali; Attendance: 500; Referees: Makrem, Rochdi (TUN)
29 January 2026; 12:00	5× (suspension)	Report	5× (suspension)	Petit Stade, Kigali; Attendance: 500; Referees: Makrem, Rochdi (TUN)

29 January 2026; 16:00	Cameroon	28–27	Congo	Petit Stade, Kigali; Attendance: 500; Referees: Gasmi, Gasmi (FRA)
29 January 2026; 16:00	Adjeng 8	(14–14)	Lekiby-Elila 8	Petit Stade, Kigali; Attendance: 500; Referees: Gasmi, Gasmi (FRA)
29 January 2026; 16:00	4× (suspension)	Report	1× (yellow card) 5× (suspension)	Petit Stade, Kigali; Attendance: 500; Referees: Gasmi, Gasmi (FRA)

=== 15th place game ===
30 January 2026; 10:00	Uganda	29–35	Kenya	Petit Stade, Kigali; Attendance: 500; Referees: Sumaila, Amodu (NIG)
30 January 2026; 10:00	Lukwago 5	(15–17)	Mayende 9	Petit Stade, Kigali; Attendance: 500; Referees: Sumaila, Amodu (NIG)
30 January 2026; 10:00	3× (suspension)	Report	3× (suspension)	Petit Stade, Kigali; Attendance: 500; Referees: Sumaila, Amodu (NIG)

=== 13th place game ===
30 January 2026; 12:00	Zambia	25–42	Benin	Petit Stade, Kigali; Attendance: 500; Referees: Kamal, Mohamed (EGY)
30 January 2026; 12:00	Kambundu 11	(11–22)	Sossou 8	Petit Stade, Kigali; Attendance: 500; Referees: Kamal, Mohamed (EGY)
30 January 2026; 12:00	3× (suspension)	Report	1× (suspension)	Petit Stade, Kigali; Attendance: 500; Referees: Kamal, Mohamed (EGY)

=== Eleventh place game ===
30 January 2026; 10:00	Rwanda	28–30	Congo	BK Arena, Kigali; Attendance: 500; Referees: Yapo, Koné (CIV)
30 January 2026; 10:00	Kayijamahe 7	(16–16)	Zoko-Ezo 7	BK Arena, Kigali; Attendance: 500; Referees: Yapo, Koné (CIV)
30 January 2026; 10:00	5× (suspension)	Report	1× (yellow card) 2× (suspension)	BK Arena, Kigali; Attendance: 500; Referees: Yapo, Koné (CIV)

=== Ninth place game ===
30 January 2026; 14:00	Gabon	29–27	Cameroon	BK Arena, Kigali; Attendance: 500; Referees: Moqriich, El Gahss (MAR)
30 January 2026; 14:00	Tabanguet 8	(18–13)	Bi Ndjee 7	BK Arena, Kigali; Attendance: 500; Referees: Moqriich, El Gahss (MAR)
30 January 2026; 14:00	4× (suspension)	Report	2× (suspension)	BK Arena, Kigali; Attendance: 500; Referees: Moqriich, El Gahss (MAR)

== Main round ==
Points and goals gained in the preliminary group against teams that advance will be transferred to the main round.

=== Group I ===
Pos	Team	Pld	W	D	L	GF	GA	GD	Pts	Qualification
1	Egypt	3	3	0	0	131	78	+53	**6**	Semifinals
2	Algeria	3	1	0	2	78	89	−11	**2 (Note: Algeria 2 Pts, +3 GD; Nigeria 2 Pts, −1 GD; Angola 2 Pts, −2 GD.)**	Semifinals
3	Nigeria	3	1	0	2	71	98	−27	**2**	5–8th place semifinals
4	Angola	3	1	0	2	77	92	−15	**2**	5–8th place semifinals

Source: IHF
Rules for classification: 1) points; 2) head-to-head points; 3) head-to-head goal difference; 4) head-to-head number of goals scored; 5) goal difference.
Notes:

25 January 2026; 11:30	**Nigeria**	**24–27**	**Angola**	BK Arena, Kigali; Attendance: 100; Referees: Belkhiri, Hamidi (ALG)
25 January 2026; 11:30	Yusuf 9	(11–14)	Chicola 9	BK Arena, Kigali; Attendance: 100; Referees: Belkhiri, Hamidi (ALG)
25 January 2026; 11:30	1× (yellow card) 8× (suspension) 1× (red card)	Report	1× (yellow card) 3× (suspension) 1× (red card)	BK Arena, Kigali; Attendance: 100; Referees: Belkhiri, Hamidi (ALG)

25 January 2026; 16:30	**Egypt**	**42–28**	**Algeria**	BK Arena, Kigali; Attendance: 200; Referees: Mitrović, Vešović (MNE)
25 January 2026; 16:30	Omar 10	(20–10)	Benhalima 6	BK Arena, Kigali; Attendance: 200; Referees: Mitrović, Vešović (MNE)
25 January 2026; 16:30	4× (suspension)	Report	2× (yellow card) 7× (suspension)	BK Arena, Kigali; Attendance: 200; Referees: Mitrović, Vešović (MNE)

27 January 2026; 11:30	**Algeria**	**27–22**	**Angola**	BK Arena, Kigali; Attendance: 100; Referees: Faye, Diop (SEN)
27 January 2026; 11:30	Abdi 8	(14–10)	Pestana 7	BK Arena, Kigali; Attendance: 100; Referees: Faye, Diop (SEN)
27 January 2026; 11:30	3× (yellow card) 5× (suspension)	Report	3× (suspension)	BK Arena, Kigali; Attendance: 100; Referees: Faye, Diop (SEN)

27 January 2026; 16:30	**Egypt**	**48–22**	**Nigeria**	BK Arena, Kigali; Attendance: 300; Referees: Ben Dahou, Zoghlami (TUN)
27 January 2026; 16:30	Emad 12	(24–10)	Iyortyer 5	BK Arena, Kigali; Attendance: 300; Referees: Ben Dahou, Zoghlami (TUN)
27 January 2026; 16:30	2× (suspension)	Report	4× (suspension) 2× (red card)	BK Arena, Kigali; Attendance: 300; Referees: Ben Dahou, Zoghlami (TUN)

=== Group II ===
Pos	Team	Pld	W	D	L	GF	GA	GD	Pts	Qualification
1	Tunisia	3	2	1	0	101	79	+22	**5**	Semifinals
2	Cape Verde	3	2	0	1	103	90	+13	**4**	Semifinals
3	Morocco	3	1	1	1	95	88	+7	**3**	5–8th place semifinals
4	Guinea	3	0	0	3	76	118	−42	**0**	5–8th place semifinals

Source: IHF
Rules for classification: 1) points; 2) head-to-head points; 3) head-to-head goal difference; 4) head-to-head number of goals scored; 5) goal difference.

25 January 2026; 14:00	**Tunisia**	**29–29**	**Morocco**	BK Arena, Kigali; Attendance: 100; Referees: Gasmi, Gasmi (FRA)
25 January 2026; 14:00	Abdelli 9	(18–12)	Saa 8	BK Arena, Kigali; Attendance: 100; Referees: Gasmi, Gasmi (FRA)
25 January 2026; 14:00	7× (suspension) 1× (red card)	Report	1× (yellow card) 5× (suspension)	BK Arena, Kigali; Attendance: 100; Referees: Gasmi, Gasmi (FRA)

25 January 2026; 19:00	**Cape Verde**	**45–25**	**Guinea**	BK Arena, Kigali; Attendance: 200; Referees: El-Saied, El-Saied (EGY)
25 January 2026; 19:00	Pina 10	(25–11)	Charti 5	BK Arena, Kigali; Attendance: 200; Referees: El-Saied, El-Saied (EGY)
25 January 2026; 19:00	2× (suspension)	Report	2× (suspension)	BK Arena, Kigali; Attendance: 200; Referees: El-Saied, El-Saied (EGY)

27 January 2026; 19:00	**Guinea**	**26–38**	**Morocco**	Petit Stade, Kigali; Attendance: 100; Referees: Kamal, Mohamed (EGY)
27 January 2026; 19:00	Paquiom 8	(15–16)	Rezzouki 9	Petit Stade, Kigali; Attendance: 100; Referees: Kamal, Mohamed (EGY)
27 January 2026; 19:00	5× (suspension)	Report	4× (suspension)	Petit Stade, Kigali; Attendance: 100; Referees: Kamal, Mohamed (EGY)

27 January 2026; 19:00	**Cape Verde**	**25–37**	**Tunisia**	BK Arena, Kigali; Attendance: 400; Referees: Belkhiri, Hamidi (ALG)
27 January 2026; 19:00	Pina 6	(10–15)	Abdelli 10	BK Arena, Kigali; Attendance: 400; Referees: Belkhiri, Hamidi (ALG)
27 January 2026; 19:00	6× (suspension)	Report	2× (yellow card) 4× (suspension)	BK Arena, Kigali; Attendance: 400; Referees: Belkhiri, Hamidi (ALG)

== Final round ==
=== Bracket ===
Semi-finals
29 January
Egypt	32
Cape Verde	26
29 January
Algeria	24
Tunisia	33

Final
31 January
Egypt	37
Tunisia	24
Third place
31 January
Cape Verde	29
Algeria	23

5–8th place bracket

5–8th place semfinals
29 January
Nigeria	30
Guinea	28
29 January
Angola	27
Morocco	20

Fifth place
30 January
Nigeria	20
Angola	25
Seventh place
30 January
Guinea	33 (4)
Morocco (pen)	33 (5)

=== 5–8th place semifinals ===
29 January 2026; 11:30	Nigeria	30–28	Guinea	BK Arena, Kigali; Attendance: 100; Referees: Ahmed, Mohamed (EGY)
29 January 2026; 11:30	Sulaimon, Shagari 8	(16–14)	Ruffe 7	BK Arena, Kigali; Attendance: 100; Referees: Ahmed, Mohamed (EGY)
29 January 2026; 11:30	4× (suspension) 1× (red card)	Report		BK Arena, Kigali; Attendance: 100; Referees: Ahmed, Mohamed (EGY)

29 January 2026; 14:00	Angola	27–20	Morocco	BK Arena, Kigali; Attendance: 100; Referees: El Saied, El Saied (EGY)
29 January 2026; 14:00	Sebastião 7	(12–10)	Saa 4	BK Arena, Kigali; Attendance: 100; Referees: El Saied, El Saied (EGY)
29 January 2026; 14:00	1× (yellow card) 2× (suspension)	Report	2× (yellow card) 4× (suspension)	BK Arena, Kigali; Attendance: 100; Referees: El Saied, El Saied (EGY)

=== Semifinals ===
29 January 2026; 16:30	Egypt	32–26	Cape Verde	BK Arena, Kigali; Attendance: 250; Referees: Faye, Diop (SEN)
29 January 2026; 16:30	Omar 10	(16–11)	Landim 8	BK Arena, Kigali; Attendance: 250; Referees: Faye, Diop (SEN)
29 January 2026; 16:30	2× (yellow card) 3× (suspension) 1× (red card)	Report	2× (yellow card) 7× (suspension)	BK Arena, Kigali; Attendance: 250; Referees: Faye, Diop (SEN)

29 January 2026; 19:00	Algeria	24–33	Tunisia	BK Arena, Kigali; Attendance: 300; Referees: Mitrović, Vešović (MNE)
29 January 2026; 19:00	three players 4	(11–19)	Abdelli 9	BK Arena, Kigali; Attendance: 300; Referees: Mitrović, Vešović (MNE)
29 January 2026; 19:00	2× (yellow card) 6× (suspension)	Report	6× (suspension) 1× (red card)	BK Arena, Kigali; Attendance: 300; Referees: Mitrović, Vešović (MNE)

=== Seventh place game ===
30 January 2026
12:00
Guinea
37–38
Morocco
BK Arena, Kigali
Attendance: 500
Referees: Ben Dahou, Zoghlami (TUN)
Eponouh 8
(16–14)
Boukhamsa 9
2× (suspension) 1× (red card)
Report
1× (yellow card)

FT: 33–33 Pen: 4–5

=== Fifth place game ===
30 January 2026; 19:00	Nigeria	20–25	Angola	BK Arena, Kigali; Attendance: 200; Referees: Belkhiri, Hamidi (ALG)
30 January 2026; 19:00	Salami 5	(12–9)	Sousa 6	BK Arena, Kigali; Attendance: 200; Referees: Belkhiri, Hamidi (ALG)
30 January 2026; 19:00	5× (suspension) 1× (red card)	Report	1× (yellow card) 3× (suspension)	BK Arena, Kigali; Attendance: 200; Referees: Belkhiri, Hamidi (ALG)

=== Third place game ===
31 January 2026; 13:30	Cape Verde	29–23	Algeria	BK Arena, Kigali; Attendance: 600; Referees: El Saied, El Saied (EGY)
31 January 2026; 13:30	García 6	(16–16)	Mahdi 6	BK Arena, Kigali; Attendance: 600; Referees: El Saied, El Saied (EGY)
31 January 2026; 13:30	1× (yellow card) 3× (suspension)	Report	8× (suspension) 1× (red card)	BK Arena, Kigali; Attendance: 600; Referees: El Saied, El Saied (EGY)

=== Final ===
31 January 2026; 16:00	Egypt	37–24	Tunisia	BK Arena, Kigali; Attendance: 3,000; Referees: Gasmi, Gasmi (FRA)
31 January 2026; 16:00	Emad, Omar 6	(17–10)	Ben Salem, Ridha 4	BK Arena, Kigali; Attendance: 3,000; Referees: Gasmi, Gasmi (FRA)
31 January 2026; 16:00	1× (yellow card) 5× (suspension)	Report	1× (yellow card) 5× (suspension)	BK Arena, Kigali; Attendance: 3,000; Referees: Gasmi, Gasmi (FRA)

== Final ranking ==
Pos	Team	Pld	W	D	L	GF	GA	GD	Pts	Final result
1	Egypt	7	7	0	0	290	166	+124	14	Champions
2	Tunisia	7	5	1	1	238	183	+55	11	Runners-up
3	Cape Verde	7	5	0	2	224	197	+27	10	Third place
4	Algeria	7	3	0	4	208	197	+11	6	Fourth place
5	Angola	7	5	0	2	199	174	+25	10	Fifth place game
6	Nigeria	7	4	0	3	187	189	−2	8	Fifth place game
7	Morocco	7	4	1	2	244	211	+33	9	Seventh place game
8	Guinea	7	2	0	5	201	231	−30	4	Seventh place game
9	Gabon	7	5	0	2	216	175	+41	10	Ninth place game
10	Cameroon	7	4	0	3	194	194	0	8	Ninth place game
11	Congo	7	3	1	3	206	204	+2	7	Eleventh place game
12	Rwanda (H)	7	3	0	4	202	210	−8	6	Eleventh place game
13	Benin	7	2	1	4	203	226	−23	5	Thirteenth place game
14	Zambia	7	1	0	6	156	245	−89	2	Thirteenth place game
15	Kenya	7	1	0	6	185	239	−54	2	Fifteenth place game
16	Uganda	7	0	0	7	155	267	−112	0	Fifteenth place game

Source: IHF
Rules for classification: 1) points; 2) head-to-head points; 3) head-to-head goal difference; 4) head-to-head number of goals scored; 5) goal difference.
(H) Hosts

=== Qualification table ===
Rank	Team
1st place, gold medalist(s)	Egypt
2nd place, silver medalist(s)	Tunisia
3rd place, bronze medalist(s)	Cape Verde
4	Algeria
5	Angola
6	Nigeria
7	Morocco
8	Guinea
9	Gabon
10	Cameroon
11	Congo
12	Rwanda
13	Benin
14	Zambia
15	Kenya
16	Uganda

Qualified for the 2027 World Championship

== Statistics ==
=== Top goalscorers ===
Rank	Name	Goals	Shots	%
1	(Zambia) Felix Kambundu	49	82	60
2	(Rwanda) Yves Kayijamahe	46	63	73
3	(Guinea) Natan Paquiom	45	58	78
4	(Gabon) Chérubin Tabanguet	44	60	73
5	(Egypt) Mohamed Emad	42	58	72
5	(Morocco) Amjad Saa	42	62	68
7	(Kenya) Christopher Mayende	41	63	65
8	(Cape Verde) Délcio Pina	38	60	63
9	(Tunisia) Bilel Abdelli	37	45	82
9	(Cape Verde) Bruno Landim	37	62	60

=== Top goalkeepers ===
Rank	Name	%	Saves	Shots
1	(Egypt) Abdelrahman Homayed	47	27	58
2	(Gabon) Ibrahim Koné	44	17	39
3	(Egypt) Mohamed Aly	41	45	111
4	(Algeria) Salim Mezaza	40	14	35
5	(Tunisia) Fradj Ben Tekaya	39	9	23
5	(Gabon) Charles Ano	39	51	132
7	(Nigeria) Solomon Micheal	36	71	200
8	(Cape Verde) Bruno Fernandes	35	11	31
8	(Republic of the Congo) Jeremie Nomede	35	61	176
8	(Angola) Giovany Muachissengue	35	49	142
