= Rwanda men's national handball team =

Rwanda

Information
- Association: Rwanda Handball Federation
- Coach: (Tunisia) Hafedh Zouabi

Colours
1st	2nd

Results

African Championship
- Appearances: 2 (First in 2024)
- Best result: 14th (2024)
- Last updated on Unknown.

The Rwanda national handball team is the national handball team of Rwanda and is controlled by the Rwanda Handball Federation.

== History ==
After failing to take part to the 2022 African Men's Handball Championship in Egypt, the Rwanda handball team participate for the first time two years after in the competition, the 2024 African Men's Handball Championship in the same country of Egypt.

== African Championship record ==
Year	Round	Position	Pld	W	D	L	GF	GA	GD
(Tunisia) 1974	did not enter								
(Algeria) 1976	did not enter								
(Republic of the Congo) 1979	did not enter								
(Tunisia) 1981	did not enter								
(Egypt) 1983	did not enter								
(Tunisia) 1985	did not enter								
(Morocco) 1987	did not enter								
(Algeria) 1989	did not enter								
(Egypt) 1991	did not enter								
(Ivory Coast) 1992	did not enter								
(Tunisia) 1994	did not enter								
(Benin) 1996	did not enter								
(South Africa) 1998	did not enter								
(Algeria) 2000	did not enter								
(Morocco) 2002	did not enter								
(Egypt) 2004	did not enter								
(Tunisia) 2006	did not enter								
(Angola) 2008	did not enter								
(Egypt) 2010	did not enter								
(Morocco) 2012	did not enter								
(Algeria) 2014	did not enter								
(Egypt) 2016	did not enter								
(Gabon) 2018	did not enter								
(Tunisia) 2020	did not enter								
(Egypt) 2022	withrew								
(Egypt) 2024	Group stage	14	3	1	0	2	83	115	−32
(Rwanda) 2026	Group stage	12	7	3	0	4	202	210	−8
Total	2/27	Group stage	10	4	0	6	285	325	−40
