= Rafael Guijosa =

Spanish handball player (born 1969)

Personal information
- Full name: Rafael Guijosa Castillo
- Nationality: Spanish
- Born: 31 January 1969 (age 57) Alcalá de Henares, Spain
- Height: 1.82 m (5 ft 11 1/2 in)

Sport
- Sport: Handball
- Position: left wing

Senior clubs
- Years: Team
- –: CD Iplacea
- 1989-1993: BM Guadalajara
- 1993-1995: Juventud Alcalá
- 1995-2002: FC Barcelona
National team
| Years | Team | Apps | (Gls) |
| 1995-2002 | Spain | 119 | (518) |

Teams managed
- 2003-2009: BM Alcobendas
- 2011: Toledo BM
- 2013-2014: Iran
- –: Samen Al-Hojaj Sabzewar
- 2015-2019: Ademar León
- 2020-: Al-Arabi
- 2023-2024: Rwanda
- 2024-: Iran
Medal record
Representing Spain
Olympic Games
| Bronze medal – third place | 1996 Atlanta | Team Competition |
| Bronze medal – third place | 2000 Sydney | Team Competition |
European Championship
| Silver medal – second place | 1998 Italy |
| Bronze medal – third place | 2000 Croatia |

Rafael Guijosa Castillo (born 31 January 1969, in Alcalá de Henares) is a former Spanish handball player, and current manager of Iran men's national handball team. When playing for the Spanish national team, he won bronze medals both in the 1996 Summer Olympics in Atlanta and in the 2000 Summer Olympics in Sydney.

Guijosa was voted World Player of the Year 1999 by the International Handball Federation.

== Career ==
Guijosa joined BM Guadalajara in the top Spanish league from CD Iplacea in 1989. In 1993 he joined Juventud Alcalá in Madrid. Here he reached the final of the Copa del Rey de Balonmano in 1994. The following summer he joined FC Barcelona, where he played until his retirement in 2002. With Barcelona he won many title, including the EHF Champions League 5 times.

At the 1999 World Championship he scored the second most goals with 50, behind Cubas Rolando Uríos (57).

== Coaching career ==
His coaching career sparted with the Spanish teams BM Alcobendas and Toledo BM, before he became the head coach of Iran. Here he won bronze medals at the 2014 Asian Championships. For a short while he was the coach of Iranian club Samen Al-Hojaj Sabzewar, but since the Iranian team decided to ban dual coaching positions, he resigned from that position.

In 2015 he returned to club handball to coach Ademar León. Here he was until 2019.

In August 2020 he took over the Qatari team Al-Arabi SC, where he won the 2020 Qatari championship.

In December 2023 he became the head coach of Rwanda. Here he led the team at their first ever African Championship in 2024, where the team finished 14th and won one match against Zambia. After 10 months he left the position to return as the head coach of Iran.
