= 2024 African Men's Handball Championship =

International handball competition

Tournament details
- Host country: Egypt
- Venues: 2 (in 1 host city)
- Dates: 17–27 January
- Teams: 16 (from 1 confederation)

Final positions
- Champions: Egypt (9th title)
- Runners-up: Algeria
- Third place: Tunisia
- Fourth place: Cape Verde

Tournament statistics
- Matches played: 48
- Goals scored: 2,699 (56.23 per match)

The 2024 African Men's Handball Championship was the 26th edition of the African Men's Handball Championship, held from 17 to 27 January 2024 in Egypt. It acted as the African qualifying tournament for the 2025 World Men's Handball Championship, with the top five nations qualifying. It also acted as the African qualifying tournament for the 2024 Summer Olympics in Paris, France, with the champions qualifying.

Egypt won their ninth title by defeating Algeria in the final.

== Qualification ==
Below the qualified teams:

Country	Zone	Previous appearances in tournament
Algeria	1	24 (1976, 1979, **1981**, **1983**, **1985**, **1987**, **1989**, 1991, 1992, 1994, **1996**, 1998, 2000, 2002, 2004, 2006, 2008, 2010, 2012, **2014**, 2016, 2018, 2020, 2022)
Angola	6	17 (1981, 1983, 1985, 1987, 1989, 1998, 2002, 2004, 2006, 2008, 2010, 2012, 2014, 2016, 2018, 2020, 2022)
Cameroon	4	16 (1974, 1976, 1979, 1996, 1998, 2002, 2004, 2006, 2008, 2010, 2012, 2014, 2016, 2018, 2020, 2022)
Cape Verde	2	2 (2020, 2022)
Congo	4	20 (1979, 1981, 1983, 1985, 1987, 1989, 1991, 1994, 1996, 1998, 2002, 2004, 2006, 2010, 2012, 2014, 2016, 2018, 2020, 2022)
DR Congo	4	12 (1992, 2000, 2002, 2004, 2006, 2008, 2010, 2014, 2016, 2018, 2020, 2022)
Egypt	5	23 (1979, 1981, 1983, 1985, 1987, 1989, **1991**, **1992**, 1994, 1996, 1998, **2000**, 2002, **2004**, 2006, **2008**, 2010, 2012, 2014, **2016**, 2018, **2020**, **2022**)
Gabon	4	9 (2000, 2002, 2006, 2010, 2014, 2016, 2018, 2020, 2022)
Guinea	2	3 (1981, 2020, 2022)
Kenya	5	4 (2004, 2016, 2020, 2022)
Libya	1	5 (2004, 2010, 2014, 2016, 2020)
Morocco	1	19 (1987, 1989, 1991, 1992, 1994, 1996, 1998, 2000, 2002, 2004, 2006, 2008, 2010, 2012, 2014, 2016, 2018, 2020, 2022)
Nigeria	3	12 (1979, 1981, 1996, 1998, 2002, 2006, 2018, 2010, 2014, 2018, 2020, 2022)
Rwanda	5	0 (debut)
Tunisia	1	25 (**1974**, **1976**, **1979**, 1981, 1983, 1985, 1987, 1989, 1991, 1992, **1994**, 1996, **1998**, 2000, **2002**, 2004, **2006**, 2008, **2010**, **2012**, 2014, 2016, **2018**, 2020, 2022)
Zambia	6	2 (2020, 2022)

Note: Bold indicates champion for that year. Italic indicates host for that year.

== Draw ==
The draw was held on 16 November 2023.

== Venues ==
2024 African Men's Handball Championship is located in Egypt	Cairo	
2024 African Men's Handball Championship is located in Egypt	Cairo Stadium Indoor Halls Complex	
2024 African Men's Handball Championship is located in Egypt	Main Hall	Second Hall
2024 African Men's Handball Championship is located in Egypt	Capacity: 16,900	Capacity: 1,620

== Referees ==
Nine referee pairs were selected.

Referees
Algeria	Youcef Belkhiri; Hamdi Sid Ali
Egypt	Heidy El-Sayed; Yasmina-El Sayed
Egypt	Alaa Emam; Hossam Hedaia
Hungary	Ádám Bíró; Olivér Kiss
Ivory Coast	Abdoulaye Koné; Joel Yapo

Referees
Morocco	Mohamed Chouraki; Achraf El Mounir
Morocco	Zakaria El Malwane; Mohamed El Ghass
Senegal	Abdoulaye Faye; Fadel Diop
Tunisia	Makrem Ben Dahou; Rochdi Zoghlami

== Preliminary round ==
All times are local (UTC+2).

=== Group A ===
Pos	Team	Pld	W	D	L	GF	GA	GD	Pts	Qualification
1	Cape Verde	3	3	0	0	126	62	+64	6	Quarterfinals
2	DR Congo	3	2	0	1	100	70	+30	4	Quarterfinals
3	Rwanda	3	1	0	2	83	115	−32	2	Placement round
4	Zambia	3	0	0	3	59	121	−62	0	Placement round

Rules for classification: 1) points; 2) head-to-head points; 3) head-to-head goal difference; 4) head-to-head number of goals scored; 5) goal difference.

17 January 2024; 12:00	DR Congo	40–21	Zambia	Main Hall; Attendance: 200; Referees: El-Sayed, El-Sayed (EGY)
17 January 2024; 12:00	Kiangbeni 8	(20–8)	Syakwayi 9	Main Hall; Attendance: 200; Referees: El-Sayed, El-Sayed (EGY)
17 January 2024; 12:00	2× (suspension)	Report	1× (yellow card) 2× (suspension)	Main Hall; Attendance: 200; Referees: El-Sayed, El-Sayed (EGY)

17 January 2024; 14:00	Cape Verde	52–27	Rwanda	Main Hall; Attendance: 200; Referees: Ben Dahou, Zoghlami (TUN)
17 January 2024; 14:00	three players 7	(24–13)	three players 4	Main Hall; Attendance: 200; Referees: Ben Dahou, Zoghlami (TUN)
17 January 2024; 14:00	6× (suspension)	Report	6× (suspension) 1× (red card)	Main Hall; Attendance: 200; Referees: Ben Dahou, Zoghlami (TUN)

19 January 2024; 14:00	Rwanda	20–38	DR Congo	Second Hall
19 January 2024; 14:00		(11–18)		Second Hall

19 January 2024; 16:00	Zambia	13–45	Cape Verde	Second Hall
19 January 2024; 16:00		(8–23)		Second Hall

21 January 2024; 16:00	Zambia	25–36	Rwanda	Second Hall
21 January 2024; 16:00		(12–18)		Second Hall

21 January 2024; 18:00	Cape Verde	29–22	DR Congo	Second Hall
21 January 2024; 18:00		(16–11)		Second Hall

=== Group B ===
Pos	Team	Pld	W	D	L	GF	GA	GD	Pts	Qualification
1	Egypt (H)	3	3	0	0	102	50	+52	6	Quarterfinals
2	Guinea	3	2	0	1	63	74	−11	4	Quarterfinals
3	Cameroon	3	1	0	2	60	79	−19	2	Placement round
4	Congo	3	0	0	3	62	84	−22	0	Placement round

Rules for classification: 1) points; 2) head-to-head points; 3) head-to-head goal difference; 4) head-to-head number of goals scored; 5) goal difference.
(H) Hosts

17 January 2024; 16:00	Cameroon	25–21	Congo	Main Hall; Attendance: 1,200; Referees: Chouraki, El Mounir (MAR)
17 January 2024; 16:00	Eyebe 6	(13–6)	Hubesch 6	Main Hall; Attendance: 1,200; Referees: Chouraki, El Mounir (MAR)
17 January 2024; 16:00	2× (suspension)	Report	1× (yellow card) 1× (suspension)	Main Hall; Attendance: 1,200; Referees: Chouraki, El Mounir (MAR)

17 January 2024; 20:00	Egypt	33–15	Guinea	Main Hall; Attendance: 1,200; Referees: Belkhiri, Hamidi (ALG)
17 January 2024; 20:00	Abdou 7	(18–7)	three players 3	Main Hall; Attendance: 1,200; Referees: Belkhiri, Hamidi (ALG)
17 January 2024; 20:00	3× (suspension)	Report	1× (yellow card) 3× (suspension)	Main Hall; Attendance: 1,200; Referees: Belkhiri, Hamidi (ALG)

19 January 2024; 16:00	Guinea	23–19	Cameroon	Main Hall; Attendance: 500; Referees: Ben Dahou, Zoghlami (TUN)
19 January 2024; 16:00	Mannou 13	(10–11)	Fokou 5	Main Hall; Attendance: 500; Referees: Ben Dahou, Zoghlami (TUN)
19 January 2024; 16:00	4× (suspension)	Report	1× (yellow card) 5× (suspension)	Main Hall; Attendance: 500; Referees: Ben Dahou, Zoghlami (TUN)

19 January 2024; 18:00	Egypt	34–19	Congo	Main Hall; Attendance: 1,200; Referees: Faye, Diop (SEN)
19 January 2024; 18:00	Reda 7	(16–11)	Okoko 8	Main Hall; Attendance: 1,200; Referees: Faye, Diop (SEN)
19 January 2024; 18:00	1× (suspension)	Report	2× (yellow card) 3× (suspension)	Main Hall; Attendance: 1,200; Referees: Faye, Diop (SEN)

21 January 2024; 16:00	Congo	22–25	Guinea	Main Hall; Attendance: 1,200; Referees: Bíró, Kiss (HUN)
21 January 2024; 16:00	Taty 10	(9–15)	Lebon 14	Main Hall; Attendance: 1,200; Referees: Bíró, Kiss (HUN)
21 January 2024; 16:00	1× (yellow card) 7× (suspension)	Report	1× (yellow card) 2× (suspension)	Main Hall; Attendance: 1,200; Referees: Bíró, Kiss (HUN)

21 January 2024; 18:00	Cameroon	16–35	Egypt	Main Hall; Attendance: 1,200; Referees: Chouraki, El Mounir (MAR)
21 January 2024; 18:00	Eyebe II 5	(9–17)	four players 4	Main Hall; Attendance: 1,200; Referees: Chouraki, El Mounir (MAR)
21 January 2024; 18:00	1× (yellow card) 2× (suspension)	Report	1× (suspension)	Main Hall; Attendance: 1,200; Referees: Chouraki, El Mounir (MAR)

=== Group C ===
Pos	Team	Pld	W	D	L	GF	GA	GD	Pts	Qualification
1	Algeria	3	3	0	0	95	69	+26	6	Quarterfinals
2	Morocco	3	2	0	1	86	80	+6	4	Quarterfinals
3	Libya	3	1	0	2	69	88	−19	2	Placement round
4	Gabon	3	0	0	3	76	89	−13	0	Placement round

Rules for classification: 1) points; 2) head-to-head points; 3) head-to-head goal difference; 4) head-to-head number of goals scored; 5) goal difference.

17 January 2024; 10:00	Algeria	31–27	Gabon	Second Hall; Attendance: 700; Referees: Faye, Diop (SEN)
17 January 2024; 10:00	Abdi 7	(16–12)	Aubyang 7	Second Hall; Attendance: 700; Referees: Faye, Diop (SEN)
17 January 2024; 10:00	1× (suspension)	Report	2× (suspension)	Second Hall; Attendance: 700; Referees: Faye, Diop (SEN)

17 January 2024; 14:00	Morocco	30–25	Libya	Second Hall; Attendance: 1,200; Referees: Emam, Hossam (EGY)
17 January 2024; 14:00	Ezzine 7	(17–14)	Al-Har 6	Second Hall; Attendance: 1,200; Referees: Emam, Hossam (EGY)
17 January 2024; 14:00	7× (suspension)	Report	1× (yellow card) 7× (suspension)	Second Hall; Attendance: 1,200; Referees: Emam, Hossam (EGY)

19 January 2024; 18:00	Libya	19–34	Algeria	Second Hall; Attendance: 500; Referees: El-Sayed, El-Sayed (EGY)
19 January 2024; 18:00	Al-Rabia, Al-Shati 5	(10–18)	Saker 8	Second Hall; Attendance: 500; Referees: El-Sayed, El-Sayed (EGY)
19 January 2024; 18:00	4× (suspension)	Report	7× (suspension)	Second Hall; Attendance: 500; Referees: El-Sayed, El-Sayed (EGY)

19 January 2024; 20:00	Gabon	25–33	Morocco	Second Hall; Attendance: 400; Referees: Bíró, Kiss (HUN)
19 January 2024; 20:00	Aubyang 11	(9–16)	Lakbi 8	Second Hall; Attendance: 400; Referees: Bíró, Kiss (HUN)
19 January 2024; 20:00	1× (suspension) 1× (red card)	Report	4× (suspension)	Second Hall; Attendance: 400; Referees: Bíró, Kiss (HUN)

21 January 2024; 14:00	Gabon	24–25	Libya	Main Hall; Attendance: 1,200; Referees: Ben Dahou, Zoghlami (TUN)
21 January 2024; 14:00	Wora 6	(10–13)	Al-Rabia 7	Main Hall; Attendance: 1,200; Referees: Ben Dahou, Zoghlami (TUN)
21 January 2024; 14:00	1× (suspension)	Report	3× (suspension)	Main Hall; Attendance: 1,200; Referees: Ben Dahou, Zoghlami (TUN)

21 January 2024; 20:00	Morocco	23–30	Algeria	Main Hall; Attendance: 800; Referees: Faye, Diop (SEN)
21 January 2024; 20:00	Mansari 7	(13–16)	Abdi 7	Main Hall; Attendance: 800; Referees: Faye, Diop (SEN)
21 January 2024; 20:00	2× (yellow card) 5× (suspension)	Report	2× (yellow card) 4× (suspension)	Main Hall; Attendance: 800; Referees: Faye, Diop (SEN)

=== Group D ===
Pos	Team	Pld	W	D	L	GF	GA	GD	Pts	Qualification
1	Tunisia	3	3	0	0	128	67	+61	6	Quarterfinals
2	Angola	3	2	0	1	104	77	+27	4	Quarterfinals
3	Nigeria	3	1	0	2	75	85	−10	2	Placement round
4	Kenya	3	0	0	3	61	139	−78	0	Placement round

Rules for classification: 1) points; 2) head-to-head points; 3) head-to-head goal difference; 4) head-to-head number of goals scored; 5) goal difference.

17 January 2024; 12:00	Tunisia	59–18	Kenya	Second Hall; Attendance: 500; Referees: El Malwane, El Ghass (MAR)
17 January 2024; 12:00	Toumi 10	(27–4)	Kirimi 5	Second Hall; Attendance: 500; Referees: El Malwane, El Ghass (MAR)
17 January 2024; 12:00	2× (suspension)	Report	2× (suspension)	Second Hall; Attendance: 500; Referees: El Malwane, El Ghass (MAR)

17 January 2024; 16:00	Angola	26–24	Nigeria	Second Hall; Attendance: 1,200; Referees: Bíró, Kiss (HUN)
17 January 2024; 16:00	Ferreira 9	(13–11)	Ani 8	Second Hall; Attendance: 1,200; Referees: Bíró, Kiss (HUN)
17 January 2024; 16:00	2× (suspension)	Report	1× (suspension)	Second Hall; Attendance: 1,200; Referees: Bíró, Kiss (HUN)

19 January 2024; 14:00	Kenya	20–48	Angola	Main Hall; Attendance: 500; Referees: Emam, Hossam (EGY)
19 January 2024; 14:00	Wakhuka 5	(10–28)	Pascoal 10	Main Hall; Attendance: 500; Referees: Emam, Hossam (EGY)
19 January 2024; 14:00	5× (suspension)	Report	2× (suspension)	Main Hall; Attendance: 500; Referees: Emam, Hossam (EGY)

19 January 2024; 20:00	Nigeria	19–36	Tunisia	Main Hall; Attendance: 1,200; Referees: Chouraki, El Mounir (MAR)
19 January 2024; 20:00	Yusuf 7	(10–18)	Rzig 9	Main Hall; Attendance: 1,200; Referees: Chouraki, El Mounir (MAR)
19 January 2024; 20:00	3× (suspension) 2× (red card)	Report	3× (suspension)	Main Hall; Attendance: 1,200; Referees: Chouraki, El Mounir (MAR)

21 January 2024; 14:00	Nigeria	32–23	Kenya	Second Hall
21 January 2024; 14:00		(16–9)		Second Hall

21 January 2024; 20:00	Tunisia	33–30	Angola	Second Hall; Attendance: 1,200; Referees: Belkhiri, Ali (ALG)
21 January 2024; 20:00	Sanaï 6	(16–15)	Hebo 5	Second Hall; Attendance: 1,200; Referees: Belkhiri, Ali (ALG)
21 January 2024; 20:00	1× (yellow card) 5× (suspension) 1× (red card)	Report	1× (yellow card) 1× (red card)	Second Hall; Attendance: 1,200; Referees: Belkhiri, Ali (ALG)

== Placement round ==
=== Bracket ===
Ninth place bracket

9–16th place semifinals
23 January
Rwanda	33
Gabon	37
23 January
Cameroon	36
Kenya	18
23 January
Libya	36
Zambia	17
23 January
Nigeria	27
Congo	26

9–12th place
24 January
Gabon	21
Cameroon	28
24 January
Libya	24
Nigeria	31

Ninth place
26 January
Cameroon	25
Nigeria	33
11th place
26 January
Gabon	25
Libya	24

13th place bracket

13–16th place semifinals
24 January
Rwanda	32
Kenya	24
24 January
Zambia	17
Congo	36

13th place
26 January
Rwanda	28
Congo	42
15th place
26 January
Kenya	34
Zambia	28

=== 9–16th place quarterfinals ===
23 January 2024; 10:30	Rwanda	33–37	Gabon	Second Hall
23 January 2024; 10:30		(17–22)		Second Hall

23 January 2024; 13:00	Libya	36–17	Zambia	Second Hall
23 January 2024; 13:00		(19–3)		Second Hall

23 January 2024; 15:00	Cameroon	36–18	Kenya	Second Hall
23 January 2024; 15:00		(15–7)		Second Hall

23 January 2024; 18:00	Nigeria	27–26	Congo	Second Hall
23 January 2024; 18:00		(14–16)		Second Hall

=== 13–16th place semifinals ===
24 January 2024; 13:00	Rwanda	32–24	Kenya	Second Hall
24 January 2024; 13:00		(19–10)		Second Hall

24 January 2024; 15:00	Zambia	17–36	Congo	Second Hall
24 January 2024; 15:00		(8–21)		Second Hall

=== 9–12th place semifinals ===
24 January 2024; 13:00	Gabon	21–28	Cameroon	Main Hall
24 January 2024; 13:00		(8–16)		Main Hall

24 January 2024; 17:00	Libya	24–31	Nigeria	Second Hall
24 January 2024; 17:00		(10–14)		Second Hall

=== 15th place game ===
26 January 2024; 14:00	Kenya	34–28	Zambia	Second Hall
26 January 2024; 14:00		(15–16)		Second Hall

=== 13th place game ===
26 January 2024; 16:00	Rwanda	28–42	Congo	Second Hall
26 January 2024; 16:00		(16–20)		Second Hall

=== Eleventh place game ===
26 January 2024; 18:00	Gabon	25–24	Libya	Second Hall
26 January 2024; 18:00		(13–12)		Second Hall

=== Ninth place game ===
26 January 2024; 16:00	Cameroon	25–33	Nigeria	Main Hall
26 January 2024; 16:00		(12–15)		Main Hall

== Knockout stage ==
=== Bracket ===
Championship bracket

Quarter-finals
23 January
Cape Verde	31
Morocco	22
23 January
Algeria	36
DR Congo	23
23 January
Egypt	37
Angola	25
23 January
Tunisia	37
Guinea	24

Semi-finals
25 January
Cape Verde	26
Algeria	32
25 January
Egypt	30
Tunisia	25

Final
27 January
Algeria	21
Egypt	29
Third place
27 January
Cape Verde	28
Tunisia	35

Fifth place bracket

5–8th place semifinals
24 January
Morocco	30 (6)
DR Congo (Pen.)	30 (7)
24 January
Angola	22 (2)
Guinea (Pen.)	22 (3)

Fifth place
26 January
DR Congo	26
Guinea	29
Seventh place
26 January
Morocco	25
Angola	23

=== Quarterfinals ===
23 January 2024; 10:30	Cape Verde	31–22	Morocco	Main Hall, Cairo; Attendance: 1,200; Referees: El Sayed, El Sayed (EGY)
23 January 2024; 10:30	Moreno 8	(13–10)	Lakbi 5	Main Hall, Cairo; Attendance: 1,200; Referees: El Sayed, El Sayed (EGY)
23 January 2024; 10:30	4× (suspension)	Report	1× (yellow card) 3× (suspension)	Main Hall, Cairo; Attendance: 1,200; Referees: El Sayed, El Sayed (EGY)

23 January 2024; 13:00	Algeria	36–23	DR Congo	Main Hall, Cairo; Attendance: 1,200; Referees: Bíró, Kiss (HUN)
23 January 2024; 13:00	Berkous 7	(14–15)	Tchitombi 6	Main Hall, Cairo; Attendance: 1,200; Referees: Bíró, Kiss (HUN)
23 January 2024; 13:00	1× (yellow card) 1× (suspension)	Report	1× (suspension)	Main Hall, Cairo; Attendance: 1,200; Referees: Bíró, Kiss (HUN)

23 January 2024; 15:30	Egypt	37–25	Angola	Main Hall, Cairo; Attendance: 1,200
23 January 2024; 15:30	Abdelrahman 7	(20–13)	Sibo 5	Main Hall, Cairo; Attendance: 1,200
23 January 2024; 15:30	3× (suspension)	Report	1× (yellow card) 3× (suspension) 1× (red card)	Main Hall, Cairo; Attendance: 1,200

23 January 2024; 18:00	Tunisia	37–24	Guinea	Main Hall, Cairo; Attendance: 700; Referees: Chouraki, El Mounir (MAR)
23 January 2024; 18:00	Maaref, Toumi 7	(17–12)	Corcher 7	Main Hall, Cairo; Attendance: 700; Referees: Chouraki, El Mounir (MAR)
23 January 2024; 18:00	3× (suspension)	Report	4× (suspension)	Main Hall, Cairo; Attendance: 700; Referees: Chouraki, El Mounir (MAR)

=== 5–8th place semifinals ===
24 January 2024
15:00
Morocco
36–37
DR Congo
Main Hall, Cairo
Attendance: 1,200
Referees: Emam, Hedaia (EGY)
Lakbi 9
(12–14)
Tchitombi 11
1× (yellow card) 3× (suspension)
Report
1× (yellow card) 5× (suspension)

FT: 30–30 Pen: 6–7

24 January 2024
17:30
Angola
24–25
Guinea
Main Hall, Cairo
Attendance: 1,200
Referees: El Malwane, El Ghass (MAR)
Chicola, Ferreira 4
(12–9)
Corcher 7
3× (suspension)
Report
1× (suspension)

FT: 22–22 Pen: 2–3

=== Semifinals ===
25 January 2024; 17:30	Egypt	30–25	Tunisia	Main Hall, Cairo; Attendance: 3,000; Referees: Bíró, Kiss (HUN)
25 January 2024; 17:30	Sanad 8	(17–12)	Ben Abdallah 5	Main Hall, Cairo; Attendance: 3,000; Referees: Bíró, Kiss (HUN)
25 January 2024; 17:30	3× (suspension)	Report	2× (yellow card) 4× (suspension)	Main Hall, Cairo; Attendance: 3,000; Referees: Bíró, Kiss (HUN)

25 January 2024; 20:30	Cape Verde	26–32	Algeria	Main Hall, Cairo; Attendance: 3,000; Referees: Bíró, Kiss (HUN)
25 January 2024; 20:30	D. Pina, Moreno 5	(8–16)	Abdi, Khermouche 7	Main Hall, Cairo; Attendance: 3,000; Referees: Bíró, Kiss (HUN)
25 January 2024; 20:30	1× (yellow card) 4× (suspension) 2× (red card)	Report	5× (suspension)	Main Hall, Cairo; Attendance: 3,000; Referees: Bíró, Kiss (HUN)

=== Seventh place game ===
26 January 2024; 14:00	Morocco	25–23	Angola	Main Hall, Cairo; Attendance: 300; Referees: Ben Dahou, Zoghlami (TUN)
26 January 2024; 14:00	Ezzine 9	(12–13)	Chicola 7	Main Hall, Cairo; Attendance: 300; Referees: Ben Dahou, Zoghlami (TUN)
26 January 2024; 14:00	1× (yellow card) 3× (suspension)	Report	3× (suspension) 1× (red card)	Main Hall, Cairo; Attendance: 300; Referees: Ben Dahou, Zoghlami (TUN)

=== Fifth place game ===
26 January 2024; 18:00	DR Congo	26–29	Guinea	Main Hall, Cairo; Attendance: 3,000; Referees: Belkhiri, Hamidi (ALG)
26 January 2024; 18:00	Tchitombi 7	(11–17)	Lebon 8	Main Hall, Cairo; Attendance: 3,000; Referees: Belkhiri, Hamidi (ALG)
26 January 2024; 18:00	1× (yellow card) 3× (suspension)	Report	1× (yellow card) 1× (suspension)	Main Hall, Cairo; Attendance: 3,000; Referees: Belkhiri, Hamidi (ALG)

=== Third place game ===
27 January 2024; 15:30	Cape Verde	28–35	Tunisia	Main Hall, Cairo; Attendance: 3,000; Referees: Belkhiri, Hamidi (ALG)
27 January 2024; 15:30	Semedo 6	(13–20)	Toumi 6	Main Hall, Cairo; Attendance: 3,000; Referees: Belkhiri, Hamidi (ALG)
27 January 2024; 15:30	1× (yellow card) 3× (suspension)	Report	1× (yellow card) 3× (suspension) 1× (red card)	Main Hall, Cairo; Attendance: 3,000; Referees: Belkhiri, Hamidi (ALG)

=== Final ===
27 January 2024; 18:00	Algeria	21–29	Egypt	Main Hall, Cairo; Attendance: 5,000; Referees: Bíró, Kiss (HUN)
27 January 2024; 18:00	Daoud 6	(10–17)	Nafea, Sanad 5	Main Hall, Cairo; Attendance: 5,000; Referees: Bíró, Kiss (HUN)
27 January 2024; 18:00	1× (yellow card) 5× (suspension)	Report	1× (yellow card) 1× (suspension)	Main Hall, Cairo; Attendance: 5,000; Referees: Bíró, Kiss (HUN)

== Ranking and statistics ==
=== Final ranking ===
Rank	Team
1st place, gold medalist(s)	Egypt
2nd place, silver medalist(s)	Algeria
3rd place, bronze medalist(s)	Tunisia
4	Cape Verde
5	Guinea
6	DR Congo
7	Morocco
8	Angola
9	Nigeria
10	Cameroon
11	Gabon
12	Libya
13	Congo
14	Rwanda
15	Kenya
16	Zambia

Qualified for the 2024 Summer Olympics and 2025 World Championship
Qualified for the 2024 Olympic Qualification Tournaments and 2025 World Championship
Qualified for the 2025 World Championship

== Awards ==
The all-star team was announced on 28 January 2024.

Position	Player
Goalkeeper	(Guinea) Pierre Rubens
Right wing	(Egypt) Mohamed Sanad
Right back	(Tunisia) Anouar Ben Abdallah
Centre back	(Algeria) Mustapha Hadj Sadok
Left back	(Egypt) Yehia El-Deraa
Left wing	(Egypt) Ahmed Nafea
Pivot	(Cape Verde) Paulo Moreno
MVP	(Egypt) Yahia Omar
