= Anouar Ben Abdallah =

Tunisian handball player

Personal information
- Nationality: Tunisian
- Born: 20 June 1996 (age 30) Moknine, Tunisia
- Height: 1.88 m (6 ft 2 in)

Sport
- Sport: Handball
- Position: Right wing/back
- Current club: Kazma SC
- Number: 10

Senior clubs
- Years: Team
- –2020: Étoile Sportive du Sahel
- 2020–2021: HT Tatran Prešov
- 2021–2022: Al-Salmiya SC
- 2022–: Kazma SC
National team
Years	Team	Apps	(Gls)
–	Tunisia	30	(39)
Medal record
African Championship
Gold medal – first place	2018 Gabon
Bronze medal – third place	2024 Egypt

Anouar Ben Abdallah (Arabic: أنور بن عبدالله; born 20 June 1996) is a Tunisian handball player for Kazma SC and the Tunisian national team.

He participated at the 2017 World Men's Handball Championship.
