= Morocco men's national handball team =

Morocco

Information
- Nickname: Atlas Lions
- Association: Royal Moroccan Handball Federation
- Coach: Mohammed Berrajaa
- Assistant coach: Khalid El Fil

Colours
1st	2nd

Results

World Championship
- Appearances: 8 (First in 1995)
- Best result: 17th (1999)

African Championship
- Appearances: 21 (First in 1987)
- Best result: (bronze) 3rd (2006, 2022)
- Last updated on Unknown.

Morocco men's national handball team
Medal record

African Championship
Bronze medal – third place	2006 Tunisia	
Bronze medal – third place	2022 Egypt	

African Games
Bronze medal – third place	2019 Morocco	

Arab Games
Silver medal – second place	1961 Morocco	
Silver medal – second place	1999 Jordania	
Bronze medal – third place	1985 Morocco	

The Moroccan national handball team is the national handball team of Morocco and is controlled by the Royal Moroccan Handball Federation based in Rabat, Morocco.

== Results ==
=== World Championship ===
Edition	Round	Position	Pld	W	D*	L	GF	GA	GD
1938 Germany	Did not enter								
1954 Sweden	Did not enter								
1958 East Germany	Did not enter								
1961 West Germany	Did not enter								
1964 Czechoslovakia	Did not enter								
1967 Sweden	Did not enter								
1970 France	Did not enter								
1974 East Germany	Did not enter								
1978 Denmark	Did not enter								
1982 West Germany	Did not enter								
1986 Switzerland	Did not enter								
1990 Czechoslovakia	Did not enter								
1993 Sweden	Did not Qualify								
1995 Iceland	Preliminary round	22nd of 24	5	0	0	5	93	149	−56
1997 Japan	Preliminary round	23rd of 24	5	0	0	5	90	141	−51
1999 Egypt	Preliminary round	17th of 24	5	0	3	2	100	117	−17
2001 France	Preliminary round	22nd of 24	5	0	0	5	112	162	−40
2003 Portugal	Preliminary round	23rd of 24	5	0	0	5	113	145	−32
2005 Tunisia	Did not Qualify								
2007 Germany	President's Cup	20th of 24	6	2	0	4	165	193	−28
2009 Croatia	Did not Qualify								
2011 Sweden	Did not Qualify								
2013 Spain	Did not Qualify								
2015 Qatar	Did not Qualify								
2017 France	Did not Qualify								
/ 2019 Denmark/Germany	Did not Qualify								
2021 Egypt	President's Cup	29th of 32	7	1	1	5	167	206	−39
/ 2023 Poland/Sweden	President's Cup	30th of 32	7	1	0	6	178	223	−45
// 2025 Croatia/Denmark/Norway	Did not Qualify								
2027 Germany	TBD								
/ 2029 France/Germany	TBD								
// 2031 Denmark/Iceland/Norway	TBD								
Total	8/32	0 Titles	45	4	4	37	1018	1336	−318

*Denotes draws include knockout matches decided in a penalty shootout.

=== African Championship ===
Edition	Round	Position	Pld	W	D	L	GF	GA	GD
1974 Tunisia	Did not Qualify								
1976 Algeria	Did not Qualify								
1979 People's Republic of the Congo	Did not Qualify								
1981 Tunisia	Did not Qualify								
1983 Egypt	Did not Qualify								
1985 Angola	Did not Qualify								
1987 Morocco	Preliminary round	8th place	4	0	1	3	73	88	−15
1989 Algeria	Preliminary round	5th place	4	1	1	2	72	77	−5
1991 Egypt	Bronze Medal Match	4th place	6	3	1	2			−7
1992 Ivory Coast	Match of 7th place	7th place	3	1	0	2	87	47	+40
1994 Tunisia	Bronze Medal Match	4th place	5	2	0	3	91	75	+15
1996 Benin	Bronze Medal Match	4th place	6	4	0	2	134	128	+6
1998 South Africa	Preliminary round	5th place	5	3	0	2	108	111	+3
2000 Algeria	Bronze Medal Match	4th place	6	3	1	2	136	113	+23
2002 Morocco	Bronze Medal Match	4th place	5	3	0	2	158	102	+56
2004 Egypt	Second round	6th place	6	2	0	4	158	185	−27
2006 Tunisia	Bronze Medal Match	3rd place	7	5	0	2	184	129	+55
2008 Angola	Preliminary round	8th place	5	1	0	4	122	144	−22
2010 Egypt	Main round	6th place	6	2	0	4	148	186	−38
2012 Morocco	Bronze Medal Match	4th place	8	5	0	3	183	196	−13
2014 Algeria	Quarter Finals	6th place	8	4	0	4	222	199	+23
2016 Egypt	Quarter finals	5th place	6	3	0	3	136	147	−11
2018 Gabon	Bronze Medal Match	4th place	7	3	0	5	180	196	+19
2020 Tunisia	Main round	6th place	8	4	0	4	247	223	+24
2022 Egypt	Bronze Medal Match	3rd place	5	3	0	2	130	135	−5
2024 Egypt	Quarter finals	7th place	6	3	0	3	169	171	−2
(Rwanda) 2026	Quarter finals	7th place	7	4	1	2	244	211	+33
Total	21/27	0 Titles	124	59	5	61	3011	2942	+69

=== African Games ===
Edition	Round	Position	Pld	W	D	L	GF	GA	GD
2019 Morocco	Semi finals	3rd place	6	4	0	2	190	122	+68
Total	1/13	0 Titles	6	4	0	2	190	122	+68

=== Mediterranean Games ===
Edition	Round	Position	Pld	W	D	L	GF	GA	GD
1983 Morocco	Preliminary Round	7th place	5	2	1	2	96	87	+9
1997 Italy	Preliminary Round	11th place	5	1	0	4	97	123	−26
2001 Tunisia	Preliminary Round	10th place	4	1	0	3	118	136	−18
Total	3/11	0 Titles	14	4	1	9	311	346	-35

=== Islamic Games ===
Edition	Round	Position	Pld	W	D	L	GF	GA	GD
1961 Morocco	Final	2º place							
1985 Morocco	bronze medal match	3º puesto	6	4	1	1			
(Jordan) 1999 Jordania	Final	2º place							
2005 Egypt	final phase	5º place	6	1	0	5	129	163	−34
(Qatar) 2011 Katar	group stage	6º place	3	1	0	2	77	83	−6
Total	5/9	0 Títulos	12	6	1	8	206	246	-40

=== Islamic Solidarity Games ===
Edition	Round	Position	Pld	W	D	L	GF	GA	GD
2005 Saudi Arabia	Qualifying round	6th place	5	1	0	4	153	168	−15
2017 Azerbaijan	Preliminary Round	6th place	4	2	0	2	98	99	−1
2021 Turkey	Preliminary Round	6th place	3	0	0	3	45	61	−16
Total	3/3	0 Titles	12	3	0	9	296	328	-32

=== Other Competitions ===
Angola international 50 years tournament

Edition	Round	Position	Pld	W	D	L	GF	GA	GD
2025 Angola	Final round	3rd place	3	1	0	2	72	89	−17
Total	1/1	0 Titles	3	1	0	2	72	89	-17

== Competitions (U20) ==
=== African Men's Junior Handball Championship ===
Year	Round	Place	MP	W	D	L	GF	GA	GD
Nigeria 1984	final phase	8th Place	??	??	??	??	??	??	??
Algeria 1986	final phase	7th Place	4	0	5	4	66	104	−38
Tunisia 1988	final phase	6th Place	5	0	0	5	93	114	−21
Egypt 1990	final phase	4th Place	4	1	0	3	53	77	−24
Ivory Coast 1998	final phase	5th Place	5	0	0	5	??	??	??
Ivory Coast 2006	group stage	5th Place	4	2	0	2	66	82	−16
Libya 2008	semi-finals	3rd Place	4	2	0	2	131	123	+8
Gabon 2010	group stage	10th Place	5	1	1	3	113	127	−14
Ivory Coast 2012	group stage	9th Place	6	3	0	3	136	133	+3
Mali 2016	final phase	5th Place	5	1	1	3	117	163	−46
Morocco 2018	final phase	4th Place	6	1	2	3	130	147	−17
Rwanda 2022	group stage	5th Place	4	1	1	2	114	115	−1
(Tunisia) Mahdia 2024	semi-finals	4th Place	6	3	0	3	186	143	+43
Total	0 Titles	13/21	58	15	5	38	1205	1328	−123

=== World Championship ===
Tunisia in the Junior World Championship record
Year	Round	Position	GP	W	D	L	GS	GA	GD
Sweden 1977	First round	19th	5	1	0	4	86	124	−36
Egypt 2009	First Round	22st	7	1	1	5	159	217	−58
Algeria 2017	First Round	22st	7	1	0	6	141	194	−53
Germany/Greece 2023	First round	23st	8	3	1	4	181	200	−19
2025 Poland	First Round	22st	8	3	1	4	253	262	−9
Total	5/25	0 Titles	35	9	3	23	820	997	−177

=== Arab Junior Championship ===
Edition	Round	Position	Pld	W	D	L	GF	GA	GD
2024 Morocco	Final	Champion	6	2	1	3	131	129	+3
Total	1/4	1 Titles	6	2	1	3	131	129	+3

== Competitions (U18) ==
=== World Youth Championship ===
Tunisia in the Youth World Championship record
Year	Round	Position	GP	W	D	L	GS	GA	GD
Qatar 2005	First Round	10th Place	5	0	0	5	103	173	−70
Bahrain 2007	First Round	15th Place	7	1	1	5	181	216	−35
Tunisia 2009	First Round	20th Place	6	0	0	6	111	220	−109
Argentina 2011
Hungary 2013
Russia 2015
(Georgia (country)) Georgia 2017
North Macedonia 2019
Croatia 2023	First Round	18th Place	8	3	1	4	238	239	−1
Egypt 2025	First Round	30th Place	8	1	0	7	204	266	−62
Total	5/11	0 Titles	34	5	2	27	837	1114	−277

=== African Youth Championship ===
Tunisia in the African Youth Championship record
Year	Round	Position	GP	W	D	L	GS	GA	GD
Ivory Coast 2000	Did not compete								
Morocco 2004	Final Round	3rd							
(Lebanon) Libya 2008	Final Round	5th							
Gabon 2010	Final Round	6th	5	0	0	5	90	143	−53
Ivory Coast 2012
Kenya 2014|
Mali 2016	QuarterFinals	5th	6	3	0	3	153	147	+6
Morocco 2018	Final Round	6th	6	1	0	5	108	152	−44
Morocco 2020	Cancelled due to the COVID-19 pandemic								
Rwanda 2022	SemiFinals	3rd	5	4	0	1	173	127	+54
Tunisia 2024	Semi Finals	4th	6	3	0	3	115	164	−49
Total	7/11	0 Titles	28	11	0	17	639	733	−96

== Competitions (U16) ==
=== World Cadet Championship ===
Tunisia in the Youth World Championship record
Year	Round	Position	GP	W	D	L	GS	GA	GD
Morocco 2025	First Round	11th Place	5	0	1	4	151	175	−24
Total	1/1	0 Titles	5	0	1	4	151	175	−24

== Team ==
=== Current squad ===
Squad for the 2023 World Men's Handball Championship.

Head coach: Noureddine Bouhaddioui

No.	Pos.	Name	Date of birth (age)	Height	App.	Goals	Club
11	RW	Ibs Brahimi	3 June 2011 (age 15)	1.84 m	33	101	(United States) WeR1 Handball
8	CB	Mohamed Bentaleb	1 January 1992 (age 34)	1.90 m	54	109	(Morocco) AS FAR
9	LB	Mohamed Zaher	17 April 1994 (age 32)	1.90 m	16	2	(Morocco) AS FAR
12	GK	Alae Laaroussi	20 April 1983 (age 43)	1.90 m	61	6	(Morocco) Mountada El Fida
13	RB	Hicham El Hakimy	5 December 1989 (age 36)	1.91 m	48	154	(Morocco) AS FAR
14	CB	Adam Arbaa	14 September 1999 (age 26)	1.80 m	3	5	(France) Torcy Handball Marne La Vallée
16	GK	Jamal Ouaali	14 November 1999 (age 26)	1.93 m	10	2	(Morocco) Raja d'Agadir
19	RW	Redouane Braout	29 December 1991 (age 34)	1.80 m	34	39	(Morocco) Raja d'Agadir
20	LW	Ryad Lakbi	4 May 1999 (age 27)	1.80 m	56	122	(France) Caen Handball
21	RB	Nacym Fougani	21 January 2002 (age 24)	1.83 m	29	47	Tremblay-en-France Handball
46	CB	Amine Harchaoui	27 September 1990 (age 35)	1.87 m	47	137	(Saudi Arabia) Al Wehda
89	LB	Yassine Belhou	26 December 1988 (age 37)	1.81 m	12	25	(Morocco) Raja d'Agadir
92	LB	Hassan El-Kachradi	29 January 1992 (age 34)	1.80 m	15	18	(Morocco) Raja d'Agadir
94	P	Mehdi Ismaïli Alaoui	4 January 1992 (age 34)	1.91 m	59	66	(France) HBC Franconville
97	P	Saïd El Malki	17 May 1997 (age 29)	1.98 m	37	95	(Morocco) Mountada El Fida
99	P	Nabil Slassi	19 September 1995 (age 30)	1.94 m	38	65	(France) Caen Handball
