= Libya men's national handball team =

Libya

Information
- Nickname: Mediterranean Knights (فرسان المتوسط)
- Association: Libyan Handball Federation
- Coach: Reda Zeguili

Colours
1st	2nd

Results

African Championship
- Appearances: 6 (First in 2004)
- Best result: 9th (2016)
- Last updated on Unknown.

The Libya national handball team represents the country in the international handball competitions and it is controlled by the Libyan Handball Federation that is one of the African Handball Confederation members and the International Handball Federation as well.

== African Championship record ==
Year	Position
Tunisia 1974	Did not participate
Algeria 1976	Did not participate
Republic of the Congo 1979	Did not participate
Tunisia 1981	Did not participate
Egypt 1983	Did not participate
Tunisia 1985	Did not participate
Morocco 1987	Did not participate
Algeria 1989	Did not participate
Egypt 1991	Did not participate
Côte d'Ivoire 1992	Did not participate
Tunisia 1994	Did not participate
Benin 1996	Did not qualify
South Africa 1998	Did not qualify
Algeria 2000	Did not qualify
Morocco 2002	Did not qualify
Egypt 2004	10th place
Tunisia 2006	Did not qualify
Angola 2008	Did not qualify
Egypt 2010	11th place
Morocco 2012	Did not qualify
Algeria 2014	12th place
Egypt 2016	9th place
Gabon 2018	Did not qualify
Tunisia 2020	13th place
Egypt 2024	12th place
Total	6/25
