= Yahia Omar =

Egyptian handball player (born 1997)

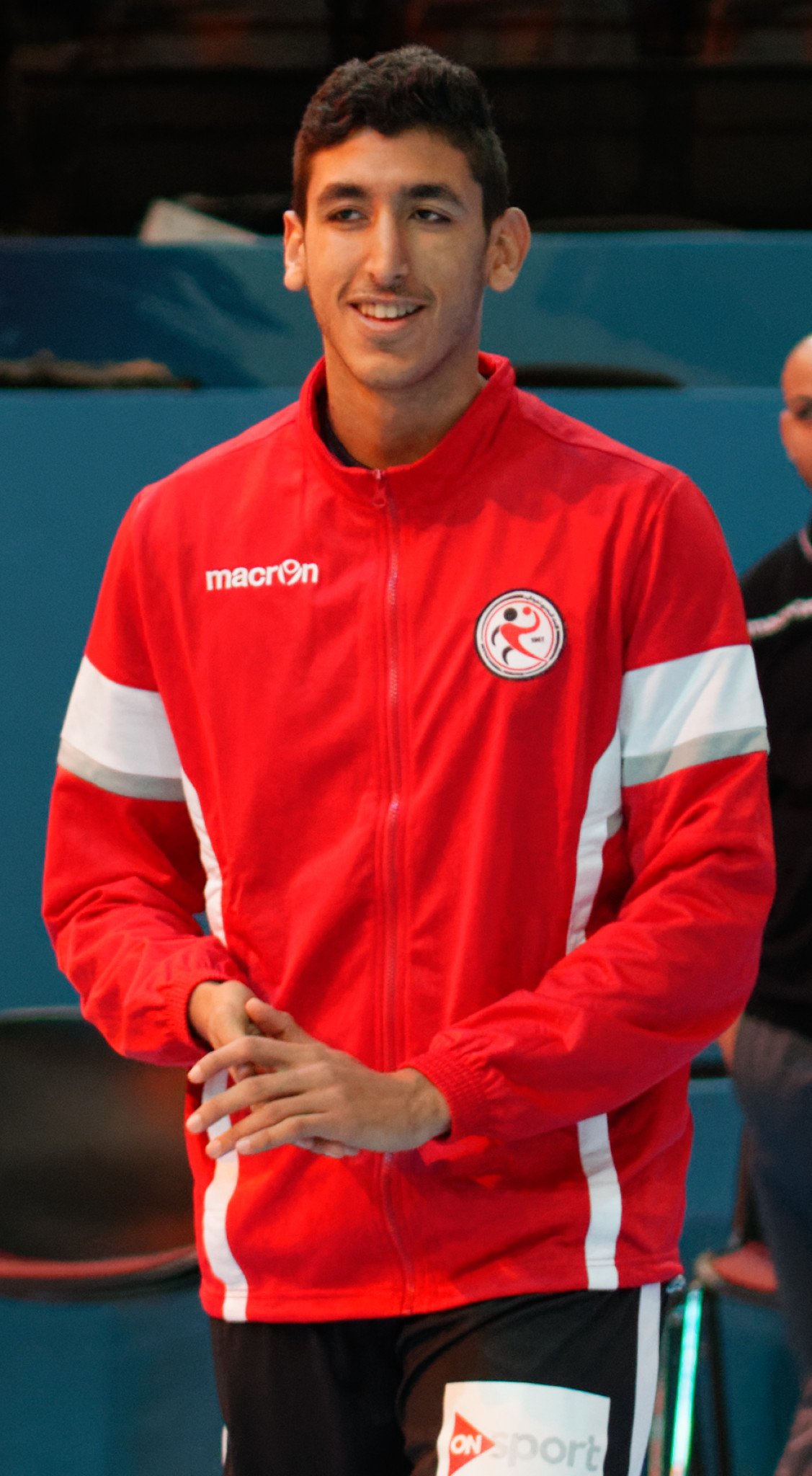
- Omar in 2017

Personal information
- Full name: Yahia Khaled Mahmoud Fathy Omar
- Nationality: Egyptian
- Born: 9 September 1997 (age 29) Giza, Egypt
- Height: 1.95 m (6 ft 5 in)

Sport
- Sport: Handball
- Position: Right back
- Current club: Paris Saint-Germain
- Number: 5

Youth career
- Years: Team
- –: Gezira Sporting Club

Senior clubs
- Years: Team
- –2017: Gezira Sporting Club
- 2016–2017: → Zamalek SC (loan)
- 2017–2021: Zamalek SC
- 2019–2021: → Telekom Veszprém (loan)
- 2021–2024: Telekom Veszprém
- 2024–: Paris Saint-Germain
National team
Years	Team	Apps	(Gls)
–	Egypt	75	(288)
Medal record
African Championship
Gold medal – first place	2020 Tunisia
Gold medal – first place	2022 Egypt
Gold medal – first place	2024 Egypt
Gold medal – first place	2026 Rwanda
Silver medal – second place	2018 Gabon
Summer Youth Olympics
Silver medal – second place	2014 Nanjing	Team
- Updated on 11 February 2025

Yahia Khaled Mahmoud Fathy Omar (Arabic: يحيى خالد محمود فتحي عمر; born 9 September 1997) is an Egyptian handball player for Paris Saint-Germain and the Egyptian national team.

He participated in the World Men's Handball Championship in 2017, 2019 and 2021, 2025 and in the 2020 Summer Olympics and 2024 Summer Olympics.

== Honours ==
Club

Zamalek SC

- Egyptian League: 2018–19
- African Champions League: 2017, 2018, 2019
- African Super Cup: 2018, 2019

Veszprém KC

- Hungarian League: 2022–23, 2023–24
- Magyar Kupa: 2020–21, 2021–22, 2022–23, 2023–24
- SEHA League: 2019–20, 2020–21, 2021–22

Paris Saint-Germain

- LNH Division 1: 2024–25, 2025–26

International

Egypt

- African Championship: 2020, 2022, 2024, 2026

Individual

- Best Right Back at Summer Olympics 2020
- MVP at 2026 African Championship
- MVP at 2024 African Championship
- MVP at 2022 African Championship
- Best Right Back at 2026 African Championship
- Best Right Back at 2022 African Championship
- Best Right Back at 2020 African Championship
- Best Right Back at SEHA League 2020–21
- Liqui Moly Starligue Player of the Month: March 2026
