= 2022 African Men's Handball Championship =

International handball competition

Tournament details
- Host country: Egypt
- Venues: 2 (in 1 host city)
- Dates: 11–18 July
- Teams: 13 (from 1 confederation)

Final positions
- Champions: Egypt (8th title)
- Runners-up: Cape Verde
- Third place: Morocco
- Fourth place: Tunisia

Tournament statistics
- Matches played: 32
- Goals scored: 1,881 (58.78 per match)

Awards
- Best player: (Egypt) Yahia Omar

The 2022 African Men's Handball Championship was the 25th edition of the African Men's Handball Championship, held from 11 to 18 July 2022 in Egypt. It acted as the African qualifying tournament for the 2023 World Men's Handball Championship in Poland and Sweden. Originally it was scheduled to be held in Morocco from 13 to 23 January 2022.

Further to the protests received by the day after the draw, the African Handball Confederation decided to postpone the competition beyond January 2022. Later the CAHB announced the resumption of the draw and the postponement of the competition first to June 2022 and finally to 11 July. On 29 March 2022, the CAHB decided to replace Morocco as the host due to a potential Algerian boycott after Morocco had proposed holding games in disputed Sahrawi territory.

Egypt won their eighth title by defeating Cape Verde 37–25 in the final. The final match marked the first since 1983 to have a sub-Saharan team, and the first where neither Tunisia or Algeria featured.

== Participating teams ==
Country	Previous appearances in tournament^{1, 2}
Algeria^{3}	23 (1976, 1979, **1981**, **1983**, **1985**, **1987**, **1989**, 1991, 1992, 1994, **1996**, 1998, 2000, 2002, 2004, 2006, 2008, 2010, 2012, **2014**, 2016, 2018, 2020)
Angola	16 (1981, 1983, 1985, 1987, 1989, 1998, 2002, 2004, 2006, 2008, 2010, 2012, 2014, 2016, 2018, 2020)
Cameroon	15 (1974, 1976, 1979, 1996, 1998, 2002, 2004, 2006, 2008, 2010, 2012, 2014, 2016, 2018, 2020)
Cape Verde	1 (2020)
DR Congo	11 (1992, 2000, 2002, 2004, 2006, 2008, 2010, 2014, 2016, 2018, 2020)
Egypt	22 (1979, 1981, 1983, 1985, 1987, 1989, **1991**, **1992**, 1994, 1996, 1998, **2000**, 2002, **2004**, 2006, **2008**, 2010, 2012, 2014, **2016**, 2018, **2020**)
Gabon	8 (2000, 2002, 2006, 2010, 2014, 2016, 2018, 2020)
Guinea	2 (1981, 2020)
Kenya	3 (2004, 2016, 2020)
Morocco	18 (1987, 1989, 1991, 1992, 1994, 1996, 1998, 2000, 2002, 2004, 2006, 2008, 2010, 2012, 2014, 2016, 2018, 2020)
Nigeria	11 (1979, 1981, 1996, 1998, 2002, 2006, 2018, 2010, 2014, 2018, 2020)
Senegal	12 (1974, 1976, 1985, 1987, 1991, 1992, 1994, 2002, 2004, 2012, 2014, 2020)
Tunisia	24 (**1974**, **1976**, **1979**, 1981, 1983, 1985, 1987, 1989, 1991, 1992, **1994**, 1996, **1998**, 2000, **2002**, 2004, **2006**, 2008, **2010**, **2012**, 2014, 2016, **2018**, 2020)
Zambia	1 (2020)

^{1} Bold indicates champion for that year.
^{2} Italic indicates host country for that year.
^{3} Algeria originally decided to boycott the competition since it is partly held in the Moroccan occupied parts of Western Sahara. However, after the tournament was moved from Morocco, they reversed their decision.

== Venues ==
6th of October City	2022 African Men's Handball Championship is located in Egypt	6th of October City
Hassan Moustafa Sports Hall	2022 African Men's Handball Championship is located in Egypt	International Hall
Capacity: 5,200	2022 African Men's Handball Championship is located in Egypt	Capacity: 2,000

== Draw ==
The draw was scheduled to take place 8 December 2021 in Abidjan, Ivory Coast. It was cancelled and a new draw was held on 26 May 2022 in Cairo.

=== Seeding ===
According to ranking of previous African Championship : 2020 African Men's Handball Championship

Pot 1	Pot 2	Pot 3	Pot 4
Egypt; Tunisia; Algeria; Angola	Cape Verde; Morocco; DR Congo; Gabon	Guinea; Nigeria; Cameroon	Kenya; Zambia; Senegal

=== Result ===
Group A	Group B	Group C	Group D
Egypt; Morocco; Cameroon	Algeria; Gabon; Guinea; Kenya	Tunisia; Cape Verde; Nigeria	Angola; DR Congo; Senegal; Zambia

== Preliminary round ==
All times are local (UTC+2).

=== Group A ===
Pos	Team	Pld	W	D	L	GF	GA	GD	Pts	Qualification
1	Egypt (H)	2	2	0	0	76	38	+38	4	Quarterfinals
2	Morocco	2	1	0	1	56	64	−8	2	Quarterfinals
3	Cameroon	2	0	0	2	45	75	−30	0	Placement round

Rules for classification: 1) points; 2) head-to-head points; 3) head-to-head goal difference; 4) head-to-head number of goals scored; 5) goal difference.
(H) Hosts

11 July 2022; 20:00	Egypt	40–17	Cameroon	Hassan Moustafa Sports Hall, 6th of October
11 July 2022; 20:00		(20–7)		Hassan Moustafa Sports Hall, 6th of October

12 July 2022; 20:00	Cameroon	28–35	Morocco	International Hall, 6th of October
12 July 2022; 20:00		(14–18)		International Hall, 6th of October

13 July 2022; 20:00	Morocco	21–36	Egypt	Hassan Moustafa Sports Hall, 6th of October
13 July 2022; 20:00		(12–18)		Hassan Moustafa Sports Hall, 6th of October

=== Group B ===
Pos	Team	Pld	W	D	L	GF	GA	GD	Pts	Qualification
1	Guinea	2	2	0	0	63	44	+19	4	Quarterfinals
2	Algeria	2	1	0	1	47	51	−4	2	Quarterfinals
3	Gabon	2	0	0	2	45	60	−15	0	Placement round
4	Kenya (Note: Kenya withdrew before the tournament.)	0	0	0	0	0	0	0	0	Withdrawn

Rules for classification: 1) points; 2) head-to-head points; 3) head-to-head goal difference; 4) head-to-head number of goals scored; 5) goal difference.
Notes:

11 July 2022; 12:30	Gabon	22–35	Guinea	International Hall, 6th of October
11 July 2022; 12:30		(11–20)		International Hall, 6th of October

12 July 2022; 15:00	Guinea	28–22	Algeria	International Hall, 6th of October
12 July 2022; 15:00		(11–14)		International Hall, 6th of October

13 July 2022; 17:30	Algeria	25–23	Gabon	Hassan Moustafa Sports Hall, 6th of October
13 July 2022; 17:30		(16–12)		Hassan Moustafa Sports Hall, 6th of October

=== Group C ===
Pos	Team	Pld	W	D	L	GF	GA	GD	Pts	Qualification
1	Tunisia	2	2	0	0	60	42	+18	4	Quarterfinals
2	Cape Verde	2	1	0	1	59	59	0	2	Quarterfinals
3	Nigeria	2	0	0	2	47	65	−18	0	Placement round

Rules for classification: 1) points; 2) head-to-head points; 3) head-to-head goal difference; 4) head-to-head number of goals scored; 5) goal difference.

11 July 2022; 12:30	Tunisia	30–18	Nigeria	Hassan Moustafa Sports Hall, 6th of October
11 July 2022; 12:30		(14–13)		Hassan Moustafa Sports Hall, 6th of October

12 July 2022; 20:00	Cape Verde	35–29	Nigeria	Hassan Moustafa Sports Hall, 6th of October
12 July 2022; 20:00		(19–15)		Hassan Moustafa Sports Hall, 6th of October

13 July 2022; 20:00	Cape Verde	24–30	Tunisia	International Hall, 6th of October
13 July 2022; 20:00		(10–14)		International Hall, 6th of October

=== Group D ===
Pos	Team	Pld	W	D	L	GF	GA	GD	Pts	Qualification
1	Angola	3	3	0	0	117	80	+37	6	Quarterfinals
2	DR Congo	3	2	0	1	105	82	+23	4	Quarterfinals
3	Senegal	3	1	0	2	98	86	+12	2	Placement round
4	Zambia	3	0	0	3	71	143	−72	0	Placement round

Rules for classification: 1) points; 2) head-to-head points; 3) head-to-head goal difference; 4) head-to-head number of goals scored; 5) goal difference.

11 July 2022; 10:00	Angola	53–24	Zambia	International Hall, 6th of October
11 July 2022; 10:00		(24–11)		International Hall, 6th of October

11 July 2022; 15:00	DR Congo	31–26	Senegal	International Hall, 6th of October
11 July 2022; 15:00		(14–15)		International Hall, 6th of October

12 July 2022; 15:00	Zambia	24–43	DR Congo	Hassan Moustafa Sports Hall, 6th of October
12 July 2022; 15:00		(14–15)		Hassan Moustafa Sports Hall, 6th of October

12 July 2022; 17:30	Senegal	25–32	Angola	Hassan Moustafa Sports Hall, 6th of October
12 July 2022; 17:30		(15–15)		Hassan Moustafa Sports Hall, 6th of October

13 July 2022; 15:00	Senegal	47–23	Zambia	International Hall, 6th of October
13 July 2022; 15:00		(17–9)		International Hall, 6th of October

13 July 2022; 17:30	Angola	32–31	DR Congo	International Hall, 6th of October
13 July 2022; 17:30		(18–16)		International Hall, 6th of October

== Placement round ==
Points gained against the team from the same group were taken over.

=== Group 1 ===
Pos	Team	Pld	W	D	L	GF	GA	GD	Pts	Qualification
1	Gabon	1	1	0	0	33	29	+4	2	Ninth place game
2	Cameroon	1	0	0	1	29	33	−4	0	Eleventh place game

Rules for classification: 1) points; 2) head-to-head points; 3) head-to-head goal difference; 4) head-to-head number of goals scored; 5) goal difference.

16 July 2022; 10:00	Cameroon	29–33	Gabon	International Hall, 6th of October
16 July 2022; 10:00		(13–18)		International Hall, 6th of October

=== Group 2 ===
Pos	Team	Pld	W	D	L	GF	GA	GD	Pts	Qualification
1	Nigeria	2	2	0	0	66	39	+27	4	Ninth place game
2	Senegal	2	1	0	1	69	54	+15	2	Eleventh place game
3	Zambia	2	0	0	2	40	82	−42	0	13th place

Rules for classification: 1) points; 2) head-to-head points; 3) head-to-head goal difference; 4) head-to-head number of goals scored; 5) goal difference.

15 July 2022; 15:00	Nigeria	35–17	Zambia	International Hall, 6th of October
15 July 2022; 15:00		(19–9)		International Hall, 6th of October

16 July 2022; 12:30	Nigeria	31–22	Senegal	International Hall, 6th of October
16 July 2022; 12:30		(13–9)		International Hall, 6th of October

=== Eleventh place game ===
17 July 2022
17:30
Cameroon
38–39
Senegal
International Hall, 6th of October

(20–17)

FT: 35–35 Pen: 3–4

=== Ninth place game ===
17 July 2022; 20:00	Gabon	27–18	Nigeria	Hassan Moustafa Sports Hall, 6th of October
17 July 2022; 20:00		(16–11)		Hassan Moustafa Sports Hall, 6th of October

== Knockout stage ==
=== Bracket ===
Quarter-finals
15 July
Guinea	24
Morocco	28
15 July
Angola	23
Cape Verde	24
15 July
Egypt	34
Algeria	19
15 July
Tunisia (OT)	40
DR Congo	34

Semi-finals
16 July
Morocco	19
Cape Verde	23
16 July
Egypt	29
Tunisia	27

Final
18 July
Cape Verde	25
Egypt	37
Third place
18 July
Morocco	28
Tunisia	24

Fifth place bracket

5–8th place semifinals
16 July
Guinea (OT)	39
Angola	36
16 July
Algeria (Pen.)	36 (4)
DR Congo	36 (3)

Fifth place
18 July
Guinea	26
Algeria	27
Seventh place
17 July
Angola	28
DR Congo	30

=== Quarterfinals ===
15 July 2022; 12:30	Guinea	24–28	Morocco	Hassan Moustafa Sports Hall, 6th of October
15 July 2022; 12:30		(13–14)		Hassan Moustafa Sports Hall, 6th of October

15 July 2022
15:00
Tunisia
40–34 (ET)
DR Congo
Hassan Moustafa Sports Hall, 6th of October

(15–16)

FT: 31–31 ET: 9–3

15 July 2022; 17:30	Angola	23–24	Cape Verde	Hassan Moustafa Sports Hall, 6th of October
15 July 2022; 17:30		(12–13)		Hassan Moustafa Sports Hall, 6th of October

15 July 2022; 20:00	Egypt	34–19	Algeria	Hassan Moustafa Sports Hall, 6th of October
15 July 2022; 20:00		(20–8)		Hassan Moustafa Sports Hall, 6th of October

=== 5–8th place semifinals ===
16 July 2022
15:00
Guinea
39–36 (ET)
Angola
International Hall, 6th of October

(15–20)

FT: 32–32 ET: 7–4

16 July 2022
17:30
Algeria
40–39 (ET)
DR Congo
International Hall, 6th of October

(11–13)

FT: 26–26 ET: 5–5, 5–5 Pen: 4–3

=== Semifinals ===
16 July 2022; 18:30	Morocco	19–23	Cape Verde	Hassan Moustafa Sports Hall, 6th of October
16 July 2022; 18:30		(9–11)		Hassan Moustafa Sports Hall, 6th of October

16 July 2022; 21:00	Egypt	29–27	Tunisia	Hassan Moustafa Sports Hall, 6th of October
16 July 2022; 21:00		(17–16)		Hassan Moustafa Sports Hall, 6th of October

=== Seventh place game ===
17 July 2022; 17:30	Angola	28–30	DR Congo	Hassan Moustafa Sports Hall, 6th of October
17 July 2022; 17:30		(13–19)		Hassan Moustafa Sports Hall, 6th of October

=== Fifth place game ===
18 July 2022; 15:30	Guinea	26–27	Algeria	Hassan Moustafa Sports Hall, 6th of October
18 July 2022; 15:30		(10–12)		Hassan Moustafa Sports Hall, 6th of October

=== Third place game ===
18 July 2022; 18:30	Morocco	28–24	Tunisia	Hassan Moustafa Sports Hall, 6th of October
18 July 2022; 18:30		(14–12)		Hassan Moustafa Sports Hall, 6th of October

=== Final ===
18 July 2022; 21:00	Cape Verde	25–37	Egypt	Hassan Moustafa Sports Hall, 6th of October
18 July 2022; 21:00		(12–24)		Hassan Moustafa Sports Hall, 6th of October

== Final ranking ==
Rank	Team
1st place, gold medalist(s)	Egypt
2nd place, silver medalist(s)	Cape Verde
3rd place, bronze medalist(s)	Morocco
4	Tunisia
5	Algeria
6	Guinea
7	DR Congo
8	Angola
9	Gabon
10	Nigeria
11	Senegal
12	Cameroon
13	Zambia

Qualified for the 2023 World Men's Handball Championship

== Awards ==
The all-star team was announced on 19 July 2022.

Position	Player
Goalkeeper	(Morocco) Alae Laaroussi
Right wing	(Morocco) Hicham El Hakimi
Right back	(Egypt) Yahia Omar
Centre back	(Cape Verde) Leandro Semedo
Left back	(Egypt) Ali Zein
Left wing	(Egypt) Omar El-Wakil
Pivot	(Tunisia) Jihed Jaballah
Top Scorer	(Democratic Republic of the Congo) Aurélien Tchitombi
MVP	(Egypt) Yahia Omar
