= Zambia men's national handball team =

Zambia

Information
- Association: Handball Association of Zambia
- Coach: Chilekwa Bwalya
- Assistant coach: Kalunga Andrew; Kalenga McBilongo

Colours
| 1st | 2nd |

Results

African Championship
- Appearances: 4 (First in 2020)
- Best result: 13th (2022)
- Last updated on Unknown.

The Zambia national handball team is the national handball team of Zambia.

== African Championship record ==
- 2020 – 16th place
- 2022 – 13th place
- 2024 – 16th place
- 2026 – 14th place
