= Guinea men's national handball team =

Guinea

Information
- Association: Guinean Handball Federation
- Coach: Kévin Decaux
- Captain: Malick Camara

Colours
1st	2nd

Results

World Championship
- Appearances: 1 (First in 2025)
- Best result: 31st (2025)

African Championship
- Appearances: 5 (First in 1981)
- Best result: 5th (2024)
- Last updated on Unknown.

The Guinea national handball team is the national handball team of Guinea.

In 2025, Guinea played at the World Men's Handball Championship for the first time in their history.

== Tournament record ==
=== World Championship ===
- 2025 – 31st place

=== African Championship ===
- 1981 – 8th place
- 2020 – 10th place
- 2022 – 6th place
- 2024 – 5th place
- 2026 – 8th place

== Current squad ==
Roster for the 2025 World Men's Handball Championship.

Head coach: (France) Kévin Decaux

No.	Pos.	Name	Date of birth (age)	Height	App.	Goals	Club
7	P	Sambou Sissoko	30 January 1991 (age 35)	1.90 m	9	24	(France) AS Neuilly-en-Thelle
10	CB	Omar Baradji	5 September 1998 (age 27)	1.96 m	17	33	(Guinea) Univers Sport de Guinée
15	P	Modibo Sidibé	15 December 1998 (age 27)	1.87 m	6	16	(France) Elite Val d'Oise Handball
17	RB	Lilian Pasquet	5 August 1996 (age 29)	1.92 m	11	57	(France) Pontault-Combault Handball
19	LW	Adjiri Corcher	19 May 1998 (age 27)	1.87 m	9	34	(France) Angers SCO
21	P	Sireoumar Diallo	30 November 1999 (age 26)	1.97 m	11	56	(Guinea) Univers Sport de Guinée
24	RB	Fenotina Doisel	26 August 1998 (age 27)	1.80 m	2	28	(France) HBC Livry-Gargan
27	RB	Victor Sawadogo	30 August 1987 (age 38)	1.85 m	5	12	(France) St Michel Cugand Handball
28	CB	Boubou Touré	29 January 1994 (age 32)	1.87 m	9	31	(France) AS Saint-Ouen-l'Aumône
29	LB	Jordan Pitre	6 April 1992 (age 33)	1.91 m	8	14	(France) Saint-Marcel Vernon HB
70	LW	Mohamed Sylla	12 December 2001 (age 24)	1.85 m	19	76	(Guinea) Espoir Olympique
77	CB	David Eponouh	1 April 1999 (age 26)	1.95 m	8	31	(France) Draguignan Var Handbal]
93	P	Makan Magassa	20 August 1990 (age 35)	1.80 m	3	27	(France) Joinville Handball
94	GK	Bryan Jabea	28 June 1992 (age 33)	1.96 m	9	0	(France) Torcy Handball Marne-la-Vallée
95	GK	Rubens Pierre	14 May 1999 (age 26)	1.95 m	4	0	Tremblay-en-France Handball
97	RW	Theo Lebon	10 December 1997 (age 28)	1.84 m	11	55	(France) US Dreux-Vernouillet
98	GK	Mohamed Camara	17 April 2002 (age 23)	1.96 m	13	0	(Guinea) Espoir Olympique
99	RB	Kalagban Oulare	26 October 2003 (age 22)	1.85 m	5	18	(Guinea) Espoir Olympique
