= Ayoub Abdi =

Algerian handball player (born 1997)

Personal information
- Nationality: Algerian
- Born: 16 February 1997 (age 29) Chlef, Algeria
- Height: 1.97 m (6 ft 6 in)

Sport
- Sport: Handball
- Position: Right back
- Current club: HBC Nantes
- Number: 8

Senior clubs
- Years: Team
- –2016: CRB Baraki
- 2016–2017: Pays d'Aix UC
- 2017–2018: CRB Baraki
- 2018–2019: Grenoble SMH38
- 2019–2024: Fenix Toulouse
- 2024–: HBC Nantes
National team
| Years | Team | Apps | (Gls) |
| 2016– | Algeria | 67 | (252) |
Medal record
African Championships
| Silver medal – second place | 2024 Egypt |
| Bronze medal – third place | 2020 Tunisia |

Ayoub Abdi (Arabic: أيوب العبدي; born 16 February 1997) is an Algerian handball player for HBC Nantes and the Algerian national team.

He competed at the 2021 World Men's Handball Championship.
