= 2016 African Men's Handball Championship =

Tournament details
- Host country: Egypt
- Venue: 1 (in 1 host city)
- Dates: 21–30 January
- Teams: 12 (from 1 confederation)

Final positions
- Champions: Egypt (6th title)
- Runners-up: Tunisia
- Third place: Angola
- Fourth place: Algeria

Tournament statistics
- Matches played: 46
- Goals scored: 2,383 (51.8 per match)

The 2016 African Men's Handball Championship was the 22nd edition of the African Men's Handball Championship and held in Egypt from 21 to 30 January 2016. It acted as the African qualifying tournament for the 2016 Summer Olympics and the 2017 World Men's Handball Championship.

Egypt won their sixth title after defeating Tunisia 21–19, while Angola defeated Algeria 25–19 to capture the bronze medal.

The win qualified Egypt for the Olympics, while runner-up Tunisia received a place in the Olympic Qualification Tournament.

== Qualified teams ==
Country	Previous appearances in tournament^{1}
Algeria	20 (1976, 1979, **1981**, **1983**, **1985**, **1987**, **1989**, 1991, 1992, 1994, **1996**, 1998, 2000, 2002, 2004, 2006, 2008, 2010, 2012, **2014**)
Angola	13 (1981, 1983, 1985, 1987, 1989, 1998, 2002, 2004, 2006, 2008, 2010, 2012, 2014)
Cameroon	12 (1974, 1976, 1979, 1996, 1998, 2002, 2004, 2006, 2008, 2010, 2012, 2014)
Congo	17 (1979, 1981, 1983, 1985, 1987, 1989, 1991, 1994, 1996, 1998, 2002, 2004, 2006, 2010, 2012, 2014)
DR Congo	9 (1992, 2000, 2002, 2004, 2006, 2008, 2010, 2012, 2014)
Egypt	19 (1979, 1981, 1983, 1985, 1987, 1989, **1991**, **1992**, 1994, 1996, 1998, **2000**, 2002, **2004**, 2006, **2008**, 2010, 2012, 2014)
Gabon	6 (2000, 2002, 2006, 2010, 2012, 2014)
Kenya	1 (2004)
Libya	3 (2004, 2010, 2014)
Morocco	16 (1987, 1989, 1991, 1992, 1994, 1996, 1998, 2000, 2002, 2004, 2006, 2008, 2010, 2012, 2014)
Nigeria	9 (1979, 1981, 1996, 1998, 2002, 2006, 2008, 2010, 2014)
Tunisia	21 (**1974**, **1976**, **1979**, 1981, 1983, 1985, 1987, 1989, 1991, 1992, **1994**, 1996, **1998**, 2000, **2002**, 2004, **2006**, 2008, **2010**, **2012**, 2014)

^{1} Bold indicates champion for that year. Italics indicates host.

== Venues ==
2016 African Men's Handball Championship is located in Egypt	Cairo	
2016 African Men's Handball Championship is located in Egypt	Cairo Stadium Indoor Halls Complex	
2016 African Men's Handball Championship is located in Egypt	Hall 1	Hall 2
2016 African Men's Handball Championship is located in Egypt	Capacity: 16,900	Capacity: 1,620

== Referees ==
7 couples were announced for the competition.

Country	Referees
Benin	Jonas Alyidi; Arseny Datundji
Benin	Akpasta Yao; Ajpeco Asinon
DR Congo	Sunguay Mobaity; Moya Koyachilis
Egypt	Mostefa Maamaly; Sami Abdelaziz
Ivory Coast	Mamado Diabite; Yalatema Coulibaly
Senegal	Abdallah Faye; Fadhel Diop
Tunisia	Ramzi Khenissi; Ismail Boualloucha

== Preliminary round ==
The draw was held on 23 October 2015.

All times are local (UTC+2).

=== Group A ===
Pos	Team	Pld	W	D	L	GF	GA	GD	Pts	Qualification
1	Egypt (H)	5	5	0	0	148	87	+61	10	Advanced to quarterfinals
2	Algeria	5	4	0	1	145	118	+27	8	Advanced to quarterfinals
3	Morocco	5	3	0	2	115	125	−10	6	Advanced to quarterfinals
4	Cameroon	5	2	0	3	120	128	−8	4	Advanced to quarterfinals
5	Nigeria	5	1	0	4	110	144	−34	2	Advanced to 9–12th place semifinals
6	Gabon	5	0	0	5	115	151	−36	0	Advanced to 9–12th place semifinals

Rules for classification: 1) points; 2) head-to-head points; 3) head-to-head goal difference; 4) head-to-head number of goals scored; 5) goal difference.
(H) Hosts

21 January 2016; 10:00	Cameroon	24–16	Nigeria	Cairo Stadium Indoor Halls Complex Hall 2, Cairo
21 January 2016; 10:00		(15–8)		Cairo Stadium Indoor Halls Complex Hall 2, Cairo

21 January 2016; 14:00	Gabon	23–29	Morocco	Cairo Stadium Indoor Halls Complex Hall 2, Cairo
21 January 2016; 14:00		(14–15)		Cairo Stadium Indoor Halls Complex Hall 2, Cairo

21 January 2016; 20:30	Algeria	18–22	Egypt	Cairo Stadium Indoor Halls Complex, Cairo
21 January 2016; 20:30		(7–11)		Cairo Stadium Indoor Halls Complex, Cairo

22 January 2016; 15:00	Gabon	24–35	Algeria	Cairo Stadium Indoor Halls Complex, Cairo
22 January 2016; 15:00	Yannick 5	(14–19)	Hamoud 7	Cairo Stadium Indoor Halls Complex, Cairo
22 January 2016; 15:00	1× (yellow card) 2× (suspension)	Report	3× (yellow card) 5× (suspension) 1× (red card)	Cairo Stadium Indoor Halls Complex, Cairo

22 January 2016; 18:00	Morocco	26–24	Cameroon	Cairo Stadium Indoor Halls Complex Hall 2, Cairo
22 January 2016; 18:00	Idir, Ouksir 7	(12–12)	Chuala 7	Cairo Stadium Indoor Halls Complex Hall 2, Cairo
22 January 2016; 18:00	4× (yellow card) 8× (suspension) 1× (red card)	Report	1× (yellow card) 8× (suspension)	Cairo Stadium Indoor Halls Complex Hall 2, Cairo

22 January 2016; 19:00	Nigeria	20–34	Egypt	Cairo Stadium Indoor Halls Complex, Cairo
22 January 2016; 19:00	Aminu 5	(9–16)	Abouebaid 6	Cairo Stadium Indoor Halls Complex, Cairo
22 January 2016; 19:00	3× (yellow card) 5× (suspension)	Report	2× (yellow card) 4× (suspension)	Cairo Stadium Indoor Halls Complex, Cairo

23 January 2016; 16:00	Nigeria	31–30	Gabon	Cairo Stadium Indoor Halls Complex Hall 2, Cairo
23 January 2016; 16:00	Talle 7	(16–13)	Cherubin 7	Cairo Stadium Indoor Halls Complex Hall 2, Cairo
23 January 2016; 16:00	2× (yellow card) 6× (suspension)	Report	3× (yellow card) 4× (suspension)	Cairo Stadium Indoor Halls Complex Hall 2, Cairo

23 January 2016; 17:00	Algeria	27–22	Morocco	Cairo Stadium Indoor Halls Complex, Cairo
23 January 2016; 17:00	Daoud, Abdi 6	(15–10)	Idir 8	Cairo Stadium Indoor Halls Complex, Cairo
23 January 2016; 17:00	4× (yellow card) 7× (suspension)	Report	4× (yellow card) 4× (suspension)	Cairo Stadium Indoor Halls Complex, Cairo

23 January 2016; 19:00	Egypt	30–20	Cameroon	Cairo Stadium Indoor Halls Complex, Cairo
23 January 2016; 19:00	Abdelrahman 4	(17–10)	Ebanga 4	Cairo Stadium Indoor Halls Complex, Cairo
23 January 2016; 19:00	4× (yellow card) 6× (suspension) 1× (red card)	Report	3× (yellow card) 8× (suspension)	Cairo Stadium Indoor Halls Complex, Cairo

25 January 2016; 13:00	Cameroon	27–34	Algeria	Cairo Stadium Indoor Halls Complex, Cairo
25 January 2016; 13:00		(11–16)		Cairo Stadium Indoor Halls Complex, Cairo

25 January 2016; 18:00	Morocco	25–20	Nigeria	Cairo Stadium Indoor Halls Complex Hall 2, Cairo
25 January 2016; 18:00		(14–10)		Cairo Stadium Indoor Halls Complex Hall 2, Cairo

25 January 2016; 19:00	Egypt	31–16	Gabon	Cairo Stadium Indoor Halls Complex, Cairo
25 January 2016; 19:00		(13–7)		Cairo Stadium Indoor Halls Complex, Cairo

26 January 2016; 13:00	Algeria	31–23	Nigeria	Cairo Stadium Indoor Halls Complex, Cairo
26 January 2016; 13:00		(11–12)		Cairo Stadium Indoor Halls Complex, Cairo

26 January 2016; 15:00	Cameroon	25–22	Gabon	Cairo Stadium Indoor Halls Complex, Cairo
26 January 2016; 15:00		(10–10)		Cairo Stadium Indoor Halls Complex, Cairo

26 January 2016; 19:00	Egypt	31–13	Morocco	Cairo Stadium Indoor Halls Complex, Cairo
26 January 2016; 19:00		(19–7)		Cairo Stadium Indoor Halls Complex, Cairo

=== Group B ===
Pos	Team	Pld	W	D	L	GF	GA	GD	Pts	Qualification
1	Tunisia	5	5	0	0	187	96	+91	10	Advanced to quarterfinals
2	Angola	5	4	0	1	148	104	+44	8	Advanced to quarterfinals
3	DR Congo	5	3	0	2	131	143	−12	6	Advanced to quarterfinals
4	Congo	5	1	1	3	130	142	−12	3 (Note: Congo 21–21 Libya)	Advanced to quarterfinals
5	Libya	5	1	1	3	103	122	−19	3	Advanced to 9–12th place semifinals
6	Kenya	5	0	0	5	102	194	−92	0	Advanced to 9–12th place semifinals

Rules for classification: 1) points; 2) head-to-head points; 3) head-to-head goal difference; 4) head-to-head number of goals scored; 5) goal difference.
Notes:

21 January 2016; 09:00	Angola	42–16	Kenya	Cairo Stadium Indoor Halls Complex, Cairo
21 January 2016; 09:00		(20–6)		Cairo Stadium Indoor Halls Complex, Cairo

21 January 2016; 11:00	Tunisia	30–18	Libya	Cairo Stadium Indoor Halls Complex, Cairo
21 January 2016; 11:00		(16–7)		Cairo Stadium Indoor Halls Complex, Cairo

21 January 2016; 12:00	Congo	29–30	DR Congo	Cairo Stadium Indoor Halls Complex Hall 2, Cairo
21 January 2016; 12:00		(14–15)		Cairo Stadium Indoor Halls Complex Hall 2, Cairo

22 January 2016; 13:00	Libya	15–29	Angola	Cairo Stadium Indoor Halls Complex, Cairo
22 January 2016; 13:00	El Badri, Shafu 3	(8–12)	Liandro 7	Cairo Stadium Indoor Halls Complex, Cairo
22 January 2016; 13:00	3× (yellow card) 6× (suspension)	Report	2× (yellow card) 3× (suspension)	Cairo Stadium Indoor Halls Complex, Cairo

22 January 2016; 16:00	Kenya	19–34	Congo	Cairo Stadium Indoor Halls Complex Hall 2, Cairo
22 January 2016; 16:00	three players 3	(9–17)	Ephrem 7	Cairo Stadium Indoor Halls Complex Hall 2, Cairo
22 January 2016; 16:00	2× (yellow card) 1× (suspension)	Report	3× (yellow card) 7× (suspension)	Cairo Stadium Indoor Halls Complex Hall 2, Cairo

22 January 2016; 17:00	DR Congo	22–37	Tunisia	Cairo Stadium Indoor Halls Complex, Cairo
22 January 2016; 17:00	Eyanga, Tchitombi 4	(14–15)	Amri 8	Cairo Stadium Indoor Halls Complex, Cairo
22 January 2016; 17:00	3× (yellow card) 5× (suspension)	Report	2× (yellow card) 5× (suspension) 1× (red card)	Cairo Stadium Indoor Halls Complex, Cairo

23 January 2016; 13:00	Tunisia	53–15	Kenya	Cairo Stadium Indoor Halls Complex, Cairo
23 January 2016; 13:00	Bhar 16	(24–8)	Mathew, Ondara 3	Cairo Stadium Indoor Halls Complex, Cairo
23 January 2016; 13:00	2× (yellow card) 3× (suspension)	Report	1× (yellow card) 2× (suspension)	Cairo Stadium Indoor Halls Complex, Cairo

23 January 2016; 15:00	Angola	28–26	Congo	Cairo Stadium Indoor Halls Complex, Cairo
23 January 2016; 15:00		(15–9)		Cairo Stadium Indoor Halls Complex, Cairo

23 January 2016; 18:00	Libya	19–20	DR Congo	Cairo Stadium Indoor Halls Complex Hall 2, Cairo
23 January 2016; 18:00	four players 4	(11–10)	Kiangebeni 6	Cairo Stadium Indoor Halls Complex Hall 2, Cairo
23 January 2016; 18:00	4× (yellow card) 12× (suspension) 1× (red card)	Report	3× (yellow card) 3× (suspension)	Cairo Stadium Indoor Halls Complex Hall 2, Cairo

25 January 2016; 15:00	Angola	28–24	DR Congo	Cairo Stadium Indoor Halls Complex, Cairo
25 January 2016; 15:00		(20–13)		Cairo Stadium Indoor Halls Complex, Cairo

25 January 2016; 16:00	Kenya	22–30	Libya	Cairo Stadium Indoor Halls Complex Hall 2, Cairo
25 January 2016; 16:00		(11–19)		Cairo Stadium Indoor Halls Complex Hall 2, Cairo

25 January 2016; 17:00	Congo	20–44	Tunisia	Cairo Stadium Indoor Halls Complex, Cairo
25 January 2016; 17:00		(8–23)		Cairo Stadium Indoor Halls Complex, Cairo

26 January 2016; 16:00	Congo	21–21	Libya	Cairo Stadium Indoor Halls Complex Hall 2, Cairo
26 January 2016; 16:00		(6–11)		Cairo Stadium Indoor Halls Complex Hall 2, Cairo

26 January 2016; 17:00	Tunisia	23–21	Angola	Cairo Stadium Indoor Halls Complex, Cairo
26 January 2016; 17:00		(10–13)		Cairo Stadium Indoor Halls Complex, Cairo

26 January 2016; 18:00	DR Congo	35–30	Kenya	Cairo Stadium Indoor Halls Complex Hall 2, Cairo
26 January 2016; 18:00		(15–12)		Cairo Stadium Indoor Halls Complex Hall 2, Cairo

== Knockout stage ==
Quarterfinals
27 January
Egypt	39
Congo	18
27 January
Angola	22
Morocco	21
27 January
Algeria	34
DR Congo	25
27 January
Tunisia	24
Cameroon	20

Semifinals
29 January
Egypt	25
Angola	15
29 January
Algeria	18
Tunisia	27

Final
30 January
Egypt	21
Tunisia	19
Third place
30 January
Angola	24
Algeria	19

5th place bracket

5–8th place semifinals
29 January
Congo	28
Morocco	36
29 January
DR Congo	27
Cameroon	36

Fifth place
30 January
Morocco	29
Cameroon	30
Seventh place
30 January
Congo	25
DR Congo	26

9th place bracket

9–12th place semifinals
27 January
Nigeria	32
Kenya	23
27 January
Libya	29
Gabon	26

Ninth place
29 January
Nigeria	26
Libya	28
Eleventh place
29 January
Kenya	19
Gabon	38

=== Quarterfinals ===
27 January 2016; 13:00	Angola	22–21	Morocco	Cairo Stadium Indoor Halls Complex, Cairo
27 January 2016; 13:00		(9–9)		Cairo Stadium Indoor Halls Complex, Cairo

27 January 2016; 15:00	Tunisia	24–20	Cameroon	Cairo Stadium Indoor Halls Complex, Cairo
27 January 2016; 15:00		(11–10)		Cairo Stadium Indoor Halls Complex, Cairo

27 January 2016; 17:00	Algeria	34–25	DR Congo	Cairo Stadium Indoor Halls Complex, Cairo
27 January 2016; 17:00		(16–13)		Cairo Stadium Indoor Halls Complex, Cairo

27 January 2016; 19:00	Egypt	39–18	Congo	Cairo Stadium Indoor Halls Complex, Cairo
27 January 2016; 19:00		(19–6)		Cairo Stadium Indoor Halls Complex, Cairo

=== 9–12th place semifinals ===
27 January 2016; 16:00	Libya	29–26	Gabon	Cairo Stadium Indoor Halls Complex Hall 2, Cairo
27 January 2016; 16:00		(12–12)		Cairo Stadium Indoor Halls Complex Hall 2, Cairo

27 January 2016; 18:00	Nigeria	32–23	Kenya	Cairo Stadium Indoor Halls Complex Hall 2, Cairo
27 January 2016; 18:00		(16–11)		Cairo Stadium Indoor Halls Complex Hall 2, Cairo

=== 5–8th place semifinals ===
29 January 2016; 16:00	Congo	28–36	Morocco	Cairo Stadium Indoor Halls Complex Hall 2, Cairo
29 January 2016; 16:00		(12–15)		Cairo Stadium Indoor Halls Complex Hall 2, Cairo

29 January 2016; 18:00	DR Congo	27–36	Cameroon	Cairo Stadium Indoor Halls Complex Hall 2, Cairo
29 January 2016; 18:00		(15–18)		Cairo Stadium Indoor Halls Complex Hall 2, Cairo

=== Semifinals ===
29 January 2016; 17:30	Algeria	18–27	Tunisia	Cairo Stadium Indoor Halls Complex, Cairo
29 January 2016; 17:30		(9–13)		Cairo Stadium Indoor Halls Complex, Cairo

29 January 2016; 20:00	Egypt	25–15	Angola	Cairo Stadium Indoor Halls Complex, Cairo
29 January 2016; 20:00		(12–8)		Cairo Stadium Indoor Halls Complex, Cairo

=== Eleventh place game ===
29 January 2016; 13:00	Kenya	19–38	Gabon	Cairo Stadium Indoor Halls Complex, Cairo

=== Ninth place game ===
29 January 2016; 14:00	Nigeria	26–28	Libya	Cairo Stadium Indoor Halls Complex Hall 2, Cairo

=== Seventh place game ===
30 January 2016; 12:00	Congo	25–26	DR Congo	Cairo Stadium Indoor Halls Complex Hall 2, Cairo

=== Fifth place game ===
30 January 2016; 14:00	Morocco	29–30	Cameroon	Cairo Stadium Indoor Halls Complex Hall 2, Cairo
30 January 2016; 14:00		(13–17)		Cairo Stadium Indoor Halls Complex Hall 2, Cairo

=== Third place game ===
30 January 2016; 17:30	Angola	24–19	Algeria	Cairo Stadium Indoor Halls Complex, Cairo
30 January 2016; 17:30		(10–8)		Cairo Stadium Indoor Halls Complex, Cairo

=== Final ===
30 January 2016; 20:00	Egypt	21–19	Tunisia	Cairo Stadium Indoor Halls Complex, Cairo
30 January 2016; 20:00		(9–10)		Cairo Stadium Indoor Halls Complex, Cairo

== Final ranking ==
Legend for qualification type
Qualified for the 2016 Summer Olympics and the 2017 World Championship
Qualified for the 2016 Summer Olympics Qualification and the 2017 World Championship
Qualified for the 2017 World Championship

Rank	Team
Gold medal	Egypt
Silver medal	Tunisia
Bronze medal	Angola
4	Algeria
5	Cameroon
6	Morocco
7	DR Congo
8	Congo
9	Libya
10	Nigeria
11	Gabon
12	Kenya
