= 2018 African Men's Handball Championship =

Tournament details
- Host country: Gabon
- Venue(s): 1 (in 1 host city)
- Dates: 17–27 January
- Teams: 10 (from 1 confederation)

Final positions
- Champions: Tunisia (10th title)
- Runner-up: Egypt
- Third place: Angola
- Fourth place: Morocco

Tournament statistics
- Matches played: 33
- Goals scored: 1,740 (52.73 per match)

The 2018 African Men's Handball Championship was the 23rd edition of the African Men's Handball Championship and held from 17 to 27 January 2018 in Gabon. It acted as the African qualifying tournament for the 2019 World Men's Handball Championship.

Tunisia won their tenth title after beating Egypt 26–24 in the final.

== Qualified teams ==
Country	Previous appearances in tournament^{1}
Algeria	21 (1976, 1979, **1981**, **1983**, **1985**, **1987**, **1989**, 1991, 1992, 1994, **1996**, 1998, 2000, 2002, 2004, 2006, 2008, 2010, 2012, **2014**, 2016)
Angola	14 (1981, 1983, 1985, 1987, 1989, 1998, 2002, 2004, 2006, 2008, 2010, 2012, 2014, 2016)
Cameroon	13 (1974, 1976, 1979, 1996, 1998, 2002, 2004, 2006, 2008, 2010, 2012, 2014, 2016)
Congo	18 (1979, 1981, 1983, 1985, 1987, 1989, 1991, 1994, 1996, 1998, 2002, 2004, 2006, 2010, 2012, 2014, 2016)
DR Congo	10 (1992, 2000, 2002, 2004, 2006, 2008, 2010, 2012, 2014, 2016)
Egypt	20 (1979, 1981, 1983, 1985, 1987, 1989, **1991**, **1992**, 1994, 1996, 1998, **2000**, 2002, **2004**, 2006, **2008**, 2010, 2012, 2014, **2016**)
Gabon	7 (2000, 2002, 2006, 2010, 2012, 2014, 2016)
Morocco	17 (1987, 1989, 1991, 1992, 1994, 1996, 1998, 2000, 2002, 2004, 2006, 2008, 2010, 2012, 2014, 2016)
Nigeria	10 (1979, 1981, 1996, 1998, 2002, 2006, 2008, 2010, 2014, 2016)
Tunisia	22 (**1974**, **1976**, **1979**, 1981, 1983, 1985, 1987, 1989, 1991, 1992, **1994**, 1996, **1998**, 2000, **2002**, 2004, **2006**, 2008, **2010**, **2012**, 2014, 2016)

^{1} Bold indicates champion for that year
^{2} Italic indicates host country for that year

== Venue ==
Libreville	2018 African Men's Handball Championship is located in Gabon
Palais des Sports de Libreville	2018 African Men's Handball Championship is located in Gabon
Capacity: 6,000	2018 African Men's Handball Championship is located in Gabon

== Preliminary round ==
The draw was held on 3 November 2017 in Libreville.

All times are local (UTC+1).

=== Group A ===
Pos	Team	Pld	W	D	L	GF	GA	GD	Pts	Qualification
1	Tunisia	4	3	1	0	120	89	+31	7	Quarterfinals
2	Gabon (H)	4	2	1	1	97	103	−6	5 (Note: Algeria 25–26 Gabon)	Quarterfinals
3	Algeria	4	2	1	1	114	105	+9	5	Quarterfinals
4	Congo	4	1	0	3	105	118	−13	2	Quarterfinals
5	Cameroon	4	0	1	3	100	121	−21	1	

Rules for classification: 1) points; 2) head-to-head points; 3) head-to-head goal difference; 4) head-to-head number of goals scored; 5) goal difference.
(H) Hosts
Notes:

17 January 2018; 11:00	Algeria	31–23	Cameroon	Palais des Sports de Libreville, Libreville
17 January 2018; 11:00		(18–13)		Palais des Sports de Libreville, Libreville

17 January 2018; 18:30	Gabon	27–22	Congo	Palais des Sports de Libreville, Libreville
17 January 2018; 18:30		(14–12)		Palais des Sports de Libreville, Libreville

18 January 2018; 13:00	Cameroon	26–32	Tunisia	Palais des Sports de Libreville, Libreville
18 January 2018; 13:00		(14–15)		Palais des Sports de Libreville, Libreville

18 January 2018; 19:00	Algeria	25–26	Gabon	Palais des Sports de Libreville, Libreville
18 January 2018; 19:00		(12–16)		Palais des Sports de Libreville, Libreville

19 January 2018; 15:00	Congo	31–33	Algeria	Palais des Sports de Libreville, Libreville
19 January 2018; 15:00		(14–19)		Palais des Sports de Libreville, Libreville

19 January 2018; 19:00	Gabon	15–27	Tunisia	Palais des Sports de Libreville, Libreville
19 January 2018; 19:00		(6–11)		Palais des Sports de Libreville, Libreville

21 January 2018; 15:00	Cameroon	22–29	Congo	Palais des Sports de Libreville, Libreville
21 January 2018; 15:00		(10–11)		Palais des Sports de Libreville, Libreville

21 January 2018; 17:00	Tunisia	25–25	Algeria	Palais des Sports de Libreville, Libreville
21 January 2018; 17:00		(13–11)		Palais des Sports de Libreville, Libreville

22 January 2018; 13:00	Tunisia	36–23	Congo	Palais des Sports de Libreville, Libreville
22 January 2018; 13:00		(19–8)		Palais des Sports de Libreville, Libreville

22 January 2018; 19:00	Cameroon	29–29	Gabon	Palais des Sports de Libreville, Libreville
22 January 2018; 19:00		(15–16)		Palais des Sports de Libreville, Libreville

=== Group B ===
Pos	Team	Pld	W	D	L	GF	GA	GD	Pts	Qualification
1	Egypt	4	4	0	0	121	97	+24	8	Quarterfinals
2	Angola	4	3	0	1	109	85	+24	6	Quarterfinals
3	Morocco	4	2	0	2	106	116	−10	4	Quarterfinals
4	DR Congo	4	1	0	3	106	118	−12	2	Quarterfinals
5	Nigeria	4	0	0	4	82	108	−26	0	

Rules for classification: 1) points; 2) head-to-head points; 3) head-to-head goal difference; 4) head-to-head number of goals scored; 5) goal difference.

17 January 2018; 09:00	Angola	29–16	Nigeria	Palais des Sports de Libreville, Libreville
17 January 2018; 09:00		(13–5)		Palais des Sports de Libreville, Libreville

17 January 2018; 13:00	Morocco	28–33	Egypt	Palais des Sports de Libreville, Libreville
17 January 2018; 13:00		(15–17)		Palais des Sports de Libreville, Libreville

18 January 2018; 15:00	DR Congo	23–28	Angola	Palais des Sports de Libreville, Libreville
18 January 2018; 15:00		(8–13)		Palais des Sports de Libreville, Libreville

18 January 2018; 17:00	Nigeria	22–27	Egypt	Palais des Sports de Libreville, Libreville
18 January 2018; 17:00		(10–12)		Palais des Sports de Libreville, Libreville

19 January 2018; 13:00	DR Congo	28–21	Nigeria	Palais des Sports de Libreville, Libreville
19 January 2018; 13:00		(13–11)		Palais des Sports de Libreville, Libreville

19 January 2018; 17:00	Angola	32–21	Morocco	Palais des Sports de Libreville, Libreville
19 January 2018; 17:00		(14–12)		Palais des Sports de Libreville, Libreville

21 January 2018; 13:00	Morocco	33–28	DR Congo	Palais des Sports de Libreville, Libreville
21 January 2018; 13:00		(18–13)		Palais des Sports de Libreville, Libreville

21 January 2018; 19:00	Egypt	25–20	Angola	Palais des Sports de Libreville, Libreville
21 January 2018; 19:00		(13–9)		Palais des Sports de Libreville, Libreville

22 January 2018; 15:00	Morocco	24–23	Nigeria	Palais des Sports de Libreville, Libreville
22 January 2018; 15:00		(7–13)		Palais des Sports de Libreville, Libreville

22 January 2018; 17:00	Egypt	36–27	DR Congo	Palais des Sports de Libreville, Libreville
22 January 2018; 17:00		(19–7)		Palais des Sports de Libreville, Libreville

== Knockout stage ==
=== Bracket ===
Quarter-finals
24 January
Tunisia	38
DR Congo	21
24 January
Angola	29
Algeria	27
24 January
Gabon	23
Morocco (OT)	26
24 January
Egypt	37
Congo	22

Semi-finals
25 January
Tunisia	34
Angola	14
25 January
Morocco	19
Egypt	31

Final
27 January
Tunisia	26
Egypt	24
Third place
27 January
Angola	29
Morocco	26

Fifth place bracket

5–8th place semifinals
25 January
DR Congo	24
Algeria	29
25 January
Gabon	31
Congo	30

Fifth place
27 January
Algeria	23
Gabon	24
Seventh place
27 January
DR Congo	23
Congo	24

=== Quarterfinals ===
24 January 2018; 13:00	Tunisia	38–21	DR Congo	Palais des Sports de Libreville, Libreville
24 January 2018; 13:00		(21–12)		Palais des Sports de Libreville, Libreville

24 January 2018; 15:00	Angola	29–27	Algeria	Palais des Sports de Libreville, Libreville
24 January 2018; 15:00		(13–12)		Palais des Sports de Libreville, Libreville

24 January 2018; 17:00	Congo	22–37	Egypt	Palais des Sports de Libreville, Libreville
24 January 2018; 17:00		(15–18)		Palais des Sports de Libreville, Libreville

24 January 2018
19:00
Gabon
23–26 (ET)
Morocco
Palais des Sports de Libreville, Libreville

(9–11)

FT: 20–20 ET: 3–6

=== 5–8th place semifinals ===
25 January 2018; 13:00	DR Congo	24–29	Algeria	Palais des Sports de Libreville, Libreville
25 January 2018; 13:00		(14–15)		Palais des Sports de Libreville, Libreville

25 January 2018; 15:00	Gabon	31–30	Congo	Palais des Sports de Libreville, Libreville
25 January 2018; 15:00		(16–20)		Palais des Sports de Libreville, Libreville

=== Semifinals ===
25 January 2018; 17:00	Tunisia	34–14	Angola	Palais des Sports de Libreville, Libreville
25 January 2018; 17:00		(16–3)		Palais des Sports de Libreville, Libreville

25 January 2018; 19:00	Morocco	19–31	Egypt	Palais des Sports de Libreville, Libreville
25 January 2018; 19:00		(4–14)		Palais des Sports de Libreville, Libreville

=== Ninth place game ===
25 January 2018; 11:00	Cameroon	27–19	Nigeria	Palais des Sports de Libreville, Libreville
25 January 2018; 11:00		(16–10)		Palais des Sports de Libreville, Libreville

=== Seventh place game ===
27 January 2018; 09:00	DR Congo	23–24	Congo	Palais des Sports de Libreville, Libreville
27 January 2018; 09:00		(10–9)		Palais des Sports de Libreville, Libreville

=== Fifth place game ===
27 January 2018; 11:00	Algeria	23–24	Gabon	Palais des Sports de Libreville, Libreville
27 January 2018; 11:00		(14–9)		Palais des Sports de Libreville, Libreville

=== Third place game ===
27 January 2018; 13:00	Angola	29–26	Morocco	Palais des Sports de Libreville, Libreville
27 January 2018; 13:00		(17–13)		Palais des Sports de Libreville, Libreville

=== Final ===
27 January 2018; 19:00	Tunisia	26–24	Egypt	Palais des Sports de Libreville, Libreville
27 January 2018; 19:00		(13–15)		Palais des Sports de Libreville, Libreville

== Final ranking ==
Qualified for the 2019 World Championship

Rank	Team
Gold medal	Tunisia
Silver medal	Egypt
Bronze medal	Angola
4	Morocco
5	Gabon
6	Algeria
7	Congo
8	DR Congo
9	Cameroon
10	Nigeria
