= 1981 African Men's Handball Championship =

International handball competition

1981 African Men's Championship
Tournament details
- Host country: Tunisia
- Venue(s): 1 (in 1 host city)
- Dates: 18 July – 1 August
- Teams: 8 (from 1 confederation)

Final positions
- Champions: Algeria (1st title)
- Runners-up: Ivory Coast
- Third place: Tunisia
- Fourth place: Egypt

The 1981 African Men's Handball Championship was the fourth edition of the African Men's Handball Championship, held in Tunis, Tunisia, from 18 July to 1 August 1981. It acted as the African qualifying tournament for the 1982 World Championship in West Germany.

In the final, Algeria won their first title beating Ivory Coast in the final game.

== Qualified teams ==
- Algeria
- Angola
- Congo
- Egypt
- Guinea
- Ivory Coast
- Nigeria
- Tunisia (hosts)

== Venue ==
- El Menzah Sports Palace, Tunis

== Draw ==
Group A	Group B	Group C
Angola; Congo; Libya; Tunisia	Egypt; Guinea; Nigeria	Algeria; Central African Republic; Ivory Coast

== Group stage ==
Team advance to the knockout stage

=== Group A ===
Team	Pld	W	D	L	GF	GA	GD	Pts
Tunisia	0	0	0	0	0	0	0	0
Angola	0	0	0	0	0	0	0	0
Guinea	0	0	0	0	0	0	0	0

Tunisia	–	Angola	Tunis

Tunisia	–	Guinea	Tunis

== Knockout stage ==
=== Third place game ===
31 July 1981	Tunisia	–	Egypt	Tunis

=== Final ===
1 August 1981	Algeria	30–25	Ivory Coast	Tunis

== Final ranking ==
Team qualified for the 1982 World Championship

Rank	Team
Gold medal	Algeria
Silver medal	Ivory Coast
Bronze medal	Tunisia
4	Egypt
5	Angola
6	Nigeria
7	Congo
8	Guinea
