= 2026 IHF Men's Club World Championship =

Club handball world championship

2026 IHF Men’s Club World Championship
Tournament details
- Host country: Egypt
- Venue: 1 (in 1 host city)
- Dates: 24 September – 1 October
- Teams: 10 (from 6 confederations)

Final positions
- Champions: (Hungary) Veszprém (2nd title)
- Runners-up: (Spain) FC Barcelona
- Third place: (Egypt) Al Ahly
- Fourth place: (Egypt) Zamalek SC

Tournament statistics
- Matches played: 20
- Goals scored: 1,191 (59.55 per match)
- Attendance: 18,345 (917 per match)
- Top scorers: Hugo Descat (Veszprém) (35 goals)

Awards
- Best player: Emil Nielsen (Veszprém)

‌The 2026 IHF Men's Club World Championship was the 19th edition of the yearly club world championship in handball, held from 25 September to 1 October 2026 in New Administrative Capital, Egypt under the aegis of the International Handball Federation (IHF).

Telekom Veszprém won their second title after a win over FC Barcelona, in a rematch of the previous editions final.

== Host ==
The Egyptian Handball Federation received a contract for three editions, starting in 2024. The tournament was held in the New Capital Sports Hall in New Administrative Capital.

== Format ==
Six teams were seeded directly into the group stage, while the other four teams played a preliminary qualification, with the winners advancing and the losers playing placement games. In the group stage there were two groups of four teams, playing a round robin. After the group stage, the top team from each group played the final, the second-placed teams played for the third place and so on.

== Teams ==
Ten teams competed in the tournament: the continental representatives, the defending champion, the host team and two wild card teams.

Team	Qualified as
(Spain) FC Barcelona	Defending champion (and winner of EHF Champions League)
(Morocco) Mountada Derb Sultan	
(Kuwait) Burgan SC	Winner of 2026 Asian Club League Championship
(Australia) Sydney University HC	Winner of 2026 Oceania Champions Cup
(United States) Los Angeles THC	Winner of 2026 North American and Caribbean Championship
(Brazil) EC Pinheiros	Winner of 2026 South and Central American Championship
(Germany) Füchse Berlin	Runner-up of EHF Champions League
(Egypt) Al Ahly	Host
(Hungary) Veszprém KC	Wildcard
(Egypt) Zamalek SC	Wildcard

== Draw ==
The draw was held on 22 July 2026.

=== Seeding ===
Preliminary qualification

Pot 1	Pot 2
(United States) Los Angeles THC (Australia) Sydney University HC	(Egypt) Zamalek SC (Hungary) Veszprém

Group stage

Pot 1	Pot 2	Pot 3	Pot 4
(Spain) FC Barcelona (Germany) Füchse Berlin	(Egypt) Al Ahly (Morocco) Mountada Derb Sultan	(Kuwait) Burgan SC (Brazil) EC Pinheiros	PQ 1 winner PQ 2 winner

All times are local (UTC+3).

== Referees ==
The referee pairs were announced on 31 July 2026.

Referees
Czech Republic	Václav Horáček; Jiří Novotný
Denmark	Madas Hansen; Jesper Madsen
Egypt	Mahmoud El-Beltagy; Alaa Emam
France	Karim Gasmi; Raouf Gasmi

Referees
Germany	Tanja Kuttler; Maike Merz
Montenegro	Ivan Pavićević; Miloš Ražnatović
Spain	Ignacio García; Andreu Marín
Uruguay	Cristian Lemes; Mathías Sosa

== Preliminary qualification ==
24 September 2026; 17:30	Sydney University HC (Australia)	19–45	(Hungary) Veszprém	Sports Hall, The New Capital; Attendance: 220; Referees: El-Beltagy, Emam (EGY)
24 September 2026; 17:30	Naser 5	(6–25)	Gáncs-Pető 13	Sports Hall, The New Capital; Attendance: 220; Referees: El-Beltagy, Emam (EGY)
24 September 2026; 17:30	2× (suspension)	Report	1× (yellow card) 3× (suspension)	Sports Hall, The New Capital; Attendance: 220; Referees: El-Beltagy, Emam (EGY)

24 September 2026; 20:00	Los Angeles THC (United States)	17–40	(Egypt) Zamalek SC	Sports Hall, The New Capital; Attendance: 1,000; Referees: Lemes, Sosa (URU)
24 September 2026; 20:00	Velkavrh 6	(11–21)	Massoud 9	Sports Hall, The New Capital; Attendance: 1,000; Referees: Lemes, Sosa (URU)
24 September 2026; 20:00	4× (suspension)	Report	1× (yellow card) 1× (suspension)	Sports Hall, The New Capital; Attendance: 1,000; Referees: Lemes, Sosa (URU)

== Group stage ==
=== Group A ===
Pos	Team	Pld	W	D	L	GF	GA	GD	Pts	Qualification
1	(Spain) FC Barcelona	3	3	0	0	134	77	+57	6	Final
2	(Egypt) Zamalek SC	3	2	0	1	99	83	+16	4	Third place game
3	(Brazil) EC Pinheiros	3	1	0	2	97	94	+3	2	Fifth place game
4	(Morocco) Mountada Derb Sultan	3	0	0	3	54	130	−76	0	Seventh place game

Source: IHF
Rules for classification: 1) points; 2) head-to-head points; 3) head-to-head goal difference; 4) head-to-head number of goals scored; 5) goal difference.

25 September 2026; 13:15	EC Pinheiros (Brazil)	33–44	(Spain) FC Barcelona	Sports Hall, The New Capital; Attendance: 150; Referees: Pavićević, Ražnatović (MNE)
25 September 2026; 13:15	Lima, Reis 6	(16–23)	Mem 11	Sports Hall, The New Capital; Attendance: 150; Referees: Pavićević, Ražnatović (MNE)
25 September 2026; 13:15	1× (yellow card) 2× (suspension)	Report	1× (yellow card) 2× (suspension)	Sports Hall, The New Capital; Attendance: 150; Referees: Pavićević, Ražnatović (MNE)

25 September 2026; 15:30	Mountada Derb Sultan (Morocco)	17–42	(Egypt) Zamalek SC	Sports Hall, The New Capital; Attendance: 300; Referees: Hansen, Madsen (DEN)
25 September 2026; 15:30	Bentaleb, Malki 4	(8–20)	Aly 10	Sports Hall, The New Capital; Attendance: 300; Referees: Hansen, Madsen (DEN)
25 September 2026; 15:30	1× (suspension)	Report	1× (yellow card) 1× (suspension)	Sports Hall, The New Capital; Attendance: 300; Referees: Hansen, Madsen (DEN)

27 September 2026; 13:15	Mountada Derb Sultan (Morocco)	22–37	(Brazil) EC Pinheiros	Sports Hall, The New Capital; Attendance: 150; Referees: Kuttler, Merz (GER)
27 September 2026; 13:15	Hafiz 6	(9–15)	Seifert 9	Sports Hall, The New Capital; Attendance: 150; Referees: Kuttler, Merz (GER)
27 September 2026; 13:15	2× (suspension)	Report	1× (yellow card) 1× (suspension)	Sports Hall, The New Capital; Attendance: 150; Referees: Kuttler, Merz (GER)

27 September 2026; 15:30	FC Barcelona (Spain)	39–29	(Egypt) Zamalek SC	Sports Hall, The New Capital; Attendance: 1,000; Referees: Konjičanin, Konjičanin (BIH)
27 September 2026; 15:30	Barrufet, Fabregas 7	(20–12)	Ahmed 8	Sports Hall, The New Capital; Attendance: 1,000; Referees: Konjičanin, Konjičanin (BIH)
27 September 2026; 15:30	2× (suspension)	Report	2× (suspension) 1× (red card)	Sports Hall, The New Capital; Attendance: 1,000; Referees: Konjičanin, Konjičanin (BIH)

29 September 2026; 13:15	Zamalek SC (Egypt)	28–27	(Brazil) EC Pinheiros	Sports Hall, The New Capital; Attendance: 200; Referees: García, Marín (ESP)
29 September 2026; 13:15	Yosri 8	(16–14)	Duarte 6	Sports Hall, The New Capital; Attendance: 200; Referees: García, Marín (ESP)
29 September 2026; 13:15	1× (yellow card) 1× (suspension)	Report	1× (yellow card) 1× (suspension)	Sports Hall, The New Capital; Attendance: 200; Referees: García, Marín (ESP)

29 September 2026; 15:30	FC Barcelona (Spain)	51–15	(Morocco) Mountada Derb Sultan	Sports Hall, The New Capital; Attendance: 200; Referees: Gasmi, Gasmi (FRA)
29 September 2026; 15:30	Adrian 11	(23–8)	Bentaleb 3	Sports Hall, The New Capital; Attendance: 200; Referees: Gasmi, Gasmi (FRA)
29 September 2026; 15:30	1× (yellow card)	Report	1× (yellow card) 1× (suspension)	Sports Hall, The New Capital; Attendance: 200; Referees: Gasmi, Gasmi (FRA)

=== Group B ===
Pos	Team	Pld	W	D	L	GF	GA	GD	Pts	Qualification
1	(Hungary) Veszprém	3	3	0	0	109	75	+34	6	Final
2	(Egypt) Al Ahly	3	2	0	1	88	75	+13	4	Third place game
3	(Germany) Füchse Berlin	3	1	0	2	98	82	+16	2	Fifth place game
4	(Kuwait) Burgan SC	3	0	0	3	54	117	−63	0	Seventh place game

Source: IHF
Rules for classification: 1) points; 2) head-to-head points; 3) head-to-head goal difference; 4) head-to-head number of goals scored; 5) goal difference.

25 September 2026; 18:30	Al Ahly (Egypt)	23–31	(Hungary) Veszprém	Sports Hall, The New Capital; Attendance: 2,500; Referees: García, Marín (ESP)
25 September 2026; 18:30	Khaled, Ramadan 5	(10–17)	Descat 7	Sports Hall, The New Capital; Attendance: 2,500; Referees: García, Marín (ESP)
25 September 2026; 18:30	2× (suspension)	Report	1× (yellow card) 1× (suspension)	Sports Hall, The New Capital; Attendance: 2,500; Referees: García, Marín (ESP)

25 September 2026; 20:45	Burgan SC (Kuwait)	18–38	(Germany) Füchse Berlin	Sports Hall, The New Capital; Attendance: 280; Referees: Gasmi, Gasmi (FRA)
25 September 2026; 20:45	Hernández Zulueta 5	(11–20)	Zaepfel 10	Sports Hall, The New Capital; Attendance: 280; Referees: Gasmi, Gasmi (FRA)
25 September 2026; 20:45	1× (suspension)	Report	3× (suspension)	Sports Hall, The New Capital; Attendance: 280; Referees: Gasmi, Gasmi (FRA)

27 September 2026; 17:45	Füchse Berlin (Germany)	33–34	(Hungary) Veszprém	Sports Hall, The New Capital; Attendance: 850; Referees: Hansen, Madsen (DEN)
27 September 2026; 17:45	Gidsel, Grøndahl 9	(19–16)	Hesham 8	Sports Hall, The New Capital; Attendance: 850; Referees: Hansen, Madsen (DEN)
27 September 2026; 17:45	2× (yellow card) 7× (suspension)	Report	1× (yellow card) 6× (suspension) 1× (red card)	Sports Hall, The New Capital; Attendance: 850; Referees: Hansen, Madsen (DEN)

27 September 2026; 20:00	Al Ahly (Egypt)	35–17	(Kuwait) Burgan SC	Sports Hall, The New Capital; Attendance: 800; Referees: Lemes, Sosa (URU)
27 September 2026; 20:00	Castilo 8	(15–7)	Hernández Zulueta 5	Sports Hall, The New Capital; Attendance: 800; Referees: Lemes, Sosa (URU)
27 September 2026; 20:00	3× (suspension)	Report	3× (suspension)	Sports Hall, The New Capital; Attendance: 800; Referees: Lemes, Sosa (URU)

29 September 2026; 17:45	Veszprém (Hungary)	44–19	(Kuwait) Burgan SC	Sports Hall, The New Capital; Attendance: 150; Referees: Pavićević, Ražnatović (MNE)
29 September 2026; 17:45	Gáncs-Pető 7	(26–9)	Al-Mizal, Ben Araar 5	Sports Hall, The New Capital; Attendance: 150; Referees: Pavićević, Ražnatović (MNE)
29 September 2026; 17:45	1× (yellow card) 2× (suspension)	Report	1× (suspension)	Sports Hall, The New Capital; Attendance: 150; Referees: Pavićević, Ražnatović (MNE)

29 September 2026; 20:00	Füchse Berlin (Germany)	27–30	(Egypt) Al Ahly	Sports Hall, The New Capital; Attendance: 940; Referees: Konjičanin, Konjičanin (BIH)
29 September 2026; 20:00	Langhoff 8	(14–16)	Hany, Hesham 6	Sports Hall, The New Capital; Attendance: 940; Referees: Konjičanin, Konjičanin (BIH)
29 September 2026; 20:00	1× (yellow card) 1× (suspension)	Report	1× (yellow card) 3× (suspension)	Sports Hall, The New Capital; Attendance: 940; Referees: Konjičanin, Konjičanin (BIH)

== Placement games ==
=== Ninth place game ===
Team 1	Agg.	Team 2	1st leg	2nd leg
Los Angeles THC (United States)	51–44	(Australia) Sydney University HC	28–17	23–27

25 September 2026; 11:00	Los Angeles THC (United States)	28–17	(Australia) Sydney University HC	Sports Hall, The New Capital; Attendance: 110; Referees: Kuttler, Merz (GER)
25 September 2026; 11:00	Velkavrh 10	(12–7)	Naser 5	Sports Hall, The New Capital; Attendance: 110; Referees: Kuttler, Merz (GER)
25 September 2026; 11:00	1× (yellow card) 2× (suspension)	Report	3× (suspension)	Sports Hall, The New Capital; Attendance: 110; Referees: Kuttler, Merz (GER)

27 September 2026; 11:00	Sydney University HC (Australia)	27–23	(United States) Los Angeles THC	Sports Hall, The New Capital; Attendance: 100; Referees: El-Beltagy, Emam (EGY)
27 September 2026; 11:00	Wangler 9	(13–12)	Velkavrh 7	Sports Hall, The New Capital; Attendance: 100; Referees: El-Beltagy, Emam (EGY)
27 September 2026; 11:00	4× (suspension)	Report	2× (suspension)	Sports Hall, The New Capital; Attendance: 100; Referees: El-Beltagy, Emam (EGY)

Los Angeles THC won 51–44 on aggreagte.

=== Seventh place game ===
1 October 2026; 13:30	Mountada Derb Sultan (Morocco)	25–29	(Kuwait) Burgan SC	Sports Hall, The New Capital; Attendance: 110; Referees: El-Beltagy, Emam (EGY)
1 October 2026; 13:30	Hafiz 8	(15–12)	Al-Khaldi 6	Sports Hall, The New Capital; Attendance: 110; Referees: El-Beltagy, Emam (EGY)
1 October 2026; 13:30	1× (suspension)	Report	1× (suspension)	Sports Hall, The New Capital; Attendance: 110; Referees: El-Beltagy, Emam (EGY)

=== Fifth place game ===
1 October 2026; 16:00	EC Pinheiros (Brazil)	27–31	(Germany) Füchse Berlin	Sports Hall, The New Capital; Attendance: 185; Referees: Lemes, Sosa (URU)
1 October 2026; 16:00	Oliveira 5	(13–17)	Grøndahl 7	Sports Hall, The New Capital; Attendance: 185; Referees: Lemes, Sosa (URU)
1 October 2026; 16:00	3× (suspension)	Report	3× (suspension)	Sports Hall, The New Capital; Attendance: 185; Referees: Lemes, Sosa (URU)

=== Third place game ===
1 October 2026; 18:30	Zamalek SC (Egypt)	25–30	(Egypt) Al Ahly	Sports Hall, The New Capital; Attendance: 6,100; Referees: Hansen, Madsen (DEN)
1 October 2026; 18:30	five players 4	(13–19)	Khaled 6	Sports Hall, The New Capital; Attendance: 6,100; Referees: Hansen, Madsen (DEN)
1 October 2026; 18:30	6× (suspension)	Report	11× (suspension) 1× (red card)	Sports Hall, The New Capital; Attendance: 6,100; Referees: Hansen, Madsen (DEN)

=== Final ===
1 October 2026; 21:00	FC Barcelona (Spain)	33–42	(Hungary) Veszprém	Sports Hall, The New Capital; Attendance: 3,000; Referees: Pavićević, Ražnatović (MNE)
1 October 2026; 21:00	N’Guessan 9	(16–22)	Descat 10	Sports Hall, The New Capital; Attendance: 3,000; Referees: Pavićević, Ražnatović (MNE)
1 October 2026; 21:00	2× (suspension)	Report	1× (yellow card) 6× (suspension)	Sports Hall, The New Capital; Attendance: 3,000; Referees: Pavićević, Ražnatović (MNE)

== Final ranking ==
Rank	Team
1st place, gold medalist(s)	(Hungary) Veszprém
2nd place, silver medalist(s)	(Spain) FC Barcelona
3rd place, bronze medalist(s)	(Egypt) Al Ahly
4	(Egypt) Zamalek SC
5	(Germany) Füchse Berlin
6	(Brazil) EC Pinheiros
7	(Kuwait) Burgan SC
8	(Morocco) Mountada Derb Sultan
9	(United States) Los Angeles THC
10	(Australia) Sydney University HC

== All-Star Team ==
The All-Star Team was announced on 1 October 2026.

Position	Player	Club
Goalkeeper	(Spain) Sergey Hernández	FC Barcelona
Right wing	(France) Yanis Lenne	Veszprém
Right back	(Egypt) Youssef Ahmed	Zamalek SC
Centre back	(Egypt) Mohamed Hesham	Al Ahly
Left back	(Egypt) Ahmed Hesham	Veszprém
Left wing	(Spain) Ian Barrufet	FC Barcelona
Pivot	(France) Ludovic Fabregas	FC Barcelona
MVP	(Denmark) Emil Nielsen	Veszprém
