= 2021 World Men's Handball Championship =

27th event hosted by the International Handball Federation

بطولة العالم لكرة اليد للرجال 2021

Tournament details
- Host country: Egypt
- Venues: 4 (in 4 host cities)
- Dates: 13–31 January
- Teams: 32 (from 4 confederations)

Final positions
- Champions: Denmark (2nd title)
- Runners-up: Sweden
- Third place: Spain
- Fourth place: France

Tournament statistics
- Matches played: 102
- Goals scored: 5,803 (56.89 per match)
- Top scorers: (Qatar) Frankis Marzo (58 goals)

Awards
- Best player: (Denmark) Mikkel Hansen

The 2021 IHF World Men's Handball Championship was the 27th event hosted by the International Handball Federation and held in Egypt from 13 to 31 January 2021.

Starting with this edition, the World Championship was expanded from 24 teams to 32. It was also the third World Championship hosted in Africa, the second in Egypt, and the first to be hosted outside of Europe since 2015.

Denmark were the defending champions, having won their first World Championship title in 2019 on home soil. They defended the title by beating Sweden in the final, the second final between two Scandinavian countries in a row. On the way, Denmark defeated hosts Egypt in the quarter-finals, and the reigning European champions Spain in the semi-finals. The latter secured the bronze medal after defeating France in the third place game.

The tournament was played behind closed doors due to the COVID-19 pandemic.

== Bidding process ==
Seven nations initially expressed interest in hosting the tournament:

- Egypt
- France
- Hungary
- Poland
- Slovakia
- Sweden
- Switzerland

However, until the bidding phase expired on 15 April 2015, only three nations entered documents to bid for the event:

- Egypt
- Hungary
- Poland

A decision was scheduled for 4 June 2015, but the Congress was moved to 6 November 2015, where Egypt was chosen as the host.

== Format ==
The 2021 edition saw a format change as the tournament was expanded. The 32 teams were split into eight groups of four teams each. The top three teams from each group progressed to the main round, while the teams ranked last in their preliminary round groups played the President's Cup. The 24 main round teams were divided into four groups of six teams each. The top two teams from each group advanced to the quarter-finals.

== Venues ==
Following is a list of all venues and host cities.

2021 World Men's Handball Championship is located in Egypt	Cairo	New Administrative Capital
2021 World Men's Handball Championship is located in Egypt	Cairo Stadium Indoor Halls Complex	New Capital Sports Hall
2021 World Men's Handball Championship is located in Egypt	Capacity: 17,000	Capacity: 7,500
2021 World Men's Handball Championship is located in Egypt	Alexandria	6th of October City
2021 World Men's Handball Championship is located in Egypt	Borg El Arab Sports Hall	Dr. Hassan Moustafa Sports Hall
2021 World Men's Handball Championship is located in Egypt	Capacity: 5,000	Capacity: 4,500

== Qualification ==
As is the previous editions, the World Championship host country and the current World directly qualified.After the decision about increasing the number of participating teams, changes were made in the proportional distribution of places by the Continental Confederations. The number of compulsory places awarded to each Continental Confederation was increased as follows: four places each for Africa, Asia, and Europe.Another change was relative to the Americas places.In 2019, the Pan-American zone was split into two zones: One was the North American and Caribbean Zone with one compulsory place, and the South and Central America Zone with three places. There was also a South and Central American Men's Last Chance Qualification Tournament which provided a qualification spot for the winning team. One additional place was available for Oceania, but only in the case where that national team would rank fifth or higher at the Asian Championship. Since no Oceania team placed among the top five at the Asian Championship, the IHF awarded an extra wild card. In addition, there were 12 ranking places for the Continental Confederations, which were based on the teams ranked 1–12 of the preceding World Championship and World Ranking and who were unable to qualify directly. and taking into consideration the results of the 2019 Men's World Championship, 32 places were distributed as follows:

- Host nation: 1
- Reigning world champion: 1
- Africa: 6
- Asia: 4
- Europe: 13
- Pan America: 5
  - North America and Caribbean: 1
  - South and Central America: 3
  - South and Central American Last Chance Qualification Tournament: 1
- Oceania/additional wild card: 1
- Wild card: 1

Competition	Dates	Host	Vacancies	Qualified
Host nation	6 November 2015	(Russia) Sochi	1	Egypt
2019 World Championship	10–27 January 2019	Denmark; Germany	1	Denmark
2020 European Championship	9–26 January 2020	Austria; Norway; Sweden	3	Croatia; Norway; Spain
2020 African Championship	16–26 January 2020	Tunisia	6	Algeria; Angola; Cape Verde; DR Congo; Morocco; Tunisia
2020 Asian Championship	16–27 January 2020	Kuwait City	4^{[1]}	Bahrain; Japan; Qatar; South Korea
2020 South and Central American Championship	21–25 January 2020	(Brazil) Maringá	3	Argentina; Brazil; Uruguay
~~2020 Nor.Ca. Championship~~	(Cancelled)^{[2]}	Mexico City	1-1	~~United States~~
2020 South and Central American; Last Chance Qualification Tournament	(Cancelled)^{[2]}	Uruguay	1	Chile
European qualification	23 October 2019 – 5 July 2020 (cancelled)	Various (cancelled)	10+1^{[3]}	Austria; Belarus; ~~Czech Republic~~; France; Germany; Hungary; Iceland; Portugal; Slovenia; Sweden; North Macedonia (replacement); Switzerland (replacement)
Wild card	9 July 2020	—	2^{[1]}	Poland; RHF^{[4]}

1. Since countries from Oceania (Australia or New Zealand) participating in the Asian Championships did not finish within the top five, they did not qualify for the World Championship. Since they placed sixth or lower, the place transferred to the wild card spot.
2. Due to the COVID-19 pandemic, the South and North American qualification tournaments were scrapped. The IHF Council decided to extend the deadline for the organisation of the remaining qualification tournaments until 31 October 2020.
3. Because the European qualification was cancelled, the final ranking of the 2020 European Men's Handball Championship was used to determine the participants.
4. On 9 December 2019, the World Anti-Doping Agency (WADA) banned Russia from all international sport for a period of four years, after the Russian government was found to have tampered with laboratory data that it provided to WADA in January 2019 as a condition of the Russian Anti-Doping Agency being reinstated. As a result of the ban, WADA plans to allow individually cleared Russian athletes to take part in the 2020 Summer Olympics under a neutral banner, as instigated at the 2018 Winter Olympics, but they will not be permitted to compete in team sports. The title of the neutral banner has yet to be determined; WADA Compliance Review Committee head Jonathan Taylor stated that the IOC would not be able to use "Olympic Athletes from Russia" (OAR) as it did in 2018, emphasizing that neutral athletes cannot be portrayed as representing a specific country. Russia later filed an appeal to the Court of Arbitration for Sport (CAS) against the WADA decision. After reviewing the case on appeal, CAS ruled on 17 December 2020 to reduce the penalty that WADA had placed on Russia. Instead of banning Russia from sporting events, the ruling allowed Russia to participate at the Olympics and other international events, but for a period of two years, the team cannot use the Russian name, flag, or anthem and must present themselves as "Neutral Athlete" or "Neutral Team". The ruling does allow for team uniforms to display "Russia" on the uniform as well as the use of the Russian flag colors within the uniform's design, although the name should be up to equal predominance as the "Neutral Athlete/Team" designation. The Russian team will play under the name "Russian Handball Federation Team".

=== Qualified teams ===
Country	Qualified as	Qualified on	Previous appearances^{1, 2}
Egypt	Host	6 November 2015	15 (1964, 1993, 1995, 1997,1999, 2001, 2003, 2005, 2007, 2009, 2011, 2013, 2015, 2017, 2019)
Denmark	World champion	27 January 2019	23 (1938, 1954, 1958, 1961, 1964, 1967, 1970, 1974, 1978, 1982, 1986, 1993, 1995, 1999, 2003, 2005, 2007, 2009, 2011, 2013, 2015, 2017, **2019**)
Angola	Top seven at 2020 African Championship	20 January 2020	4 (2005, 2007, 2017, 2019)
Algeria	Top seven at 2020 African Championship	20 January 2020	14 (1974, 1982, 1986, 1990, 1995, 1997, 1999, 2001, 2003, 2005, 2009, 2011, 2013, 2015)
Tunisia	Top seven at 2020 African Championship	20 January 2020	14 (1967, 1995, 1997, 1999, 2001, 2003, 2005, 2007, 2009, 2011, 2013, 2015, 2017, 2019)
Qatar	Semifinalist at 2020 Asian Championship	21 January 2020	7 (2003, 2005, 2007, 2013, 2015, 2017, 2019)
Japan	Semifinalist at 2020 Asian Championship	23 January 2020	14 (1961, 1964, 1967, 1970, 1974, 1978, 1982, 1990, 1995, 1997, 2005, 2011, 2017, 2019)
Bahrain	Semifinalist at 2020 Asian Championship	23 January 2020	3 (2011, 2017, 2019)
South Korea	Semifinalist at 2020 Asian Championship	23 January 2020	12 (1986, 1990, 1993, 1995, 1997, 1999, 2001, 2007, 2009, 2011, 2013, 2019^{3})
Argentina	Top three at 2020 South and Central American Championship	23 January 2020	12 (1997, 1999, 2001, 2003, 2005, 2007, 2009, 2011, 2013, 2015, 2017, 2019)
Brazil	Top three at 2020 South and Central American Championship	23 January 2020	14 (1958, 1995, 1997, 1999, 2001, 2003, 2005, 2007, 2009, 2011, 2013, 2015, 2017, 2019)
Croatia	Top three at 2020 European Championship	24 January 2020	13 (1995, 1997, 1999, 2001, **2003**, 2005, 2007, 2009, 2011, 2013, 2015, 2017, 2019)
Spain	Top three at 2020 European Championship	24 January 2020	20 (1958, 1974, 1978, 1982, 1986, 1990, 1993, 1995, 1997, 1999, 2001, 2003, **2005**, 2007, 2009, 2011, **2013**, 2015, 2017, 2019)
Cape Verde	Top seven at 2020 African Championship	24 January 2020	0 (debut)
Morocco	Top seven at 2020 African Championship	24 January 2020	6 (1995, 1997, 1999, 2001, 2003, 2007)
Norway	Top three at 2020 European Championship	25 January 2020	15 (1958, 1961, 1964, 1967, 1970, 1993, 1997, 1999, 2001, 2005, 2007, 2009, 2011, 2017, 2019)
Uruguay	Top three at 2020 South and Central American Championship	25 January 2020	0 (debut)
DR Congo	Top seven at 2020 African Championship	26 January 2020	0 (debut)
Austria	2020 European Championship final ranking	24 April 2020	6 (1938, 1958, 1993, 2011, 2015, 2019)
Belarus	2020 European Championship final ranking	24 April 2020	4 (1995, 2013, 2015, 2017)
~~Czech Republic~~^{4}	2020 European Championship final ranking	24 April 2020	6 (1995, 1997, 2001, 2005, 2007, 2015)
France	2020 European Championship final ranking	24 April 2020	22 (1954, 1958, 1961, 1964, 1967, 1970, 1978, 1990, 1993, **1995**, 1997, 1999, **2001**, 2003, 2005, 2007, **2009**, **2011**, 2013, **2015**, **2017**, 2019)
Germany	2020 European Championship final ranking	24 April 2020	25 (**1938**, 1954, 1958, 1961, 1964, 1967, 1970, 1974, **1978**, 1982, 1986, 1990^{7}, 1993, 1995, 1999, 2001, 2003, 2005, **2007**, 2009, 2011, 2013, 2015, 2017, 2019)
Hungary	2020 European Championship final ranking	24 April 2020	20 (1958, 1964, 1967, 1970, 1974, 1978, 1982, 1986, 1990, 1993, 1995, 1997, 1999, 2003, 2007, 2009, 2011, 2013, 2017, 2019)
Iceland	2020 European Championship final ranking	24 April 2020	20 (1958, 1961, 1964, 1970, 1974, 1978, 1986, 1990, 1993, 1995, 1997, 2001, 2003, 2005, 2007, 2011, 2013, 2015, 2017, 2019)
Portugal	2020 European Championship final ranking	24 April 2020	3 (1997, 2001, 2003)
Slovenia	2020 European Championship final ranking	24 April 2020	8 (1995, 2001, 2003, 2005, 2007, 2013, 2015, 2017)
Sweden	2020 European Championship final ranking	24 April 2020	24 (1938, **1954**, **1958**, 1961, 1964, 1967, 1970, 1974, 1978, 1982, 1986, **1990**, 1993, 1995, 1997, **1999**, 2001, 2003, 2005, 2009, 2011, 2015, 2017, 2019)
Poland	Wildcard	9 July 2020	15 (1958, 1967, 1970, 1974, 1978, 1982, 1986, 1990, 2003, 2007, 2009, 2011, 2013, 2015, 2017)
ROC	Wildcard	9 July 2020	13 (**1993**, 1995, **1997**, 1999, 2001, 2003, 2005, 2007, 2009, 2013, 2015, 2017, 2019)^{5}
~~United States~~^{6}	North America and Caribbean representative	2 November 2020	6 (1964, 1970, 1974, 1993, 1995, 2001)
Chile	South and Central America representative	10 November 2020	5 (2011, 2013, 2015, 2017, 2019)
North Macedonia^{4}	Replacement	12 January 2021	6 (1999, 2009, 2013, 2015, 2017, 2019)
Switzerland^{6}	Replacement	12 January 2021	10 (1954, 1961, 1964, 1967, 1970, 1982, 1986, 1990, 1993, 1995)

^{1} Bold indicates champion for that year.
^{2} Italic indicates host country for that year.
^{3} Participated as a Unified Korea team in 2019.
^{4} On 12 January, the International Handball Federation announced that the Czech Republic had withdrawn from the tournament due to high number of COVID-19 infected players. North Macedonia replaced them.
^{5} Participated as Russia in 1993–2019.
^{6} On 12 January, the International Handball Federation announced that the United States had withdrawn from the tournament due to high number of COVID-19 infected players. Switzerland replaced them.
^{7} From both German teams only East Germany was qualified in 1990

== Draw ==
The draw was held on 5 September 2020 at the Giza Pyramids Plateau. As hosts, Egypt had the privilege to assign itself to a group.

=== Seeding ===
On 23 July 2020, the pots were announced.

Pot 1	Pot 2	Pot 3	Pot 4
Denmark; Spain; Croatia; Norway; Slovenia; Germany; Portugal; Sweden	Egypt; Argentina; Austria; Hungary; Tunisia; Algeria; Qatar; Belarus	Iceland; Brazil; Uruguay; ~~Czech Republic~~; France; South Korea; Japan; Bahrain; North Macedonia^{4}	Angola; Cape Verde; Morocco; Chile; DR Congo; Poland; ~~United States~~ * ROC; Switzerland^{5}

=== Groups ===
This is the result of the draw with all groups

Group 1	Group 2	Group 3	Group 4	Group 5	Group 6	Group 7	Group 8
Germany; Hungary; Uruguay; Cape Verde	Spain; Tunisia; Brazil; Poland	Croatia; Qatar; Japan; Angola	Denmark; Argentina; Bahrain; DR Congo	Norway; Austria; France; Switzerland	Portugal; Algeria; Iceland; Morocco	Sweden; Egypt; North Macedonia; Chile	Slovenia; Belarus; South Korea; ROC; United States

== Referees ==
The referee pairs were selected on 4 January 2021.

Referees
Algeria	Youcef Belkhiri; Sid Ali Hamidi
Argentina	Julian Grillo; Sebastián Lenci
Croatia	Matija Gubica; Boris Milošević
Czech Republic	Václav Horáček; Jiří Novotný
Denmark	Mads Hansen; Jesper Madsen
Egypt	Alaa Emam; Hossam Hedaia
France	Charlotte Bonaventura; Julie Bonaventura
France	Karim Gasmi; Raouf Gasmi
Germany	Robert Schulze; Tobias Tönnies
Iran	Majid Kolahdouzan; Alireza Mousaviannazhad

Referees
North Macedonia	Gjorgji Nachevski; Slave Nikolov
Montenegro	Ivan Pavićević; Miloš Ražnatović
Norway	Håvard Kleven; Lars Jørum
Portugal	Duarte Santos; Ricardo Fonseca
Slovenia	Bojan Lah; David Sok
Spain	Óscar Raluy; Ángel Sabroso
Sweden	Mirza Kurtagic; Mattias Wetterwik
Switzerland	Arthur Brunner; Morad Salah
Tunisia	Samir Krichen; Samir Makhlouf

== Preliminary round ==
All times are local (UTC+2).

=== Group A ===
Pos	Team	Pld	W	D	L	GF	GA	GD	Pts	Qualification
1	Hungary	3	3	0	0	107	73	+34	6	Main round
2	Germany	3	2	0	1	81	43	+38	4	Main round
3	Uruguay	3	1	0	2	42	87	−45	2	Main round
4	Cape Verde	3	0	0	3	27	54	−27	0	Presidents Cup

Source: IHF
Rules for classification: 1) points; 2) head-to-head points; 3) head-to-head goal difference; 4) head-to-head number of goals scored; 5) goal difference.

15 January 2021; 19:00	Germany	43–14	Uruguay	Dr. Hassan Moustafa Sports Hall, 6th of October City; Referees: Grillo, Lenci (ARG)
15 January 2021; 19:00	Kastening 9	(16–4)	Morandeira 4	Dr. Hassan Moustafa Sports Hall, 6th of October City; Referees: Grillo, Lenci (ARG)
15 January 2021; 19:00	4× (suspension)	Report	1× (yellow card) 2× (suspension)	Dr. Hassan Moustafa Sports Hall, 6th of October City; Referees: Grillo, Lenci (ARG)

15 January 2021; 21:30	Hungary	34–27	Cape Verde	Dr. Hassan Moustafa Sports Hall, 6th of October City; Referees: Emam, Hedaia (EGY)
15 January 2021; 21:30	Ancsin 7	(19–14)	Semedo 6	Dr. Hassan Moustafa Sports Hall, 6th of October City; Referees: Emam, Hedaia (EGY)
15 January 2021; 21:30	1× (yellow card) 6× (suspension) 1× (red card)	Report	1× (yellow card) 4× (suspension)	Dr. Hassan Moustafa Sports Hall, 6th of October City; Referees: Emam, Hedaia (EGY)

17 January 2021	Cape Verde	0–10 (Note: Cape Verde had to withdraw from the tournament, after not having the minimum of players available, due to several cases of players who tested positive for COVID-19.)	Germany

17 January 2021; 21:30	Hungary	44–18	Uruguay	Dr. Hassan Moustafa Sports Hall, 6th of October City; Referees: Kolahdouzan, Mousaviannazhad (IRI)
17 January 2021; 21:30	Máthé 8	(16–8)	Morandeira 4	Dr. Hassan Moustafa Sports Hall, 6th of October City; Referees: Kolahdouzan, Mousaviannazhad (IRI)
17 January 2021; 21:30	2× (yellow card) 3× (suspension)	Report	2× (suspension)	Dr. Hassan Moustafa Sports Hall, 6th of October City; Referees: Kolahdouzan, Mousaviannazhad (IRI)

19 January 2021	Uruguay	10–0	Cape Verde

19 January 2021; 21:30	Germany	28–29	Hungary	Dr. Hassan Moustafa Sports Hall, 6th of October City; Referees: Gubica, Milošević (CRO)
19 January 2021; 21:30	Schiller 7	(14–15)	Bánhidi, Máthé 8	Dr. Hassan Moustafa Sports Hall, 6th of October City; Referees: Gubica, Milošević (CRO)
19 January 2021; 21:30	7× (suspension)	Report	1× (yellow card) 7× (suspension)	Dr. Hassan Moustafa Sports Hall, 6th of October City; Referees: Gubica, Milošević (CRO)

=== Group B ===
Pos	Team	Pld	W	D	L	GF	GA	GD	Pts	Qualification
1	Spain	3	2	1	0	92	85	+7	5	Main round
2	Poland	3	2	0	1	89	78	+11	4	Main round
3	Brazil	3	0	2	1	84	94	−10	2	Main round
4	Tunisia	3	0	1	2	90	98	−8	1	Presidents Cup

Source: IHF
Rules for classification: 1) points; 2) head-to-head points; 3) head-to-head goal difference; 4) head-to-head number of goals scored; 5) goal difference.

15 January 2021; 19:00	Spain	29–29	Brazil	New Capital Sports Hall, New Administrative Capital; Referees: Pavićević, Ražnatović (MNE)
15 January 2021; 19:00	three players 4	(16–13)	Langaro, Moraes Ferreira 6	New Capital Sports Hall, New Administrative Capital; Referees: Pavićević, Ražnatović (MNE)
15 January 2021; 19:00	4× (suspension)	Report	1× (yellow card) 6× (suspension)	New Capital Sports Hall, New Administrative Capital; Referees: Pavićević, Ražnatović (MNE)

15 January 2021; 21:30	Tunisia	28–30	Poland	New Capital Sports Hall, New Administrative Capital; Referees: Nachevski, Nikolov (MKD)
15 January 2021; 21:30	Sanaï 9	(17–17)	Moryto 11	New Capital Sports Hall, New Administrative Capital; Referees: Nachevski, Nikolov (MKD)
15 January 2021; 21:30	2× (yellow card) 5× (suspension)	Report	2× (yellow card) 6× (suspension)	New Capital Sports Hall, New Administrative Capital; Referees: Nachevski, Nikolov (MKD)

17 January 2021; 19:00	Tunisia	32–32	Brazil	New Capital Sports Hall, New Administrative Capital; Referees: Hansen, Madsen (DEN)
17 January 2021; 19:00	Darmoul 9	(20–16)	Hackbarth, Langaro 6	New Capital Sports Hall, New Administrative Capital; Referees: Hansen, Madsen (DEN)
17 January 2021; 19:00	2× (yellow card) 6× (suspension)	Report	4× (suspension)	New Capital Sports Hall, New Administrative Capital; Referees: Hansen, Madsen (DEN)

17 January 2021; 21:30	Poland	26–27	Spain	New Capital Sports Hall, New Administrative Capital; Referees: Horáček, Novotný (CZE)
17 January 2021; 21:30	Sićko 6	(11–14)	three players 5	New Capital Sports Hall, New Administrative Capital; Referees: Horáček, Novotný (CZE)
17 January 2021; 21:30	1× (yellow card) 6× (suspension)	Report	1× (yellow card) 2× (suspension)	New Capital Sports Hall, New Administrative Capital; Referees: Horáček, Novotný (CZE)

19 January 2021; 19:00	Spain	36–30	Tunisia	New Capital Sports Hall, New Administrative Capital; Referees: Hansen, Madsen (DEN)
19 January 2021; 19:00	Fernández Pérez 10	(17–14)	Darmoul 8	New Capital Sports Hall, New Administrative Capital; Referees: Hansen, Madsen (DEN)
19 January 2021; 19:00	5× (suspension)	Report	1× (yellow card) 3× (suspension)	New Capital Sports Hall, New Administrative Capital; Referees: Hansen, Madsen (DEN)

19 January 2021; 21:30	Brazil	23–33	Poland	New Capital Sports Hall, New Administrative Capital; Referees: Pavićević, Ražnatović (MNE)
19 January 2021; 21:30	Langaro 4	(11–13)	Moryto, Sićko 6	New Capital Sports Hall, New Administrative Capital; Referees: Pavićević, Ražnatović (MNE)
19 January 2021; 21:30	1× (yellow card) 4× (suspension)	Report	1× (yellow card) 4× (suspension)	New Capital Sports Hall, New Administrative Capital; Referees: Pavićević, Ražnatović (MNE)

=== Group C ===
Pos	Team	Pld	W	D	L	GF	GA	GD	Pts	Qualification
1	Croatia	3	2	1	0	83	73	+10	5	Main round
2	Qatar	3	2	0	1	85	80	+5	4	Main round
3	Japan	3	1	1	1	88	89	−1	3	Main round
4	Angola	3	0	0	3	74	88	−14	0	Presidents Cup

Source: IHF
Rules for classification: 1) points; 2) head-to-head points; 3) head-to-head goal difference; 4) head-to-head number of goals scored; 5) goal difference.

15 January 2021; 16:30	Qatar	30–25	Angola	Borg El Arab Sports Hall, Borg El Arab; Referees: Fonseca, Santos (POR)
15 January 2021; 16:30	Madadi 8	(14–13)	Pestana 6	Borg El Arab Sports Hall, Borg El Arab; Referees: Fonseca, Santos (POR)
15 January 2021; 16:30	1× (yellow card) 6× (suspension)	Report	4× (suspension)	Borg El Arab Sports Hall, Borg El Arab; Referees: Fonseca, Santos (POR)

15 January 2021; 19:00	Croatia	29–29	Japan	Borg El Arab Sports Hall, Borg El Arab; Referees: Krichen, Makhlouf (TUN)
15 January 2021; 19:00	Marić 7	(14–17)	Agarie, R. Tokuda 5	Borg El Arab Sports Hall, Borg El Arab; Referees: Krichen, Makhlouf (TUN)
15 January 2021; 19:00	2× (yellow card) 3× (suspension)	Report	2× (yellow card) 3× (suspension)	Borg El Arab Sports Hall, Borg El Arab; Referees: Krichen, Makhlouf (TUN)

17 January 2021; 16:30	Qatar	31–29	Japan	Borg El Arab Sports Hall, Borg El Arab; Referees: Raluy, Sabroso (ESP)
17 January 2021; 16:30	Frankis 11	(15–16)	Doi 7	Borg El Arab Sports Hall, Borg El Arab; Referees: Raluy, Sabroso (ESP)
17 January 2021; 16:30	3× (suspension)	Report	2× (yellow card) 3× (suspension)	Borg El Arab Sports Hall, Borg El Arab; Referees: Raluy, Sabroso (ESP)

17 January 2021; 19:00	Angola	20–28	Croatia	Borg El Arab Sports Hall, Borg El Arab; Referees: Belkhiri, Hamidi (ALG)
17 January 2021; 19:00	Ferreira 4	(11–12)	Čupić 6	Borg El Arab Sports Hall, Borg El Arab; Referees: Belkhiri, Hamidi (ALG)
17 January 2021; 19:00	6× (suspension) 2× (red card)	Report	3× (yellow card) 6× (suspension)	Borg El Arab Sports Hall, Borg El Arab; Referees: Belkhiri, Hamidi (ALG)

19 January 2021; 16:30	Japan	30–29	Angola	Borg El Arab Sports Hall, Borg El Arab; Referees: Krichen, Makhlouf (TUN)
19 January 2021; 16:30	Watanabe 7	(16–12)	Tati 6	Borg El Arab Sports Hall, Borg El Arab; Referees: Krichen, Makhlouf (TUN)
19 January 2021; 16:30	1× (suspension)	Report	5× (suspension)	Borg El Arab Sports Hall, Borg El Arab; Referees: Krichen, Makhlouf (TUN)

19 January 2021; 19:00	Croatia	26–24	Qatar	Borg El Arab Sports Hall, Borg El Arab; Referees: Nachevski, Nikolov (MKD)
19 January 2021; 19:00	Štrlek 6	(13–11)	Frankis 7	Borg El Arab Sports Hall, Borg El Arab; Referees: Nachevski, Nikolov (MKD)
19 January 2021; 19:00	2× (yellow card) 4× (suspension)	Report	1× (yellow card) 2× (suspension)	Borg El Arab Sports Hall, Borg El Arab; Referees: Nachevski, Nikolov (MKD)

=== Group D ===
Pos	Team	Pld	W	D	L	GF	GA	GD	Pts	Qualification
1	Denmark	3	3	0	0	104	59	+45	6	Main round
2	Argentina	3	2	0	1	72	74	−2	4	Main round
3	Bahrain	3	1	0	2	75	85	−10	2	Main round
4	DR Congo	3	0	0	3	68	101	−33	0	Presidents Cup

Source: IHF
Rules for classification: 1) points; 2) head-to-head points; 3) head-to-head goal difference; 4) head-to-head number of goals scored; 5) goal difference.

15 January 2021; 19:00	Argentina	28–22	DR Congo	Cairo Stadium Indoor Halls Complex, Cairo; Referees: C. Bonaventura, J. Bonaventura (FRA)
15 January 2021; 19:00	three players 5	(13–14)	Kiangebeni 7	Cairo Stadium Indoor Halls Complex, Cairo; Referees: C. Bonaventura, J. Bonaventura (FRA)
15 January 2021; 19:00	1× (yellow card) 4× (suspension)	Report	2× (suspension)	Cairo Stadium Indoor Halls Complex, Cairo; Referees: C. Bonaventura, J. Bonaventura (FRA)

15 January 2021; 21:30	Denmark	34–20	Bahrain	Cairo Stadium Indoor Halls Complex, Cairo; Referees: Brunner, Salah (SUI)
15 January 2021; 21:30	Gidsel 10	(19–10)	Ahmed 8	Cairo Stadium Indoor Halls Complex, Cairo; Referees: Brunner, Salah (SUI)
15 January 2021; 21:30	5× (suspension)	Report	1× (yellow card) 4× (suspension)	Cairo Stadium Indoor Halls Complex, Cairo; Referees: Brunner, Salah (SUI)

17 January 2021; 19:00	Argentina	24–21	Bahrain	Cairo Stadium Indoor Halls Complex, Cairo; Referees: Schulze, Tönnies (GER)
17 January 2021; 19:00	Pizarro 6	(12–10)	Ahmed 5	Cairo Stadium Indoor Halls Complex, Cairo; Referees: Schulze, Tönnies (GER)
17 January 2021; 19:00	1× (yellow card) 1× (suspension)	Report	3× (yellow card) 6× (suspension)	Cairo Stadium Indoor Halls Complex, Cairo; Referees: Schulze, Tönnies (GER)

17 January 2021; 21:30	DR Congo	19–39	Denmark	Cairo Stadium Indoor Halls Complex, Cairo; Referees: Brunner, Salah (SUI)
17 January 2021; 21:30	Bouity, Mvumbi 4	(10–23)	J. Hansen 8	Cairo Stadium Indoor Halls Complex, Cairo; Referees: Brunner, Salah (SUI)
17 January 2021; 21:30	1× (yellow card) 3× (suspension)	Report	1× (yellow card) 1× (suspension)	Cairo Stadium Indoor Halls Complex, Cairo; Referees: Brunner, Salah (SUI)

19 January 2021; 19:00	Bahrain	34–27	DR Congo	Cairo Stadium Indoor Halls Complex, Cairo; Referees: Jørum, Kleven (NOR)
19 January 2021; 19:00	Al-Sayyad 9	(14–12)	Kiangebeni 6	Cairo Stadium Indoor Halls Complex, Cairo; Referees: Jørum, Kleven (NOR)
19 January 2021; 19:00	1× (yellow card) 7× (suspension)	Report	1× (yellow card) 4× (suspension)	Cairo Stadium Indoor Halls Complex, Cairo; Referees: Jørum, Kleven (NOR)

19 January 2021; 21:30	Denmark	31–20	Argentina	Cairo Stadium Indoor Halls Complex, Cairo; Referees: C. Bonaventura, J. Bonaventura (FRA)
19 January 2021; 21:30	M. Hansen 7	(15–10)	Martínez Cami 6	Cairo Stadium Indoor Halls Complex, Cairo; Referees: C. Bonaventura, J. Bonaventura (FRA)
19 January 2021; 21:30	1× (yellow card) 3× (suspension)	Report	3× (yellow card) 6× (suspension) 1× (red card)	Cairo Stadium Indoor Halls Complex, Cairo; Referees: C. Bonaventura, J. Bonaventura (FRA)

=== Group E ===
Pos	Team	Pld	W	D	L	GF	GA	GD	Pts	Qualification
1	France	3	3	0	0	88	76	+12	6	Main round
2	Norway	3	2	0	1	93	82	+11	4	Main round
3	Switzerland (Note: Switzerland replaced the United States, who withdrew due to a COVID-19 outbreak in the squad.)	3	1	0	2	77	81	−4	2	Main round
4	Austria	3	0	0	3	82	101	−19	0	Presidents Cup

Source: IHF
Rules for classification: 1) points; 2) head-to-head points; 3) head-to-head goal difference; 4) head-to-head number of goals scored; 5) goal difference.
Notes:

14 January 2021; 19:00	Austria	25–28	Switzerland	Dr. Hassan Moustafa Sports Hall, 6th of October City; Referees: Kolahdouzan, Mousaviannazhad (IRI)
14 January 2021; 19:00	Weber 7	(13–13)	Schmid 7	Dr. Hassan Moustafa Sports Hall, 6th of October City; Referees: Kolahdouzan, Mousaviannazhad (IRI)
14 January 2021; 19:00	1× (yellow card) 7× (suspension) 1× (red card)	Report	1× (yellow card) 4× (suspension)	Dr. Hassan Moustafa Sports Hall, 6th of October City; Referees: Kolahdouzan, Mousaviannazhad (IRI)

14 January 2021; 21:30	Norway	24–28	France	Dr. Hassan Moustafa Sports Hall, 6th of October City; Referees: García, Marín (ESP)
14 January 2021; 21:30	Sagosen 10	(13–13)	Mahé 9	Dr. Hassan Moustafa Sports Hall, 6th of October City; Referees: García, Marín (ESP)
14 January 2021; 21:30	5× (suspension)	Report	2× (yellow card) 5× (suspension)	Dr. Hassan Moustafa Sports Hall, 6th of October City; Referees: García, Marín (ESP)

16 January 2021; 19:00	Austria	28–35	France	Dr. Hassan Moustafa Sports Hall, 6th of October City; Referees: Grillo, Lenci (ARG)
16 January 2021; 19:00	Wagner 7	(13–17)	three players 4	Dr. Hassan Moustafa Sports Hall, 6th of October City; Referees: Grillo, Lenci (ARG)
16 January 2021; 19:00	3× (suspension)	Report	1× (yellow card) 4× (suspension)	Dr. Hassan Moustafa Sports Hall, 6th of October City; Referees: Grillo, Lenci (ARG)

16 January 2021; 21:30	Switzerland	25–31	Norway	Dr. Hassan Moustafa Sports Hall, 6th of October City; Referees: Gubica, Milošević (CRO)
16 January 2021; 21:30	Lier, Milosevic 7	(13–17)	Sagosen 11	Dr. Hassan Moustafa Sports Hall, 6th of October City; Referees: Gubica, Milošević (CRO)
16 January 2021; 21:30	1× (yellow card) 6× (suspension)	Report	1× (yellow card) 3× (suspension)	Dr. Hassan Moustafa Sports Hall, 6th of October City; Referees: Gubica, Milošević (CRO)

18 January 2021; 19:00	France	25–24	Switzerland	Dr. Hassan Moustafa Sports Hall, 6th of October City; Referees: Grillo, Lenci (ARG)
18 January 2021; 19:00	Mahé 7	(14–14)	Schmid 10	Dr. Hassan Moustafa Sports Hall, 6th of October City; Referees: Grillo, Lenci (ARG)
18 January 2021; 19:00	1× (yellow card) 3× (suspension)	Report	1× (yellow card) 5× (suspension)	Dr. Hassan Moustafa Sports Hall, 6th of October City; Referees: Grillo, Lenci (ARG)

18 January 2021; 21:30	Norway	38–29	Austria	Dr. Hassan Moustafa Sports Hall, 6th of October City; Referees: García, Marín (ESP)
18 January 2021; 21:30	Sagosen 9	(20–17)	Wagner, Weber 6	Dr. Hassan Moustafa Sports Hall, 6th of October City; Referees: García, Marín (ESP)
18 January 2021; 21:30	1× (yellow card) 4× (suspension)	Report	1× (yellow card) 4× (suspension)	Dr. Hassan Moustafa Sports Hall, 6th of October City; Referees: García, Marín (ESP)

=== Group F ===
Pos	Team	Pld	W	D	L	GF	GA	GD	Pts	Qualification
1	Portugal	3	3	0	0	84	62	+22	6	Main round
2	Iceland	3	2	0	1	93	72	+21	4	Main round
3	Algeria	3	1	0	2	67	88	−21	2	Main round
4	Morocco	3	0	0	3	66	88	−22	0	Presidents Cup

Source: IHF
Rules for classification: 1) points; 2) head-to-head points; 3) head-to-head goal difference; 4) head-to-head number of goals scored; 5) goal difference.

14 January 2021; 19:00	Algeria	24–23	Morocco	New Capital Sports Hall, New Administrative Capital; Referees: Hansen, Madsen (DEN)
14 January 2021; 19:00	Abdi 7	(8–15)	Rezzouki 6	New Capital Sports Hall, New Administrative Capital; Referees: Hansen, Madsen (DEN)
14 January 2021; 19:00	6× (suspension)	Report	1× (yellow card) 9× (suspension) 3× (red card)	New Capital Sports Hall, New Administrative Capital; Referees: Hansen, Madsen (DEN)

14 January 2021; 21:30	Portugal	25–23	Iceland	New Capital Sports Hall, New Administrative Capital; Referees: Horáček, Novotný (CZE)
14 January 2021; 21:30	Martins 6	(11–10)	Elísson 6	New Capital Sports Hall, New Administrative Capital; Referees: Horáček, Novotný (CZE)
14 January 2021; 21:30	2× (yellow card) 3× (suspension)	Report	3× (yellow card) 4× (suspension)	New Capital Sports Hall, New Administrative Capital; Referees: Horáček, Novotný (CZE)

16 January 2021; 19:00	Morocco	20–33	Portugal	New Capital Sports Hall, New Administrative Capital; Referees: Lah, Sok (SLO)
16 January 2021; 19:00	Harchaoui 5	(12–12)	Portela 9	New Capital Sports Hall, New Administrative Capital; Referees: Lah, Sok (SLO)
16 January 2021; 19:00	1× (yellow card) 7× (suspension)	Report	2× (suspension)	New Capital Sports Hall, New Administrative Capital; Referees: Lah, Sok (SLO)

16 January 2021; 21:30	Algeria	24–39	Iceland	New Capital Sports Hall, New Administrative Capital; Referees: Hansen, Madsen (DEN)
16 January 2021; 21:30	Abdi 5	(10–22)	Elísson 12	New Capital Sports Hall, New Administrative Capital; Referees: Hansen, Madsen (DEN)
16 January 2021; 21:30	1× (yellow card) 4× (suspension) 1× (red card)	Report	4× (suspension) 1× (red card)	New Capital Sports Hall, New Administrative Capital; Referees: Hansen, Madsen (DEN)

18 January 2021; 19:00	Portugal	26–19	Algeria	New Capital Sports Hall, New Administrative Capital; Referees: Pavićević, Ražnatović (MNE)
18 January 2021; 19:00	Portela 4	(14–9)	Berkous 7	New Capital Sports Hall, New Administrative Capital; Referees: Pavićević, Ražnatović (MNE)
18 January 2021; 19:00	6× (suspension) 1× (red card)	Report	1× (yellow card) 4× (suspension) 1× (red card)	New Capital Sports Hall, New Administrative Capital; Referees: Pavićević, Ražnatović (MNE)

18 January 2021; 21:30	Iceland	31–23	Morocco	New Capital Sports Hall, New Administrative Capital; Referees: Horáček, Novotný (CZE)
18 January 2021; 21:30	Guðmundsson, V. Kristjánsson 6	(15–10)	Zaroili 5	New Capital Sports Hall, New Administrative Capital; Referees: Horáček, Novotný (CZE)
18 January 2021; 21:30	1× (yellow card) 3× (suspension)	Report	1× (yellow card) 4× (suspension) 2× (red card) 1×	New Capital Sports Hall, New Administrative Capital; Referees: Horáček, Novotný (CZE)

=== Group G ===
Pos	Team	Pld	W	D	L	GF	GA	GD	Pts	Qualification
1	Sweden	3	3	0	0	97	69	+28	6	Main round
2	Egypt (H)	3	2	0	1	96	72	+24	4	Main round
3	North Macedonia (Note: North Macedonia replaced the Czech Republic, who withdrew due to a COVID-19 outbreak in the squad.)	3	1	0	2	71	99	−28	2	Main round
4	Chile	3	0	0	3	84	108	−24	0	Presidents Cup

Source: IHF
Rules for classification: 1) points; 2) head-to-head points; 3) head-to-head goal difference; 4) head-to-head number of goals scored; 5) goal difference.
(H) Hosts
Notes:

13 January 2021; 19:00	Egypt	35–29	Chile	Cairo Stadium Indoor Halls Complex, Cairo; Referees: Schulze, Tönnies (GER)
13 January 2021; 19:00	El-Deraa 6	(18–11)	E. Salinas 8	Cairo Stadium Indoor Halls Complex, Cairo; Referees: Schulze, Tönnies (GER)
13 January 2021; 19:00	2× (yellow card) 7× (suspension)	Report	2× (yellow card) 9× (suspension) 1× (red card)	Cairo Stadium Indoor Halls Complex, Cairo; Referees: Schulze, Tönnies (GER)

14 January 2021; 21:30	Sweden	32–20	North Macedonia	Cairo Stadium Indoor Halls Complex, Cairo; Referees: Jørum, Kleven (NOR)
14 January 2021; 21:30	Wanne 11	(16–11)	Lazarov 5	Cairo Stadium Indoor Halls Complex, Cairo; Referees: Jørum, Kleven (NOR)
14 January 2021; 21:30	2× (yellow card) 4× (suspension)	Report	1× (yellow card) 3× (suspension)	Cairo Stadium Indoor Halls Complex, Cairo; Referees: Jørum, Kleven (NOR)

16 January 2021; 19:00	Egypt	38–19	North Macedonia	Cairo Stadium Indoor Halls Complex, Cairo; Referees: C. Bonaventura, J. Bonaventura (FRA)
16 January 2021; 19:00	Mamdouh Shebib 8	(20–6)	three players 3	Cairo Stadium Indoor Halls Complex, Cairo; Referees: C. Bonaventura, J. Bonaventura (FRA)
16 January 2021; 19:00	2× (suspension)	Report	5× (suspension) 1× (red card)	Cairo Stadium Indoor Halls Complex, Cairo; Referees: C. Bonaventura, J. Bonaventura (FRA)

16 January 2021; 21:30	Chile	26–41	Sweden	Cairo Stadium Indoor Halls Complex, Cairo; Referees: Brunner, Salah (SUI)
16 January 2021; 21:30	Er. Feuchtmann 7	(16–20)	Pellas 12	Cairo Stadium Indoor Halls Complex, Cairo; Referees: Brunner, Salah (SUI)
16 January 2021; 21:30	8× (suspension) 1× (red card)	Report	1× (yellow card) 4× (suspension)	Cairo Stadium Indoor Halls Complex, Cairo; Referees: Brunner, Salah (SUI)

18 January 2021; 16:30	North Macedonia	32–29	Chile	Cairo Stadium Indoor Halls Complex, Cairo; Referees: Gubica, Milošević (CRO)
18 January 2021; 16:30	Lazarov 8	(16–17)	three players 7	Cairo Stadium Indoor Halls Complex, Cairo; Referees: Gubica, Milošević (CRO)
18 January 2021; 16:30	6× (suspension)	Report	1× (yellow card) 5× (suspension)	Cairo Stadium Indoor Halls Complex, Cairo; Referees: Gubica, Milošević (CRO)

18 January 2021; 19:00	Sweden	24–23	Egypt	Cairo Stadium Indoor Halls Complex, Cairo; Referees: Jørum, Kleven (NOR)
18 January 2021; 19:00	Persson 8	(9–12)	Sanad 8	Cairo Stadium Indoor Halls Complex, Cairo; Referees: Jørum, Kleven (NOR)
18 January 2021; 19:00	1× (yellow card) 2× (suspension)	Report	3× (suspension)	Cairo Stadium Indoor Halls Complex, Cairo; Referees: Jørum, Kleven (NOR)

=== Group H ===
Pos	Team	Pld	W	D	L	GF	GA	GD	Pts	Qualification
1	Russian Handball Federation	3	2	1	0	93	83	+10	5	Main round
2	Slovenia	3	2	0	1	105	85	+20	4	Main round
3	Belarus	3	1	1	1	89	85	+4	3	Main round
4	South Korea	3	0	0	3	79	113	−34	0	Presidents Cup

Source: IHF
Rules for classification: 1) points; 2) head-to-head points; 3) head-to-head goal difference; 4) head-to-head number of goals scored; 5) goal difference.

14 January 2021; 16:30	Belarus	32–32	Russian Handball Federation	Borg El Arab Sports Hall, Borg El Arab; Referees: Belkhiri, Hamidi (ALG)
14 January 2021; 16:30	Vailupau 10	(15–15)	three players 6	Borg El Arab Sports Hall, Borg El Arab; Referees: Belkhiri, Hamidi (ALG)
14 January 2021; 16:30	1× (yellow card) 6× (suspension)	Report	1× (yellow card) 5× (suspension) 1× (red card)	Borg El Arab Sports Hall, Borg El Arab; Referees: Belkhiri, Hamidi (ALG)

14 January 2021; 19:00	Slovenia	51–29	South Korea	Borg El Arab Sports Hall, Borg El Arab; Referees: Raluy, Sabroso (ESP)
14 January 2021; 19:00	Gajić 10	(25–16)	Kim Jin-h., Kim Jin-y. 6	Borg El Arab Sports Hall, Borg El Arab; Referees: Raluy, Sabroso (ESP)
14 January 2021; 19:00	1× (yellow card) 6× (suspension)	Report	2× (suspension)	Borg El Arab Sports Hall, Borg El Arab; Referees: Raluy, Sabroso (ESP)

16 January 2021; 16:30	Belarus	32–24	South Korea	Borg El Arab Sports Hall, Borg El Arab; Referees: Krichen, Makhlouf (TUN)
16 January 2021; 16:30	Vailupau 8	(15–9)	Kim Jin-y. 8	Borg El Arab Sports Hall, Borg El Arab; Referees: Krichen, Makhlouf (TUN)
16 January 2021; 16:30	1× (yellow card) 9× (suspension) 1× (red card)	Report	3× (suspension)	Borg El Arab Sports Hall, Borg El Arab; Referees: Krichen, Makhlouf (TUN)

16 January 2021; 19:00	Russian Handball Federation	31–25	Slovenia	Borg El Arab Sports Hall, Borg El Arab; Referees: Nachevski, Nikolov (MKD)
16 January 2021; 19:00	three players 6	(16–13)	Dolenec 6	Borg El Arab Sports Hall, Borg El Arab; Referees: Nachevski, Nikolov (MKD)
16 January 2021; 19:00	1× (yellow card) 5× (suspension)	Report	1× (yellow card) 4× (suspension)	Borg El Arab Sports Hall, Borg El Arab; Referees: Nachevski, Nikolov (MKD)

18 January 2021; 16:30	South Korea	26–30	Russian Handball Federation	Borg El Arab Sports Hall, Borg El Arab; Referees: Belkhiri, Hamidi (ALG)
18 January 2021; 16:30	Kim Ji-u. 8	(15–15)	Andreev, Kornev 5	Borg El Arab Sports Hall, Borg El Arab; Referees: Belkhiri, Hamidi (ALG)
18 January 2021; 16:30	1× (yellow card) 2× (suspension)	Report	2× (yellow card) 5× (suspension)	Borg El Arab Sports Hall, Borg El Arab; Referees: Belkhiri, Hamidi (ALG)

18 January 2021; 19:00	Slovenia	29–25	Belarus	Borg El Arab Sports Hall, Borg El Arab; Referees: Raluy, Sabroso (ESP)
18 January 2021; 19:00	Janc 8	(15–15)	Karalek 7	Borg El Arab Sports Hall, Borg El Arab; Referees: Raluy, Sabroso (ESP)
18 January 2021; 19:00	1× (yellow card) 5× (suspension)	Report	1× (yellow card) 5× (suspension)	Borg El Arab Sports Hall, Borg El Arab; Referees: Raluy, Sabroso (ESP)

== Presidents Cup ==
=== Group I ===
Pos	Team	Pld	W	D	L	GF	GA	GD	Pts	Qualification
1	Tunisia	3	3	0	0	82	51	+31	6	25th place game
2	DR Congo	3	2	0	1	64	69	−5	4	27th place game
3	Angola	3	1	0	2	70	66	+4	2	29th place game
4	Cape Verde	3	0	0	3	0	30	−30	0	31st place game

Source: IHF
Rules for classification: 1) points; 2) head-to-head points; 3) head-to-head goal difference; 4) head-to-head number of goals scored; 5) goal difference.

21 January 2021	Cape Verde	0–10	Tunisia

21 January 2021; 19:00	Angola	31–32	DR Congo	Dr. Hassan Moustafa Sports Hall, 6th of October City; Referees: Emam, Hedaia (EGY)
21 January 2021; 19:00	Ferreira 8	(15–13)	Kiangebeni 8	Dr. Hassan Moustafa Sports Hall, 6th of October City; Referees: Emam, Hedaia (EGY)
21 January 2021; 19:00	1× (yellow card) 2× (suspension) 1× (red card)	Report	1× (yellow card) 5× (suspension)	Dr. Hassan Moustafa Sports Hall, 6th of October City; Referees: Emam, Hedaia (EGY)

23 January 2021	Cape Verde	0–10	Angola

23 January 2021; 19:00	Tunisia	38–22	DR Congo	Dr. Hassan Moustafa Sports Hall, 6th of October City; Referees: Grillo, Lenci (ARG)
23 January 2021; 19:00	Toumi 7	(17–13)	Mvumbi 5	Dr. Hassan Moustafa Sports Hall, 6th of October City; Referees: Grillo, Lenci (ARG)
23 January 2021; 19:00	4× (suspension)	Report	2× (yellow card) 2× (suspension)	Dr. Hassan Moustafa Sports Hall, 6th of October City; Referees: Grillo, Lenci (ARG)

25 January 2021	DR Congo	10–0	Cape Verde

25 January 2021; 19:00	Tunisia	34–29	Angola	Dr. Hassan Moustafa Sports Hall, 6th of October City; Referees: Kolahdouzan, Mousaviannazhad (IRI)
25 January 2021; 19:00	Rzig 12	(14–13)	Hebo, Lopes 7	Dr. Hassan Moustafa Sports Hall, 6th of October City; Referees: Kolahdouzan, Mousaviannazhad (IRI)
25 January 2021; 19:00	1× (yellow card) 8× (suspension)	Report	1× (yellow card) 3× (suspension) 1× (red card)	Dr. Hassan Moustafa Sports Hall, 6th of October City; Referees: Kolahdouzan, Mousaviannazhad (IRI)

=== Group II ===
Pos	Team	Pld	W	D	L	GF	GA	GD	Pts	Qualification
1	Austria	3	3	0	0	105	82	+23	6	25th place game
2	Chile	3	2	0	1	103	83	+20	4	27th place game
3	Morocco	3	1	0	2	71	89	−18	2	29th place game
4	South Korea	3	0	0	3	87	112	−25	0	31st place game

Source: IHF
Rules for classification: 1) points; 2) head-to-head points; 3) head-to-head goal difference; 4) head-to-head number of goals scored; 5) goal difference.

20 January 2021; 16:30	Chile	44–33	South Korea	New Capital Sports Hall, New Administrative Capital; Referees: Belkhiri, Hamidi (ALG)
20 January 2021; 16:30	R. Salinas 12	(24–17)	Kim Jin-y. 8	New Capital Sports Hall, New Administrative Capital; Referees: Belkhiri, Hamidi (ALG)
20 January 2021; 16:30	2× (yellow card) 4× (suspension)	Report	5× (suspension)	New Capital Sports Hall, New Administrative Capital; Referees: Belkhiri, Hamidi (ALG)

20 January 2021; 19:00	Austria	36–22	Morocco	New Capital Sports Hall, New Administrative Capital; Referees: Brunner, Salah (SUI)
20 January 2021; 19:00	Frimmel 9	(17–14)	Rezzouki 7	New Capital Sports Hall, New Administrative Capital; Referees: Brunner, Salah (SUI)
20 January 2021; 19:00	2× (yellow card) 5× (suspension)	Report	4× (suspension)	New Capital Sports Hall, New Administrative Capital; Referees: Brunner, Salah (SUI)

22 January 2021; 16:30	Morocco	32–25	South Korea	New Capital Sports Hall, New Administrative Capital; Referees: Jørum, Kleven (NOR)
22 January 2021; 16:30	Fougani 7	(15–14)	Kim Jin-y. 9	New Capital Sports Hall, New Administrative Capital; Referees: Jørum, Kleven (NOR)
22 January 2021; 16:30	2× (yellow card) 5× (suspension) 1× (red card)	Report	4× (suspension)	New Capital Sports Hall, New Administrative Capital; Referees: Jørum, Kleven (NOR)

22 January 2021; 19:00	Austria	33–31	Chile	New Capital Sports Hall, New Administrative Capital; Referees: Brunner, Salah (SUI)
22 January 2021; 19:00	Frimmel 8	(14–15)	Er. Feuchtmann 9	New Capital Sports Hall, New Administrative Capital; Referees: Brunner, Salah (SUI)
22 January 2021; 19:00	1× (yellow card) 8× (suspension)	Report	1× (yellow card) 7× (suspension) 1×	New Capital Sports Hall, New Administrative Capital; Referees: Brunner, Salah (SUI)

24 January 2021; 16:30	Morocco	17–28	Chile	New Capital Sports Hall, New Administrative Capital; Referees: Pavićević, Ražnatović (MNE)
24 January 2021; 16:30	Harchaoui 6	(12–14)	E. Salinas 7	New Capital Sports Hall, New Administrative Capital; Referees: Pavićević, Ražnatović (MNE)
24 January 2021; 16:30	2× (yellow card) 6× (suspension)	Report	4× (suspension)	New Capital Sports Hall, New Administrative Capital; Referees: Pavićević, Ražnatović (MNE)

24 January 2021; 19:00	South Korea	29–36	Austria	New Capital Sports Hall, New Administrative Capital; Referees: Emam, Hedaia (EGY)
24 January 2021; 19:00	Kang, Kim Jin-y. 4	(14–18)	Pratschner 9	New Capital Sports Hall, New Administrative Capital; Referees: Emam, Hedaia (EGY)
24 January 2021; 19:00	1× (yellow card) 1× (suspension)	Report	2× (yellow card) 3× (suspension)	New Capital Sports Hall, New Administrative Capital; Referees: Emam, Hedaia (EGY)

=== 31st place game ===
27 January 2021	Cape Verde	0–10	South Korea

=== 29th place game ===
27 January 2021
18:30
Angola
29–30 (ET)
Morocco
Dr. Hassan Moustafa Sports Hall, 6th of October City
Referees: Belkhiri, Hamidi (ALG)
Ferreira, Hebo 6
(14–13)
Rezzouki 12
5× (suspension)
Report
3× (yellow card) 4× (suspension)

FT: 27–27 ET: 0–0, 0–0 Pen: 2–3

=== 27th place game ===
27 January 2021; 16:00	DR Congo	30–35	Chile	New Capital Sports Hall, New Administrative Capital; Referees: Krichen, Makhlouf (TUN)
27 January 2021; 16:00	Ngando 8	(13–18)	three players 6	New Capital Sports Hall, New Administrative Capital; Referees: Krichen, Makhlouf (TUN)
27 January 2021; 16:00	3× (suspension)	Report	1× (yellow card) 1× (suspension)	New Capital Sports Hall, New Administrative Capital; Referees: Krichen, Makhlouf (TUN)

=== 25th place game ===
27 January 2021; 18:30	Tunisia	37–33	Austria	New Capital Sports Hall, New Administrative Capital; Referees: Grillo, Lenci (ARG)
27 January 2021; 18:30	Sanaï 8	(19–16)	Frimmel, Wagner 7	New Capital Sports Hall, New Administrative Capital; Referees: Grillo, Lenci (ARG)
27 January 2021; 18:30	2× (yellow card) 4× (suspension)	Report	2× (yellow card) 3× (suspension)	New Capital Sports Hall, New Administrative Capital; Referees: Grillo, Lenci (ARG)

== Main round ==
All points obtained in the preliminary round against teams that advance as well, are carried over.

=== Group I ===
Pos	Team	Pld	W	D	L	GF	GA	GD	Pts	Qualification
1	Spain	5	4	1	0	162	134	+28	9	Quarterfinals
2	Hungary	5	4	0	1	160	131	+29	8	Quarterfinals
3	Germany	5	2	1	2	153	122	+31	5 (Note: Poland 23–23 Germany; goal difference: Germany +31 and Poland +19)	
4	Poland	5	2	1	2	138	119	+19	5	
5	Brazil	5	1	1	3	136	139	−3	3	
6	Uruguay	5	0	0	5	88	192	−104	0	

Source: IHF
Rules for classification: 1) points; 2) head-to-head points; 3) head-to-head goal difference; 4) head-to-head number of goals scored; 5) goal difference.
Notes:

21 January 2021; 16:30	Uruguay	16–30	Poland	New Capital Sports Hall, New Administrative Capital; Referees: Belkhiri, Hamidi (ALG)
21 January 2021; 16:30	Cancio 6	(9–14)	Moryto 8	New Capital Sports Hall, New Administrative Capital; Referees: Belkhiri, Hamidi (ALG)
21 January 2021; 16:30	1× (suspension)	Report	1× (yellow card) 6× (suspension)	New Capital Sports Hall, New Administrative Capital; Referees: Belkhiri, Hamidi (ALG)

21 January 2021; 19:00	Hungary	29–23	Brazil	New Capital Sports Hall, New Administrative Capital; Referees: Brunner, Salah (SUI)
21 January 2021; 19:00	Bánhidi 5	(16–11)	Langaro 8	New Capital Sports Hall, New Administrative Capital; Referees: Brunner, Salah (SUI)
21 January 2021; 19:00	2× (yellow card) 4× (suspension)	Report	3× (suspension)	New Capital Sports Hall, New Administrative Capital; Referees: Brunner, Salah (SUI)

21 January 2021; 21:30	Spain	32–28	Germany	New Capital Sports Hall, New Administrative Capital; Referees: Gubica, Milošević (CRO)
21 January 2021; 21:30	Fernández Pérez 6	(16–13)	Kastening 7	New Capital Sports Hall, New Administrative Capital; Referees: Gubica, Milošević (CRO)
21 January 2021; 21:30	1× (yellow card) 3× (suspension)	Report	2× (yellow card) 5× (suspension) 1× (red card)	New Capital Sports Hall, New Administrative Capital; Referees: Gubica, Milošević (CRO)

23 January 2021; 16:30	Uruguay	23–38	Spain	New Capital Sports Hall, New Administrative Capital; Referees: Emam, Hedaia (EGY)
23 January 2021; 16:30	Cancio 8	(12–24)	Ariño 8	New Capital Sports Hall, New Administrative Capital; Referees: Emam, Hedaia (EGY)
23 January 2021; 16:30	1× (yellow card) 3× (suspension)	Report	1× (yellow card) 5× (suspension)	New Capital Sports Hall, New Administrative Capital; Referees: Emam, Hedaia (EGY)

23 January 2021; 19:00	Poland	26–30	Hungary	New Capital Sports Hall, New Administrative Capital; Referees: Gubica, Milošević (CRO)
23 January 2021; 19:00	Sićko 5	(10–16)	Lékai 8	New Capital Sports Hall, New Administrative Capital; Referees: Gubica, Milošević (CRO)
23 January 2021; 19:00	3× (suspension)	Report	1× (yellow card) 3× (suspension)	New Capital Sports Hall, New Administrative Capital; Referees: Gubica, Milošević (CRO)

23 January 2021; 21:30	Germany	31–24	Brazil	New Capital Sports Hall, New Administrative Capital; Referees: Jørum, Kleven (NOR)
23 January 2021; 21:30	Golla 7	(16–12)	Moraes Ferreira 6	New Capital Sports Hall, New Administrative Capital; Referees: Jørum, Kleven (NOR)
23 January 2021; 21:30	1× (yellow card) 6× (suspension)	Report	1× (yellow card) 3× (suspension)	New Capital Sports Hall, New Administrative Capital; Referees: Jørum, Kleven (NOR)

25 January 2021; 16:30	Brazil	37–17	Uruguay	New Capital Sports Hall, New Administrative Capital; Referees: Krichen, Makhlouf (TUN)
25 January 2021; 16:30	Luciano 7	(18–7)	three players 3	New Capital Sports Hall, New Administrative Capital; Referees: Krichen, Makhlouf (TUN)
25 January 2021; 16:30	1× (yellow card) 2× (suspension)	Report	2× (suspension)	New Capital Sports Hall, New Administrative Capital; Referees: Krichen, Makhlouf (TUN)

25 January 2021; 19:00	Spain	36–28	Hungary	New Capital Sports Hall, New Administrative Capital; Referees: Nachevski, Nikolov (MKD)
25 January 2021; 19:00	Solé 8	(21–14)	Balogh, Győri 5	New Capital Sports Hall, New Administrative Capital; Referees: Nachevski, Nikolov (MKD)
25 January 2021; 19:00	1× (yellow card) 5× (suspension)	Report	1× (yellow card) 4× (suspension)	New Capital Sports Hall, New Administrative Capital; Referees: Nachevski, Nikolov (MKD)

25 January 2021; 21:30	Poland	23–23	Germany	New Capital Sports Hall, New Administrative Capital; Referees: Pavićević, Ražnatović (MNE)
25 January 2021; 21:30	Krajewski 5	(12–11)	Schmidt, Weber 4	New Capital Sports Hall, New Administrative Capital; Referees: Pavićević, Ražnatović (MNE)
25 January 2021; 21:30	1× (yellow card) 5× (suspension)	Report	1× (yellow card) 4× (suspension)	New Capital Sports Hall, New Administrative Capital; Referees: Pavićević, Ražnatović (MNE)

=== Group II ===
Pos	Team	Pld	W	D	L	GF	GA	GD	Pts	Qualification
1	Denmark	5	5	0	0	169	116	+53	10	Quarterfinals
2	Qatar	5	3	0	2	132	135	−3	6 (Note: Argentina 25–26 Qatar)	Quarterfinals
3	Argentina	5	3	0	2	120	121	−1	6	
4	Croatia	5	2	1	2	128	132	−4	5	
5	Japan	5	1	1	3	138	147	−9	3	
6	Bahrain	5	0	0	5	107	143	−36	0	

Source: IHF
Rules for classification: 1) points; 2) head-to-head points; 3) head-to-head goal difference; 4) head-to-head number of goals scored; 5) goal difference.
Notes:

21 January 2021; 16:30	Japan	24–28	Argentina	Cairo Stadium Indoor Halls Complex, Cairo; Referees: Kolahdouzan, Mousaviannazhad (IRI)
21 January 2021; 16:30	Yoshino 6	(13–17)	Pizarro 10	Cairo Stadium Indoor Halls Complex, Cairo; Referees: Kolahdouzan, Mousaviannazhad (IRI)
21 January 2021; 16:30	2× (yellow card) 2× (suspension)	Report	3× (yellow card) 2× (suspension)	Cairo Stadium Indoor Halls Complex, Cairo; Referees: Kolahdouzan, Mousaviannazhad (IRI)

21 January 2021; 19:00	Croatia	28–18	Bahrain	Cairo Stadium Indoor Halls Complex, Cairo; Referees: C. Bonaventura, J. Bonaventura (FRA)
21 January 2021; 19:00	Horvat 8	(13–8)	Ahmed, Al-Sayyad 6	Cairo Stadium Indoor Halls Complex, Cairo; Referees: C. Bonaventura, J. Bonaventura (FRA)
21 January 2021; 19:00	2× (suspension)	Report	1× (yellow card) 3× (suspension)	Cairo Stadium Indoor Halls Complex, Cairo; Referees: C. Bonaventura, J. Bonaventura (FRA)

21 January 2021; 21:30	Denmark	32–23	Qatar	Cairo Stadium Indoor Halls Complex, Cairo; Referees: Pavićević, Ražnatović (MNE)
21 January 2021; 21:30	M. Hansen 8	(17–12)	Frankis 12	Cairo Stadium Indoor Halls Complex, Cairo; Referees: Pavićević, Ražnatović (MNE)
21 January 2021; 21:30	4× (suspension)	Report	3× (yellow card) 7× (suspension)	Cairo Stadium Indoor Halls Complex, Cairo; Referees: Pavićević, Ražnatović (MNE)

23 January 2021; 16:30	Qatar	28–23	Bahrain	Cairo Stadium Indoor Halls Complex, Cairo; Referees: García, Marín (ESP)
23 January 2021; 16:30	Capote 9	(13–14)	Ahmed 5	Cairo Stadium Indoor Halls Complex, Cairo; Referees: García, Marín (ESP)
23 January 2021; 16:30	2× (suspension)	Report	2× (yellow card) 4× (suspension)	Cairo Stadium Indoor Halls Complex, Cairo; Referees: García, Marín (ESP)

23 January 2021; 19:00	Argentina	23–19	Croatia	Cairo Stadium Indoor Halls Complex, Cairo; Referees: Pavićević, Ražnatović (MNE)
23 January 2021; 19:00	Pizarro 4	(12–12)	Čupić 7	Cairo Stadium Indoor Halls Complex, Cairo; Referees: Pavićević, Ražnatović (MNE)
23 January 2021; 19:00	1× (yellow card) 5× (suspension) 1× (red card)	Report	1× (yellow card) 4× (suspension)	Cairo Stadium Indoor Halls Complex, Cairo; Referees: Pavićević, Ražnatović (MNE)

23 January 2021; 21:30	Japan	27–34	Denmark	Cairo Stadium Indoor Halls Complex, Cairo; Referees: Nachevski, Nikolov (MKD)
23 January 2021; 21:30	Agarie 7	(17–19)	Jakobsen 12	Cairo Stadium Indoor Halls Complex, Cairo; Referees: Nachevski, Nikolov (MKD)
23 January 2021; 21:30	1× (yellow card) 5× (suspension)	Report	1× (yellow card) 3× (suspension) 1× (red card)	Cairo Stadium Indoor Halls Complex, Cairo; Referees: Nachevski, Nikolov (MKD)

25 January 2021; 16:30	Bahrain	25–29	Japan	Cairo Stadium Indoor Halls Complex, Cairo; Referees: C. Bonaventura, J. Bonaventura (FRA)
25 January 2021; 16:30	Ahmed, Al-Sayyad 5	(12–19)	Yoshino 9	Cairo Stadium Indoor Halls Complex, Cairo; Referees: C. Bonaventura, J. Bonaventura (FRA)
25 January 2021; 16:30	1× (yellow card) 5× (suspension)	Report	2× (suspension)	Cairo Stadium Indoor Halls Complex, Cairo; Referees: C. Bonaventura, J. Bonaventura (FRA)

25 January 2021; 19:00	Argentina	25–26	Qatar	Cairo Stadium Indoor Halls Complex, Cairo; Referees: Horáček, Novotný (CZE)
25 January 2021; 19:00	Pizarro 7	(13–12)	Frankis 8	Cairo Stadium Indoor Halls Complex, Cairo; Referees: Horáček, Novotný (CZE)
25 January 2021; 19:00	2× (yellow card) 5× (suspension)	Report	1× (yellow card) 3× (suspension)	Cairo Stadium Indoor Halls Complex, Cairo; Referees: Horáček, Novotný (CZE)

25 January 2021; 21:30	Denmark	38–26	Croatia	Cairo Stadium Indoor Halls Complex, Cairo; Referees: Raluy, Sabroso (ESP)
25 January 2021; 21:30	Jakobsen 8	(17–15)	Marić 6	Cairo Stadium Indoor Halls Complex, Cairo; Referees: Raluy, Sabroso (ESP)
25 January 2021; 21:30	3× (suspension)	Report	1× (yellow card) 3× (suspension)	Cairo Stadium Indoor Halls Complex, Cairo; Referees: Raluy, Sabroso (ESP)

=== Group III ===
Pos	Team	Pld	W	D	L	GF	GA	GD	Pts	Qualification
1	France	5	5	0	0	142	123	+19	10	Quarterfinals
2	Norway	5	4	0	1	155	137	+18	8	Quarterfinals
3	Portugal	5	3	0	2	135	132	+3	6	
4	Switzerland	5	2	0	3	125	131	−6	4	
5	Iceland	5	1	0	4	139	132	+7	2	
6	Algeria	5	0	0	5	116	157	−41	0	

Source: IHF
Rules for classification: 1) points; 2) head-to-head points; 3) head-to-head goal difference; 4) head-to-head number of goals scored; 5) goal difference.

20 January 2021; 16:30	Switzerland	20–18	Iceland	Dr. Hassan Moustafa Sports Hall, 6th of October City; Referees: Schulze, Tönnies (GER)
20 January 2021; 16:30	Schmid 6	(10–9)	Guðmundsson 4	Dr. Hassan Moustafa Sports Hall, 6th of October City; Referees: Schulze, Tönnies (GER)
20 January 2021; 16:30	2× (yellow card) 5× (suspension)	Report	2× (yellow card) 2× (suspension) 1× (red card)	Dr. Hassan Moustafa Sports Hall, 6th of October City; Referees: Schulze, Tönnies (GER)

20 January 2021; 19:00	France	29–26	Algeria	Dr. Hassan Moustafa Sports Hall, 6th of October City; Referees: Grillo, Lenci (ARG)
20 January 2021; 19:00	three players 4	(16–14)	Berkous 7	Dr. Hassan Moustafa Sports Hall, 6th of October City; Referees: Grillo, Lenci (ARG)
20 January 2021; 19:00	3× (suspension)	Report	1× (yellow card) 5× (suspension)	Dr. Hassan Moustafa Sports Hall, 6th of October City; Referees: Grillo, Lenci (ARG)

20 January 2021; 21:30	Portugal	28–29	Norway	Dr. Hassan Moustafa Sports Hall, 6th of October City; Referees: Raluy, Sabroso (ESP)
20 January 2021; 21:30	Martins, Portela 5	(14–16)	Sagosen 6	Dr. Hassan Moustafa Sports Hall, 6th of October City; Referees: Raluy, Sabroso (ESP)
20 January 2021; 21:30	3× (yellow card) 7× (suspension) 1× (red card)	Report	1× (yellow card) 4× (suspension)	Dr. Hassan Moustafa Sports Hall, 6th of October City; Referees: Raluy, Sabroso (ESP)

22 January 2021; 16:30	Switzerland	29–33	Portugal	Dr. Hassan Moustafa Sports Hall, 6th of October City; Referees: García, Marín (ESP)
22 January 2021; 16:30	Schmid 11	(15–17)	Iturriza 7	Dr. Hassan Moustafa Sports Hall, 6th of October City; Referees: García, Marín (ESP)
22 January 2021; 16:30	4× (suspension)	Report	1× (yellow card) 3× (suspension)	Dr. Hassan Moustafa Sports Hall, 6th of October City; Referees: García, Marín (ESP)

22 January 2021; 19:00	Iceland	26–28	France	Dr. Hassan Moustafa Sports Hall, 6th of October City; Referees: Raluy, Sabroso (ESP)
22 January 2021; 19:00	Elísson 8	(14–16)	Mem 7	Dr. Hassan Moustafa Sports Hall, 6th of October City; Referees: Raluy, Sabroso (ESP)
22 January 2021; 19:00	2× (yellow card) 5× (suspension) 1× (red card)	Report	5× (suspension)	Dr. Hassan Moustafa Sports Hall, 6th of October City; Referees: Raluy, Sabroso (ESP)

22 January 2021; 21:30	Norway	36–23	Algeria	Dr. Hassan Moustafa Sports Hall, 6th of October City; Referees: Schulze, Tönnies (GER)
22 January 2021; 21:30	Blonz 7	(17–11)	Abdi 7	Dr. Hassan Moustafa Sports Hall, 6th of October City; Referees: Schulze, Tönnies (GER)
22 January 2021; 21:30	2× (yellow card) 3× (suspension)	Report	1× (yellow card) 4× (suspension) 1× (red card)	Dr. Hassan Moustafa Sports Hall, 6th of October City; Referees: Schulze, Tönnies (GER)

24 January 2021; 16:30	Algeria	24–27	Switzerland	Dr. Hassan Moustafa Sports Hall, 6th of October City; Referees: Grillo, Lenci (ARG)
24 January 2021; 16:30	Abdi 6	(13–15)	Schmid 9	Dr. Hassan Moustafa Sports Hall, 6th of October City; Referees: Grillo, Lenci (ARG)
24 January 2021; 16:30	1× (yellow card) 4× (suspension)	Report	1× (yellow card) 2× (suspension)	Dr. Hassan Moustafa Sports Hall, 6th of October City; Referees: Grillo, Lenci (ARG)

24 January 2021; 19:00	Iceland	33–35	Norway	Dr. Hassan Moustafa Sports Hall, 6th of October City; Referees: Nachevski, Nikolov (MKD)
24 January 2021; 19:00	Elísson 6	(18–18)	Sagosen 8	Dr. Hassan Moustafa Sports Hall, 6th of October City; Referees: Nachevski, Nikolov (MKD)
24 January 2021; 19:00	2× (yellow card) 8× (suspension) 1× (red card)	Report	2× (yellow card) 8× (suspension)	Dr. Hassan Moustafa Sports Hall, 6th of October City; Referees: Nachevski, Nikolov (MKD)

24 January 2021; 21:30	Portugal	23–32	France	Dr. Hassan Moustafa Sports Hall, 6th of October City; Referees: Gubica, Milošević (CRO)
24 January 2021; 21:30	Martins 6	(12–16)	Descat 8	Dr. Hassan Moustafa Sports Hall, 6th of October City; Referees: Gubica, Milošević (CRO)
24 January 2021; 21:30	2× (yellow card) 4× (suspension)	Report	2× (yellow card) 2× (suspension)	Dr. Hassan Moustafa Sports Hall, 6th of October City; Referees: Gubica, Milošević (CRO)

=== Group IV ===
Pos	Team	Pld	W	D	L	GF	GA	GD	Pts	Qualification
1	Sweden	5	3	2	0	144	117	+27	8	Quarterfinals
2	Egypt (H)	5	3	1	1	149	117	+32	7	Quarterfinals
3	Slovenia	5	2	2	1	138	130	+8	6	
4	Russian Handball Federation	5	2	1	2	138	139	−1	5	
5	Belarus	5	1	2	2	139	148	−9	4	
6	North Macedonia	5	0	0	5	106	163	−57	0	

Source: IHF
Rules for classification: 1) points; 2) head-to-head points; 3) head-to-head goal difference; 4) head-to-head number of goals scored; 5) goal difference.
(H) Hosts

20 January 2021; 16:30	North Macedonia	21–31	Slovenia	Cairo Stadium Indoor Halls Complex, Cairo; Referees: García, Marín (ESP)
20 January 2021; 16:30	Lazarov 5	(9–13)	Gajić 7	Cairo Stadium Indoor Halls Complex, Cairo; Referees: García, Marín (ESP)
20 January 2021; 16:30	1× (yellow card) 2× (suspension)	Report	1× (yellow card) 2× (suspension)	Cairo Stadium Indoor Halls Complex, Cairo; Referees: García, Marín (ESP)

20 January 2021; 19:00	Russian Handball Federation	23–28	Egypt	Cairo Stadium Indoor Halls Complex, Cairo; Referees: Horáček, Novotný (CZE)
20 January 2021; 19:00	Kosorotov 8	(8–15)	Mamdouh Shebib 7	Cairo Stadium Indoor Halls Complex, Cairo; Referees: Horáček, Novotný (CZE)
20 January 2021; 19:00	1× (yellow card) 7× (suspension)	Report	3× (suspension)	Cairo Stadium Indoor Halls Complex, Cairo; Referees: Horáček, Novotný (CZE)

20 January 2021; 21:30	Sweden	26–26	Belarus	Cairo Stadium Indoor Halls Complex, Cairo; Referees: C. Bonaventura, J. Bonaventura (FRA)
20 January 2021; 21:30	Wanne 7	(11–15)	Vailupau, Yurynok 6	Cairo Stadium Indoor Halls Complex, Cairo; Referees: C. Bonaventura, J. Bonaventura (FRA)
20 January 2021; 21:30	3× (suspension)	Report	1× (yellow card) 4× (suspension)	Cairo Stadium Indoor Halls Complex, Cairo; Referees: C. Bonaventura, J. Bonaventura (FRA)

22 January 2021; 16:30	North Macedonia	20–32	Russian Handball Federation	Cairo Stadium Indoor Halls Complex, Cairo; Referees: C. Bonaventura, J. Bonaventura (FRA)
22 January 2021; 16:30	Kuzmanovski 6	(9–19)	Soroka 6	Cairo Stadium Indoor Halls Complex, Cairo; Referees: C. Bonaventura, J. Bonaventura (FRA)
22 January 2021; 16:30	1× (yellow card) 6× (suspension)	Report	1× (yellow card) 2× (suspension) 1× (red card)	Cairo Stadium Indoor Halls Complex, Cairo; Referees: C. Bonaventura, J. Bonaventura (FRA)

22 January 2021; 19:00	Egypt	35–26	Belarus	Cairo Stadium Indoor Halls Complex, Cairo; Referees: Nachevski, Nikolov (MKD)
22 January 2021; 19:00	El-Ahmar 8	(21–14)	Vailupau 4	Cairo Stadium Indoor Halls Complex, Cairo; Referees: Nachevski, Nikolov (MKD)
22 January 2021; 19:00	1× (suspension)	Report	1× (yellow card) 3× (suspension)	Cairo Stadium Indoor Halls Complex, Cairo; Referees: Nachevski, Nikolov (MKD)

22 January 2021; 21:30	Slovenia	28–28	Sweden	Cairo Stadium Indoor Halls Complex, Cairo; Referees: Horáček, Novotný (CZE)
22 January 2021; 21:30	Gajić 6	(14–15)	Wanne 7	Cairo Stadium Indoor Halls Complex, Cairo; Referees: Horáček, Novotný (CZE)
22 January 2021; 21:30	1× (yellow card) 5× (suspension)	Report	2× (yellow card) 8× (suspension) 1× (red card)	Cairo Stadium Indoor Halls Complex, Cairo; Referees: Horáček, Novotný (CZE)

24 January 2021; 16:30	Belarus	30–26	North Macedonia	Cairo Stadium Indoor Halls Complex, Cairo; Referees: Kolahdouzan, Mousaviannazhad (IRI)
24 January 2021; 16:30	Kulesh 7	(14–14)	Lazarov 7	Cairo Stadium Indoor Halls Complex, Cairo; Referees: Kolahdouzan, Mousaviannazhad (IRI)
24 January 2021; 16:30	2× (yellow card) 3× (suspension)	Report	1× (yellow card) 1× (suspension)	Cairo Stadium Indoor Halls Complex, Cairo; Referees: Kolahdouzan, Mousaviannazhad (IRI)

24 January 2021; 19:00	Slovenia	25–25	Egypt	Cairo Stadium Indoor Halls Complex, Cairo; Referees: Schulze, Tönnies (GER)
24 January 2021; 19:00	Janc 7	(12–8)	Sanad 7	Cairo Stadium Indoor Halls Complex, Cairo; Referees: Schulze, Tönnies (GER)
24 January 2021; 19:00	2× (yellow card) 6× (suspension)	Report	2× (suspension)	Cairo Stadium Indoor Halls Complex, Cairo; Referees: Schulze, Tönnies (GER)

24 January 2021; 21:30	Russian Handball Federation	20–34	Sweden	Cairo Stadium Indoor Halls Complex, Cairo; Referees: García, Marín (ESP)
24 January 2021; 21:30	Kotov 5	(8–17)	Pellas 8	Cairo Stadium Indoor Halls Complex, Cairo; Referees: García, Marín (ESP)
24 January 2021; 21:30	1× (yellow card) 5× (suspension) 1× (red card)	Report	1× (yellow card) 5× (suspension)	Cairo Stadium Indoor Halls Complex, Cairo; Referees: García, Marín (ESP)

== Final round ==
=== Bracket ===
Quarter-finals
27 January
Spain	31
Norway	26
27 January
Denmark (Pen.)	35 (4)
Egypt	35 (3)
27 January
France (ET)	35
Hungary	32
27 January
Sweden	35
Qatar	23

Semi-finals
29 January
Spain	33
Denmark	35
29 January
France	26
Sweden	32

Final
31 January
Denmark	26
Sweden	24
Third place
31 January
Spain	35
France	29

=== Quarterfinals ===
27 January 2021
18:30
Denmark
39–38 (ET)
Egypt
Cairo Stadium Indoor Halls Complex, Cairo
Referees: Gubica, Milošević (CRO)
M. Hansen 10
(16–13)
Omar 11
1× (yellow card) 3× (suspension) 1× (red card)
Report
5× (suspension) 1× (red card)

FT: 28–28 ET: 6–6, 1–1 Pen: 4–3

27 January 2021; 21:30	Sweden	35–23	Qatar	Cairo Stadium Indoor Halls Complex, Cairo; Referees: C. Bonaventura, J. Bonaventura (FRA)
27 January 2021; 21:30	Chrintz, Pellas 8	(14–10)	Frankis 5	Cairo Stadium Indoor Halls Complex, Cairo; Referees: C. Bonaventura, J. Bonaventura (FRA)
27 January 2021; 21:30	3× (suspension)	Report	3× (suspension)	Cairo Stadium Indoor Halls Complex, Cairo; Referees: C. Bonaventura, J. Bonaventura (FRA)

27 January 2021; 21:30	Spain	31–26	Norway	New Capital Sports Hall, New Administrative Capital; Referees: Nachevski, Nikolov (MKD)
27 January 2021; 21:30	A. Dujshebaev 8	(21–15)	Jøndal 6	New Capital Sports Hall, New Administrative Capital; Referees: Nachevski, Nikolov (MKD)
27 January 2021; 21:30	1× (yellow card) 3× (suspension)	Report	1× (yellow card) 3× (suspension)	New Capital Sports Hall, New Administrative Capital; Referees: Nachevski, Nikolov (MKD)

27 January 2021
21:30
France
35–32 (ET)
Hungary
Dr. Hassan Moustafa Sports Hall, 6th of October City
Referees: García, Marín (ESP)
Guigou 6
(12–14)
Bánhidi 6
2× (yellow card) 4× (suspension)
Report
2× (yellow card) 3× (suspension)

FT: 30–30 ET: 5–2

=== Semifinals ===
29 January 2021; 18:30	France	26–32	Sweden	Cairo Stadium Indoor Halls Complex, Cairo; Referees: Schulze, Tönnies (GER)
29 January 2021; 18:30	Descat 5	(13–16)	Wanne 11	Cairo Stadium Indoor Halls Complex, Cairo; Referees: Schulze, Tönnies (GER)
29 January 2021; 18:30	4× (suspension) 1× (red card)	Report	2× (yellow card) 4× (suspension)	Cairo Stadium Indoor Halls Complex, Cairo; Referees: Schulze, Tönnies (GER)

29 January 2021; 21:30	Spain	33–35	Denmark	Cairo Stadium Indoor Halls Complex, Cairo; Referees: Horáček, Novotný (CZE)
29 January 2021; 21:30	D. Dujshebaev 7	(16–18)	M. Hansen 12	Cairo Stadium Indoor Halls Complex, Cairo; Referees: Horáček, Novotný (CZE)
29 January 2021; 21:30	1× (yellow card) 3× (suspension)	Report	2× (yellow card) 3× (suspension) 1× (red card)	Cairo Stadium Indoor Halls Complex, Cairo; Referees: Horáček, Novotný (CZE)

=== Third place game ===
31 January 2021; 15:30	Spain	35–29	France	Cairo Stadium Indoor Halls Complex, Cairo; Referees: Gubica, Milošević (CRO)
31 January 2021; 15:30	A. Dujshebaev 8	(16–13)	Descat 7	Cairo Stadium Indoor Halls Complex, Cairo; Referees: Gubica, Milošević (CRO)
31 January 2021; 15:30	1× (yellow card) 1× (suspension)	Report	2× (yellow card) 1× (suspension)	Cairo Stadium Indoor Halls Complex, Cairo; Referees: Gubica, Milošević (CRO)

=== Final ===
31 January 2021; 18:30	Denmark	26–24	Sweden	Cairo Stadium Indoor Halls Complex, Cairo; Referees: Raluy, Sabroso (ESP)
31 January 2021; 18:30	M. Hansen 7	(13–13)	Wanne 5	Cairo Stadium Indoor Halls Complex, Cairo; Referees: Raluy, Sabroso (ESP)
31 January 2021; 18:30	4× (yellow card) 4× (suspension)	Report	2× (yellow card) 3× (suspension)	Cairo Stadium Indoor Halls Complex, Cairo; Referees: Raluy, Sabroso (ESP)

== Final ranking and awards ==
=== Final ranking ===
Places 1 to 4 and 25 to 32 were decided by play-off or knock-out. The losers of the quarter-finals were ranked 5th to 8th according to the places in the main round, points gained and goal difference. Teams finishing third in the main round were ranked 9th to 12th, teams finishing fourth in the main round were ranked 13th to 16th, teams finishing fifth in the main round were ranked 17th to 20th and teams ranked sixth were ranked 21st to 24th. In case of a tie in points gained, the goal difference of the main round were taken into account, then number of goals scored. If teams would still be equal, number of points gained in the preliminary round would be considered followed by the goal difference and then number of goals scored in the preliminary round.

Rank	Team
1st place, gold medalist(s)	Denmark
2nd place, silver medalist(s)	Sweden
3rd place, bronze medalist(s)	Spain
4	France
5	Hungary
6	Norway
7	Egypt
8	Qatar
9	Slovenia
10	Portugal
11	Argentina
12	Germany
13	Poland
14	(Russia) Russian Handball Federation
15	Croatia
16	Switzerland
17	Belarus
18	Brazil
19	Japan
20	Iceland
21	Bahrain
22	Algeria
23	North Macedonia
24	Uruguay
25	Tunisia
26	Austria
27	Chile
28	DR Congo
29	Morocco
30	Angola
31	South Korea
32	Cape Verde

Qualified for the 2023 World Men's Handball Championship

2021 Men's World Champions

Denmark
Second title

Team roster: Niklas Landin Jacobsen, Magnus Landin Jacobsen, Magnus Bramming, Emil Jakobsen, Emil Nielsen, Anders Zachariassen, Magnus Saugstrup, Lasse Svan Hansen, Kevin Møller, Henrik Møllgaard, Mads Mensah Larsen, Mikkel Hansen, Morten Olsen, Jóhan Hansen, Lasse Andersson, Nikolaj Øris Nielsen, Jacob Holm, Mathias Gidsel, Simon Hald, Nikolaj Læsø
Head coach: Nikolaj Jacobsen

=== All-star Team ===
The All-star Team was announced on 31 January 2021.

Position	Player
Goalkeeper	(Sweden) Andreas Palicka
Left wing	(Sweden) Hampus Wanne
Left back	(Denmark) Mikkel Hansen
Centre back	(Sweden) Jim Gottfridsson
Right back	(Denmark) Mathias Gidsel
Right wing	(Spain) Ferran Solé
Pivot	(France) Ludovic Fabregas
MVP	(Denmark) Mikkel Hansen

== Statistics ==
=== Top goalscorers ===
Rank	Name	Goals	Shots	%
1	(Qatar) Frankis Marzo	58	96	60
2	(Norway) Sander Sagosen	54	83	65
3	(Sweden) Hampus Wanne	53	71	75
4	(Chile) Erwin Feuchtmann	49	78	63
5	(Denmark) Mikkel Hansen	48	69	70
6	(Switzerland) Andy Schmid	44	80	55
7	(Tunisia) Mohamed Darmoul	40	49	82
8	(Denmark) Mathias Gidsel	39	49	80
8	(South Korea) Kim Jin-young	39	72	54
8	(Chile) Rodrigo Salinas Muñoz	39	59	66

Source: IHF

=== Top goalkeepers ===
Rank	Name	%	Saves	Shots
1	(Portugal) Humberto Gomes	43	33	76
2	(Germany) Johannes Bitter	36	33	92
2	(Slovenia) Urban Lesjak	36	27	76
2	(Argentina) Leonel Maciel	36	57	159
2	(Spain) Gonzalo Pérez de Vargas	36	66	182
6	(Poland) Adam Morawski	35	56	158
6	(Russia) Stanislav Tretynko	35	21	60
8	(Argentina) Juan Bar	34	18	53
8	(Spain) Rodrigo Corrales	34	54	160
8	(Slovenia) Klemen Ferlin	34	44	131
8	(Iceland) Björgvin Páll Gústavsson	34	36	107
8	(Denmark) Kevin Møller	34	29	86
8	(Sweden) Andreas Palicka	34	72	213
8	(Norway) Kristian Sæverås	34	37	108

Source: IHF

== Broadcasters ==
Country	Channel
Algeria	EPTV (Algeria matches and final)
Austria	ORF
Belarus	Belarus 5
Bosnia and Herzegovina	Arena Sport
Chile	TNT Sports (Chile matches and final)
Croatia	RTL 2, RTL
Denmark	DR1 (TV & Radio), TV 2
Egypt and Middle East and North Africa	OnTime Sports (AR)
France	beIN Sports, TMC
France	RMC (Radio)
Germany	ARD
Germany	ZDF
Germany	Eurosport
Germany	Sportdeutschland.TV
Hungary	M4 Sport
Iceland	RÚV
Montenegro	Arena Sport
North Macedonia	MRT, Arena Sport
Norway	TV3/Viaplay
Poland	TVP
Romania	Digi Sport
Portugal	RTP (Radio)
Serbia	Arena Sport
Slovenia	Radiotelevizija Slovenija
Slovenia	Val 202 (Radio)
Spain	Teledeporte
Sweden	Nordic Entertainment Group
Sweden	Radiosporten (Radio)
Switzerland	TV24
United Arab Emirates	RMC Sport
United States	ESPN+
Countries without a license	YouTube (Telecom Egypt)
