= Humberto Gomes =

Portuguese handball player (born 1978)

Personal information
- Full name: Humberto Jorge Simões Dias Ramos Gomes
- Nationality: Portuguese
- Born: 1 January 1978 (age 48) Braga, Portugal
- Height: 1.93 m (6 ft 4 in)

Sport
- Sport: Handball
- Position: Goalkeeper
- Current club: Póvoa AC

Senior clubs
- Years: Team
- 1997–2002: ABC Braga
- 2002–2003: FC Gaia
- 2003–2004: São Bernardo
- 2004–2007: Belenenses
- 2007–2010: Sporting CP
- 2010–2020: ABC Braga
- 2020–2022: Póvoa AC
- 2022–...: ABC Braga
National team
Years	Team	Apps	(Gls)
–	Portugal	93	(0)
- Updated on 28 August 2022

Humberto Jorge Simões Dias Ramos Gomes (born 1 January 1978) is a Portuguese handball player for Póvoa AC and the Portuguese national team.

He represented Portugal at the 2020 European Men's Handball Championship. He had the best saves-to-shots ratio of any goalkeeper with at least 20% of total shots received by their team in 2021 World Men's Handball Championship where he stops 43% of shots.

== Career statistics ==
Season	Teams	Matches	Goals
2009-2010	Sporting	42	1
2010-2011	ABC Braga	39	0
2011-2012	ABC Braga	33	1
2012-2013	ABC Braga	35	1
2013-2014	ABC Braga	37	0
2014-2015	ABC Braga	42	0
2015-2016	ABC Braga	49	0
2016-2017	ABC Braga	54	3
2017-2018	ABC Braga	38	12
2018-2019	ABC Braga	41	6
2019-2020	ABC Braga	26	6
2020-2021	Póvoa	33	6
2021-2022	Póvoa	32	8
2022-2023	ABC Braga	...	...
