= Gauthier Mvumbi =

French handball player (born 1994)

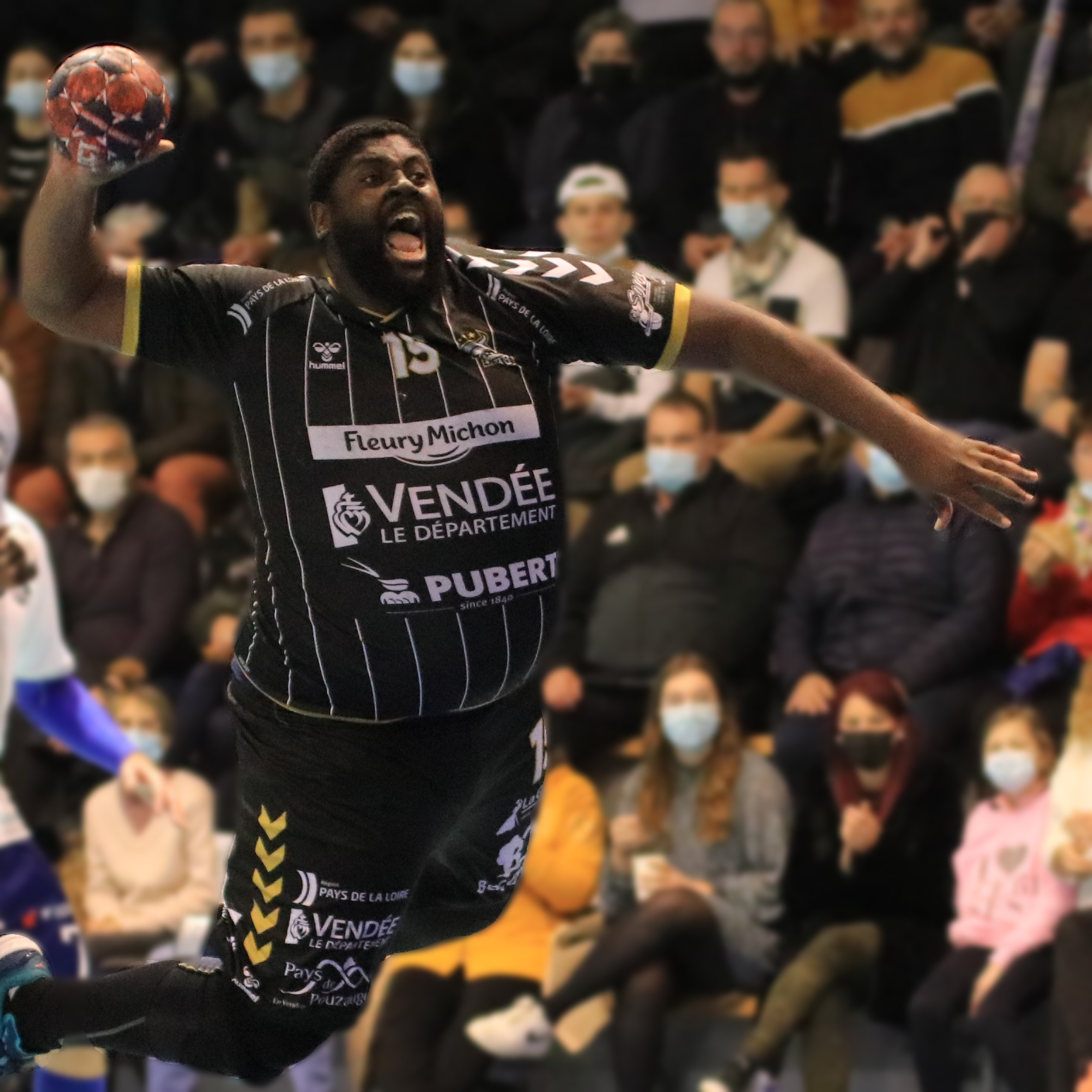
- Mvubi, Pouzauges Vendée Hand-Ball Season 2021-2022

Personal information
- Full name: Gauthier Thierry Mvumbi
- Born: 15 May 1994 (age 32) Dreux, France
- Height: 1.92 m (6 ft 4 in)

Sport
- Sport: Handball

Youth career
- Years: Team
- –: Caen HB
- –: Massy EH
- –: Savigny HB 91
- –: US Créteil HB

Senior clubs
- Years: Team
- 2013-2020: CO Vernouillet
- 2020-2021: Dreux AC
- 2021-2022: Savigny HB 91
- 2022-2023: Entente Territoire Charente HB
- 2022-2023: Rouen Handball
National team
Years	Team	Apps	(Gls)
2016-	DR Congo (2021)	7	(20)

Gauthier Thierry Mvumbi (born 15 May 1994) is a French handball player born to immigrants from the Democratic Republic of the Congo (DR Congo). He plays at the pivot position and represented the DR Congo on its men's national handball team during the 2021 World Men's Handball Championship. Due to his massive size and skill, he became a viral video sensation at the world championship, where he was referred to as the "Shaq of Handball" and the "Congo Colossus".

== Early years and size ==
Mvumbi was born in 1994 in Dreux, France. His parents emigrated from Kinshasa and settled in Dreux where Mvumbi grew up. He acquired French nationality on 22 December 2003, through the collective effect of his parents' naturalization. He began playing handball with friends in 2007. He was a basketball fan growing up, and he cited Michael Jordan, LeBron James, Kevin Durant, and Shaquille O'Neal as his idols. Asked what distinguishes him, Mvumbi pointed to "my physique and my efficiency ... My strengths are my strength and my speed for shorter distances."

Mvumbi is officially listed as being 1.92 meters (6.29 feet) tall and officially weighing 110 kilograms (242 pounds), though other sources indicate that his weight has been understated. Some reports placed his weight during the 2021 world championship at 137 kilos (302 pounds).

Prior to the 2021 world championship, Mvumbi played for Dreux AC in Nationale 2, a lower division of France's Ligue Nationale de Handball. Mvumbi previously played six seasons with Vernouillet in Nationale 1, but he returned to his hometown of Dreux in the summer of 2020, where he lived with his parents.

== 2021 World Championship ==
DR Congo qualified for the World Men's Handball Championship for the first time in 2021. Mvumbi was the team's breakout star, playing at midfield. He scored four goals against Argentina and another four goals against 2021 world champion Denmark, despite being double teamed. He totaled 20 goals on 23 finishes and was named the most valuable player in two of DR Congo's matches. His line play during the world championships was described "almost unstoppable". In a wave of notoriety resulting from his performance at the 2021 World Men's Handball Championship, he granted 30 interviews to news outlets around the world. His Instagram account grew from 225 subscribers to 27,000 during two weeks of competition at the national championship.

Due to his "massive appearance", he was compared during the world championship to basketball player, Shaquille O'Neal, and referred to as the "Shaq of handball". After DR Congo's match with Argentina, O'Neal posted a video greeting to Mvumbi on his Instagram account. The two spoke by phone during the national championship with O'Neal calling Mvumbi his little brother.

Mvumbi has also been referred to as the "Congo Colossus" and "El Gigante". In January 2021, Handball Planet called him "the most popular handball player on the Earth".

After the world championship, Mvumbi acknowledged that he had become a symbol of an athlete who proves it can be done despite being overweight. He noted that he received many touching messages from people who struggled with weight problems and tried to respond to each one.
