= Ludovic Fabregas =

French handball player (born 1996)

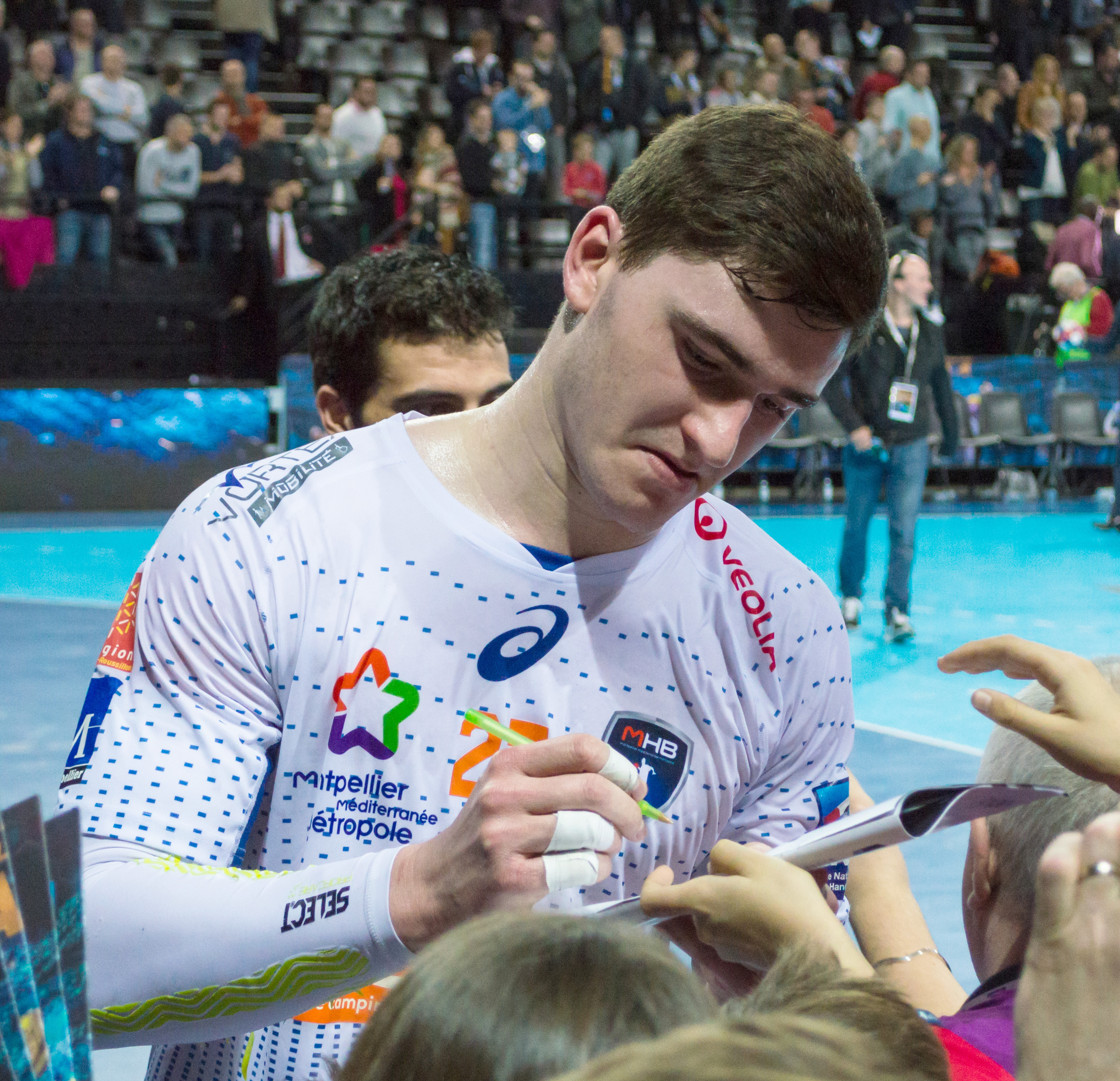
- Fabregas in 2016

Personal information
- Nationality: French
- Born: 1 July 1996 (age 30) Perpignan, France
- Height: 1.98 m (6 ft 6 in)

Sport
- Sport: Handball
- Position: Pivot
- Current club: FC Barcelona Handbol
- Number: 89

Youth career
- Years: Team
- 2004–2011: Banyuls HB
- 2011–2015: Montpellier Handball

Senior clubs
- Years: Team
- 2015–2018: Montpellier Handball
- 2018–2023: FC Barcelona
- 2023–2025: ONE Veszprém
- 2025–: FC Barcelona
National team
Years	Team	Apps	(Gls)
2015–	France	164	(412)
Medal record
Olympic Games
Gold medal – first place	2020 Tokyo	Team
Silver medal – second place	2016 Rio de Janeiro	Team
World Championship
Gold medal – first place	2017 France
Silver medal – second place	2023 Poland/Sweden
Bronze medal – third place	2019 Germany/Denmark
Bronze medal – third place	2025 Croatia/Denmark/Norway
European Championship
Gold medal – first place	2024 Germany
Bronze medal – third place	2018 Croatia
Youth World Championship
Gold medal – first place	2015 Russia
- Updated on 13 January 2026

Ludovic Fabregas (born 1 July 1996) is a French professional handball player for FC Barcelona and the French national team. He is widely considered one of the best players of his generation.

== Career ==
Fabregas started playing handball at Banyuls HB in 2004. In 2011, he joined the youth team of Montpellier Handball. Here he made his senior debut in the 2013-14 season. In 2015, he signed a professional contract with the club. With Montpellier, he won the 2016 French Cup. In 2018, he won the EHF Champions League and IHF Men's Super Globe.

He then joined Spanish top team FC Barcelona. Here, he won the Liga ASOBAL, Copa ASOBAL, Spanish Cup, and Supercup. In 2022, he once again won the Champions League. In the final he scored the deciding penalty to win the match.

In 2021, he was nominated to the best player in the world.

In 2023, he joined Hungarian Veszprém KC and in 2025 Spanish Barcelona (HC).

=== National team ===
Fabregas debuted for the French national team on 10 June 2015 against Czechia.

At the 2016 Olympics, he won silver medals with the French team. He won the 2017 World Championship. At the 2018 European Championship and 2019 World Championship, he won bronze medals at both occasions.

At the 2020 Olympics in Tokyo, he won gold medals. Here, he was included in the tournament All star team.

At the 2023 World Championship, he won silver medals with the French team, and was once again selected for the tournament all star team.

In 2024, he won the European Championship. He played all 9 games and scored 44 goals. At the 2025 World Championship, he won bronze medals with the French team. He played 8 games and scored 23 goals.

== Personal life ==
Born in France, Fabregas' parents were Catalonians who fled Spain to France under the Franco regime.

== Titles ==
=== Club ===
With Montpellier Handball

- French Men's Handball Cup: 2016
- French League Cup: 2016
- EHF Champions League: 2018

With FC Barcelona

- Liga ASOBAL: 2019, 2020, 2021, 2022, 2023, 2026
- Copa del Rey: 2019, 2020, 2021, 2022, 2023, 2026
- Spanish Supercup: 2018, 2019, 2020, 2021, 2022
- Supercopa Ibérica: 2022, 2025
- Catalan Supercup: 2018, 2019, 2020, 2021, 2022
- EHF Champions League: 2021, 2022, 2026
- IHF Men's Super Globe: 2018, 2019, 2025

With Veszprém KC

- Hungarian Championship: 2024, 2025
- Hungarian Cup: 2024
- IHF Men's Super Globe: 2024

=== National team ===
- U-18 European Championship: 2014
- U-19 World Championship: 2015
- Olympics: 2020
  - Silver: 2016
- World Championship:
  - Gold: 2017
  - Silver: 2023
  - Bronze: 2019, 2025
- European Championship
  - Gold: 2024
  - Bronze: 2018

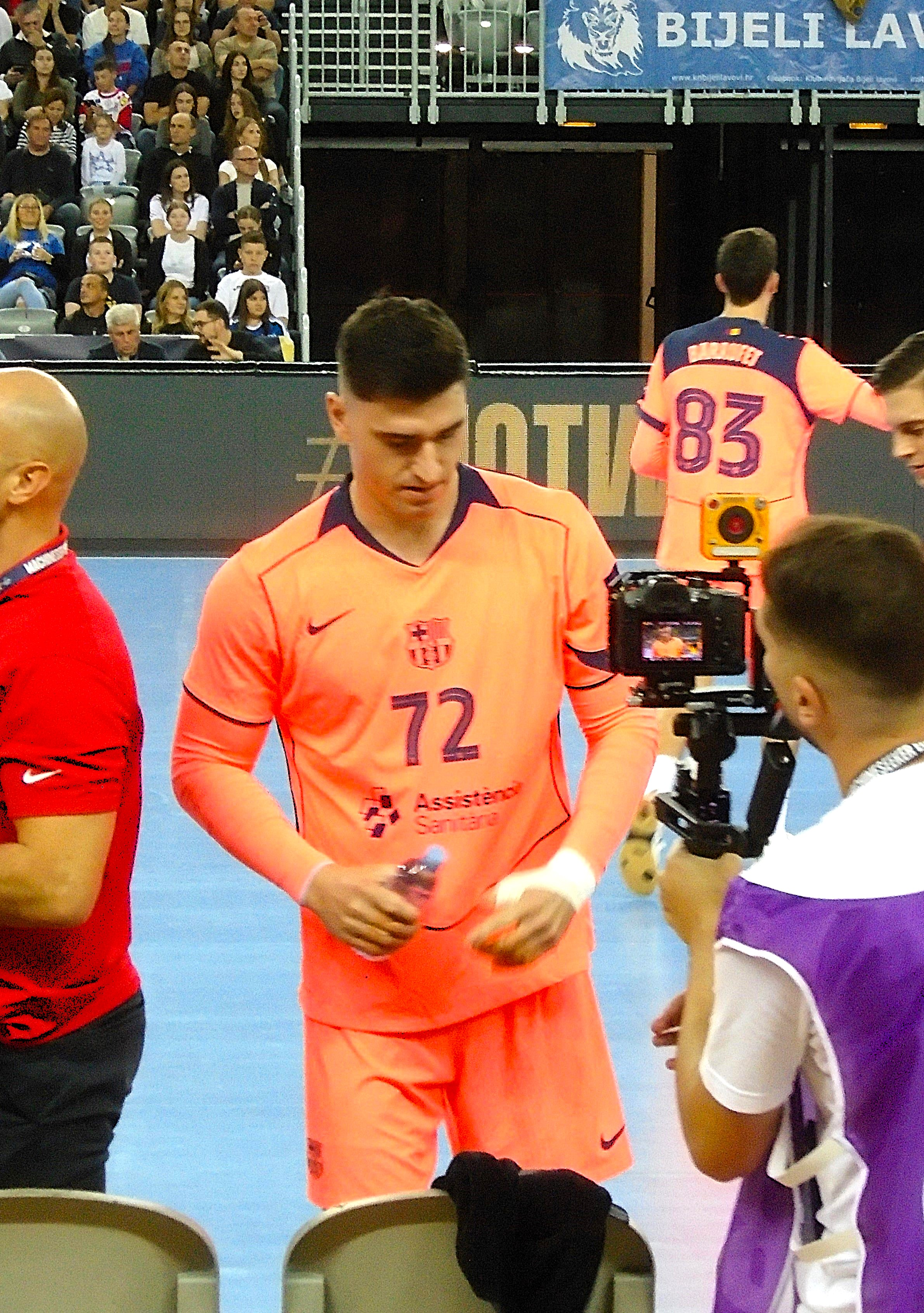
Fabregas at the match RK Zagreb - Barcelona in Zagreb Arena Sportshall, Croatia, on 25th September 2025

== Individual awards ==
- All-Star Pivot at the Olympic Games: 2020
- All-Star Pivot of the World Championship: 2021, 2023
- All-Star pivot of the European Championship: 2024
- All-Star Pivot of the Youth World Championship: 2015
- All-Star Pivot of EHF Champions League: 2021
- Best Young Player of EHF Champions League: 2019
- EHF Excellence Awards Best line player of the season: 2022/23, 2023/24, 2024/25
- EHF Excellence Awards Defender of the season: 2025/26
