= 2025 IHF Men's Club World Championship =

Club handball world championship

2025 IHF Men’s Club World Championship

Tournament details
- Host country: Egypt
- Venue: 1 (in 1 host city)
- Dates: 26 September – 2 October
- Teams: 9 (from 6 confederations)

Final positions
- Champions: (Spain) FC Barcelona (6th title)
- Runners-up: (Hungary) Telekom Veszprém
- Third place: (Germany) SC Magdeburg
- Fourth place: (Egypt) Al Ahly

Tournament statistics
- Matches played: 18
- Goals scored: 1,045 (58.06 per match)
- Attendance: 17,060 (948 per match)
- Top scorers: Hugo Descat (28 goals)

Awards
- Best player: Rodrigo Corrales

‌The 2025 IHF Men's Club World Championship was the 18th edition of the yearly club world championship in handball, held from 26 September to 2 October 2025 in New Administrative Capital, Egypt under the aegis of the International Handball Federation (IHF).

FC Barcelona won their sixth title after a win over Telekom Veszprém.

== Host ==
The Egyptian Handball Federation received a contract for three editions, starting in 2024. The tournament was held in the New Capital Sports Hall in New Administrative Capital.

== Teams ==
Nine teams competed in the tournament: the winners of the continental tournaments, the defending champion, a host teams and a wild card team.

Team	Qualified as
(Hungary) Telekom Veszprém	Defending champion
(Egypt) Al Ahly	Winner of African Handball Super Cup
(United Arab Emirates) Sharjah HC	Winner of Asian Club League Championship
(Australia) Sydney University	Winner of Oceania Handball Champions Cup
(United States) California Eagles	Winner of North American and Caribbean Senior Club Championship
(Brazil) Handebol Taubaté	Winner of South and Central American Men's Club Handball Championship
(Germany) SC Magdeburg	Winner of EHF Champions League
(Egypt) Zamalek	Host
(Spain) FC Barcelona	Wildcard

== Draw ==
The draw was held on 11 August 2025.

=== Seeding ===
Pot 1	Pot 2	Pot 3
(Egypt) Al Ahly (United Arab Emirates) Sharjah HC (Egypt) Zamalek	(Hungary) Telekom Veszprém (Germany) SC Magdeburg (Spain) FC Barcelona	(Australia) Sydney University (Brazil) Handebol Taubaté (United States) California Eagles

== Referees ==
The referee pairs were announced on 20 August 2025.

Referees
Czech Republic	Václav Horáček; Jiří Novotný
Denmark	Josefine Jensen; Cristina Lovin
Egypt	Alaa Emam; Hossam Hedaia
Germany	Robert Schulze; Tobias Tönnies

Referees
Norway	Håvard Kleven; Lars Jørum
Slovenia	Bojan Lah; David Sok
Serbia	Marko Sekulić; Vladimir Jovandić

== Preliminary round ==
All times are local (UTC+3).

=== Group A ===
Pos	Team	Pld	W	D	L	GF	GA	GD	Pts	Qualification
1	(Germany) SC Magdeburg	2	2	0	0	86	46	+40	4	Semifinals
2	(United Arab Emirates) Sharjah HC	2	1	0	1	61	66	−5	2	
3	(United States) California Eagles	2	0	0	2	50	85	−35	0	

Source: IHF
Rules for classification: 1) points; 2) head-to-head points; 3) head-to-head goal difference; 4) head-to-head number of goals scored; 5) goal difference.

26 September 2025; 15:30	Sharjah HC (United Arab Emirates)	35–30	(United States) California Eagles	New Capital Sports Hall, New Administrative Capital; Attendance: 200; Referees: Kleven, Jørum (NOR)
26 September 2025; 15:30	Al-Maazmi, Ayari 8	(18–15)	Akuro 10	New Capital Sports Hall, New Administrative Capital; Attendance: 200; Referees: Kleven, Jørum (NOR)
26 September 2025; 15:30	1× (suspension)	Report	2× (suspension)	New Capital Sports Hall, New Administrative Capital; Attendance: 200; Referees: Kleven, Jørum (NOR)

27 September 2025; 15:30	California Eagles (United States)	20–50	(Germany) SC Magdeburg	New Capital Sports Hall, New Administrative Capital; Attendance: 120; Referees: Emam, Hedaia (EGY)
27 September 2025; 15:30	Vejar 5	(10–28)	Mertens 11	New Capital Sports Hall, New Administrative Capital; Attendance: 120; Referees: Emam, Hedaia (EGY)
27 September 2025; 15:30	2× (suspension)	Report	3× (suspension)	New Capital Sports Hall, New Administrative Capital; Attendance: 120; Referees: Emam, Hedaia (EGY)

28 September 2025; 15:30	SC Magdeburg (Germany)	36–26	(United Arab Emirates) Sharjah HC	New Capital Sports Hall, New Administrative Capital; Attendance: 250; Referees: Sekulić, Jovandić (SRB)
28 September 2025; 15:30	Pettersson 7	(16–13)	Radwan 11	New Capital Sports Hall, New Administrative Capital; Attendance: 250; Referees: Sekulić, Jovandić (SRB)
28 September 2025; 15:30	2× (yellow card) 1× (suspension)	Report	3× (suspension)	New Capital Sports Hall, New Administrative Capital; Attendance: 250; Referees: Sekulić, Jovandić (SRB)

=== Group B ===
Pos	Team	Pld	W	D	L	GF	GA	GD	Pts	Qualification
1	(Hungary) Telekom Veszprém	2	2	0	0	82	37	+45	4	Semifinals
2	(Egypt) Al Ahly	2	1	0	1	63	45	+18	2	Semifinals
3	(Australia) Sydney Uni HC	2	0	0	2	29	92	−63	0	

Source: IHF
Rules for classification: 1) points; 2) head-to-head points; 3) head-to-head goal difference; 4) head-to-head number of goals scored; 5) goal difference.

26 September 2025; 20:30	Al Ahly (Egypt)	41–14	(Australia) Sydney Uni HC	New Capital Sports Hall, New Administrative Capital; Attendance: 1,000; Referees: Schulze, Tönnies (GER)
26 September 2025; 20:30	Hassan 12	(20–6)	Messerschmidt 3	New Capital Sports Hall, New Administrative Capital; Attendance: 1,000; Referees: Schulze, Tönnies (GER)
26 September 2025; 20:30	1× (yellow card) 1× (suspension)	Report	2× (suspension)	New Capital Sports Hall, New Administrative Capital; Attendance: 1,000; Referees: Schulze, Tönnies (GER)

27 September 2025; 20:00	Sydney Uni HC (Australia)	15–51	(Hungary) Telekom Veszprém	New Capital Sports Hall, New Administrative Capital; Attendance: 100; Referees: Ismoilov, Ismoilov (UZB)
27 September 2025; 20:00	Cherif, Delpire 4	(10–27)	Descat 9	New Capital Sports Hall, New Administrative Capital; Attendance: 100; Referees: Ismoilov, Ismoilov (UZB)
27 September 2025; 20:00	3× (suspension)	Report	3× (suspension)	New Capital Sports Hall, New Administrative Capital; Attendance: 100; Referees: Ismoilov, Ismoilov (UZB)

28 September 2025; 20:00	Telekom Veszprém (Hungary)	31–22	(Egypt) Al Ahly	New Capital Sports Hall, New Administrative Capital; Attendance: 5,000; Referees: Lah, Sok (SLO)
28 September 2025; 20:00	Descat 9	(13–12)	Saifeldeen, Sherif 5	New Capital Sports Hall, New Administrative Capital; Attendance: 5,000; Referees: Lah, Sok (SLO)
28 September 2025; 20:00	1× (yellow card) 3× (suspension)	Report	4× (suspension)	New Capital Sports Hall, New Administrative Capital; Attendance: 5,000; Referees: Lah, Sok (SLO)

=== Group C ===
Pos	Team	Pld	W	D	L	GF	GA	GD	Pts	Qualification
1	(Spain) Barcelona	2	2	0	0	88	47	+41	4	Semifinals
2	(Egypt) Zamalek SC	2	1	0	1	51	71	−20	2	
3	(Brazil) Handebol Taubaté	2	0	0	2	46	67	−21	0	

Source: IHF
Rules for classification: 1) points; 2) head-to-head points; 3) head-to-head goal difference; 4) head-to-head number of goals scored; 5) goal difference.

26 September 2025; 17:45	Zamalek SC (Egypt)	26–24	(Brazil) Handebol Taubaté	New Capital Sports Hall, New Administrative Capital; Attendance: 1,000; Referees: Lah, Sok (SLO)
26 September 2025; 17:45	El-Ahmar, Salah 5	(13–11)	Dos Santos 5	New Capital Sports Hall, New Administrative Capital; Attendance: 1,000; Referees: Lah, Sok (SLO)
26 September 2025; 17:45	1× (yellow card) 2× (suspension)	Report	1× (yellow card) 5× (suspension)	New Capital Sports Hall, New Administrative Capital; Attendance: 1,000; Referees: Lah, Sok (SLO)

27 September 2025; 17:45	Handebol Taubaté (Brazil)	22–41	(Spain) Barcelona	New Capital Sports Hall, New Administrative Capital; Attendance: 120; Referees: Horáček, Novotný (CZE)
27 September 2025; 17:45	Andrade, Dos Santos 4	(11–20)	Barrufet 13	New Capital Sports Hall, New Administrative Capital; Attendance: 120; Referees: Horáček, Novotný (CZE)
27 September 2025; 17:45	1× (yellow card) 5× (suspension)	Report	1× (suspension)	New Capital Sports Hall, New Administrative Capital; Attendance: 120; Referees: Horáček, Novotný (CZE)

28 September 2025; 17:45	Barcelona (Spain)	47–25	(Egypt) Zamalek SC	New Capital Sports Hall, New Administrative Capital; Attendance: 1,150; Referees: Kleven, Jørum (NOR)
28 September 2025; 17:45	Fernández 16	(24–12)	Salah 7	New Capital Sports Hall, New Administrative Capital; Attendance: 1,150; Referees: Kleven, Jørum (NOR)
28 September 2025; 17:45	2× (suspension)	Report	3× (suspension)	New Capital Sports Hall, New Administrative Capital; Attendance: 1,150; Referees: Kleven, Jørum (NOR)

=== Second-placed teams ranking ===
Pos	Grp	Team	Pld	W	D	L	GF	GA	GD	Pts	Qualification
1	B	(Egypt) Al Ahly	2	1	0	1	63	45	+18	2	Semifinals
2	A	(United Arab Emirates) Sharjah HC	2	1	0	1	61	66	−5	2	
3	C	(Egypt) Zamalek SC	2	1	0	1	51	71	−20	2	

Source: IHF
Rules for classification: 1) points; 2) goal difference.

== Classification round ==
=== Seventh to Ninth place ranking ===
Pos	Team	Pld	W	D	L	GF	GA	GD	Pts
1	(Brazil) Handebol Taubaté	2	2	0	0	70	46	+24	4
2	(United States) California Eagles	2	1	0	1	56	60	−4	2
3	(Australia) Sydney Uni HC	2	0	0	2	46	66	−20	0

Source: IHF
Rules for classification: 1) points; 2) goal difference.

30 September 2025; 12:45	Handebol Taubaté (Brazil)	35–21	(Australia) Sydney Uni HC	New Capital Sports Hall, New Administrative Capital; Attendance: 100; Referees: Emam, Hedaia (EGY)
30 September 2025; 12:45	Andrade 10	(18–10)	Carriere, Gregorio 4	New Capital Sports Hall, New Administrative Capital; Attendance: 100; Referees: Emam, Hedaia (EGY)
30 September 2025; 12:45	1× (yellow card) 8× (suspension)	Report	1× (yellow card) 3× (suspension)	New Capital Sports Hall, New Administrative Capital; Attendance: 100; Referees: Emam, Hedaia (EGY)

1 October 2025; 16:00	California Eagles (United States)	31–25	(Australia) Sydney Uni HC	New Capital Sports Hall, New Administrative Capital; Attendance: 100; Referees: Ismoilov, Ismoilov (UZB)
1 October 2025; 16:00	Johannessen 7	(13–12)	Cherif 7	New Capital Sports Hall, New Administrative Capital; Attendance: 100; Referees: Ismoilov, Ismoilov (UZB)
1 October 2025; 16:00	2× (suspension)	Report	3× (suspension)	New Capital Sports Hall, New Administrative Capital; Attendance: 100; Referees: Ismoilov, Ismoilov (UZB)

2 October 2025; 12:30	Handebol Taubaté (Brazil)	35–25	(United States) California Eagles	New Capital Sports Hall, New Administrative Capital; Attendance: 100; Referees: Sekulić, Jovandić (SRB)
2 October 2025; 12:30	Laranjeiro 8	(18–13)	Corning 7	New Capital Sports Hall, New Administrative Capital; Attendance: 100; Referees: Sekulić, Jovandić (SRB)
2 October 2025; 12:30		Report	1× (yellow card) 2× (suspension)	New Capital Sports Hall, New Administrative Capital; Attendance: 100; Referees: Sekulić, Jovandić (SRB)

=== Fifth place game ===
30 September 2025; 15:00	Sharjah HC (United Arab Emirates)	26–29	(Egypt) Zamalek	New Capital Sports Hall, New Administrative Capital; Attendance: 220; Referees: Schulze, Tönnies (GER)
30 September 2025; 15:00	Radwan 8	(14–14)	Hashad 7	New Capital Sports Hall, New Administrative Capital; Attendance: 220; Referees: Schulze, Tönnies (GER)
30 September 2025; 15:00	1× (yellow card) 2× (suspension)	Report	2× (suspension) 1× (red card)	New Capital Sports Hall, New Administrative Capital; Attendance: 220; Referees: Schulze, Tönnies (GER)

2 October 2025; 14:45	Zamalek (Egypt)	28–28	(United Arab Emirates) Sharjah HC	New Capital Sports Hall, New Administrative Capital; Attendance: 200; Referees: Lah, Sok (SLO)
2 October 2025; 14:45	Yousri 7	(18–12)	Ayari 6	New Capital Sports Hall, New Administrative Capital; Attendance: 200; Referees: Lah, Sok (SLO)
2 October 2025; 14:45	4× (suspension)	Report	1× (yellow card) 2× (suspension)	New Capital Sports Hall, New Administrative Capital; Attendance: 200; Referees: Lah, Sok (SLO)

Zamalek won 57–54 on aggregate.

== Knockout stage ==
=== Bracket ===
Semi-finals
30 September
(Hungary) Telekom Veszprém	23
(Germany) SC Magdeburg	20
30 September
(Spain) FC Barcelona	26
(Egypt) Al Ahly	21

Final
2 October
(Hungary) Telekom Veszprém	30
(Spain) FC Barcelona (ET)	31
Third place
2 October
(Germany) SC Magdeburg	32
(Egypt) Al Ahly	23

=== Semifinals ===
30 September 2025; 17:15	Telekom Veszprém (Hungary)	23–20	(Germany) SC Magdeburg	New Capital Sports Hall, New Administrative Capital; Attendance: 600; Referees: Horáček, Novotný (CZE)
30 September 2025; 17:15	Mesilhy, Zein 5	(9–11)	Hornke 5	New Capital Sports Hall, New Administrative Capital; Attendance: 600; Referees: Horáček, Novotný (CZE)
30 September 2025; 17:15	1× (yellow card) 4× (suspension)	Report	1× (yellow card) 2× (suspension)	New Capital Sports Hall, New Administrative Capital; Attendance: 600; Referees: Horáček, Novotný (CZE)

30 September 2025; 20:00	FC Barcelona (Spain)	26–21	(Egypt) Al Ahly	New Capital Sports Hall, New Administrative Capital; Attendance: 2,000; Referees: Sekulić, Jovandić (SRB)
30 September 2025; 20:00	N’Guessan 7	(14–8)	Saifeldeen 4	New Capital Sports Hall, New Administrative Capital; Attendance: 2,000; Referees: Sekulić, Jovandić (SRB)
30 September 2025; 20:00	4× (suspension)	Report	1× (yellow card) 5× (suspension)	New Capital Sports Hall, New Administrative Capital; Attendance: 2,000; Referees: Sekulić, Jovandić (SRB)

=== Third place game ===
2 October 2025; 17:15	SC Magdeburg (Germany)	32–23	(Egypt) Al Ahly	New Capital Sports Hall, New Administrative Capital; Attendance: 800; Referees: Kleven, Jørum (NOR)
2 October 2025; 17:15	Saugstrup 7	(19–11)	Hany, Hesham 4	New Capital Sports Hall, New Administrative Capital; Attendance: 800; Referees: Kleven, Jørum (NOR)
2 October 2025; 17:15	2× (yellow card) 2× (suspension)	Report	4× (suspension) 1× (red card)	New Capital Sports Hall, New Administrative Capital; Attendance: 800; Referees: Kleven, Jørum (NOR)

=== Final ===
2 October 2025
20:00
Telekom Veszprém (Hungary)
30–31 (ET)
(Spain) FC Barcelona
New Capital Sports Hall, New Administrative Capital
Attendance: 4,000
Referees: Schulze, Tönnies (GER)
Descat 8
(12–13)
Gómez 6
2× (yellow card) 3× (suspension)
Report
2× (yellow card) 1× (suspension)

FT: 21–21 ET: 5–5, 4–5

== Final ranking ==
Rank	Team
1st place, gold medalist(s)	(Spain) FC Barcelona
2nd place, silver medalist(s)	(Hungary) Telekom Veszprém
3rd place, bronze medalist(s)	(Germany) SC Magdeburg
4	(Egypt) Al Ahly
5	(Egypt) Zamalek
6	(United Arab Emirates) Sharjah HC
7	(Brazil) Handebol Taubaté
8	(United States) California Eagles
9	(Australia) Sydney Uni HC

== All-Star Team ==
The All-Star Team was announced on 2 October 2025.

Position	Player	Club
Goalkeeper	(Denmark) Emil Nielsen	FC Barcelona
Right wing	(Spain) Aleix Gómez	FC Barcelona
Right back	(Croatia) Ivan Martinović	Telekom Veszprém
Centre back	(Iceland) Gísli Þorgeir Kristjánsson	SC Magdeburg
Left back	(France) Timothey N'Guessan	FC Barcelona
Left wing	(France) Hugo Descat	Telekom Veszprém
Pivot	(Denmark) Magnus Saugstrup	SC Magdeburg
MVP	(Spain) Rodrigo Corrales	Telekom Veszprém
