= New Capital Sports Hall =

Indoor hall for sports and Olympics

Sports City Indoor Hall
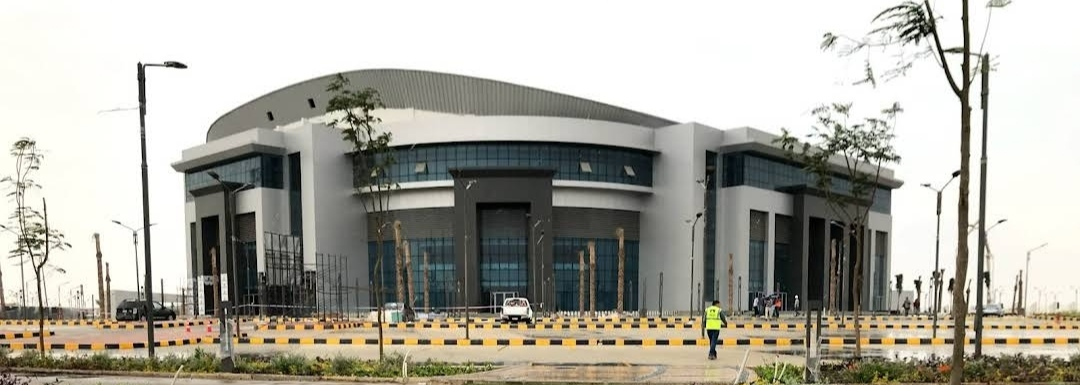
- Interactive map of Sports City Indoor Hall
- Location: New Administrative Capital, Egypt
- Coordinates: 30.042405°N 31.688407°E
- Capacity: 7,500

Construction
- Built: 2020
- Opened: 2021
- Cost: £E2.2 billion ($~137 million)
- Main contractors: Egyptian Ministry of Youth and Sports

New Capital Sports City Hall is an indoor hall located in the sports city of the New Administrative Capital of Egypt, with a capacity of 7,500 people. It was one of the venues that hosted 2021 World Men's Handball Championship, that was hosted in Egypt.

== See also ==
- List of indoor arenas in Egypt
