= Hugo Descat =

French handballer (born 1992)

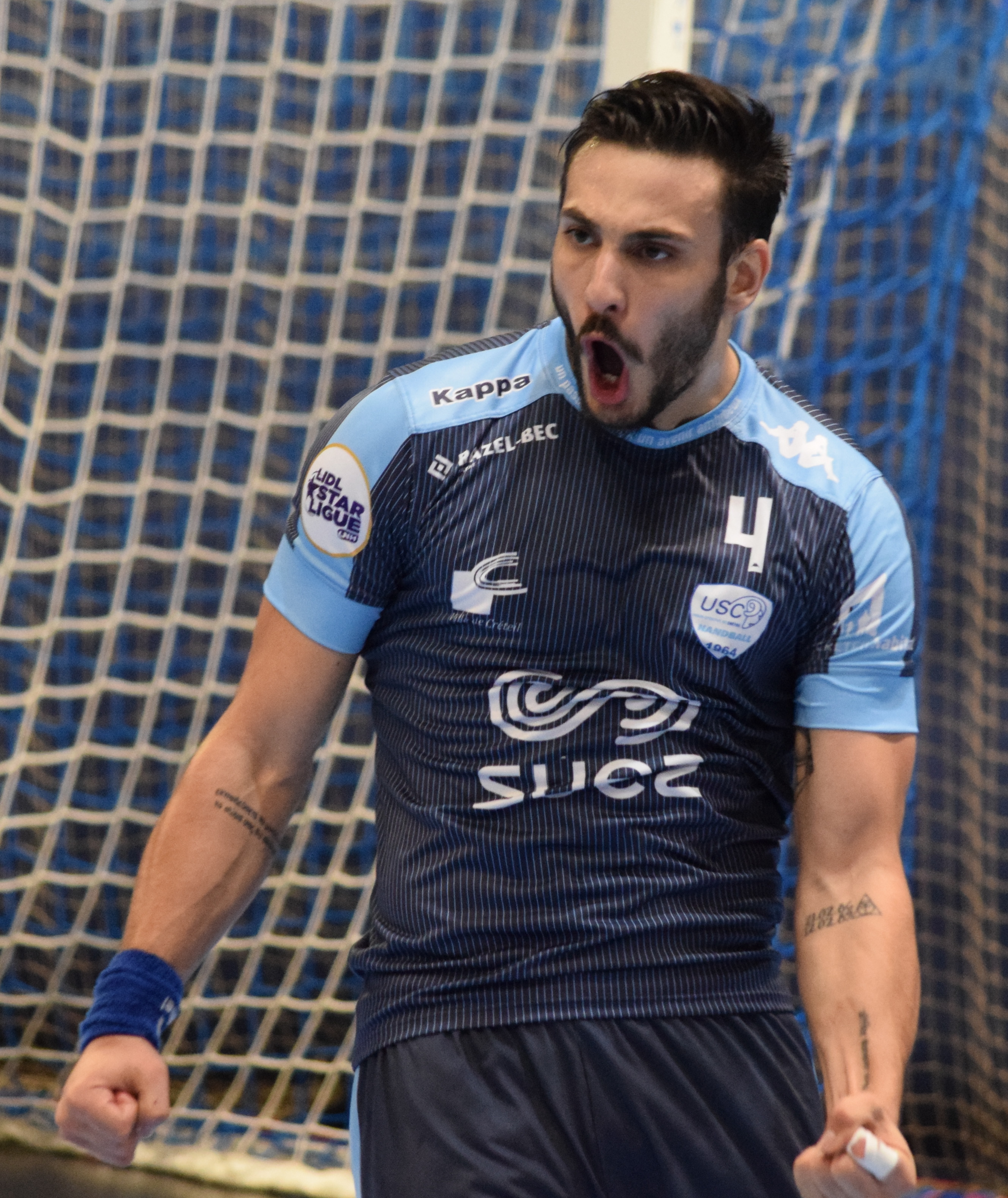
- Descat in 2017

Personal information
- Full name: Hugo Descat
- Nationality: French
- Born: 16 August 1992 (age 34) Paris, France
- Height: 1.82 m (6 ft 0 in)

Sport
- Sport: Handball
- Position: Left wing
- Current club: ONE Veszprém
- Number: 9

Senior clubs
- Years: Team
- 2011–2017: US Créteil Handball
- 2017–2019: Dinamo București
- 2019–2023: Montpellier Handball
- 2023–: ONE Veszprém
National team
Years	Team	Apps	(Gls)
2013–	France	71	(311)
Medal record
Olympic Games
Gold medal – first place	2020 Tokyo	Team
European Championship
Gold medal – first place	2024 Germany
- Updated on 14 January 2026

Hugo Descat (born 16 August 1992) is a French handball player for ONE Veszprém and the French national team.

Descat was the second best scorer in the 2016–17 season of the Championnat de France, third in 2013, fourth in 2012 and fifth in 2015. He was also the second best scorer of the 2011 Youth World Championship.

== International honours ==
- Junior World Championship:
  - Bronze Medalist: 2013

== Individual awards ==
- All-Star Left Wing at the 2020 Olympics
- All-Star Left Wing of the Youth World Championship: 2011
- Championnat de France Best Young Player Award: 2012
