= 2009 Men's Junior World Handball Championship =

2009 Junior World Championship

Tournament details
- Host country: Egypt
- Venues: 5 (in 3 host cities)
- Dates: August 5–19
- Teams: 24 (from 4 confederations)

Final positions
- Champions: Germany (1st title)
- Runners-up: Denmark
- Third place: Slovenia
- Fourth place: Egypt

Tournament statistics
- Matches played: 98
- Goals scored: 5,707 (58.23 per match)
- Top scorer: (Estonia) Mait Patrail (81)

The 2009 Men's Junior World Handball Championship (17th tournament) took place in Egypt from August 5–19.

== Preliminary round ==
=== Group A ===
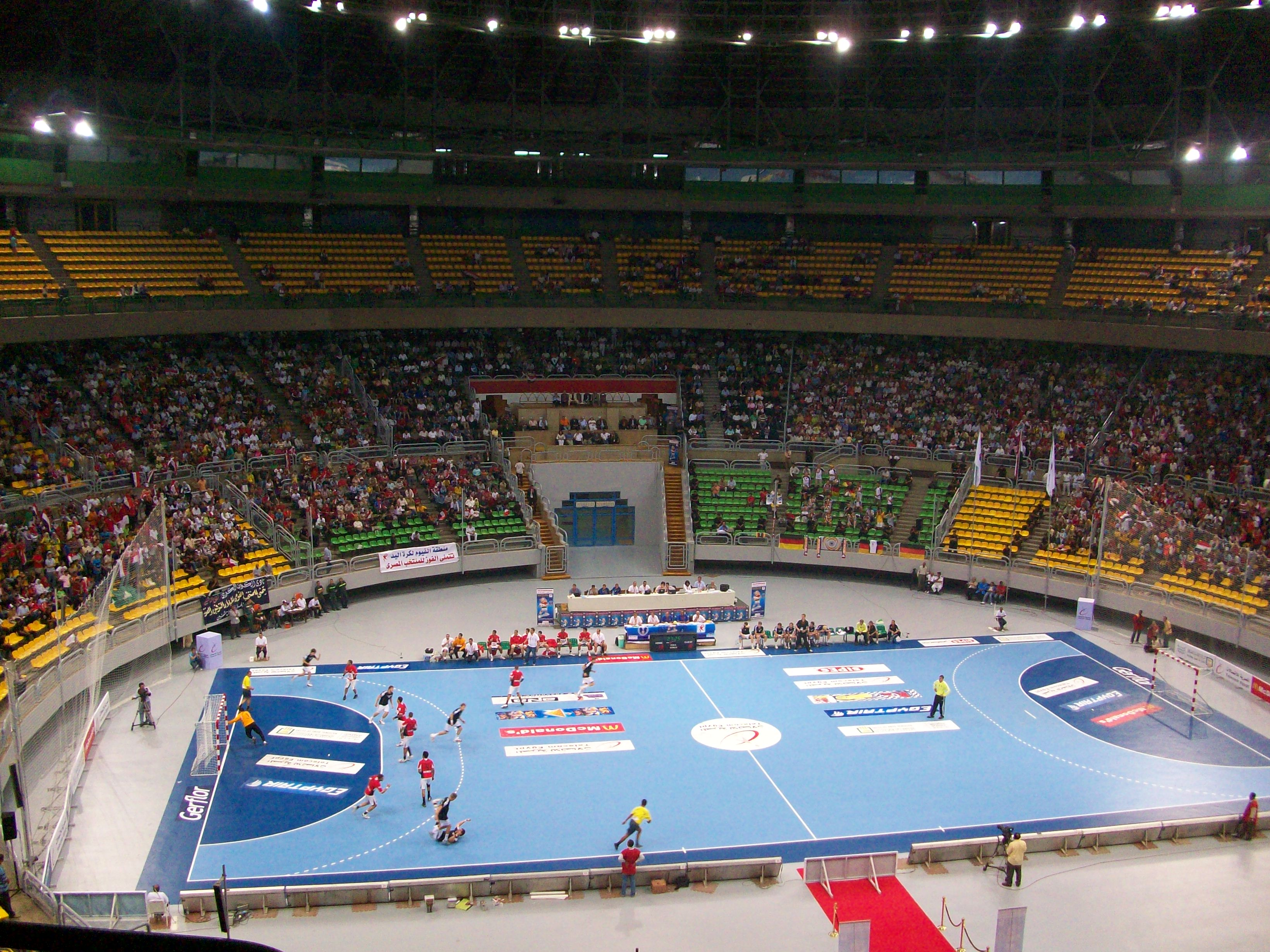
Egypt vs Germany. Cairo Stadium Hall 1. August 11

Team	Pld	W	D	L	GF	GA	GD	Pts
Germany	5	4	0	1	161	125	+36	8 (Note: Tiebreaker: 2 PTS)
Egypt	5	4	0	1	135	115	+20	8 (Note: Tiebreaker: 0 PTS)
Argentina	5	3	0	2	128	114	+14	6
Iceland	5	2	0	3	134	137	−3	4
Qatar	5	1	0	4	124	165	−41	2
Kuwait	5	1	0	4	138	164	−26	2

Notes:

August 5; 20:30	Egypt	25 – 19	Iceland	Cairo Stadium Hall 1, Cairo; Referees: Nikolić, Stojković (SRB)
August 5; 20:30	Hashem 8	(13–8)	Kárason, Grétarsson 4	Cairo Stadium Hall 1, Cairo; Referees: Nikolić, Stojković (SRB)
August 5; 20:30	3× (yellow card) 3× (suspension)	Report	3× (yellow card) 5× (suspension)	Cairo Stadium Hall 1, Cairo; Referees: Nikolić, Stojković (SRB)

August 6; 17:30	Germany	24 – 25	Argentina	Cairo Stadium Hall 1, Cairo; Referees: Gubica, Milošević (CRO)
August 6; 17:30	Coßbau 6	(11–16)	Simonet 8	Cairo Stadium Hall 1, Cairo; Referees: Gubica, Milošević (CRO)
August 6; 17:30	3× (yellow card) 7× (suspension) 1× (red card)	Report	3× (yellow card) 5× (suspension)	Cairo Stadium Hall 1, Cairo; Referees: Gubica, Milošević (CRO)

August 6; 19:30	Kuwait	31 – 34	Qatar	Cairo Stadium Hall 1, Cairo; Referees: Johansson, Kliko (SWE)
August 6; 19:30	M. Al-Gharaballi 12	(14–14)	Kenaoui 11	Cairo Stadium Hall 1, Cairo; Referees: Johansson, Kliko (SWE)
August 6; 19:30	3× (yellow card) 9× (suspension) 1× (red card)	Report	3× (yellow card) 6× (suspension) 1× (red card)	Cairo Stadium Hall 1, Cairo; Referees: Johansson, Kliko (SWE)

August 7; 16:30	Qatar	23 – 37	Germany	Cairo Stadium Hall 1, Cairo; Referees: Coulibaly, Diabaté (CIV)
August 7; 16:30	Madadi 5	(10–20)	Groetzki 8	Cairo Stadium Hall 1, Cairo; Referees: Coulibaly, Diabaté (CIV)
August 7; 16:30	2× (yellow card) 2× (suspension)	Report	2× (yellow card) 5× (suspension)	Cairo Stadium Hall 1, Cairo; Referees: Coulibaly, Diabaté (CIV)

August 7; 18:30	Iceland	34 – 32	Kuwait	Cairo Stadium Hall 1, Cairo; Referees: Baranowski, Lemanowicz (POL)
August 7; 18:30	Kárason 7	(14–17)	M. Al-Gharaballi 8	Cairo Stadium Hall 1, Cairo; Referees: Baranowski, Lemanowicz (POL)
August 7; 18:30	3× (yellow card) 2× (suspension)	Report	3× (yellow card) 5× (suspension)	Cairo Stadium Hall 1, Cairo; Referees: Baranowski, Lemanowicz (POL)

August 7; 20:30	Argentina	20 – 21	Egypt	Cairo Stadium Hall 1, Cairo; Referees: Johansson, Kliko (SWE)
August 7; 20:30	Vieyra 6	(9–9)	Ibrahim 6	Cairo Stadium Hall 1, Cairo; Referees: Johansson, Kliko (SWE)
August 7; 20:30	3× (yellow card) 8× (suspension)	Report	3× (yellow card) 11× (suspension) 1× (red card)	Cairo Stadium Hall 1, Cairo; Referees: Johansson, Kliko (SWE)

August 8; 16:30	Germany	32 – 23	Iceland	Cairo Stadium Hall 1, Cairo; Referees: Johansson, Kliko (SWE)
August 8; 16:30	Coßbau 5	(17–12)	Kárason, Gústafsson 5	Cairo Stadium Hall 1, Cairo; Referees: Johansson, Kliko (SWE)
August 8; 16:30	3× (yellow card) 2× (suspension)	Report	3× (yellow card) 4× (suspension) 1× (red card)	Cairo Stadium Hall 1, Cairo; Referees: Johansson, Kliko (SWE)

August 8; 18:30	Argentina	33 – 20	Qatar	Cairo Stadium Hall 1, Cairo; Referees: Baranowski, Lemanowicz (POL)
August 8; 18:30	Vieyra 8	(14–10)	Mohamed 9	Cairo Stadium Hall 1, Cairo; Referees: Baranowski, Lemanowicz (POL)
August 8; 18:30	3× (yellow card) 2× (suspension)	Report	3× (yellow card) 6× (suspension)	Cairo Stadium Hall 1, Cairo; Referees: Baranowski, Lemanowicz (POL)

August 8; 20:30	Egypt	32 – 23	Kuwait	Cairo Stadium Hall 1, Cairo; Referees: Gubica, Milošević (CRO)
August 8; 20:30	Yousef 7	(15–11)	M. Al-Gharaballi, A. Al-Gharaballi 5	Cairo Stadium Hall 1, Cairo; Referees: Gubica, Milošević (CRO)
August 8; 20:30	3× (yellow card) 5× (suspension)	Report	3× (yellow card) 9× (suspension) 1× (red card)	Cairo Stadium Hall 1, Cairo; Referees: Gubica, Milošević (CRO)

August 10; 16:30	Kuwait	26 – 39	Germany	Cairo Stadium Hall 1, Cairo; Referees: Coulibaly, Diabaté (CIV)
August 10; 16:30	M. Al-Gharaballi 6	(12–21)	Coßbau 6	Cairo Stadium Hall 1, Cairo; Referees: Coulibaly, Diabaté (CIV)
August 10; 16:30	3× (yellow card) 1× (suspension)	Report	3× (yellow card) 2× (suspension)	Cairo Stadium Hall 1, Cairo; Referees: Coulibaly, Diabaté (CIV)

August 10; 18:30	Iceland	23 – 25	Argentina	Cairo Stadium Hall 1, Cairo; Referees: Gubica, Milošević (CRO)
August 10; 18:30	Kárason, Friðriksson 5	(12–13)	Vieyra 7	Cairo Stadium Hall 1, Cairo; Referees: Gubica, Milošević (CRO)
August 10; 18:30	3× (yellow card) 7× (suspension)	Report	3× (yellow card) 4× (suspension)	Cairo Stadium Hall 1, Cairo; Referees: Gubica, Milošević (CRO)

August 10; 20:30	Egypt	29 – 24	Qatar	Cairo Stadium Hall 1, Cairo; Referees: Nikolić, Stojković (SRB)
August 10; 20:30	Hashem 8	(15–14)	Mohamed 9	Cairo Stadium Hall 1, Cairo; Referees: Nikolić, Stojković (SRB)
August 10; 20:30	3× (yellow card) 6× (suspension)	Report	3× (yellow card) 2× (suspension)	Cairo Stadium Hall 1, Cairo; Referees: Nikolić, Stojković (SRB)

August 11; 16:30	Qatar	23 – 35	Iceland	Cairo Stadium Hall 1, Cairo; Referees: Coulibaly (CIV), Gubica (CRO)
August 11; 16:30	Abdulwahed 6	(12–19)	Gústafsson 9	Cairo Stadium Hall 1, Cairo; Referees: Coulibaly (CIV), Gubica (CRO)
August 11; 16:30	3× (yellow card) 4× (suspension) 1× (red card)	Report	3× (yellow card) 7× (suspension)	Cairo Stadium Hall 1, Cairo; Referees: Coulibaly (CIV), Gubica (CRO)

August 11; 18:30	Kuwait	26 – 25	Argentina	Cairo Stadium Hall 1, Cairo; Referees: Diabaté (CIV), Milošević (CRO)
August 11; 18:30	M. Al-Gharaballi 9	(12–10)	Fernández 6	Cairo Stadium Hall 1, Cairo; Referees: Diabaté (CIV), Milošević (CRO)
August 11; 18:30	3× (yellow card) 2× (suspension)	Report	3× (yellow card) 3× (suspension)	Cairo Stadium Hall 1, Cairo; Referees: Diabaté (CIV), Milošević (CRO)

August 11; 20:30	Germany	29 – 28	Egypt	Cairo Stadium Hall 1, Cairo; Referees: Baranowski, Lemanowicz (POL)
August 11; 20:30	Groetzki 12	(13–11)	Shebib 8	Cairo Stadium Hall 1, Cairo; Referees: Baranowski, Lemanowicz (POL)
August 11; 20:30	3× (yellow card) 3× (suspension)	Report	3× (yellow card) 6× (suspension)	Cairo Stadium Hall 1, Cairo; Referees: Baranowski, Lemanowicz (POL)

=== Group B ===
Team	Pld	W	D	L	GF	GA	GD	Pts
Brazil	5	4	0	1	143	130	+13	8
France	5	3	0	2	147	136	+11	6 (Note: Tiebreaker: 2 PTS / +4 GD)
Spain	5	3	0	2	142	131	+11	6 (Note: Tiebreaker: 2 PTS / –1 GD)
Norway	5	3	0	2	131	135	−4	6 (Note: Tiebreaker: 2 PTS / –3 GD)
Iran	5	2	0	3	153	158	−5	4
Tunisia	5	0	0	5	136	162	−26	0

Notes:

August 6; 14:30	France	32 – 27	Tunisia	Mubarak Hall, Suez; Referees: Horáček, Novotný (CZE)
August 6; 14:30	Perroneau 7	(18–14)	Hidri, Jaouadi 6	Mubarak Hall, Suez; Referees: Horáček, Novotný (CZE)
August 6; 14:30	2× (yellow card) 5× (suspension)	Report	3× (yellow card) 8× (suspension)	Mubarak Hall, Suez; Referees: Horáček, Novotný (CZE)

August 6; 16:30	Spain	22 – 25	Norway	Mubarak Hall, Suez; Referees: Pavićević, Ražnatović (MNE)
August 6; 16:30	Figueras 6	(10–11)	Hauge 8	Mubarak Hall, Suez; Referees: Pavićević, Ražnatović (MNE)
August 6; 16:30	3× (yellow card) 1× (suspension)	Report	3× (yellow card) 7× (suspension) 1× (red card)	Mubarak Hall, Suez; Referees: Pavićević, Ražnatović (MNE)

August 6; 18:30	Iran	27 – 31	Brazil	Mubarak Hall, Suez; Referees: Stark, Stefan (ROU)
August 6; 18:30	Masaeli 9	(16–12)	Medeiros, Chiuffa, Petrus 6	Mubarak Hall, Suez; Referees: Stark, Stefan (ROU)
August 6; 18:30	3× (yellow card) 3× (suspension)	Report	3× (yellow card) 3× (suspension)	Mubarak Hall, Suez; Referees: Stark, Stefan (ROU)

August 7; 14:30	Tunisia	28 – 32	Spain	Mubarak Hall, Suez; Referees: Stark, Stefan (ROU)
August 7; 14:30	Chouiref 11	(12–15)	Mindegia 6	Mubarak Hall, Suez; Referees: Stark, Stefan (ROU)
August 7; 14:30	2× (yellow card) 5× (suspension) 1× (red card)	Report	3× (yellow card) 1× (suspension)	Mubarak Hall, Suez; Referees: Stark, Stefan (ROU)

August 7; 16:30	Brazil	33 – 25	France	Mubarak Hall, Suez; Referees: Mezian, Bachir (ALG)
August 7; 16:30	Guimarães 8	(17–14)	Darras 7	Mubarak Hall, Suez; Referees: Mezian, Bachir (ALG)
August 7; 16:30	3× (yellow card) 7× (suspension)	Report	2× (yellow card) 4× (suspension) 1× (red card)	Mubarak Hall, Suez; Referees: Mezian, Bachir (ALG)

August 7; 18:30	Norway	30 – 26	Iran	Mubarak Hall, Suez; Referees: Horáček, Novotný (CZE)
August 7; 18:30	Hauge 10	(14–15)	A. Esteki 7	Mubarak Hall, Suez; Referees: Horáček, Novotný (CZE)
August 7; 18:30	3× (yellow card) 3× (suspension)	Report	3× (yellow card) 3× (suspension)	Mubarak Hall, Suez; Referees: Horáček, Novotný (CZE)

August 8; 14:30	France	29 – 23	Norway	Mubarak Hall, Suez; Referees: Stark, Stefan (ROU)
August 8; 14:30	Accambray 10	(16–12)	Hauge 9	Mubarak Hall, Suez; Referees: Stark, Stefan (ROU)
August 8; 14:30	3× (yellow card) 5× (suspension)	Report	3× (yellow card) 4× (suspension) 1× (red card)	Mubarak Hall, Suez; Referees: Stark, Stefan (ROU)

August 8; 16:30	Spain	35 – 36	Iran	Mubarak Hall, Suez; Referees: Mezian, Bachir (ALG)
August 8; 16:30	Maqueda 9	(17–17)	Masaeli 11	Mubarak Hall, Suez; Referees: Mezian, Bachir (ALG)
August 8; 16:30	3× (yellow card) 5× (suspension)	Report	3× (yellow card) 4× (suspension)	Mubarak Hall, Suez; Referees: Mezian, Bachir (ALG)

August 8; 18:30	Tunisia	28 – 31	Brazil	Mubarak Hall, Suez; Referees: Pavićević, Ražnatović (MNE)
August 8; 18:30	Hammouda 11	(14–17)	Maestro, Rocha 5	Mubarak Hall, Suez; Referees: Pavićević, Ražnatović (MNE)
August 8; 18:30	3× (yellow card) 7× (suspension)	Report	3× (yellow card) 5× (suspension) 1× (red card)	Mubarak Hall, Suez; Referees: Pavićević, Ražnatović (MNE)

August 10; 14:30	Spain	26 – 17	Brazil	Mubarak Hall, Suez; Referees: Stark, Stefan (ROU)
August 10; 14:30	Aguirrezabala 4	(12–21)	Medeiros 4	Mubarak Hall, Suez; Referees: Stark, Stefan (ROU)
August 10; 14:30	3× (yellow card) 5× (suspension)	Report	2× (yellow card) 3× (suspension)	Mubarak Hall, Suez; Referees: Stark, Stefan (ROU)

August 10; 16:30	Iran	26 – 36	France	Mubarak Hall, Suez; Referees: Pavićević, Ražnatović (MNE)
August 10; 16:30	S. Esteki 6	(12–22)	Massot-Pellet 11	Mubarak Hall, Suez; Referees: Pavićević, Ražnatović (MNE)
August 10; 16:30	3× (yellow card) 5× (suspension)	Report	3× (yellow card) 5× (suspension)	Mubarak Hall, Suez; Referees: Pavićević, Ražnatović (MNE)

August 10; 18:30	Norway	29 – 27	Tunisia	Mubarak Hall, Suez; Referees: Horáček, Novotný (CZE)
August 10; 18:30	Hauge 10	(17–14)	Chouiref 8	Mubarak Hall, Suez; Referees: Horáček, Novotný (CZE)
August 10; 18:30	3× (yellow card) 7× (suspension)	Report	3× (yellow card) 2× (suspension)	Mubarak Hall, Suez; Referees: Horáček, Novotný (CZE)

August 11; 14:30	Brazil	31 – 24	Norway	Mubarak Hall, Suez; Referees: Pavićević, Ražnatović (MNE)
August 11; 14:30	Medeiros, Rocha 6	(15–13)	Røe 6	Mubarak Hall, Suez; Referees: Pavićević, Ražnatović (MNE)
August 11; 14:30	3× (yellow card) 2× (suspension)	Report	3× (yellow card) 5× (suspension)	Mubarak Hall, Suez; Referees: Pavićević, Ražnatović (MNE)

August 11; 16:30	Iran	38 – 26	Tunisia	Mubarak Hall, Suez; Referees: Mezian, Bachir (ALG)
August 11; 16:30	S. Esteki 17	(19–14)	Hidri, Hammouda, Chouiref 5	Mubarak Hall, Suez; Referees: Mezian, Bachir (ALG)
August 11; 16:30	2× (yellow card) 2× (suspension)	Report	2× (yellow card) 5× (suspension)	Mubarak Hall, Suez; Referees: Mezian, Bachir (ALG)

August 11; 18:30	France	25 – 27	Spain	Mubarak Hall, Suez; Referees: Horáček, Novotný (CZE)
August 11; 18:30	Massot-Pellet, Accambray 6	(10–12)	Mindegia 7	Mubarak Hall, Suez; Referees: Horáček, Novotný (CZE)
August 11; 18:30	3× (yellow card) 6× (suspension)	Report	3× (yellow card) 6× (suspension)	Mubarak Hall, Suez; Referees: Horáček, Novotný (CZE)

=== Group C ===
Team	Pld	W	D	L	GF	GA	GD	Pts
Slovenia	5	5	0	0	182	134	+48	10
Sweden	5	4	0	1	181	128	+53	8
Estonia	5	3	0	2	161	164	−3	6
Netherlands	5	2	0	3	165	174	−9	4
Greenland	5	1	0	4	156	188	−32	2
Libya	5	0	0	5	111	168	−57	0

August 6; 14:30	Sweden	40 – 31	Netherlands	Port Said Hall, Port Said; Referees: Ikebuchi, Hizaki (JPN)
August 6; 14:30	Ekdahl 10	(17–16)	Boomhouwer 8	Port Said Hall, Port Said; Referees: Ikebuchi, Hizaki (JPN)
August 6; 14:30	3× (yellow card) 1× (suspension)	Report	3× (yellow card) 3× (suspension)	Port Said Hall, Port Said; Referees: Ikebuchi, Hizaki (JPN)

August 6; 16:30	Estonia	38 – 37	Greenland	Port Said Hall, Port Said; Referees: Paz, Souza (BRA)
August 6; 16:30	Patrail 9	(20–18)	Ak. Kreutzmann 8	Port Said Hall, Port Said; Referees: Paz, Souza (BRA)
August 6; 16:30	2× (yellow card) 4× (suspension)	Report	3× (yellow card) 2× (suspension)	Port Said Hall, Port Said; Referees: Paz, Souza (BRA)

August 6; 18:30	Slovenia	38 – 15	Libya	Port Said Hall, Port Said; Referees: Elíasson, Guðjónsson (ISL)
August 6; 18:30	Razgor 11	(17–9)	El-Shukri 4	Port Said Hall, Port Said; Referees: Elíasson, Guðjónsson (ISL)
August 6; 18:30	3× (yellow card) 3× (suspension)	Report	3× (yellow card) 8× (suspension) 1× (red card)	Port Said Hall, Port Said; Referees: Elíasson, Guðjónsson (ISL)

August 7; 14:30	Netherlands	29 – 33	Estonia	Port Said Hall, Port Said; Referees: Schaller, Wutzler (GER)
August 7; 14:30	Boomhouwer, Schagen, van Schie 6	(15–16)	Liiva 11	Port Said Hall, Port Said; Referees: Schaller, Wutzler (GER)
August 7; 14:30	3× (yellow card) 3× (suspension)	Report	2× (yellow card) 2× (suspension)	Port Said Hall, Port Said; Referees: Schaller, Wutzler (GER)

August 7; 16:30	Libya	13 – 33	Sweden	Port Said Hall, Port Said; Referees: Paz, Souza (BRA)
August 7; 16:30	Mohamed 4	(4–15)	Lindell 7	Port Said Hall, Port Said; Referees: Paz, Souza (BRA)
August 7; 16:30	2× (yellow card) 7× (suspension)	Report	3× (yellow card) 4× (suspension)	Port Said Hall, Port Said; Referees: Paz, Souza (BRA)

August 7; 18:30	Greenland	31 – 43	Slovenia	Port Said Hall, Port Said; Referees: Ikebuchi, Hizaki (JPN)
August 7; 18:30	An. Kreutzmann 8	(15–21)	Razgor, Dolenec 8	Port Said Hall, Port Said; Referees: Ikebuchi, Hizaki (JPN)
August 7; 18:30	3× (yellow card) 4× (suspension) 1× (red card)	Report	2× (yellow card) 6× (suspension)	Port Said Hall, Port Said; Referees: Ikebuchi, Hizaki (JPN)

August 8; 16:30	Estonia	29 – 31	Slovenia	Port Said Hall, Port Said; Referees: Paz, Souza (BRA)
August 8; 16:30	Patrail 13	(17–19)	Razgor 8	Port Said Hall, Port Said; Referees: Paz, Souza (BRA)
August 8; 16:30	2× (yellow card) 1× (suspension)	Report	3× (yellow card) 4× (suspension)	Port Said Hall, Port Said; Referees: Paz, Souza (BRA)

August 8; 18:30	Netherlands	36 – 27	Libya	Port Said Hall, Port Said; Referees: Ikebuchi, Hizaki (JPN)
August 8; 18:30	Haenen 9	(19–13)	Mohamed 10	Port Said Hall, Port Said; Referees: Ikebuchi, Hizaki (JPN)
August 8; 18:30	3× (yellow card)	Report	3× (yellow card) 2× (suspension)	Port Said Hall, Port Said; Referees: Ikebuchi, Hizaki (JPN)

August 8; 20:30	Sweden	42 – 24	Greenland	Port Said Hall, Port Said; Referees: Elíasson, Guðjónsson (ISL)
August 8; 20:30	Ekberg 6	(21–6)	An. Kreutzmann 11	Port Said Hall, Port Said; Referees: Elíasson, Guðjónsson (ISL)
August 8; 20:30	3× (yellow card) 5× (suspension)	Report	2× (yellow card) 6× (suspension)	Port Said Hall, Port Said; Referees: Elíasson, Guðjónsson (ISL)

August 10; 14:30	Estonia	34 – 30	Libya	Port Said Hall, Port Said; Referees: Elíasson, Guðjónsson (ISL)
August 10; 14:30	Pinnonen 8	(17–15)	Mohamed 9	Port Said Hall, Port Said; Referees: Elíasson, Guðjónsson (ISL)
August 10; 14:30	3× (yellow card) 3× (suspension)	Report	3× (yellow card) 6× (suspension) 2× (red card)	Port Said Hall, Port Said; Referees: Elíasson, Guðjónsson (ISL)

August 10; 16:30	Slovenia	33 –j 29	Sweden	Port Said Hall, Port Said; Referees: Schaller, Wutzler (GER)
August 10; 16:30	Bombac, Razgor 6	(17–16)	Ekberg 6	Port Said Hall, Port Said; Referees: Schaller, Wutzler (GER)
August 10; 16:30	3× (yellow card) 7× (suspension)	Report	2× (yellow card) 5× (suspension) 1× (red card)	Port Said Hall, Port Said; Referees: Schaller, Wutzler (GER)

August 10; 18:30	Greenland	37 – 39	Netherlands	Port Said Hall, Port Said; Referees: Paz, Souza (BRA)
August 10; 18:30	M. Heilmann 9	(15–22)	Schagen, van Schie 11	Port Said Hall, Port Said; Referees: Paz, Souza (BRA)
August 10; 18:30	3× (yellow card) 5× (suspension)	Report	3× (yellow card) 4× (suspension)	Port Said Hall, Port Said; Referees: Paz, Souza (BRA)

August 11; 14:30	Libya	26 – 27	Greenland	Port Said Hall, Port Said; Referees: Schaller (GER), Elíasson (ISL)
August 11; 14:30	Twini 8	(14–11)	Sørensen 7	Port Said Hall, Port Said; Referees: Schaller (GER), Elíasson (ISL)
August 11; 14:30	2× (yellow card) 7× (suspension)	Report	3× (yellow card) 5× (suspension)	Port Said Hall, Port Said; Referees: Schaller (GER), Elíasson (ISL)

August 11; 16:30	Slovenia	37 – 30	Netherlands	Port Said Hall, Port Said; Referees: Wutzler (GER), Guðjónsson (ISL)
August 11; 16:30	Rojc 6	(19–13)	Schagen 9	Port Said Hall, Port Said; Referees: Wutzler (GER), Guðjónsson (ISL)
August 11; 16:30	3× (yellow card) 6× (suspension)	Report	3× (yellow card) 4× (suspension)	Port Said Hall, Port Said; Referees: Wutzler (GER), Guðjónsson (ISL)

August 11; 18:30	Sweden	37 – 27	Estonia	Port Said Hall, Port Said; Referees: Ikebuchi, Hizaki (JPN)
August 11; 18:30	Ekberg 9	(19–13)	Patrail 13	Port Said Hall, Port Said; Referees: Ikebuchi, Hizaki (JPN)
August 11; 18:30	3× (yellow card) 3× (suspension)	Report	2× (yellow card) 1× (suspension)	Port Said Hall, Port Said; Referees: Ikebuchi, Hizaki (JPN)

=== Group D ===
Team	Pld	W	D	L	GF	GA	GD	Pts
Denmark	5	5	0	0	180	126	+54	10
Portugal	5	4	0	1	158	126	+32	8
Czech Republic	5	2	0	3	166	154	+12	4 (Note: Tiebreaker: 2 PTS)
Belarus	5	2	0	3	135	161	−26	4 (Note: Tiebreaker: 0 PTS)
Algeria	5	1	1	3	142	155	−13	3
Morocco	5	0	1	4	113	172	−59	1

Notes:

August 6; 14:30	Denmark	38 – 29	Algeria	Cairo Stadium Hall 2, Cairo; Referees: Baranowski, Lemanowicz (POL)
August 6; 14:30	Mortensen 8	(19–15)	Boumendjel 10	Cairo Stadium Hall 2, Cairo; Referees: Baranowski, Lemanowicz (POL)
August 6; 14:30	3× (yellow card) 1× (suspension)	Report	3× (yellow card) 5× (suspension)	Cairo Stadium Hall 2, Cairo; Referees: Baranowski, Lemanowicz (POL)

August 6; 16:30	Portugal	36 – 19	Morocco	Cairo Stadium Hall 2, Cairo; Referees: Grillo, Lenci (ARG)
August 6; 16:30	Pereira 6	(15–10)	Mehais 8	Cairo Stadium Hall 2, Cairo; Referees: Grillo, Lenci (ARG)
August 6; 16:30	2× (yellow card) 2× (suspension)	Report	3× (yellow card) 3× (suspension)	Cairo Stadium Hall 2, Cairo; Referees: Grillo, Lenci (ARG)

August 6; 18:30	Czech Republic	38 – 29	Belarus	Cairo Stadium Hall 2, Cairo; Referees: Abdel Aziz, Rashed (EGY)
August 6; 18:30	Hrstka 11	(19–16)	Baranau 10	Cairo Stadium Hall 2, Cairo; Referees: Abdel Aziz, Rashed (EGY)
August 6; 18:30	3× (yellow card) 3× (suspension)	Report	3× (yellow card) 3× (suspension)	Cairo Stadium Hall 2, Cairo; Referees: Abdel Aziz, Rashed (EGY)

August 7; 14:30	Algeria	27 – 31	Portugal	Cairo Stadium Hall 2, Cairo; Referees: Al-Marzouqi, Al-Nuaimi (UAE)
August 7; 14:30	Berkous 9	(11–20)	Pereira 9	Cairo Stadium Hall 2, Cairo; Referees: Al-Marzouqi, Al-Nuaimi (UAE)
August 7; 14:30	3× (yellow card) 4× (suspension)	Report	3× (yellow card) 4× (suspension)	Cairo Stadium Hall 2, Cairo; Referees: Al-Marzouqi, Al-Nuaimi (UAE)

August 7; 16:30	Belarus	21 – 38	Denmark	Cairo Stadium Hall 2, Cairo; Referees: Nikolić, Stojković (SRB)
August 7; 16:30	Haisa 5	(6–19)	Mikkelsen 8	Cairo Stadium Hall 2, Cairo; Referees: Nikolić, Stojković (SRB)
August 7; 16:30	3× (yellow card) 6× (suspension)	Report	3× (yellow card) 2× (suspension)	Cairo Stadium Hall 2, Cairo; Referees: Nikolić, Stojković (SRB)

August 7; 18:30	Morocco	22 – 37	Czech Republic	Cairo Stadium Hall 2, Cairo; Referees: Gubica, Milošević (CRO)
August 7; 18:30	Mehais 7	(8–21)	Hrstka 8	Cairo Stadium Hall 2, Cairo; Referees: Gubica, Milošević (CRO)
August 7; 18:30	3× (yellow card) 7× (suspension)	Report	3× (yellow card) 7× (suspension)	Cairo Stadium Hall 2, Cairo; Referees: Gubica, Milošević (CRO)

August 8; 14:30	Denmark	41 – 23	Morocco	Cairo Stadium Hall 2, Cairo; Referees: Abdel Aziz, Rashed (EGY)
August 8; 14:30	Rasmussen 9	(24–13)	Mehais 7	Cairo Stadium Hall 2, Cairo; Referees: Abdel Aziz, Rashed (EGY)
August 8; 14:30	2× (yellow card) 2× (suspension)	Report	2× (yellow card) 4× (suspension)	Cairo Stadium Hall 2, Cairo; Referees: Abdel Aziz, Rashed (EGY)

August 8; 16:30	Portugal	32 – 31	Czech Republic	Cairo Stadium Hall 2, Cairo; Referees: Coulibaly, Diabaté (CIV)
August 8; 16:30	Maia 8	(20–17)	Brykner 6	Cairo Stadium Hall 2, Cairo; Referees: Coulibaly, Diabaté (CIV)
August 8; 16:30	2× (yellow card) 2× (suspension) 1× (red card)	Report	3× (yellow card) 5× (suspension) 1× (red card)	Cairo Stadium Hall 2, Cairo; Referees: Coulibaly, Diabaté (CIV)

August 8; 18:30	Algeria	26 – 30	Belarus	Cairo Stadium Hall 2, Cairo; Referees: Grillo, Lenci (ARG)
August 8; 18:30	Hadjsadok 4	(12–15)	Baranau 8	Cairo Stadium Hall 2, Cairo; Referees: Grillo, Lenci (ARG)
August 8; 18:30	3× (yellow card) 4× (suspension)	Report	3× (yellow card) 7× (suspension)	Cairo Stadium Hall 2, Cairo; Referees: Grillo, Lenci (ARG)

August 10; 14:30	Portugal	37 – 24	Belarus	Cairo Stadium Hall 2, Cairo; Referees: Abdel Aziz, Rashed (EGY)
August 10; 14:30	Davyes 6	(21–12)	Prakapenia 8	Cairo Stadium Hall 2, Cairo; Referees: Abdel Aziz, Rashed (EGY)
August 10; 14:30	3× (yellow card) 2× (suspension)	Report	3× (yellow card) 3× (suspension)	Cairo Stadium Hall 2, Cairo; Referees: Abdel Aziz, Rashed (EGY)

August 10; 16:30	Czech Republic	31 – 38	Denmark	Cairo Stadium Hall 2, Cairo; Referees: Johansson, Kliko (SWE)
August 10; 16:30	Čip 11	(16–20)	Markussen, Rasmussen 7	Cairo Stadium Hall 2, Cairo; Referees: Johansson, Kliko (SWE)
August 10; 16:30	3× (yellow card) 5× (suspension)	Report	3× (yellow card) 4× (suspension)	Cairo Stadium Hall 2, Cairo; Referees: Johansson, Kliko (SWE)

August 10; 18:30	Morocco	27 – 27	Algeria	Cairo Stadium Hall 2, Cairo; Referees: Al-Marzouqi, Al-Nuaimi (UAE)
August 10; 18:30	Mehais 8	(13–13)	Midoune 8	Cairo Stadium Hall 2, Cairo; Referees: Al-Marzouqi, Al-Nuaimi (UAE)
August 10; 18:30	3× (yellow card) 3× (suspension)	Report	3× (yellow card) 8× (suspension)	Cairo Stadium Hall 2, Cairo; Referees: Al-Marzouqi, Al-Nuaimi (UAE)

August 11; 14:30	Belarus	31 – 22	Morocco	Cairo Stadium Hall 2, Cairo; Referees: Grillo (ARG), Al-Marzouqi (UAE)
August 11; 14:30	Baranau 10	(17–10)	Nassr 7	Cairo Stadium Hall 2, Cairo; Referees: Grillo (ARG), Al-Marzouqi (UAE)
August 11; 14:30	3× (yellow card) 10× (suspension)	Report	3× (yellow card) 10× (suspension) 1× (red card)	Cairo Stadium Hall 2, Cairo; Referees: Grillo (ARG), Al-Marzouqi (UAE)

August 11; 16:30	Czech Republic	29 – 33	Algeria	Cairo Stadium Hall 2, Cairo; Referees: Lenci (ARG), Al-Nuaimi (UAE)
August 11; 16:30	Hubacek 7	(14–18)	Boumendjel 6	Cairo Stadium Hall 2, Cairo; Referees: Lenci (ARG), Al-Nuaimi (UAE)
August 11; 16:30	3× (yellow card) 5× (suspension)	Report	2× (yellow card) 3× (suspension)	Cairo Stadium Hall 2, Cairo; Referees: Lenci (ARG), Al-Nuaimi (UAE)

August 11; 18:30	Denmark	25 – 22	Portugal	Cairo Stadium Hall 2, Cairo; Referees: Nikolić, Stojković (SRB)
August 11; 18:30	Markussen 10	(13–9)	Magalhães, J. Antunes, Davyes, Portela 4	Cairo Stadium Hall 2, Cairo; Referees: Nikolić, Stojković (SRB)
August 11; 18:30	3× (yellow card) 6× (suspension) 1× (red card)	Report	3× (yellow card) 6× (suspension)	Cairo Stadium Hall 2, Cairo; Referees: Nikolić, Stojković (SRB)

== Placement round ==
=== 21st–24th ===
Semifinal 21st–24th
August 13 – Suez
Kuwait	24
Tunisia	39
August 13 – Suez
Libya	17
Morocco	23

21st place
August 14 – Suez
Tunisia	28
Morocco	23
23rd place
August 14 – Suez
Kuwait	39
Libya	28

August 13; 17:00	Kuwait	24 – 39	Tunisia	Mubarak Hall, Suez; Referees: Horáček, Novotný (CZE)
August 13; 17:00	Al-Harbi 6	(10–19)	Chouiref 10	Mubarak Hall, Suez; Referees: Horáček, Novotný (CZE)
August 13; 17:00	2× (yellow card) 2× (suspension)	Report	3× (yellow card) 4× (suspension)	Mubarak Hall, Suez; Referees: Horáček, Novotný (CZE)

August 13; 19:30	Libya	17 – 23	Morocco	Mubarak Hall, Suez; Referees: Paz, Souza (BRA)
August 13; 19:30	Graab, Mohamed 4	(5–12)	Mehais 5	Mubarak Hall, Suez; Referees: Paz, Souza (BRA)
August 13; 19:30	3× (yellow card) 3× (suspension)	Report	2× (yellow card) 4× (suspension) 1× (red card)	Mubarak Hall, Suez; Referees: Paz, Souza (BRA)

==== 23rd/24th ====
August 14; 14:30	Kuwait	39 – 28	Libya	El Nasr Hall, Suez; Referees: Paz, Souza (BRA)
August 14; 14:30	M. Al-Gharaballi 18	(15–12)	Twini 9	El Nasr Hall, Suez; Referees: Paz, Souza (BRA)
August 14; 14:30	3× (yellow card) 2× (suspension)	Report	2× (yellow card) 4× (suspension)	El Nasr Hall, Suez; Referees: Paz, Souza (BRA)

==== 21st/22nd ====
August 14; 17:00	Tunisia	28 – 23	Morocco	Mubarak Hall, Suez; Referees: Abdel Aziz, Rashed (EGY)
August 14; 17:00	Lakhal 6	(12–11)	Baybay 6	Mubarak Hall, Suez; Referees: Abdel Aziz, Rashed (EGY)
August 14; 17:00	3× (yellow card) 4× (suspension)	Report	3× (yellow card) 2× (suspension)	Mubarak Hall, Suez; Referees: Abdel Aziz, Rashed (EGY)

=== 17th–20th ===
Semifinal 17th–20th
August 13 – Suez
Qatar	26
Iran	28
August 13 – Suez
Greenland	38
Algeria	33

17th place
August 14 – Suez
Iran	44
Greenland	34
19th place
August 14 – Suez
Qatar	26
Algeria	28

August 13; 14:30	Greenland	38 – 33	Algeria	Mubarak Hall, Suez; Referees: Grillo, Lenci (ARG)
August 13; 14:30	An. Kreutzmann 11	(22–20)	Berkous 7	Mubarak Hall, Suez; Referees: Grillo, Lenci (ARG)
August 13; 14:30	2× (yellow card) 5× (suspension)	Report	2× (yellow card) 5× (suspension)	Mubarak Hall, Suez; Referees: Grillo, Lenci (ARG)

August 13; 19:30	Qatar	26 – 28	Iran	El Nasr Hall, Suez; Referees: Abdel Aziz, Rashed (EGY)
August 13; 19:30	Abdulwahed 8	(15–20)	Samsami, Karimian 6	El Nasr Hall, Suez; Referees: Abdel Aziz, Rashed (EGY)
August 13; 19:30	3× (yellow card) 3× (suspension)	Report	3× (yellow card) 2× (suspension)	El Nasr Hall, Suez; Referees: Abdel Aziz, Rashed (EGY)

==== 19th/20th ====
August 14; 19:30	Qatar	26 – 28	Algeria	El Nasr Hall, Suez; Referees: Johansson, Kliko (SWE)
August 14; 19:30	Abdulwahed, Madadi 8	(13–13)	Boumendjel, Berkous 8	El Nasr Hall, Suez; Referees: Johansson, Kliko (SWE)
August 14; 19:30	3× (yellow card) 4× (suspension)	Report	2× (yellow card) 3× (suspension)	El Nasr Hall, Suez; Referees: Johansson, Kliko (SWE)

==== 17th/18th ====
August 14; 14:30	Iran	44 – 34	Greenland	Mubarak Hall, Suez; Referees: Ikebuchi, Hizaki (JPN)
August 14; 14:30	Masaeli 10	(20–18)	H. Kreutzmann 8	Mubarak Hall, Suez; Referees: Ikebuchi, Hizaki (JPN)
August 14; 14:30	3× (yellow card) 3× (suspension)	Report	3× (yellow card) 2× (suspension)	Mubarak Hall, Suez; Referees: Ikebuchi, Hizaki (JPN)

=== 13th–16th ===
Semifinal 13th–16th
August 13 – Suez
Iceland	34
Norway	24
August 13 – Suez
Netherlands	33
Belarus	30

13th place
August 14 – Suez
Iceland (2ET)	39
Netherlands	38
15th place
August 14 – Suez
Norway	18
Belarus	30

August 13; 14:30	Iceland	34 – 24	Norway	El Nasr Hall, Suez; Referees: Schaller, Wutzler (GER)
August 13; 14:30	Gústafsson 6	(20–11)	Paulsen 6	El Nasr Hall, Suez; Referees: Schaller, Wutzler (GER)
August 13; 14:30	1× (yellow card) 5× (suspension)	Report	3× (yellow card) 3× (suspension)	El Nasr Hall, Suez; Referees: Schaller, Wutzler (GER)

August 13; 17:00	Netherlands	33 – 30	Belarus	El Nasr Hall, Suez; Referees: Ikebuchi, Hizaki (JPN)
August 13; 17:00	Boomhouwer 9	(21–17)	Prakapenia 7	El Nasr Hall, Suez; Referees: Ikebuchi, Hizaki (JPN)
August 13; 17:00	2× (yellow card) 4× (suspension)	Report	3× (yellow card) 1× (suspension)	El Nasr Hall, Suez; Referees: Ikebuchi, Hizaki (JPN)

==== 15th/16th ====
August 14; 17:00	Norway	18 – 30	Belarus	El Nasr Hall, Suez; Referees: Mezian, Bachir (ALG)
August 14; 17:00	Paulsen 5	(7–16)	Prakapenia 9	El Nasr Hall, Suez; Referees: Mezian, Bachir (ALG)
August 14; 17:00	3× (yellow card) 9× (suspension)	Report	2× (yellow card) 9× (suspension)	El Nasr Hall, Suez; Referees: Mezian, Bachir (ALG)

==== 13th/14th ====
August 14
19:30
Iceland
39 – 38 (ET)
Netherlands
Mubarak Hall, Suez
Referees: Grillo, Lenci (ARG)
Gústafsson 10
(16–14)
Schagen 11
3× (yellow card) 9× (suspension) 1× (red card)
Report
3× (yellow card) 6× (suspension) 1× (red card)

FT: 30–30 ET: 4–4, 5–4

== Main round ==
=== Group I ===
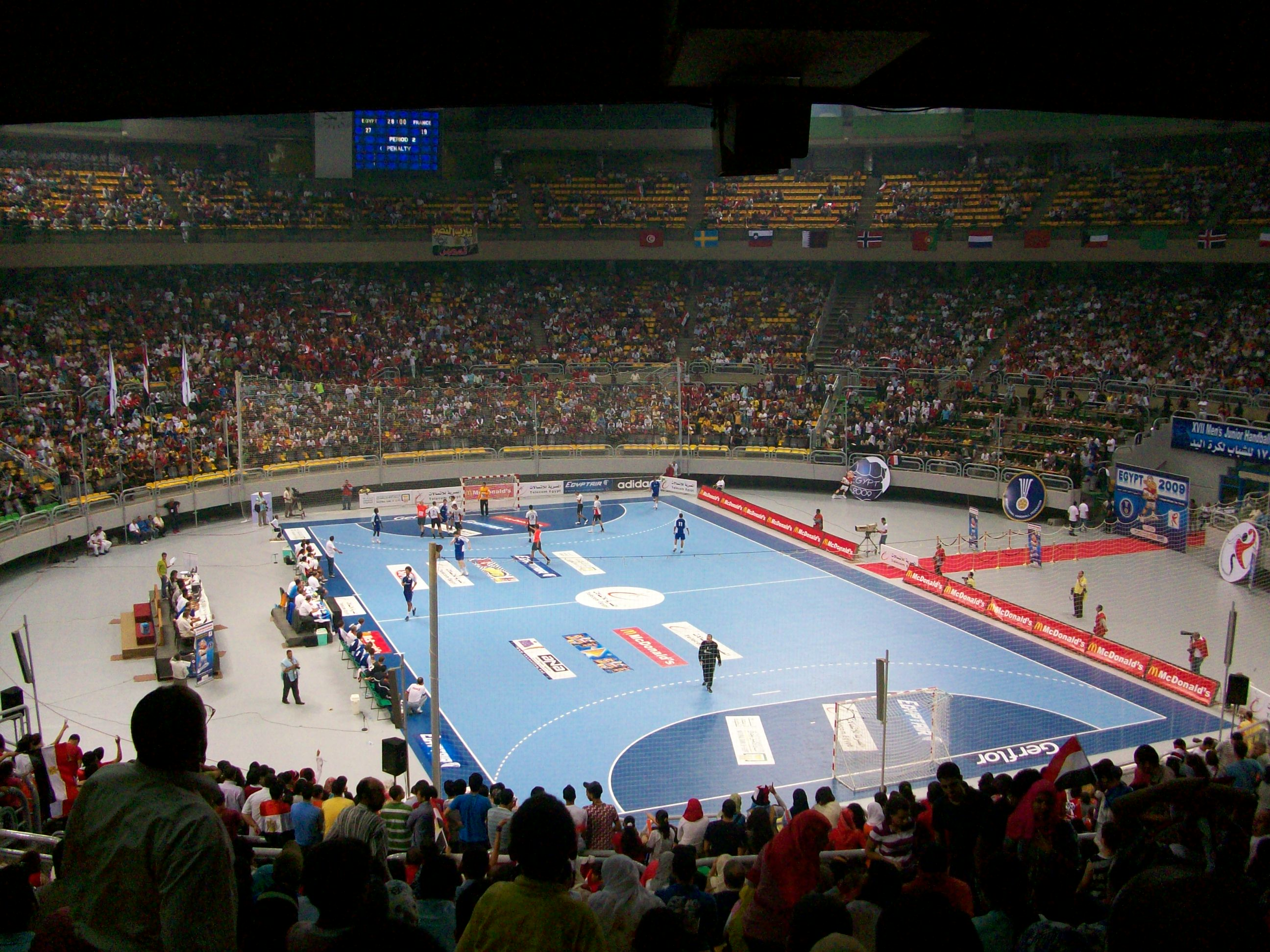
Egypt vs. France, Cairo Stadium Hall 1, August 15

Team	Pld	W	D	L	GF	GA	GD	Pts
Germany	5	4	0	1	138	132	+6	8 (Note: Tiebreaker: 2 PTS)
Egypt	5	4	0	1	124	113	+11	8 (Note: Tiebreaker: 0 PTS)
Argentina	5	3	1	1	124	116	+8	7
Spain	5	2	1	2	124	118	+6	5
Brazil	5	1	0	4	125	133	−8	2
France	5	0	0	5	118	141	−23	0

Notes:

August 13; 16:30	Argentina	27 – 25	Brazil	Cairo Stadium Hall 1, Cairo; Referees: Nikolić, Stojković (SRB)
August 13; 16:30	Fernández, Vieyra 7	(15–11)	Medeiros 10	Cairo Stadium Hall 1, Cairo; Referees: Nikolić, Stojković (SRB)
August 13; 16:30	3× (yellow card) 6× (suspension)	Report	3× (yellow card) 4× (suspension)	Cairo Stadium Hall 1, Cairo; Referees: Nikolić, Stojković (SRB)

August 13; 18:30	Germany	23 – 22	France	Cairo Stadium Hall 1, Cairo; Referees: Pavićević, Ražnatović (MNE)
August 13; 18:30	Gutbrod 6	(12–11)	Massot-Pellet 5	Cairo Stadium Hall 1, Cairo; Referees: Pavićević, Ražnatović (MNE)
August 13; 18:30	3× (yellow card) 7× (suspension)	Report	2× (yellow card) 7× (suspension) 1× (red card)	Cairo Stadium Hall 1, Cairo; Referees: Pavićević, Ražnatović (MNE)

August 13; 20:30	Egypt	23 – 21	Spain	Cairo Stadium Hall 1, Cairo; Referees: Stark, Stefan (ROU)
August 13; 20:30	Zein Abedin 5	(8–8)	González, Mindegia 7	Cairo Stadium Hall 1, Cairo; Referees: Stark, Stefan (ROU)
August 13; 20:30	3× (yellow card) 4× (suspension)	Report	3× (yellow card) 2× (suspension)	Cairo Stadium Hall 1, Cairo; Referees: Stark, Stefan (ROU)

August 14; 16:30	Spain	28 – 31	Germany	Cairo Stadium Hall 1, Cairo; Referees: Nikolić, Stojković (SRB)
August 14; 16:30	Saubich, Mindegia 6	(16–13)	Groetzki 7	Cairo Stadium Hall 1, Cairo; Referees: Nikolić, Stojković (SRB)
August 14; 16:30	3× (yellow card) 4× (suspension)	Report	3× (yellow card) 7× (suspension) 1× (red card)	Cairo Stadium Hall 1, Cairo; Referees: Nikolić, Stojković (SRB)

August 14; 18:30	France	24 – 30	Argentina	Cairo Stadium Hall 1, Cairo; Referees: Gubica, Milošević (CRO)
August 14; 18:30	Le Padellec 5	(10–17)	Vieyra 7	Cairo Stadium Hall 1, Cairo; Referees: Gubica, Milošević (CRO)
August 14; 18:30	3× (yellow card) 2× (suspension)	Report	3× (yellow card) 3× (suspension)	Cairo Stadium Hall 1, Cairo; Referees: Gubica, Milošević (CRO)

August 14; 20:30	Brazil	21 – 24	Egypt	Cairo Stadium Hall 1, Cairo; Referees: Elíasson, Guðjónsson (ISL)
August 14; 20:30	Teixeira, Maestro 4	(13–14)	Shebib, Yousef 6	Cairo Stadium Hall 1, Cairo; Referees: Elíasson, Guðjónsson (ISL)
August 14; 20:30	3× (yellow card) 1× (suspension)	Report	3× (yellow card) 3× (suspension)	Cairo Stadium Hall 1, Cairo; Referees: Elíasson, Guðjónsson (ISL)

August 15; 16:30	Argentina	22 – 22	Spain	Cairo Stadium Hall 1, Cairo; Referees: Elíasson, Guðjónsson (ISL)
August 15; 16:30	Vieyra 6	(9–11)	Mindegia 9	Cairo Stadium Hall 1, Cairo; Referees: Elíasson, Guðjónsson (ISL)
August 15; 16:30	3× (yellow card) 2× (suspension)	Report	3× (yellow card) 4× (suspension)	Cairo Stadium Hall 1, Cairo; Referees: Elíasson, Guðjónsson (ISL)

August 15; 18:30	Germany	31 – 29	Brazil	Cairo Stadium Hall 1, Cairo; Referees: Johansson, Kliko (SWE)
August 15; 18:30	Coßbau 8	(14–18)	Maestro 6	Cairo Stadium Hall 1, Cairo; Referees: Johansson, Kliko (SWE)
August 15; 18:30	3× (yellow card) 1× (suspension)	Report	3× (yellow card) 1× (red card)	Cairo Stadium Hall 1, Cairo; Referees: Johansson, Kliko (SWE)

August 15; 20:30	Egypt	28 – 22	France	Cairo Stadium Hall 1, Cairo; Referees: Horáček, Novotný (CZE)
August 15; 20:30	Hashem 6	(14–11)	Gomis 4	Cairo Stadium Hall 1, Cairo; Referees: Horáček, Novotný (CZE)
August 15; 20:30	3× (yellow card) 5× (suspension)	Report	3× (yellow card) 3× (suspension)	Cairo Stadium Hall 1, Cairo; Referees: Horáček, Novotný (CZE)

=== Group II ===
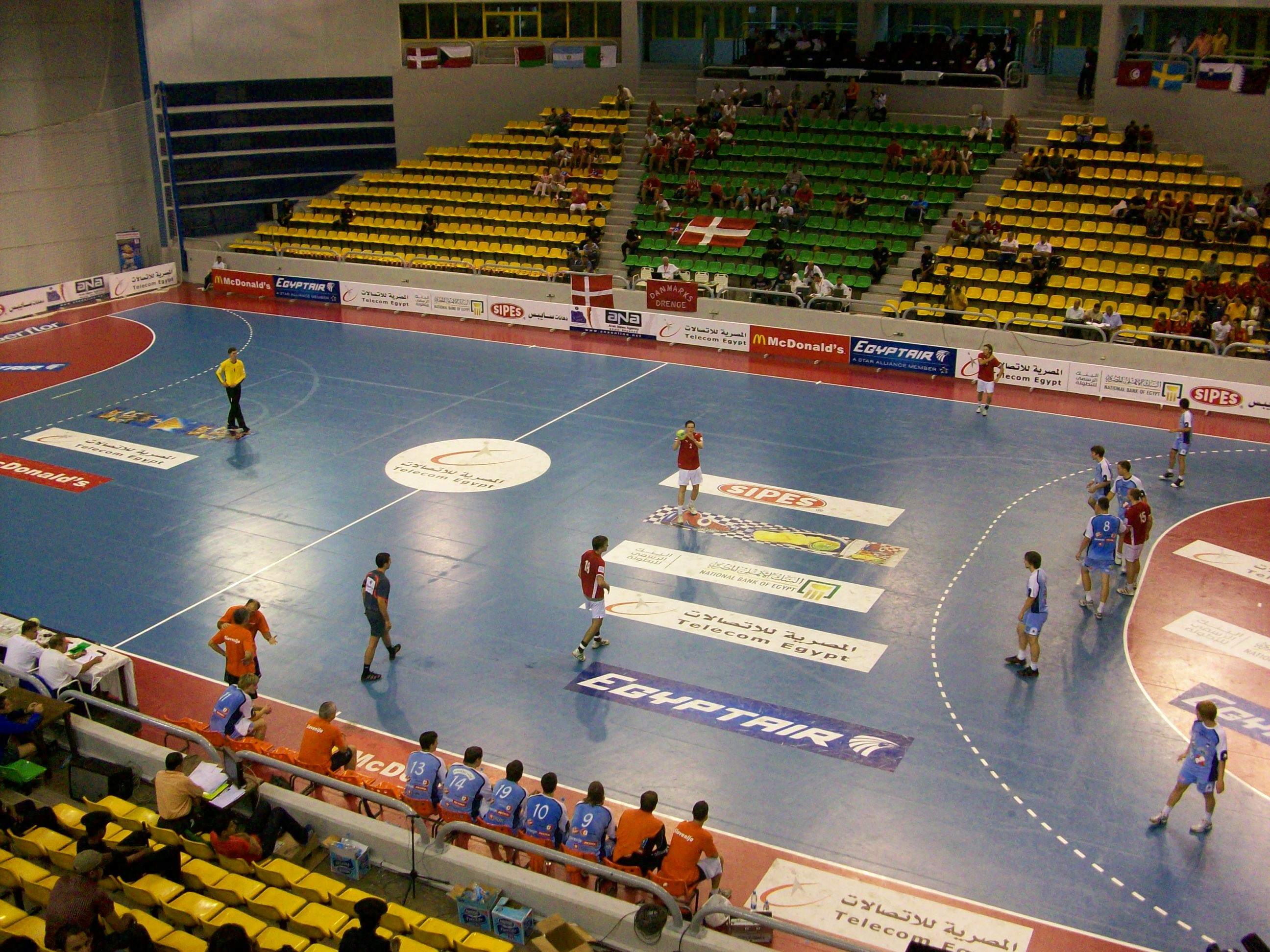
Slovenia x Denmark. Cairo Stadium Hall 2. August 15.

Team	Pld	W	D	L	GF	GA	GD	Pts
Denmark	5	5	0	0	158	124	+34	10
Slovenia	5	4	0	1	155	149	+6	8
Sweden	5	3	0	2	165	142	+23	6
Portugal	5	2	0	3	138	147	−9	4
Czech Republic	5	1	0	4	163	181	−18	2
Estonia	5	0	0	5	139	175	−36	0

August 13; 14:30	Sweden	44 – 29	Czech Republic	Cairo Stadium Hall 2, Cairo; Referees: Gubica, Milošević (CRO)
August 13; 14:30	Månsson, Aren 6	(23–13)	Hrstka 11	Cairo Stadium Hall 2, Cairo; Referees: Gubica, Milošević (CRO)
August 13; 14:30	3× (yellow card) 4× (suspension) 1× (red card)	Report	3× (yellow card) 8× (suspension) 1× (red card)	Cairo Stadium Hall 2, Cairo; Referees: Gubica, Milošević (CRO)

August 13; 16:30	Estonia	21 – 35	Denmark	Cairo Stadium Hall 2, Cairo; Referees: Al-Marzouqi, Al-Nuaimi (UAE)
August 13; 16:30	Patrail 7	(9–23)	Jørgensen, Schriver 5	Cairo Stadium Hall 2, Cairo; Referees: Al-Marzouqi, Al-Nuaimi (UAE)
August 13; 16:30	3× (yellow card) 3× (suspension)	Report	3× (yellow card) 6× (suspension) 1× (red card)	Cairo Stadium Hall 2, Cairo; Referees: Al-Marzouqi, Al-Nuaimi (UAE)

August 13; 18:30	Slovenia	29 – 27	Portugal	Cairo Stadium Hall 2, Cairo; Referees: Elíasson, Guðjónsson (ISL)
August 13; 18:30	Dolenec 7	(15–12)	Davyes 12	Cairo Stadium Hall 2, Cairo; Referees: Elíasson, Guðjónsson (ISL)
August 13; 18:30	3× (yellow card) 4× (suspension)	Report	3× (yellow card) 5× (suspension)	Cairo Stadium Hall 2, Cairo; Referees: Elíasson, Guðjónsson (ISL)

August 14; 14:30	Denmark	30 – 25	Sweden	Cairo Stadium Hall 2, Cairo; Referees: Stark, Stefan (ROU)
August 14; 14:30	Markussen 7	(17–9)	Stenbäcken 7	Cairo Stadium Hall 2, Cairo; Referees: Stark, Stefan (ROU)
August 14; 14:30	2× (yellow card) 2× (suspension)	Report	3× (yellow card) 6× (suspension) 1× (red card)	Cairo Stadium Hall 2, Cairo; Referees: Stark, Stefan (ROU)

August 14; 16:30	Czech Republic	34 – 37	Slovenia	Cairo Stadium Hall 2, Cairo; Referees: Coulibaly, Diabaté (CIV)
August 14; 16:30	Hrstka 10	(17–16)	Razgor 9	Cairo Stadium Hall 2, Cairo; Referees: Coulibaly, Diabaté (CIV)
August 14; 16:30	3× (yellow card) 3× (suspension)	Report	3× (yellow card) 5× (suspension)	Cairo Stadium Hall 2, Cairo; Referees: Coulibaly, Diabaté (CIV)

August 14; 18:30	Portugal	34 – 32	Estonia	Cairo Stadium Hall 2, Cairo; Referees: Pavićević, Ražnatović (MNE)
August 14; 18:30	Magalhães, J. Antunes 6	(15–12)	Patrail 8	Cairo Stadium Hall 2, Cairo; Referees: Pavićević, Ražnatović (MNE)
August 14; 18:30	3× (yellow card) 5× (suspension)	Report	3× (yellow card)	Cairo Stadium Hall 2, Cairo; Referees: Pavićević, Ražnatović (MNE)

August 15; 14:30	Estonia	30 – 38	Czech Republic	Cairo Stadium Hall 2, Cairo; Referees: Stark, Stefan (ROU)
August 15; 14:30	Sillaste 7	(16–22)	Hrstka, Čip 10	Cairo Stadium Hall 2, Cairo; Referees: Stark, Stefan (ROU)
August 15; 14:30	3× (yellow card) 2× (suspension)	Report	3× (yellow card) 5× (suspension)	Cairo Stadium Hall 2, Cairo; Referees: Stark, Stefan (ROU)

August 15; 16:30	Sweden	30 – 23	Portugal	Cairo Stadium Hall 2, Cairo; Referees: Schaller, Wutzler (GER)
August 15; 16:30	Ekberg 11	(12–11)	Portela 6	Cairo Stadium Hall 2, Cairo; Referees: Schaller, Wutzler (GER)
August 15; 16:30	2× (yellow card) 5× (suspension) 1× (red card)	Report	3× (yellow card) 4× (suspension)	Cairo Stadium Hall 2, Cairo; Referees: Schaller, Wutzler (GER)

August 15; 18:30	Slovenia	25 – 30	Denmark	Cairo Stadium Hall 2, Cairo; Referees: Pavićević, Ražnatović (MNE)
August 15; 18:30	Paladin, Dolenec 4	(10–14)	Sørensen 9	Cairo Stadium Hall 2, Cairo; Referees: Pavićević, Ražnatović (MNE)
August 15; 18:30	3× (yellow card) 4× (suspension)	Report	3× (yellow card) 3× (suspension)	Cairo Stadium Hall 2, Cairo; Referees: Pavićević, Ražnatović (MNE)

== Placement matches ==
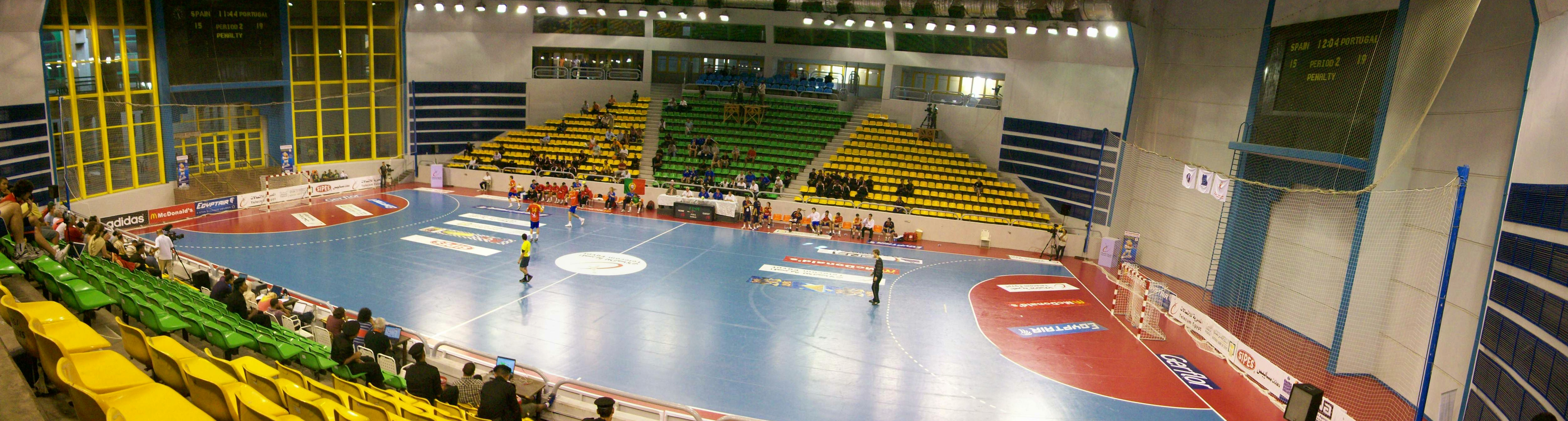
Panorama of action during match between Spain and Portugal. Cairo Stadium Hall 2, August 17.

=== 11th/12th ===
August 17; 11:30	France	32 – 29	Estonia	Cairo Stadium Hall 2, Cairo; Referees: Coulibaly, Diabaté (CIV)
August 17; 11:30	Accambray 9	(12–13)	Patrail 12	Cairo Stadium Hall 2, Cairo; Referees: Coulibaly, Diabaté (CIV)
August 17; 11:30	3× (yellow card) 4× (suspension)	Report	2× (yellow card) 3× (suspension)	Cairo Stadium Hall 2, Cairo; Referees: Coulibaly, Diabaté (CIV)

=== 9th/10th ===
August 17; 14:00	Brazil	36 – 31	Czech Republic	Cairo Stadium Hall 2, Cairo; Referees: Al-Marzouqi, Al-Nuaimi (UAE)
August 17; 14:00	Teixeira 11	(18–16)	Hrstka 9	Cairo Stadium Hall 2, Cairo; Referees: Al-Marzouqi, Al-Nuaimi (UAE)
August 17; 14:00	3× (yellow card) 3× (suspension)	Report	3× (yellow card) 6× (suspension) 1× (red card)	Cairo Stadium Hall 2, Cairo; Referees: Al-Marzouqi, Al-Nuaimi (UAE)

=== 7th/8th ===
August 17; 16:30	Spain	24 – 28	Portugal	Cairo Stadium Hall 2, Cairo; Referees: Grillo, Lenci (ARG)
August 17; 16:30	Ruiz 6	(11–13)	F. Antunes, Magalhães 7	Cairo Stadium Hall 2, Cairo; Referees: Grillo, Lenci (ARG)
August 17; 16:30	3× (yellow card) 1× (suspension)	Report	3× (yellow card) 4× (suspension)	Cairo Stadium Hall 2, Cairo; Referees: Grillo, Lenci (ARG)

=== 5th/6th ===
August 17
15:30
Argentina
30 – 32 (ET)
Sweden
Cairo Stadium Hall 1, Cairo
Referees: Abdel Aziz, Rashed (EGY)
J. Fernández 10
(10–15)
Ekberg 10
3× (yellow card) 4× (suspension)
Report
3× (yellow card) 5× (suspension)

FT: 25–25 ET: 5–7

== Final round ==
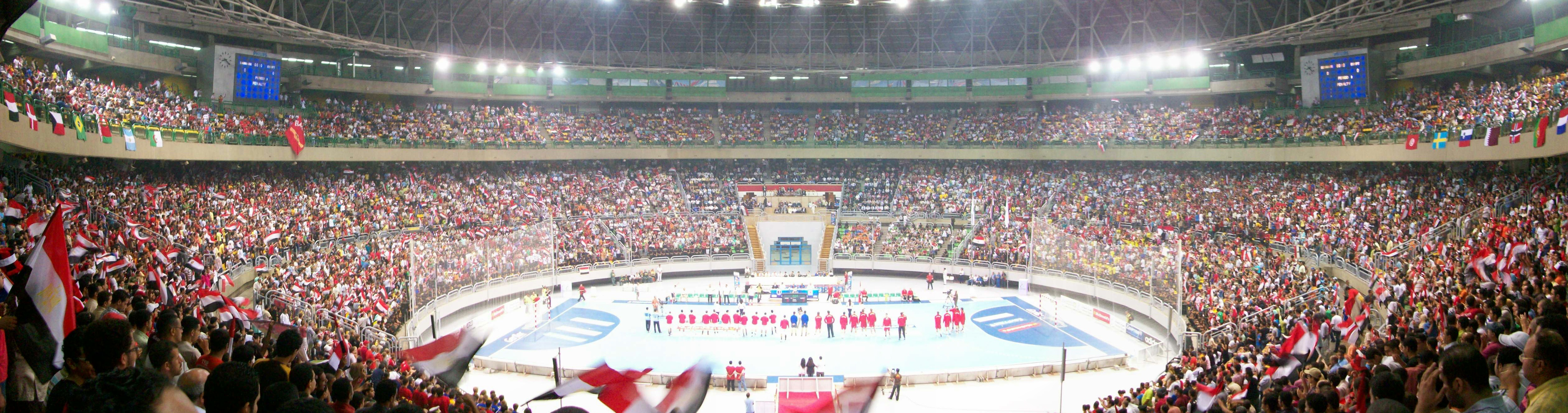
Panorama of line-up before the Semi Final between Denmark and Egypt. Cairo Stadium Hall 1, August 17.

Semifinal
August 17 – Cairo
Germany	27
Slovenia	23
August 17 – Cairo
Denmark	27
Egypt	21

Final
August 19 – Cairo
Germany	32
Denmark	24
Third place
August 19 – Cairo
Slovenia	35
Egypt	24

=== Semifinals ===
August 17; 18:00	Germany	27 – 23	Slovenia	Cairo Stadium Hall 1, Cairo; Referees: Stark, Stefan (ROU)
August 17; 18:00	Hafner 6	(11–13)	Razgor 6	Cairo Stadium Hall 1, Cairo; Referees: Stark, Stefan (ROU)
August 17; 18:00	2× (yellow card) 2× (suspension)	Report	3× (yellow card) 3× (suspension)	Cairo Stadium Hall 1, Cairo; Referees: Stark, Stefan (ROU)

August 17; 20:30	Denmark	27 – 21	Egypt	Cairo Stadium Hall 1, Cairo; Referees: Nikolić, Stojković (SRB)
August 17; 20:30	Mortensen, Rasmussen 6	(11–7)	Zein Abedin 5	Cairo Stadium Hall 1, Cairo; Referees: Nikolić, Stojković (SRB)
August 17; 20:30	3× (yellow card) 1× (suspension)	Report	3× (yellow card) 3× (suspension)	Cairo Stadium Hall 1, Cairo; Referees: Nikolić, Stojković (SRB)

=== Bronze medal match ===
August 19; 17:00	Slovenia	35 – 24	Egypt	Cairo Stadium Hall 1, Cairo; Referees: Johansson, Kliko (SWE)
August 19; 17:00	Dolenec 9	(18–11)	Zein Abedin 5	Cairo Stadium Hall 1, Cairo; Referees: Johansson, Kliko (SWE)
August 19; 17:00	3× (yellow card) 4× (suspension)	Report	2× (yellow card) 4× (suspension)	Cairo Stadium Hall 1, Cairo; Referees: Johansson, Kliko (SWE)

=== Gold medal match ===
August 19; 19:30	Germany	32 – 24	Denmark	Cairo Stadium Hall 1, Cairo; Referees: Horáček, Novotný (CZE)
August 19; 19:30	Wiencek 8	(13–11)	Jepsen 6	Cairo Stadium Hall 1, Cairo; Referees: Horáček, Novotný (CZE)
August 19; 19:30	3× (yellow card) 5× (suspension)	Report	3× (yellow card) 1× (suspension)	Cairo Stadium Hall 1, Cairo; Referees: Horáček, Novotný (CZE)

== Final standings ==
Rank	Team
Gold medal	Germany
Silver medal	Denmark
Bronze medal	Slovenia
4	Egypt
5	Sweden
6	Argentina
7	Portugal
8	Spain
9	Brazil
10	Czech Republic
11	France
12	Estonia
13	Iceland
14	Netherlands
15	Belarus
16	Norway
17	Iran
18	Greenland
19	Algeria
20	Qatar
21	Tunisia
22	Morocco
23	Kuwait
24	Libya

== Statistics and awards ==
=== Top goalscorers ===
Rank	Name	Team	Goals	Shots	Rate %	Played	Mean	7m-thr.	Assists
1	Mait Patrail	Estonia	81	154	52,6 %	9	9,0	20/30	49
2	David Razgor	Slovenia	68	89	76,4 %	10	6,8	11/14	2
3	Jakub Hrstka	Czech Republic	67	86	77,9 %	9	7,4	19/22	5
4	Mohammad Al-Gharaballi	Kuwait	62	132	47,0 %	7	8,9	10/13	5
5	Federico Vieyra	Argentina	54	113	47,8 %	9	6,0	1/2	6
6	Sajjad Esteki	Iran	53	103	51,5 %	7	7,6	4/7	7
7	Patrick Groetzki	Germany	52	81	64,2 %	10	5,2	11/14	9
8	Niclas Ekberg	Sweden	51	67	76,1 %	8	6,4	18/22	2
8	Niko Mindegía	Spain	51	75	68,0 %	9	5,7	15/18	8
10	Bobby Schagen	Netherlands	49	73	67,1 %	7	7,0	15/18	16
10	Angutimmarik Kreutzmann	Greenland	49	87	56,3 %	7	7,0	1/2	36

Source: IHF

=== Top goalkeepers ===
Rank	Name	Team	Saves	Shots	Rate %	Played	Mean
1	Karim Hendawy	Egypt	122	328	37,2 %	10	12,2
2	Leonel Maciel	Argentina	121	314	38,5 %	9	13,4
3	Mikael Appelgren	Sweden	101	236	42,8 %	9	11,2
4	Aljoša Čudić	Slovenia	99	292	33,9 %	10	9,9
5	Tomáš Mrkva	Czech Republic	97	297	32,7 %	9	10,8
6	Niklas Landin Jacobsen	Denmark	91	226	40,3 %	10	9,1
7	Bruno Dias	Portugal	89	265	33,6 %	9	9,9
8	Gonzalo Pérez de Vargas	Spain	87	230	37,8 %	9	9,7
9	Magnus Dahl	Norway	87	232	37,5 %	7	12,4
10	Victor João	Brazil	84	230	36,5 %	9	9,3

Source: IHF

=== Awards ===
The All-star Team was announced on 19 August 2009.

- Goalkeeper: Karim Hendawy (EGY)
- Left wing: David Razgor (SLO)
- Left back: Nikolaj Markussen (DEN)
- Pivot: Frederik Børm (DEN)
- Centre back: Andrej Kogut (GER)
- Right back: Federico Vieyra (ARG)
- Right wing: Patrick Groetzki (GER)
