= 2014 African Men's Handball Championship =

International handball competition

2014 African Men's Championship

Tournament details
- Host country: Algeria
- Venue(s): 3 (in 2 host cities)
- Dates: 16–25 January
- Teams: 12 (from 1 confederation)

Final positions
- Champions: Algeria (7th title)
- Runners-up: Tunisia
- Third place: Egypt
- Fourth place: Angola

Tournament statistics
- Matches played: 42
- Goals scored: 2,255 (53.69 per match)
- Top scorer(s): (Algeria) Messaoud Berkous (44 goals)

Awards
- Best player: (Algeria) Messaoud Berkous

The 2014 African Men's Handball Championship was the 21st edition of the African Men's Handball Championship, held in Algiers and Chéraga, Algeria, from 16 to 25 January 2014. It acted as the African qualifying tournament for the 2015 World Men's Handball Championship in Qatar.

In the final, hosts Algeria beat Tunisia 25–21 to win their seventh title after beating

== Qualification ==
=== Qualified teams ===
Country	Previous appearances in tournament^{1}
Algeria	19 (1976, 1979, **1981**, **1983**, **1985**, **1987**, **1989**, 1991, 1992, 1994, **1996**, 1998, 2000, 2002, 2004, 2006, 2008, 2010, 2012)
Angola	12 (1981, 1983, 1985, 1987, 1989, 1998, 2002, 2004, 2006, 2008, 2010, 2012)
Cameroon	11 (1974, 1976, 1979, 1996, 1998, 2002, 2004, 2006, 2008, 2010, 2012)
Congo	16 (1979, 1981, 1983, 1985, 1987, 1989, 1991, 1994, 1996, 1998, 2002, 2004, 2006, 2010, 2012)
DR Congo	8 (1992, 2000, 2002, 2004, 2006, 2008, 2010, 2012)
Egypt	18 (1979, 1981, 1983, 1985, 1987, 1989, **1991**, **1992**, 1994, 1996, 1998, **2000**, 2002, **2004**, 2006, **2008**, 2010, 2012)
Gabon	5 (2000, 2002, 2006, 2010, 2012)
Libya	2 (2004, 2010)
Morocco	15 (1987, 1989, 1991, 1992, 1994, 1996, 1998, 2000, 2002, 2004, 2006, 2008, 2010, 2012)
Nigeria	8 (1979, 1981, 1996, 1998, 2002, 2006, 2008, 2010)
Senegal	8 (1974, 1976, 1991, 1992, 1994, 2002, 2004, 2012)
Tunisia	20 (**1974**, **1976**, **1979**, 1981, 1983, 1985, 1987, 1989, 1991, 1992, **1994**, 1996, **1998**, 2000, **2002**, 2004, **2006**, 2008, **2010**, **2012**)

^{1} Bold indicates champion for that year. Italics indicates host.

== Venues ==
Algiers
Hacène Harcha Arena	La Coupole d’Alger Arena
Capacity: 8,000	Capacity: 5,500
Chéraga	2014 African Men's Handball Championship is located in Algeria
Salle Chéraga	2014 African Men's Handball Championship is located in Algeria
Capacity: 3,000	2014 African Men's Handball Championship is located in Algeria

== Referees ==
11 couples were announced for the competition.

Country	Referees
Algeria	Mustapha Deche; Mohamed Ghouarda
Algeria	Khadidja Benfetima; Zahra Benfetima
Benin	Jonas Allad; Armand Dagba
DR Congo	Ngombo Felly Amba; Mutombo Gisèle Tshilanda
Egypt	Rashed Mohamed; Fakry Elsayed Tamer

Country	Referees
Guinea	Mouhamed Ball Camara; Aboubacar Diakité
Ivory Coast	Yalatima Nanga Coulibaly; Mamadou Diabate
Senegal	Mohamed Cheick Diop; Abdoulaye Faye
Togo	Yawo Mawusse Akpatsa; Agbekokokou Assignon
Tunisia	Ismaïl Boualloucha; Ramzi Khenissi

Country	Referees
Portugal	Ivan Caçador; Eurico Nicolau

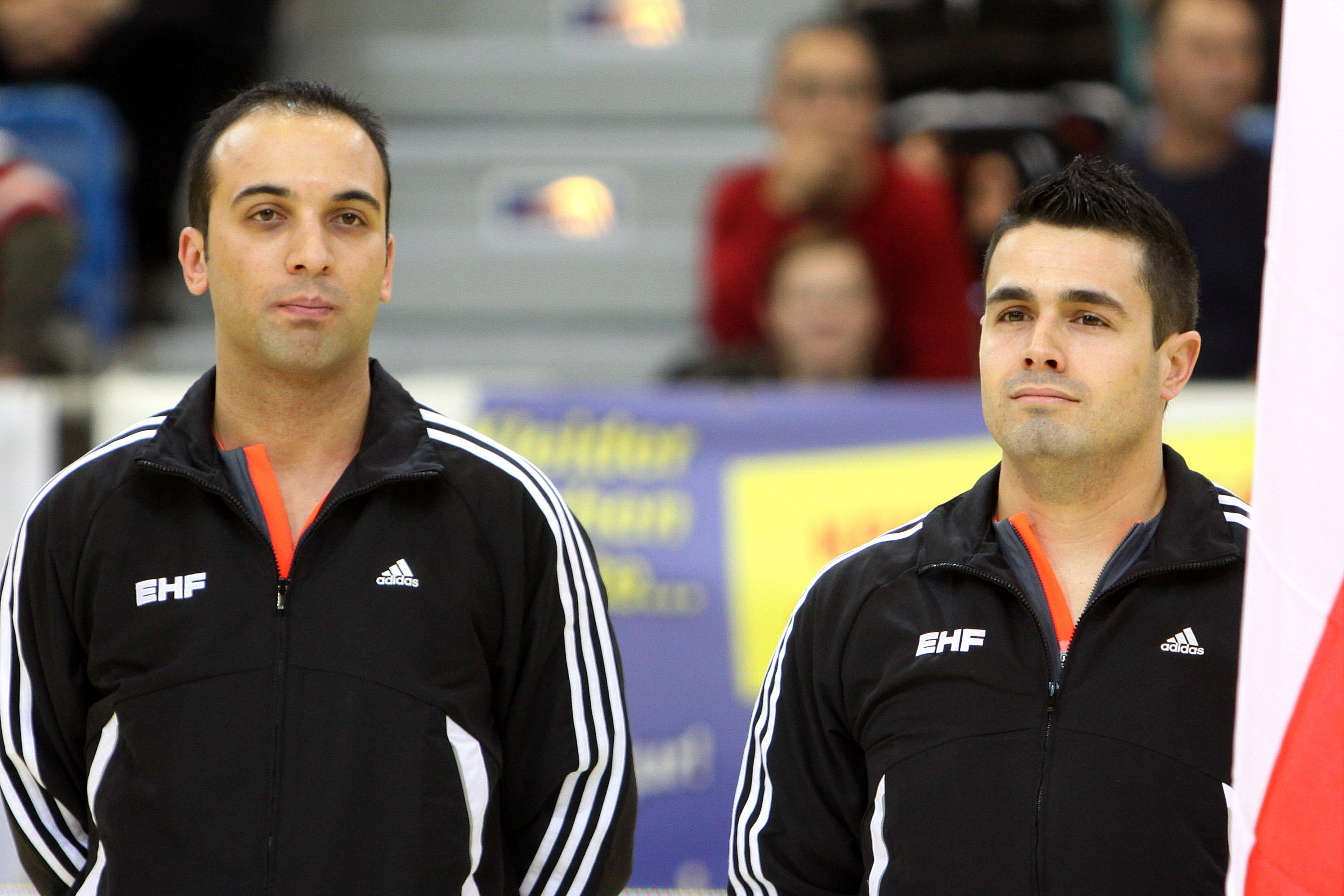
Ivan Caçador & Eurico Nicolau, the Portuguese referees invitee for the competition

== Draw ==
The draw was held on 9 October 2013.

Group A	Group B
Tunisia; Egypt; Senegal; Cameroon; Gabon; Libya	Algeria; Morocco; Angola; Congo; DR Congo; Nigeria

== Preliminary round ==
All times are local (UTC+1).

Team advance to the Knockout stage

=== Group A ===
Team	Pld	W	D	L	GF	GA	GD	Pts
Tunisia	5	5	0	0	157	103	+54	10
Egypt	5	4	0	1	142	105	+37	8
Cameroon	5	2	1	2	128	144	−16	5
Senegal	5	2	0	3	138	152	−14	4
Gabon	5	1	0	4	121	147	−26	2
Libya	5	0	1	4	103	138	−35	1

16 January 2014; 10:00	Egypt	32–21	Senegal	Salle Harcha, Algiers; Referees: Allade, Dagba (BEN)
16 January 2014; 10:00	El-Ahmar 7	(19–9)	Sarr 5	Salle Harcha, Algiers; Referees: Allade, Dagba (BEN)
16 January 2014; 10:00	2× (yellow card) 5× (suspension)	Report	2× (yellow card) 3× (suspension)	Salle Harcha, Algiers; Referees: Allade, Dagba (BEN)

16 January 2014; 12:15	Tunisia	27–18	Libya	La Coupole, Algiers; Referees: Deche, Ghouarda (ALG)
16 January 2014; 12:15	Boughanmi 6	(13–8)	El Bernawi 3	La Coupole, Algiers; Referees: Deche, Ghouarda (ALG)
16 January 2014; 12:15	3× (yellow card) 4× (suspension)	Report	3× (yellow card) 2× (suspension) 1× (red card)	La Coupole, Algiers; Referees: Deche, Ghouarda (ALG)

16 January 2014; 12:15	Cameroon	28–26	Gabon	Salle omnisports, Chéraga; Referees: Caçador, Nicolau (POR)
16 January 2014; 12:15	Yamo 9	(13–8)	Aubyang 8	Salle omnisports, Chéraga; Referees: Caçador, Nicolau (POR)
16 January 2014; 12:15	3× (yellow card) 7× (suspension)	Report	3× (yellow card) 5× (suspension)	Salle omnisports, Chéraga; Referees: Caçador, Nicolau (POR)

17 January 2014; 16:15	Libya	23–35	Senegal	La Coupole, Algiers; Referees: Benfetima, Benfetima (ALG)
17 January 2014; 16:15	Galmoz, Ben Zegiam 5	(13–19)	Sarr 8	La Coupole, Algiers; Referees: Benfetima, Benfetima (ALG)
17 January 2014; 16:15	3× (yellow card) 7× (suspension)	Report	3× (yellow card) 6× (suspension) 1× (red card)	La Coupole, Algiers; Referees: Benfetima, Benfetima (ALG)

17 January 2014; 18:30	Gabon	23–33	Tunisia	La Coupole, Algiers; Referees: Akpatsa, Assignon (TOG)
17 January 2014; 18:30	four players 4	(12–14)	three players 5	La Coupole, Algiers; Referees: Akpatsa, Assignon (TOG)
17 January 2014; 18:30	4× (yellow card) 4× (suspension)	Report	4× (yellow card) 6× (suspension)	La Coupole, Algiers; Referees: Akpatsa, Assignon (TOG)

17 January 2014; 20:15	Cameroon	22–33	Egypt	Salle Harcha, Algiers; Referees: Coulibaly, Diabate (CIV)
17 January 2014; 20:15	Bekono, Enoh 4	(11–18)	El Sayed, Hashem 5	Salle Harcha, Algiers; Referees: Coulibaly, Diabate (CIV)
17 January 2014; 20:15	4× (yellow card) 3× (suspension)	Report	2× (yellow card) 6× (suspension)	Salle Harcha, Algiers; Referees: Coulibaly, Diabate (CIV)

18 January 2014; 15:45	Senegal	22–37	Tunisia	Salle Harcha, Algiers
18 January 2014; 15:45	Diarra 4	(8–17)	Tej, Boughanmi 7	Salle Harcha, Algiers
18 January 2014; 15:45	4× (yellow card) 5× (suspension)	Report	2× (yellow card) 5× (suspension)	Salle Harcha, Algiers

18 January 2014; 18:30	Libya	21–21	Cameroon	La Coupole, Algiers; Referees: Camara, Diakite (GUI)
18 January 2014; 18:30	G. Mohamed, Moez 5	(10–13)	Yamo 5	La Coupole, Algiers; Referees: Camara, Diakite (GUI)
18 January 2014; 18:30	3× (yellow card) 6× (suspension)	Report	3× (yellow card) 4× (suspension)	La Coupole, Algiers; Referees: Camara, Diakite (GUI)

18 January 2014; 20:15	Egypt	30–21	Gabon	Salle Harcha, Algiers; Referees: Caçador, Nicolau (POR)
18 January 2014; 20:15	Hashem 6	(16–10)	Tsagoulela, Aubyang 4	Salle Harcha, Algiers; Referees: Caçador, Nicolau (POR)
18 January 2014; 20:15	2× (yellow card) 1× (suspension)	Report	3× (yellow card) 4× (suspension)	Salle Harcha, Algiers; Referees: Caçador, Nicolau (POR)

20 January 2014; 14:00	Senegal	30–23	Gabon	La Coupole, Algiers
20 January 2014; 14:00		(13–12)		La Coupole, Algiers
20 January 2014; 14:00		Report		La Coupole, Algiers

20 January 2014; 15:45	Tunisia	34–20	Cameroon	Salle Harcha, Algiers; Referees: Caçador, Nicolau (POR)
20 January 2014; 15:45	Jallouz 5	(22–12)	Enoh 8	Salle Harcha, Algiers; Referees: Caçador, Nicolau (POR)
20 January 2014; 15:45	3× (yellow card) 1× (suspension)	Report	3× (yellow card) 6× (suspension)	Salle Harcha, Algiers; Referees: Caçador, Nicolau (POR)

20 January 2014; 18:30	Egypt	27–15	Libya	La Coupole, Algiers; Referees: Akpatsa, Assignon (TOG)
20 January 2014; 18:30	Mahmoud 6	(15–11)	E. Mohamed 7	La Coupole, Algiers; Referees: Akpatsa, Assignon (TOG)
20 January 2014; 18:30	3× (yellow card) 1× (suspension) 1× (red card)	Report	2× (yellow card)	La Coupole, Algiers; Referees: Akpatsa, Assignon (TOG)

21 January 2014; 13:30	Senegal	30–37	Cameroon	Salle Harcha, Algiers; Referees: Allade, Dagba (BEN)
21 January 2014; 13:30	Diaw, Sarr 7	(18–17)	Yamo 9	Salle Harcha, Algiers; Referees: Allade, Dagba (BEN)
21 January 2014; 13:30	3× (yellow card) 1× (suspension)	Report	2× (yellow card) 6× (suspension)	Salle Harcha, Algiers; Referees: Allade, Dagba (BEN)

21 January 2014; 16:15	Gabon	28–26	Libya	La Coupole, Algiers; Referees: Camara, Diakite (GUI)
21 January 2014; 16:15	Mamadou Wora Dia 8	(12–14)	Ali 7	La Coupole, Algiers; Referees: Camara, Diakite (GUI)
21 January 2014; 16:15	4× (yellow card) 4× (suspension) 1× (red card)	Report	3× (yellow card) 3× (suspension)	La Coupole, Algiers; Referees: Camara, Diakite (GUI)

21 January 2014; 20:15	Tunisia	26–20	Egypt	Salle Harcha, Algiers; Referees: Akpatsa, Assignon (TOG)
21 January 2014; 20:15	Boughanmi 8	(15–7)	Hashem 6	Salle Harcha, Algiers; Referees: Akpatsa, Assignon (TOG)
21 January 2014; 20:15	3× (yellow card) 4× (suspension) 1× (red card)	Report	3× (yellow card) 5× (suspension) 1× (red card)	Salle Harcha, Algiers; Referees: Akpatsa, Assignon (TOG)

=== Group B ===
Team	Pld	W	D	L	GF	GA	GD	Pts
Algeria (H)	5	5	0	0	144	93	+51	10
Angola	5	3	0	2	139	122	+17	6
Morocco	5	3	0	2	135	129	+6	6
Congo	5	2	0	3	136	170	−34	4
DR Congo	5	2	0	3	143	141	+2	4
Nigeria	5	0	0	5	118	160	−42	0

(H) Hosts

16 January 2014; 10:00	Congo	36–33	DR Congo	Salle omnisports, Chéraga; Referees: Mohamed, Tamer (EGY)
16 January 2014; 10:00	Taty 8	(17–16)	Bakekolo 8	Salle omnisports, Chéraga; Referees: Mohamed, Tamer (EGY)
16 January 2014; 10:00	3× (yellow card) 7× (suspension) 3× (red card)	Report	3× (yellow card) 5× (suspension)	Salle omnisports, Chéraga; Referees: Mohamed, Tamer (EGY)

16 January 2014; 12:15	Morocco	23–29	Angola	Salle Harcha, Algiers; Referees: Boualloucha, Khenissi (TUN)
16 January 2014; 12:15	Mhais 8	(13–15)	Ferreira, Lopes 7	Salle Harcha, Algiers; Referees: Boualloucha, Khenissi (TUN)
16 January 2014; 12:15	2× (yellow card) 5× (suspension) 1× (red card)	Report	3× (yellow card) 5× (suspension) 1× (red card)	Salle Harcha, Algiers; Referees: Boualloucha, Khenissi (TUN)

16 January 2014; 18:00	Algeria	34–16	Nigeria	Salle Harcha, Algiers; Referees: Coulibaly, Diabate (CIV)
16 January 2014; 18:00	Hamoud 6	(19–8)	S. Aliyu 6	Salle Harcha, Algiers; Referees: Coulibaly, Diabate (CIV)
16 January 2014; 18:00	3× (yellow card) 4× (suspension)	Report	2× (suspension)	Salle Harcha, Algiers; Referees: Coulibaly, Diabate (CIV)

17 January 2014; 14:00	Congo	23–36	Morocco	La Coupole, Algiers; Referees: Caçador, Nicolau (POR)
17 January 2014; 14:00	Angao 7	(12–17)	Idir 11	La Coupole, Algiers; Referees: Caçador, Nicolau (POR)
17 January 2014; 14:00	3× (yellow card) 4× (suspension)	Report	4× (yellow card) 5× (suspension)	La Coupole, Algiers; Referees: Caçador, Nicolau (POR)

17 January 2014; 15:45	Nigeria	19–27	Angola	Salle Harcha, Algiers; Referees: Camara, Diakite (GUI)
17 January 2014; 15:45	Amadi 6	(10–15)	Lopes 6	Salle Harcha, Algiers; Referees: Camara, Diakite (GUI)
17 January 2014; 15:45	2× (yellow card) 2× (suspension)	Report	3× (yellow card) 3× (suspension)	Salle Harcha, Algiers; Referees: Camara, Diakite (GUI)

17 January 2014; 18:00	DR Congo	23–26	Algeria	Salle Harcha, Algiers; Referees: Mohamed, Tamer (EGY)
17 January 2014; 18:00	Tuzolana 5	(9–12)	Berkous 9	Salle Harcha, Algiers; Referees: Mohamed, Tamer (EGY)
17 January 2014; 18:00	3× (yellow card) 5× (suspension)	Report	3× (yellow card) 7× (suspension)	Salle Harcha, Algiers; Referees: Mohamed, Tamer (EGY)

18 January 2014; 14:00	Nigeria	28–32	Congo	La Coupole, Algiers; Referees: Boualloucha, Khenissi (TUN)
18 January 2014; 14:00	B. Aliyu 5	(17–15)	Angao 10	La Coupole, Algiers; Referees: Boualloucha, Khenissi (TUN)
18 January 2014; 14:00	2× (yellow card) 1× (suspension)	Report	3× (yellow card)	La Coupole, Algiers; Referees: Boualloucha, Khenissi (TUN)

18 January 2014; 16:15	Morocco	25–24	DR Congo	La Coupole, Algiers; Referees: Allade, Dagba (BEN)
18 January 2014; 16:15	El Fil 5	(12–12)	Bakekolo 14	La Coupole, Algiers; Referees: Allade, Dagba (BEN)
18 January 2014; 16:15	3× (yellow card) 4× (suspension) 1× (red card)	Report	4× (yellow card) 3× (suspension)	La Coupole, Algiers; Referees: Allade, Dagba (BEN)

18 January 2014; 18:00	Algeria	23–19	Angola	Salle Harcha, Algiers; Referees: Diop, Faye (SEN)
18 January 2014; 18:00	four players 4	(12–8)	Lopes 5	Salle Harcha, Algiers; Referees: Diop, Faye (SEN)
18 January 2014; 18:00	3× (yellow card) 8× (suspension)	Report	2× (yellow card) 5× (suspension)	Salle Harcha, Algiers; Referees: Diop, Faye (SEN)

20 January 2014; 16:15	Angola	26–28	DR Congo	La Coupole, Algiers; Referees: Boualloucha, Khenissi (TUN)
20 January 2014; 16:15	Lopes 6	(13–16)	Bakekolo 8	La Coupole, Algiers; Referees: Boualloucha, Khenissi (TUN)
20 January 2014; 16:15	3× (yellow card) 8× (suspension)	Report	4× (yellow card) 2× (suspension)	La Coupole, Algiers; Referees: Boualloucha, Khenissi (TUN)

20 January 2014; 18:00	Algeria	35–16	Congo	Salle Harcha, Algiers; Referees: Tamer, Mohamed (EGY)
20 January 2014; 18:00	Benali 10	(18–6)	Angao 8	Salle Harcha, Algiers; Referees: Tamer, Mohamed (EGY)
20 January 2014; 18:00	3× (yellow card) 6× (suspension)	Report	3× (yellow card) 2× (suspension)	Salle Harcha, Algiers; Referees: Tamer, Mohamed (EGY)

20 January 2014; 20:15	Morocco	32–27	Nigeria	Salle Harcha, Algiers; Referees: Amba, Tshilanda (COD)
20 January 2014; 20:15	Hicham 5	(15–7)	A. Aliyu 11	Salle Harcha, Algiers; Referees: Amba, Tshilanda (COD)
20 January 2014; 20:15	3× (yellow card) 8× (suspension)	Report	3× (yellow card) 3× (suspension)	Salle Harcha, Algiers; Referees: Amba, Tshilanda (COD)

21 January 2014; 15:45	Angola	38–29	Congo	Salle Harcha, Algiers; Referees: Coulibaly, Diabate (CIV)
21 January 2014; 15:45	Lopes 9	(19–18)	Mboungou 10	Salle Harcha, Algiers; Referees: Coulibaly, Diabate (CIV)
21 January 2014; 15:45	2× (yellow card) 6× (suspension)	Report	1× (yellow card) 5× (suspension)	Salle Harcha, Algiers; Referees: Coulibaly, Diabate (CIV)

21 January 2014; 18:00	Algeria	26–19	Morocco	Salle Harcha, Algiers; Referees: Caçador, Nicolau (POR)
21 January 2014; 18:00	Chehbour 7	(11–11)	Idir 6	Salle Harcha, Algiers; Referees: Caçador, Nicolau (POR)
21 January 2014; 18:00	3× (yellow card) 1× (suspension) 1× (red card)	Report	3× (yellow card) 4× (suspension)	Salle Harcha, Algiers; Referees: Caçador, Nicolau (POR)

21 January 2014; 18:30	DR Congo	35–28	Nigeria	La Coupole, Algiers; Referees: Boualloucha, Khenissi (TUN)
21 January 2014; 18:30	Bakekolo 11	(16–17)	A. Aliyu 10	La Coupole, Algiers; Referees: Boualloucha, Khenissi (TUN)
21 January 2014; 18:30	3× (yellow card) 2× (suspension)	Report	3× (yellow card)	La Coupole, Algiers; Referees: Boualloucha, Khenissi (TUN)

== Knockout stage ==
=== Bracket ===
Quarterfinals
A1	Tunisia	44
B4	Congo	21
A2	Egypt	24
B3	Morocco	15
B2	Angola	24
A3	Cameroon	21
B1	Algeria	44
A4	Senegal	29

Semifinals
A1	Tunisia	22
A2	Egypt	20
B2	Angola	23
B1	Algeria	27

Final
A1	Tunisia	21
B1	Algeria	25
Third place
A2	Egypt	31
B2	Angola	24

5–8th place bracket

5–8th place semifinals
23 January
Congo	20
Morocco	34
23 January
Senegal	24
Cameroon	33

Fifth place game
24 January
Morocco	25
Cameroon	29
Seventh place game
24 January
Congo	36
Senegal	35

=== Quarterfinals ===
22 January 2014; 12:15	Angola	24–21	Cameroon	La Coupole, Algiers; Referees: Mohamed, Tamer (EGY)
22 January 2014; 12:15	Ferreira 9	(12–12)	Yamo 5	La Coupole, Algiers; Referees: Mohamed, Tamer (EGY)
22 January 2014; 12:15	3× (yellow card) 4× (suspension)	Report	3× (yellow card) 7× (suspension)	La Coupole, Algiers; Referees: Mohamed, Tamer (EGY)

22 January 2014; 18:15	Algeria	44–29	Senegal	Salle Harcha, Algiers; Referees: Coulibaly, Diabate (CIV)
22 January 2014; 18:15	Berkous 10	(21–12)	Sarr 9	Salle Harcha, Algiers; Referees: Coulibaly, Diabate (CIV)
22 January 2014; 18:15	2× (yellow card) 5× (suspension)	Report	2× (yellow card) 3× (suspension)	Salle Harcha, Algiers; Referees: Coulibaly, Diabate (CIV)

22 January 2014; 19:00	Egypt	24–15	Morocco	La Coupole, Algiers; Referees: Allade, Dagba (BEN)
22 January 2014; 19:00	Ali Zein 5	(10–6)	Zaroili, Hicham 3	La Coupole, Algiers; Referees: Allade, Dagba (BEN)
22 January 2014; 19:00	3× (yellow card) 2× (suspension)	Report	3× (yellow card) 4× (suspension)	La Coupole, Algiers; Referees: Allade, Dagba (BEN)

22 January 2014; 20:45	Tunisia	44–21	Congo	Salle Harcha, Algiers; Referees: Deche, Ghouarda (ALG)
22 January 2014; 20:45	Boughanmi 12	(23–8)	Taty, Makosso-Tchitembo 5	Salle Harcha, Algiers; Referees: Deche, Ghouarda (ALG)
22 January 2014; 20:45	4× (yellow card) 4× (suspension)	Report	2× (yellow card) 2× (suspension)	Salle Harcha, Algiers; Referees: Deche, Ghouarda (ALG)

=== 5–8th place semifinals ===
23 January 2014; 15:00	Senegal	24–33	Cameroon	Salle Harcha, Algiers; Referees: Benfetima, Benfetima (ALG)
23 January 2014; 15:00	Gomis 5	(12–18)	Bekono, Tchinda 6	Salle Harcha, Algiers; Referees: Benfetima, Benfetima (ALG)
23 January 2014; 15:00	1× (yellow card) 4× (suspension)	Report	3× (yellow card) 2× (suspension)	Salle Harcha, Algiers; Referees: Benfetima, Benfetima (ALG)

23 January 2014; 17:15	Congo	20–34	Morocco	La Coupole, Algiers; Referees: Deche, Ghouarda (ALG)
23 January 2014; 17:15	Nkounkou, Makosso-Tchitembo 4	(10–18)	Zaroili 8	La Coupole, Algiers; Referees: Deche, Ghouarda (ALG)
23 January 2014; 17:15	3× (yellow card) 2× (suspension)	Report	3× (yellow card) 3× (suspension)	La Coupole, Algiers; Referees: Deche, Ghouarda (ALG)

=== Semifinals ===
24 January 2014; 16:00	Tunisia	22–20	Egypt	Salle Harcha, Algiers; Referees: Caçador, Nicolau (POR)
24 January 2014; 16:00	Toumi 7	(10–12)	Hashem 7	Salle Harcha, Algiers; Referees: Caçador, Nicolau (POR)
24 January 2014; 16:00	3× (yellow card) 4× (suspension)	Report	3× (yellow card) 6× (suspension)	Salle Harcha, Algiers; Referees: Caçador, Nicolau (POR)

24 January 2014; 18:15	Algeria	27–23	Angola	Salle Harcha, Algiers; Referees: Akpatsa, Assignon (TOG)
24 January 2014; 18:15	Berkous 9	(13–11)	Ferreira 7	Salle Harcha, Algiers; Referees: Akpatsa, Assignon (TOG)
24 January 2014; 18:15	2× (yellow card) 3× (suspension)	Report	2× (yellow card) 2× (suspension)	Salle Harcha, Algiers; Referees: Akpatsa, Assignon (TOG)

=== Eleventh place game ===
23 January 2014; 17:15	Libya	25–26	Nigeria	Salle omnisports, Chéraga
23 January 2014; 17:15		(11–13)		Salle omnisports, Chéraga

=== Ninth place game ===
23 January 2014; 15:00	Gabon	23–22	DR Congo	Salle omnisports, Chéraga
23 January 2014; 15:00		(10–10)		Salle omnisports, Chéraga

=== Seventh place game ===
24 January 2014; 11:00	Congo	36–35	Senegal	La Coupole, Algiers; Referees: Benfetima, Benfetima (ALG)
24 January 2014; 11:00	Angao 13	(22–16)	Sall, Sarr 7	La Coupole, Algiers; Referees: Benfetima, Benfetima (ALG)
24 January 2014; 11:00	3× (yellow card) 3× (suspension)	Report	3× (yellow card) 2× (suspension)	La Coupole, Algiers; Referees: Benfetima, Benfetima (ALG)

=== Fifth place game ===
24 January 2014; 15:00	Morocco	25–29	Cameroon	La Coupole, Algiers; Referees: Diop, Faye (SEN)
24 January 2014; 15:00	Idir 8	(17–13)	Fankwa 5	La Coupole, Algiers; Referees: Diop, Faye (SEN)
24 January 2014; 15:00	3× (yellow card) 2× (suspension)	Report	2× (yellow card) 9× (suspension)	La Coupole, Algiers; Referees: Diop, Faye (SEN)

=== Third place game ===
25 January 2014; 13:45	Egypt	31–24	Angola	Salle Harcha, Algiers; Referees: Caçador, Nicolau (POR)
25 January 2014; 13:45	Zein 10	(19–12)	Pestana, Kamuanga 5	Salle Harcha, Algiers; Referees: Caçador, Nicolau (POR)
25 January 2014; 13:45	3× (yellow card) 2× (suspension)	Report	3× (yellow card) 5× (suspension)	Salle Harcha, Algiers; Referees: Caçador, Nicolau (POR)

=== Final ===
25 January 2014; 18:15	Algeria	25–21	Tunisia	Salle Harcha, Algiers; Referees: Coulibaly, Diabate (CIV)
25 January 2014; 18:15	Berkous, Chehbour 6	(12–11)	Tej 4	Salle Harcha, Algiers; Referees: Coulibaly, Diabate (CIV)
25 January 2014; 18:15	3× (yellow card) 2× (suspension)	Report	4× (yellow card) 3× (suspension)	Salle Harcha, Algiers; Referees: Coulibaly, Diabate (CIV)

== Ranking and statistics ==
=== Final ranking ===
Qualified for the 2015 World Championship

Rank	Team
Gold medal	Algeria
Silver medal	Tunisia
Bronze medal	Egypt
4	Angola
5	Cameroon
6	Morocco
7	Congo
8	Senegal
9	Gabon
10	DR Congo
11	Nigeria
12	Libya

=== All Star Team ===
The All-star team and award winners were announced

Position	Player
Goalkeeper	Abdelmalek Slahdji (ALG)
Right wing	Aymen Toumi (TUN)
Right back	Sassi Boultif (ALG)
Central back	Abdelkader Rahim (ALG)
Left back	Selim Hedoui (TUN)
Left wing	Riad Chehbour (ALG)
Pivot	Mohamed Mokrani (ALG)

=== Other awards ===
Award	Player
Most Valuable Player	Messaoud Berkous (ALG)
Topscorer	Messaoud Berkous (ALG) (44 goals)

== See also ==
- 2014 African Women's Handball Championship
