= Tiago Pereira =

Tiago Pereira may refer to:

- Tiago Pereira (footballer, born 1975), Portuguese football defensive midfielder
- Tiago Pereira (footballer, born 1990), Portuguese football forward
- Tiago Lima Pereira (born 1994), Portuguese football defender
- Tiago Pereira (footballer, born 1995), Portuguese football goalkeeper
- Tiago Pereira (athlete) (born 1993), Portuguese triple jumper
- Tiago Pereira (handballer) (born 1989), Portuguese handball player
- Tiago Pereira (tennis), Portuguese tennis player
- T. J. Pereira (born 1976), Brazilian jockey

== See also ==
- Thiago Pereira (born 1986), Brazilian swimmer
- Thiago Pereira (footballer) (born 1984), Brazilian football defender
