= Ali Zein =

Egyptian handball player

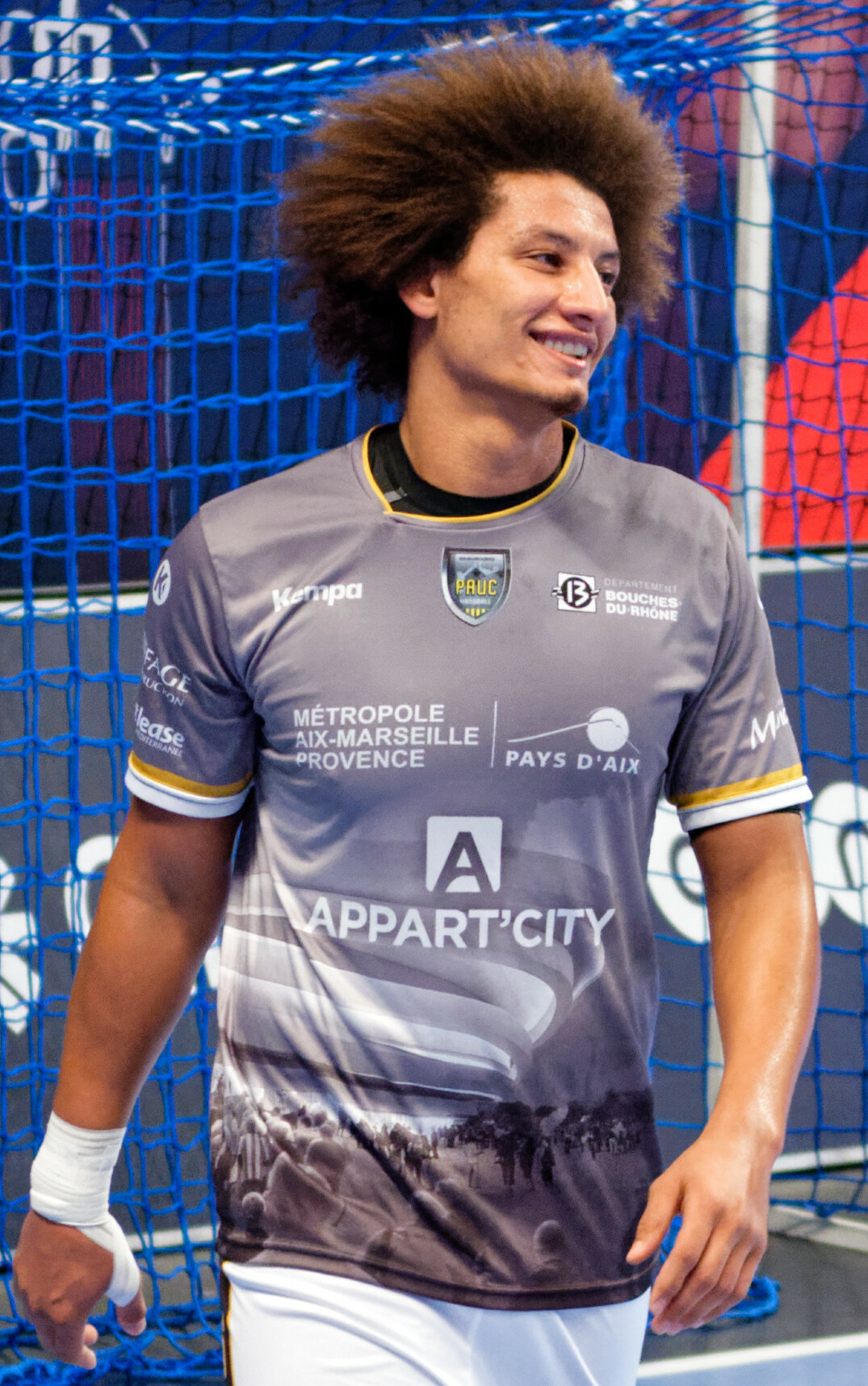
- Zein in 2016

Personal information
- Full name: Ali Zein Mohamed al-Hawwari
- Nationality: Egyptian
- Born: 14 December 1990 (age 35) Abu Mina', Qena Governorate, Egypt
- Height: 1.95 m (6 ft 5 in)

Sport
- Sport: Handball
- Position: Left back
- Current club: ONE Veszprém
- Number: 90

Youth career
- Years: Team
- 1996–2008: Al Ahly

Senior clubs
- Years: Team
- 2008–2013: Al Ahly
- 2013–2014: Étoile Sportive du Sahel
- 2014–2016: Al Jazira Club
- 2016–2018: Pays d'Aix UC
- 2018–2021: Sharjah Sports Club
- 2020: → Al Ahly (loan)
- 2021–2022: FC Barcelona
- 2022–2025: Dinamo București
- 2023: → Al Ahly (loan)
- 2025: → Al Ahly (loan)
- 2025–: ONE Veszprém
National team
Years	Team	Apps	(Gls)
2011–	Egypt	323	(508)
Medal record
African Championship
Gold medal – first place	2016 Egypt
Gold medal – first place	2020 Tunisia
Gold medal – first place	2022 Egypt
Gold medal – first place	2024 Egypt
Gold medal – first place	2026 Rwanda
Silver medal – second place	2018 Gabon
Mediterranean Games
Gold medal – first place	2013 Mersin	Team

Ali Zein Mohamed al-Hawwari (Arabic: علي زين محمد الهواري; born 14 December 1990) is an Egyptian handball player for Hungarian side Veszprém KC and the Egyptian national team.

== Club career ==
Zein was born in Abu Mina', Qena Governorate, hailing from the Hawwara tribe. He started his career at Al Ahly in 1996–97, then he played for Étoile Sportive du Sahel, Al Jazira Club, Pays d'Aix Université Club and Sharjah Sports Club, before joining Barcelona in July 2021, where he won the 2021–22 EHF Champions League. After one season he transferred to Dinamo București.

== International career ==
He played for Egypt U20 at the 2009 Junior World Championship and 2011 Junior World Championship.

He won the 2013 Mediterranean Games, and the African Championship in 2016, 2020, 2022 and 2024 with Egypt. He also represented Egypt at the World Men's Handball Championship in 2013, 2015, 2019, 2021, 2023 and 2025. In addition, he competed in the 2016, 2020 and 2024 Summer Olympics.

== Honours ==
Club

Al Ahly

- Egypt Handball Cup: 2009
- Arab Handball Championship of Champions: 2010
- African Handball Champions League: 2012
- Egyptian Handball League: 2012–13
- African Handball Cup Winners' Cup: 2013

Étoile du Sahel

- Tunisian Handball Cup: 2013–14

Al Jazira

- UAE Handball League: 2015–16
- UAE President's Handball Cup: 2015–16

Sharjah

- UAE Handball League: 2018–19, 2019–20, 2020–21
- UAE President's Handball Cup: 2018–19, 2019–20, 2020–21

Barcelona

- EHF Champions League: 2021–22
- Liga ASOBAL: 2021–22
- Copa del Rey: 2021–22
- Copa ASOBAL: 2021–22
- Supercopa ASOBAL: 2021–22

Dinamo București

- Liga Națională: 2023, 2024, 2025
- Romanian Cup: 2024, 2025
- Romanian Super Cup: 2022, 2023, 2024

Veszprém KC

- Nemzeti Bajnokság I: 2025–26
- Magyar Kupa: 2025–26
- Super Globe: 2026

International

Egypt

- Mediterranean Games: 2013
- African Championship: 2016, 2020, 2022, 2024, 2026

Individual

- Best Player at the 2018 African Championship
- Best Left Back at the 2020 African Championship
- Best Left Back at the 2022 African Championship
