= Boomhouwer =

Boomhouwer is a Dutch surname. Notable people with the surname include:

- Jeffrey Boomhouwer (born 1988), Dutch handball player
- Sanne Boomhouwer or Susana (born 1984), Dutch trance music vocalist

== See also ==
• Boomhauer, a fictional character from King of the Hill
