= United Arab Emirates Men's Handball League =

- Founded: 1976
- Country: United Arab Emirates
- Confederation: AHF
- Number of clubs: 11
- Level on pyramid: 1
- Domestic cup(s): President's Cup; UAE Crown Prince Cup; UAE Federation Cup
- International cup: Asian Club League Handball Championship
- Current champions: Al-Sharjah SCC (18th title) (2023–24)
- Most championships: Al-Sharjah SCC (18 titles)
- Broadcaster(s): Abu Dhabi Sports, Dubai Sports
- Website: www.uaehandball.com

The UAE Handball League is the top professional handball league in the United Arab Emirates (UAE). The first team to win the title was Al-Sharjah. Al-Sharjah SCC has the record with 15 league titles to their name. Ten clubs compete in the League that operates on a system of 1 Level.

The League was founded in 1976 as the UAE Handball League. The first 1976–77 season was won by Al-Sharjah.

== Member clubs (2023–24) ==
UAE Handball League
Club	Location
Al Ahli	Dubai
Al Ain	Al Ain
Al Dhafra	Madinat Zayed
Al Jazira	Abu Dhabi
Al Nasr	Dubai
Al Sharjah	Sharjah
Al Wahda	Abu Dhabi
Al Wasl	Dubai
Bani Yas	Abu Dhabi
Dibba Al-Hisn Sports Club	Dibba Al-Hisn
Maliha	Maliha

== List of champions ==
- 1976–77: Al-Sharjah
- 1977–78: Al-Sharjah
- 1978–79: Al-Ain
- 1979–80: Al-Sharjah
- 1980–81: Al-Ain
- 1981–82: Al-Ain
- 1982–83: Al-Wasl
- 1983–84: Al-Wasl
- 1984–85: Al-Wasl
- 1985–86: Al-Ahli
- 1986–87: Al-Wasl
- 1987–88: Al-Ahli
- 1988–89: Al-Wasl
- 1989–90: Al-Shabab
- 1990–91: Not completed due to Gulf War
- 1991–92: Al-Sharjah
- 1992–93: Al-Sharjah
- 1993–94: Al-Ain
- 1994–95: Al-Sharjah
- 1995–96: Al-Ahli
- 1996–97: Al Jazira
- 1997–98: Al-Ahli
- 1998–99: Al-Sharjah
- 1999–2000: Al-Sharjah
- 2000–01: Al-Nasr
- 2001–02: Al-Sharjah
- 2002–03: Al-Nasr
- 2003–04: Al-Nasr
- 2004–05: Al-Ahli
- 2005–06: Al-Sharjah
- 2006–07: Al-Ahli
- 2007–08: Al-Nasr
- 2008–09: Al-Wasl
- 2009–10: Al-Wasl
- 2010–11: Al-Ahli
- 2011–12: Al-Ahli
- 2012–13: Al-Ahli
- 2013–14: Al-Nasr
- 2014–15: Al-Ahli
- 2015–16: Al Jazira
- 2016–17: Al-Sharjah
- 2017–18: Al-Sharjah
- 2018–19: Al-Sharjah
- 2019–20: Al-Sharjah
- 2020–21: Al-Sharjah
- 2021–22: Al-Sharjah
- 2022–23: Al-Sharjah
- 2023–24: Al-Sharjah
- 2024–25: Al-Sharjah

== Champions ==
=== Performance by club ===
Club	Winners	Winning seasons
Al-Sharjah	18	1976–77, 1977–78, 1979–80, 1991–92, 1992–93, 1994–95, 1998–99, 1999–2000, 2001–02, 2005–06, 2016–17, 2017–18, 2018–19, 2019–20, 2020–21, 2021–22, 2022–23, 2023–24
Al-Ahli	10	1985–86, 1987–88, 1995–96, 1997–98, 2004–05, 2006–07, 2010–11, 2011–12, 2012–13, 2014–15
Al-Wasl	7	1982–83, 1983–84, 1984–85, 1986–87, 1988–89, 2008–09, 2009–10
Al-Nasr	5	2000–01, 2002–03, 2003–04, 2007–08, 2013–14
Al-Ain	4	1978–79, 1980–81, 1981–82, 1993–94
Al Jazira	2	1996–97, 2015–16
Al-Shabab	1	1989–90
