= Riad Chehbour =

Algerian handball player (born 1985)

Personal information
- Nationality: Algerian
- Born: 28 July 1985 (age 41) Algiers, Algeria
- Height: 1.82 m (6 ft 0 in)

Sport
- Sport: Handball
- Position: Left wing
- Current club: GS pétroliers/MC Alger

Senior clubs
- Years: Team
- 2004-: GS pétroliers/MC Alger
National team
Years	Team	Apps	(Gls)
2005-2021	Algeria	155	(360)

Riad Chehbour (born 28 July 1985) is an Algerian handball player for MC Alger.

He participated in four World Championships (2009, 2013, 2015, 2021).

He also won 5 five medals at African Championships: gold in 2014, silver in 2012, bronze in 2008, 2010 and 2020.
