= Ólafur Gústafsson =

Icelandic handball player (born 1989)

Personal information
- Nationality: Icelandic
- Born: 27 March 1989 (age 37) Horsens, Denmark
- Height: 1.98 m (6 ft 6 in)

Sport
- Sport: Handball
- Position: Left back
- Current club: KA

Senior clubs
- Years: Team
- 2006–2012: FH
- 2012–2014: SG Flensburg-Handewitt
- 2014–2016: Aalborg Håndbold
- 2016–2017: UMF Stjarnan
- 2017–2020: KIF Kolding
- 2020–2024: KA
National team
Years	Team	Apps	(Gls)
–	Iceland	43	(48)
- Updated on 9 October 2020

Ólafur Gústafsson (born 27 March 1989) is an Icelandic handball player for KA Akureyri and the Icelandic national team.

He competed at the 2013 World Men's Handball Championship.
