= Fábio Magalhães =

Portuguese handball player (born 1988)

Personal information
- Full name: Fábio Ramos Magalhães
- Nationality: Portuguese
- Born: 12 March 1988 (age 38) Lisbon, Portugal
- Height: 1.94 m (6 ft 4 in)

Sport
- Sport: Handball
- Position: Left back
- Current club: ABC Braga
- Number: 88

Senior clubs
- Years: Team
- 2005–2009: ABC Braga
- 2009–2016: Sporting CP
- 2016–2017: Madeira SAD
- 2017–2018: Chartres
- 2018–2025: FC Porto
National team
Years	Team	Apps	(Gls)
2006-	Portugal	194	(363)
- Updated on 26 July 2025

Fábio Ramos Magalhães (pronounced [ˈfaβju mɐɣɐˈʎɐ̃jʃ]; born 12 March 1988) is a Portuguese handball player for ABC Braga (handball) and the Portuguese national team.

He represented Portugal at the 2020 European Men's Handball Championship. In 2025 he was part of the Portugal team that reached the semifinals of the World Championship for the first time in history. They lost the semifinals to Denmark and the third place playoff to France. At the 2026 European Men's Handball Championship he was part of the Portugal team that got 5th place, their best ever finish at a European Championship.
