= Messaoud Berkous =

Algerian handball player (born 1989)

Personal information
- Nationality: Algerian
- Born: 20 July 1989 (age 37) Bethioua, Algeria
- Height: 1.92 m (6 ft 4 in)

Sport
- Sport: Handball
- Position: Left back/ center back
- Current club: Al Arabi

Youth career
- Years: Team
- –2007: JPA Aïn El Bia

Senior clubs
- Years: Team
- 2007–2013: MC Alger / GS Pétroliers
- 2013: →Al Sadd (loan)
- 2013–2014: GS Pétroliers
- 2014: →Al-Qurain (loan)
- 2015–2017: GS Pétroliers
- 2017: →Zamalek SC (loan)
- 2018: →CS Sakiet Ezzit (loan)
- 2018–2020: GS Pétroliers
- 2021–2023: Istres
- 2023–2024: Dijon MH
- 2024–: Al Arabi
National team
Years	Team	Apps	(Gls)
2007–	Algeria	175	(763)
Medal record
African Championship
Gold medal – first place	2014 Algeria
Silver medal – second place	2012 Morocco
Silver medal – second place	2024 Egypt
Bronze medal – third place	2008 Angola
Bronze medal – third place	2010 Egypt
Bronze medal – third place	2020 Tunisia
Mediterranean Games
Bronze medal – third place	2026 Taranto	Team

Messaoud Berkous (Arabic: مسعود بركوس, born 20 July 1989) is an Algerian handball player for the Qatari club Al Arabi.

== Career ==
Messaoud Berkous started his career with JPA Aïn El Bia in the town of Aïn Bya, Oran Province.
