= Tiago Pereira (footballer, born 1990) =

Portuguese footballer

Personal information
- Full name: Tiago Alexandre Martins da Cruz Pereira
- Date of birth: 6 February 1990 (age 36)
- Place of birth: Lisbon, Portugal
- Height: 1.87 m (6 ft 2 in)
- Position: Forward

Team information
- Current team: AC Malveira

Youth career
- 1999–2000: Ben. Montemor
- 2001–2009: Loures

Senior career*
Years	Team	Apps	(Gls)
2009–2012	Loures		
2012	Murteirense	14	(9)
2013	Padroense	3	(1)
2013	Atlético CP	2	(0)
2014	Loures	15	(3)
2014–2016	Benfica e Castelo Branco	41	(6)
2016	Loures	11	(1)
2016–2017	Torreense	25	(1)
2017–2018	Peniche	25	(17)
2018	Alverca	9	(1)
2018–	Malveira	16	(0)
- * Club domestic league appearances and goals

Tiago Alexandre Martins da Cruz Pereira (born 6 February 1990) is a Portuguese football player who plays as a forward for Malveira.

== Club career ==
Born in Lisbon, Pereira spent most of his youth career with G.S. Loures, where he made his senior debut in the Lisbon Football Association's first district league in 2009–10. After a spell with G.S.R. Murteirense in the same competition in 2012, he entered the national leagues the following March with Padroense F.C. in the third tier.

After three games and a goal for Padroense, Pereira joined Segunda Liga club Atlético CP. He made his professional debut on 17 November 2013 in a 3–0 loss at Académico de Viseu as a half-time substitute for João Mário, and made one more appearance off the bench before returning to Loures, now in the third tier. He then had two seasons with Sport Benfica e Castelo Branco in the same division.

After playing 2016–17 with S.C.U. Torreense, Pereira dropped back to the district leagues with G.D. Peniche of the Leiria Football Association before signing with F.C. Alverca in the third tier in June 2018. In November that year, he switched to A.C. Malveira in his home district's league.
