= Anton Prakapenia =

Belarusian handball player

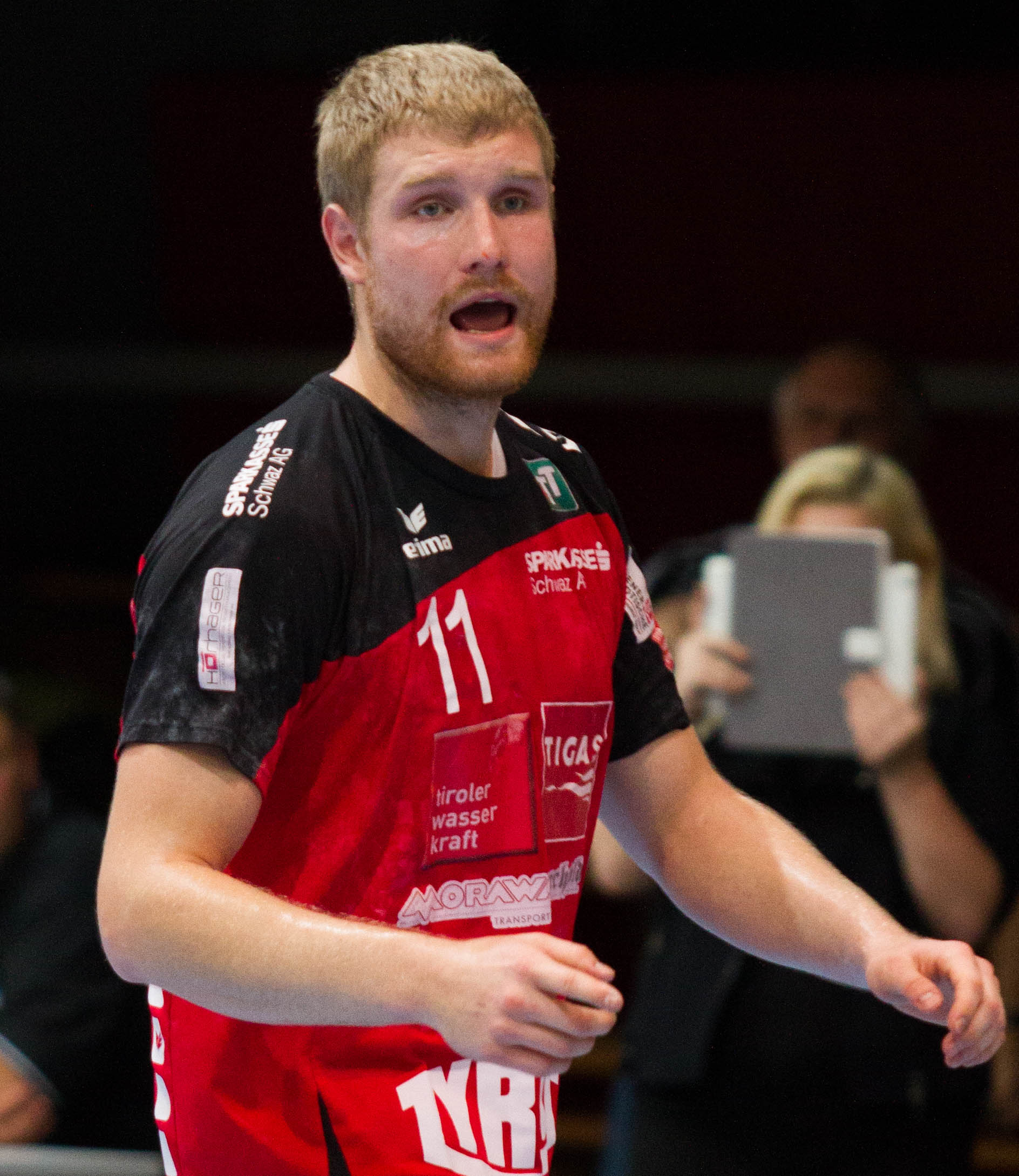

Personal information
- Nationality: Belarusian
- Born: 26 September 1988 (age 38) Gomel, Belarus
- Height: 1.95 m (6 ft 5 in)

Sport
- Sport: Handball
- Position: Left back
- Current club: HIB Graz

Senior clubs
- Years: Team
- –2009: HC Meshkov Brest
- 2009–2010: HC Dinamo Minsk
- 2010–2013: HC Meshkov Brest
- 2013–2014: SPR Chrobry Głogów
- 2014–2018: Handball Tirol
- 2018–2019: HSC 2000 Coburg
- 2019–2021: HSG Nordhorn-Lingen
- 2021–2022: GC Amicitia Zürich
- 2022–2024: HSG Bärnbach-Köflach
- 2022–2024: HIB Graz
National team
Years	Team	Apps	(Gls)
–	Belarus	32	(63)
- Updated on 20 July 2022

Anton Prakapenia (born 26 September 1988) is a Belarusian handball player. He plays for the Austrian club HIB Graz and the Belarusian national team.

He competed at the 2016 European Men's Handball Championship.
