= Abdoulaye Sarr =

Senegalese footballer and coach

Abdoulaye Sarr (born 31 October 1951 in Senegal) is the former coach of the Senegal national team.

== Playing career ==
Began his career in 1972 with Stade Mbour in his native Senegal, before moving onto Seib Diourbel. Finished his career in 1982. It was an attacking midfielder.

== Coaching career ==
Start coaching at Stade Mbour, where in six years he reached in Senegal FA Cup semifinals.

From 1995 to 2005 was assistant coach of Senegal national team, working with Peter Schnittger, Bruno Metsu and Guy Stéphan. From 1 July 2005 to 13 May 2006 he was coach of Senegal.

After coaching Senegal he returned to Stade Mbour.
