= Patrick Groetzki =

German handball player (born 1989)

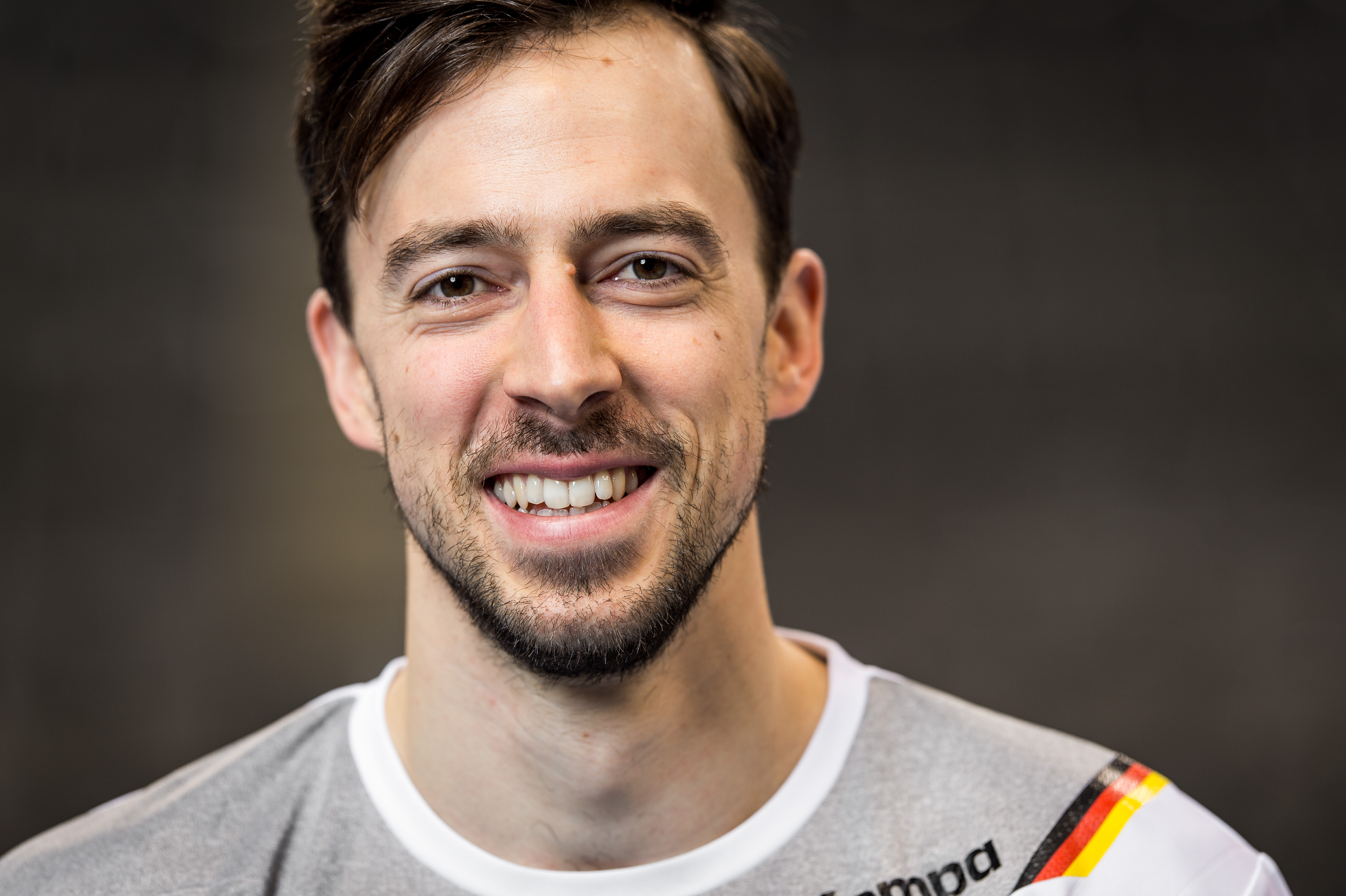
- Groetzki in 2018

Personal information
- Nationality: German
- Born: 4 July 1989 (age 37) Pforzheim, West Germany
- Height: 1.89 m (6 ft 2 in)

Sport
- Sport: Handball
- Position: Right wing
- Current club: Rhein-Neckar Löwen
- Number: 24

Youth career
- Years: Team
- 1994–2007: SG Pforzheim/Eutingen
- 2007: Rhein-Neckar Löwen

Senior clubs
- Years: Team
- 2007–: Rhein-Neckar Löwen
National team
| Years | Team | Apps | (Gls) |
| 2009– | Germany | 143 | (366) |
Medal record
Olympic Games
| Bronze medal – third place | 2016 Rio de Janeiro | Team |

Patrick Groetzki (born 4 July 1989) is a German handballer for Rhein-Neckar Löwen and the Germany national team.

He made his debut on 17 June 2009 against Belarus.

== Achievements ==
- Summer Olympics:
  - Bronze: 2016
- Junior World Championship:
  - Winner: 2009
- EHF European League:
  - Winner: 2013
