= Tiago Pereira (handballer) =

Portuguese handball player (born 1989)

Personal information
- Full name: Tiago Monteiro Pereira
- Nationality: Portuguese
- Born: 8 June 1989 (age 37) Guimarães, Portugal
- Height: 1.87 m (6 ft 2 in)

Sport
- Sport: Handball
- Position: Middle Back
- Current club: Sélestat Alsace

Youth career
- Years: Team
- 2002–2006: ABC Braga

Senior clubs
- Years: Team
- 2006–2012: ABC Braga
- 2012–2017: Benfica
- 2017–: Sélestat Alsace
National team
Years	Team	Apps
2011–	Portugal	15

Tiago Monteiro Pereira (born 8 June 1989) is a Portuguese handballer who plays for Sélestat Alsace and the Portugal national team.

== Career ==
Born in Guimarães, Pereira is a youth product of ABC Braga academy, and made his debut in the first tier in the 2006–07 season, as the Northern side conquer their twelfth title. In his following two years, he help the club add back-to-back, Portuguese Cup wins.

A student enrolled in University of Minho, he competed in the 21st World University Championship, taking part in Portuguese campaign that finished runner-up to Czech Republic, while individually, he won the Most Valuable Player award for the tournament.

Shortly after the tournament, Pereira moved to Benfica, reuniting with former coach, Jorge Rito and helping the club to a Super Cup conquest in his first year. After several seasons without silverware, he guided his team to a fifth Portuguese Handball Cup win in April 2016, after beating Sporting by 36–35. He also helped them reach the play-off finals of the Andebol 1 league and the EHF Challenge Cup Final, losing both to ABC Braga. In his fifth year at Benfica, Pereira won his second Super Cup, scoring once in a 25–24 win over ABC Braga. It was his final season at the club, as he signed a two-year deal with Sélestat Alsace on 4 May 2017.

== Honours ==
ABC Braga

- Portuguese First Division: 2006–07
- Portuguese Cup: 2007–08, 2008–09

Benfica

- Portuguese Handball Cup: 2015–16
- Portuguese Super Cup: 2012, 2016
