= Mohamed Hashem =

Egyptian handball player (born 1988)

Personal information
- Full name: Mohamed Alaa Hashem
- Nationality: Egyptian
- Born: 23 January 1988 (age 38)
- Height: 1.78 m (5 ft 10 in)

Sport
- Sport: Handball
- Position: Centre back
- Current club: Aviation SC
National team
Years	Team	Apps	(Gls)
–	Egypt	210	(712)
Medal record
African Championship
Gold medal – first place	2022 Egypt

Mohamed Alaa Hashem (born 23 January 1988) is an Egyptian handball player for Aviation SC and the Egyptian national team.
