= UAE President's Handball Cup =

UAE President Handball Cup
- Founded: 1977
- Country: United Arab Emirates
- Number of clubs: 14
- Current champions: Al-Sharjah (10th title)
- Most championships: Al-Sharjah (10 titles)
- Website: http://www.uaehandball.com
- Current: 2021–22 UAE President's Cup

The UAE President's Handball Cup is a professional Handball tournament that takes place in the United Arab Emirates. Founded in 1977, the inaugural champion was Al Wasl, although Al-Sharjah has taken the trophy the most times of any club, prevailing 10 times.

== Champions ==
=== Performance by club ===
Club	Winners
Al-Sharjah	10
Al-Wasl	7
Al-Ahli	7
Al-Shabab	6
Al-Jazira	6
Al-Ain	5
Al-Nasr	4

== List of champions ==
- 1977–78: Al-Wasl
- 1978–79: Al-Wasl
- 1979–80: Al-Ain
- 1980–81: Al-Sharjah
- 1981–82: Al-Ain
- 1982–83: Al-Wasl
- 1983–84: Al-Wasl
- 1984–85: Al-Wasl
- 1985–86: Al-Sharjah
- 1986–87: Al-Ahli
- 1987–88: Al-Shabab
- 1988–89: Al-Ain
- 1989–90: Al-Ahli
- 1990–91: Al Jazira
- 1991–92: Al-Sharjah
- 1992–93: Al-Wasl
- 1993–94: Al-Shabab
- 1994–95: Al Jazira
- 1995–96: Al-Sharjah
- 1996–97: Al-Shabab
- 1997–98: Al Jazira
- 1998–99: Al-Nasr Dubai SC
- 1999–00: Al-Ahli
- 2000–01: Al-Shabab
- 2001–02: Al-Shabab
- 2002–03: Al-Ahli
- 2003–04: Al-Nasr Dubai SC
- 2004–05: Al-Ain
- 2005-06: Al-Ain
- 2006-07: Al-Wasl
- 2007-08: Al-Sharjah
- 2008–09: Al-Sharjah
- 2009–10: Al-Shabab
- 2010–11: Al Jazira
- 2011–12: Al-Ahli
- 2012–13: Al-Nasr Dubai SC
- 2013–14: Al Jazira
- 2014–15: Al-Nasr Dubai SC
- 2015–16: Al Jazira
- 2016–17: Al-Ahli
- 2017–18: Al-Ahli
- 2018–19: Al-Sharjah
- 2019–20: Al-Sharjah
- 2020–21: Al-Sharjah
- 2021–22: Al-Sharjah
