= Jeffrey Boomhouwer =

Dutch handball player (born 1988)

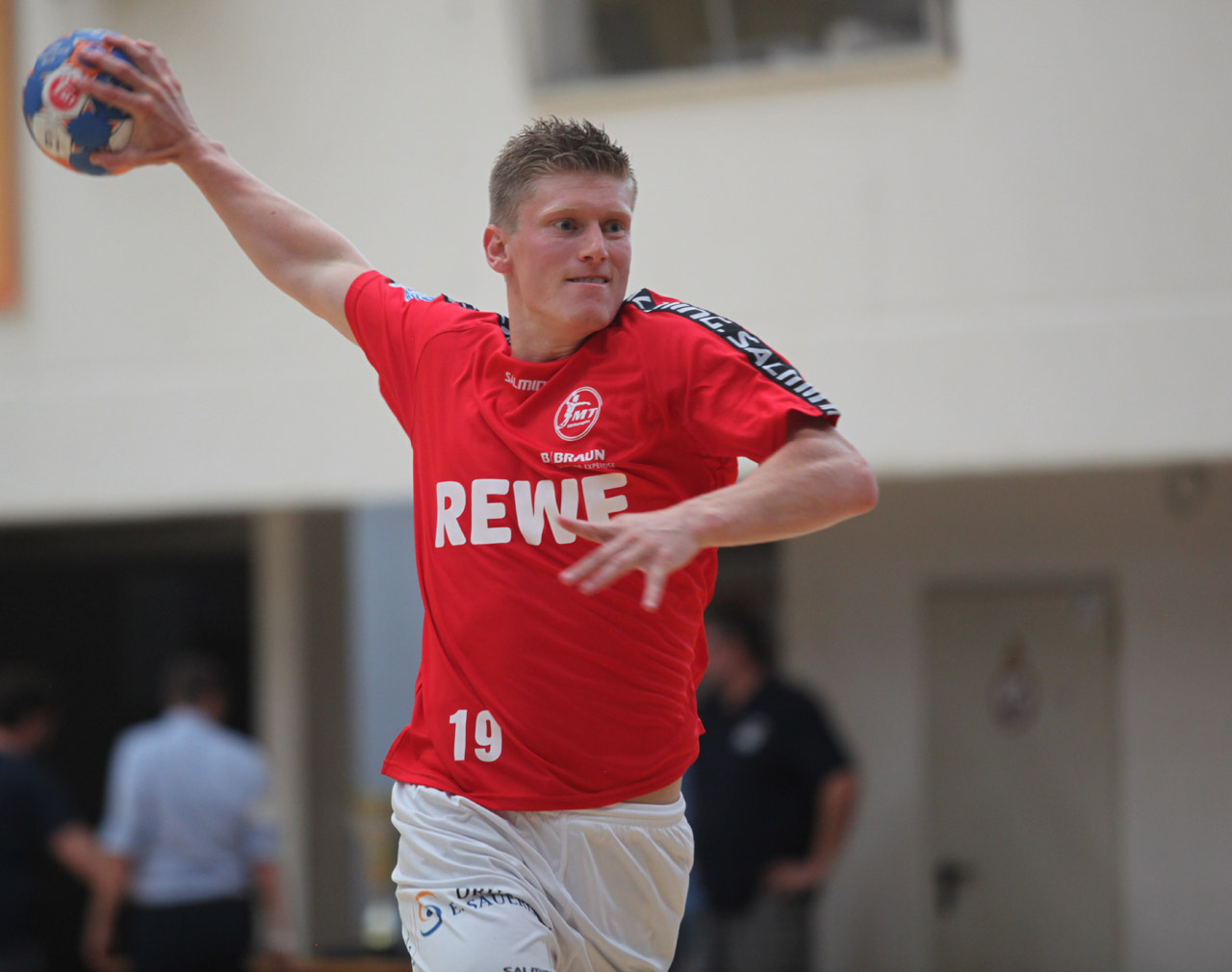

Personal information
- Nationality: Dutch
- Born: 15 June 1988 (age 38) Amsterdam, Netherlands
- Height: 1.80 m (5 ft 11 in)

Sport
- Sport: Handball
- Position: Left wing
- Current club: HV Aalsmeer

Senior clubs
- Years: Team
- –2010: HV Aalsmeer
- 2010–2014: TV Emsdetten
- 2014–2018: MT Melsungen
- 2018–2022: Bergischer HC
- 2022–: HV Aalsmeer
National team
Years	Team	Apps	(Gls)
2009-	Netherlands	93	(229)
- Updated on 28 December 2022

Jeffrey Boomhouwer (born 15 June 1988) is a Dutch handball player for HV Aalsmeer and the Dutch national team.

He represented the Netherlands at the 2020 European Men's Handball Championship.
