= 2025 World Men's Handball Championship qualification =

Tournament details
- Dates: 21 February 2023 – 12 May 2024
- Teams: 83 (from 6 confederations)

The 2025 World Men's Handball Championship qualification decided who qualified for the 2025 World Men's Handball Championship in Croatia, Denmark and Norway. Qualifying occurred between February 2023 and May 2024. The championship will feature 32 teams for the third time.

== Qualified teams ==
Team qualified Team failed to qualify Team withdrew or suspended Did not enter

Country	Qualified as	Qualified on	Previous appearances^{1}
Croatia	Co-host	28 February 2020	15 (1995, 1997, 1999, 2001, **2003**, 2005, 2007, 2009, 2011, 2013, 2015, 2017, 2019, 2021, 2023)
Denmark	Co-host	28 February 2020	25 (1938, 1954, 1958, 1961, 1964, 1967, 1970, 1974, 1978, 1982, 1986, 1993, 1995, 1999, 2003, 2005, 2007, 2009, 2011, 2013, 2015, 2017, **2019**, **2021**, **2023**)
Norway	Co-host	28 February 2020	17 (1958, 1961, 1964, 1967, 1970, 1993, 1997, 1999, 2001, 2005, 2007, 2009, 2011, 2017, 2019, 2021, 2023)
United States	Wildcard	18 October 2018	7 (1964, 1970, 1974, 1993, 1995, 2001, 2023)
Brazil	Top three at 2024 South and Central American Championship	18 January 2024	16 (1958, 1995, 1997, 1999, 2001, 2003, 2005, 2007, 2009, 2011, 2013, 2015, 2017, 2019, 2021, 2023)
Japan	Semifinalist at 2024 Asian Championship	19 January 2024	15 (1961, 1964, 1967, 1970, 1974, 1978, 1982, 1990, 1995, 1997, 2005, 2011, 2017, 2019, 2021)
Qatar	Semifinalist at 2024 Asian Championship	19 January 2024	9 (2003, 2005, 2007, 2013, 2015, 2017, 2019, 2021, 2023)
Argentina	Top three at 2024 South and Central American Championship	19 January 2024	14 (1997, 1999, 2001, 2003, 2005, 2007, 2009, 2011, 2013, 2015, 2017, 2019, 2021, 2023)
Chile	Top three at 2024 South and Central American Championship	19 January 2024	7 (2011, 2013, 2015, 2017, 2019, 2021, 2023)
Kuwait	Semifinalist at 2024 Asian Championship	21 January 2024	8 (1982, 1995, 1999, 2001, 2003, 2005, 2007, 2009)
Bahrain	Semifinalist at 2024 Asian Championship	21 January 2024	5 (2011, 2017, 2019, 2021, 2023)
Sweden	Semifinalist at 2024 European Championship	21 January 2024	26 (1938, **1954**, **1958**, 1961, 1964, 1967, 1970, 1974, 1978, 1982, 1986, **1990**, 1993, 1995, 1997, **1999**, 2001, 2003, 2005, 2009, 2011, 2015, 2017, 2019, 2021, 2023)
France	Semifinalist at 2024 European Championship	22 January 2024	24 (1954, 1958, 1961, 1964, 1967, 1970, 1978, 1990, 1993, **1995**, 1997, 1999, **2001**, 2003, 2005, 2007, **2009**, **2011**, 2013, **2015**, **2017**, 2019, 2021, 2023)
Cape Verde	Top five at 2024 African Championship	23 January 2024	2 (2021, 2023)
Algeria	Top five at 2024 African Championship	23 January 2024	16 (1974, 1982, 1986, 1990, 1995, 1997, 1999, 2001, 2003, 2005, 2009, 2011, 2013, 2015, 2021, 2023)
Egypt	Top five at 2024 African Championship	23 January 2024	17 (1964, 1993, 1995, 1997, 1999, 2001, 2003, 2005, 2007, 2009, 2011, 2013, 2015, 2017, 2019, 2021, 2023)
Tunisia	Top five at 2024 African Championship	23 January 2024	16 (1967, 1995, 1997, 1999, 2001, 2003, 2005, 2007, 2009, 2011, 2013, 2015, 2017, 2019, 2021, 2023)
Germany	Semifinalist at 2024 European Championship	24 January 2024	27 (**1938**, 1954, 1958, 1961, 1964, 1967, 1970, 1974, **1978**, 1982, 1986, 1990^{2}, 1993, 1995, 1999, 2001, 2003, 2005, **2007**, 2009, 2011, 2013, 2015, 2017, 2019, 2021, 2023)
Guinea	Top five at 2024 African Championship	26 January 2024	0 (debut)
Iceland	European playoffs	11 May 2024	22 (1958, 1961, 1964, 1970, 1974, 1978, 1986, 1990, 1993, 1995, 1997, 2001, 2003, 2005, 2007, 2011, 2013, 2015, 2017, 2019, 2021, 2023)
Austria	European playoffs	12 May 2024	7 (1938, 1958, 1993, 2011, 2015, 2019, 2021)
Netherlands	European playoffs	12 May 2024	2 (1961, 2023)
Slovenia	European playoffs	12 May 2024	10 (1995, 2001, 2003, 2005, 2007, 2013, 2015, 2017, 2021, 2023)
Czech Republic	European playoffs	12 May 2024	6 (1995, 1997, 2001, 2005, 2007, 2015)
Portugal	European playoffs	12 May 2024	5 (1997, 2001, 2003, 2021, 2023)
Hungary	European playoffs	12 May 2024	22 (1958, 1964, 1967, 1970, 1974, 1978, 1982, 1986, 1990, 1993, 1995, 1997, 1999, 2003, 2007, 2009, 2011, 2013, 2017, 2019, 2021, 2023)
Spain	European playoffs	12 May 2024	22 (1958, 1974, 1978, 1982, 1986, 1990, 1993, 1995, 1997, 1999, 2001, 2003, **2005**, 2007, 2009, 2011, **2013**, 2015, 2017, 2019, 2021, 2023)
Poland	European playoffs	12 May 2024	17 (1958, 1967, 1970, 1974, 1978, 1982, 1986, 1990, 2003, 2007, 2009, 2011, 2013, 2015, 2017, 2021, 2023)
Italy	European playoffs	12 May 2024	1 (1997)
North Macedonia	European playoffs	12 May 2024	8 (1999, 2009, 2013, 2015, 2017, 2019, 2021, 2023)
Cuba	Winner of the 2024 Nor.Ca. Championship	12 May 2024	7 (1982, 1986, 1990, 1995, 1997, 1999, 2009)
Switzerland	Wildcard	23 May 2024	11 (1954, 1961, 1964, 1967, 1970, 1982, 1986, 1990, 1993, 1995, 2021)

^{1} Bold indicates champion for that year. Italic indicates host country for that year.
^{2} From both German teams only East Germany was qualified in 1990

== Slot allocation ==
The slot allocation is as follows:

- AHF (Asia): 4 slots
- CAHB (Africa): 5 slots
- EHF (Europe): 17 slots (including the three co-hosts)
- NACHC (North America and the Caribbean): 1 slot
- OCHF (Oceania): 0 slots
- SCAHC (South and Central America): 3 slots
- Wildcards: 2 slots

Detailed distribution of places (following current IHF rules)	Vacancies	Details	Comments
Organisers (Note: All hosting federations are automatically entitled to take part in the World Championship. If there is more than one organiser from the same continental confederation, the number of compulsory places of the respective confederation shall be reduced accordingly. If there is more than one organiser and the organisers are not from the same confederation, the IHF Council shall decide about the reduction of the compulsory places, considering only the compulsory places of the confederations involved.)	3		
Reigning world champion (Note: The reigning world champion automatically qualifies for the next World Championship and, as a rule, is placed first in the first performance row. In case the reigning world champion is also hosting the next World Championship, the confederation of the reigning world champion obtains one additional performance place.)	1		
Performance places for the continental confederations	12		Based on teams ranked 1–12 in the preceding world championship
Africa		1	As Egypt ranked 7th in previous World Championship
Asia		0	
Europe		11	
North America and the Caribbean		0	
South and Central America		0	
Oceania		0	
Compulsory places for the continental confederations	15		17 compulsory places reduced by 2 due to having three organisers
Africa		4	
Asia		4	
Europe		2	4 compulsory places reduced by 2 due to having three organisers from Europe
North America and the Caribbean		1	
South and Central America		3	
Oceania		0 or 1 (Note: The continental confederation of Oceania does not have a direct compulsory place for a confederational qualification event, therefore, the Oceanian confederation is invited to participate in the Asian qualification events. The compulsory place is awarded to Oceania if the representative from Oceania is ranked 5th or higher in the Asian qualification. If Oceania fails to rank 5th or does not participate, the IHF Council will award this place as a free wild card.)	Place allocated to Oceania or an additional free wild card
Wild card	1 or 2 (Note: If the teams representing Oceania fail to finish in the top 5 of the Asian Championship or does not participate, the IHF Council will change Oceania's spot into a second wild card.)		
Total	32		

== Summary ==
=== Summary of qualification process ===
The World Championship hosts will be directly qualified, along with the reigning world champions. In regards to the 12 performance spots, and based on the results of the 2023 Men's World Championship, Europe receives 11 more spots, while Africa takes 1.

Map of each IHF federation.
Detailed summary of 2025 World Men's Handball Championship qualification process
Confederation	Direct slots	Teams started	Teams eliminated	Teams qualified	Percentage of entered teams with spots in finals	Qualifying start date	Qualifying end date
AHF	4	16	12	4	25%	11 January 2024	25 January 2024
CAHB	5	16	11	5	31.25%	17 January 2024	27 January 2024
EHF (Note: There are ways of qualifying from Europe, via the European Championship or European qualification)	14+3+1	34+3	19	14+3+1	41.1%	1 November 2023	12 May 2024
NACHC	1+1	6	5	1+1	16.67%	6 May 2024	12 May 2024
OCHF (Note: The Asian Championship acts as qualification for the Oceanian teams.)	0 or 1	1 (Note: New Zealand, who is the only Oceanian who entered, participates in the Asian Championship to decides their qualification.)	1	0	6.25%	11 January 2024	25 January 2024
SCAHC	3	10	7	3	30%	21 February 2023	20 January 2024
Total	27+3+2	76+3	49	27+3+2		21 February 2023	12 May 2024

=== Summary of qualified teams ===
Competition	Dates	Host	Vacancies	Qualified
Host nations	28 February 2020	(Egypt) Cairo	3	Croatia; Denmark; Norway
2023 World Championship	11–29 January 2023	Poland; Sweden	1	None (Note: Denmark won the 2023 World Championship, but since they already qualified as a co-host, no one took the spot.)
2024 European Men's Handball Championship	10–28 January 2024	Germany	3	France; Germany; Sweden
2024 Asian Men's Handball Championship	11–25 January 2024	Bahrain	4	Bahrain; Japan; Kuwait; Qatar
2024 South and Central American Men's Handball Championship	16–20 January 2024	Argentina	3	Argentina; Brazil; Chile
2024 African Men's Handball Championship	17–27 January 2024	Egypt	5	Algeria; Cape Verde; Egypt; Guinea; Tunisia
2024 Nor.Ca. Men's Handball Championship	6–12 May 2024	Mexico	1	Cuba
European qualification	1 November 2023 – 12 May 2024	Various	11	Austria; Czech Republic; Hungary; Iceland; Italy; Netherlands; North Macedonia; Poland; Portugal; Slovenia; Spain
Oceania			0 (Note: If countries from Oceania (Australia or New Zealand) participating in the Asian Championships had finished within the top 5, they would have qualified for the World Championships. As they finished placed sixth or lower, the place was transferred into a second wildcard spot.)	
Wildcards	18 October 2018	(Qatar) Doha	2 (Note: To bear in mind the 2028 Summer Olympics, the IHF Council awarded the United States wild cards for the 2025 and 2027 World Championships.)	Switzerland; United States

== World Championship ==
World champion directly qualified for 2025 edition. However, 2025 co-hosts Denmark won the 2023 World Championship, so no one took the spot.

Rank	Team
1st place, gold medalist(s)	Denmark
2nd place, silver medalist(s)	France
3rd place, bronze medalist(s)	Spain
4	Sweden
5	Germany
6	Norway
7	Egypt
8	Hungary
9	Croatia
10	Slovenia
11	Serbia
12	Iceland
13	Portugal
14	Netherlands
15	Poland
16	Bahrain
17	Brazil
18	Montenegro
19	Argentina
20	United States
21	Belgium
22	Qatar
23	Cape Verde
24	Iran
25	Tunisia
26	Chile
27	North Macedonia
28	South Korea
29	Saudi Arabia
30	Morocco
31	Algeria
32	Uruguay

== Asia ==
Sixteen teams competed in the Asian Championship, held at the Sheikh Khalifa Sports City Hall in Isa Town, Bahrain, from 11 to 25 January 2024. The top 4 reached the world championship. Since New Zealand, failed to make the top 5 of the championship, Oceania's spot was made into a second wildcard. Bahrain, Kuwait, Japan and Qatar reached the world championship.

Rank	Team
1st place, gold medalist(s)	Qatar
2nd place, silver medalist(s)	Japan
3rd place, bronze medalist(s)	Bahrain
4	Kuwait
5	South Korea
6	Iran
7	United Arab Emirates
8	Iraq
9	Saudi Arabia
10	China
11	Chinese Taipei
12	Oman
13	Hong Kong
14	Kazakhstan
15	New Zealand
16	India

Qualified for the 2025 World Men's Handball Championship
Oceanian representative

== Africa ==
Sixteen teams competed in the African Championship, held in Cairo, Egypt, from 17 to 27 January 2024. The top five from the championship qualified. Those teams ended up being Algeria, Cape Verde, Egypt, Guinea and Tunisia.

Rank	Team
1st place, gold medalist(s)	Egypt
2nd place, silver medalist(s)	Algeria
3rd place, bronze medalist(s)	Tunisia
4	Cape Verde
5	Guinea
6	DR Congo
7	Morocco
8	Angola
9	Nigeria
10	Cameroon
11	Gabon
12	Libya
13	Congo
14	Rwanda
15	Kenya
16	Zambia

Team qualified for the 2025 World Men's Handball Championship

== Europe ==
The three highest ranked non-qualified teams secure a ticket to the world championship. Since Denmark (who finished second) already qualified as a co-host, fourth placed Germany took the place.

Rank	Team
1st place, gold medalist(s)	France
2nd place, silver medalist(s)	Denmark
3rd place, bronze medalist(s)	Sweden
4	Germany
5	Hungary
6	Slovenia
7	Portugal
8	Austria
9	Norway
10	Iceland
11	Croatia
12	Netherlands
13	Spain
14	Montenegro
15	Czech Republic
16	Poland
17	North Macedonia
18	Georgia
19	Serbia
20	Faroe Islands
21	Switzerland
22	Romania
23	Greece
24	Bosnia and Herzegovina

Team qualified for the 2025 World Men's Handball Championship
Team qualified for the 2025 World Men's Handball Championship as co-host

=== European qualification ===
From November 2023 to May 2024, the EHF organised a separate qualification for 11 places.

=== Bracket ===
The draw took place on 27 January 2024 in Cologne.

Team 1	Agg.	Team 2	1st leg	2nd leg
Lithuania	49–69	Hungary	26–33	23–36
Slovenia	60–60; 4–1 (p)	Switzerland	26–27	34–33
Portugal	55–45	Bosnia and Herzegovina	29–19	26–26
Georgia	56–64	Austria	25–27	31–37
Iceland	87–49	Estonia	50–25	37–24
Greece	56–58	Netherlands	31–27	25–31
Spain	54–53	Serbia	32–28	22–25
Italy	66–58	Montenegro	32–26	34–32
Romania	51–59	Czech Republic	31–30	20–29
Poland	61–54	Slovakia	28–29	33–25
Faroe Islands	60–61	North Macedonia	34–27	26–34

== North America and Caribbean ==
The championship will be held from 6 to 12 May 2024 in Mexico where the winner secures the regional ticket. Had the United States won, second place would've taken the ticket. Cuba were victorious and qualified for the World Championship.

Pos	Team	Pld	W	D	L	GF	GA	GD	Pts	Qualification
1	Cuba	5	5	0	0	175	110	+65	10	Final
2	Mexico (H)	5	3	0	2	138	132	+6	6 (Note: Mexico 2 Pts, +8 GD; Greenland 2 Pts, –1 GD; United States 2 Pts, –7 GD)	Final
3	Greenland	5	3	0	2	143	137	+6	6	Third place match
4	United States	5	3	0	2	143	150	−7	6	Third place match
5	Puerto Rico	5	1	0	4	111	146	−35	2	Fifth place match
6	Canada	5	0	0	5	123	158	−35	0	Fifth place match

Source: NACHC
Rules for classification: 1) points; 2) head-to-head points; 3) head-to-head goal difference; 4) head-to-head number of goals scored; 5) goal difference.
(H) Hosts

=== Final ===
12 May 2024; 17:00	Cuba	36–21	Mexico	Mexico City; Attendance: 279; Referees: Estrada, Pineda (COL)
12 May 2024; 17:00	Rodríguez 8	(18–10)	Flores 4	Mexico City; Attendance: 279; Referees: Estrada, Pineda (COL)
12 May 2024; 17:00	6× (suspension)	Report	1× (yellow card) 2× (suspension)	Mexico City; Attendance: 279; Referees: Estrada, Pineda (COL)

== South and Central America ==
Six teams competed in the South and Central American Championship, held at the La Casa del Handball Argentino in Buenos Aires, Argentina, from 16 to 20 January 2024. The top three from the championship qualified. Brazil, Argentina and Chile would finish in top three and advance to the world championship. Brazil were the first country from any region to qualify on 18 January 2024.

Pos	Team	Pld	W	D	L	GF	GA	GD	Pts	Qualification
1st place, gold medalist(s)	Brazil	5	5	0	0	207	103	+104	10	2025 World Championship
2nd place, silver medalist(s)	Argentina (H)	5	3	1	1	173	101	+72	7 (Note: Argentina 27–27 Chile)	2025 World Championship
3rd place, bronze medalist(s)	Chile	5	3	1	1	151	107	+44	7	2025 World Championship
4	Paraguay	5	2	0	3	114	188	−74	4	
5	Uruguay	5	1	0	4	113	151	−38	2	
6	Costa Rica	5	0	0	5	87	195	−108	0	

Source: SCAHC
Rules for classification: 1) points; 2) head-to-head points; 3) head-to-head goal difference; 4) head-to-head number of goals scored; 5) goal difference.
(H) Hosts

== Wildcards ==
After no Oceanian team achieved a top 5 finish in the Asian Championship, two wildcards were given out by the IHF. United States was given the first wildcard on 18 October 2018, in order to prepare them for the 2028 Summer Olympics which they are hosting. Regarding the second wildcard, 12 nations reportedly applied, with 2 of the applicants unknown.

- Bosnia and Herzegovina
- China
- Faroe Islands
- Georgia
- Greece
- Montenegro
- Saudi Arabia
- Serbia
- Switzerland
- Turkey

On 23 May 2024, Switzerland was given the second wildcard by the IHF due to multiple reasons: their sporting merit, their commercial reach, their project and the IHF's TV partner asked the Swiss to be picked. Prior to their selection, Switzerland's coach, Andy Schmid, stated that after their narrow penalty shootout loss to Slovenia, The Swiss' performance merited a wildcard.
