= Leandro Semedo =

Cape Verdean handball player

Personal information
- Full name: Leandro Elías Borges Silva Semedo
- Nationality: Cape Verdean
- Born: 24 December 1994 (age 31) Praia, Cape Verde
- Height: 1.92 m (6 ft 4 in)

Sport
- Sport: Handball
- Position: Left back
- Current club: S.L. Benfica
- Number: 28

Senior clubs
- Years: Team
- 2012: Desportivo da Praia
- 2013: ABC da Praia
- 2014–2020: FC Porto
- 2019–2020: SCDR Anaitasuna (Loan)
- 2020–2022: CB Ademar León
- 2022–: S.L. Benfica
National team
Years	Team	Apps	(Gls)
2021–	Cape Verde	32	(6)
Medal record
African Championship
Bronze medal – third place	2026 Rwanda

Leandro Semedo (born 24 December 1994) is a Cape Verdean handball player for S.L. Benfica and the Cape Verde men's national handball team.

== Career ==
He made his competitive national debut on 15 January 2021, in the 2021 World Men's Handball Championship against Hungary and lost 27–34.
