= Ljubomir Obradović =

Serbian handball coach (born 1954)

Personal information
- Nationality: Serbian
- Born: 15 September 1954 (age 72) Bački Gračac, FPR Yugoslavia

Sport
- Sport: Handball
- Position: Centre/Left back
- Current club: Cape Verde (manager)

Senior clubs
- Years: Team
- –: RK Vojvodina
- –: RK Novi Sad
- –: RK Dinamo Pančevo
- –: RK Proleter Zrenjanin
- –: Elgorriaga Bidasoa
- –: Vitória Setúbal
National team
- Years: Team
- –: SFR Yugoslavia

Teams managed
- 1992–1993: Comercio e Industria de Setubal
- 1993–1994: Belenenses
- 1994–1996: RK Crvena zvezda
- 1997–1998: RK Partizan
- 1998–1999: Madeira SAD
- 2000–2001: RK Vardar
- 2007–2008: ISAVE
- 2008–2009: RK Lovćen
- 2009–2015: FC Porto
- 2014–2016: Montenegro
- 2017–2021: Serbia (women)
- 2021–: Cape Verde

Ljubomir Obradović (born 16 September 1954) is a Serbian handball coach of the Cape Verde national team.

== Managerial honours ==
Belenenses

- Portuguese First Division: 1993–94

Crvena zvezda

- FR Yugoslavia First League: 1995–96
- FR Yugoslavia Cup: 1994–95, 1995–96

Partizan

- FR Yugoslavia Cup: 1997–98

Madeira SAD

- Portuguese Cup: 1998–99

Vardar

- Macedonian Super League: 2000–01
- Macedonian Cup: 2000–01

Lovćen

- Montenegro Cup: 2008–09

FC Porto

- Portuguese First Division: 2009–10, 2010–11, 2011–12, 2012–13, 2013–14, 2014–15
- Portuguese Super Cup: 2009–10, 2013–14
- Limburgse Handbal Dagen: 2009, 2012

Yugoslavia (under–20)

- European U20 Championship: 2000
