= 2025 World Men's Handball Championship =

Svjetsko prvenstvo u rukometu 2025. (in Croatian) Verdensmesterskabet i håndbold for mænd 2025 (in Danish) Verdensmesterskapet i håndball for menn 2025 (in Norwegian)

Tournament details
- Host countries: Croatia; Denmark; Norway
- Venues: 5 (in 5 host cities)
- Dates: 14 January–2 February
- Teams: 32 (from 5 confederations)

Final positions
- Champions: Denmark (4th title)
- Runners-up: Croatia
- Third place: France
- Fourth place: Portugal

Tournament statistics
- Matches played: 108
- Goals scored: 6,291 (58.25 per match)
- Attendance: 533,060 (4,936 per match)
- Top scorers: (Denmark) Mathias Gidsel (74 goals)

Awards
- Best player: (Denmark) Mathias Gidsel

The 2025 IHF World Men's Handball Championship was the 29th such event hosted by the International Handball Federation. It was held in Croatia, Denmark and Norway from 14 January to 2 February 2025. This edition marked the first time the world championship was held in three countries.

Co-host Denmark were the triple defending champions, having won the 2019, 2021 and 2023 editions, and successfully defended their title by defeating co-host Croatia 32–26 in the final. In doing so, Denmark became the first men's national handball team to win four consecutive world titles. France beat Portugal to win the bronze medals, while third co-host Norway finished 10th.

Denmark beat the record for the highest average win margin after 7 matches at a World Championship played with +13.4 goals. They also extended their record of most World Championship matches in a row without defeat to 31.

== Bidding process ==
On 11 October 2018, five nations expressed interest in hosting the tournament.

- Croatia
- Denmark/Norway/Switzerland
- Serbia

The deadline elapsed on 25 September 2019. Switzerland became a solo bid, while Croatia took their place in the triple bid. Serbia withdrew their bid, while Hungary filed both an application and deferment for a later tournament. These were the applicants:

- Croatia/Denmark/Norway
- Hungary (withdrew)
- Switzerland (withdrew)

Shortly before the vote, Hungary and Switzerland both withdrew, leaving the bid of Croatia, Denmark and Norway unopposed. Croatia, Denmark and Norway were chosen as the hosts on 28 February 2020 at the IHF Council meeting in Cairo, Egypt. This edition marks the first time Norway hosts the World Men's Handball Championship, the second for Croatia, and the third for Denmark.

== Venues ==
The bid contained 11 cities: Zagreb, Split, Varaždin, Poreč and Dubrovnik in Croatia; Copenhagen and Herning in Denmark; and Trondheim, Stavanger, Drammen and Bærum in Norway; with the opening match and final taking place in Bærum.

On 25 January 2024, Denmark announced that the Jyske Bank Boxen would be their only venue for the competition. Then, two days later, Norway announced the Telenor Arena would be their only venue for the tournament, after negotiations with Trondheim fell through due to financial reasons.

On 8 April 2024, the IHF announced the venues, with Bærum, Herning, Zagreb, Varaždin and Poreč. being confirmed as hosts cities. The opening game will be in Herning and the final will be in Bærum. During the preparations for the tournament, the Telenor Arena was renamed the Unity Arena for the tournament.

City/town	Country	Venue	Capacity	Image
Bærum	Norway	Unity Arena	15,000	
Herning	Denmark	Jyske Bank Boxen	12,500	
Zagreb	Croatia	Arena Zagreb	15,200	
Varaždin	Croatia	Varaždin Arena	5,200	
Poreč	Croatia	Žatika Sport Centre	3,700	

Rejected venues
(Croatia) Split	(Croatia) Dubrovnik
Spaladium Arena	New Dubrovnik Arena
Capacity: 11,000	Capacity: 4,000
(Denmark) Copenhagen	(Norway) Drammen
Royal Arena	New Drammen Arena
Capacity: 13,000	Capacity: 12,000
(Norway) Trondheim	(Norway) Stavanger
Trondheim Spektrum	Stavanger Idrettshall
Capacity: 8,960	Capacity: 4,100

== Qualification ==
The World Championship hosts were directly qualified, along with the reigning world champions. Since there were three organisers, all from Europe, the number of compulsory places for Europe was reduced by two: 2 instead of default 4. The number of compulsory places awarded to other continental confederation remained unchanged. In regards to the 12 performance spots, and based on the results of the 2023 Men's World Championship, Europe received 11 more spots, while Africa took 1.

The slot allocation was as follows:

- AHF (Asia): 4 slots
- CAHB (Africa): 5 slots
- EHF (Europe): 17 slots (including the three co-hosts)
- NACHC (North America and the Caribbean): 1 slot
- OCHF (Oceania): 0 slots
- SCAHC (South and Central America): 3 slots
- Wildcards: 2 slots

Detailed summary of qualification process
Confederation	Direct slots	Teams started	Teams eliminated	Teams qualified	Percentage of entered teams with spots in finals	Qualifying start date	Qualifying end date
AHF	4	16	12	4	25%	11 January 2024	25 January 2024
CAHB	5	16	11	5	31.25%	17 January 2024	27 January 2024
EHF (Note: There were 2 ways of qualifying from Europe, via the European Championship or European qualification)	14+3+1	34+3	19	14+3+1	41.1%	1 November 2023	12 May 2024
NACHC	1+1	6	5	1+1	16.67%	6 May 2024	12 May 2024
OCHF (Note: The Asian Championship acted as qualification for the Oceanian teams.)	0 or 1	1 (Note: New Zealand, who was the only Oceanian team who entered, participated in the Asian Championship to decide their qualification.)	1	0	6.25%	11 January 2024	25 January 2024
SCAHC	3	10	7	3	30%	21 February 2023	20 January 2024
Total	27+3+2	83+3	55	27+3+2		21 February 2023	12 May 2024

Qualifying occurred between February 2023 and May 2024. Each region's continental championships acted as world championship qualification, although Europe also has its own qualification process. With the exception of Belarus and Russia, who are banned of the IHF due to the Russian invasion of Ukraine, all remaining IHF member associations were eligible to enter qualification. In total, 83 nations have entered the continental championships and European qualifiers, which act as world championship qualification.

Guinea will make their debut at the championship. Of the returnees, Italy made their second appearance ever and first since 1997, Cuba and Kuwait are returning for the first time since the 2009 World Men's Handball Championship, Czech Republic made the championship after ten years, while Austria, Japan and Switzerland qualified after missing out on 2023. The United States made back to back appearances for the first time in 30 years. Netherlands qualified on merit for the first time ever.

Iran, Montenegro, Morocco, Saudi Arabia, Serbia, South Korea and Uruguay all failed to make this edition after participating in 2023. After making their debut in 2023, Belgium failed to qualify.

AHF (4)

- Bahrain
- Japan
- Kuwait
- Qatar

CAHB (5)

- Algeria
- Cape Verde
- Egypt
- Guinea
- Tunisia

EHF (Note: There are 2 ways of qualifying from Europe, via the European Championship or European qualification) (17+1)

- Austria
- Croatia (co-host)
- Czech Republic
- Denmark (co-host)
- France
- Germany
- Hungary
- Iceland
- Italy
- Netherlands
- North Macedonia
- Norway (co-host)
- Poland
- Portugal
- Slovenia
- Spain
- Sweden
- Switzerland ^{WC}

NACHC (1+1)

- Cuba
- United States ^{WC}

OCHF (0)

- None qualified

SCAHC (3)

- Argentina
- Brazil
- Chile

Team qualified Team failed to qualify Team withdrew or suspended Did not enter

As of 2027, this is the last time Austria, Cuba, Czech Republic, Guinea, Hungary, Netherlands and Switzerland qualified for the world championship and last time Angola, Faroe Islands, Greece, Saudi Arabia, Serbia, Turkey and Uruguay failed to qualify.

=== Wildcards ===
After no Oceanian team achieved a top 5 finish in the Asian Championship, two wildcards were given out by the IHF.

- Switzerland
- United States

As the host country of the 2028 Summer Olympics, the first wildcard was given to United States on 18 October 2018. Regarding the second wildcard, 12 non-classificated nations reportedly applied. On 23 May 2024, it was announced that the second wildcard was given to Switzerland due to multiple reasons: their sporting merit, their commercial reach, their sporting project and also due to the fact that the proposal made by the Swiss broadcast partner was the most commercially interesting for the IHF. Prior to their selection, Switzerland's coach, Andy Schmid, stated that after their narrow penalty shootout loss to Slovenia, the Swiss' performance merited a wildcard.

== Draw ==
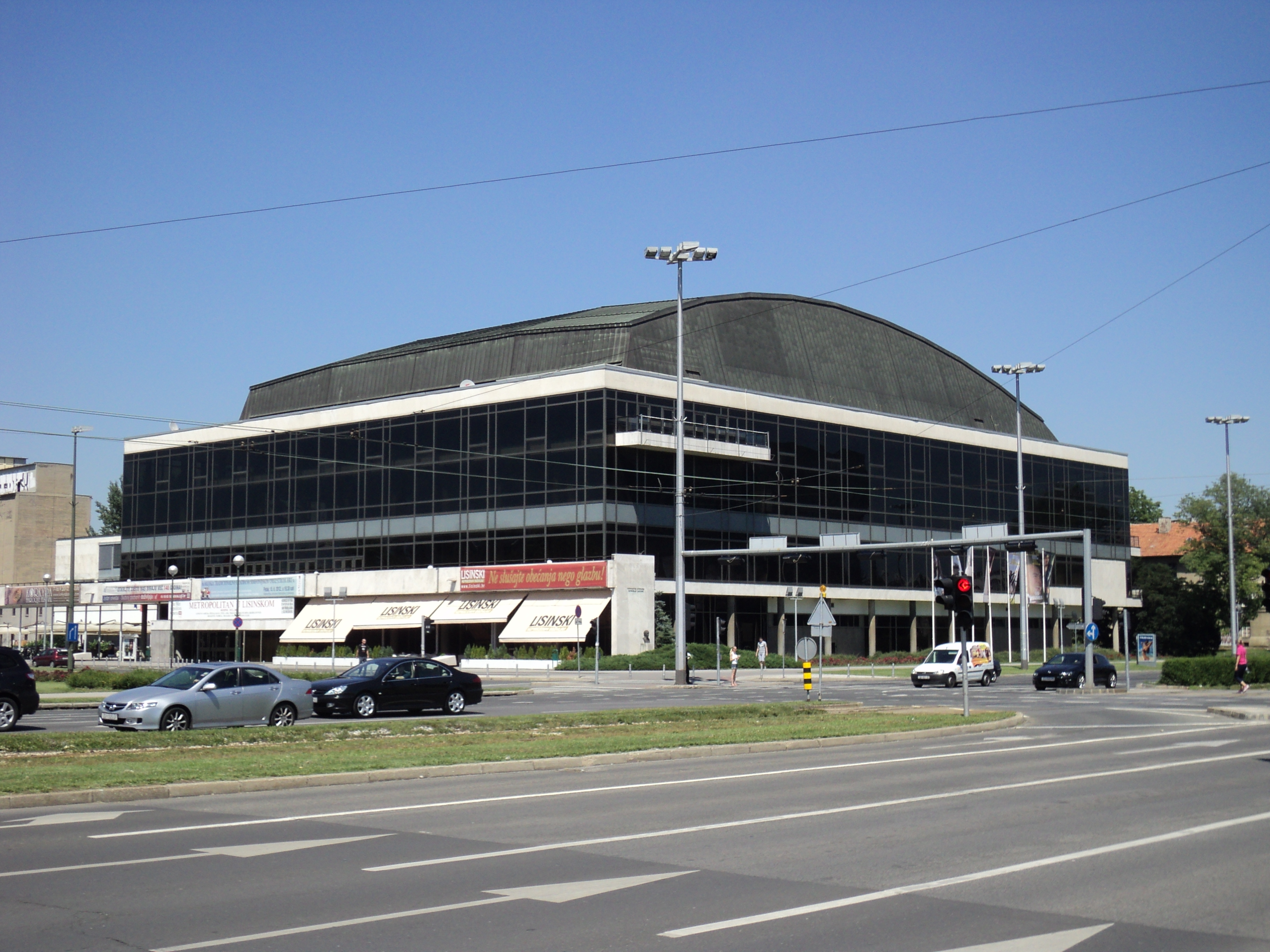
The Vatroslav Lisinski Concert Hall in Zagreb hosted the draw.

The draw took place at 19:30 CET in Zagreb, Croatia on 29 May 2024 at the Vatroslav Lisinski Concert Hall. Originally scheduled for the 1 June, it was changed a few weeks later to 29 May. The guests for the draw were Croatian goalkeeper Dominik Kuzmanović, head coach of the Croatian national team, Dagur Sigurðsson, Norwegian national team player, Alexander Blonz and former Danish international player, Morten Stig Christensen, who all assisted the draw.

=== Seeding ===
Ahead of the draw, the 32 finalist teams were seeded into four pots according to IHF rankings in May 2024. Although, in regards to the European teams in pots 1 and 2, the 2024 European Championship decided the teams' positions. In addition, five teams were pre-assigned by the three host nations into each of the available vacant groups: Germany in Group A, Austria in Group C, Hungary in Group D, Sweden in Group F and Slovenia in Group G.

Seeding based on the 2023 World Championship
Pot 1	Pot 2	Pot 3	Pot 4
Europe 1 Europe 2 Europe 3 Europe 4 Europe 5 Europe 6 Europe 7 Africa 1	Europe 8 Europe 9 Europe 10; Europe 11; Europe 12; Europe 13; Europe 14; Europe 15	Asia 1 South America 1 Europe 16; South America 2 North America 1 Europe 17; Asia 2 Africa 2	Asia 3 Africa 3 South America 3 Asia 4 Africa 4 Africa 5 Wild card 1 Wild card 2

Pot 1	Pot 2	Pot 3	Pot 4
Denmark; France; Sweden; Germany; Hungary; Slovenia; Norway; Egypt	Portugal; Croatia; Austria; Iceland; Netherlands; Spain; Italy; Czech Republic	Poland; North Macedonia; Qatar; Brazil; Argentina; Cuba; Japan; Algeria	Bahrain; Tunisia; Chile; Kuwait; Cape Verde; Guinea; United States; Switzerland

== Referees ==
The referee pairs were selected on 14 November 2024. The list was updated on 2 January 2025.

Referees
Algeria	Youcef Belkhiri; Sid Ali Hamidi
Argentina	Julian Grillo; Sebastián Lenci
Argentina	Mariana García; María Paolantoni
Austria	Denis Bolic; Christoph Hurich
Bosnia and Herzegovina	Amar Konjičanin; Dino Konjičanin
Croatia	Ante Mikelić; Petar Parađina
Czech Republic	Václav Horáček; Jiří Novotný
Denmark	Mads Hansen; Jesper Madsen

Referees
France	Karim Gasmi; Raouf Gasmi
Germany	Robert Schulze; Tobias Tönnies
Hungary	Ádám Bíró; Olivér Kiss
Iran	Ahmad Gheisarian; Amir Gheisarian
Moldova	Alexei Covalciuc; Igor Covalciuc
North Macedonia	Gjorgji Nachevski; Slave Nikolov
Montenegro	Ivan Pavićević; Miloš Ražnatović
Norway	Håvard Kleven; Lars Jørum

Referees
Romania	Cristina Lovin; Simona Stancu
Serbia	Vladimir Jovandić; Marko Sekulić
Slovakia	Andrej Budzák; Michaal Záhradník
Slovenia	Bojan Lah; David Sok
Spain	Javier Álvarez; Yon Bustamante
Spain	Ignacio Garcia; Andreu Marin
Sweden	Mirza Kurtagic; Mattias Wetterwik
Uruguay	Cristian Lemes; Mathias Sosa

== Preliminary round ==
The schedule was announced on 8 April 2024.

All times are local (UTC+1).

=== Group A ===
Pos	Team	Pld	W	D	L	GF	GA	GD	Pts	Qualification
1	Germany	3	3	0	0	95	79	+16	6	Main round Group I
2	Switzerland	3	1	1	1	76	76	0	3	Main round Group I
3	Czech Republic	3	0	2	1	58	65	−7	2	Main round Group I
4	Poland	3	0	1	2	75	84	−9	1	President's Cup Group I

Source: IHF
Rules for classification: 1) points; 2) head-to-head points; 3) head-to-head goal difference; 4) head-to-head number of goals scored; 5) goal difference.

15 January 2025; 18:00	Czech Republic	17–17	Switzerland	Jyske Bank Boxen, Herning; Attendance: 2,091; Referees: Grillo, Lenci (ARG)
15 January 2025; 18:00	Mořkovský 5	(7–8)	Rubin 8	Jyske Bank Boxen, Herning; Attendance: 2,091; Referees: Grillo, Lenci (ARG)
15 January 2025; 18:00	3× (suspension)	Report	1× (yellow card) 2× (suspension)	Jyske Bank Boxen, Herning; Attendance: 2,091; Referees: Grillo, Lenci (ARG)

15 January 2025; 20:30	Germany	35–28	Poland	Jyske Bank Boxen, Herning; Attendance: 3,552; Referees: Nachevski, Nikolov (MKD)
15 January 2025; 20:30	Uščins 10	(15–14)	Pietrasik 7	Jyske Bank Boxen, Herning; Attendance: 3,552; Referees: Nachevski, Nikolov (MKD)
15 January 2025; 20:30	1× (yellow card) 4× (suspension)	Report	1× (yellow card) 5× (suspension)	Jyske Bank Boxen, Herning; Attendance: 3,552; Referees: Nachevski, Nikolov (MKD)

17 January 2025; 18:00	Czech Republic	19–19	Poland	Jyske Bank Boxen, Herning; Attendance: 5,397; Referees: A. Konjičanin, D. Konjičanin (BIH)
17 January 2025; 18:00	Hrstka 5	(12–9)	four players 3	Jyske Bank Boxen, Herning; Attendance: 5,397; Referees: A. Konjičanin, D. Konjičanin (BIH)
17 January 2025; 18:00	5× (suspension) 1× (red card)	Report	3× (suspension) 1× (red card)	Jyske Bank Boxen, Herning; Attendance: 5,397; Referees: A. Konjičanin, D. Konjičanin (BIH)

17 January 2025; 20:30	Switzerland	29–31	Germany	Jyske Bank Boxen, Herning; Attendance: 7,386; Referees: Mikelić, Parađina (CRO)
17 January 2025; 20:30	Rubin 7	(14–15)	Köster 7	Jyske Bank Boxen, Herning; Attendance: 7,386; Referees: Mikelić, Parađina (CRO)
17 January 2025; 20:30	2× (yellow card) 2× (suspension)	Report	2× (suspension)	Jyske Bank Boxen, Herning; Attendance: 7,386; Referees: Mikelić, Parađina (CRO)

19 January 2025; 15:30	Poland	28–30	Switzerland	Jyske Bank Boxen, Herning; Attendance: 5,653; Referees: Pavićević, Ražnatović (MNE)
19 January 2025; 15:30	Przytuła 9	(15–18)	three players 5	Jyske Bank Boxen, Herning; Attendance: 5,653; Referees: Pavićević, Ražnatović (MNE)
19 January 2025; 15:30	4× (suspension)	Report	1× (yellow card) 4× (suspension)	Jyske Bank Boxen, Herning; Attendance: 5,653; Referees: Pavićević, Ražnatović (MNE)

19 January 2025; 18:00	Germany	29–22	Czech Republic	Jyske Bank Boxen, Herning; Attendance: 7,528; Referees: Álvarez, Bustamante (ESP)
19 January 2025; 18:00	Uščins 8	(11–11)	Solák 7	Jyske Bank Boxen, Herning; Attendance: 7,528; Referees: Álvarez, Bustamante (ESP)
19 January 2025; 18:00	4× (suspension)	Report	5× (suspension) 1× (red card)	Jyske Bank Boxen, Herning; Attendance: 7,528; Referees: Álvarez, Bustamante (ESP)

=== Group B ===
Pos	Team	Pld	W	D	L	GF	GA	GD	Pts	Qualification
1	Denmark (H)	3	3	0	0	118	63	+55	6	Main round Group I
2	Italy	3	2	0	1	84	87	−3	4	Main round Group I
3	Tunisia	3	1	0	2	72	89	−17	2	Main round Group I
4	Algeria	3	0	0	3	70	105	−35	0	President's Cup Group I

Source: IHF
Rules for classification: 1) points; 2) head-to-head points; 3) head-to-head goal difference; 4) head-to-head number of goals scored; 5) goal difference.
(H) Hosts

14 January 2025; 17:30	Italy	32–25	Tunisia	Jyske Bank Boxen, Herning; Attendance: 6,510; Referees: A. Konjičanin, D. Konjičanin (BIH)
14 January 2025; 17:30	Prantner 10	(17–11)	Ben Abdallah 6	Jyske Bank Boxen, Herning; Attendance: 6,510; Referees: A. Konjičanin, D. Konjičanin (BIH)
14 January 2025; 17:30	2× (suspension)	Report	6× (suspension)	Jyske Bank Boxen, Herning; Attendance: 6,510; Referees: A. Konjičanin, D. Konjičanin (BIH)

14 January 2025; 20:30	Denmark	47–22	Algeria	Jyske Bank Boxen, Herning; Attendance: 12,397; Referees: Mikelić, Parađina (CRO)
14 January 2025; 20:30	Gidsel 10	(20–11)	Abdi 6	Jyske Bank Boxen, Herning; Attendance: 12,397; Referees: Mikelić, Parađina (CRO)
14 January 2025; 20:30	1× (yellow card) 1× (suspension)	Report	1× (yellow card) 4× (suspension)	Jyske Bank Boxen, Herning; Attendance: 12,397; Referees: Mikelić, Parađina (CRO)

16 January 2025; 18:00	Italy	32–23	Algeria	Jyske Bank Boxen, Herning; Attendance: 8,516; Referees: Álvarez, Bustamante (ESP)
16 January 2025; 18:00	Prantner 7	(16–11)	Abdi, Berkous 6	Jyske Bank Boxen, Herning; Attendance: 8,516; Referees: Álvarez, Bustamante (ESP)
16 January 2025; 18:00	1× (yellow card) 2× (suspension)	Report	6× (suspension)	Jyske Bank Boxen, Herning; Attendance: 8,516; Referees: Álvarez, Bustamante (ESP)

16 January 2025; 20:30	Tunisia	21–32	Denmark	Jyske Bank Boxen, Herning; Attendance: 13,697; Referees: Pavićević, Ražnatović (MNE)
16 January 2025; 20:30	Ben Abdallah 5	(7–17)	Gidsel 9	Jyske Bank Boxen, Herning; Attendance: 13,697; Referees: Pavićević, Ražnatović (MNE)
16 January 2025; 20:30	2× (suspension)	Report	1× (suspension)	Jyske Bank Boxen, Herning; Attendance: 13,697; Referees: Pavićević, Ražnatović (MNE)

18 January 2025; 18:00	Algeria	25–26	Tunisia	Jyske Bank Boxen, Herning; Attendance: 10,824; Referees: Nachevski, Nikolov (MKD)
18 January 2025; 18:00	Daoud 6	(9–13)	Jbeli 6	Jyske Bank Boxen, Herning; Attendance: 10,824; Referees: Nachevski, Nikolov (MKD)
18 January 2025; 18:00	1× (yellow card) 2× (suspension)	Report	4× (suspension)	Jyske Bank Boxen, Herning; Attendance: 10,824; Referees: Nachevski, Nikolov (MKD)

18 January 2025; 20:30	Denmark	39–20	Italy	Jyske Bank Boxen, Herning; Attendance: 14,297; Referees: Grillo, Lenci (ARG)
18 January 2025; 20:30	Jakobsen, Pytlick 9	(18–8)	Bronzo 4	Jyske Bank Boxen, Herning; Attendance: 14,297; Referees: Grillo, Lenci (ARG)
18 January 2025; 20:30	3× (suspension) 1× (red card)	Report	3× (suspension)	Jyske Bank Boxen, Herning; Attendance: 14,297; Referees: Grillo, Lenci (ARG)

=== Group C ===
Pos	Team	Pld	W	D	L	GF	GA	GD	Pts	Qualification
1	France	3	3	0	0	115	65	+50	6	Main round Group II
2	Austria	3	2	0	1	92	87	+5	4	Main round Group II
3	Qatar	3	1	0	2	70	87	−17	2	Main round Group II
4	Kuwait	3	0	0	3	67	105	−38	0	President's Cup Group I

Source: IHF
Rules for classification: 1) points; 2) head-to-head points; 3) head-to-head goal difference; 4) head-to-head number of goals scored; 5) goal difference.

14 January 2025; 18:00	France	37–19	Qatar	Žatika Sport Centre, Poreč; Attendance: 2,500; Referees: Budzák, Záhradník (SVK)
14 January 2025; 18:00	Briet 7	(18–10)	Marzo 4	Žatika Sport Centre, Poreč; Attendance: 2,500; Referees: Budzák, Záhradník (SVK)
14 January 2025; 18:00	2× (suspension)	Report	1× (suspension)	Žatika Sport Centre, Poreč; Attendance: 2,500; Referees: Budzák, Záhradník (SVK)

14 January 2025; 20:30	Austria	37–26	Kuwait	Žatika Sport Centre, Poreč; Attendance: 1,507; Referees: A. Covalciuc, I. Covalciuc (MDA)
14 January 2025; 20:30	four players 5	(18–16)	three players 4	Žatika Sport Centre, Poreč; Attendance: 1,507; Referees: A. Covalciuc, I. Covalciuc (MDA)
14 January 2025; 20:30	2× (suspension)	Report	5× (suspension)	Žatika Sport Centre, Poreč; Attendance: 1,507; Referees: A. Covalciuc, I. Covalciuc (MDA)

16 January 2025; 18:00	Kuwait	19–43	France	Žatika Sport Centre, Poreč; Attendance: 1,042; Referees: García, Paolantoni (ARG)
16 January 2025; 18:00	Al-Dawani 5	(8–21)	Remili 6	Žatika Sport Centre, Poreč; Attendance: 1,042; Referees: García, Paolantoni (ARG)
16 January 2025; 18:00	2× (suspension)	Report		Žatika Sport Centre, Poreč; Attendance: 1,042; Referees: García, Paolantoni (ARG)

16 January 2025; 20:30	Austria	28–26	Qatar	Žatika Sport Centre, Poreč; Attendance: 1,741; Referees: Horáček, Novotný (CZE)
16 January 2025; 20:30	Frimmel 9	(16–14)	Marzo 11	Žatika Sport Centre, Poreč; Attendance: 1,741; Referees: Horáček, Novotný (CZE)
16 January 2025; 20:30	1× (suspension)	Report	1× (yellow card) 3× (suspension)	Žatika Sport Centre, Poreč; Attendance: 1,741; Referees: Horáček, Novotný (CZE)

18 January 2025; 18:00	France	35–27	Austria	Žatika Sport Centre, Poreč; Attendance: 3,001; Referees: Belkhiri, Hamidi (ALG)
18 January 2025; 18:00	Briet, Mem 6	(19–15)	Frimmel 5	Žatika Sport Centre, Poreč; Attendance: 3,001; Referees: Belkhiri, Hamidi (ALG)
18 January 2025; 18:00	3× (suspension)	Report	4× (suspension)	Žatika Sport Centre, Poreč; Attendance: 3,001; Referees: Belkhiri, Hamidi (ALG)

18 January 2025; 20:30	Qatar	25–22	Kuwait	Žatika Sport Centre, Poreč; Attendance: 2,104; Referees: Schulze, Tönnies (GER)
18 January 2025; 20:30	Marković 7	(11–7)	Al-Shammari 8	Žatika Sport Centre, Poreč; Attendance: 2,104; Referees: Schulze, Tönnies (GER)
18 January 2025; 20:30	1× (yellow card) 3× (suspension)	Report	2× (suspension)	Žatika Sport Centre, Poreč; Attendance: 2,104; Referees: Schulze, Tönnies (GER)

=== Group D ===
Pos	Team	Pld	W	D	L	GF	GA	GD	Pts	Qualification
1	Hungary	3	2	1	0	98	77	+21	5	Main round Group II
2	Netherlands	3	2	0	1	109	91	+18	4	Main round Group II
3	North Macedonia	3	1	1	1	88	84	+4	3	Main round Group II
4	Guinea	3	0	0	3	61	104	−43	0	President's Cup Group I

Source: IHF
Rules for classification: 1) points; 2) head-to-head points; 3) head-to-head goal difference; 4) head-to-head number of goals scored; 5) goal difference.

15 January 2025; 18:00	Netherlands	40–23	Guinea	Varaždin Arena, Varaždin; Attendance: 1,500; Referees: Lemes, Sosa (URU)
15 January 2025; 18:00	Ten Velde 9	(21–8)	Eponouh 5	Varaždin Arena, Varaždin; Attendance: 1,500; Referees: Lemes, Sosa (URU)
15 January 2025; 18:00	4× (suspension)	Report	3× (suspension)	Varaždin Arena, Varaždin; Attendance: 1,500; Referees: Lemes, Sosa (URU)

15 January 2025; 20:30	Hungary	27–27	North Macedonia	Varaždin Arena, Varaždin; Attendance: 4,000; Referees: Kurtagic, Wetterwik (SWE)
15 January 2025; 20:30	Ilić 6	(14–14)	Kuzmanovski 10	Varaždin Arena, Varaždin; Attendance: 4,000; Referees: Kurtagic, Wetterwik (SWE)
15 January 2025; 20:30	4× (suspension) 1× (red card)	Report	1× (yellow card) 3× (suspension)	Varaždin Arena, Varaždin; Attendance: 4,000; Referees: Kurtagic, Wetterwik (SWE)

17 January 2025; 18:00	Netherlands	37–32	North Macedonia	Varaždin Arena, Varaždin; Attendance: 4,000; Referees: Hansen, Madsen (DEN)
17 January 2025; 18:00	Ten Velde 11	(18–15)	Kuzmanovski 9	Varaždin Arena, Varaždin; Attendance: 4,000; Referees: Hansen, Madsen (DEN)
17 January 2025; 18:00	1× (yellow card) 6× (suspension) 1× (red card)	Report	2× (yellow card) 7× (suspension) 2× (red card)	Varaždin Arena, Varaždin; Attendance: 4,000; Referees: Hansen, Madsen (DEN)

17 January 2025; 20:30	Guinea	18–35	Hungary	Varaždin Arena, Varaždin; Attendance: 1,000; Referees: Ah. Gheisarian, Am. Gheisarian (IRI)
17 January 2025; 20:30	four players 3	(9–20)	Szita 7	Varaždin Arena, Varaždin; Attendance: 1,000; Referees: Ah. Gheisarian, Am. Gheisarian (IRI)
17 January 2025; 20:30	5× (suspension)	Report	1× (suspension)	Varaždin Arena, Varaždin; Attendance: 1,000; Referees: Ah. Gheisarian, Am. Gheisarian (IRI)

19 January 2025; 18:00	North Macedonia	29–20	Guinea	Varaždin Arena, Varaždin; Attendance: 4,000; Referees: A. Covalciuc, I. Covalciuc (MDA)
19 January 2025; 18:00	Kuzmanovski 12	(14–10)	Corcher 4	Varaždin Arena, Varaždin; Attendance: 4,000; Referees: A. Covalciuc, I. Covalciuc (MDA)
19 January 2025; 18:00	2× (suspension)	Report	3× (suspension)	Varaždin Arena, Varaždin; Attendance: 4,000; Referees: A. Covalciuc, I. Covalciuc (MDA)

19 January 2025; 20:30	Hungary	36–32	Netherlands	Varaždin Arena, Varaždin; Attendance: 4,000; Referees: Jørum, Kleven (NOR)
19 January 2025; 20:30	three players 6	(19–17)	Ten Velde 10	Varaždin Arena, Varaždin; Attendance: 4,000; Referees: Jørum, Kleven (NOR)
19 January 2025; 20:30	1× (yellow card) 8× (suspension)	Report	6× (suspension) 1× (red card)	Varaždin Arena, Varaždin; Attendance: 4,000; Referees: Jørum, Kleven (NOR)

=== Group E ===
Pos	Team	Pld	W	D	L	GF	GA	GD	Pts	Qualification
1	Portugal	3	3	0	0	91	75	+16	6	Main round Group III
2	Brazil	3	2	0	1	86	80	+6	4	Main round Group III
3	Norway (H)	3	1	0	2	87	77	+10	2	Main round Group III
4	United States	3	0	0	3	62	94	−32	0	President's Cup Group II

Source: IHF
Rules for classification: 1) points; 2) head-to-head points; 3) head-to-head goal difference; 4) head-to-head number of goals scored; 5) goal difference.
(H) Hosts

15 January 2025; 18:00	Portugal	30–21	United States	Unity Arena, Bærum; Attendance: 3,980; Referees: Lovin, Stancu (ROU)
15 January 2025; 18:00	M. Costa, Portela 7	(15–10)	Hoddersen 6	Unity Arena, Bærum; Attendance: 3,980; Referees: Lovin, Stancu (ROU)
15 January 2025; 18:00	1× (yellow card) 2× (suspension)	Report	3× (suspension)	Unity Arena, Bærum; Attendance: 3,980; Referees: Lovin, Stancu (ROU)

15 January 2025; 20:30	Norway	26–29	Brazil	Unity Arena, Bærum; Attendance: 7,917; Referees: K. Gasmi, R. Gasmi (FRA)
15 January 2025; 20:30	Grøndahl 6	(14–12)	Langaro 8	Unity Arena, Bærum; Attendance: 7,917; Referees: K. Gasmi, R. Gasmi (FRA)
15 January 2025; 20:30	1× (yellow card) 1× (suspension)	Report	6× (suspension) 1× (red card)	Unity Arena, Bærum; Attendance: 7,917; Referees: K. Gasmi, R. Gasmi (FRA)

17 January 2025; 18:00	Portugal	30–26	Brazil	Unity Arena, Bærum; Attendance: 5,762; Referees: Bíró, Kiss (HUN)
17 January 2025; 18:00	M. Costa 9	(12–15)	Dupoux, Langaro 5	Unity Arena, Bærum; Attendance: 5,762; Referees: Bíró, Kiss (HUN)
17 January 2025; 18:00	3× (suspension)	Report	4× (suspension)	Unity Arena, Bærum; Attendance: 5,762; Referees: Bíró, Kiss (HUN)

17 January 2025; 20:30	United States	17–33	Norway	Unity Arena, Bærum; Attendance: 9,482; Referees: Jovandić, Sekulić (SRB)
17 January 2025; 20:30	Strömberg 4	(7–13)	Lyse 6	Unity Arena, Bærum; Attendance: 9,482; Referees: Jovandić, Sekulić (SRB)
17 January 2025; 20:30	1× (yellow card) 2× (suspension)	Report	4× (suspension)	Unity Arena, Bærum; Attendance: 9,482; Referees: Jovandić, Sekulić (SRB)

19 January 2025; 18:00	Brazil	31–24	United States	Unity Arena, Bærum; Attendance: 7,827; Referees: Bolic, Hurich (AUT)
19 January 2025; 18:00	Hackbarth 8	(10–12)	Strömberg 6	Unity Arena, Bærum; Attendance: 7,827; Referees: Bolic, Hurich (AUT)
19 January 2025; 18:00	2× (suspension)	Report	4× (suspension) 1× (red card)	Unity Arena, Bærum; Attendance: 7,827; Referees: Bolic, Hurich (AUT)

19 January 2025; 20:30	Norway	28–31	Portugal	Unity Arena, Bærum; Attendance: 11,345; Referees: Lah, Sok (SLO)
19 January 2025; 20:30	Lyse 9	(13–14)	F. Costa, Frade 6	Unity Arena, Bærum; Attendance: 11,345; Referees: Lah, Sok (SLO)
19 January 2025; 20:30	1× (yellow card)	Report	1× (yellow card) 2× (suspension)	Unity Arena, Bærum; Attendance: 11,345; Referees: Lah, Sok (SLO)

=== Group F ===
Pos	Team	Pld	W	D	L	GF	GA	GD	Pts	Qualification
1	Sweden	3	2	1	0	110	80	+30	5 (Note: Sweden 29–29 Spain; goal difference: SWE 30 and ESP 28)	Main round Group III
2	Spain	3	2	1	0	99	71	+28	5	Main round Group III
3	Chile	3	1	0	2	83	99	−16	2	Main round Group III
4	Japan	3	0	0	3	67	109	−42	0	President's Cup Group II

Source: IHF
Rules for classification: 1) points; 2) head-to-head points; 3) head-to-head goal difference; 4) head-to-head number of goals scored; 5) goal difference.
Notes:

16 January 2025; 18:00	Spain	31–22	Chile	Unity Arena, Bærum; Attendance: 644; Referees: Bolic, Hurich (AUT)
16 January 2025; 18:00	Fernández 5	(17–13)	Feuchtmann, E. Salinas 5	Unity Arena, Bærum; Attendance: 644; Referees: Bolic, Hurich (AUT)
16 January 2025; 18:00	2× (suspension)	Report	1× (suspension)	Unity Arena, Bærum; Attendance: 644; Referees: Bolic, Hurich (AUT)

16 January 2025; 20:30	Sweden	39–21	Japan	Unity Arena, Bærum; Attendance: 1,685; Referees: Lah, Sok (SLO)
16 January 2025; 20:30	Karlsson 8	(17–13)	Yano, Yoshino 4	Unity Arena, Bærum; Attendance: 1,685; Referees: Lah, Sok (SLO)
16 January 2025; 20:30	1× (yellow card) 2× (suspension)	Report	1× (yellow card) 3× (suspension)	Unity Arena, Bærum; Attendance: 1,685; Referees: Lah, Sok (SLO)

18 January 2025; 18:00	Spain	39–20	Japan	Unity Arena, Bærum; Attendance: 2,880; Referees: K. Gasmi, R. Gasmi (FRA)
18 January 2025; 18:00	Serdio 7	(20–11)	Nakata 4	Unity Arena, Bærum; Attendance: 2,880; Referees: K. Gasmi, R. Gasmi (FRA)
18 January 2025; 18:00	1× (yellow card) 7× (suspension)	Report	4× (suspension) 2× (red card)	Unity Arena, Bærum; Attendance: 2,880; Referees: K. Gasmi, R. Gasmi (FRA)

18 January 2025; 20:30	Chile	30–42	Sweden	Unity Arena, Bærum; Attendance: 4,256; Referees: Lovin, Stancu (ROU)
18 January 2025; 20:30	Feuchtmann 7	(19–20)	Möller 10	Unity Arena, Bærum; Attendance: 4,256; Referees: Lovin, Stancu (ROU)
18 January 2025; 20:30	2× (yellow card) 4× (suspension)	Report	1× (yellow card) 2× (suspension)	Unity Arena, Bærum; Attendance: 4,256; Referees: Lovin, Stancu (ROU)

20 January 2025; 18:00	Japan	26–31	Chile	Unity Arena, Bærum; Attendance: 1,289; Referees: Jovandić, Sekulić (SRB)
20 January 2025; 18:00	Nakata 6	(11–14)	Feuchtmann 9	Unity Arena, Bærum; Attendance: 1,289; Referees: Jovandić, Sekulić (SRB)
20 January 2025; 18:00	4× (suspension)	Report	6× (suspension)	Unity Arena, Bærum; Attendance: 1,289; Referees: Jovandić, Sekulić (SRB)

20 January 2025; 20:30	Sweden	29–29	Spain	Unity Arena, Bærum; Attendance: 2,446; Referees: Bíró, Kiss (HUN)
20 January 2025; 20:30	Lagergren 9	(16–11)	Solé 7	Unity Arena, Bærum; Attendance: 2,446; Referees: Bíró, Kiss (HUN)
20 January 2025; 20:30	3× (suspension)	Report	1× (yellow card) 1× (suspension)	Unity Arena, Bærum; Attendance: 2,446; Referees: Bíró, Kiss (HUN)

=== Group G ===
Pos	Team	Pld	W	D	L	GF	GA	GD	Pts	Qualification
1	Iceland	3	3	0	0	97	58	+39	6	Main round Group IV
2	Slovenia	3	2	0	1	95	66	+29	4	Main round Group IV
3	Cape Verde	3	1	0	2	83	98	−15	2	Main round Group IV
4	Cuba	3	0	0	3	66	119	−53	0	President's Cup Group II

Source: IHF
Rules for classification: 1) points; 2) head-to-head points; 3) head-to-head goal difference; 4) head-to-head number of goals scored; 5) goal difference.

16 January 2025; 18:00	Slovenia	41–19	Cuba	Arena Zagreb, Zagreb; Attendance: 1,200; Referees: Belkhiri, Hamidi (ALG)
16 January 2025; 18:00	Vlah 8	(18–9)	D. García 4	Arena Zagreb, Zagreb; Attendance: 1,200; Referees: Belkhiri, Hamidi (ALG)
16 January 2025; 18:00	2× (suspension)	Report	3× (suspension)	Arena Zagreb, Zagreb; Attendance: 1,200; Referees: Belkhiri, Hamidi (ALG)

16 January 2025; 20:30	Iceland	34–21	Cape Verde	Arena Zagreb, Zagreb; Attendance: 850; Referees: A. Covalciuc, I. Covalciuc (MDA)
16 January 2025; 20:30	Þorkelsson 8	(18–8)	Pina 5	Arena Zagreb, Zagreb; Attendance: 850; Referees: A. Covalciuc, I. Covalciuc (MDA)
16 January 2025; 20:30	3× (suspension) 1× (red card)	Report	2× (suspension)	Arena Zagreb, Zagreb; Attendance: 850; Referees: A. Covalciuc, I. Covalciuc (MDA)

18 January 2025; 18:00	Cape Verde	24–36	Slovenia	Arena Zagreb, Zagreb; Attendance: 2,150; Referees: Lemes, Sosa (URU)
18 January 2025; 18:00	Pina 6	(12–18)	Vlah 8	Arena Zagreb, Zagreb; Attendance: 2,150; Referees: Lemes, Sosa (URU)
18 January 2025; 18:00	5× (suspension)	Report	1× (yellow card) 3× (suspension)	Arena Zagreb, Zagreb; Attendance: 2,150; Referees: Lemes, Sosa (URU)

18 January 2025; 20:30	Iceland	40–19	Cuba	Arena Zagreb, Zagreb; Attendance: 1,250; Referees: Ah. Gheisarian, Am. Gheisarian (IRI)
18 January 2025; 20:30	three players 5	(21–9)	Cordies 5	Arena Zagreb, Zagreb; Attendance: 1,250; Referees: Ah. Gheisarian, Am. Gheisarian (IRI)
18 January 2025; 20:30	1× (suspension)	Report	4× (suspension) 1× (red card)	Arena Zagreb, Zagreb; Attendance: 1,250; Referees: Ah. Gheisarian, Am. Gheisarian (IRI)

20 January 2025; 18:00	Cuba	28–38	Cape Verde	Arena Zagreb, Zagreb; Attendance: 650; Referees: Budzák, Záhradník (SVK)
20 January 2025; 18:00	Cordies, Vázquez 7	(14–20)	Pereira 8	Arena Zagreb, Zagreb; Attendance: 650; Referees: Budzák, Záhradník (SVK)
20 January 2025; 18:00	5× (suspension)	Report	1× (suspension)	Arena Zagreb, Zagreb; Attendance: 650; Referees: Budzák, Záhradník (SVK)

20 January 2025; 20:30	Slovenia	18–23	Iceland	Arena Zagreb, Zagreb; Attendance: 3,400; Referees: García, Marín (ESP)
20 January 2025; 20:30	Janc 4	(8–14)	Kristjánsson 7	Arena Zagreb, Zagreb; Attendance: 3,400; Referees: García, Marín (ESP)
20 January 2025; 20:30	2× (yellow card) 5× (suspension)	Report	2× (yellow card) 9× (suspension) 2× (red card)	Arena Zagreb, Zagreb; Attendance: 3,400; Referees: García, Marín (ESP)

=== Group H ===
Pos	Team	Pld	W	D	L	GF	GA	GD	Pts	Qualification
1	Egypt	3	3	0	0	102	73	+29	6	Main round Group IV
2	Croatia (H)	3	2	0	1	93	68	+25	4	Main round Group IV
3	Argentina	3	1	0	2	69	97	−28	2	Main round Group IV
4	Bahrain	3	0	0	3	71	97	−26	0	President's Cup Group II

Source: IHF
Rules for classification: 1) points; 2) head-to-head points; 3) head-to-head goal difference; 4) head-to-head number of goals scored; 5) goal difference.
(H) Hosts

15 January 2025; 18:00	Egypt	39–25	Argentina	Arena Zagreb, Zagreb; Attendance: 2,100; Referees: Jørum, Kleven (NOR)
15 January 2025; 18:00	Sanad 6	(21–11)	Moscariello 7	Arena Zagreb, Zagreb; Attendance: 2,100; Referees: Jørum, Kleven (NOR)
15 January 2025; 18:00	2× (suspension)	Report	3× (suspension) 3× (red card)	Arena Zagreb, Zagreb; Attendance: 2,100; Referees: Jørum, Kleven (NOR)

15 January 2025; 20:30	Croatia	36–22	Bahrain	Arena Zagreb, Zagreb; Attendance: 10,500; Referees: Schulze, Tönnies (GER)
15 January 2025; 20:30	Šoštarić 8	(17–9)	Eid 6	Arena Zagreb, Zagreb; Attendance: 10,500; Referees: Schulze, Tönnies (GER)
15 January 2025; 20:30	4× (suspension)	Report	2× (suspension)	Arena Zagreb, Zagreb; Attendance: 10,500; Referees: Schulze, Tönnies (GER)

17 January 2025; 18:00	Bahrain	24–35	Egypt	Arena Zagreb, Zagreb; Attendance: 2,150; Referees: García, Marín (ESP)
17 January 2025; 18:00	Mohamed 8	(11–16)	Ramadan 5	Arena Zagreb, Zagreb; Attendance: 2,150; Referees: García, Marín (ESP)
17 January 2025; 18:00	1× (suspension)	Report	2× (suspension)	Arena Zagreb, Zagreb; Attendance: 2,150; Referees: García, Marín (ESP)

17 January 2025; 20:30	Croatia	33–18	Argentina	Arena Zagreb, Zagreb; Attendance: 15,650; Referees: Kurtagic, Wetterwik (SWE)
17 January 2025; 20:30	Glavaš, Šipić 5	(18–7)	Martínez 3	Arena Zagreb, Zagreb; Attendance: 15,650; Referees: Kurtagic, Wetterwik (SWE)
17 January 2025; 20:30	2× (yellow card) 1× (suspension)	Report	1× (yellow card) 3× (suspension)	Arena Zagreb, Zagreb; Attendance: 15,650; Referees: Kurtagic, Wetterwik (SWE)

19 January 2025; 18:00	Argentina	26–25	Bahrain	Arena Zagreb, Zagreb; Attendance: 2,750; Referees: Hansen, Madsen (DEN)
19 January 2025; 18:00	Martínez 10	(16–11)	Habib 6	Arena Zagreb, Zagreb; Attendance: 2,750; Referees: Hansen, Madsen (DEN)
19 January 2025; 18:00	1× (yellow card) 2× (suspension)	Report	2× (suspension)	Arena Zagreb, Zagreb; Attendance: 2,750; Referees: Hansen, Madsen (DEN)

19 January 2025; 20:30	Egypt	28–24	Croatia	Arena Zagreb, Zagreb; Attendance: 15,600; Referees: Horáček, Novotný (CZE)
19 January 2025; 20:30	Omar 6	(14–11)	Martinović 6	Arena Zagreb, Zagreb; Attendance: 15,600; Referees: Horáček, Novotný (CZE)
19 January 2025; 20:30	1× (yellow card) 7× (suspension)	Report	2× (yellow card) 2× (suspension)	Arena Zagreb, Zagreb; Attendance: 15,600; Referees: Horáček, Novotný (CZE)

== President's Cup ==
=== Group I ===
Pos	Team	Pld	W	D	L	GF	GA	GD	Pts	Qualification
1	Poland	3	3	0	0	120	92	+28	6	25th place game
2	Kuwait	3	2	0	1	96	97	−1	4	27th place game
3	Algeria	3	1	0	2	95	99	−4	2	29th place game
4	Guinea	3	0	0	3	75	98	−23	0	31st place game

Source: IHF
Rules for classification: 1) points; 2) head-to-head points; 3) head-to-head goal difference; 4) head-to-head number of goals scored; 5) goal difference.

21 January 2025; 15:30	Kuwait	26–24	Guinea	Žatika Sport Centre, Poreč; Attendance: 154; Referees: García, Paolantoni (ARG)
21 January 2025; 15:30	Al-Dawani 8	(15–11)	Lebon 7	Žatika Sport Centre, Poreč; Attendance: 154; Referees: García, Paolantoni (ARG)
21 January 2025; 15:30	1× (suspension) 1× (red card)	Report	3× (suspension) 1× (red card)	Žatika Sport Centre, Poreč; Attendance: 154; Referees: García, Paolantoni (ARG)

21 January 2025; 18:00	Poland	38–32	Algeria	Žatika Sport Centre, Poreč; Attendance: 168; Referees: Lemes, Sosa (URU)
21 January 2025; 18:00	Jędraszczyk 8	(19–14)	three players 6	Žatika Sport Centre, Poreč; Attendance: 168; Referees: Lemes, Sosa (URU)
21 January 2025; 18:00	2× (yellow card) 2× (suspension)	Report	2× (suspension) 1× (red card)	Žatika Sport Centre, Poreč; Attendance: 168; Referees: Lemes, Sosa (URU)

23 January 2025; 15:30	Algeria	32–23	Guinea	Žatika Sport Centre, Poreč; Attendance: 72; Referees: García, Paolantoni (ARG)
23 January 2025; 15:30	Khermouche 7	(14–9)	Pasquet 5	Žatika Sport Centre, Poreč; Attendance: 72; Referees: García, Paolantoni (ARG)
23 January 2025; 15:30	2× (suspension)	Report	3× (suspension)	Žatika Sport Centre, Poreč; Attendance: 72; Referees: García, Paolantoni (ARG)

23 January 2025; 18:00	Poland	42–32	Kuwait	Žatika Sport Centre, Poreč; Attendance: 125; Referees: Ah. Gheisarian, Am. Gheisarian (IRI)
23 January 2025; 18:00	Paterek 9	(21–15)	Al-Dawani 8	Žatika Sport Centre, Poreč; Attendance: 125; Referees: Ah. Gheisarian, Am. Gheisarian (IRI)
23 January 2025; 18:00	1× (yellow card) 4× (suspension)	Report	3× (suspension)	Žatika Sport Centre, Poreč; Attendance: 125; Referees: Ah. Gheisarian, Am. Gheisarian (IRI)

25 January 2025; 15:30	Algeria	31–38	Kuwait	Žatika Sport Centre, Poreč; Attendance: 234; Referees: Lemes, Sosa (URU)
25 January 2025; 15:30	Saker 10	(14–18)	Al-Dawani 13	Žatika Sport Centre, Poreč; Attendance: 234; Referees: Lemes, Sosa (URU)
25 January 2025; 15:30	3× (suspension) 1× (red card)	Report	3× (suspension) 1× (red card)	Žatika Sport Centre, Poreč; Attendance: 234; Referees: Lemes, Sosa (URU)

25 January 2025; 18:00	Guinea	28–40	Poland	Žatika Sport Centre, Poreč; Attendance: 356; Referees: Bolic, Hurich (AUT)
25 January 2025; 18:00	Pasquet 8	(13–21)	Czapliński 7	Žatika Sport Centre, Poreč; Attendance: 356; Referees: Bolic, Hurich (AUT)
25 January 2025; 18:00	1× (suspension)	Report	4× (suspension)	Žatika Sport Centre, Poreč; Attendance: 356; Referees: Bolic, Hurich (AUT)

=== Group II ===
Pos	Team	Pld	W	D	L	GF	GA	GD	Pts	Qualification
1	United States	3	3	0	0	84	79	+5	6	25th place game
2	Japan	3	2	0	1	88	77	+11	4	27th place game
3	Bahrain	3	1	0	2	94	87	+7	2	29th place game
4	Cuba	3	0	0	3	75	98	−23	0	31st place game

Source: IHF
Rules for classification: 1) points; 2) head-to-head points; 3) head-to-head goal difference; 4) head-to-head number of goals scored; 5) goal difference.

22 January 2025; 15:30	Cuba	26–39	Bahrain	Žatika Sport Centre, Poreč; Attendance: 88; Referees: Ah. Gheisarian, Am. Gheisarian (IRI)
22 January 2025; 15:30	three players 4	(12–17)	Al-Zaimoor 6	Žatika Sport Centre, Poreč; Attendance: 88; Referees: Ah. Gheisarian, Am. Gheisarian (IRI)
22 January 2025; 15:30	3× (suspension)	Report	2× (suspension)	Žatika Sport Centre, Poreč; Attendance: 88; Referees: Ah. Gheisarian, Am. Gheisarian (IRI)

22 January 2025; 18:00	United States	27–25	Japan	Žatika Sport Centre, Poreč; Attendance: 104; Referees: Bolic, Hurich (AUT)
22 January 2025; 18:00	Corning, Hoddersen 7	(15–13)	Yoshino 8	Žatika Sport Centre, Poreč; Attendance: 104; Referees: Bolic, Hurich (AUT)
22 January 2025; 18:00	3× (suspension)	Report	3× (suspension)	Žatika Sport Centre, Poreč; Attendance: 104; Referees: Bolic, Hurich (AUT)

24 January 2025; 15:30	Japan	31–27	Bahrain	Žatika Sport Centre, Poreč; Attendance: 150; Referees: Mikelić, Parađina (CRO)
24 January 2025; 15:30	Yoshino 6	(13–13)	Mohamed 6	Žatika Sport Centre, Poreč; Attendance: 150; Referees: Mikelić, Parađina (CRO)
24 January 2025; 15:30	1× (yellow card) 3× (suspension)	Report	3× (suspension)	Žatika Sport Centre, Poreč; Attendance: 150; Referees: Mikelić, Parađina (CRO)

24 January 2025; 18:00	United States	27–26	Cuba	Žatika Sport Centre, Poreč; Attendance: 211; Referees: Lemes, Sosa (URU)
24 January 2025; 18:00	Hoddersen 7	(14–15)	D. García 8	Žatika Sport Centre, Poreč; Attendance: 211; Referees: Lemes, Sosa (URU)
24 January 2025; 18:00	3× (suspension) 1× (red card)	Report	7× (suspension)	Žatika Sport Centre, Poreč; Attendance: 211; Referees: Lemes, Sosa (URU)

26 January 2025; 15:30	Japan	32–23	Cuba	Žatika Sport Centre, Poreč; Attendance: 210; Referees: Ah. Gheisarian, Am. Gheisarian (IRI)
26 January 2025; 15:30	Arase 7	(14–11)	Rodríguez 8	Žatika Sport Centre, Poreč; Attendance: 210; Referees: Ah. Gheisarian, Am. Gheisarian (IRI)
26 January 2025; 15:30	4× (suspension)	Report	3× (suspension)	Žatika Sport Centre, Poreč; Attendance: 210; Referees: Ah. Gheisarian, Am. Gheisarian (IRI)

26 January 2025; 18:00	Bahrain	28–30	United States	Žatika Sport Centre, Poreč; Attendance: 317; Referees: García, Paolantoni (ARG)
26 January 2025; 18:00	Qambar 8	(14–15)	Corning, Hoddersen 7	Žatika Sport Centre, Poreč; Attendance: 317; Referees: García, Paolantoni (ARG)
26 January 2025; 18:00	1× (yellow card) 4× (suspension)	Report	2× (suspension)	Žatika Sport Centre, Poreč; Attendance: 317; Referees: García, Paolantoni (ARG)

=== 31st place game ===
28 January 2025
13:00
Guinea
33–31
Cuba
Žatika Sport Centre, Poreč
Attendance: 91
Referees: Bolic, Hurich (AUT)
Lebon 8
(16–16)
Rodríguez 10
2× (suspension)
Report
1× (suspension)

FT: 28–28 Pen: 5–3 (Note: Even though the outcome of the penalty shoot-out was decided after Guinea's fourth throw, bringing the score to 4–2 with one throw left for each team, the teams were required to finish five throws each. Both teams scored their final throw.)

=== 29th place game ===
28 January 2025; 15:30	Algeria	26–29	Bahrain	Žatika Sport Centre, Poreč; Attendance: 110; Referees: Lemes, Sosa (URU)
28 January 2025; 15:30	four players 4	(18–17)	Mohamed 9	Žatika Sport Centre, Poreč; Attendance: 110; Referees: Lemes, Sosa (URU)
28 January 2025; 15:30	1× (suspension)	Report	1× (yellow card) 1× (suspension)	Žatika Sport Centre, Poreč; Attendance: 110; Referees: Lemes, Sosa (URU)

=== 27th place game ===
28 January 2025; 18:00	Kuwait	37–32	Japan	Žatika Sport Centre, Poreč; Attendance: 65; Referees: García, Paolantoni (ARG)
28 January 2025; 18:00	Al-Dawani 8	(17–16)	Fujisaka, Yoshino 6	Žatika Sport Centre, Poreč; Attendance: 65; Referees: García, Paolantoni (ARG)
28 January 2025; 18:00	1× (yellow card) 2× (suspension)	Report	1× (suspension)	Žatika Sport Centre, Poreč; Attendance: 65; Referees: García, Paolantoni (ARG)

=== 25th place game ===
28 January 2025
20:30
Poland
24–22
United States
Žatika Sport Centre, Poreč
Attendance: 120
Referees: Belkhiri, Hamidi (ALG)
Jędraszczyk 4
(11–13)
Fofana 5
1× (yellow card) 2× (suspension)
Report
3× (suspension)

FT: 21–21 Pen: 3–1

== Main round ==
=== Group I ===
Results between advancing teams from Group A and Group B were carried over.

Pos	Team	Pld	W	D	L	GF	GA	GD	Pts	Qualification
1	Denmark (H)	5	5	0	0	178	121	+57	10	Quarterfinals
2	Germany	5	4	0	1	155	137	+18	8	Quarterfinals
3	Switzerland	5	2	1	2	144	138	+6	5	
4	Italy	5	2	0	3	129	149	−20	4	
5	Czech Republic	5	1	1	3	111	125	−14	3	
6	Tunisia	5	0	0	5	117	164	−47	0	

Source: IHF
Rules for classification: 1) points; 2) head-to-head points; 3) head-to-head goal difference; 4) head-to-head number of goals scored; 5) goal difference.
(H) Hosts

21 January 2025; 15:30	Switzerland	37–26	Tunisia	Jyske Bank Boxen, Herning; Attendance: 4,040; Referees: Mikelić, Parađina (CRO)
21 January 2025; 15:30	Maros, Rubin 7	(20–11)	Jbeli 11	Jyske Bank Boxen, Herning; Attendance: 4,040; Referees: Mikelić, Parađina (CRO)
21 January 2025; 15:30	1× (yellow card) 5× (suspension) 1× (red card)	Report	5× (suspension)	Jyske Bank Boxen, Herning; Attendance: 4,040; Referees: Mikelić, Parađina (CRO)

21 January 2025; 18:00	Czech Republic	18–25	Italy	Jyske Bank Boxen, Herning; Attendance: 10,601; Referees: K. Gasmi, R. Gasmi (FRA)
21 January 2025; 18:00	Solák 5	(9–14)	Parisini 5	Jyske Bank Boxen, Herning; Attendance: 10,601; Referees: K. Gasmi, R. Gasmi (FRA)
21 January 2025; 18:00	2× (suspension)	Report	4× (suspension)	Jyske Bank Boxen, Herning; Attendance: 10,601; Referees: K. Gasmi, R. Gasmi (FRA)

21 January 2025; 20:30	Denmark	40–30	Germany	Jyske Bank Boxen, Herning; Attendance: 14,466; Referees: Nachevski, Nikolov (MKD)
21 January 2025; 20:30	Gidsel 10	(24–18)	Kastening, Köster 6	Jyske Bank Boxen, Herning; Attendance: 14,466; Referees: Nachevski, Nikolov (MKD)
21 January 2025; 20:30	1× (yellow card) 2× (suspension)	Report	4× (suspension)	Jyske Bank Boxen, Herning; Attendance: 14,466; Referees: Nachevski, Nikolov (MKD)

23 January 2025; 15:30	Tunisia	26–32	Czech Republic	Jyske Bank Boxen, Herning; Attendance: 4,121; Referees: Lovin, Stancu (ROU)
23 January 2025; 15:30	Ben Abdallah 9	(12–19)	Mořkovský 6	Jyske Bank Boxen, Herning; Attendance: 4,121; Referees: Lovin, Stancu (ROU)
23 January 2025; 15:30	1× (yellow card) 4× (suspension) 1× (red card)	Report	1× (yellow card) 8× (suspension)	Jyske Bank Boxen, Herning; Attendance: 4,121; Referees: Lovin, Stancu (ROU)

23 January 2025; 18:00	Italy	27–34	Germany	Jyske Bank Boxen, Herning; Attendance: 11,399; Referees: Bíró, Kiss (HUN)
23 January 2025; 18:00	Prantner 8	(13–15)	Kastening 6	Jyske Bank Boxen, Herning; Attendance: 11,399; Referees: Bíró, Kiss (HUN)
23 January 2025; 18:00	3× (suspension)	Report	1× (yellow card) 3× (suspension)	Jyske Bank Boxen, Herning; Attendance: 11,399; Referees: Bíró, Kiss (HUN)

23 January 2025; 20:30	Denmark	39–28	Switzerland	Jyske Bank Boxen, Herning; Attendance: 14,644; Referees: Grillo, Lenci (ARG)
23 January 2025; 20:30	Andersson 8	(18–11)	Aellen, Leopold 5	Jyske Bank Boxen, Herning; Attendance: 14,644; Referees: Grillo, Lenci (ARG)
23 January 2025; 20:30	1× (yellow card) 1× (suspension)	Report	1× (yellow card) 3× (suspension)	Jyske Bank Boxen, Herning; Attendance: 14,644; Referees: Grillo, Lenci (ARG)

25 January 2025; 15:30	Italy	25–33	Switzerland	Jyske Bank Boxen, Herning; Attendance: 11,415; Referees: K. Gasmi, R. Gasmi (FRA)
25 January 2025; 15:30	Prantner 7	(9–14)	Rubin 9	Jyske Bank Boxen, Herning; Attendance: 11,415; Referees: K. Gasmi, R. Gasmi (FRA)
25 January 2025; 15:30	1× (yellow card) 4× (suspension)	Report	1× (yellow card) 4× (suspension)	Jyske Bank Boxen, Herning; Attendance: 11,415; Referees: K. Gasmi, R. Gasmi (FRA)

25 January 2025; 18:00	Czech Republic	22–28	Denmark	Jyske Bank Boxen, Herning; Attendance: 14,773; Referees: Jovandić, Sekulić (SRB)
25 January 2025; 18:00	Bláha 5	(10–12)	Gidsel 10	Jyske Bank Boxen, Herning; Attendance: 14,773; Referees: Jovandić, Sekulić (SRB)
25 January 2025; 18:00	1× (yellow card) 4× (suspension) 1× (red card)	Report	1× (suspension)	Jyske Bank Boxen, Herning; Attendance: 14,773; Referees: Jovandić, Sekulić (SRB)

25 January 2025; 20:30	Germany	31–19	Tunisia	Jyske Bank Boxen, Herning; Attendance: 6,534; Referees: Grillo, Lenci (ARG)
25 January 2025; 20:30	Grgić 11	(18–8)	Zariat 4	Jyske Bank Boxen, Herning; Attendance: 6,534; Referees: Grillo, Lenci (ARG)
25 January 2025; 20:30	1× (yellow card) 1× (suspension)	Report	3× (suspension)	Jyske Bank Boxen, Herning; Attendance: 6,534; Referees: Grillo, Lenci (ARG)

=== Group II ===
Results between advancing teams from Group C and Group D were carried over.

Pos	Team	Pld	W	D	L	GF	GA	GD	Pts	Qualification
1	France	5	5	0	0	176	129	+47	10	Quarterfinals
2	Hungary	5	3	1	1	151	145	+6	7	Quarterfinals
3	Netherlands	5	2	1	2	172	177	−5	5	
4	North Macedonia	5	1	2	2	152	159	−7	4 (Note: Austria 29–29 North Macedonia; goal difference: MKD -7 and AUT -9)	
5	Austria	5	1	2	2	147	156	−9	4	
6	Qatar	5	0	0	5	139	171	−32	0	

Source: IHF
Rules for classification: 1) points; 2) head-to-head points; 3) head-to-head goal difference; 4) head-to-head number of goals scored; 5) goal difference.
Notes:

21 January 2025; 15:30	Austria	29–29	North Macedonia	Varaždin Arena, Varaždin; Attendance: 1,000; Referees: Horáček, Novotný (CZE)
21 January 2025; 15:30	Hutecek 6	(14–13)	Mitev 6	Varaždin Arena, Varaždin; Attendance: 1,000; Referees: Horáček, Novotný (CZE)
21 January 2025; 15:30	3× (suspension)	Report	1× (yellow card) 1× (suspension)	Varaždin Arena, Varaždin; Attendance: 1,000; Referees: Horáček, Novotný (CZE)

21 January 2025; 18:00	Qatar	37–38	Netherlands	Varaždin Arena, Varaždin; Attendance: 1,500; Referees: Kurtagic, Wetterwik (SWE)
21 January 2025; 18:00	Marzo 11	(19–17)	Baijens 9	Varaždin Arena, Varaždin; Attendance: 1,500; Referees: Kurtagic, Wetterwik (SWE)
21 January 2025; 18:00	2× (yellow card) 5× (suspension) 1× (red card)	Report	1× (yellow card) 2× (suspension) 1× (red card)	Varaždin Arena, Varaždin; Attendance: 1,500; Referees: Kurtagic, Wetterwik (SWE)

21 January 2025; 21:00	Hungary	30–37	France	Varaždin Arena, Varaždin; Attendance: 1,500; Referees: Schulze, Tönnies (GER)
21 January 2025; 21:00	Lékai 5	(15–23)	Mem 6	Varaždin Arena, Varaždin; Attendance: 1,500; Referees: Schulze, Tönnies (GER)
21 January 2025; 21:00	1× (yellow card) 5× (suspension)	Report	1× (suspension)	Varaždin Arena, Varaždin; Attendance: 1,500; Referees: Schulze, Tönnies (GER)

23 January 2025; 15:30	North Macedonia	39–34	Qatar	Varaždin Arena, Varaždin; Attendance: 500; Referees: García, Marín (ESP)
23 January 2025; 15:30	Kuzmanovski, Peshevski 6	(21–17)	Marzo 12	Varaždin Arena, Varaždin; Attendance: 500; Referees: García, Marín (ESP)
23 January 2025; 15:30	5× (suspension) 1× (red card)	Report	6× (suspension) 1× (red card)	Varaždin Arena, Varaždin; Attendance: 500; Referees: García, Marín (ESP)

23 January 2025; 18:00	Netherlands	28–35	France	Varaždin Arena, Varaždin; Attendance: 2,000; Referees: Álvarez, Bustamante (ESP)
23 January 2025; 18:00	Baijens 6	(13–19)	Mem, Richardson 7	Varaždin Arena, Varaždin; Attendance: 2,000; Referees: Álvarez, Bustamante (ESP)
23 January 2025; 18:00	1× (yellow card) 2× (suspension)	Report	1× (yellow card) 4× (suspension)	Varaždin Arena, Varaždin; Attendance: 2,000; Referees: Álvarez, Bustamante (ESP)

23 January 2025; 20:30	Hungary	29–26	Austria	Varaždin Arena, Varaždin; Attendance: 2,600; Referees: Kurtagic, Wetterwik (SWE)
23 January 2025; 20:30	Rodríguez Álvarez 8	(12–13)	Frimmel 6	Varaždin Arena, Varaždin; Attendance: 2,600; Referees: Kurtagic, Wetterwik (SWE)
23 January 2025; 20:30	3× (suspension)	Report	1× (yellow card) 3× (suspension)	Varaždin Arena, Varaždin; Attendance: 2,600; Referees: Kurtagic, Wetterwik (SWE)

25 January 2025; 15:30	Netherlands	37–37	Austria	Varaždin Arena, Varaždin; Attendance: 1,000; Referees: Hansen, Madsen (DEN)
25 January 2025; 15:30	Steins 7	(19–17)	Frimmel, Wagner 7	Varaždin Arena, Varaždin; Attendance: 1,000; Referees: Hansen, Madsen (DEN)
25 January 2025; 15:30	1× (yellow card) 1× (suspension)	Report	2× (suspension)	Varaždin Arena, Varaždin; Attendance: 1,000; Referees: Hansen, Madsen (DEN)

25 January 2025; 18:00	Qatar	23–29	Hungary	Varaždin Arena, Varaždin; Attendance: 2,200; Referees: Horáček, Novotný (CZE)
25 January 2025; 18:00	Marković 6	(12–12)	Imre 9	Varaždin Arena, Varaždin; Attendance: 2,200; Referees: Horáček, Novotný (CZE)
25 January 2025; 18:00	7× (suspension)	Report	3× (suspension)	Varaždin Arena, Varaždin; Attendance: 2,200; Referees: Horáček, Novotný (CZE)

25 January 2025; 20:30	France	32–25	North Macedonia	Varaždin Arena, Varaždin; Attendance: 2,300; Referees: Jørum, Kleven (NOR)
25 January 2025; 20:30	Mem 8	(18–14)	Kuzmanovski 8	Varaždin Arena, Varaždin; Attendance: 2,300; Referees: Jørum, Kleven (NOR)
25 January 2025; 20:30	1× (suspension) 1× (red card)	Report	4× (suspension)	Varaždin Arena, Varaždin; Attendance: 2,300; Referees: Jørum, Kleven (NOR)

=== Group III ===
Results between advancing teams from Group E and Group F were carried over.

Pos	Team	Pld	W	D	L	GF	GA	GD	Pts	Qualification
1	Portugal	5	4	1	0	179	148	+31	9	Quarterfinals
2	Brazil	5	4	0	1	136	129	+7	8	Quarterfinals
3	Norway (H)	5	3	0	2	147	130	+17	6	
4	Sweden	5	1	2	2	156	152	+4	4	
5	Spain	5	1	1	3	138	137	+1	3	
6	Chile	5	0	0	5	126	186	−60	0	

Source: IHF
Rules for classification: 1) points; 2) head-to-head points; 3) head-to-head goal difference; 4) head-to-head number of goals scored; 5) goal difference.
(H) Hosts

22 January 2025; 15:30	Brazil	28–24	Chile	Unity Arena, Bærum; Attendance: 857; Referees: Pavićević, Ražnatović (MNE)
22 January 2025; 15:30	Langaro 8	(13–10)	E. Salinas 7	Unity Arena, Bærum; Attendance: 857; Referees: Pavićević, Ražnatović (MNE)
22 January 2025; 15:30	2× (suspension)	Report	1× (yellow card) 4× (suspension)	Unity Arena, Bærum; Attendance: 857; Referees: Pavićević, Ražnatović (MNE)

22 January 2025; 18:00	Sweden	37–37	Portugal	Unity Arena, Bærum; Attendance: 3,813; Referees: Lah, Sok (SLO)
22 January 2025; 18:00	Lagergren 7	(18–18)	Frade 7	Unity Arena, Bærum; Attendance: 3,813; Referees: Lah, Sok (SLO)
22 January 2025; 18:00	1× (yellow card) 2× (suspension) 1× (red card)	Report	1× (yellow card) 3× (suspension)	Unity Arena, Bærum; Attendance: 3,813; Referees: Lah, Sok (SLO)

22 January 2025; 20:30	Norway	25–24	Spain	Unity Arena, Bærum; Attendance: 5,508; Referees: A. Konjičanin, D. Konjičanin (BIH)
22 January 2025; 20:30	Grøndahl 7	(10–13)	Garciandia 6	Unity Arena, Bærum; Attendance: 5,508; Referees: A. Konjičanin, D. Konjičanin (BIH)
22 January 2025; 20:30	2× (suspension)	Report	2× (suspension)	Unity Arena, Bærum; Attendance: 5,508; Referees: A. Konjičanin, D. Konjičanin (BIH)

24 January 2025; 15:30	Spain	29–35	Portugal	Unity Arena, Bærum; Attendance: 2,865; Referees: Nachevski, Nikolov (MKD)
24 January 2025; 15:30	Fernández 6	(16–15)	F. Costa 8	Unity Arena, Bærum; Attendance: 2,865; Referees: Nachevski, Nikolov (MKD)
24 January 2025; 15:30	1× (yellow card) 6× (suspension)	Report	1× (yellow card) 4× (suspension)	Unity Arena, Bærum; Attendance: 2,865; Referees: Nachevski, Nikolov (MKD)

24 January 2025; 18:00	Sweden	24–27	Brazil	Unity Arena, Bærum; Attendance: 5,831; Referees: A. Konjičanin, D. Konjičanin (BIH)
24 January 2025; 18:00	Carlsbogård 6	(9–14)	Langaro, Monte 4	Unity Arena, Bærum; Attendance: 5,831; Referees: A. Konjičanin, D. Konjičanin (BIH)
24 January 2025; 18:00	1× (suspension) 1× (red card)	Report	1× (yellow card) 3× (suspension) 1× (red card)	Unity Arena, Bærum; Attendance: 5,831; Referees: A. Konjičanin, D. Konjičanin (BIH)

24 January 2025; 20:30	Chile	22–39	Norway	Unity Arena, Bærum; Attendance: 7,809; Referees: A. Covalciuc, I. Covalciuc (MDA)
24 January 2025; 20:30	Feuchtmann 6	(11–17)	Lien 10	Unity Arena, Bærum; Attendance: 7,809; Referees: A. Covalciuc, I. Covalciuc (MDA)
24 January 2025; 20:30	1× (yellow card) 4× (suspension)	Report	3× (suspension)	Unity Arena, Bærum; Attendance: 7,809; Referees: A. Covalciuc, I. Covalciuc (MDA)

26 January 2025; 15:30	Portugal	46–28	Chile	Unity Arena, Bærum; Attendance: 1,924; Referees: A. Konjičanin, D. Konjičanin (BIH)
26 January 2025; 15:30	F. Costa 9	(22–17)	Feuchtmann 8	Unity Arena, Bærum; Attendance: 1,924; Referees: A. Konjičanin, D. Konjičanin (BIH)
26 January 2025; 15:30	4× (suspension)	Report	3× (suspension) 1× (red card)	Unity Arena, Bærum; Attendance: 1,924; Referees: A. Konjičanin, D. Konjičanin (BIH)

26 January 2025; 18:00	Spain	25–26	Brazil	Unity Arena, Bærum; Attendance: 4,878; Referees: Lah, Sok (SLO)
26 January 2025; 18:00	P. Cikusa, Romero 4	(13–14)	Hackbarth 6	Unity Arena, Bærum; Attendance: 4,878; Referees: Lah, Sok (SLO)
26 January 2025; 18:00	1× (yellow card) 2× (suspension)	Report	3× (suspension)	Unity Arena, Bærum; Attendance: 4,878; Referees: Lah, Sok (SLO)

26 January 2025; 20:30	Norway	29–24	Sweden	Unity Arena, Bærum; Attendance: 7,844; Referees: Pavićević, Ražnatović (MNE)
26 January 2025; 20:30	Aar 9	(16–11)	Johansson 7	Unity Arena, Bærum; Attendance: 7,844; Referees: Pavićević, Ražnatović (MNE)
26 January 2025; 20:30	1× (yellow card) 5× (suspension)	Report	2× (suspension)	Unity Arena, Bærum; Attendance: 7,844; Referees: Pavićević, Ražnatović (MNE)

=== Group IV ===
Results between advancing teams from Group G and Group H were carried over.

Pos	Team	Pld	W	D	L	GF	GA	GD	Pts	Qualification
1	Croatia (H)	5	4	0	1	162	122	+40	8 (Note: Croatia 2 Pts, +2 GD, Egypt 2 Pts, +1 GD, Iceland 2 Pts, −3 GD)	Quarterfinals
2	Egypt	5	4	0	1	148	125	+23	8	Quarterfinals
3	Iceland	5	4	0	1	140	116	+24	8	
4	Slovenia	5	2	0	3	139	125	+14	4	
5	Argentina	5	1	0	4	117	162	−45	2	
6	Cape Verde	5	0	0	5	119	175	−56	0	

Source: IHF
Rules for classification: 1) points; 2) head-to-head points; 3) head-to-head goal difference; 4) head-to-head number of goals scored; 5) goal difference.
(H) Hosts
Notes:

22 January 2025; 15:30	Slovenia	34–23	Argentina	Arena Zagreb, Zagreb; Attendance: 850; Referees: Belkhiri, Hamidi (ALG)
22 January 2025; 15:30	Kljun 5	(15–8)	Gull, Martínez 4	Arena Zagreb, Zagreb; Attendance: 850; Referees: Belkhiri, Hamidi (ALG)
22 January 2025; 15:30	3× (suspension)	Report	1× (yellow card) 5× (suspension)	Arena Zagreb, Zagreb; Attendance: 850; Referees: Belkhiri, Hamidi (ALG)

22 January 2025; 18:00	Cape Verde	24–44	Croatia	Arena Zagreb, Zagreb; Attendance: 8,450; Referees: Hansen, Madsen (DEN)
22 January 2025; 18:00	Pina 9	(11–24)	Šoštarić 9	Arena Zagreb, Zagreb; Attendance: 8,450; Referees: Hansen, Madsen (DEN)
22 January 2025; 18:00	1× (suspension)	Report	1× (yellow card) 3× (suspension)	Arena Zagreb, Zagreb; Attendance: 8,450; Referees: Hansen, Madsen (DEN)

22 January 2025; 20:30	Egypt	24–27	Iceland	Arena Zagreb, Zagreb; Attendance: 4,350; Referees: Schulze, Tönnies (GER)
22 January 2025; 20:30	Zein 8	(9–13)	Kristjánsson 9	Arena Zagreb, Zagreb; Attendance: 4,350; Referees: Schulze, Tönnies (GER)
22 January 2025; 20:30	2× (suspension)	Report	2× (yellow card) 4× (suspension)	Arena Zagreb, Zagreb; Attendance: 4,350; Referees: Schulze, Tönnies (GER)

24 January 2025; 15:30	Argentina	30–26	Cape Verde	Arena Zagreb, Zagreb; Attendance: 450; Referees: Kurtagic, Wetterwik (SWE)
24 January 2025; 15:30	three players 5	(14–14)	Pina 10	Arena Zagreb, Zagreb; Attendance: 450; Referees: Kurtagic, Wetterwik (SWE)
24 January 2025; 15:30	1× (yellow card) 4× (suspension)	Report	2× (suspension)	Arena Zagreb, Zagreb; Attendance: 450; Referees: Kurtagic, Wetterwik (SWE)

24 January 2025; 18:00	Egypt	26–25	Slovenia	Arena Zagreb, Zagreb; Attendance: 5,250; Referees: Jørum, Kleven (NOR)
24 January 2025; 18:00	El-Deraa 6	(16–14)	Janc 8	Arena Zagreb, Zagreb; Attendance: 5,250; Referees: Jørum, Kleven (NOR)
24 January 2025; 18:00	4× (suspension)	Report	1× (yellow card) 3× (suspension)	Arena Zagreb, Zagreb; Attendance: 5,250; Referees: Jørum, Kleven (NOR)

24 January 2025; 20:30	Croatia	32–26	Iceland	Arena Zagreb, Zagreb; Attendance: 15,600; Referees: García, Marín (ESP)
24 January 2025; 20:30	Martinović 8	(20–12)	Kristjánsson 5	Arena Zagreb, Zagreb; Attendance: 15,600; Referees: García, Marín (ESP)
24 January 2025; 20:30	2× (yellow card) 1× (suspension)	Report	1× (yellow card) 3× (suspension)	Arena Zagreb, Zagreb; Attendance: 15,600; Referees: García, Marín (ESP)

26 January 2025; 15:30	Iceland	30–21	Argentina	Arena Zagreb, Zagreb; Attendance: 1,550; Referees: Belkhiri, Hamidi (ALG)
26 January 2025; 15:30	Ríkharðsson 7	(15–10)	Martínez 6	Arena Zagreb, Zagreb; Attendance: 1,550; Referees: Belkhiri, Hamidi (ALG)
26 January 2025; 15:30	4× (suspension)	Report	1× (yellow card) 2× (suspension)	Arena Zagreb, Zagreb; Attendance: 1,550; Referees: Belkhiri, Hamidi (ALG)

26 January 2025; 18:00	Cape Verde	24–31	Egypt	Arena Zagreb, Zagreb; Attendance: 1,250; Referees: Álvarez, Bustamante (ESP)
26 January 2025; 18:00	Pina 6	(13–14)	Omar 11	Arena Zagreb, Zagreb; Attendance: 1,250; Referees: Álvarez, Bustamante (ESP)
26 January 2025; 18:00	4× (suspension)	Report	2× (suspension)	Arena Zagreb, Zagreb; Attendance: 1,250; Referees: Álvarez, Bustamante (ESP)

26 January 2025; 20:30	Croatia	29–26	Slovenia	Arena Zagreb, Zagreb; Attendance: 15,600; Referees: Horáček, Novotný (CZE)
26 January 2025; 20:30	three players 5	(15–15)	Vlah 5	Arena Zagreb, Zagreb; Attendance: 15,600; Referees: Horáček, Novotný (CZE)
26 January 2025; 20:30	2× (suspension)	Report	4× (suspension)	Arena Zagreb, Zagreb; Attendance: 15,600; Referees: Horáček, Novotný (CZE)

== Final round ==
=== Bracket ===
Quarter-finals
28 January – Zagreb
France	34
Egypt	33
28 January – Zagreb
Croatia	31
Hungary	30
29 January – Bærum
Denmark	33
Brazil	21
29 January – Bærum
Portugal (ET)	31
Germany	30

Semi-finals
30 January – Zagreb
France	28
Croatia	31
31 January – Bærum
Denmark	40
Portugal	27

Final
2 February – Bærum
Croatia	26
Denmark	32
Third place
2 February – Bærum
France	35
Portugal	34

=== Quarterfinals ===
28 January 2025; 18:00	Croatia	31–30	Hungary	Arena Zagreb, Zagreb; Attendance: 15,600; Referees: García, Marín (ESP)
28 January 2025; 18:00	Glavaš 6	(16–16)	Ilić 8	Arena Zagreb, Zagreb; Attendance: 15,600; Referees: García, Marín (ESP)
28 January 2025; 18:00	2× (yellow card) 5× (suspension)	Report	2× (suspension) 1× (red card)	Arena Zagreb, Zagreb; Attendance: 15,600; Referees: García, Marín (ESP)

28 January 2025; 21:00	France	34–33	Egypt	Arena Zagreb, Zagreb; Attendance: 5,850; Referees: Nachevski, Nikolov (MKD)
28 January 2025; 21:00	Mem, Remili 6	(18–14)	Hesham 8	Arena Zagreb, Zagreb; Attendance: 5,850; Referees: Nachevski, Nikolov (MKD)
28 January 2025; 21:00	1× (yellow card) 3× (suspension) 1× (red card)	Report	2× (suspension)	Arena Zagreb, Zagreb; Attendance: 5,850; Referees: Nachevski, Nikolov (MKD)

29 January 2025; 17:30	Denmark	33–21	Brazil	Unity Arena, Bærum; Attendance: 5,922; Referees: Bíró, Kiss (HUN)
29 January 2025; 17:30	three players 6	(15–12)	Carvalho 7	Unity Arena, Bærum; Attendance: 5,922; Referees: Bíró, Kiss (HUN)
29 January 2025; 17:30	3× (suspension)	Report	1× (yellow card) 5× (suspension)	Unity Arena, Bærum; Attendance: 5,922; Referees: Bíró, Kiss (HUN)

29 January 2025
20:30
Portugal
31–30 (ET)
Germany
Unity Arena, Bærum
Attendance: 7,475
Referees: Jørum, Kleven (NOR)
F. Costa 8
(13–9)
Zerbe 9
1× (yellow card) 4× (suspension) 1× (red card)
Report
1× (yellow card) 5× (suspension)

FT: 26–26 ET: 5–4

=== Semifinals ===
30 January 2025; 21:00	France	28–31	Croatia	Arena Zagreb, Zagreb; Attendance: 15,600; Referees: Schulze, Tönnies (GER)
30 January 2025; 21:00	Mem 8	(11–18)	Jelinić, Srna 7	Arena Zagreb, Zagreb; Attendance: 15,600; Referees: Schulze, Tönnies (GER)
30 January 2025; 21:00	1× (yellow card) 4× (suspension) 1× (red card)	Report	2× (yellow card) 4× (suspension)	Arena Zagreb, Zagreb; Attendance: 15,600; Referees: Schulze, Tönnies (GER)

31 January 2025; 20:30	Denmark	40–27	Portugal	Unity Arena, Bærum; Attendance: 8,448; Referees: Lah, Sok (SLO)
31 January 2025; 20:30	Gidsel 9	(20–16)	Areia 5	Unity Arena, Bærum; Attendance: 8,448; Referees: Lah, Sok (SLO)
31 January 2025; 20:30	4× (suspension)	Report	4× (suspension)	Unity Arena, Bærum; Attendance: 8,448; Referees: Lah, Sok (SLO)

=== Third place game ===
2 February 2025; 15:00	France	35–34	Portugal	Unity Arena, Bærum; Attendance: 10,928; Referees: Nachevski, Nikolov (MKD)
2 February 2025; 15:00	Minne 10	(19–17)	F. Costa 8	Unity Arena, Bærum; Attendance: 10,928; Referees: Nachevski, Nikolov (MKD)
2 February 2025; 15:00	1× (yellow card) 2× (suspension)	Report	2× (yellow card) 2× (suspension)	Unity Arena, Bærum; Attendance: 10,928; Referees: Nachevski, Nikolov (MKD)

=== Final ===
2 February 2025; 18:00	Croatia	26–32	Denmark	Unity Arena, Bærum; Attendance: 13,384; Referees: García, Marín (ESP)
2 February 2025; 18:00	Martinović 6	(12–16)	Gidsel 10	Unity Arena, Bærum; Attendance: 13,384; Referees: García, Marín (ESP)
2 February 2025; 18:00	2× (yellow card) 7× (suspension) 2× (red card)	Report	1× (yellow card) 4× (suspension)	Unity Arena, Bærum; Attendance: 13,384; Referees: García, Marín (ESP)

== Final ranking and awards ==
Places 1 to 4 and 25 to 32 were decided by play-off or knock-out. The losers of the quarter finals were ranked 5th to 8th according to the places in the main round, points gained and goal difference. Teams finishing third in the main round were ranked 9th to 12th, teams finishing fourth in the main round were ranked 13th to 16th, teams finishing fifth in the main round were ranked 17th to 20th and teams ranked sixth were ranked 21st to 24th. In case of a tie in points gained, the goal difference of the main round was taken into account, then number of goals scored. If teams were still equal, number of points gained in the preliminary round was considered followed by the goal difference and then number of goals scored in the preliminary round.

=== Final ranking ===
Rank	Team
1st place, gold medalist(s)	Denmark
2nd place, silver medalist(s)	Croatia
3rd place, bronze medalist(s)	France
4	Portugal
5	Egypt
6	Germany
7	Brazil
8	Hungary
9	Iceland
10	Norway
11	Switzerland
12	Netherlands
13	Slovenia
14	Sweden
15	North Macedonia
16	Italy
17	Austria
18	Spain
19	Czech Republic
20	Argentina
21	Qatar
22	Tunisia
23	Cape Verde
24	Chile
25	Poland
26	United States
27	Kuwait
28	Japan
29	Bahrain
30	Algeria
31	Guinea
32	Cuba

Qualified for the 2027 World Men's Handball Championship

2025 Men's World Champions

Denmark
4th title

Team roster: Niclas Kirkeløkke, Magnus Landin Jacobsen, Emil Jakobsen, Rasmus Lauge, Emil Nielsen, Magnus Saugstrup, Jannick Green, Mathias Gidsel, Kevin Møller, Henrik Møllgaard, Mads Mensah Larsen, Lukas Jørgensen, Jóhan Hansen, Lasse Andersson, Emil Bergholt, Simon Hald, Thomas Arnoldsen, Simon Pytlick, Emil Madsen
Head coach: Nikolaj Jacobsen

=== All-star Team ===
The All-star Team was announced on 2 February 2025.

Position	Player
Goalkeeper	(Denmark) Emil Nielsen
Left wing	(France) Dylan Nahi
Left back	(Denmark) Simon Pytlick
Centre back	(Portugal) Martim Costa
Right back	(Croatia) Ivan Martinović
Right wing	(Croatia) Mario Šoštarić
Pivot	(Portugal) Victor Iturriza
Best young player	(Portugal) Francisco Costa
MVP	(Denmark) Mathias Gidsel

== Statistics ==
=== Top goalscorers ===
Rank	Name	Goals	Shots	%
1	(Denmark) Mathias Gidsel	74	107	69
2	(Portugal) Francisco Costa	54	79	68
2	(France) Dika Mem	54	78	69
4	(Denmark) Simon Pytlick	50	67	75
5	(North Macedonia) Filip Kuzmanovski	49	71	69
6	(Kuwait) Saif Al-Dawani	47	81	58
7	(Netherlands) Rutger ten Velde	46	58	79
8	(Denmark) Emil Jakobsen	45	61	74
9	(Portugal) Martim Costa	44	82	54
10	(Qatar) Frankis Marzo	42	76	55

Source: IHF

=== Top goalkeepers ===
Rank	Name	%	Saves	Shots
1	(France) Samir Bellahcene	43	10	23
1	(Denmark) Emil Nielsen	43	125	294
3	(Iceland) Viktor Gísli Hallgrímsson	40	67	167
3	(Norway) Torbjørn Bergerud	40	59	149
5	(Germany) David Späth	39	41	106
6	(Germany) Andreas Wolff	38	76	201
7	(Poland) Marcel Jastrzębski	37	42	113
7	(Brazil) Rangel da Rosa	37	71	191
9	(Brazil) Mateus Nascimento	36	35	97
9	(Slovenia) Urban Lesjak	36	20	56
9	(Croatia) Dominik Kuzmanović	36	88	247

Source: IHF

== Broadcasters ==
Country	Channel
Argentina	TyC Sports
Austria	ORF
Bahrain	Bahrain Sport
Brazil	Grupo Globo (selected matches in all platforms), Cazé Tv (streaming)
Bosnia and Herzegovina	Arena Sport
Cape Verde	RTC
Caribbean	DirecTV
Croatia	RTL (matches played in Croatia)
Czech Republic	Česká televize
Denmark	DR, TV 2
Egypt	ONTime sport
Finland	Viaplay
France	TF1 (select matches), BeIN Sports
Georgia	Silknet
Germany	ARD / ZDF (Germany matches), Eurosport, Sportdeutschland.TV
Hungary	MTVA
Iceland	RÚV
Italy	Sky Sport
Kazakhstan	Sport Plus
Kosovo	Arena Sport
Kuwait	KTV Sport
Latin America	DirecTV
Montenegro	Arena Sport
North Macedonia	MRT (select matches), Arena Sport
Netherlands	Viaplay
Norway	Viaplay
Poland	TVP Sport (select matches), Viaplay
Portugal	RTP
Qatar	Alkass Sport
Romania	Digi Sport, Prima Sport
Serbia	RTS, Arena Sport
Slovakia	RTVS
Slovenia	Radiotelevizija Slovenija, Arena Sport
Spain	Teledeporte
Sweden	TV6 / TV10 (select matches), Viaplay
Switzerland	SRG
Tunisia	Télévision Tunisienne
Ukraine	Poverhnost TV
United States	ESPN3

== Preparations ==
Croatian host city, Varaždin signed their hosting contract on 26 June 2024. In November 2024, host city Poreč also signed their contract. In December 2024, Croatian Handball Federation, Varaždin County, Međimurje County and Čakovec signed a joint co-hosting contract.

On 22 October 2024, the official ball was released.

On 22 November 2024, the Norwegian government allotted 10 million NOK for the tournament.

=== Tickets ===
The first phase of ticket sales started on 15 March 2024 in Croatia, while the sales started on 8 April 2024 in Denmark for people who made a federation account. General sales in Denmark commenced on 12 April 2024. Norway started their ticket sales on 12 April 2024.

Another round of sales in Croatia started on 5 June 2024.

== See also ==
- 2025 World Women's Handball Championship
