= Jonas Strömberg =

American handball player (born 2001)

Personal information
- Full name: Jonas Sven Davey Strömberg
- Nationality: American-Swedish
- Born: 27 August 2001 (age 25) Nacka, Sweden
- Height: 1.91 m (6 ft 3 in)

Sport
- Sport: Handball
- Position: Right back
- Current club: H43 Lund
- Number: 8

Youth career
- Years: Team
- 2010–2018: Skuru IK

Senior clubs
- Years: Team
- 2018–2020: Skuru IK
- 2020–2022: Bodens BK
- 2022–2025: Lugi HF
- 2023–2024: → IFK Ystad (loan)
- 2025–: H43 Lund
National team
Years	Team	Apps	(Gls)
2019–	United States	20	(45)
Medal record
Nor.Ca. Championship
Gold medal – first place	2026 United States

Jonas "Joey" Strömberg (born 27 August 2001) is an American-Swedish handball player for H43 Lund and the United States national team.

He represented United States at the 2023 World Men's Handball Championship and the 2025 World Men's Handball Championship.

== Career ==
Strömberg lived in Asia as a child and started playing handball at the age of 9 after moving back to Sweden with his American mother and Swedish father. His cousin is international handballer Carin Strömberg.
