= Cape Verde men's national handball team =

Cape Verde

Information
- Nickname: Blue sharks
- Association: Federação Cabo-verdiana de Andebol
- Coach: Ljubomir Obradović
- Assistant coach: Tiago da Rocha

Colours
1st	2nd

Results

World Championship
- Appearances: 3 (First in 2021)
- Best result: 23rd (2023, 2025)

African Championship
- Appearances: 4 (First in 2020)
- Best result: (silver) 2nd (2022)
- Last updated on Unknown.

The Cape Verde national handball team is the national handball team of Cape Verde.

Cape Verde qualified for the 2021 World Championship after placing fifth in their first participation in the African Championship. But they had to withdraw from the tournament, after not having the minimum of players available, due to several cases of players who tested positive for COVID-19. The team qualified to the 2023 World Championship after beating Angola in the quarterfinals of the African tournament.

== Results ==
=== World Championship ===
Year	Round	Position	Pld	W	D	L	GF	GA	GD
(Egypt) 2021	Presidents Cup	32	7	0	0	7	27	94	−97
(Poland) (Sweden) 2023	Main Round	23	6	1	0	5	171	206	−35
(Croatia) (Denmark) (Norway) 2025	Main Round	23	6	1	0	5	157	203	−46
(Germany) 2027	Qualified								
Total	4/29	0 Titles	19	2	0	17	355	506	−151

=== African Championship ===
Year	Round	Position	Pld	W	D	L	GF	GA	GD
(Tunisia) 2020	group stage	5	5	2	0	3	138	147	-9
(Egypt) 2022	Final	2	5	3	0	2	133	137	−4
(Egypt) 2024	Semifinals	4	6	4	0	2	209	151	+58
(Rwanda) 2026	Semifinals	3	7	5	0	2	179	172	+7
Total	4/27	0 Titles	23	14	0	9	659	607	+52

== Current squad ==
Squad for the 2025 World Men's Handball Championship.

Head coach: Jorge Rito

No.	Pos.	Name	Date of birth (age)	Height	App.	Goals	Club
1	GK	Élcio Fernandes	23 September 1996 (age 29)	1.96 m	16	0	(Spain) CB Burgos
2	RB	Edmilson García	27 July 1998 (age 28)	1.85 m	0	0	(Portugal) Associação Artistica de Avanca
3	LB	Délcio Pina	27 March 1992 (age 34)	1.98 m	40	31	(Portugal) Madeira Andebol SAD
4	P	Ivo Santos	28 April 1992 (age 34)	2.00 m	28	1	(Germany) Bergischer HC
5	LB	Edmilson Araújo	6 January 1994 (age 32)	1.87 m	6	12	(France) Istres Provence Handball
6	CB	Leandro Semedo	24 December 1994 (age 31)	1.94 m	47	19	Kuwait SC
8	RB	Hafsteinn Ramos	29 February 2000 (age 26)	1.90 m	0	0	(Iceland) Íþróttafélagið Grótta
10	RB	Bruno Landim	6 April 1993 (age 33)	1.93 m	24	24	(Saudi Arabia) Al-Taraji Club
11	RW	Admilson Furtado	30 September 1995 (age 30)	1.77 m	22	18	(Iceland) Knattspyrnufélagið Hörður
12	GK	Edmilson Gonçalves	26 December 1993 (age 32)	1.89 m	13	1	(Portugal) Boa-Hora
13	P	Paulo Moreno	8 May 1992 (age 34)	1.97 m	10	28	(France) C' Chartres Métropole Handball
14	LW	Alexandre Pereira	1 July 1994 (age 32)	1.86 m	20	2	(Portugal) C.F. Os Belenenses
15	LW	Gilson Correia	23 April 1995 (age 31)	1.75 m	13	1	(Luxembourg) CHEV Diekirch
16	GK	Bruno Fernandes	20 September 2001 (age 24)	1.92 m	3	0	(Portugal) IFC Torrense
17	RB	Rafael Andrade	1 March 1996 (age 30)	1.96 m	34	0	(Portugal) Vitória
44	CB	Gualther Furtado	6 February 1995 (age 31)	1.85 m	31	21	(Spain) Club Cisne de Balonmano
48	RW	Malvino Varela	20 January 2003 (age 23)	1.77 m	0	0	(Cape Verde) Girassol
55	CB	Isaías Sousa	6 December 2003 (age 22)	1.75 m	0	0	(Cape Verde) Associação Asa Stars
