= Handball at the 2004 Summer Olympics – Women's team rosters =

These squads consisted of a maximum of 15 players.

== Teams ==
=== Angola ===
The following is the Angola roster in the women's handball tournament of the 2004 Summer Olympics.

Head coaches: Pavel Dzhenev

No.	Pos.	Name	Date of birth (age)	Height	App.	Goals	Club
1	GK	Odete Tavares	18 August 1976 (aged 27)	1.72 m	56	0	(Angola) 1º de Agosto
3	LB	Ilda Bengue	30 October 1974 (aged 29)	1.78 m	98	402	(France) Cercle Dijon Bourgogne
4	CB	Belina Larica	11 February 1980 (aged 24)	1.76 m	5	11	(Angola) Petro Atlético
5	RW	Filomena Trinidade	26 September 1971 (aged 32)	1.64 m	125	455	(Angola) Petro Atlético
6	P	Rosa Amaral	21 June 1980 (aged 24)	1.75 m	33	39	(Angola) Petro Atlético
7	LW	Ines Jololo	30 November 1975 (aged 28)	1.80 m	54	110	(Angola) 1º de Agosto
8	LB	Nair Almeida	23 January 1984 (aged 20)	1.80 m	28	70	(Angola) Enana
9	P	Lili Torres	24 May 1969 (aged 35)	1.81 m	133	247	(Angola) Petro Atlético
10	LW	Isabel Fernandes	5 June 1985 (aged 19)	1.81 m	13	23	(Angola) Petro Atlético
11	CB	Luisa Kiala	25 January 1982 (aged 22)	1.79 m	22	47	(Angola) Petro Atlético
12	GK	Neyde Barbosa	23 September 1980 (aged 23)	1.75 m	6	0	(Angola) Enana
14	RW	Dionisia Pio	10 February 1977 (aged 27)	1.67 m	5	4	(Spain) El Ferrobus Mislata
15	P	Anica Neto	27 December 1972 (aged 31)	1.81 m	70	50	(Angola) 1º de Agosto
16	GK	Maria Pedro	29 December 1982 (aged 21)	1.73 m	12	0	(Angola) Petro Atlético
18	LB	Elzira Tavares	13 May 1980 (aged 24)	1.84 m	16	32	(Angola) Enana

=== Brazil ===
The following is the Brazil roster in the women's handball tournament of the 2004 Summer Olympics.

Head coach: Alexandre Schneider

No.	Pos.	Name	Date of birth (age)	Height	App.	Goals	Club
1	GK	Chana Masson	18 December 1978 (aged 25)	1.84 m			(Denmark) FC Copenhagen
2	P	Fabiana Diniz	13 May 1981 (aged 23)	1.83 m			(Portugal) CDES Gil Eanes
3	RW	Alexandra do Nascimento	16 September 1981 (aged 22)	1.77 m			(Austria) Hypo NÖ
4	CB	Margareth Montão	19 July 1971 (aged 33)	1.78 m			(Brazil) MAUA Universo
5	P	Daniela Piedade	2 February 1979 (aged 25)	1.73 m			(Austria) Hypo NÖ
6	CB	Fabiana Kuestener	15 April 1981 (aged 23)	1.75 m			(Brazil) AD Blumenau
8	LB	Ana Amorim	1 April 1983 (aged 21)	1.81 m			(North Macedonia) Kometal Gjorče
9	CB	Milene Figueiredo	3 February 1983 (aged 21)	1.84 m			(Brazil) Aguias Nova Gerty
10	LW	Aline Rosas	28 June 1979 (aged 25)	1.59 m			(Brazil) Guaru
11	RW	Viviane Jacques	20 May 1977 (aged 27)	1.71 m			(Brazil) MESC São Paulo
13	CB	Lucila Silva	7 March 1976 (aged 28)	1.73 m			(Brazil) Guaru
15	LB	Aline Silva	25 May 1979 (aged 25)	1.76 m			(Portugal) CDES Gil Eanes
16	GK	Darly de Paula	25 August 1982 (aged 21)	1.82 m			(Spain) Akaba Bera Bera
17	LW	Idalina Mesquita	25 August 1982 (aged 21)	1.83 m			(Brazil) MAUA Universo
19	LB	Aline Santos	17 August 1981 (aged 22)	1.95 m			(Spain) El Ferrobus Mislata

=== China ===
The following is the China roster in the women's handball tournament of the 2004 Summer Olympics.

Head coaches: Chung Hyungkyun

No.	Pos.	Name	Date of birth (age)	Height	App.	Goals	Club
1	GK	Fan Jie	25 October 1976 (aged 27)	1.76 m			(China) Beijing Handball Club
2	CB	Zhai Chao	14 December 1971 (aged 32)	1.78 m			(Denmark) Viborg HK
3	P	Liu Yun	6 March 1982 (aged 22)	1.80 m			(China) Anhui Handball Club
5	CB	Li Bing	21 January 1980 (aged 24)	1.81 m			(China) Beijing Army
6	LB	Zhang Zhiqing	14 October 1981 (aged 22)	1.80 m			(China) Guangdong Handball Club
8	LW	Zhang Li	4 October 1976 (aged 27)	1.72 m			(China) Beijing Handball Club
9	RB	Wang Min	14 June 1980 (aged 24)	1.74 m			(China) Shanghai Handball Club
10	LB	Wang Shasha	1 August 1987 (aged 17)	1.76 m			(China) Shangdong Handball Club
11	P	Chen Ji	5 December 1976 (aged 27)	1.75 m			(China) Shanghai Handball Club
13	LW	Wu Yanan	14 September 1981 (aged 22)	1.73 m			(China) Beijing Army
14	RB	Liu Xiaomei	2 May 1985 (aged 19)	1.78 m			(China) Anhui Handball Club
15	RW	Sun Laimiao	8 April 1981 (aged 23)	1.76 m			(China) Anhui Handball Club
16	GK	Yu Geli	28 April 1976 (aged 28)	1.81 m			(China) Beijing Army
17	RW	Lei Sufen	5 June 1979 (aged 25)	1.71 m			(China) Guangdong Handball Club
19	LB	Li Weiwei	7 July 1982 (aged 22)	1.78 m			(China) Beijing Army

=== Denmark ===
The following is the Denmark roster in the women's handball tournament of the 2004 Summer Olympics.

Head coaches: Jan Pytlick

No.	Pos.	Name	Date of birth (age)	Height	App.	Goals	Club
1	GK	Louise Nørgaard	23 April 1982 (aged 22)	1.83 m			(Denmark) Viborg HK
2	LB	Rikke Skov	7 September 1980 (aged 23)	1.81 m			(Denmark) Viborg HK
3	LW	Henriette Mikkelsen	21 September 1980 (aged 23)	1.66 m			(Denmark) Viborg HK
5	RB	Mette Vestergaard	19 November 1975 (aged 28)	1.72 m			(Denmark) FC Copenhagen
10	CB	Rikke Jørgensen	2 May 1976 (aged 28)	1.71 m			(Denmark) Slagelse FH
11	P	Camilla Ingemann Thomsen	19 November 1974 (aged 29)	1.80 m			(Denmark) FC Copenhagen
12	GK	Karin Mortensen	26 September 1977 (aged 26)	1.82 m			(Denmark) Ikast/Bording EH
13	CB	Lotte Kiærskou	23 June 1975 (aged 29)	1.78 m			(Denmark) Viborg HK
14	RB	Trine Jensen	16 October 1980 (aged 23)	1.76 m			(Denmark) Aalborg DH
15	LB	Katrine Fruelund	12 July 1978 (aged 26)	1.74 m			(Denmark) Viborg HK
16	GK	Rikke Schmidt	14 January 1975 (aged 29)	1.84 m			(Denmark) Slagelse FH
17	CB	Kristine Andersen	2 April 1976 (aged 28)	1.72 m			(Denmark) Ikast/Bording EH
18	P	Karen Brødsgaard	10 March 1978 (aged 26)	1.78 m			(Denmark) Ikast/Bording EH
19	LW	Line Daugaard	17 July 1978 (aged 26)	1.72 m			(Denmark) Ikast/Bording EH
21	RW	Josephine Touray	6 October 1979 (aged 24)	1.65 m			(Denmark) Ikast/Bording EH

=== France ===
The following is the France roster in the women's handball tournament of the 2004 Summer Olympics.

Head coaches: Olivier Krumbholz

No.	Pos.	Name	Date of birth (age)	Height	App.	Goals	Club
1	GK	Joanne Dudziak	8 June 1972 (aged 32)	1.70 m	148	1	(France) HBC Nimes
2	LB	Isabelle Cendier Ajaguin	22 May 1977 (aged 27)	1.72 m	84	132	(France) HB Metz Métropole
3	RW	Estelle Vogein	3 April 1976 (aged 28)	1.70 m	85	132	(France) HB Metz Métropole
4	LB	Leila Lejeune	16 March 1976 (aged 28)	1.76 m	156	636	(Denmark) Viborg HK
5	CB	Sandrine Delerce	26 April 1975 (aged 29)	1.73 m	155	373	(France) ESBF Besançon
6	RB	Melinda Jacques	13 October 1971 (aged 32)	1.89 m	58	263	(France) HB Metz Métropole
7	LB	Nodjialem Myaro	5 September 1976 (aged 27)	1.82 m	141	490	(Denmark) KIF Kolding
8	P	Véronique Pecqueux-Rolland	9 October 1972 (aged 31)	1.72 m	220	651	(France) ESBF Besançon
10	CB	Sophie Herbrecht	13 February 1982 (aged 22)	1.74 m	52	98	(France) ESBF Besançon
11	RW	Stéphanie Cano	17 April 1974 (aged 30)	1.64 m	176	306	(Denmark) Slagelse FH
13	P	Isabelle Wendling	30 January 1971 (aged 33)	1.75 m	232	386	(France) HB Metz Métropole
14	LB	Myriam Korfanty	18 October 1978 (aged 25)	1.80 m	119	184	(France) US Mios
16	GK	Valérie Nicolas	12 March 1975 (aged 29)	1.78 m	174	0	(Denmark) Viborg HK
17	LW	Delphine Guehl	30 July 1978 (aged 26)	1.72 m	21	44	(France) Cercle Dijon Bourgogne
20	LW	Raphaëlle Tervel	21 April 1979 (aged 25)	1.78 m	89	161	(France) ESBF Besançon

=== Greece ===
The following is the Greece roster in the women's handball tournament of the 2004 Summer Olympics.

Head coaches: Svein Andre Olsen

No.	Pos.	Name	Date of birth (age)	Height	App.	Goals	Club
2	P	Anna Psatha	8 February 1975 (aged 29)	1.72 m			(Germany) VfL Oldenburg
3	P	Eleni Poimenidou	4 July 1980 (aged 24)	1.72 m			(Greece) Ormi Patras
5	LW	Eleni Potari	25 August 1982 (aged 21)	1.71 m			(Greece) Aris Nikeas
7	LB	Georgia Dorotheou	20 October 1980 (aged 23)	1.65 m			(Greece) Aris Nikeas
8	RW	Panagoula Vemi	26 May 1971 (aged 33)	1.67 m			(Greece) Anagennisi Arta
9	LB	Ioanna Fotiadou	22 November 1977 (aged 26)	1.78 m			(Greece) Anagennisi Arta
10	CB	Vasiliki Skara	4 May 1973 (aged 31)	1.80 m			(Greece) Anagennisi Arta
11	LB	Grigoria Gkolia	22 March 1974 (aged 30)	1.84 m			(Germany) VfL Oldenburg
12	GK	Elena Nikoli	12 May 1982 (aged 22)	1.77 m			(Greece) Ormi Patras
15	LB	Tatiana Sousa	16 February 1975 (aged 29)	1.81 m			(Greece) OFN Ionias
16	GK	Eleftheria Mavrogeni	12 May 1970 (aged 34)	1.77 m			(Greece) Makedonikos
17	RW	Anastasia Patsiou	13 June 1977 (aged 27)	1.72 m			(Germany) TUS Weibern
18	RB	Michaela Michalopoulou	20 April 1980 (aged 24)	1.87 m			(Greece) Aris Nikeas
19	CB	Styliani Gioupi	6 February 1978 (aged 26)	1.77 m			(Greece) OFN Ionias
20	LW	Vicky Theodoridou	27 January 1982 (aged 22)	1.65 m			(Switzerland) LC Bruni

=== Hungary ===
The following is the Hungary roster in the women's handball tournament of the 2004 Summer Olympics.

Head coaches: Lajos Mocsai

No.	Pos.	Name	Date of birth (age)	Height	App.	Goals	Club
1	GK	Irina Sirina	7 November 1967 (aged 36)	1.82 m			(Hungary) Győri ETO KC
2	LB	Bernadett Ferling	13 July 1977 (aged 27)	1.80 m			(Hungary) Dunaferr SE
3	P	Beáta Bohus	25 April 1971 (aged 33)	1.72 m			(Hungary) Dunaferr SE
4	RB	Ibolya Mehlmann	4 November 1981 (aged 22)	1.85 m			(Hungary) Győri ETO KC
5	RW	Zsuzsanna Pálffy	26 December 1970 (aged 33)	1.80 m			(Hungary) Dunaferr SE
6	LW	Erika Kirsner	23 December 1975 (aged 28)	1.73 m			(Hungary) Ferencvárosi TC
9	RB	Bojana Radulovics	23 March 1973 (aged 31)	1.79 m			(Hungary) Dunaferr SE
10	CB	Krisztina Pigniczki	18 September 1975 (aged 28)	1.71 m			(Hungary) Dunaferr SE
11	LB	Ágnes Farkas	21 April 1973 (aged 31)	1.84 m			(Denmark) Aalborg DH
13	CB	Anita Görbicz	13 May 1983 (aged 21)	1.75 m			(Hungary) Győri ETO KC
15	CB	Eszter Ágnes Siti	12 November 1977 (aged 26)	1.71 m			(Denmark) FCK Håndbold
16	GK	Katalin Pálinger	6 December 1978 (aged 25)	1.83 m			(Hungary) Dunaferr SE
17	LB	Tímea Tóth	16 September 1980 (aged 23)	1.81 m			(Hungary) Ferencvárosi TC
18	RW	Zsuzsanna Lovász	2 October 1976 (aged 27)	1.73 m			(Hungary) Dunaferr SE
19	P	Anita Kulcsár	2 October 1976 (aged 27)	1.78 m			(Hungary) Dunaferr SE

=== South Korea ===
The following is the South Korea roster in the women's handball tournament of the 2004 Summer Olympics.

Head coaches: Lim Young-chul

No.	Pos.	Name	Date of birth (age)	Height	App.	Goals	Club
1	GK	Oh Yong-ran	6 September 1972 (aged 31)	1.71 m
2	RW	Woo Sun-hee	1 July 1978 (aged 26)	1.72 m			(South Korea) Samcheok Handball
4	P	Huh Soon-young	28 September 1975 (aged 28)	1.80 m			(South Korea) Daegu Handball
5	LW	Lee Gong-joo	25 March 1980 (aged 24)	1.63 m			(South Korea) Busan Sports Council
7	LW	Jang So-hee	15 March 1978 (aged 26)	1.63 m			(South Korea) Daegu Handball
8	RW	Kim Hyun-ok	14 May 1974 (aged 30)	1.68 m
9	P	Kim Cha-youn	10 January 1981 (aged 23)	1.73 m			(South Korea) Daegu Handball
10	LB	Oh Seong-ok	10 October 1972 (aged 31)	1.70 m			(Japan) Hiroshima Maple Reds
11	CB	Huh Young-sook	2 July 1975 (aged 29)	1.70 m			(South Korea) Busan Sports Council
12	GK	Moon Kyeong-ha	29 May 1980 (aged 24)	1.74 m			(South Korea) Changwon City Racing Council
13	CB	Lim O-kyeong	11 December 1971 (aged 32)	1.67 m			(Japan) Hiroshima Maple Reds
15	LB	Lee Sang-eun	5 March 1975 (aged 29)	1.72 m
17	RB	Myoung Bok-hee	29 January 1979 (aged 25)	1.68 m
19	RB	Choi Im-jeong	14 February 1981 (aged 23)	1.80 m			(South Korea) Daegu Handball
20	LB	Moon Pil-hee	2 December 1982 (aged 21)	1.68 m			(South Korea) Korea National University

=== Spain ===
The following is the Spain roster in the women's handball tournament of the 2004 Summer Olympics.

Head coaches: Jose Aldeguer

No.	Pos.	Name	Date of birth (age)	Height	App.	Goals	Club
1	GK	Elisabeth López	27 January 1975 (aged 29)	1.79 m			(Spain) Mar Valencia
2	RB	Soraya Garcia	21 March 1978 (aged 26)	1.73 m			(Spain) CP Goya Almería
3	RW	Susana Pareja	13 March 1975 (aged 29)	1.66 m			(Spain) Ferrobus Mislata
5	LW	Vanessa Amorós	7 December 1982 (aged 21)	1.65 m			(Spain) BM Elche
6	RW	Cristina Lopez	8 July 1975 (aged 29)	1.68 m			(Spain) Akaba Bera Bera
7	LB	Maite Andreu	26 January 1971 (aged 33)	1.85 m			(Spain) Ferrobus Mislata
8	P	Cristina Gómez	22 March 1968 (aged 36)	1.68 m			(Spain) Mar Valencia
9	CB	Marta Mangué	23 April 1983 (aged 21)	1.70 m			(Spain) Mar Valencia
10	P	Diana Box	6 March 1971 (aged 33)	1.72 m			(Spain) BM Femenino Elda
11	CB	Montserrat Puche	22 May 1970 (aged 34)	1.71 m			(Spain) Mar Valencia
13	LB	Susana Fraile	4 July 1978 (aged 26)	1.83 m			(Spain) BM Femenino Elda
14	CB	Patricia Alonso	27 April 1979 (aged 25)	1.70 m			(Spain) Ferrobus Mislata
15	RB	Isabel Ortuno	16 March 1982 (aged 22)	1.77 m			(Spain) BM Femenino Elda
16	GK	Eugenia Sanchez	25 July 1969 (aged 34)	1.71 m			(Spain) BM Femenino Elda
20	LW	Noelia Oncina	9 November 1976 (aged 27)	1.66 m			(Spain) Mar Valencia

=== Ukraine ===
The following is the Ukraine roster in the women's handball tournament of the 2004 Summer Olympics.

Head coaches: Leonid Ratner

No.	Pos.	Name	Date of birth (age)	Height	App.	Goals	Club
1	GK	Nataliya Borysenko	3 December 1975 (aged 28)	1.88 m			(North Macedonia) Kometal Skopje
3	LB	Ganna Burmystrova	16 June 1977 (aged 27)	1.82 m			(Ukraine) Motor Zaporizhzhia
4	CB	Tetyana Shynkarenko	26 October 1978 (aged 25)	1.75 m			(Austria) Hypo NÖ
5	RB	Maryna Vergelyuk	24 June 1978 (aged 26)	1.78 m			(Slovenia) RK Krim
6	RW	Olena Yatsenko	4 October 1977 (aged 26)	1.68 m			(Slovenia) RK Krim
7	CB	Ganna Siukalo	12 September 1976 (aged 27)	1.75 m			(Hungary) Váci NKSE
8	LW	Olena Radchenko	21 May 1973 (aged 31)	1.75 m			(North Macedonia) Kometal Skopje
9	LB	Olena Tsyhytsia	8 April 1975 (aged 29)	1.80 m			(North Macedonia) Kometal Skopje
10	P	Galyna Markushevska	16 July 1976 (aged 28)	1.92 m			(Ukraine) Motor Zaporizhzhia
11	P	Lyudmyla Shevchenko	4 February 1970 (aged 34)	1.83 m			(Ukraine) Motor Zaporizhzhia
12	GK	Iryna Honcharova	19 December 1974 (aged 29)	1.80 m			(Ukraine) Motor Zaporizhzhia
14	LW	Nataliya Lyapina	14 May 1976 (aged 28)	1.68 m			(Ukraine) Spartak Kyiv
15	LB	Anastasiia Pidpalova	5 January 1982 (aged 22)	1.92 m			(Ukraine) Motor Zaporizhzhia
16	GK	Larysa Zaspa	22 September 1971 (aged 32)	1.82 m			(Ukraine) Motor Zaporizhzhia
17	LW	Oxana Rayhel	24 February 1977 (aged 27)	1.62 m			(North Macedonia) Kometal Skopje
