= List of Ukrainian sportspeople =

This is a list of notable Ukrainian sportspeople.

== American football ==
- Igor Olshansky – American football

== Archery ==
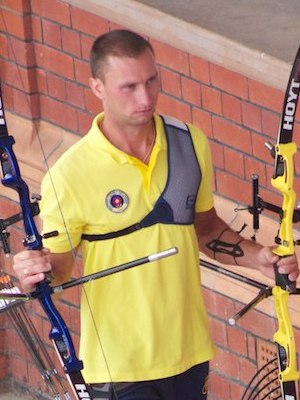
Viktor Ruban

- Nataliya Burdeyna – Olympic silver medalist
- Dmytro Hrachov – Olympic bronze medalist
- Viktor Ruban – Olympic champion
- Olena Sadovnycha – Olympic silver medalist
- Kateryna Serdyuk – Olympic silver medalist
- Oleksandr Serdyuk – Olympic bronze medalist
- Victor Sidoruk
- Stanislav Zabrodsky

== Athletics ==
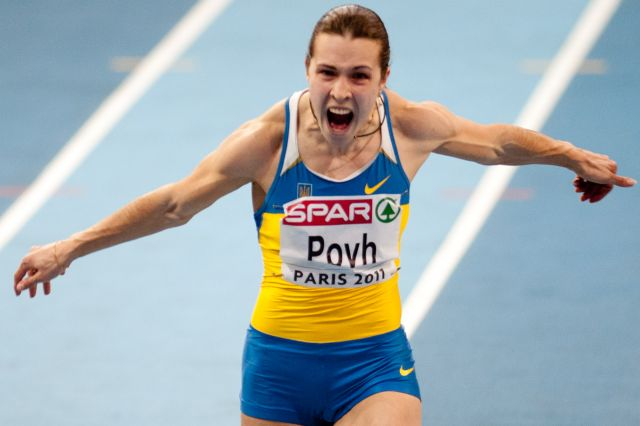
Olesya Povh

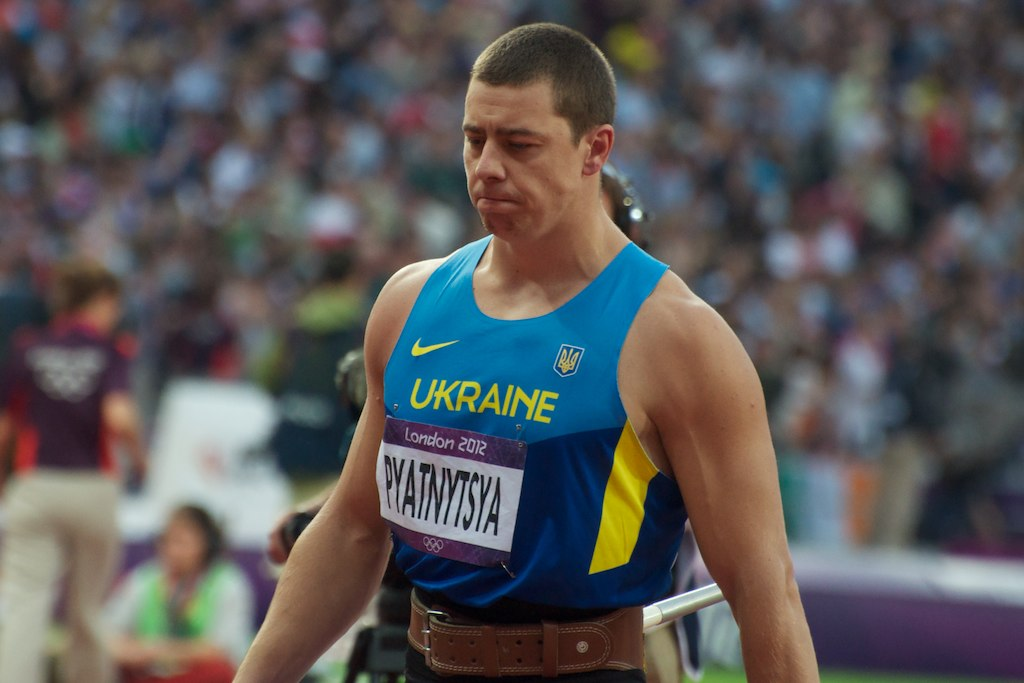
Oleksandr Pyatnytsya

- Olena Antonova
- Inha Babakova
- Oleksandr Bagach
- Bohdan Bondarenko
- Yelyzaveta Bryzhina
- Sergey Bubka – Olympic champion
- Nataliya Dobrynska – Olympic champion
- Olena Hovorova
- Olena Krasovska – Olympic silver medalist
- Inessa Kravets – Olympic champion
- Oleksandr Krykun
- Iryna Lishchynska
- Faina Melnik – 11 world records; Olympic discus throw champion
- Nadiya Olizarenko
- Zhanna Pintusevich-Block, sprinter, world 100-m & 200-m champion
- Olesya Povh
- Oleksandr Pyatnytsya
- Mariya Ryemyen
- Olha Saladuha
- Roman Shchurenko
- Hrystyna Stuy
- Vita Styopina
- Kateryna Tabashnyk (born 1994), high jumper
- Tetyana Tereshchuk-Antipova
- Nataliya Tobias
- Denys Yurchenko

== Baseball ==
- Bill Cristall
- Reuben Ewing
- Izzy Goldstein

== Basketball ==
- Alexander Belostenny
- Sergiy Gladyr
- Natalya Klimova
- Viacheslav Kravtsov
- Raisa Kurvyakova
- Alex Len
- Slava Medvedenko
- Oleksiy Pecherov
- Anatoli Polivoda
- Vitaly Potapenko
- Lyudmila Rogozhina
- Anton Shoutvin
- Marina Tkachenko
- Vladimir Tkachenko
- Alexander Volkov
- Tetiana Zakharova-Nadyrova

== Biathlon ==
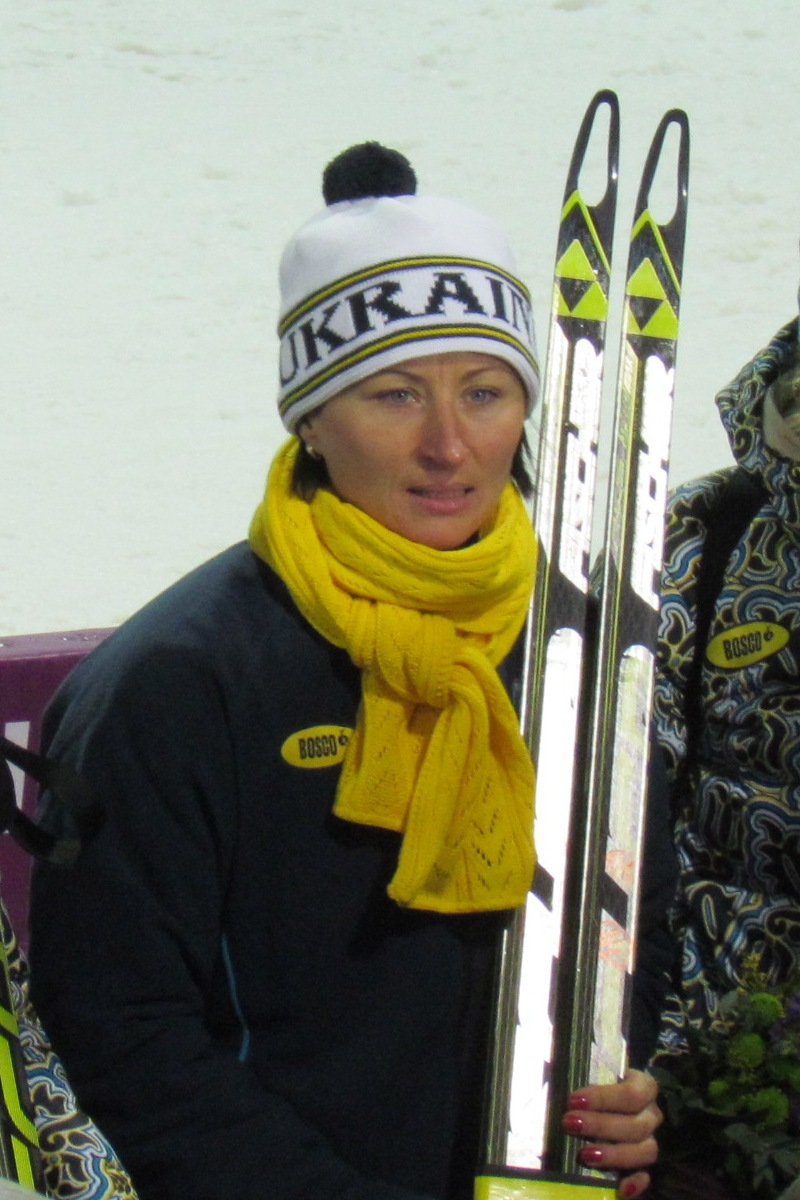
Vita Semerenko

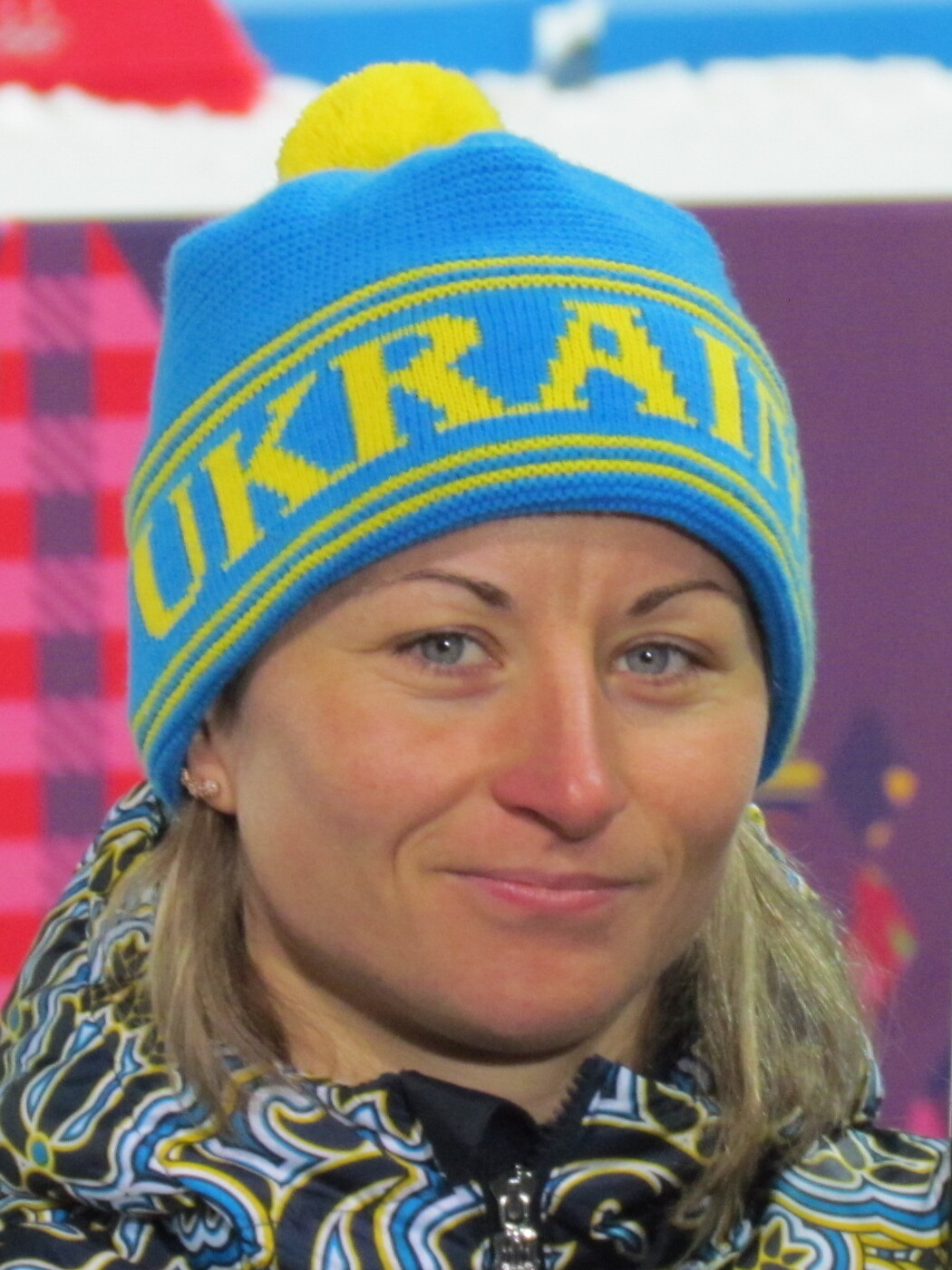
Valj Semerenko

- Olexander Bilanenko
- Andriy Deryzemlya
- Juliya Dzhyma – Olympic champion
- Lilia Efremova – Olympic bronze medalist
- Pavlo Ishchenko – 2x European Amateur Boxing Championships medalist, and European Games medalist
- Oksana Khvostenko
- Nina Lemesh
- Olena Petrova – Olympic silver medalist
- Olena Pidhrushna – Olympic champion
- Serhiy Sednev
- Serhiy Semenov
- Valj Semerenko – Olympic champion
- Vita Semerenko – Olympic champion
- Valentina Tserbe-Nessina – Olympic bronze medalist
- Tetyana Vodopyanova
- Olena Zubrilova

== Boxing ==
- Denys Berinchyk
- Serhiy Danylchenko
- Serhiy Dotsenko – Olympic silver medalist
- Andriy Fedchuk
- Vyacheslav Glazkov
- Oleksandr Hvozdyk
- Oleg Kiryukhin
- Vitali Klitschko – Professional boxer
- Wladimir Klitschko – Olympic champion, professional boxer
- Andreas Kotelnik – Olympic silver medalist
- Ihor Korobchynskyi
- Vasyl Lomachenko – Olympic champion
- Grigory Misutin
- Taras Shelestyuk
- Volodymyr Sydorenko
- Oleksandr Usyk – Olympic champion

== Canoeing ==
- Hanna Balabanova
- Yuriy Cheban – Olympic champion
- Olena Cherevatova
- Inna Osypenko-Radomska – Olympic champion
- Tetyana Semykina

== Cycling ==
- Yana Belomoyna
- Serhiy Cherniavskiy
- Oleksandr Fedenko
- Lesya Kalytovska
- Sergiy Matveyev
- Hanna Solovey
- Alexander Symonenko
- Iryna Yanovych

== Cross-country skiing ==
- Alexander Batyuk
- Valentina Shevchenko
- Iryna Taranenko-Terelia

== Diving ==
- Illya Kvasha
- Oleksiy Pryhorov
- Ganna Sorokina
- Olena Zhupina

== Equestrian ==
- Vera Misevich

== Fencing ==
- Vadim Gutzeit – Olympic champion
- Olha Kharlan – Olympic champion
- Olena Khomrova – Olympic champion
- Halyna Pundyk – Olympic champion
- Yana Shemyakina – Olympic champion
- Vladyslav Tretiak
- Olha Zhovnir – Olympic champion

== Figure skating ==
- Oksana Baiul – Olympic champion
- Alexei Beletski – Olympican
- Oleksii Bychenko – 2016 European silver medallist, Olympian
- Elena Grushina – Olympic bronze medalist
- Ruslan Goncharov – Olympic bronze medalist
- Natalia Gudina – Olympian
- Kyrylo Marsak — Olympian
- Viktor Petrenko – Olympic champion

== Football ==
- Yevhen Konoplyanka
- Andriy Oberemko
- Serhii Rebrov
- Andriy Shevchenko
- Anatoliy Tymoshchuk
- Andriy Voronin

== Freestyle skiing ==
- Olha Volkova

== Gymnastics ==
- Alexander Beresch
- Anna Bessonova
- Nina Bocharova
- Viktor Chukarin
- Olena Dvornichenko
- Valeri Goncharov
- Dmytro Leonkin
- Tatiana Lysenko – 2x Olympic champion
- Valeria Maksyuta
- Yuri Nikitin
- Katerina Pisetsky
- Lilia Podkopayeva
- Ihor Radivilov
- Kateryna Serebrianska
- Rustam Sharipov
- Olena Vitrychenko
- Oleksandr Vorobiov
- Roman Zozulya

== Handball ==
- Anastasiia Pidpalova
- Nataliya Borysenko
- Ganna Burmystrova
- Iryna Honcharova
- Nataliya Lyapina
- Galyna Markushevska
- Olena Radchenko
- Oxana Rayhel
- Lyudmyla Shevchenko
- Tetyana Shynkarenko
- Ganna Siukalo
- Olena Tsyhytsia
- Maryna Vergelyuk
- Olena Yatsenko
- Larysa Zaspa

== Ice hockey ==
- Anatolii Brezvin (born 1956), president of the Ice Hockey Federation of Ukraine from 2006 to 2020
- Ivan Pravilov (1963–2012), ice hockey coach, arrested for sexual abuse of teenage student, committed suicide by hanging in prison

== Judo ==
- Roman Hontyuk
- Ruslan Mashurenko

== Luge ==
- Natalia Yakushenko

== Modern pentathlon ==
- Victoria Tereshchuk

== Rowing ==
- Serhiy Biloushchenko
- Yana Dementyeva – Olympic champion
- Nataliya Dovhodko – Olympic champion
- Inna Frolova – Olympic silver medalist
- Serhiy Hryn
- Anastasiya Kozhenkova – Olympic champion
- Oleh Lykov
- Svitlana Maziy – Olympic silver medalist
- Dina Miftakhutdynova – Olympic silver medalist
- Olena Ronzhyna – Olympic silver medalist
- Leonid Shaposhnykov
- Kateryna Tarasenko – Olympic champion

== Rugby league ==
- Ian Rubin

== Sailing ==
- Yevhen Braslavets – Olympic champion
- Ganna Kalinina
- George Leonchuk
- Rodion Luka
- Valentin Mankin – Olympic champion, only sailor in Olympic history to win gold medals in three different classes
- Svitlana Matevusheva
- Ihor Matviyenko – Olympic champion
- Olena Pakholchyk
- Ruslana Taran

== Shooting ==
- Artur Ayvazyan – Olympic champion
- Mykola Milchev – Olympic champion
- Olena Kostevych – Olympic champion
- Oleksandr Petriv – Olympic champion
- Jury Sukhorukov

== Short track speed skating ==
- Vladimir Grigorev

== Speed skating ==
- Oleg Goncharenko

== Swimming ==
- Olga Beresnyeva
- Tatyana Devyatova
- Sergey Fesenko, Sr. – Olympic champion
- Yuriy Hromak
- Pavlo Khnykin
- Olga Kirichenko
- Yana Klochkova – Olympic champion
- Serhiy Krasyuk
- Lenny Krayzelburg – 4x Olympic champion
- Yelena Kruglova
- Oleg Lisogor
- Maxim Podoprigora
- Georgy Prokopenko – Olympic champion
- Galina Prozumenshchikova – Olympic champion
- Volodymyr Raskatov
- Andriy Serdinov
- Oleksandr Sydorenko – Olympic champion
- Denys Sylantyev
- Volodymyr Tkachenko
- Marina Yurchenya

== Table tennis ==
- Marina Kravchenko

== Tennis ==
- Alona Bondarenko
- Kateryna Bondarenko
- Alexandr Dolgopolov
- Olga Fridman
- Julia Glushko
- Andriy Medvedev
- Sergiy Stakhovsky
- Elina Svitolina

== Triathlon ==
- Danyil Odynets

== Volleyball ==
- Volodymyr Byelyayev
- Volodymyr Ivanov
- Valeriy Kryvov
- Yevhen Lapinsky
- Fedir Lashchonov
- Viktor Mikhalchuk
- Oleg Moliboga
- Yury Panchenko
- Anatoliy Polishchuk
- Yuriy Poyarkov
- Eduard Sibiryakov
- Oleksandr Sorokalet
- Borys Tereshchuk
- Yury Vengerovsky

== Water polo ==
- Aleksei Barkalov
- Viktor Berendyuga
- Boris Goykhman
- Andriy Kovalenko
- Mikhail Ryzhak
- Nikolai Smirnov
- Dmitri Stratan
- Vladimir Zhmudsky

== Weightlifting ==
- Nataliya Davydova
- Denys Hotfrid
- Yuliya Kalina
- Moisei Kas’ianik – world champion
- Olha Korobka
- Igor Olshanetskyi – Ukrainian-born Israeli Olympic weightlifter
- Ihor Razoronov
- Igor Rybak – Olympic champion
- Nataliya Skakun – Olympic champion
- Timur Taymazov – Olympic champion
- Oleksiy Torokhtiy – Olympic champion
- Eduard Weitz – Ukrainian-born Israeli Olympic weightlifter

== Wrestling ==
- Valeriy Andriytsev
- Yevhen Buslovych
- Taras Danko
- Vasyl Fedoryshyn
- Grigoriy Gamarnik – world champion
- Samuel Gerson – Olympic silver
- Andriy Kalashnykov
- Iryna Merleni – Olympic champion
- Vyacheslav Oliynyk – Olympic champion
- Yakiv Punkin
- Davyd Saldadze
- Andriy Stadnik
- Elbrus Tedeyev – Olympic champion
- Armen Vardanyan
- Nik Zagranitchni – Israeli Olympic wrestler
- Zaza Zazirov

== See also ==
- Ukraine at the Olympics
- Sport in Ukraine
- List of people born in Ukraine
