= Ukraine at the 2004 Summer Olympics =

- IOC code: UKR
- NOC: National Olympic Committee of Ukraine
- Website: www.noc-ukr.org (in Ukrainian and English)

in Athens
- Competitors: 240 in 21 sports
- Flag bearer: Denys Sylantyev
- Medals Ranked 13th: Gold 8 Silver 5 Bronze 9 Total 22

Summer Olympics appearances (overview)
- 1996; 2000; 2004; 2008; 2012; 2016; 2020; 2024

Other related appearances
- Austria (1896–1912); Hungary (1896–1912); Russian Empire (1900–1912); Czechoslovakia (1920–1936); Poland (1924–1936); Romania (1924–1936); Soviet Union (1952–1988); Unified Team (1992)

Ukraine competed at the 2004 Summer Olympics in Athens, Greece, from 13 to 29 August 2004. This was the nation's third consecutive appearance at the Summer Olympics in the post-Soviet era. The National Olympic Committee of Ukraine sent the nation's largest ever delegation to these Games. A total of 240 athletes, 125 men and 115 women, took part in 21 sports. Women's handball was the only team-based sport in which Ukraine had its representation at these Games for the first time. There was only a single competitor in modern pentathlon and taekwondo.

The Ukrainian team featured several Olympic medalists from Sydney, including skeet shooter Mykola Milchev, heavyweight wrestler David Saldadze (who eventually represented Uzbekistan at the 2008 Summer Olympics in Beijing), triple jumper Olena Hovorova, double defending swimming champion Yana Klochkova, and butterfly swimmer Denys Sylantyev, who later became the nation's flag bearer in the opening ceremony. Double sculls rower Svitlana Maziy and freestyle swimmer Pavlo Khnykin were among the athletes to compete in fourth Olympic Games, although they originally played for either Soviet Union or the Unified Team. Rapid fire pistol shooter Oleh Tkachov, at age 42, was the oldest athlete of the team, while butterfly swimmer Kateryna Zubkova was the youngest at age 16.

Ukraine left Athens with a total of 22 medals, 8 golds, 5 silver, and 9 bronze, being considered the nation's most successful Olympics since its debut in 1996. Most of these medals were awarded to the athletes in track and field, gymnastics, and swimming. Being the major highlight of the games, Yana Klochkova set a historic milestone for Ukraine as the first female swimmer to defend Olympic titles in the individual medley (both 200 and 400 m) at two consecutive Games. Three more female Ukrainian athletes won Olympic gold medals for the first time in their respective events: Olena Kostevych in pistol shooting, Nataliya Skakun in weightlifting, and Irini Merleni in freestyle wrestling. Ukraine 's team-based athletes proved particularly successful in Athens, as the women's handball team took home the bronze medal in the tournament. Originally, Ukraine had won a total of 23 Olympic medals at these Games. On December 5, 2012, the International Olympic Committee and the IAAF stripped off shot putter Yuriy Bilonoh's gold medal after drug re-testings of his samples were discovered positive.

== Medalists ==
Medal	Name	Sport	Event	Date
Gold	Yana Klochkova	Swimming	Women's 400 m individual medley	August 14
Gold	Olena Kostevych	Shooting	Women's 10 m air pistol	August 15
Gold	Yana Klochkova	Swimming	Women's 200 m individual medley	August 17
Gold	Nataliya Skakun	Weightlifting	Women's 63 kg	August 18
Gold	Yuri Nikitin	Gymnastics	Men's trampoline	August 21
Gold	Valeriy Honcharov	Gymnastics	Men's parallel bars	August 23
Gold	Irini Merleni	Wrestling	Women's freestyle 48 kg	August 23
Gold	Elbrus Tedeyev	Wrestling	Men's freestyle 66 kg	August 28
Silver	Roman Hontyuk	Judo	Men's 81 kg	August 17
Silver	Hanna Kalinina; Svitlana Matevusheva; Ruslana Taran	Sailing	Yngling class	August 20
Silver	Olena Krasovska	Athletics	Women's 100 m hurdles	August 24
Silver	Ihor Razoronov	Weightlifting	Men's 105 kg	August 24
Silver	George Leonchuk; Rodion Luka	Sailing	49er class	August 26
Bronze	Vladislav Tretiak	Fencing	Men's sabre	August 14
Bronze	Andriy Serdinov	Swimming	Men's 100 m butterfly	August 20
Bronze	Dmytro Hrachov; Viktor Ruban; Oleksandr Serdyuk	Archery	Men's team	August 21
Bronze	Serhiy Biloushchenko; Serhiy Hryn; Oleh Lykov; Leonid Shaposhnykov	Rowing	Men's quadruple sculls	August 22
Bronze	Tetyana Tereshchuk-Antipova	Athletics	Women's 400 m hurdles	August 25
Bronze	Hanna Balabanova; Olena Cherevatova; Inna Osypenko; Tetyana Semykina	Canoeing	Women's K-4 500 m	August 27
Bronze	Vita Styopina	Athletics	Women's high jump	August 28
Bronze	Anna Bessonova	Gymnastics	Women's rhythmic individual all-around	August 29
Bronze	Ukraine women's national handball team: Anastasiia Pidpalova; Nataliya Borysenko; Ganna Burmystrova; Iryna Honcharova; Nataliya Lyapina; Galyna Markushevska; Olena Radchenko; Oxana Rayhel; Lyudmyla Shevchenko; Tetyana Shynkarenko; Ganna Siukalo; Olena Tsyhytsia; Maryna Vergelyuk; Olena Yatsenko; Larysa Zaspa	Handball	Women's tournament	August 29

Medals by sport
Sport	1st place, gold medalist(s)	2nd place, silver medalist(s)	3rd place, bronze medalist(s)	Total
Gymnastics	2	0	1	3
Swimming	2	0	1	3
Wrestling	2	0	0	2
Weightlifting	1	1	0	2
Shooting	1	0	0	1
Athletics	0	2	1	3
Sailing	0	2	0	2
Judo	0	1	0	1
Archery	0	0	1	1
Canoeing	0	0	1	1
Fencing	0	0	1	1
Handball	0	0	1	1
Rowing	0	0	1	1
Total	8	5	9	22

== Archery ==
Three Ukrainian archers qualified each for the men's and women's individual archery, and a spot each for both men's and women's teams.

Men

Athlete	Event	Ranking round		Round of 64	Round of 32	Round of 16	Quarterfinals	Semifinals	Final / BM	
Athlete	Event	Score	Seed	Opposition Score	Opposition Score	Opposition Score	Opposition Score	Opposition Score	Opposition Score	Rank
Dmytro Hrachov	Individual	671	6	Youssef (EGY); W 154–128	Xue Hf (CHN); L 161–162	Did not advance				
Viktor Ruban	Individual	660	15	Ohayon (CAN); W 157–140	Wang C-P (TPE); W 167 (9)–167 (8)	Godfrey (GBR); L 162–167	Did not advance			
Oleksandr Serdyuk	Individual	654	25	López (ESP); W 164–141	Lind (DEN); W 165–164	Yamamoto (JPN); L 160–168	Did not advance			
Dmytro Hrachov; Viktor Ruban; Oleksandr Serdyuk	Team	1985	4	—N/a		Greece; W 243–225	Japan; W 242–236	South Korea; L 239–242	United States; W 237–235	3rd place, bronze medalist(s)

Women

Athlete	Event	Ranking round		Round of 64	Round of 32	Round of 16	Quarterfinals	Semifinals	Final / BM	
Athlete	Event	Score	Seed	Opposition Score	Opposition Score	Opposition Score	Opposition Score	Opposition Score	Opposition Score	Rank
Tetyana Berezhna	Individual	640	14	Vavatsi (GRE); W 160–156	Nichols (USA); L 160–163	Did not advance				
Nataliya Burdeyna	Individual	643	12	Kawauchi (JPN); L 129–137	Did not advance					
Kateryna Palekha	Individual	595	59	Yuan S-C (TPE); L 158–162	Did not advance					
Tetyana Berezhna; Nataliya Burdeyna; Kateryna Palekha	Team	1878	10	—N/a		Turkey; W 244–234	China; L 230–241	Did not advance		

== Athletics ==
Ukrainian athletes have so far achieved qualifying standards in the following athletics events (up to a maximum of 3 athletes in each event at the 'A' Standard, and 1 at the 'B' Standard). On December 5, 2012, the International Olympic Committee and the IAAF stripped off Ukrainian shot putter Yuriy Bilonoh's gold medal after drug re-testings of his samples were discovered positive.

Key

- Note–Ranks given for track events are within the athlete's heat only
- Q = Qualified for the next round
- q = Qualified for the next round as a fastest loser or, in field events, by position without achieving the qualifying target
- NR = National record
- N/A = Round not applicable for the event
- Bye = Athlete not required to compete in round

Men
Track & road events

Athlete	Event	Heat		Quarterfinal		Semifinal		Final	
Athlete	Event	Result	Rank	Result	Rank	Result	Rank	Result	Rank
Dmytro Baranovskyy	Marathon	—N/a						DNF	
Serhiy Demydyuk	110 m hurdles	13.80	6	Did not advance					
Ivan Heshko	800 m	1:45.92	2 Q	—N/a		1:46.66	4	Did not advance	
Ivan Heshko	1500 m	3:37.78	3 Q	—N/a		3:36.20	5 Q	3:35.82	5
Serhiy Lebid	5000 m	14:10.23	17	—N/a				Did not advance	
Vadym Slobodenyuk	3000 m steeplechase	8:24.84	8	—N/a				Did not advance	
Volodymyr Demchenko; Myhaylo Knysh; Andriy Tverdostup; Yevgeniy Zyukov	4 × 400 m relay	3:04.01	6	—N/a				Did not advance	

Field events

Athlete	Event	Qualification		Final	
Athlete	Event	Distance	Position	Distance	Position
Yuriy Bilonoh	Shot put	20.61	4 Q	~~21.16~~	DSQ
Oleksandr Korchmid	Pole vault	5.70	14 Q	5.55	16
Oleksandr Krykun	Hammer throw	75.42	19	Did not advance	
Oleksiy Lukashevych	Long jump	DNS		Did not advance	
Vladyslav Piskunov	Hammer throw	NM	—	Did not advance	
Artem Rubanko	Hammer throw	75.08	20	Did not advance	
Mykola Savolaynen	Triple jump	16.56	20	Did not advance	
Andriy Sokolovskyy	High jump	2.28	=4 Q	2.32	5
Roman Virastyuk	Shot put	18.52	35	Did not advance	
Viktor Yastrebov	Triple jump	16.43	23	Did not advance	
Ruslan Yeremenko	Pole vault	5.70	=1 Q	5.55	=13
Denys Yurchenko	Pole vault	5.70	5 Q	5.65	=9
Volodymyr Zyuskov	Long jump	7.88	18	Did not advance	

Women
Track & road events

Athlete	Event	Heat		Quarterfinal		Semifinal		Final	
Athlete	Event	Result	Rank	Result	Rank	Result	Rank	Result	Rank
Nataliya Berkut	10000 m	—N/a						DNF	
Zhanna Block	100 m	11.27	2 Q	11.27	5 q	11.23	6	Did not advance	
Olena Krasovska	100 m hurdles	12.84	3 q	—N/a		12.58	3 Q	12.45	2nd place, silver medalist(s)
Iryna Lishchynska	1500 m	DNF		—N/a		Did not advance			
Maryna Maydanova	200 m	22.76	3 Q	22.86	3 Q	22.75	5	Did not advance	
Nelya Neporadna	1500 m	4:08.60	9	—N/a		Did not advance			
Tetyana Petlyuk	800 m	2:02.07	3 Q	—N/a		1:59.48	3	Did not advance	
Tetyana Tereshchuk-Antipova	400 m hurdles	54.63	2 Q	—N/a		53.37 NR	3 Q	53.44	3rd place, bronze medalist(s)
Tetyana Tkalich	100 m	11.58	4	Did not advance					
Nataliya Tobias	1500 m	4:06.06	=1 Q	—N/a		4:07.55	6	Did not advance	
Antonina Yefremova	400 m	51.53	3 Q	—N/a		51.90	6	Did not advance	
Vira Zozulya	20 km walk	—N/a						1:38:45	42
Zhanna Block; Iryna Kozhemyakina; Maryna Maydanova; Tetyana Tkalich	4 × 100 m relay	43.77	7	—N/a				Did not advance	
Oksana Ilyushkina; Nataliya Pyhyda; Oleksandra Ryzhkova; Antonina Yefremova	4 × 400 m relay	3:28.62	7	—N/a				Did not advance	

Field events

Athlete	Event	Qualification		Final	
Athlete	Event	Distance	Position	Distance	Position
Olena Antonova	Discus throw	64.20	3 Q	65.75	4
Inha Babakova	High jump	1.92	10 q	1.93	9
Anzhela Balakhonova	Pole vault	4.40	13 q	4.40	=6
Nataliya Fokina	Discus throw	58.28	24	Did not advance	
Olena Hovorova	Triple jump	14.56	=11 Q	14.35	10
Tetyana Lyakhovych	Javelin throw	63.07 NR	3 Q	61.75	8
Iryna Mykhalchenko	High jump	1.95	=1 Q	1.96	5
Iryna Sekachova	Hammer throw	71.63	4 Q	70.40	8
Tetyana Shchurenko	Triple jump	13.55	30	Did not advance	
Vita Styopina	High jump	1.95	=1 Q	2.02	3rd place, bronze medalist(s)
Oksana Zakharchuk	Shot put	17.28	20	Did not advance	

Combined events – Heptathlon

Athlete	Event	100H	HJ	SP	200 m	LJ	JT	800 m	Final	Rank
Yuliya Akulenko	Result	14.11	1.73	13.15	24.57	6.02	48.62	2:22.58	5996	23
Yuliya Akulenko	Points	963	891	737	927	856	833	789	5996	23
Nataliya Dobrynska	Result	13.89	1.82	14.70	25.02	6.23	44.08	2:17.01	6255	8
Nataliya Dobrynska	Points	994	1003	841	885	921	746	865	6255	8

== Boxing ==
The Ukrainian boxing team at the 2004 Olympics consisted of six boxers. Ihor Pashchuk also qualified for the Games in light welterweight but was not allowed to compete due to an eye injury. Only one was defeated in his first bout as four of the six boxers advanced to the quarterfinals. They all lost there, keeping Ukraine from winning any boxing medals.

Athlete	Event	Round of 32	Round of 16	Quarterfinals	Semifinals	Final	
Athlete	Event	Opposition Result	Opposition Result	Opposition Result	Opposition Result	Opposition Result	Rank
Maksym Tretyak	Bantamweight	Mendez (DOM); W 30–24	Bedák (HUN); W 27–24	Mammadov (AZE); L 12–32	Did not advance		
Volodymyr Kravets	Lightweight	Shah (PAK); L 17–21	Did not advance				
Viktor Polyakov	Welterweight	O'Mahony (AUS); W 54–27	Noël (FRA); W 32–25	Artayev (KAZ); L RSC	Did not advance		
Oleg Mashkin	Middleweight	Motau (RSA); W 25–22	Wilaschek (GER); W 34–24	Prasathinphimai (THA); L 22–28	Did not advance		
Andriy Fedchuk	Light heavyweight	Jitender (IND); W WO	Lei Yp (CHN); L 9–17	Did not advance			
Aleksey Masikin	Super heavyweight	—N/a	Apanasionak (BLR); W 23–5	Cammarelle (ITA); L 21–23	Did not advance		

== Canoeing ==
=== Sprint ===
Men

Athlete	Event	Heats		Semifinals		Final	
Athlete	Event	Time	Rank	Time	Rank	Time	Rank
Yuriy Cheban	C-1 500 m	2:00.238	6 q	1:53.385	6	Did not advance	
Yuriy Cheban	C-1 1000 m	4:00.637	6 q	DSQ		Did not advance	
Ruslan Dzhalilov; Maksym Prokopenko	C-2 500 m	1:44.532	5 q	1:42.860	4	Did not advance	
Ruslan Dzhalilov; Maksym Prokopenko	C-2 1000 m	3:36.075	6 q	3:35.740	6	Did not advance	

Women

Athlete	Event	Heats		Semifinals		Final	
Athlete	Event	Time	Rank	Time	Rank	Time	Rank
Hanna Balabanova; Olena Cherevatova; Inna Osypenko; Tetyana Semykina	K-4 500 m	1:33.057	2 Q	Bye		1:36.192	3rd place, bronze medalist(s)

Qualification Legend: Q = Qualify to final; q = Qualify to semifinal

== Cycling ==
=== Road ===
Men

Athlete	Event	Time	Rank
Vladimir Duma	Road race	Did not finish	
Serhiy Honchar	Road race	5:41:56	21
Serhiy Honchar	Time trial	1:00:44.31	22
Yuriy Krivtsov	Road race	Did not finish	
Yuriy Krivtsov	Time trial	59:49.40	11
Yaroslav Popovych	Road race	5:50:35	68
Kyrylo Pospyeyev	Road race	5:41:56	23

Women

Athlete	Event	Time	Rank
Iryna Chuzhynova	Road race	3:25:42	23
Nataliya Kachalka	Road race	3:28:39	36
Nataliya Kachalka	Time trial	35:01.05	24
Valentyna Karpenko	Road race	3:33:35	43

=== Track ===
Pursuit

Athlete	Event	Qualification		Semifinals		Final	
Athlete	Event	Time	Rank	Opponent Results	Rank	Opponent Results	Rank
Volodymyr Dyudya	Men's individual pursuit	4:18.169	5 Q	Hayles (GBR); 4:22.720	7	Did not advance	
Volodymyr Dyudya; Roman Kononenko; Sergiy Matveyev; Vitaliy Popkov	Men's team pursuit	4:07.175	6 Q	Spain; 4:05.266	6	Did not advance	

Omnium

Athlete	Event	Points	Laps	Rank
Vasyl Yakovlev	Men's points race	3	0	19
Lyudmyla Vypyraylo	Women's points race	−20	−2	18
Volodymyr Rybin; Vasyl Yakovlev	Men's madison	9	0	5

=== Mountain biking ===
Athlete	Event	Time	Rank
Serhiy Rysenko	Men's cross-country	2:33:10	36

== Diving ==
Ukrainian divers qualified for eight individual spots at the 2004 Olympic Games. One Ukrainian synchronized diving team qualified through the 2004 FINA Diving World Cup series.

Men

Athlete	Event	Preliminaries		Semifinals		Final	
Athlete	Event	Points	Rank	Points	Rank	Points	Rank
Dmytro Lysenko	3 m springboard	419.16	11 Q	638.73	11 Q	629.64	11
Yuriy Shlyakhov	3 m springboard	377.19	26	Did not advance			
Roman Volodkov	10 m platform	403.59	21	Did not advance			
Anton Zakharov	10 m platform	420.30	16 Q	596.07	16	Did not advance	
Roman Volodkov; Anton Zakharov	10 m synchronized platform	—N/a				357.66	4

Women

Athlete	Event	Preliminaries		Semifinals		Final	
Athlete	Event	Points	Rank	Points	Rank	Points	Rank
Olena Fedorova	3 m springboard	290.43	13 Q	212.85	13	Did not advance	
Hanna Sorokina	3 m springboard	269.52	16 Q	204.63	16	Did not advance	
Olha Leonova	10 m platform	271.92	23	Did not advance			
Olena Zhupina	10 m platform	371.10	1 Q	543.57	4 Q	497.70	9

== Fencing ==
Ten Ukrainian fencers, eight men and two women, qualified for the following events.

Men

Athlete	Event	Round of 64	Round of 32	Round of 16	Quarterfinal	Semifinal	Final / BM	
Athlete	Event	Opposition Score	Opposition Score	Opposition Score	Opposition Score	Opposition Score	Opposition Score	Rank
Dmytro Karyuchenko	Individual épée	Daidj (ALG); W 15–6	Marik (AUT); W 15–7	Strigel (GER); L 12–15	Did not advance			
Maksym Khvorost	Individual épée	Bye	Lee S-Y (KOR); L 11–15	Did not advance				
Bohdan Nikishyn	Individual épée	Nyisztor (ROM); L 6–15	Did not advance					
Dmytro Karyuchenko; Maksym Khvorost; Bohdan Nikishyn; Vitaliy Osharov	Team épée	—N/a			Hungary; L 34–38	Classification semi-final Egypt; W 45–36	5th place final United States; W 45–33	5
Volodymyr Kaliuzhniy	Individual sabre	Bye	Dyachenko (RUS); W 15–10	Lapkes (BLR); L 9–15	Did not advance			
Volodymyr Lukashenko	Individual sabre	Bye	Agresta (BRA); W 15–14	Kothny (THA); W 15–11	Tretiak (UKR); L 12–15	Did not advance		
Vladyslav Tretiak	Individual sabre	Bye	Lengyel (HUN); W 15–12	Tarantino (ITA); W 15–8	Lukashenko (UKR); W 15–12	Nemcsik (HUN); L 11–15	Lapkes (BLR); W 15–11	3rd place, bronze medalist(s)
Volodymyr Kaliuzhniy; Volodymyr Lukashenko; Oleh Shturbabin; Vladislav Tretiak	Team sabre	—N/a			Italy; L 44–45	Classification semi-final Greece; W 45–39	5th place final Hungary; L 40–45	6

Women

Athlete	Event	Round of 64	Round of 32	Round of 16	Quarterfinal	Semifinal	Final / BM	
Athlete	Event	Opposition Score	Opposition Score	Opposition Score	Opposition Score	Opposition Score	Opposition Score	Rank
Nadiya Kazimirchuk	Individual épée	Bye	Zhang L (CHN); L 9–10	Did not advance				
Darya Nedeshkowskaia	Individual sabre	—N/a	Argiolas (FRA); L 9–15	Did not advance				

== Gymnastics ==
=== Artistic ===
Men
Team

Athlete	Event	Qualification								Final							
Athlete	Event	Apparatus						Total	Rank	Apparatus						Total	Rank
Athlete	Event	F	PH	R	V	PB	HB	Total	Rank	F	PH	R	V	PB	HB	Total	Rank
Yevhen Bohonosiuk	Team	9.500	—N/a	9.437	8.962	—N/a	9.525	—N/a		9.512	—N/a				9.450	—N/a	
Valeriy Honcharov	Team	—N/a	9.425	—N/a		9.737 Q	9.737 Q	—N/a		—N/a	8.412	—N/a		9.787	9.737	—N/a	
Vadym Kuvakin	Team	9.475	9.337	9.600	9.500	8.912	—N/a			—N/a		9.625	9.562	—N/a			
Ruslan Myezyentsev	Team	9.650	9.425	9.687	9.475	9.437	9.037	56.711	13 Q	9.612	8.100	9.712	9.362	—N/a			
Andriy Mykaylichenko	Team	9.337	8.650	—N/a	9.550	9.575	8.300	—N/a		—N/a			8.925	9.562	9.375	—N/a	
Roman Zozulya	Team	9.487	9.562	9.725	9.337	9.712	9.450	57.273	8 Q	8.537	9.537	9.725	—N/a	9.712	—N/a		
Total	Team	38.112	37.749	38.449	37.862	38.461	37.749	228.382	5 Q	27.661	26.049	29.062	27.849	29.061	28.562	168.244	7

Individual finals

Athlete	Event	Apparatus						Total	Rank
Athlete	Event	F	PH	R	V	PB	HB	Total	Rank
Valeriy Honcharov	Parallel bars	—N/a				9.787	—N/a	9.787	1st place, gold medalist(s)
Valeriy Honcharov	Horizontal bar	—N/a					8.887	8.887	8
Ruslan Myezyentsev	All-around	9.512	8.975	9.387	9.437	9.637	9.112	56.060	16
Roman Zozulya	All-around	9.525	9.412	9.575	9.500	9.762	9.225	56.999	10

Women
Team

Athlete	Event	Qualification						Final					
Athlete	Event	Apparatus				Total	Rank	Apparatus				Total	Rank
Athlete	Event	V	UB	BB	F	Total	Rank	V	UB	BB	F	Total	Rank
Mirabella Akhunu	Team	9.237	8.187	8.350	9.475	35.249	49	8.975	—N/a				
Alina Kozich	Team	9.387	9.237	9.300	9.562 Q	37.486	10 Q	9.362	9.512	9.550	9.650	—N/a	
Iryna Krasnianska	Team	—N/a	9.575	9.112	—N/a	—N/a		—N/a	9.187	9.387	—N/a	—N/a	
Alona Kvasha	Team	9.412 Q	8.850	8.987	9.462	36.711	21	9.362	—N/a	—N/a	9.362	—N/a	—N/a
Olga Sherbatykh	Team	9.400	—N/a	—N/a	9.087	—N/a	9.375	—N/a					
Irina Yarotska	Team	9.262	9.037	9.475	9.375	37.149	15 Q	—N/a	9.500	9.087	—N/a		
Total	Team	37.461	36.699	36.874	37.874	148.908	5 Q	28.099	28.199	28.024	27.987	112.309	4

Individual finals

Athlete	Event	Apparatus				Total	Rank
Athlete	Event	V	UB	BB	F	Total	Rank
Alina Kozich	All-around	9.250	9.512	8.687	9.600	37.049	11
Alina Kozich	Floor	—N/a			8.500	8.500	8
Alona Kvasha	Vault	9.343	—N/a			9.343	6
Irina Yarotska	All-around	9.200	9.650	9.400	9.437	37.687	6

=== Rhythmic ===
Athlete	Event	Qualification						Final					
Athlete	Event	Hoop	Ball	Clubs	Ribbon	Total	Rank	Hoop	Ball	Clubs	Ribbon	Total	Rank
Anna Bessonova	Individual	25.900	26.750	26.750	25.325	104.725	3 Q	26.500	26.525	26.950	26.725	106.700	3rd place, bronze medalist(s)
Natalia Godunko	Individual	25.975	25.900	26.075	24.800	102.750	4 Q	25.500	25.800	26.375	26.125	103.800	5

Athlete	Event	Qualification				Final			
Athlete	Event	5 ribbons	3 hoops 2 balls	Total	Rank	5 ribbons	3 hoops 2 balls	Total	Rank
Maria Bila; Yulia Chernova; Olena Dzyubchuk; Yelyzaveta Karabash; Inga Kozhokhina; Oksana Paslas	Team	19.350	22.800	42.150	9	Did not advance			

=== Trampoline ===
Athlete	Event	Qualification		Final	
Athlete	Event	Score	Rank	Score	Rank
Yuri Nikitin	Men's	69.00	2 Q	41.50	1st place, gold medalist(s)
Olena Movchan	Women's	65.80	3 Q	37.60	5

== Handball ==
=== Women's tournament ===
Roster

The following is the Ukraine roster in the women's handball tournament of the 2004 Summer Olympics.

Head coaches: Leonid Ratner

No.	Pos.	Name	Date of birth (age)	Height	App.	Goals	Club
1	GK	Nataliya Borysenko	3 December 1975 (aged 28)	1.88 m			(North Macedonia) Kometal Skopje
3	LB	Ganna Burmystrova	16 June 1977 (aged 27)	1.82 m			(Ukraine) Motor Zaporizhzhia
4	CB	Tetyana Shynkarenko	26 October 1978 (aged 25)	1.75 m			(Austria) Hypo NÖ
5	RB	Maryna Vergelyuk	24 June 1978 (aged 26)	1.78 m			(Slovenia) RK Krim
6	RW	Olena Yatsenko	4 October 1977 (aged 26)	1.68 m			(Slovenia) RK Krim
7	CB	Ganna Siukalo	12 September 1976 (aged 27)	1.75 m			(Hungary) Váci NKSE
8	LW	Olena Radchenko	21 May 1973 (aged 31)	1.75 m			(North Macedonia) Kometal Skopje
9	LB	Olena Tsyhytsia	8 April 1975 (aged 29)	1.80 m			(North Macedonia) Kometal Skopje
10	P	Galyna Markushevska	16 July 1976 (aged 28)	1.92 m			(Ukraine) Motor Zaporizhzhia
11	P	Lyudmyla Shevchenko	4 February 1970 (aged 34)	1.83 m			(Ukraine) Motor Zaporizhzhia
12	GK	Iryna Honcharova	19 December 1974 (aged 29)	1.80 m			(Ukraine) Motor Zaporizhzhia
14	LW	Nataliya Lyapina	14 May 1976 (aged 28)	1.68 m			(Ukraine) Spartak Kyiv
15	LB	Anastasiia Pidpalova	5 January 1982 (aged 22)	1.92 m			(Ukraine) Motor Zaporizhzhia
16	GK	Larysa Zaspa	22 September 1971 (aged 32)	1.82 m			(Ukraine) Motor Zaporizhzhia
17	LW	Oxana Rayhel	24 February 1977 (aged 27)	1.62 m			(North Macedonia) Kometal Skopje

Group play

Pos	Team	Pld	W	D	L	GF	GA	GD	Pts	Qualification
1	Ukraine	4	4	0	0	99	82	+17	8	Quarterfinals
2	Hungary	4	3	0	1	118	93	+25	6	Quarterfinals
3	China	4	2	0	2	106	90	+16	4	Quarterfinals
4	Brazil	4	1	0	3	97	105	−8	2	Quarterfinals
5	Greece (H)	4	0	0	4	74	124	−50	0	

Rules for classification: 1) Points; 2) Head-to-head points; 3) Head-to-head goal difference; 4) Head-to-head goals scored; 5) Goal difference; 6) Goals scored; 7) Draw.
(H) Hosts

17 August 2004; 14:30	Ukraine	26 – 21	China	Sports Pavilion; Referees: Breto, Huelin Trillo (ESP)
17 August 2004; 14:30	Rayhel 9	(15-10)	Li Weiwei 7	Sports Pavilion; Referees: Breto, Huelin Trillo (ESP)
17 August 2004; 14:30	3× (yellow card) 5× (suspension)		3× (yellow card) 4× (suspension)	Sports Pavilion; Referees: Breto, Huelin Trillo (ESP)

19 August 2004; 19:30	Brazil	19 - 21	Ukraine	Sports Pavilion, Athens; Referees: Gardinovacki, Maric (SCG)
19 August 2004; 19:30	A. Silva 6	(10-10)	Yatsenko, Lyapina 5	Sports Pavilion, Athens; Referees: Gardinovacki, Maric (SCG)
19 August 2004; 19:30	3× (yellow card) 4× (suspension)		3× (yellow card) 4× (suspension)	Sports Pavilion, Athens; Referees: Gardinovacki, Maric (SCG)

21 August 2004; 16:30	Ukraine	29 - 20	Greece	Sports Pavilion; Referees: Gardinovacki, Maric (SCG)
21 August 2004; 16:30	Lyapina 7	(15-10)	Gkolia 10	Sports Pavilion; Referees: Gardinovacki, Maric (SCG)
21 August 2004; 16:30	3× (yellow card) 4× (suspension)		2× (yellow card) 3× (suspension)	Sports Pavilion; Referees: Gardinovacki, Maric (SCG)

23 August 2004; 19:30	Hungary	22 - 23	Ukraine	Sports Pavilion, Athens; Referees: Oie, Togstad (NOR)
23 August 2004; 19:30	Radulovics 9	(12-8)	Lyapina 8	Sports Pavilion, Athens; Referees: Oie, Togstad (NOR)
23 August 2004; 19:30	2× (yellow card) 7× (suspension)		3× (yellow card) 6× (suspension) 1× (red card)	Sports Pavilion, Athens; Referees: Oie, Togstad (NOR)

Quarterfinals

26 August 2004; 14:30	Ukraine	25 – 23	Spain	Helliniko Olympic Indoor Arena; Referees: Hansson, Olsson (SWE)
26 August 2004; 14:30	3 players with 4	(12-9)	Ortuno 6	Helliniko Olympic Indoor Arena; Referees: Hansson, Olsson (SWE)
26 August 2004; 14:30	3× (yellow card) 4× (suspension)		3× (yellow card) 2× (suspension)	Helliniko Olympic Indoor Arena; Referees: Hansson, Olsson (SWE)

Semifinals

27 August 2004; 21:30	Ukraine	20 – 29	Denmark	Helliniko Olympic Indoor Arena; Referees: Lemme, Ullrich (GER)
27 August 2004; 21:30	Lyapina 5	(11-13)	Fruelund 9	Helliniko Olympic Indoor Arena; Referees: Lemme, Ullrich (GER)
27 August 2004; 21:30	4× (yellow card) 4× (suspension)		3× (yellow card) 2× (suspension)	Helliniko Olympic Indoor Arena; Referees: Lemme, Ullrich (GER)

Bronze medal match

28 August 2004; 16:30	Ukraine	21 - 18	France	Helliniko Olympic Indoor Arena; Referees: Pozeznik, Repensek (SLO)
28 August 2004; 16:30	Vergelyuk 6	(10-10)	Lejeune 7	Helliniko Olympic Indoor Arena; Referees: Pozeznik, Repensek (SLO)
28 August 2004; 16:30	4× (yellow card) 8× (suspension) 1× (red card)		3× (yellow card) 2× (suspension)	Helliniko Olympic Indoor Arena; Referees: Pozeznik, Repensek (SLO)

Won bronze medal

== Judo ==
Eight Ukrainian judoka (six men and two women) qualified for the 2004 Summer Olympics.

Men

Athlete	Event	Round of 32	Round of 16	Quarterfinals	Semifinals	Repechage 1	Repechage 2	Repechage 3	Final / BM	
Athlete	Event	Opposition Result	Opposition Result	Opposition Result	Opposition Result	Opposition Result	Opposition Result	Opposition Result	Opposition Result	Rank
Musa Nastuyev	−66 kg	Pina (POR); L 0010–1100	Did not advance							
Gennadiy Bilodid	−73 kg	Awad (EGY); W WO	Yagoubi (ALG); W 1000–0000	Lee W-H (KOR); L 0000–1000	Did not advance	Bye	Pedro (USA); L 0001–0100	Did not advance		
Roman Hontyuk	−81 kg	Belgaid (MAR); W 1020–0000	Chahkhandagh (IRI); W 1001–0002	Wanner (GER); W 1020–0000	Krawczyk (POL); W 1011–0013	Bye			Iliadis (GRE); L 0000–1110	2nd place, silver medalist(s)
Valentyn Grekov	−90 kg	Alarza (ESP); W 0111–0010	Costa (ARG); L 0001–0112	Did not advance						
Vitaliy Bubon	−100 kg	Despaigne (CUB); L 0010–0100	Did not advance							
Vitaliy Polyanskyy	+100 kg	El Shehaby (EGY); W 1000–0000	Bianchessi (ITA); L 0000–0201	Did not advance		Kim S-B (KOR); L 0000–1000	Did not advance			

Women

Athlete	Event	Round of 32	Round of 16	Quarterfinals	Semifinals	Repechage 1	Repechage 2	Repechage 3	Final / BM	
Athlete	Event	Opposition Result	Opposition Result	Opposition Result	Opposition Result	Opposition Result	Opposition Result	Opposition Result	Opposition Result	Rank
Anastasiia Matrosova	−78 kg	Lee S-Y (KOR); W 1000–0000	Akritidou (GRE); W 1100–0000	Wilding (GBR); W 1000–0000	Liu X (CHN); L 0000–0010	Bye			Morico (ITA); L 0000–1000	5
Maryna Prokofyeva	+78 kg	Bye	Dolgormaa (MGL); W 0200–0001	Tsukada (JPN); L 0000–1012	Did not advance	Bye	Malone (AUS); W 1000–0000	Choi S-I (KOR); W 1000–0000	Sun Fm (CHN); L 0000–1000	5

== Modern pentathlon ==
One Ukrainian athlete qualified to compete in the modern pentathlon event through the European Championships.

Athlete	Event	Shooting (10 m air pistol)			Fencing (épée one touch)			Swimming (200 m freestyle)			Riding (show jumping)			Running (3000 m)			Total points	Final rank
Athlete	Event	Points	Rank	MP Points	Results	Rank	MP points	Time	Rank	MP points	Penalties	Rank	MP points	Time	Rank	MP Points	Total points	Final rank
Victoria Tereshchuk	Women's	178	11	1072	11–20	=29	692	2:19.98	9	1244	84	15	1116	10:44.68	2	1144	5256	7

== Rowing ==
Ukrainian rowers qualified the following boats:

Men

Athlete	Event	Heats		Repechage		Semifinals		Final	
Athlete	Event	Time	Rank	Time	Rank	Time	Rank	Time	Rank
Serhiy Biloushchenko; Serhiy Hryn; Oleh Lykov; Leonid Shaposhnykov	Quadruple sculls	5:43.23	2 SA/B	Bye		5:44.00	3 FA	5:58.87	3rd place, bronze medalist(s)

Women

Athlete	Event	Heats		Repechage		Final	
Athlete	Event	Time	Rank	Time	Rank	Time	Rank
Nataliya Huba; Svitlana Maziy	Double sculls	7:39.02	3 R	6:57.37	2 FA	7:21.78	6
Yana Dementyeva; Tetiana Kolesnikova; Olena Olefirenko; Olena Ronzhyna	Quadruple sculls	6:21.24	4 R	6:24.64	2 FA	6:34.31	DSQ

Qualification Legend: FA=Final A (medal); FB=Final B (non-medal); FC=Final C (non-medal); FD=Final D (non-medal); FE=Final E (non-medal); FF=Final F (non-medal); SA/B=Semifinals A/B; SC/D=Semifinals C/D; SE/F=Semifinals E/F; R=Repechage

== Sailing ==
Ukrainian sailors have qualified one boat for each of the following events.

Men

Athlete	Event	Race											Net points	Final rank
Athlete	Event	1	2	3	4	5	6	7	8	9	10	M*	Net points	Final rank
Maksym Oberemko	Mistral	20	14	7	13	20	20	~~DSQ~~	9	26	11	6	146	17
Yevhen Braslavets; Ihor Matviyenko	470	10	4	1	~~DNF~~	8	7	18	12	13	24	9	106	9

Women

Athlete	Event	Race											Net points	Final rank
Athlete	Event	1	2	3	4	5	6	7	8	9	10	M*	Net points	Final rank
Olha Maslivets	Mistral	5	4	11	12	10	~~DSQ~~	8	9	11	13	20	103	10
Hanna Kalinina; Svitlana Matevusheva; Ruslana Taran	Yngling	10	3	9	3	7	2	2	RDG	1	~~16~~	5	50	2nd place, silver medalist(s)

Open

Athlete	Event	Race																Net points	Final rank
Athlete	Event	1	2	3	4	5	6	7	8	9	10	11	12	13	14	15	M*	Net points	Final rank
Yuriy Orlov	Laser	36	32	23	29	24	36	~~40~~	36	35	30	—N/a					33	314	36
George Leonchuk; Rodion Luka	49er	4	~~15~~	3	7	2	~~10~~	7	5	9	5	3	10	6	5	3	3	72	2nd place, silver medalist(s)

M = Medal race; OCS = On course side of the starting line; DSQ = Disqualified; DNF = Did not finish; DNS= Did not start; RDG = Redress given

== Shooting ==
Eleven Ukrainian shooters (six men and five women) qualified to compete in the following events:

Men

Athlete	Event	Qualification		Final	
Athlete	Event	Points	Rank	Points	Rank
Artur Ayvazyan	10 m air rifle	591	=22	Did not advance	
Artur Ayvazyan	50 m rifle prone	594	=9	Did not advance	
Artur Ayvazyan	50 m rifle 3 positions	1166	4 Q	1261.0	7
Viktor Makarov	10 m air pistol	578	=17	Did not advance	
Viktor Makarov	50 m pistol	558	=10	Did not advance	
Mykola Milchev	Skeet	121	=9	Did not advance	
Vladyslav Prianishnikov	10 m running target	575	7	Did not advance	
Yuriy Sukhorukov	10 m air rifle	590	=24	Did not advance	
Yuriy Sukhorukov	50 m rifle prone	590	=32	Did not advance	
Yuriy Sukhorukov	50 m rifle 3 positions	1154	=26	Did not advance	
Oleh Tkachov	25 m rapid fire pistol	587	5 Q	688.7	4

Women

Athlete	Event	Qualification		Final	
Athlete	Event	Points	Rank	Points	Rank
Viktoria Chuyko	Trap	54	15	Did not advance	
Natallia Kalnysh	10 m air rifle	394	=14	Did not advance	
Natallia Kalnysh	50 m rifle 3 positions	579	8 Q	677.2	8
Yuliya Korostylova	10 m air pistol	382	=10	Did not advance	
Yuliya Korostylova	25 m pistol	570	26	Did not advance	
Olena Kostevych	10 m air pistol	384	8 Q	483.3 (10.2)	1st place, gold medalist(s)
Olena Kostevych	25 m pistol	569	=27	Did not advance	
Lessia Leskiv	10 m air rifle	394	=14	Did not advance	
Lessia Leskiv	50 m rifle 3 positions	575	=13	Did not advance	

== Swimming ==
Ukrainian swimmers earned qualifying standards in the following events (up to a maximum of 2 swimmers in each event at the A-standard time, and 1 at the B-standard time):

Men

Athlete	Event	Heat		Semifinal		Final	
Athlete	Event	Time	Rank	Time	Rank	Time	Rank
Serhiy Advena	200 m butterfly	1:58.41	14 Q	1:58.11	13	Did not advance	
Ihor Chervynskyy	1500 m freestyle	15:12.58	10	—N/a		Did not advance	
Valeriy Dymo	200 m breaststroke	2:15.52	20	Did not advance			
Serhiy Fesenko	400 m freestyle	3:53.41	21	—N/a		Did not advance	
Oleh Lisohor	100 m breaststroke	1:01.21	9 Q	1:01.07	=4 Q	1:02.42	8
Dmytro Nazarenko	400 m individual medley	4:26.15	26	—N/a		Did not advance	
Volodymyr Nikolaychuk	100 m backstroke	56.62	=27	Did not advance			
Volodymyr Nikolaychuk	200 m backstroke	2:03.21	25	Did not advance			
Andriy Serdinov	100 m butterfly	52.05	2 Q	51.74 EU	2 Q	51.36 EU	3rd place, bronze medalist(s)
Serhiy Serhieiev	200 m individual medley	2:03.26	22	Did not advance			
Vyacheslav Shyrshov	50 m freestyle	22.96	28	Did not advance			
Denys Sylantyev	100 m butterfly	53.46	21	Did not advance			
Denys Sylantyev	200 m butterfly	1:58.44	15 Q	1:57.93	10	Did not advance	
Dmytro Vereitinov	200 m freestyle	1:51.38	27	Did not advance			
Oleksandr Volynets	50 m freestyle	22.41	=8 Q	22.18	=5 Q	22.26	7
Yuriy Yegoshin	100 m freestyle	49.73	=17	Did not advance			
Pavlo Khnykin; Andriy Serdinov; Denys Syzonenko; Yuriy Yegoshin	4 × 100 m freestyle relay	3:18.95 NR	10	—N/a		Did not advance	
Serhiy Advena; Serhiy Fesenko; Maksym Kokosha; Dmytro Vereitinov	4 × 200 m freestyle relay	7:24.13	12	—N/a		Did not advance	
Valeriy Dymo*; Pavlo Illichov; Oleh Lisohor; Andriy Serdinov; Denys Sylantyev*; Yuriy Yegoshin	4 × 100 m medley relay	3:38.85	8 Q	—N/a		3:36.87	6

Women

Athlete	Event	Heat		Semifinal		Final	
Athlete	Event	Time	Rank	Time	Rank	Time	Rank
Iryna Amshennikova	100 m backstroke	1:02.57	19	Did not advance			
Iryna Amshennikova	200 m backstroke	2:14.49	14 Q	2:14.83	15	Did not advance	
Olha Beresnyeva	400 m freestyle	4:26.30	38	—N/a		Did not advance	
Olha Beresnyeva	800 m freestyle	8:57.96	20	—N/a		Did not advance	
Svitlana Bondarenko	100 m breaststroke	1:09.35	8 Q	1:08.28	6 Q	1:08.19	7
Yana Klochkova	200 m individual medley	2:13.40	2 Q	2:13.30	1 Q	2:11.14	1st place, gold medalist(s)
Yana Klochkova	400 m individual medley	4:38.36	1 Q	—N/a		4:34.83	1st place, gold medalist(s)
Olena Lapunova	200 m freestyle	2:02.71	22	Did not advance			
Iryna Maystruk	200 m breaststroke	2:37.42	29	Did not advance			
Olha Mukomol	50 m freestyle	25.96	23	Did not advance			
Olha Mukomol	100 m freestyle	57.12	31	Did not advance			
Nataliya Samorodina	200 m butterfly	2:17.15	27	Did not advance			
Kateryna Zubkova	100 m butterfly	1:02.22	30	Did not advance			
Svitlana Bondarenko; Yana Klochkova; Olha Mukomol; Kateryna Zubkova	4 × 100 m medley relay	4:09.79	10	—N/a		Did not advance	

== Synchronized swimming ==
Two Ukrainian synchronized swimmers qualified a spot in the women's duet.

Athlete	Event	Technical routine		Free routine (preliminary)			Free routine (final)		
Athlete	Event	Points	Rank	Points	Total (technical + free)	Rank	Points	Total (technical + free)	Rank
Iryna Hayvoronska; Daria Iushko	Duet	45.417	10	46.084	91.501	10 Q	45.834	91.251	11

== Taekwondo ==
Ukraine has qualified a single taekwondo jin.

Athlete	Event	Round of 16	Quarterfinals	Semifinals	Repechage 1	Repechage 2	Final / BM	
Athlete	Event	Opposition Result	Opposition Result	Opposition Result	Opposition Result	Opposition Result	Opposition Result	Rank
Oleksandr Shaposhnyk	Men's −58 kg	Abdullah (YEM); W 7–5	Salazar (MEX); L 2–6	Did not advance	Mercedes (DOM); L WO	Did not advance		7

== Tennis ==
Ukraine nominated two female tennis players to compete in the tournament.

Athlete	Event	Round of 64	Round of 32	Round of 16	Quarterfinals	Semifinals	Final / BM	
Athlete	Event	Opposition Score	Opposition Score	Opposition Score	Opposition Score	Opposition Score	Opposition Score	Rank
Tetyana Perebiynis	Women's singles	Randriantefy (MAD); W 6–3, 6–4	Sugiyama (JPN); L 5–7, 4–6	Did not advance				
Yuliya Beygelzimer; Tetyana Perebiynis	Women's doubles	—N/a	Navratilova / Raymond (USA); L 0–6, 2–6	Did not advance				

== Triathlon ==
Two Ukrainian triathletes qualified for the following events.

Athlete	Event	Swim (1.5 km)	Trans 1	Bike (40 km)	Trans 2	Run (10 km)	Total Time	Rank
Andriy Hlushchenko	Men's	18:05	22	Did not finish				
Volodymyr Polikarpenko	Men's	18:03	19	1:05:53	20	33:43	1:57:39.28	30

== Weightlifting ==
Nine Ukrainian weightlifters qualified for the following events:

Men

Athlete	Event	Snatch		Clean & Jerk		Total	Rank
Athlete	Event	Result	Rank	Result	Rank	Total	Rank
Anatoliy Mushyk	−94 kg	175	=7	212.5	7	387.5	8
Mykola Hordiychuk	−105 kg	185	=8	210	13	395	10
Ihor Razoronov	−105 kg	190	=4	230	=1	420	2nd place, silver medalist(s)
Oleksiy Kolokoltsev	+105 kg	195	=6	242.5	3	437.5	5
Hennadiy Krasylnykov	+105 kg	200	5	240	=4	440	4

Women

Athlete	Event	Snatch		Clean & Jerk		Total	Rank
Athlete	Event	Result	Rank	Result	Rank	Total	Rank
Nataliya Skakun	−63 kg	107.5	2	135 OR	1	242.5	1st place, gold medalist(s)
Vanda Maslovska	−69 kg	110	5	135	=4	245	5
Olha Korobka	+75 kg	125	=5	155	=4	280	7
Viktoriya Shaymardanova	+75 kg	130	=1	150	=8	280	5

== Wrestling ==
Key:
- VT - Victory by Fall.
- PP - Decision by Points - the loser with technical points.
- PO - Decision by Points - the loser without technical points.

Men's freestyle

Athlete	Event	Elimination Pool			Quarterfinal	Semifinal	Final / BM	
Athlete	Event	Opposition Result	Opposition Result	Rank	Opposition Result	Opposition Result	Opposition Result	Rank
Oleksandr Zakharuk	−55 kg	Orazgaliyev (KAZ); W 3–1 ^{PP}	Kantoyeu (BLR); W 3–1 ^{PP}	1 Q	Batirov (RUS); L 0–3 ^{PO}	Did not advance		7
Vasyl Fedoryshyn	−60 kg	Uulu (KGZ); W 3–1 ^{PP}	Wöller (HUN); W 3–0 ^{PO}	1 Q	Sissaouri (CAN); W 3–0 ^{PO}	Quintana (CUB); L 1–3 ^{PP}	Inoue (JPN); L 1–3 ^{PP}	4
Elbrus Tedeyev	−66 kg	Rondón (CUB); W 3–1 ^{PP}	Tushishvili (GEO); W 5–0 ^{VB}	1 Q	Taskoudis (GRE); W 3–1 ^{PP}	Spiridonov (KAZ); W 3–1 ^{PP}	Kelly (USA); W 3–1 ^{PP}	1st place, gold medalist(s)
Taras Danko	−84 kg	Aghaev (ARM); W 5–0 ^{EV}	Yavaşer (TUR); W 3–0 ^{PO}	1 Q	Moon E-J (KOR); L 1–3 ^{PP}	Did not advance		7
Vadim Tasoyev	−96 kg	Scherrer (SUI); W 3–1 ^{PP}	Gatsalov (RUS); L 0–3 ^{PO}	2	Did not advance			14
Serhii Priadun	−120 kg	Rodríguez (CUB); L 0–3 ^{PO}	Batzelas (GRE); L 0–3 ^{PO}	3	Did not advance			20

Men's Greco-Roman

Athlete	Event	Elimination Pool				Quarterfinal	Semifinal	Final / BM	
Athlete	Event	Opposition Result	Opposition Result	Opposition Result	Rank	Opposition Result	Opposition Result	Opposition Result	Rank
Oleksiy Vakulenko	−55 kg	Švehla (CZE); W 3–0 ^{PO}	Hall (USA); W 3–0 ^{PO}	—N/a	1 Q	Chochua (GEO); W 3–1 ^{PP}	Majoros (HUN); L 1–3 ^{PP}	Kiouregkian (GRE); L 1–3 ^{PP}	4
Oleksandr Khvoshch	−60 kg	Nazaryan (BUL); L 1–3 ^{PP}	El-Gharably (EGY); L 1–3 ^{PP}	—N/a	3	Did not advance			17
Armen Vardanyan	−66 kg	Izquierdo (COL); W 4–0 ^{ST}	Kvirkvelia (GEO); W 5–0 ^{EV}	Eroğlu (TUR); L 0–3 ^{PO}	2	Did not advance			5
Volodymyr Shatskykh	−74 kg	Samurgashev (RUS); L 0–3 ^{PO}	Schneider (GER); L 0–5 ^{VT}	Babulfath (SWE); W 5–0 ^{VB}	3	Did not advance			13
Oleksandr Daragan	−84 kg	Yerlikaya (TUR); L 0–3 ^{PO}	Thomberg (EST); W 3–0 ^{PO}	Metodiev (BUL); W 5–0 ^{VB}	2	Did not advance			6
David Saldadze	−96 kg	Nozadze (GEO); L 1–3 ^{PP}	Englich (GER); L 1–3 ^{PP}	—N/a	3	Did not advance			16

Women's freestyle

Athlete	Event	Elimination Pool				Classification	Semifinal	Final / BM	
Athlete	Event	Opposition Result	Opposition Result	Opposition Result	Rank	Opposition Result	Opposition Result	Opposition Result	Rank
Irini Merleni	−48 kg	Karamchakova (TJK); W 4–0 ^{ST}	Louati (TUN); W 4–0 ^{ST}	Psatha (GRE); W 4–0 ^{ST}	1 Q	Bye	Miranda (USA); W 3–0 ^{PO}	C Icho (JPN); W 3–1 ^{PP}	1st place, gold medalist(s)
Tetyana Lazareva	−55 kg	Karlsson (SWE); W 3–1 ^{PP}	Fonseca (PUR); W 5–0 ^{VT}	—N/a	3	Did not advance			8
Lyudmyla Holovchenko	−63 kg	K Icho (JPN); L 0–4 ^{ST}	Kartashova (RUS); L 0–3 ^{PO}	—N/a	3	Did not advance			12
Svetlana Saenko	−72 kg	Vryoni (GRE); W 4–0 ^{ST}	Burmaa (MGL); W 3–0 ^{PO}	—N/a	1 Q	Bye	Manyurova (RUS); L 0–4 ^{ST}	Hamaguchi (JPN); L 0–3 ^{PO}	4

== See also ==
- Ukraine at the 2004 Summer Paralympics
