= Ukraine at the Olympics =

- IOC code: UKR
- NOC: National Olympic Committee of Ukraine
- Website: www.noc-ukr.org (in Ukrainian and English)
- Medals Ranked 32nd: Gold 41 Silver 43 Bronze 76 Total 160

Summer appearances
- 1996; 2000; 2004; 2008; 2012; 2016; 2020; 2024; 2028

Winter appearances
- 1994; 1998; 2002; 2006; 2010; 2014; 2018; 2022; 2026

Other related appearances
- Austria (1896–1912); Hungary (1896–1912); Russian Empire (1900–1912); Czechoslovakia (1920–1936); Poland (1924–1936); Romania (1924–1936); Soviet Union (1952–1988); Unified Team (1992)

Ukraine first participated at the Olympic Games as an independent nation in 1994, and has sent athletes to compete in every Summer Olympic Games and Winter Olympic Games since then. The first athlete who won the gold medal for the yellow-blues was Oksana Baiul. However, for the first time the Ukrainian national flag and the Ukrainian state anthem sounded in 1992 when Oleg Kutscherenko from Luhansk Oblast won his gold medal in Barcelona as part of the so-called "Unified Team" of ex-Soviet republics.

Previously, athletes of modern Ukraine mostly competed as part of the Russian Empire (1900–1912) and the Soviet Union from 1952 to 1988, and after the dissolution of the Soviet Union, Ukrainian athletes were part of the Unified Team in 1992. Tatiana Gutsu became the best athlete of the Unified Team in 1992 from independent Ukraine.

Independently, Ukraine has won a total of 160 medals (151 medals at the Summer Games and 9 at the Winter Games) since it regained independence, with 41 of them gold, the second most amongst all post-Soviet states behind Russia. Gymnastics at summer and biathlon at winter are the nation's top medal-producing sports.

The National Olympic Committee of Ukraine was created in 1990 and recognized by the International Olympic Committee in 1993.

== Medal tables ==
=== Medals by Summer Games ===
Games	Athletes	Gold	Silver	Bronze	Total	Rank
1896–1912	as part of the Russian Empire, Austria and Hungary					
1920 Antwerp	as part of Czechoslovakia					
1924–1936	as part of Czechoslovakia, Poland and Romania					
1948 London	did not participate					
1952–1988	as part of the Soviet Union					
1992 Barcelona	as part of the Unified Team					
1996 Atlanta	231	9	2	12	23	9
2000 Sydney	230	3	10	10	23	21
2004 Athens	239	8	5	9	22	13
2008 Beijing	243	7	4	11	22	12
2012 London	238	5	4	10	19	14
2016 Rio de Janeiro	203	2	5	4	11	31
2020 Tokyo	155	1	6	12	19	44
2024 Paris	140	3	5	4	12	22
2028 Los Angeles	future event					
2032 Brisbane	future event					
Total		38	41	72	151	34

=== Medals by Winter Games ===
Games	Athletes	Gold	Silver	Bronze	Total	Rank
1924 Chamonix	as part of Czechoslovakia and Poland					
1928–1936	as part of Czechoslovakia, Poland and Romania					
1948 St. Moritz	did not participate					
1952 Oslo	did not participate					
1956–1988	as part of the Soviet Union					
1992 Albertville	as part of the Unified Team					
1994 Lillehammer	37	1	0	1	2	13
1998 Nagano	56	0	1	0	1	18
2002 Salt Lake City	68	0	0	0	0	–
2006 Turin	52	0	0	2	2	25
2010 Vancouver	47	0	0	0	0	–
2014 Sochi	43	1	0	1	2	20
2018 Pyeongchang	33	1	0	0	1	21
2022 Beijing	45	0	1	0	1	25
2026 Milano Cortina	46	0	0	0	0	–
2030 French Alps	future event					
2034 Utah	future event					
Total		3	2	4	9	31

=== Medals by summer sport ===
Sport	Gold	Silver	Bronze	Total
Gymnastics	7	5	8	20
Boxing	5	4	7	16
Wrestling	4	8	9	21
Shooting	4	3	3	10
Swimming	4	3	2	9
Canoeing	3	4	4	11
Athletics	3	3	15	21
Fencing	3	1	5	9
Weightlifting	2	1	2	5
Sailing	1	2	2	5
Archery	1	1	2	4
Rowing	1	1	1	3
Cycling	0	2	2	4
Judo	0	1	3	4
Karate	0	1	1	2
Modern pentathlon	0	1	0	1
Artistic swimming	0	0	2	2
Diving	0	0	2	2
Handball	0	0	1	1
Tennis	0	0	1	1
Totals (20 entries)	38	41	72	151

=== Medals by winter sport ===
Sport	Gold	Silver	Bronze	Total
Biathlon	1	1	3	5
Freestyle skiing	1	1	0	2
Figure skating	1	0	1	2
Totals (3 entries)	3	2	4	9

== List of medalists ==
=== Summer Olympics ===
Medal	Name	Games	Sport	Event
Gold	Inessa Kravets	1996 Atlanta	Athletics	Women's triple jump
Gold	Wladimir Klitschko	1996 Atlanta	Boxing	Men's super heavyweight
Gold	Rustam Sharipov	1996 Atlanta	Gymnastics	Men's parallel bars
Gold	Lilia Podkopayeva	1996 Atlanta	Gymnastics	Women's artistic individual all-around
Gold	Lilia Podkopayeva	1996 Atlanta	Gymnastics	Women's floor exercise
Gold	Kateryna Serebrianska	1996 Atlanta	Gymnastics	Women's rhythmic individual all-around
Gold	Yevhen Braslavets; Ihor Matviyenko	1996 Atlanta	Sailing	Men's 470 class
Gold	Timur Taymazov	1996 Atlanta	Weightlifting	Men's 108 kg
Gold	Vyacheslav Oliynyk	1996 Atlanta	Wrestling	Men's Greco-Roman 90 kg
Silver	Lilia Podkopayeva	1996 Atlanta	Gymnastics	Women's balance beam
Silver	Inna Frolova; Svitlana Maziy; Dina Miftakhutdynova; Olena Ronzhyna	1996 Atlanta	Rowing	Women's quadruple sculls
Bronze	Olena Sadovnycha	1996 Atlanta	Archery	Women's individual
Bronze	Oleksandr Krykun	1996 Atlanta	Athletics	Men's hammer throw
Bronze	Oleksandr Bagach	1996 Atlanta	Athletics	Men's shot put
Bronze	Inha Babakova	1996 Atlanta	Athletics	Women's high jump
Bronze	Oleh Kyryukhin	1996 Atlanta	Boxing	Men's light flyweight
Bronze	Ihor Korobchynskyi; Oleh Kosyak; Hrihoriy Misyutin; Volodymyr Shamenko; Rustam Sharipov; Olexander Svitlichni; Yuri Yermakov	1996 Atlanta	Gymnastics	Men's artistic team all-around
Bronze	Olena Vitrychenko	1996 Atlanta	Gymnastics	Women's rhythmic individual all-around
Bronze	Olena Pakholchyk; Ruslana Taran	1996 Atlanta	Sailing	Women's 470 class
Bronze	Denys Hotfrid	1996 Atlanta	Weightlifting	Men's 99 kg
Bronze	Elbrus Tedeyev	1996 Atlanta	Wrestling	Men's freestyle 62 kg
Bronze	Zaza Zazirov	1996 Atlanta	Wrestling	Men's freestyle 68 kg
Bronze	Andriy Kalashnykov	1996 Atlanta	Wrestling	Men's Greco-Roman 52 kg
Gold	Mykola Milchev	2000 Sydney	Shooting	Men's skeet
Gold	Yana Klochkova	2000 Sydney	Swimming	Women's 200 metre individual medley
Gold	Yana Klochkova	2000 Sydney	Swimming	Women's 400 metre individual medley
Silver	Nataliya Burdeyna; Olena Sadovnycha; Kateryna Serdyuk	2000 Sydney	Archery	Women's team
Silver	Andriy Kotelnyk	2000 Sydney	Boxing	Men's lightweight
Silver	Serhiy Dotsenko	2000 Sydney	Boxing	Men's welterweight
Silver	Serhiy Cherniavskiy; Sergiy Matveyev; Alexander Symonenko; Oleksandr Fedenko	2000 Sydney	Cycling	Men's team pursuit
Silver	Olexandr Beresch; Valeriy Honcharov; Ruslan Mezentsev; Valeri Pereshkura; Olexander Svitlichni; Roman Zozulya	2000 Sydney	Gymnastics	Men's artistic team all-around
Silver	Oxana Tsyhuleva	2000 Sydney	Gymnastics	Women's trampoline
Silver	Denys Sylantyev	2000 Sydney	Swimming	Men's 200 metre butterfly
Silver	Yana Klochkova	2000 Sydney	Swimming	Women's 800 metre freestyle
Silver	Yevhen Buslovych	2000 Sydney	Wrestling	Men's freestyle 58 kg
Silver	Davyd Saldadze	2000 Sydney	Wrestling	Men's Greco-Roman 97 kg
Bronze	Roman Shchurenko	2000 Sydney	Athletics	Men's long jump
Bronze	Olena Hovorova	2000 Sydney	Athletics	Women's triple jump
Bronze	Volodymyr Sydorenko	2000 Sydney	Boxing	Men's flyweight
Bronze	Serhiy Danylchenko	2000 Sydney	Boxing	Men's bantamweight
Bronze	Andriy Fedchuk	2000 Sydney	Boxing	Men's light heavyweight
Bronze	Iryna Yanovych	2000 Sydney	Cycling	Women's sprint
Bronze	Ganna Sorokina; Olena Zhupina	2000 Sydney	Diving	Women's synchronized 3 metre springboard
Bronze	Oleksandr Beresh	2000 Sydney	Gymnastics	Men's artistic individual all-around
Bronze	Ruslan Mashurenko	2000 Sydney	Judo	Men's 90 kg
Bronze	Olena Pakholchyk; Ruslana Taran	2000 Sydney	Sailing	Women's 470 class
Gold	Valeriy Honcharov	2004 Athens	Gymnastics	Men's parallel bars
Gold	Yuri Nikitin	2004 Athens	Gymnastics	Men's trampoline
Gold	Olena Kostevych	2004 Athens	Shooting	Women's 10 metre air pistol
Gold	Yana Klochkova	2004 Athens	Swimming	Women's 200 metre individual medley
Gold	Yana Klochkova	2004 Athens	Swimming	Women's 400 metre individual medley
Gold	Nataliya Skakun	2004 Athens	Weightlifting	Women's 63 kg
Gold	Elbrus Tedeyev	2004 Athens	Wrestling	Men's freestyle 66 kg
Gold	Iryna Merleni	2004 Athens	Wrestling	Women's freestyle 48 kg
Silver	Olena Krasovska	2004 Athens	Athletics	Women's 100 metres hurdles
Silver	Roman Hontyuk	2004 Athens	Judo	Men's 81 kg
Silver	George Leonchuk; Rodion Luka	2004 Athens	Sailing	49er class
Silver	Ganna Kalinina; Svitlana Matevusheva; Ruslana Taran	2004 Athens	Sailing	Yngling class
Silver	Ihor Razoronov	2004 Athens	Weightlifting	Men's 105 kg
Bronze	Dmytro Hrachov; Viktor Ruban; Oleksandr Serdyuk	2004 Athens	Archery	Men's team
Bronze	Tetyana Tereshchuk-Antipova	2004 Athens	Athletics	Women's 400 metres hurdles
Bronze	Vita Styopina	2004 Athens	Athletics	Women's high jump
Bronze	Hanna Balabanova; Olena Cherevatova; Inna Osypenko; Tetyana Semykina	2004 Athens	Canoeing	Women's K-4 500 metres
Bronze	Vladyslav Tretiak	2004 Athens	Fencing	Men's sabre
Bronze	Anna Bessonova	2004 Athens	Gymnastics	Women's rhythmic individual all-around
Bronze	Handball team: Anastasiya Borodina Nataliya Borysenko Ganna Burmystrova Iryna Honcharova Nataliya Lyapina Galyna Markushevska Olena Radchenko Oxana Rayhel Lyudmyla Shevchenko Tetyana Shynkarenko Ganna Siukalo Olena Tsyhytsia Maryna Vergelyuk Olena Yatsenko Larysa Zaspa	2004 Athens	Handball	Women's tournament
Bronze	Serhiy Biloushchenko; Serhiy Hryn; Oleh Lykov; Leonid Shaposhnykov	2004 Athens	Rowing	Men's quadruple sculls
Bronze	Andriy Serdinov	2004 Athens	Swimming	Men's 100 metre butterfly
Gold	Viktor Ruban	2008 Beijing	Archery	Men's individual
Gold	Nataliya Dobrynska	2008 Beijing	Athletics	Women's heptathlon
Gold	Vasyl Lomachenko	2008 Beijing	Boxing	Men's featherweight
Gold	Inna Osypenko	2008 Beijing	Canoeing	Women's K-1 500 metres
Gold	Olha Kharlan; Olena Khomrova; Halyna Pundyk; Olha Zhovnir	2008 Beijing	Fencing	Women's team sabre
Gold	Oleksandr Petriv	2008 Beijing	Shooting	Men's 25 metre rapid fire pistol
Gold	Artur Ayvazyan	2008 Beijing	Shooting	Men's 50 metre rifle prone
Silver	Iryna Lishchynska	2008 Beijing	Athletics	Women's 1500 metres
Silver	Jury Sukhorukov	2008 Beijing	Shooting	Men's 50 metre rifle three positions
Silver	Andriy Stadnik	2008 Beijing	Wrestling	Men's freestyle 66 kg
Silver	Olena Antonova	2008 Beijing	Athletics	Women's discus throw
Bronze	Nataliya Tobias	2008 Beijing	Athletics	Women's 1500 metres
Bronze	Vyacheslav Glazkov	2008 Beijing	Boxing	Men's super heavyweight
Bronze	Yuriy Cheban	2008 Beijing	Canoeing	Men's C-1 500 metres
Bronze	Lesya Kalytovska	2008 Beijing	Cycling	Women's individual pursuit
Bronze	Illya Kvasha; Oleksiy Pryhorov	2008 Beijing	Diving	Men's synchronized 3 metre springboard
Bronze	Oleksandr Vorobiov	2008 Beijing	Gymnastics	Men's rings
Bronze	Anna Bessonova	2008 Beijing	Gymnastics	Women's rhythmic individual all-around
Bronze	Roman Hontyuk	2008 Beijing	Judo	Men's 81 kg
Bronze	Taras Danko	2008 Beijing	Wrestling	Men's freestyle 84 kg
Bronze	Armen Vardanyan	2008 Beijing	Wrestling	Men's Greco-Roman 66 kg
Bronze	Iryna Merleni	2008 Beijing	Wrestling	Women's freestyle 48 kg
Gold	Vasyl Lomachenko	2012 London	Boxing	Men's lightweight
Gold	Oleksandr Usyk	2012 London	Boxing	Men's heavyweight
Gold	Yuriy Cheban	2012 London	Canoeing	Men's C-1 200 metres
Gold	Yana Shemyakina	2012 London	Fencing	Women's épée
Gold	Yana Dementyeva; Nataliya Dovhodko; Anastasiya Kozhenkova; Kateryna Tarasenko	2012 London	Rowing	Women's quadruple sculls
Silver	Denys Berinchyk	2012 London	Boxing	Men's light welterweight
Silver	Inna Osypenko	2012 London	Canoeing	Women's K-1 200 metres
Silver	Inna Osypenko	2012 London	Canoeing	Women's K-1 500 metres
Silver	Valeriy Andriytsev	2012 London	Wrestling	Men's freestyle 96 kg
Bronze	Olesya Povh; Hrystyna Stuy; Mariya Ryemyen; Yelyzaveta Bryzhina	2012 London	Athletics	Women's 4 × 100 metres relay
Bronze	Olha Saladuha	2012 London	Athletics	Women's triple jump
Bronze	Taras Shelestyuk	2012 London	Boxing	Men's welterweight
Bronze	Oleksandr Hvozdyk	2012 London	Boxing	Men's light heavyweight
Bronze	Olha Kharlan	2012 London	Fencing	Women's sabre
Bronze	Ihor Radivilov	2012 London	Gymnastics	Men's vault
Bronze	Olena Kostevych	2012 London	Shooting	Women's 10 metre air pistol
Bronze	Olena Kostevych	2012 London	Shooting	Women's 25 metre pistol
Bronze	Yulia Paratova	2012 London	Weightlifting	Women's 53 kg
Bronze	Alina Lohvynenko; Olha Zemlyak; Hanna Yaroshchuk; Nataliya Pyhyda	2012 London	Athletics	Women's 4 × 400 metres relay
Gold	Yuriy Cheban	2016 Rio de Janeiro	Canoeing	Men's C-1 200 metres
Gold	Oleg Verniaiev	2016 Rio de Janeiro	Gymnastics	Men's parallel bars
Silver	Olha Kharlan; Alina Komashchuk; Olena Kravatska; Olena Voronina	2016 Rio de Janeiro	Fencing	Women's team sabre
Silver	Oleg Verniaiev	2016 Rio de Janeiro	Gymnastics	Men's artistic individual all-around
Silver	Pavlo Tymoshchenko	2016 Rio de Janeiro	Modern pentathlon	Men's individual
Silver	Serhiy Kulish	2016 Rio de Janeiro	Shooting	Men's 10 m air rifle
Silver	Zhan Beleniuk	2016 Rio de Janeiro	Wrestling	Men's Greco-Roman 85 kg
Bronze	Bohdan Bondarenko	2016 Rio de Janeiro	Athletics	Men's high jump
Bronze	Dmytro Ianchuk; Taras Mishchuk	2016 Rio de Janeiro	Canoeing	Men's C-2 1000 m
Bronze	Olha Kharlan	2016 Rio de Janeiro	Fencing	Women's sabre
Bronze	Ganna Rizatdinova	2016 Rio de Janeiro	Gymnastics	Women's rhythmic individual all-around
Gold	Zhan Beleniuk	2020 Tokyo	Wrestling	Men's Greco-Roman 87 kg
Silver	Mykhailo Romanchuk	2020 Tokyo	Swimming	Men's 1500 metre freestyle
Silver	Parviz Nasibov	2020 Tokyo	Wrestling	Men's Greco-Roman 67 kg
Silver	Anzhelika Terliuga	2020 Tokyo	Karate	Women's 55 kg
Silver	Liudmyla Luzan; Anastasiia Chetverikova	2020 Tokyo	Canoeing	Women's C-2 500 metres
Silver	Oleksandr Khyzhniak	2020 Tokyo	Boxing	Men's middleweight
Silver	Olena Starikova	2020 Tokyo	Cycling	Women's sprint
Bronze	Daria Bilodid	2020 Tokyo	Judo	Women's 48 kg
Bronze	Ihor Reizlin	2020 Tokyo	Fencing	Men's épée
Bronze	Olena Kostevych; Oleh Omelchuk	2020 Tokyo	Shooting	Mixed 10 metre air pistol team
Bronze	Mykhailo Romanchuk	2020 Tokyo	Swimming	Men's 800 metre freestyle
Bronze	Elina Svitolina	2020 Tokyo	Tennis	Women's singles
Bronze	Alla Cherkasova	2020 Tokyo	Wrestling	Women's freestyle 68 kg
Bronze	Marta Fiedina; Anastasiya Savchuk	2020 Tokyo	Artistic swimming	Women's duet
Bronze	Iryna Koliadenko	2020 Tokyo	Wrestling	Women's freestyle 62 kg
Bronze	Liudmyla Luzan	2020 Tokyo	Canoeing	Women's C-1 200 metres
Bronze	Stanislav Horuna	2020 Tokyo	Karate	Men's 75 kg
Bronze	Artistic swimming team: Maryna Aleksiiva Vladyslava Aleksiiva Marta Fiedina Kateryna Reznik Anastasiya Savchuk Alina Shynkarenko Kseniya Sydorenko Yelyzaveta Yakhno	2020 Tokyo	Artistic swimming	Women's team
Bronze	Yaroslava Mahuchikh	2020 Tokyo	Athletics	Women's high jump
Gold	Olha Kharlan; Alina Komashchuk; Olena Kravatska; Yuliya Bakastova	2024 Paris	Fencing	Women's team sabre
Gold	Yaroslava Mahuchikh	2024 Paris	Athletics	Women's high jump
Gold	Oleksandr Khyzhniak	2024 Paris	Boxing	Men's 80 kg
Silver	Serhiy Kulish	2024 Paris	Shooting	Men's 50 metre rifle three positions
Silver	Illia Kovtun	2024 Paris	Gymnastics	Men's parallel bars
Silver	Parviz Nasibov	2024 Paris	Wrestling	Men's Greco-Roman 67 kg
Silver	Liudmyla Luzan; Anastasiia Rybachok	2024 Paris	Canoeing	Women's C-2 500 metres
Silver	Iryna Koliadenko	2024 Paris	Wrestling	Women's freestyle 62 kg
Bronze	Olha Kharlan	2024 Paris	Fencing	Women's sabre
Bronze	Iryna Herashchenko	2024 Paris	Athletics	Women's high jump
Bronze	Mykhaylo Kokhan	2024 Paris	Athletics	Men's hammer throw
Bronze	Zhan Beleniuk	2024 Paris	Wrestling	Men's Greco-Roman 87 kg

=== Winter Olympics ===
Medal	Name	Games	Sport	Event
Gold	Oksana Baiul	1994 Lillehammer	Figure skating	Ladies' singles
Bronze	Valentina Tserbe	1994 Lillehammer	Biathlon	Women's sprint
Silver	Olena Petrova	1998 Nagano	Biathlon	Women's individual
Bronze	Lilia Efremova	2006 Turin	Biathlon	Women's sprint
Bronze	Elena Grushina; Ruslan Goncharov	2006 Turin	Figure skating	Ice dancing
Gold	Vita Semerenko; Juliya Dzhyma; Valj Semerenko; Olena Pidhrushna	2014 Sochi	Biathlon	Women's relay
Bronze	Vita Semerenko	2014 Sochi	Biathlon	Women's sprint
Gold	Oleksandr Abramenko	2018 Pyeongchang	Freestyle skiing	Men's aerials
Silver	Oleksandr Abramenko	2022 Beijing	Freestyle skiing	Men's aerials

== Flag bearers ==
- 1994 Lillehammer – Viktor Petrenko
- 1996 Atlanta – Sergey Bubka
- 1998 Nagano – Andriy Deryzemlya
- 2000 Sydney – Yevhen Braslavets
- 2002 Salt Lake City – Olena Petrova
- 2004 Athens – Denys Sylantyev
- 2006 Turin – Natalia Yakushenko
- 2008 Beijing – Yana Klochkova
- 2010 Vancouver – Liliya Ludan
- 2012 London – Roman Hontyuk
- 2014 Sochi – Valentina Shevchenko
- 2016 Rio de Janeiro – Mykola Milchev
- 2018 Pyeongchang – Olena Bilosiuk
- 2020 Tokyo – Olena Kostevych, Bohdan Nikishyn
- 2022 Beijing – Oleksandr Abramenko, Oleksandra Nazarova
- 2024 Paris – Elina Svitolina, Mykhailo Romanchuk

== Olympic participants ==
=== Summer Olympics ===
Sport	1996	2000	2004	2008	2012	2016	2020	2024	Years
Archery	6	6	6	5	6	4	4	2	8
Artistic swimming	—	2	2	2	2	9	8	2	7
Athletics	44	55	51	70	78	65	44	25	8
Badminton	3	3	—	2	2	2	2	1	7
Basketball	12	—							1
Boxing	7	11	6	7	7	5	5	3	8
Breaking								3	1
Canoeing	13	11	7	6	2	9	11	9	8
Cycling	12	14	16	16	10	7	5	4	8
Diving	6	9	8	9	9	7	6	9	8
Equestrian	—			4	5	5	2	—	4
Fencing	6	10	10	10	8	10	6	8	8
Football	—							22	1
Gymnastics	16	16	22	18	13	15	12	12	8
Handball	—		15	—					1
Judo	3	6	8	9	10	7	7	5	8
Karate							3		1
Modern pentathlon	1	3	1	3	4	3	1	3	8
Rowing	20	12	10	10	21	8	2	6	8
Sailing	12	11	10	6	4	3	—		6
Shooting	9	6	11	12	8	5	6	6	8
Sport climbing							—	2	1
Swimming	13	25	27	23	14	7	9	5	8
Table tennis	—	1	—	3	4	2	3	3	6
Taekwondo		—	1	—	2	—			2
Tennis	—	2	2	4	2	6	4	6	7
Triathlon		2	2	3	2	1	1	—	6
Volleyball	12	—							1
Water polo	13	—							1
Weightlifting	7	10	9	9	9	8	2	1	8
Wrestling	17	16	16	16	13	11	10	9	8
Total	231	230	240	243	238	206	155	140	

=== Winter Olympics ===
Sport	1994	1998	2002	2006	2010	2014	2018	2022	2026	Years
Alpine skiing	2	2	2	2	3	2	2	2	2	9
Biathlon	10	10	11	10	11	11	11	10	10	9
Bobsleigh	4	2	5	—				1	—	4
Cross country skiing	1	10	6	11	8	8	4	7	6	9
Figure skating	10	10	11	11	7	6	4	6	1	9
Freestyle skiing	3	7	3	7	6	7	3	5	9	9
Ice hockey	—		22	—						1
Luge	3	6	4	6	6	6	6	6	10	9
Nordic combined	1	—		2	1	1	1	1	2	7
Short track speed skating	—	2	1	1	—	1	—	2	2	6
Skeleton			—				1	1	1	3
Ski jumping	1	3	1	1	3	—		3	2	7
Snowboarding		—			2	2	1	1	1	5
Speed skating	2	4	2	—						3
Total	37	56	68	52	47	43	33	45	46	

== Multiple medal winners ==
Athlete	Sex	Sport	Years	Games	Gold	Silver	Bronze	Total
Yana Klochkova	F	Swimming	2000–2004	Summer	4	1	0	5
Olha Kharlan	F	Fencing	2008–2024	Summer	2	1	3	6
Lilia Podkopayeva	F	Gymnastics	1996	Summer	2	1	0	3
Yuriy Cheban	M	Canoeing	2004–2016	Summer	2	0	1	3
Vasyl Lomachenko	M	Boxing	2008–2012	Summer	2	0	0	2
Inna Osypenko	F	Canoeing	2004–2012	Summer	1	2	1	4
Zhan Beleniuk	M	Wrestling	2016–2024	Summer	1	1	1	3
Valeriy Honcharov	M	Gymnastics	2000–2008	Summer	1	1	0	2
Oleksandr Abramenko	M	Freestyle skiing	2006–2022	Winter	1	1	0	2
Alina Komashchuk	F	Fencing	2016–2024	Summer	1	1	0	2
Olena Kravatska	F	Fencing	2016–2024	Summer	1	1	0	2
Oleg Verniaiev	M	Gymnastics	2016, 2024	Summer	1	1	0	2
Oleksandr Khyzhniak	M	Boxing	2020–2024	Summer	1	1	0	2
Olena Kostevych	F	Shooting	2004–2024	Summer	1	0	3	4
Rustam Sharipov	M	Gymnastics	1996	Summer	1	0	1	2
Elbrus Tedeyev	M	Wrestling	1996–2004	Summer	1	0	1	2
Iryna Merleni	F	Wrestling	2004–2012	Summer	1	0	1	2
Viktor Ruban	M	Archery	2004–2016	Summer	1	0	1	2
Vita Semerenko	F	Biathlon	2010–2018	Winter	1	0	1	2
Yaroslava Mahuchikh	F	Athletics	2020–2024	Summer	1	0	1	2
Liudmyla Luzan	F	Canoeing	2020–2024	Summer	0	2	1	3
Serhiy Kulish	M	Shooting	2012–2024	Summer	0	2	0	2
Parviz Nasibov	M	Wrestling	2020–2024	Summer	0	2	0	2
Anastasiia Rybachok	F	Canoeing	2020–2024	Summer	0	2	0	2
Ruslana Taran	F	Sailing	1996–2004	Summer	0	1	2	3
Oleksandr Svitlychniy	M	Gymnastics	1996–2000	Summer	0	1	1	2
Olena Sadovnycha	F	Archery	1996–2000	Summer	0	1	1	2
Oleksandr Beresch	M	Gymnastics	2000	Summer	0	1	1	2
Roman Hontyuk	M	Judo	2004–2008	Summer	0	1	1	2
Mykhailo Romanchuk	M	Swimming	2016–2024	Summer	0	1	1	2
Iryna Koliadenko	F	Wrestling	2020–2024	Summer	0	1	1	2
Anna Bessonova	F	Gymnastics	2004–2008	Summer	0	0	2	2
Anastasiya Savchuk	F	Artistic swimming	2016–2020	Summer	0	0	2	2
Marta Fiedina	F	Artistic swimming	2020	Summer	0	0	2	2

== List of Soviet medalists ==
List of Soviet medalists who represented Soviet clubs out of the Ukrainian Soviet Socialist Republic and recognized by the Ukrainian NOC.

=== Summer Olympics ===
Medal	Name	Games	Sport	Event
Gold	Nina Bocharova	1952 Helsinki	Gymnastics	Women's balance beam
Gold	Maria Gorokhovskaya	1952 Helsinki	Gymnastics	Women's all around (ind.)
Gold	Soviet team	1952 Helsinki	Gymnastics	Women's all around (2 out of 8)
Gold	Viktor Chukarin	1952 Helsinki	Gymnastics	Men's vault
Gold	Viktor Chukarin	1952 Helsinki	Gymnastics	Men's pommel horse
Gold	Viktor Chukarin	1952 Helsinki	Gymnastics	Men's all around (ind.)
Gold	Soviet team	1952 Helsinki	Gymnastics	Men's all around (2 out of 8)
Gold	Yakiv Punkin	1952 Helsinki	Wrestling	Men's Greco-Roman
Silver	Nina Bocharova	1952 Helsinki	Gymnastics	Women's all around (ind.)
Silver	Maria Gorokhovskaya	1952 Helsinki	Gymnastics	Women's balance beam
Silver	Maria Gorokhovskaya	1952 Helsinki	Gymnastics	Women's floor exercise
Silver	Maria Gorokhovskaya	1952 Helsinki	Gymnastics	Women's uneven bars
Silver	Maria Gorokhovskaya	1952 Helsinki	Gymnastics	Women's vault
Silver	Soviet team	1952 Helsinki	Gymnastics	Women's portable apparatus (2 out of 8)
Silver	Viktor Chukarin	1952 Helsinki	Gymnastics	Men's parallel bars
Silver	Viktor Chukarin	1952 Helsinki	Gymnastics	Men's rings
Silver	Heorhiy Zhylin; Ihor Yemchuk	1952 Helsinki	Rowing	Men's double sculls
Bronze	Dmytro Leonkin	1952 Helsinki	Gymnastics	Men's rings
Gold	Larisa Latynina	1956 Melbourne	Gymnastics	Women's floor exercise
Gold	Larisa Latynina	1956 Melbourne	Gymnastics	Women's vault
Gold	Larisa Latynina	1956 Melbourne	Gymnastics	Women's all around (ind.)
Gold	Soviet team	1956 Melbourne	Gymnastics	Women's all around (2 out of 6) (Note: including Polina Astakhova)
Gold	Viktor Chukarin	1956 Melbourne	Gymnastics	Men's parallel bars
Gold	Viktor Chukarin	1956 Melbourne	Gymnastics	Men's all around (ind.)
Gold	Boris Shakhlin	1956 Melbourne	Gymnastics	Men's pommel horse
Gold	Soviet team	1956 Melbourne	Gymnastics	Men's all around (3 out of 6)
Gold	Soviet team	1956 Melbourne	Modern pentathlon	Men's all around (1 out of 3) (Note: including Ivan Deriuhin)
Gold	Vitali Romanenko	1956 Melbourne	Shooting	Men's running deer
Gold	Ihor Rybak	1956 Melbourne	Weightlifting	Men's lightweight
Silver	Larisa Latynina	1956 Melbourne	Gymnastics	Women's uneven bars
Silver	Viktor Chukarin	1956 Melbourne	Gymnastics	Men's floor exercise
Silver	Yuri Titov	1956 Melbourne	Gymnastics	Men's horizontal bar
Silver	Soviet team	1956 Melbourne	Athletics	Men's relay (1 out of 4) (Note: including Leonid Bartenev)
Bronze	Soviet team	1956 Melbourne	Gymnastics	Women's portable apparatus (2 out of 6) (Note: including Polina Astakhova)
Bronze	Viktor Chukarin	1956 Melbourne	Gymnastics	Men's pommel horse
Bronze	Yuri Titov	1956 Melbourne	Gymnastics	Men's all around (ind.)
Bronze	Yuri Titov	1956 Melbourne	Gymnastics	Men's all vault
Bronze	Soviet Union	1956 Melbourne	Rowing	Men's coxed pair (2 out of 3) (Note: including Heorhiy Zhylin and Ihor Yemchuk)
Bronze	Nadezhda Konyayeva	1956 Melbourne	Athletics	Women's javelin throw
Bronze	Soviet Union	1956 Melbourne	Fencing	Men's team sabre (1 out of 5) (Note: including Yevhen Cherepovsky)
Bronze	Mikhail Shakhov	1956 Melbourne	Wrestling	Men's freestyle (bantamweight)
Gold	Larisa Latynina	1960 Rome	Gymnastics	Women's all around (ind.)
Gold	Larisa Latynina	1960 Rome	Gymnastics	Women's floor exercise
Gold	Polina Astakhova	1960 Rome	Gymnastics	Women's uneven bars
Gold	Margarita Nikolaeva	1960 Rome	Gymnastics	Women's vault
Gold	Soviet Union	1960 Rome	Gymnastics	Women's all around (3 out of 6)
Gold	Boris Shakhlin	1960 Rome	Gymnastics	Men's all around (ind.)
Gold	Boris Shakhlin	1960 Rome	Gymnastics	Men's parallel bars
Gold	Boris Shakhlin	1960 Rome	Gymnastics	Men's pommel horse
Gold	Boris Shakhlin	1960 Rome	Gymnastics	Men's vault
Gold	Vera Krepkina	1960 Rome	Athletics	Women's long jump
Gold	Lyudmila Shevtsova	1960 Rome	Athletics	Women's 800 metres
Gold	Volodymyr Holubnychy	1960 Rome	Athletics	Men's 20 km walk
Gold	Ivan Bohdan	1960 Rome	Wrestling	Men's Greco-Roman (heavyweight)
Silver	Larisa Latynina	1960 Rome	Gymnastics	Women's balance beam
Silver	Larisa Latynina	1960 Rome	Gymnastics	Women's uneven bars
Silver	Polina Astakhova	1960 Rome	Gymnastics	Women's floor exercise
Silver	Boris Shakhlin	1960 Rome	Gymnastics	Men's rings
Silver	Yuri Titov	1960 Rome	Gymnastics	Men's floor exercise
Silver	Soviet Union	1960 Rome	Gymnastics	Men's all around (2 out of 6)
Silver	Valeriy Brumel	1960 Rome	Athletics	Men's high jump
Silver	Soviet Union	1960 Rome	Athletics	Men's relay (1 out of 4) (Note: including Leonid Bartenev)
Silver	Vladimir Synyavsky	1960 Rome	Wrestling	Men's freestyle (lightweight)
Silver	Soviet Union	1960 Rome	Basketball	Men's (1 out of 12) (Note: including Albert Valtin)
Bronze	Larisa Latynina	1960 Rome	Gymnastics	Women's vault
Bronze	Polina Astakhova	1960 Rome	Gymnastics	Women's all around (ind.)
Bronze	Yuri Titov	1960 Rome	Gymnastics	Men's all around (ind.)
Bronze	Boris Shakhlin	1960 Rome	Gymnastics	Men's horizontal bar
Bronze	Igor Ter-Ovanesyan	1960 Rome	Athletics	Men's long jump
Bronze	Soviet Union	1960 Rome	Cycling	Men's track (pursuit, 1 out of 4) (Note: including Leonid Kolumbet)
Gold	Larisa Latynina	1964 Tokyo	Gymnastics	Women's floor exercise
Gold	Polina Astakhova	1964 Tokyo	Gymnastics	Women's uneven bars
Gold	Soviet Union	1964 Tokyo	Gymnastics	Women's all around (2 out of 6)
Gold	Boris Shakhlin	1964 Tokyo	Gymnastics	Men's horizontal bar
Gold	Soviet Union	1964 Tokyo	Volleyball	Men's (3 out of 12) (Note: including Yury Vengerovsky, Eduard Sibiryakov, and Yuriy Poyarkov)
Gold	Leonid Zhabotinsky	1964 Tokyo	Weightlifting	Men's heavyweight
Gold	Grigory Kriss	1964 Tokyo	Fencing	Men's épée (ind.)
Gold	Galina Prozumenshchikova	1964 Tokyo	Swimming	Women's breaststroke
Gold	Soviet Union	1964 Tokyo	Canoeing	Men's C-2 (1 out of 2) (Note: including Andrei Khimich)
Gold	Soviet Union	1964 Tokyo	Canoeing	Men's K-4 (1 out of 4) (Note: including Nikolai Chuzhikov)
Silver	Larisa Latynina	1964 Tokyo	Gymnastics	Women's vault
Silver	Larisa Latynina	1964 Tokyo	Gymnastics	Women's all around (ind.)
Silver	Polina Astakhova	1964 Tokyo	Gymnastics	Women's floor exercise
Silver	Boris Shakhlin	1964 Tokyo	Gymnastics	Men's all around (ind.)
Silver	Yuri Titov	1964 Tokyo	Gymnastics	Men's horizontal bar
Silver	Soviet Union	1964 Tokyo	Gymnastics	Men's all around (2 out of 6)
Silver	Soviet Union	1964 Tokyo	Volleyball	Women's (2 out of 12) (Note: including Lyudmila Gureyeva and Valentina Mishak)
Silver	Soviet Union	1964 Tokyo	Basketball	Men's (1 out of 12) (Note: including Mykola Bahley)
Silver	Georgy Prokopenko	1964 Tokyo	Swimming	Men's breaststroke
Silver	Vladlen Trostyansky	1964 Tokyo	Wrestling	Men's Greco-Roman (bantamweight)
Bronze	Larisa Latynina	1964 Tokyo	Gymnastics	Women's balance beam
Bronze	Polina Astakhova	1964 Tokyo	Gymnastics	Women's all around (ind.)
Bronze	Boris Shakhlin	1964 Tokyo	Gymnastics	Men's rings
Bronze	Ivan Belyayev	1964 Tokyo	Athletics	Men's steeplechase
Bronze	Volodymyr Holubnychy	1964 Tokyo	Athletics	Men's walk (20 km)
Bronze	Soviet Union	1964 Tokyo	Swimming	Men's medley relay (1 out of 4) (Note: including Tatyana Devyatova)
Gold	Volodymyr Holubnychy	1968 Mexico City	Athletics	Men's walk (20 km)
Gold	Soviet Union	1968 Mexico City	Volleyball	Men's (7 out of 12) (Note: including Yuri Poyarkov, Volodymyr Byelyayev, Yevgeni Lapinsky, Vladimir Ivanov, Boris Tereshchuk, Viktor Mikhalchuk, and Vasilius Matushevas)
Gold	Leonid Zhabotinsky	1968 Mexico City	Weightlifting	Men's heavyweight
Gold	Boris Gurevich	1968 Mexico City	Wrestling	Men's freestyle (87 kg)
Gold	Valentin Mankin	1968 Mexico City	Sailing	Men's Finn
Gold	Soviet Union	1968 Mexico City	Fencing	Men's team sabre (1 out of 5) (Note: including Viktor Sidyak)
Gold	Aleksandr Shaparenko; Vladimir Morozov	1968 Mexico City	Canoeing	Men's C-2
Silver	Grigory Kriss	1968 Mexico City	Fencing	Men's épée
Silver	Soviet Union	1968 Mexico City	Fencing	Men's team épée (2 out of 5) (Note: including Grigory Kriss and Iosif Vitebsky)
Silver	Soviet Union	1968 Mexico City	Fencing	Men's team foil (2 out of 5) (Note: including Vasili Stankovich and Viktor Putyatin)
Silver	Soviet Union	1968 Mexico City	Modern pentathlon	Men's (2 out of 3) (Note: including Pavel Lednev and Boris Onishchenko)
Silver	Vladimir Belyaev	1968 Mexico City	Weightlifting	Men's light heavyweight
Silver	Aleksandr Shaparenko	1968 Mexico City	Canoeing	Men's K-1
Silver	Soviet Union	1968 Mexico City	Water polo	Men's (1 out of 11) (Note: including Aleksei Barkalov)
Bronze	Pavel Lednev	1968 Mexico City	Modern pentathlon	Men's (ind.)
Bronze	Soviet Union	1968 Mexico City	Basketball	Men's (1 out of 12) (Note: including Anatoli Polivoda)
Bronze	Valentina Kozyr	1968 Mexico City	Athletics	Women's high jump
Bronze	Soviet Union	1968 Mexico City	Swimming	Men's medley relay (2 out of 4) (Note: including Yuriy Hromak and Vladimir Nemshilov)
Bronze	Vladimir Musalimov	1968 Mexico City	Boxing	Men's welterweight
Bronze	Soviet Union	1968 Mexico City	Rowing	Men's eights (2 out of 9) (Note: including Valentyn Kravchuk and Volodymyr Sterlik)
Gold	Valeriy Borzov	1972 Munich	Athletics	Men's sprint (100 metres)
Gold	Valeriy Borzov	1972 Munich	Athletics	Men's sprint (200 metres)
Gold	Mykola Avilov	1972 Munich	Athletics	Men's decathlon
Gold	Anatoliy Bondarchuk	1972 Munich	Athletics	Men's hammer throw
Gold	Valentin Mankin; Vitali Dyrdyra	1972 Munich	Sailing	Men's Tempest
Gold	Aleksandr Shaparenko	1972 Munich	Canoeing	Men's sprint (K-1)
Gold	Soviet Union	1972 Munich	Canoeing	Men's spring (K-4) (3 out of 4) (Note: including Yuri Filatov, Yuri Stetsenko, and Volodymyr Morozov)
Gold	Soviet Union	1972 Munich	Water polo	Men's (1 out of 11) (Note: including Aleksei Barkalov)
Gold	Yakiv Zheleznyak	1972 Munich	Shooting	Men's running target
Gold	Soviet Union	1972 Munich	Basketball	Men's (2 out of 12) (Note: including Sergei Kovalenko and Anatoli Polivoda)
Gold	Soviet Union	1972 Munich	Canoeing	Women's sprint (K-2, 1 out of 2) (Note: including Yekaterina Kuryshko)
Gold	Yulia Ryabchinskaya	1972 Munich	Canoeing	Women's sprint (K-1)
Gold	Soviet Union	1972 Munich	Modern pentathlon	Men's (2 out of 3) (Note: including Pavel Lednev and Boris Onischenko)
Gold	Vladimir Semenets; Igor Tselovalnykov	1972 Munich	Cycling	Men's track (tandem)
Silver	Yevhen Arzhanov	1972 Munich	Athletics	Men's track (800 metres)
Silver	Soviet Union	1972 Munich	Athletics	Men's relay (4×100 metres, 1 out of 4) (Note: including Valeriy Borzov)
Silver	Volodymyr Holubnychy	1972 Munich	Athletics	Men's 20 kilometres walk
Silver	Leonid Lytvynenko	1972 Munich	Athletics	Men's decathlon
Silver	Soviet Union	1972 Munich	Fencing	Men's foil (2 out of 5) (Note: including Vasyl Stankovych and Victor Putyatin)
Silver	Boris Onischenko	1972 Munich	Modern pentathlon	Men's
Silver	Boris Melnik	1972 Munich	Shooting	Men's free rifle three positions
Bronze	Soviet Union	1972 Munich	Football	Men's (7 out of 19) (Note: including Oleh Blokhin, Yuri Eliseev, Viktor Kolotov, Vladimir Onishchenko, Yevhen Rudakov, Vyacheslav Semyonov, and Anatoli Kuksov)
Bronze	Soviet Union	1972 Munich	Fencing	Men's épée (2 out of 5) (Note: including Grigori Kriss and Sergei Paramonov)
Bronze	Soviet Union	1972 Munich	Volleyball	Men's (2 out of 12) (Note: including Yuriy Poyarkov and Yevhen Lapinsky)
Bronze	Pavel Lednev	1972 Munich	Modern pentathlon	Men's
Bronze	Anatoliy Novikov	1972 Munich	Judo	Men's half middleweight

=== Winter Olympics ===
Medal	Name	Games	Sport	Event
Gold	Ivan Biakov	1976 Innsbruck	Biathlon	Men's relay
Silver	Alexander Batyuk	1984 Sarajevo	Cross-country skiing	Men's relay
Bronze	Viktor Petrenko	1988 Calgary	Figure skating	Men's singles
Gold	Viktor Petrenko	1992 Albertville	Figure skating	Men's singles
Gold	Alexei Zhitnik	1992 Albertville	Ice hockey	Men's tournament

=== The most prominent ===
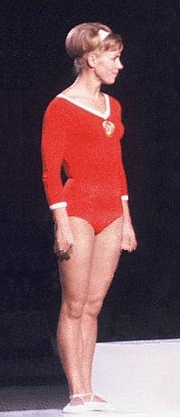
Latynina during the vault award ceremony at the 1964 Olympics

The most prominent
Olympian	1st place, gold medalist(s)	2nd place, silver medalist(s)	3rd place, bronze medalist(s)	Total
Larisa Latynina (gymnastics)	9	5	3	17
Boris Shakhlin (gymnastics)	7	4	2	13
Viktor Chukarin (gymnastics)	7	3	1	11
Polina Astakhova (gymnastics)	5	2	3	10
Maria Gorokhovskaya (gymnastics)	2	5	0	7
Nina Bocharova (gymnastics)	2	2	0	4
Volodymyr Holubnychy (athletics)	2	1	1	4
Aleksandr Shaparenko (canoeing)	2	1	0	3
Valeriy Borzov (athletics)	2	1	0	3
Yuri Poyarkov (volleyball)	2	0	1	3
Margarita Nikolaeva (gymnastics)	2	0	0	2
Leonid Zhabotinsky (weightlifting)	2	0	0	2

== See also ==
- Category:Olympic competitors for Ukraine
- List of Olympic champions of Ukraine
- Ukraine at the Paralympics
- Ukraine at the Youth Olympics
- Ukraine at the European Games
