= Danyil Odynets =

Ukrainian triathlete (born 2004)

Danyil Odynets (Ukrainian: Даниїл Одинець; born 2004) is a Ukrainian professional triathlete competing under Austrian residence. He is the 2025 U24 Ironman World Champion.

== Early life and career ==
Odynets was born in Kyiv, Ukraine. He began running at age 13 and took up swimming at age 16. He developed his competitive triathlon career in his home city before the 2022 Russian invasion of Ukraine forced him to relocate.

Following the invasion, Odynets moved to Austria where he rebuilt his training infrastructure while maintaining competitive development. Access to alpine training routes and professional coaching support in Austria proved crucial to his progression in the sport.

== Major results ==
=== 2025 ===
==== Ironman U24 European Championships ====
On 28 June 2025, Odynets finished third overall at Ironman Frankfurt with a time of 8:34, simultaneously winning the M18-24 European Championship title. The race took place in extreme heat conditions that caused his bike nutrition bag to deform and his bottle cage elastic to melt.

==== Ironman U24 World Championships ====
On 14 September 2025, Odynets won the U24 category at the Ironman World Championship in Nice, France. He finished with a total time of 9:09:42, consisting of a 59:02 swim, 5:15:41 bike split (fourth fastest in his division), and 2:49:02 marathon (fastest in the U24 category).

The decisive moment came in the final 1.6 kilometers of the marathon when Odynets executed a sustained surge to break away from the race leader. He maintained negative splits throughout the marathon, running the second half faster than the first. His victory margin was 39 seconds over second place.

The championship represented the highest-level international victory achieved by a Ukrainian triathlete since the beginning of the 2022 conflict.

== Career progression ==
As of September 2025, Odynets held a personal best time of 8 hours 34 minutes for the Ironman distance. He has stated goals of achieving a sub-8:30 finish time and has announced plans to transition to professional competition in 2026.
