= Handball at the 2004 Summer Olympics =

Tournament details
- Host country: Greece
- Venues: 2 (in 1 host city)
- Dates: 14–29 August 2004
- Teams: 22 (from 4 confederations)

Final positions
- Champions: Croatia (Men); Denmark (Women)
- Runners-up: Germany (Men); South Korea (Women)
- Third place: Russia (Men); Ukraine (Women)
- Fourth place: Hungary (Men); France (Women)

Handball at the 2004 Summer Olympics included a men's and a women's team competitions with the preliminary rounds taking place in the Sports Pavilion at the Faliro Coastal Zone Olympic Complex. From the quarter final stage onwards, the women's event moved to the Helliniko Olympic Indoor Arena, a part of the Helliniko Olympic Complex, with the men joining them there for their semi-finals and final.

The men's Handball event first made an appearance, played outside, at the 1936 Summer Olympics in Berlin, Germany but did not then re-appear until the Games returned to Germany for the Munich Olympics in 1972 since when it has been ever present. The women's game debuted in Montreal, Quebec, Canada at the 1976 Summer Olympics and again has been ever present since.

== Medal summary ==
Event	Gold	Silver	Bronze
Men	Croatia Ivano Balić; Davor Dominiković; Mirza Džomba; Slavko Goluža; Nikša Kaleb; Blaženko Lacković; Venio Losert; Valter Matošević; Petar Metličić; Vlado Šola; Denis Špoljarić; Goran Šprem; Igor Vori; Drago Vuković; Vedran Zrnić	Germany Markus Baur; Frank von Behren; Mark Dragunski; Henning Fritz; Pascal Hens; Jan Olaf Immel; Torsten Jansen; Florian Kehrmann; Stefan Kretzschmar; Klaus-Dieter Petersen; Christian Ramota; Christian Schwarzer; Daniel Stephan; Christian Zeitz; Volker Zerbe	Russia Pavel Bashkin; Mikhail Chipurin; Aleksandr Gorbatikov; Vyacheslav Gorpishin; Vitali Ivanov; Eduard Koksharov; Alexey Kostygov; Denis Krivoshlykov; Vasily Kudinov; Oleg Kuleshov; Andrey Lavrov; Sergey Pogorelov; Alexey Rastvortsev; Dmitri Torgovanov; Aleksandr Tuchkin
Women	Denmark Louise Bager Nørgaard; Rikke Skov; Henriette Rønde Mikkelsen; Mette Vestergaard; Rikke Hørlykke Jørgensen; Camilla Ingemann Thomsen; Karin Ørnhøj Mortensen; Lotte Kiærskou; Trine Jensen; Katrine Fruelund; Rikke Schmidt; Kristine Andersen; Karen Brødsgaard; Line Daugaard; Josephine Touray	South Korea Oh Yong-Ran; Woo Sun-Hee; Huh Soon-Young; Lee Gong-Joo; Jang So-Hee; Kim Hyun-Ok; Kim Cha-Youn; Oh Seong-Ok; Huh Young-Sook; Moon Kyeong-Ha; Lim O-Kyeong; Lee Sang-Eun; Myoung Bok-Hee; Choi Im-jeong; Moon Pil-Hee	Ukraine Nataliya Borysenko; Ganna Burmystrova; Tetyana Shynkarenko; Maryna Vergelyuk; Olena Yatsenko; Ganna Siukalo; Olena Radchenko; Olena Tsyhytsia; Galyna Markushevska; Lyudmyla Shevchenko; Iryna Honcharova; Nataliya Lyapina; Anastasiia Borodina; Larysa Zaspa; Oxana Rayhel

== Medal table ==
Rank	Nation	Gold	Silver	Bronze	Total
1	Croatia	1	0	0	1
1	Denmark	1	0	0	1
3	Germany	0	1	0	1
3	South Korea	0	1	0	1
5	Russia	0	0	1	1
5	Ukraine	0	0	1	1
Totals (6 entries)		2	2	2	6

== Teams ==
=== Men ===
The men's event involved twelve teams split equally into two groups.

Group A:

- Croatia
- South Korea
- Iceland
- Russia
- Slovenia
- Spain

Group B:

- Brazil
- Egypt
- France
- Germany
- Greece
- Hungary

=== Women ===
The women's event involved ten teams split in two groups.

Group A:

- Brazil
- China
- Greece
- Hungary
- Ukraine

Group B:

- Angola
- Denmark
- France
- South Korea
- Spain

When all teams within a group have played each other in both men's and women's competitions the top four from each group will progress into their respective quarter finals.
