= Leonid Ratner =

Ukrainian handball coach

Personal information
- Born: 26 December 1937 (age 88) Kremenchuk, Ukraine SSR

Sport
- Sport: Handball

Teams managed
- Years: Team
- 1996-2004: Ukraine
- 2011-2015: Ukraine
Medal record
Olympic Games
Bronze medal – third place	2004 Athens	Coach
European Championship
Gold medal – first place	2000 Romania

Leonid Anatolyevich Ratner (Ukrainian: Леонід Анатолійович Ратнер; born 26 December 1937) is a Ukrainian handball coach who has been the head coach for the Ukrainian women's national team over two periods from 1996 to 2004 and from 2011 to 2015.

In 2000 he won silver medals with Ukraine at the 2000 European Championship, losing to Hungary in extra time. This is Ukraine's best result to date. In 2004 he coached the team to a bronze medal at the 2004 Olympics, losing to Denmark in the semifinal and beating France in the third place playoff.

He was known for having load outburst, shouting at his players during matches, and in some instances even dismissing them during matches.
