= Grigoria Golia =

Greek handball player (born 1974)

Grigoria Golia (born 22 March 1974) is a Greek handball player who competed in the 2004 Summer Olympics.
