= Iryna Honcharova =

Ukrainian handball player

Personal information
- Full name: Iryna Honcharova
- Nationality: Ukrainian
- Born: August 19, 1979 (age 47) Zaporizhzhia, Ukrainian SSR, Soviet Union

Sport
- Sport: Handball
- Position: Goalkeeper
- Current club: Retired

Senior clubs
- Years: Team
- –2002: HC Motor Zaporizhzhia
- 2002–2007: Kometal Gjorče Petrov Skopje
National team
- Years: Team
- 1999–2005: Ukraine
Medal record
Women's handball
Olympic Games
Bronze medal – third place	2004 Athens	Team Competition
European Championship
Silver medal – second place	2000 Romania	Team competition

Iryna Honcharova (born 19 December 1974) is a Ukrainian team handball goalkeeper. She received a bronze medal with the Ukrainian national team at the 2004 Summer Olympics in Athens.
