= Ganna Siukalo =

Ukrainian handball player

Personal information
- Full name: Ganna Oleksandrivna Siukalo
- Nationality: Ukrainian
- Born: September 12, 1976 (age 50) Kyiv, Ukrainian SSR, Soviet Union
- Height: 1.75 m (5 ft 9 in)
- Weight: 61 kg (134 lb)

Sport
- Sport: Handball
- Position: Centre back / Playmaker
- Current club: Retired

Senior clubs
- Years: Team
- –2003: Spartak Kyiv
- 2003–2004: Váci NKSE
- 2004–2006: RK Krim Ljubljana
National team
- Years: Team
- –: Ukraine
Medal record
Representing Ukraine
Women's handball
Olympic Games
Bronze medal – third place	2004 Athens	Team
European Championship
Silver medal – second place	2000 Romania	Team

Ganna Siukalo (born 12 September 1976) is a Ukrainian team handball player. She received a bronze medal with the Ukrainian national team at the 2004 Summer Olympics in Athens.
