= Lyudmyla Shevchenko =

Ukrainian/Russian handball player (born 1970)

Medal record

Representing Ukraine

Women's handball

Olympic Games
Bronze medal – third place	2004 Athens	Team Competition

Lyudmyla Shevchenko (Russian: Людмила Дмитриевна Шевченко, Ukrainian: Людмила Дмитрівна Шевченко) (born 4 February 1970) is a former Ukrainian/Russian team handball player, who represented both the Russia women's national handball team and later the Ukraine women's national handball team. She received a bronze medal with the Ukrainian national team at the 2004 Summer Olympics in Athens.
