= Tetyana Shynkarenko =

Ukrainian handball player

Personal information
- Full name: Tetyana Volodymyrivna Shynkarenko
- Nationality: Ukrainian
- Born: October 26, 1978 (age 47) Chernivtsi, Ukrainian SSR, Soviet Union
- Height: 1.78 m (5 ft 10 in)

Sport
- Sport: Handball
- Position: Line player
- Current club: Retired

Senior clubs
- Years: Team
- 1996–2002: Motor Zaporizhzhia
- 2002–2004: Hypo Niederösterreich
- 2007–2008: DJK/MJC Trier
- 2008–2009: DVSC-Aquaticum
National team
- Years: Team
- 199?–2004: Ukraine
Medal record
Representing Ukraine
Women's handball
Olympic Games
Bronze medal – third place	2004 Athens	Team Competition
European Junior Championships
Silver medal – second place	1996 Poland	Team

Tetyana Shynkarenko (Ukrainian: Тетяна Шинкаренко; born 26 October 1978) is a Ukrainian team handball player. She received a bronze medal with the Ukrainian national team at the 2004 Summer Olympics in Athens.
