= Oksana Raykhel =

Ukrainian handball player

Personal information
- Full name: Oksana Raykhel
- Nationality: Ukrainian
- Born: March 7, 1977 (age 49) Zaporizhzhia, Ukrainian SSR, Soviet Union

Sport
- Sport: Handball
- Position: left wing
- Current club: Retired

Senior clubs
- Years: Team
- –2002: Spartak Kyiv
- 2002–2004: HC Motor Zaporizhzhia
- 2004–2007: Kometal Gjorče Petrov Skopje
National team
- Years: Team
- 1998–2005: Ukraine
Medal record
Representing Ukraine
Women's handball
Olympic Games
Bronze medal – third place	2004 Athens	Team Competition
European Youth Championships
Gold medal – first place	1994 Lithuania	Team competition

Oxana Rayhel (born 24 February 1977) is a Ukrainian team handball player. She received a bronze medal with the Ukrainian national team at the 2004 Summer Olympics in Athens.
