= Hanna Burmystrova =

Ukrainian handball player (born 1977)

Medal record

Representing Ukraine

Women's handball

Olympic Games
Bronze medal – third place	2004 Athens	Team Competition

Ganna Burmystrova, née Prokopenko (born Ukrainian: Ганна Бурмистрова; 16 June 1977) is a Ukrainian team handball player. She received a bronze medal with the Ukrainian national team at the 2004 Summer Olympics in Athens.
