= Halyna Markushevska =

Ukrainian handball player

Medal record

Representing Ukraine

Women's handball

Olympic Games
| Bronze medal – third place | 2004 Athens | Team |

European Championship
| Silver medal – second place | 2000 Romania | Team |

Galyna Markushevska (born 16 July 1976) is a Ukrainian team handball player. She received a bronze medal with the Ukrainian national team at the 2004 Summer Olympics in Athens.
