= Larysa Zaspa =

Ukrainian handball player

Medal record

Representing Ukraine

Women's handball

Olympic Games
| Bronze medal – third place | 2004 Athens | Team Competition |

Representing Soviet Union

World Junior Championships
| Gold medal – first place | 1991 France | Team |

Larysa Zaspa (born 22 September 1971 in Khmelnytskyi, Ukrainian SSR, Soviet Union) is a Ukrainian team handball goalkeeper. She received a bronze medal as captain for the Ukrainian national team at the 2004 Summer Olympics in Athens.

== Club player ==
Zaspa plays for the Ukrainian club HC Motor Zaporozhye. She received a bronze medal in the Women's EHF Cup in 2005/2006.
