= Olena Yatsenko =

Ukrainian handball player

Personal information
- Full name: Olena Mykolayivna Yatsenko
- Nationality: Ukrainian
- Born: October 4, 1977 (age 49) Kharkiv, Ukrainian SSR, Soviet Union
- Height: 1.68 m (5 ft 6 in)
- Weight: 65 kg (143 lb)

Sport
- Sport: Handball
- Position: Right wing
- Current club: Retired

Senior clubs
- Years: Team
- 1992–2001: Spartak Kyiv
- 2001–2009: RK Krim Ljubljana
- 2009–2010: Arvor 29 Brest
- 2010–2013: Dinamo Volgograd
National team
- Years: Team
- 1994–2007: Ukraine
Medal record
Representing Ukraine
Women's handball
Olympic Games
Bronze medal – third place	2004 Athens	Team
European Championship
Silver medal – second place	2000 Romania	Team
European Youth Championships
Gold medal – first place	1994 Lithuania	Team
European Junior Championships
Silver medal – second place	1996 Poland	Team

Olena Yatsenko (born 4 October 1977) is a Ukrainian team handball player. She received a bronze medal with the Ukrainian national team at the 2004 Summer Olympics in Athens.
