= Angolan Handball Federation =

Governing body of handball in Angola

Angolan Handball Federation Portuguese: Federação Angolana de Andebol FAAND
- IOC nation: Republic of Angola
- Sport: Handball
- Other sports: Beach Handball; Wheelchair Handball
- Official website: web.archive.org/web/20130531023923/http://federacaodeandebol.ao/

HISTORY
- Year of formation: 20 May 1974; 52 years ago

DEMOGRAPHICS
- Membership size: 18

AFFILIATIONS
- International federation: International Handball Federation (IHF)
- IHF member since: 1980
- Continental association: African Handball Confederation
- National Olympic Committee: Angolan Olympic Committee

GOVERNING BODY
- President: Mr. José Amaral Júnior (Angola)

HEADQUARTERS
- Address: Estádio da Cidadela, Luanda
- Country: Angola
- Secretary General: Mr. António Joaquim dos Santos

The Angolan Handball Federation (Federação Angolana de Andebol or simply FAAND) is the governing body of official handball competitions in Angola. FAAND was founded on May 20, 1974, still in the heat of the anti-colonial struggle, when a group of nationalists decided to establish the federation. Every year, the National Handball Day is celebrated on May 20, to mark the day when a handball tournament was organized in Angola for the first time. However, only in 1976 it officially began to operate. Francisco António de Almeida was appointed as chairman. FAB oversees the activities of the 18 provincial handball associations in the country.

On an annual basis, the federation organizes the men's national championship, the women's championship as well as the Angolan Cup and Super Cup, including in the lower age categories. It also oversees the provincial championships organized by the related basketball associations and the participation of national squads in African and worldwide events.

== Africa Palmarès (national squad) ==
Women

Year	Gold	Silver	Bronze	Year	Gold	Silver	Bronze
1989	Angola 1989						
1991		Egypt 1991		1991	All Africa Games Cairo		
1992	Ivory Coast 1992						
1994	Tunisia 1994			1995	All Africa Games Harare		
1996			Benin 1996				
1998	South Africa 1998			1999	All Africa Games Jo'burg		
2000	Algeria 2000						
2002	Morocco 2002			2003			All Africa Games Abuja
2004	Egypt 2004						
2006	Tunisia 2006			2007	All Africa Games Algiers		
2008	Angola 2008						
2010	Egypt 2010			2011	All Africa Games Maputo		
2012	Morocco 2012						
2014			Algeria 2014				
2016	Angola 2016			2015	Afr. Games Brazzaville		
2018	Congo 2018						

Men

Year	Gold	Silver	Bronze	Year	Gold	Silver
2004			Cairo 2004			
2011				2011		All Africa Games Maputo
2015				2015		African Games Brazza

== Participation in world events (Women) ==
Year	World Cup	Ranking	Year	Summer Olympics	Ranking
1990	South Korea 1990	16th (out of 16)			
1993	Norway 1993	16th (out of 16)			
1995	Austria & Hungary 1995	16th (out of 20)			
			1996	Summer Olympics Atlanta	7th (out of 8)
1997	Germany 1997	15th (out of 24)			
1999	Denmark & Norway 1999	15th (out of 24)			
			2000	Summer Olympics Sydney	9th (out of 10)
2001	Italy 2001	13th (out of 24)			
2003	Croatia 2003	17th (out of 24)			
			2004	Summer Olympics Athens	9th (out of 10)
2005	Russia 2005	16th (out of 24)			
2007	France 2007	7th (out of 24)			
			2008	Summer Olympics Beijing	12th (out of 12)
2009	China 2009	11th (out of 24)			
2011	Brazil 2011	8th (out of 24)			
			2012	Summer Olympics London	10th (out of 12)
2013	Serbia 2013	16th (out of 24)			
2015	Denmark 2015	16th (out of 24)			
			2016	Summer Olympics Rio	8th (out of 12)

== National Champions ==
Women

Team	Won	Years won
Petro de Luanda	22	1989, 1990, 1991, 1992, 1993, 1994, 1995, 1996, 1997, 1999, 2000, 2001, 2002, 2003, 2004, 2005, 2006, 2007, 2008, 2009, 2010, 2012
Ferroviário de Luanda	9	1979, 1981, 1982, 1983, 1984, 1985, 1986, 1987, 1988
Primeiro de Agosto	6	2011, 2013, 2014, 2015, 2016, 2017
ASA	1	1998
Educação de Benguela	1	1980

Men

Team	Won	Years won
Primeiro de Agosto	27	1980, 1981, 1982, 1983, 1984, 1986, 1987, 1991, 1992, 1993, 1994, 1995, 1996, 1998, 2000, 2002, 2003, 2004, 2005, 2007, 2008, 2011, 2012, 2013, 2015, 2016, 2017
Petro de Luanda	2	1985, 2014
Kabuscorp	2	2009, 2010
Desportivo da Banca	2	1997, 2006
Sporting de Luanda	2	1999, 2001
Dínamos	1	1990
Interclube	1	1989
Belenenses F.C.	1	1979

== Angola Cup Winners ==
Women

Team	Won	Years won
Petro de Luanda	9	2006, 2007, 2008, 2010, 2011, 2012, 2014, 2016, 2017
Primeiro de Agosto	1	2015

Men

Team	Won	Years won
Primeiro de Agosto	5	2007, 2008, 2013, 2015, 2017
Interclube	5	2010, 2011, 2012, 2014, 2016
Sporting de Luanda	1	2006

== Angola Super Cup Winners ==
Women

Team	Won	Years won
Petro de Luanda	9	2008, 2009, 2010, 2011, 2012, 2013, 2014, 2015, 2017
Primeiro de Agosto	1	2016
ASA	1	2007

Men

Team	Won	Years won
Interclube	5	2011, 2013, 2014, 2015, 2017
Primeiro de Agosto	4	2008, 2009, 2012, 2016
Kabuscorp	1	2010
Desp da Banca	1	2007

== Africa Palmarès (clubs) ==
=== Women ===
Year	Event	Gold	Silver	Bronze
1987	Africa Champions Cup Owerri	Ferroviário		
1988	Africa Champions Cup Cotonou			Petro Atlético
1989	Africa Champions Cup Abidjan			Ferroviário
1991	Africa Champions Cup Kano		Petro Atlético	
1992	Africa Champions Cup Yamoussoukro		Petro Atlético	
1993	Africa Champions Cup Tunis	Petro Atlético		
1994	Africa Champions Cup Cotonou		Petro Atlético	
1995	Africa Champions Cup Cotonou	Petro Atlético		
1996	Africa Champions Cup Cotonou		Petro Atlético	
1997	Africa Champions Cup Niamey	Petro Atlético		
1998	Africa Champions Cup Cotonou	Petro Atlético		
1999	Africa Champions Cup Niamey	Petro Atlético		
2000	Africa Champions Cup Cotonou	Petro Atlético		
2001	Africa Champions Cup Benin City	Petro Atlético		
2002	Africa Champions Cup Libreville	Petro Atlético	ENANA	
2003	Africa Champions Cup Cotonou	Petro Atlético		
2004	Africa Champions Cup Casablanca	Petro Atlético		
2005	Africa Champions Cup Abidjan	Petro Atlético		ASA
2006	Africa Champions Cup Abidjan	Petro Atlético		
2007	Africa Champions Cup Cotonou	Petro Atlético	ASA	
2008	Africa Champions Cup Casablanca	Petro Atlético		
2009	Africa Champions Cup Yaoundé	Petro Atlético	1º de Agosto	
2010	Africa Champions Cup Casablanca	Petro Atlético		
2011	Africa Champions Cup Kaduna	Petro Atlético	1º de Agosto	
2012	Africa Champions Cup Tangier	Petro Atlético	1º de Agosto	
2013	Africa Champions Cup Marrakesh	Petro Atlético	1º de Agosto	Progresso
2014	Africa Champions Cup Tunis	1º de Agosto	Petro Atlético	Progresso
2015	Africa Champions Cup Nador	1º de Agosto	Petro Atlético	
2016	Africa Champions Cup Ouagadougou	1º de Agosto		
2017	Africa Champions Cup Hammamet	1º de Agosto		
2018	Africa Champions Cup Abidjan	1º de Agosto	Petro Atlético	
2019	Africa Champions Cup Praia	1º de Agosto	Petro Atlético	

Year	Event	Gold	Silver
1995	Babacar Fall Brazzaville		Petro Atlético
1996	Babacar Fall Algiers	Petro Atlético	
1997	Babacar Fall Kano		Petro Atlético
1998	Babacar Fall Niamey	Petro Atlético	
1999	Babacar Fall Cotonou	Petro Atlético	
2000	Babacar Fall Cotonou	Petro Atlético	
2001	Babacar Fall Benin City	Petro Atlético	
2002	Babacar Fall Libreville	Petro Atlético	
2003	Babacar Fall Cotonou	Petro Atlético	
2005	Babacar Fall Luanda/Abidjan	Petro Atlético	
2006	Babacar Fall Abidjan/Luanda	Petro Atlético	
2007	Babacar Fall Luanda/Abidjan	Petro Atlético	
2009	Babacar Fall Cotonou	Petro Atlético	
2010	Babacar Fall Ouagadougou	Petro Atlético	
2011	Babacar Fall Yaoundé	Petro Atlético	
2012	Babacar Fall Tunis	Petro Atlético	
2013	Babacar Fall Hammamet	Petro Atlético	
2014	Babacar Fall Oyo	Petro Atlético	
2015	Babacar Fall Libreville	1º de Agosto	Petro Atlético
2016	Babacar Fall Laayoune	1º de Agosto	
2017	Babacar Fall Agadir	1º de Agosto	
2018	Babacar Fall Cairo	1º de Agosto	
2019	Babacar Fall Oudja	1º de Agosto	Petro Atlético

Year	Event	Gold	Silver	Bronze
1996	Cup Winner's Cup Meknes			Electro Lobito
2008	Cup Winner's Cup Meknes	Petro Atlético		
2009	Cup Winner's Cup Cotonou	Petro Atlético		
2010	Cup Winner's Cup Ouagadougou	Petro Atlético		
2011	Cup Winner's Cup Yaoundé	Petro Atlético		
2012	Cup Winner's Cup Tunis	Petro Atlético		
2013	Cup Winner's Cup Hammamet	Petro Atlético		
2014	Cup Winner's Cup Oyo	Petro Atlético		Progresso
2015	Cup Winner's Cup Libreville	1º de Agosto		
2016	Cup Winner's Cup Laayoune	1º de Agosto		Progresso
2017	Cup Winner's Cup Agadir	1º de Agosto		
2018	Cup Winner's Cup Cairo	Petro Atlético	1º de Agosto	
2019	Cup Winner's Cup Oujda	1º de Agosto	Petro Atlético	

=== Men ===
Year	Event	Gold	Silver	Bronze
1986	Africa Champions Cup Libreville			1º de Agosto
1993	Africa Champions Cup Tunis			1º de Agosto
1995	Africa Champions Cup Cotonou			1º de Agosto
2002	Africa Champions Cup Libreville		Sporting	
2005	Africa Champions Cup Abidjan			1º de Agosto
2006	Africa Champions Cup Abidjan		G.D. Banca	
2007	Africa Champions Cup Cotonou	1º de Agosto		
2009	Africa Champions Cup Yaoundé			1º de Agosto
2011	Africa Champions Cup Kaduna			1º de Agosto

Year	Event	Gold
2003	Super Cup Cotonou	1º de Agosto

Year	Event	Silver	Bronze
1995	Cup Winner's Cup Niamey		1º de Agosto
2010	Cup Winner's Cup Ouagadougou	Interclube	

== Chairman history ==
(Angola)	Francisco António de Almeida
(Angola)	Helder Moura
(Angola)	Marcelino Lima
(Angola)	Sardinha de Castro
(Angola)	Juca Figueiredo
(Angola)	José Cardoso de Lima
(Angola)	Hilário de Sousa

== Former head coaches ==
	Ranking (Women)		Years																		
		1981	1983	1985	1987	1989	1991	1992	1994	1996	1998	2000	2002	2004	2006	2008	2010	2012	2014	2016	2018
(Angola)	Norberto Baptista	7	6	5																	
(Angola)	Beto Ferreira (4)				5	1989	1991	1992	1994	1996	1998										
(Angola)	Jerónimo Neto (3)											2000			2006	2008					
(Bulgaria)	Pavel Djenev (2)												2002	2004							
(Portugal)	Paulo Pereira (1)																2010				
(Angola)	Vivaldo Eduardo (1)																	2012	2014		
(Angola)	Filipe Cruz (1)																			2016	
(Denmark)	Morten Soubak (1)																				2018

	Ranking (Men)													P.A.	N.P.	B. Ferreira		Filipe Cruz			
		1981	1983	1985	1987	1989	1991	1992	1994	1996	1998	2000	2002	2004	2006	2008	2010	2012	2014	2016	2018
(Angola)	Ernesto Costa Lara	5																			
	Vesselin Terzinski		10																		
(Angola)	Pina de Almeida												6								
(Bulgaria)	Nicolae Pirgov													2004							
(Angola)	Beto Ferreira														4	4					
(Angola)	Filipe Cruz																5	6	4	2016	2018
				5	5	7					8										

== See also ==
- Angola Women's Handball League
- Angola Men's Handball League
