= Nair Almeida =

Angolan handball player

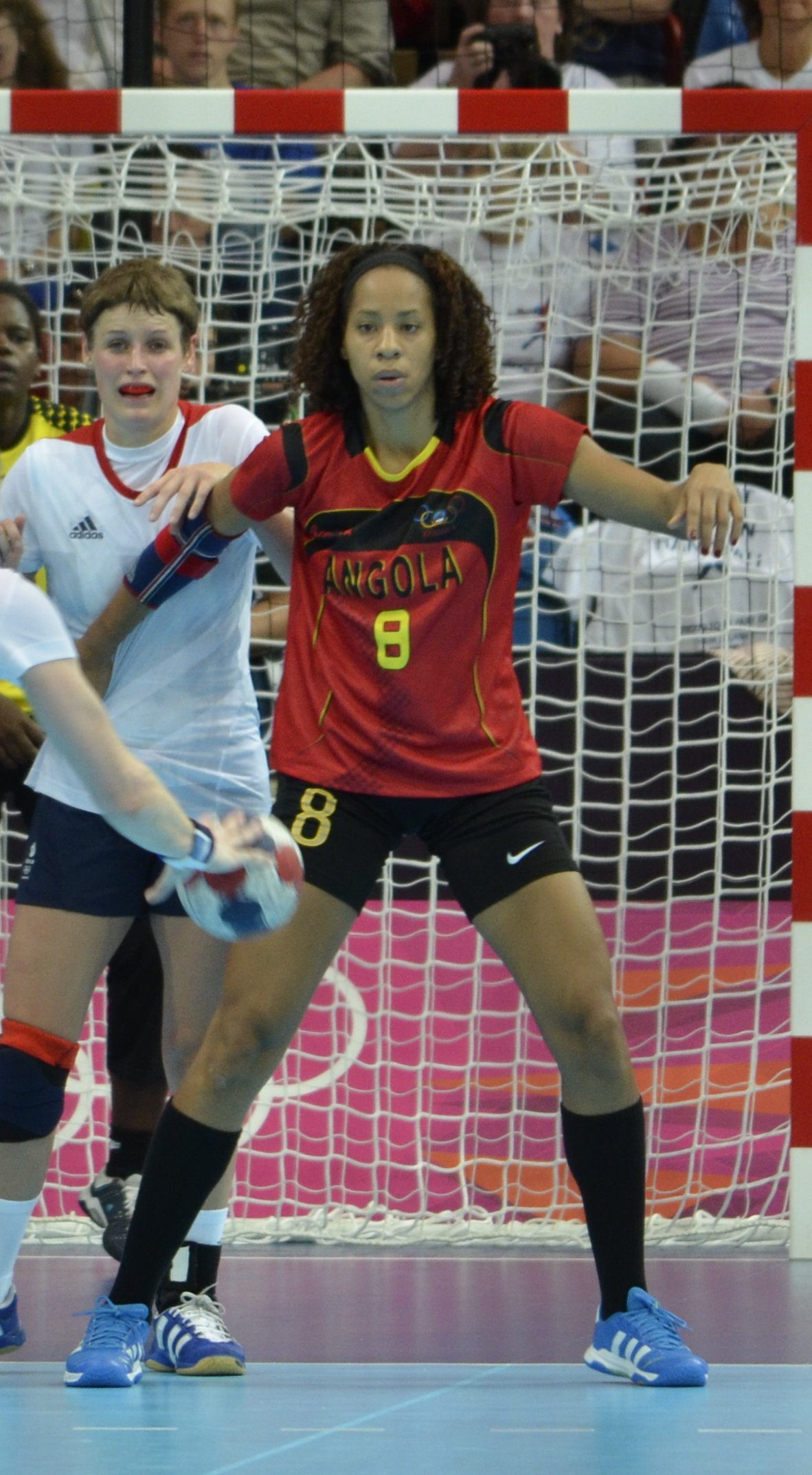

Personal information
- Full name: Nair Filipe Pires de Almeida
- Nationality: Angolan
- Born: January 23, 1984 (age 42) Lobito, Angola
- Height: 1.80 m (5 ft 11 in)

Sport
- Sport: Handball
- Position: Left Back
- Current club: Primeiro de Agosto
- Number: 17

Senior clubs
- Years: Team
- 1998-2002: Escola da Restinga
- 2002–2004: ENANA
- 2004–2011: Petro Atlético
- 2011–2016: Primeiro de Agosto
National team
- Years: Team
- –: Angola
Medal record
African Junior Championship
Gold medal – first place	Yamoussoukro 1998
Gold medal – first place	Tunis 2000
Silver medal – second place	Cotonou 2002
African Championship
Gold medal – first place	Casablanca 2002	Team
Gold medal – first place	Cairo 2004	Team
Gold medal – first place	Tunis 2006	Team
Gold medal – first place	Luanda 2008	Team MVP
Gold medal – first place	Cairo 2010	Team
Gold medal – first place	Salé 2012	Team
All-Africa Games
Gold medal – first place	Maputo 2011	Team
African Champions League
Gold medal – first place	Benin City 2001	Petro Atlético
Gold medal – first place	Abidjan 2005	Petro Atlético
Gold medal – first place	Abidjan 2006	Petro Atlético
Gold medal – first place	Cotonou 2007	Petro Atlético
Gold medal – first place	Casablanca 2008	Petro Atlético
Gold medal – first place	Yaoundé 2009	Petro Atlético
Gold medal – first place	Casablanca 2010	Petro Atlético
Silver medal – second place	Tangier 2012	1º de Agosto
Gold medal – first place	Tunis 2014	1º de Agosto
Gold medal – first place	Nador 2015	1º de Agosto

Nair Filipe Pires de Almeida (born January 23, 1984, in Lobito, Benguela province), is a retired Angolan handball player. Almeida began her career in a small handball team called Escola de Andebol da Restinga, do Lobito (EARL). She competed at the 2004 Summer Olympics in Athens and at the 2005 World Championship. At the 2007 World Championship Angola finished 7th, while Almeida scored 57 goals and was number six on the list of top scorers. She played for Angola at the 2008 Summer Olympics in Beijing and at the 2012 Summer Olympics in London.
