= 2017 Angola Handball Super Cup =

2017 Angola Men's Super Cup
Supertaça de Angola 2017
Interclube	1º de Agosto
Taça Angola	League
24	20
- Date: February 18, 2017
- Venue: Pavilhão da Cidadela, Luanda
- Attendance: 6,000

2017 Angola Women's Super Cup
Supertaça de Angola 2017
Petro Atlético	1º de Agosto
Taça Angola	League
25	24
- Date: February 18, 2017
- Venue: Pavilhão da Cidadela, Luanda
- Attendance: 6,000

The 2017 Angola Handball Super Cup (11th edition) was contested by Primeiro de Agosto, as the 2016 league champion and Interclube, the 2016 cup winner. Interclube won its 5th title.

The 2017 Women's Super Cup (11th edition) was contested by Primeiro de Agosto, the 2016 women's league champion and Petro de Luanda, the 2016 cup winner. Petro Atlético was the winner, making it is's 9th title.

18 Feb 2017; 19:00	Petro Atlético	25–24	1º de Agosto	Cidadela, Luanda
18 Feb 2017; 19:00	Joana Costa 7	(14–10)	Isabel Guialo 6	Cidadela, Luanda
18 Feb 2017; 19:00	4× (suspension)		2× (yellow card) 2× (suspension)	Cidadela, Luanda

Petro Atlético
GK	1	(Angola) Teresa Almeida
GK	22	(Angola) Ivete Simão
CB	2	(Angola) Vilma Nenganga	2 /
LW	3	(Angola) Maura Galheta
LW	6	(Angola) Natália Kamalandua	5 /
RW	8	(Angola) Alexandra Chaca		Suspension
RB	9	(Angola) Manuela Paulino	4 /
P	17	(Angola) Patrícia Barros
RW	20	(Angola) Marta Santos
RB	21	(Angola) Magda Cazanga	5 /	Suspension
RW	24	(Angola) Joana Costa	7 /
P	26	(Angola) Ríssia Oliveira	1 /	Suspension
CB	31	(Angola) Marília Quizelete
LB	35	(Angola) Azenaide Carlos
Coach : (Angola) Vivaldo Eduardo

Stats

Petro Atlético	Statistics	1º de Agosto
25	Goals	24
	Scoring %	
	7m penalty	
8 min	Suspensions	4 min
0	Yellow cards	2
0	Red cards	0
12/39	Saves	11/39
31%	Saving %	28%

1º de Agosto
GK	16	(Angola) Helena Sousa
GK	x	(Angola) Swelly Simão
LW	3	(Angola) Iracelma Silva
RW	4	(Angola) Carolina Morais	2 /
RW	6	(Angola) Juliana Machado	3 /	Booked
LW	7	(Angola) Elizabeth Cailo
RB	8	(Angola) Lurdes Monteiro	1 /
CB	10	(Angola) Teresa Leite
P	11	(Angola) Albertina Kassoma	1 /		Suspension
RW	13	(Angola) Joelma Viegas	2 /
P	15	(Angola) Liliana Venâncio
LB	23	(Democratic Republic of the Congo) Christianne Mwasesa	3 /	Booked	Suspension
RB	90	(Angola) Isabel Guialo	6 /
Coach : (Denmark) Morten Soubak

== See also ==
- 2017 Angola Women's Handball League
- 2017 Supertaça de Angola (football)
- 2017 Supertaça de Angola (basketball)
