= 2018 African Women's Handball Champions League =

Tournament details
- Host country: Ivory Coast
- Venues: 2 (in 1 host city)
- Dates: 19–28 October 2018
- Teams: 9 (from 1 confederation)

Final positions
- Champions: (Angola) 1º de Agosto (5th title)
- Runners-up: (Angola) Petro Atlético
- Third place: (Republic of the Congo) ABO Sport
- Fourth place: (Cameroon) FAP Yaoundé

Tournament statistics
- Matches played: 28

The 2018 African Women's Handball Champions League was the 40th edition, organized by the African Handball Confederation, under the auspices of the International Handball Federation, the handball sport governing body. The tournament was held from October 19–28, 2018 in Abidjan, Ivory Coast, contested by nine teams and won by Clube Desportivo Primeiro de Agosto of Angola.

== Draw ==
Group A	Group B
(Republic of the Congo) ABO Sport (Ivory Coast) Bandama (Cameroon) Dynamique (Democratic Republic of the Congo) HC Héritage (Angola) Petro Atlético	(Ivory Coast) Africa Sports (Cameroon) FAP Yaoundé (Democratic Republic of the Congo) HC Vainqueur (Angola) Primeiro de Agosto

== Preliminary round ==
Times given below are in CET UTC+1.

=== Group A ===
Fri, 19 Oct 2018
Bandama (Ivory Coast)	19 (08:13) 27	(Cameroon) Dynamique
HC Héritage (Democratic Republic of the Congo)	23 (09:13) 25	(Republic of the Congo) ABO Sport
Sat, 20 Oct 2018
Petro Atlético (Angola)	31 (16:11) 22	(Democratic Republic of the Congo) HC Héritage
ABO Sport (Republic of the Congo)	24 (12:13) 21	(Cameroon) Dynamique
Sun, 21 Oct 2018
Dynamique (Cameroon)	16 (09:10) 27	(Angola) Petro Atlético
Bandama (Ivory Coast)	20 (10:09) 21	(Republic of the Congo) ABO Sport
Mon, 22 Oct 2018
HC Héritage (Democratic Republic of the Congo)	21 (11:14) 26	(Cameroon) Dynamique
Petro Atlético (Angola)	29 (15:09) 23	(Ivory Coast) Bandama
Wed, 24 Oct 2018
Bandama (Ivory Coast)	25 (11:11) 26	(Democratic Republic of the Congo) HC Héritage
ABO Sport (Republic of the Congo)	15 (09:14) 29	(Angola) Petro Atlético

Team	Pld	W	D	L	GF	GA	GDIF	Pts
(Angola) Petro Atlético	4	4	0	0	116	76	+40	8
(Republic of the Congo) ABO Sport	4	3	0	1	85	93	−8	6
(Cameroon) Dynamique	4	2	0	2	90	91	−1	4
(Democratic Republic of the Congo) HC Héritage	4	1	0	3	92	107	−15	2
(Ivory Coast) Bandama	4	0	0	4	87	103	−16	0

* Note: Advance to quarter-finals

=== Group B ===
Sat, 20 Oct 2018
1º de Agosto (Angola)	27 (14:08) 16	(Cameroon) FAP Yaoundé
Africa Sports (Ivory Coast)	29 (14:11) 22	(Democratic Republic of the Congo) HC Vainqueur
Mon, 22 Oct 2018
HC Vainqueur (Democratic Republic of the Congo)	12 (05:21) 33	(Angola) 1º de Agosto
FAP Yaoundé (Cameroon)	30 (16:09) 20	(Ivory Coast) Africa Sports
Wed, 24 Oct 2018
1º de Agosto (Angola)	34 (16:07) 16	(Ivory Coast) Africa Sports
FAP Yaoundé (Cameroon)	35 (16:09) 19	(Democratic Republic of the Congo) HC Vainqueur

Team	Pld	W	D	L	GF	GA	GDIF	Pts
(Angola) 1º de Agosto	3	3	0	0	94	44	+50	6
(Cameroon) FAP Yaoundé	3	2	0	1	81	66	+15	4
(Ivory Coast) Africa Sports	3	1	0	2	65	68	−3	2
(Democratic Republic of the Congo) HC Vainqueur	3	0	0	3	53	97	−44	0

* Note: Advance to quarter-finals

== Knockout stage ==
Championship bracket

Quarter-finals
Thu 25 Oct 2018 – 15:00
(Angola) 1º de Agosto	35
(Democratic Republic of the Congo) HC Héritage	17
Thu 25 Oct 2018 – 17:00
(Republic of the Congo) ABO Sport	24
(Ivory Coast) Africa Sports	21
Thu 25 Oct 2018 – 11:00
(Angola) Petro Atlético	33
(Democratic Republic of the Congo) HC Vainqueur	16
Thu 25 Oct 2018 – 13:00
(Cameroon) FAP Yaoundé	28
(Cameroon) Dynamique	25

Semi-finals
Fri 26 Oct 2018 – 18:00
(Angola) 1º de Agosto	22
(Republic of the Congo) ABO Sport	13
Fri 26 Oct 2018 – 15:30
(Angola) Petro Atlético	24
(Cameroon) FAP Yaoundé	16

Final
Sun 28 Oct 2018 – 14:00
(Angola) 1º de Agosto	25
(Angola) Petro Atlético	21
Third place
Sun 28 Oct 2018 – 10:00
(Republic of the Congo) ABO Sport	27
(Cameroon) FAP Yaoundé	22

5-8th bracket

Semifinals
Fri 26 Oct 2018 – 13:00
(Democratic Republic of the Congo) HC Vainqueur	20
(Democratic Republic of the Congo) Dynamique	28
Fri 26 Oct 2018 – 13:00
(Ivory Coast) Africa Sports	24
(Democratic Republic of the Congo) HC Héritage	21

Fifth place
Sat 27 Oct 2018 – 17:00
(Ivory Coast) Africa Sports	24
(Cameroon) Dynamique	23
Seventh place
Sat 27 Oct 2018 – 15:30
(Democratic Republic of the Congo) HC Vainqueur	31
(Democratic Republic of the Congo) HC Héritage	24

=== Quarter-finals ===
Thu, 25 Oct 2018
Petro Atlético (Angola)	33 (15:05) 16	(Democratic Republic of the Congo) HC Vainqueur
1º de Agosto (Angola)	35 (18:10) 17	(Democratic Republic of the Congo) HC Héritage
FAP Yaoundé (Cameroon)	28 (17:09) 25	(Cameroon) Dynamique
ABO Sport (Republic of the Congo)	24 (15:11) 21	(Ivory Coast) Africa Sports

=== 5–8th classification ===
Fri, 26 Oct 2018
HC Vainqueur (Democratic Republic of the Congo)	20 (08:13) 28	(Cameroon) Dynamique
Africa Sports (Ivory Coast)	24 (13:10) 21	(Democratic Republic of the Congo) HC Héritage

=== Semi-finals ===
Fri, 26 Oct 2018
Petro Atlético (Angola)	24 (14:06) 16	(Cameroon) FAP Yaoundé
ABO Sport (Republic of the Congo)	13 (10:11) 22	(Angola) 1º de Agosto

=== 7th place ===
Sat, 27 Oct 2018
HC Héritage (Democratic Republic of the Congo)	24 (–:–) 31	(Democratic Republic of the Congo) HC Vainqueur

=== 5th place ===
Sat, 27 Oct 2018
Africa Sports (Ivory Coast)	24 (–:–) 23	(Cameroon) Dynamique

=== 3rd place ===
Sun, 28 Oct 2018
FAP Yaoundé (Cameroon)	22 (13:14) 27	(Republic of the Congo) ABO Sport

=== Final ===
Sun, 28 Oct 2018
1º de Agosto (Angola)	25 (17:12) 21	(Angola) Petro Atlético

== Final ranking ==
Rank	Team	Record
Gold medal	(Angola) Primeiro de Agosto	6–0
Silver medal	(Angola) Petro Atlético	6–1
Bronze medal	(Republic of the Congo) ABO Sport	5–2
4	(Cameroon) FAP Yaoundé	3–3
5	(Ivory Coast) Africa Sports	3–3
6	(Cameroon) Dynamique	3–4
7	(Democratic Republic of the Congo) HC Vainqueur	1–5
8	(Democratic Republic of the Congo) HC Héritage	1–6
9	(Ivory Coast) Bandama	0–4

2018 Africa Women's Handball Champions Cup winner

5th title

Squad:
Cristina Branco, Helena Sousa, Swelly Simão (GK)
Christianne Mwasesa, Dalva Peres, Juliana Machado, Lurdes Monteiro, Teresa Leite (B)
Carolina Morais, Elizabeth Cailo, Iracelma Silva, Joelma Viegas (W)
Albertina Kassoma, Elizabeth Viegas, Liliana Venâncio (P)
Morten Soubak (Head Coach)

== See also ==
- 2018 African Women's Handball Cup Winners' Cup
- 2018 African Women's Handball Championship
