= 2016 African Women's Handball Champions League =

Tournament details
- Host country: Burkina Faso
- Venues: 3 (in 1 host city)
- Dates: 21–30 October, 2016
- Teams: 9 (from 1 confederation)

Final positions
- Champions: (Angola) 1º de Agosto (3rd title)
- Runners-up: (Republic of the Congo) ASEL
- Third place: (Cameroon) FAP Yaoundé
- Fourth place: (Cameroon) TKC

Tournament statistics
- Matches played: 28
- Goals scored: 1,484 (53 per match)

The 2016 African Women's Handball Champions League was the 38th edition, organized by the African Handball Confederation, under the auspices of the International Handball Federation, the handball sport governing body. The tournament was held from October 21–30, 2015 at the Palais des Sports de Ouagadougou, in Burkina Faso, contested by 9 teams and won by Clube Desportivo Primeiro de Agosto of Angola.

== Draw ==
Group A	Group B
(Benin) ASPAC (Burkina Faso) AS ONEA (Cameroon) FAP Yaoundé (Democratic Republic of the Congo) Mikishi	(Republic of the Congo) ASEL (Ivory Coast) Bandama (Kenya) Nairobi Water (Angola) 1º de Agosto (Cameroon) TKC

== Preliminary round ==
Times given below are in GMT UTC+0.

=== Group A ===
Sat, 22 Oct 2016
FAP Yaoundé (Cameroon)	30 (14:12) 26	(Benin) ASPAC
Mikishi (Democratic Republic of the Congo)	34 (16:09) 25	(Burkina Faso) AS ONEA
Sun, 23 Oct 2016
Mikishi (Democratic Republic of the Congo)	29 (-:-) 26	(Benin) ASPAC
AS ONEA (Burkina Faso)	31 (-:-) 37	(Cameroon) FAP Yaoundé
Tue, 25 Oct 2016
FAP Yaoundé (Cameroon)	29 (-:-) 19	(Democratic Republic of the Congo) Mikishi
ASPAC (Benin)	20 (-:-) 20	(Burkina Faso) AS ONEA

Team	Pld	W	D	L	GF	GA	GDIF	Pts
(Cameroon) FAP Yaoundé	3	3	0	0	96	76	+20	6
(Democratic Republic of the Congo) Mikishi	3	2	0	1	82	70	+12	4
(Benin) ASPAC	3	0	1	2	72	79	-7	1
(Burkina Faso) AS ONEA	3	0	1	2	76	91	-15	1

* Note: Advance to quarter-finals

=== Group B ===
Fri, 21 Oct 2016
Bandama (Ivory Coast)	25 (13:18) 34	(Republic of the Congo) ASEL
TKC (Cameroon)	31 (15:09) 22	(Kenya) Nairobi Water
Sat, 22 Oct 2016
TKC (Cameroon)	22 (15:09) 24	(Republic of the Congo) ASEL
1º de Agosto (Angola)	48 (25:11) 19	(Kenya) Nairobi Water
Sun, 23 Oct 2016
Nairobi Water (Kenya)	26 (-:-) 24	(Ivory Coast) Bandama
1º de Agosto (Angola)	36 (20:07) 19	(Cameroon) TKC
Mon, 24 Oct 2016
Bandama (Ivory Coast)	18 (10:24) 44	(Angola) 1º de Agosto
Nairobi Water (Kenya)	26 (11:25) 38	(Republic of the Congo) ASEL
Tue, 25 Oct 2016
TKC (Cameroon)	32 (-:-) 21	(Ivory Coast) Bandama
ASEL (Republic of the Congo)	19 (-:-) 31	(Angola) 1º de Agosto

Team	Pld	W	D	L	GF	GA	GDIF	Pts
(Angola) 1º de Agosto	4	4	0	0	159	75	+84	8
(Republic of the Congo) ASEL	4	3	0	1	115	104	+11	6
(Cameroon) TKC	4	2	0	2	104	103	+1	4
(Kenya) Nairobi Water	4	1	0	3	93	141	-48	2
(Ivory Coast) Bandama	4	0	0	4	88	136	-48	0

* Note: Advance to quarter-finals
Relegated to 9th place classification

== Knockout stage ==
Championship bracket

Quarter-finals
Thu 27 Oct 2016 – 09:30
(Angola) 1º de Agosto	37
(Burkina Faso) AS ONEA	10
Thu 27 Oct 2016 – 11:15
(Ivory Coast) Mikishi	15
(Cameroon) TKC	24
Thu 27 Oct 2016 – 16:30
(Cameroon) FAP Yaoundé	35
(Kenya) Nairobi Water	15
Thu 27 Oct 2016 – 18:15
(Republic of the Congo) ASEL	45
(Benin) ASPAC	23

Semi-finals
Fri 28 Oct 2016 – 18:30
(Angola) 1º de Agosto	35
(Cameroon) TKC	20
Fri 28 Oct 2016 – 15:00
(Cameroon) FAP Yaoundé	25
(Republic of the Congo) ASEL	26

Final
Sat 29 Oct 2016 – 14:00
(Angola) 1º de Agosto	42
(Republic of the Congo) ASEL	25
Third place
Sat 29 Oct 2016 – 16:30
(Cameroon) FAP Yaoundé	30
(Cameroon) TKC	24

5-8th bracket

Semifinals
Fri 28 Oct 2016 – 08:00
(Kenya) Nairobi Water	32
(Benin) ASPAC	28
Fri 28 Oct 2016 – 11:30
(Democratic Republic of the Congo) Mikishi	26
(Burkina Faso) AS ONEA	25

Fifth place
Sat 29 Oct 2016 – 13:00
(Kenya) Nairobi Water	29
(Democratic Republic of the Congo) Mikishi	28
Seventh place
Sat 29 Oct 2016 – 09:30
(Benin) ASPAC	30
(Burkina Faso) AS ONEA	23

== Final ranking ==
Rank	Team	Record
Gold medal	(Angola) Primeiro de Agosto	7–0
Silver medal	(Republic of the Congo) ASEL	6–1
Bronze medal	(Cameroon) FAP Yaoundé	5–1
4	(Cameroon) TKC	3–4
5	(Kenya) Nairobi Water	3–4
6	(Democratic Republic of the Congo) Mikishi	3–3
7	(Benin) ASPAC	1–3
8	(Burkina Faso) AS ONEA	0–4
9	(Ivory Coast) Bandama	0–4

2016 Africa Women's Handball Champions Cup winner

3rd title

Squad:
Eliane Paulo, Helena Sousa, Swelly Simão (GK)
Christianne Mwasesa, Isabel Guialo, Luísa Kiala, Lurdes Monteiro, Natália Bernardo, Teresa Leite, Wuta Dombaxe (B)
Carolina Morais, Elizabeth Cailo, Iracelma Silva, Joelma Viegas, Juliana Machado (W)
Albertina Kassoma, Elizabeth Viegas, Liliana Venâncio (P)
Filipe Cruz (Head Coach)

== See also ==
- 2016 African Women's Handball Cup Winners' Cup
- 2015 African Women's Handball Championship
