= 2017 African Women's Handball Champions League =

Tournament details
- Host country: Tunisia
- Venues: 3 (in 1 host city)
- Dates: 21–29 October, 2017
- Teams: 8 (from 1 confederation)

Final positions
- Champions: (Angola) 1º de Agosto (4th title)
- Runners-up: (Tunisia) ASF Sfax
- Third place: (Cameroon) FAP Yaoundé
- Fourth place: (Republic of the Congo) ABO Sport

Tournament statistics
- Matches played: 28

The 2017 African Women's Handball Champions League was the 39th edition, organized by the African Handball Confederation, under the auspices of the International Handball Federation, the handball sport governing body. The tournament was held from October 21–29, 2017 at the salle Bein Khiar, in Hammamet, Tunisia, contested by 8 teams and won by Clube Desportivo Primeiro de Agosto of Angola.

== Draw ==
Group A	Group B
(Republic of the Congo) ABO Sport (Ivory Coast) Africa Sports (Cameroon) FAP Yaoundé (Algeria) GS Pétroliers	(Tunisia) ASF Sfax (Ivory Coast) Bandama (Democratic Republic of the Congo) HC Vainqueur (Angola) 1º de Agosto

== Preliminary round ==
Times given below are in CET UTC+1.

=== Group A ===
Sat, 21 Oct 2017
FAP Yaoundé (Cameroon)	27 (17:07) 20	(Algeria) GS Pétroliers
ABO Sport (Republic of the Congo)	39 (24:08) 26	(Ivory Coast) Africa Sports
Tue, 24 Oct 2017
GS Pétroliers (Algeria)	22 (12:09) 35	(Republic of the Congo) ABO Sport
Africa Sports (Ivory Coast)	24 (11:11) 27	(Cameroon) FAP Yaoundé
Wed, 25 Oct 2017
FAP Yaoundé (Cameroon)	22 (09:07) 22	(Republic of the Congo) ABO Sport
Africa Sports (Ivory Coast)	21 (07:11) 23	(Algeria) GS Pétroliers

Team	Pld	W	D	L	GF	GA	GDIF	Pts
(Republic of the Congo) ABO Sport	3	2	1	0	96	70	+26	5
(Cameroon) FAP Yaoundé	3	2	1	0	76	66	+10	5
(Algeria) GS Pétroliers	3	1	0	2	65	83	−18	2
(Ivory Coast) Africa Sports	3	0	0	3	71	89	−18	0

* Note: Advance to quarter-finals

=== Group B ===
Sat, 21 Oct 2017
1º de Agosto (Angola)	27 (14:04) 15	(Democratic Republic of the Congo) HC Vainqueur
Bandama (Ivory Coast)	37 (15:23) 42	(Tunisia) ASF Sfax
Sun, 22 Oct 2017
Bandama (Ivory Coast)	09 (07:16) 28	(Angola) 1º de Agosto
Mon, 23 Oct 2017
ASF Sfax (Tunisia)	20 (13:14) 29	(Angola) 1º de Agosto
Tue, 24 Oct 2017
HC Vainqueur (Democratic Republic of the Congo)	21 (11:16) 29	(Tunisia) ASF Sfax
Wed, 25 Oct 2017
Bandama (Ivory Coast)	22 (09:09) 19	(Democratic Republic of the Congo) HC Vainqueur

Team	Pld	W	D	L	GF	GA	GDIF	Pts
(Angola) 1º de Agosto	3	3	0	0	84	44	+40	6
(Tunisia) ASF Sfax	3	2	0	1	91	87	+4	4
(Ivory Coast) Bandama	3	1	0	2	68	89	−21	2
(Democratic Republic of the Congo) HC Vainqueur	3	0	0	3	70	78	−8	0

* Note: Advance to quarter-finals

== Knockout stage ==
Championship bracket

Quarter-finals
Thu 26 Oct 2017 – 12:00
(Angola) 1º de Agosto	33
(Ivory Coast) Africa Sports	14
Thu 26 Oct 2017 – 14:00
(Cameroon) FAP Yaoundé	33
(Ivory Coast) Bandama	18
Thu 26 Oct 2017 – 18:00
(Tunisia) ASF Sfax	33
(Algeria) GS Pétroliers	18
Thu 26 Oct 2017 – 12:00
(Republic of the Congo) ABO Sport	45
(Democratic Republic of the Congo) HC Vainqueur	23

Semi-finals
Sat 28 Oct 2017 – 14:15
(Angola) 1º de Agosto	23
(Cameroon) FAP Yaoundé	17
Sat 28 Oct 2017 – 12:00
(Tunisia) ASF Sfax	33
(Republic of the Congo) ABO Sport	23

Final
Sat 29 Oct 2016 – 16:00
(Angola) 1º de Agosto	30
(Tunisia) ASF Sfax	17
Third place
Sat 29 Oct 2016 – 12:00
(Cameroon) FAP Yaoundé	31
(Republic of the Congo) ABO Sport	24

5-8th bracket

Semifinals
Sat 28 Oct 2017 – 12:00
(Algeria) GS Pétroliers	26
(Democratic Republic of the Congo) HC Vainqueur	22
Sat 28 Oct 2017 – 18:00
(Ivory Coast) Bandama	22
(Ivory Coast) Africa Sports	19

Fifth place
Sun 29 Oct 2017 – 10:00
(Ivory Coast) Bandama	25
(Algeria) GS Pétroliers	24
Seventh place
Sun 29 Oct 2017 – 09:30
(Ivory Coast) Africa Sports	30
(Democratic Republic of the Congo) HC Vainqueur	23

=== Quarter-finals ===
Thu, 26 Oct 2017
ABO Sport (Republic of the Congo)	31 (16:14) 29	(Democratic Republic of the Congo) HC Vainqueur
1º de Agosto (Angola)	33 (-:-) 14	(Ivory Coast) Africa Sports
FAP Yaoundé (Cameroon)	33 (18:08) 18	(Ivory Coast) Bandama
ASF Sfax (Tunisia)	27 (15:14) 25	(Algeria) GS Pétroliers

=== 5–8th classification ===
Sat, 28 Oct 2017
HC Vainqueur (Democratic Republic of the Congo)	22 (13:14) 26	(Algeria) GS Pétroliers
Bandama (Ivory Coast)	22 (13:07) 19	(Ivory Coast) Africa Sports

=== Semi-finals ===
Sat, 28 Oct 2017
FAP Yaoundé (Cameroon)	17 (06:13) 23	(Angola) 1º de Agosto
ABO Sport (Republic of the Congo)	23 (10:18) 33	(Tunisia) ASF Sfax

=== 7th place ===
Sun, 29 Oct 2017
HC Vainqueur (Democratic Republic of the Congo)	33 (14:17) 28	(Ivory Coast) Africa Sports

=== 5th place ===
Sun, 29 Oct 2017
GS Pétroliers (Algeria)	24 (12:12) 25	(Ivory Coast) Bandama

=== 3rd place ===
Sun, 29 Oct 2017
ABO Sport (Republic of the Congo)	24 (13:11) 31	(Cameroon) FAP Yaoundé

=== Final ===
Sun, 29 Oct 2017
1º de Agosto (Angola)	30 (14:09) 17	(Tunisia) ASF Sfax

== Final ranking ==
Rank	Team	Record
Gold medal	(Angola) Primeiro de Agosto	6–0
Silver medal	(Tunisia) ASF Sfax	4–2
Bronze medal	(Cameroon) FAP Yaoundé	4–1
4	(Republic of the Congo) ABO Sport	3–2
5	(Ivory Coast) Bandama	3–3
6	(Algeria) GS Pétroliers	2–4
7	(Ivory Coast) Africa Sports	1–5
8	(Democratic Republic of the Congo) HC Vainqueur	0–6

2017 Africa Women's Handball Champions Cup winner

4th title

Squad:
Cristina Branco, Eliane Paulo, Helena Sousa, Swelly Simão (GK)
Christianne Mwasesa, Dalva Peres, Isabel Guialo, Juliana Machado, Lurdes Monteiro, Teresa Leite (B)
Carolina Morais, Elizabeth Cailo, Iracelma Silva, Joelma Viegas (W)
Albertina Kassoma, Elizabeth Viegas, Liliana Venâncio (P)
Morten Soubak (Head Coach)

== See also ==
- 2017 African Women's Handball Cup Winners' Cup
- 2016 African Women's Handball Championship
