= C.D. Primeiro de Agosto (handball) =

Angolan handball club

- Full name: Clube Desportivo Primeiro de Agosto
- Short name: Primeiro de Agosto
- Founded: August 1, 1979; 47 years ago
- Arena: Campo do RI 20; Campo do Gama; Pavilhão da Cidadela, Luanda
- Capacity: 1,500
- President: Carlos Hendrick 08/2011 -
- Head coach: Filipe Cruz
- League: 26× Angola League; 4× Angola Cup; 4× Angola Super Cup; 1× Africa Champions Cup; 1× Africa Super Cup
- Club colours
Home	Away

Clube Desportivo Primeiro de Agosto is an Angolan multisports club based in Luanda. The club is attached to the Angolan Armed Forces which is its main sponsor. The club's men's and women's handball teams compete at the local level, at the Luanda Provincial Handball Championship and at the Angolan Men's and Women's leagues as well as at continental level, at the annual African Handball Champions League competitions.

== Primeiro de Agosto Men's Handball ==
=== Honours: Men's Handball ===
- National Championship :
  - Winner (26): 1980, 1981, 1982, 1983, 1984, 1986, 1987, 1991, 1992, 1993, 1994, 1995, 1996, 1998, 2000, 2002, 2003, 2004, 2005, 2007, 2008, 2011, 2012, 2013, 2015, 2016
  - Runner Up (6) : 2001, 2002, 2006, 2009, 2010, 2014
- Angola Cup :
  - Winner (4): 2007, 2008, 2013, 2015
  - Runner Up (5) : 2006, 2010, 2011, 2012, 2016
- Angola Super Cup :
  - Winner (4): 2008, 2009, 2012, 2016
  - Runner Up (2) : 2013, 2014
- CHAB Club Champions Cup :
  - Winner (1): 2007
  - Runner Up (0) :
- CHAB Babacar Fall Super Cup:
  - Winner (1): 2003
  - Runner Up (0) :
- Double

Winners (4): 2006–07, 2007–08, 2012–13, 2014–15

- Triple Crown

Winners (1): 2006–07

=== Squad (Men) ===
Updated as of June 2016

Primeiro de Agosto Men's Handball squad
Goalkeepers

* 16  Gilberto Figueira Uaué 29-197-87
* 20  Giovane Muachissengue 33-185-96 (C)

Wingers

* 03  Elizandro Garcia Kanga 20-173-70
* 08  Otiniel Pascoal 22-R-168-65
* 09  Adilson Maneco 24-L-180-74
* 19  Elsemar Pedro Lito 26-L-169-72

Back players

* 05  Rome Hebo Mário 25-C-188-85
* 06  Manuel Nascimento Manucho 23-180-76
* 07  Feliciano Coveiro 18-R-186
* 10  Áurio Barros
* 14  Cláudio Lopes Elcimar 25-L-170-70
* 17  Sérgio Lopes 34-L-193-112
* 23  José Rolo 34-R-187-93
* 99  Declerck Sibo 23-L-190-87

Line players

* 04  Gabriel Teca 26-183-90
* 11  Augusto Dinzeia Gugu 32-202-116
* 18  Leonel Almeida Leo 180-88

Technical staff

 *     Filipe Cruz – Head Coach
 *     Júlio Caxito – Assistant Coach
 *     Manuel Bunga – Physio
 *     João Chiloia – Stats

=== Players ===
Primeiro de Agosto men's handball players

==== 2011-2017 ====
Nat	#	Name	A	P	H	W	Filipe Cruz					F.S.	Filipe Cruz
Nat	#	Name	A	P	H	W	2011	2012	2013	2014	2015	2016	2017
Nat	#	Name	A	P	H	W	L	L	L	L	L	L	
(Angola)	9	Adilson Maneco	23	W	1.80	74	⋅	⋅	⋅	33	⋅	9	⋅
(Angola)	⋅	Agnelo Quitongo	24	P	1.82		⋅	⋅	⋅	⋅	99	⋅	⋅
(Angola)	⋅	Agostinho Lopes Chano	32	W	1.77	70	⋅	⋅	⋅	?	33	⋅	⋅
(Angola)	⋅	André Cassoma		P			⋅	⋅	⋅	?	injured	⋅	⋅
(Portugal)	⋅	António Campos Tó Zé	36	GK	1.88	118	⋅	⋅	⋅	1	1	⋅	⋅
(Angola)	11	Augusto Dinzeia Gugú	31	P	2.00	116	⋅	⋅	⋅	11	3	11	⋅
(Angola)	10	Aurio Barros		B			⋅	⋅	⋅	⋅	⋅	10	⋅
(Angola)	⋅	Belchior Camuanga Show Baby	32	W	1.70	68	⋅	⋅	⋅	8	8	⋅	⋅
(Angola)	99	Declerck Sibo	22	W	1.90	77	⋅	⋅	⋅	⋅	⋅	99	⋅
(Angola)	14	Cláudio Lopes Elcimar	24	B	1.70	70	⋅	⋅	⋅	?	14	14	⋅
(Angola)	⋅	Edmilson Gonçalves		GK			⋅	⋅	⋅	⋅	12	⋅	⋅
(Angola)	79	Edvaldo Ferreira Moreno	27	B	1.96	90	⋅	⋅	⋅	79	79	–	2017
(Angola)	3	Elizandro Garcia	20	W			⋅	⋅	⋅	⋅	⋅	3	2017
(Angola)	19	Elsemar Pedro Lito	27	W	1.69	72	⋅	⋅	⋅	3	19	19	2017
(Angola)	⋅	Enio Sousa	21	P			⋅	⋅	⋅	?	⋅	⋅	⋅
(Angola)	7	Feliciano Coveiro	18	W			⋅	⋅	⋅	⋅	⋅	⋅	2017
(Angola)	13	Francisco Almeida		B			⋅	⋅	⋅	⋅	⋅	13	⋅
(Angola)	24	Gabriel Teca	25	P	1.90	97	⋅	⋅	⋅	10	24	24	⋅
(Angola)	16	Gilberto Figueira Uaué	28	GK	2.00	87	⋅	⋅	⋅	⋅	⋅	16	⋅
(Angola)	20	Giovane Muachissengue	33	GK	1.85	96	⋅	⋅	⋅	20	20	20	2017
(Angola)	⋅	Joaquim Raúl Manucho		B			⋅	⋅	⋅	6	⋅	⋅	⋅
(Portugal)	23	José Rolo	34	B	1.87	93	⋅	⋅	⋅	19	23	23	2017
(Angola)	⋅	Kaluala José	27	W	1.80	74	⋅	⋅	⋅	7	7	⋅	⋅
(Angola)	18	Leonel de Almeida Leo		P			⋅	⋅	⋅	⋅	⋅	18	⋅
(Angola)	6	Manuel Nascimento Manucho	23	P			⋅	⋅	⋅	?	⋅	→	2017
(Angola)	6	Osvaldo Mulenessa Vadinho	30	W	1.79	80	⋅	⋅	⋅	?	6	6	⋅
(Angola)	8	Otiniel Pascoal	22	W			⋅	⋅	⋅	?	⋅	→	2017
(Angola)	⋅	Panzo Lemba	21	GK	1.86	63	⋅	⋅	⋅	12	⋅	⋅	⋅
(Angola)	5	Romé Hebo Mário	25	B	1.88	85	⋅	⋅	⋅	5	5	5	2017
(Angola)	17	Sérgio Lopes	34	B	1.93	112	⋅	⋅	⋅	→	17	–	2017
(Angola)	⋅	Valdemiro Paulo		B			⋅	⋅	⋅	⋅	10	⋅	⋅

=== Former notable players ===
(Angola)	Paulo Bunze

=== Manager history ===
(Angola)	Pina de Almeida		2003
(Bulgaria)	Nikolai Pirgov	Jan 2003 -	Mar 2007
(Angola)	Filipe Cruz	Mar 2007 -	Dec 2015
(Portugal)	Frederico Santos	Jan 2016 -	Dec 2016
(Angola)	Filipe Cruz	Jan 2017 -

C.D. Primeiro de Agosto
- Full name: Clube Desportivo Primeiro de Agosto
- Short name: Primeiro de Agosto
- Founded: August 1, 1979; 47 years ago
- Arena: Campo do RI 20; Campo do Gama; Pavilhão da Cidadela, Luanda
- Capacity: 1,500
- President: Carlos Hendrick 08/2011 -
- Head coach: Nelson Catito
- League: 6× Angola League; 1× Angola Cup; 1× Angola Super Cup; 5× Africa Champions Cup; 4× Africa Winner's Cup; 5× Africa Super Cup
- Club colours
Home	Away

== Primeiro de Agosto Women's Handball ==
Primeiro de Agosto Women's Handball team is the only African club in all sports to become a World Club Champion. They accomplished this feat by winning the first edition of the IHF Women's Super Globe in 2019.

=== Honours: Women's Handball ===
- Angola Women's League :
  - Winner: 2011, 2013, 2014, 2015, 2016, 2017, 2018, 2019, 2021, 2022, 2023, 2024
  - Runner Up: 2004, 2006, 2009, 2010, 2012
- Angola Cup:
  - Winner: 2015
  - Runner Up: 2010, 2011, 2012, 2013, 2014, 2016, 2017
- Angola Super Cup:
  - Winner: 2016
  - Runner Up: 2011, 2012, 2013, 2014, 2015, 2017, 2018
- African Champions League :
  - Winner: 2014, 2015, 2016, 2017, 2018
  - Runner Up: 2009, 2011, 2012, 2013
- African Cup Winner's Cup :
  - Winner: 2015, 2016, 2017, 2019
  - Runner Up: 2018
- African Super Cup:
  - Winner: 2015, 2016, 2017, 2018, 2019, 2024
- IHF Women's Super Globe:
  - Winner: 2019

=== Squad (Women) ===
Updated as of August 2019

Primeiro de Agosto Women's Handball squad
**Goalkeepers**

* 01  Eneleidys Guevara 33-180-80
* 16  Helena Sousa 25-192-93
* 20  Amália Pinto 22-175-69

**Wingers**

* 02  Mafuta Pedro 21-R-180-68
* 03  Iracelma Silva 28-L-177-67
* 09  Natália Bernardo 33-L-170-65
* 18  Claudete José 22-R-174-71
* 31  Janete Santos 28-L-175-72

**Back players**

* 04  Helena Paulo Gilda 21-C-170-68
* 06  Juliana Machado 25-R-170-65
* 08  Ruth João 21-183-79
* 10  Vilma da Silva 22-R-173-65
* 19  Wuta Dombaxe 33-R-171-69
* 23  Christianne Mwasesa 34-L-175-72
* 88  Vivalda Silva 22-B-178-72

**Line players**

* 15  Liliana Venâncio 24-186

**Technical staff**

 *     Nelson Catito — – Head Coach 
 *     Danilo Júnior 39 – Assistant Coach
 *     Marina Calister 58 – Physio
 *     Etelvina Mateus 43 – Physio

* Players in bold indicate starting lineup

=== Players ===
Primeiro de Agosto women's handball players

C = African champions cup winner

Nat	#	Name	A	P	H	W	P. Pereira		J.F.	V.T.	J.F.	Filipe Cruz	M. Soubak	
Nat	#	Name	A	P	H	W	2011	2012	2013	2014	2015	2016	2017	2018
Nat	#	Name	A	P	H	W	L		L	LC	LC	LC		
(Angola)	11	Albertina Kassoma	21	P	1.90	96	⋅	⋅	⋅	injured	injured	11	11	⋅
(Angola)	4	Carolina Morais Carol	31	W	1.60	64	⋅	⋅	⋅	4	4	4	4	⋅
(Democratic Republic of the Congo)	23	Christianne Mwasesa	32	B	1.75		⋅	⋅	⋅	⋅	23	23	23	⋅
(Angola)	⋅	Cristina Branco Branca	31	GK	1.74	68	⋅	⋅	⋅	12	12	12	injured	⋅
(Angola)	⋅	Dalva Peres	21	B	1.70	68	⋅	⋅	⋅	⋅	24	→	2017	⋅
(Angola)	7	Elizabeth Cailo Jú	30	W	1.75	70	⋅	⋅	⋅	7	7	7	7	⋅
(Angola)	5	Elizabeth Viegas	32	P	1.77	75	⋅	⋅	⋅	⋅	5	5	5	⋅
(Angola)	⋅	Elzira Barros	34	B	1.84	86	⋅	⋅	⋅	21	⋅	⋅	⋅	⋅
(Angola)	⋅	Florinda Caiango Fofó	19	W			⋅	⋅	⋅	3	⋅	⋅	⋅	⋅
(Angola)	16	Helena Sousa	23	GK	1.90	85	⋅	⋅	⋅	⋅	⋅	16	16	⋅
(Angola)	3	Iracelma Silva	26	W	1.74	53	⋅	⋅	⋅	⋅	3	3	3	⋅
(Angola)	⋅	Isabel Eduardo Isa	23	P	1.70	64	⋅	⋅	⋅	18	18	⋅	⋅	⋅
(Angola)	22	Isabel Guialo Belinha	27	B	1.68	65	⋅	⋅	⋅	22	22	22	22	⋅
(Angola)	13	Joelma Viegas Cajó	31	W	1.68	64	⋅	⋅	⋅	13	13	13	13	⋅
(Angola)	6	Juliana Machado	23	W	1.73	56	⋅	⋅	⋅	6	6	6	6	⋅
(Angola)	15	Liliana Venâncio	22	P	1.88		⋅	⋅	⋅	15	15	15	15	⋅
(Democratic Republic of the Congo)	⋅	Louise Makubanza	23	GK	1.80		⋅	⋅	⋅	⋅	30	⋅	⋅	⋅
(Angola)	⋅	Luisa Kiala	34	B	1.74	58	⋅	⋅	⋅	⋅	→	18	18	⋅
(Angola)	⋅	Lurdes Monteiro	31	B	1.68	67	⋅	⋅	⋅	8	8	8	⋅	⋅
(Angola)	⋅	Marta Alberto	20	GK	1.80	75	⋅	⋅	⋅	⋅	20	20	20	⋅
(Angola)	⋅	Nair Almeida	31	B	1.80	64	⋅	⋅	⋅	17	17	⋅	⋅	⋅
(Angola)	⋅	Natália Bernardo	30	B	1.70	57	⋅	⋅	⋅	→	9	9	injured	⋅
(Angola)	⋅	Rossana Quitongo Wandi	25	B	1.74	61	⋅	⋅	⋅	2	2	⋅	⋅	⋅
(Angola)	1	Sílvia Mulabo	27	GK	1.84	61	⋅	⋅	⋅	1	1	1	1	⋅
(Angola)	12	Swelly Simão	20	GK	1.80	63	⋅	⋅	⋅	⋅	⋅	⋅	12	⋅
(Angola)	⋅	Tchesa Pemba	19	B			⋅	⋅	⋅	5	⋅	⋅	⋅	⋅
(Angola)	10	Teresa Leite	22	B	1.77	70	⋅	⋅	⋅	⋅	10	10	10	⋅
(Angola)	⋅	Voneiti Domingos	19	W			⋅	⋅	⋅	10	⋅	⋅	⋅	⋅
(Angola)	19	Wuta Dombaxe	31	B	1.68	68	⋅	⋅	⋅	19	19	19	19	⋅

=== Manager history ===
(Belarus)	Valery Pevnipfky		-
(Angola)	Tony Costa		Apr 2010
(Portugal)	Paulo Pereira	Apr 2010 -	Dec 2012
(Portugal)	João Florêncio	Dec 2012 -	Nov 2013
(Ukraine)	Victor Tchikoulaev	Jan 2014 -	Feb 2015
(Portugal)	João Florêncio Jr	Feb 2015 -	Jan 2016
(Angola)	Filipe Cruz	Feb 2016 -	Dec 2016
(Denmark)	Morten Soubak	Jan 2017 -	Dec 2019
(Angola)	Nelson Catito	Jan 2020 -

== See also ==
- Primeiro de Agosto Football
- Primeiro de Agosto Basketball
- Primeiro de Agosto Volleyball
- Primeiro de Agosto Roller Hockey
- Federação Angolana de Andebol
