= Angolan Football Federation =

Governing body of association football in Angola

CAF
- Founded: 9 August 1979; 46 years ago
- Headquarters: Luanda
- FIFA affiliation: 1980
- CAF affiliation: 1980
- President: Alves Simões
- Website: http://faf.co.ao/

The Angolan Football Federation (Portuguese: Federação Angolana de Futebol; abbreviated as FAF) is the governing body of football in Angola. It was founded in 1979, and affiliated to FIFA and to CAF in 1980. It organizes the national football league Girabola and the national team.

Angola's first appearance in the FIFA World Cup was in 2006; playing in Group D, losing only 1–0 to Portugal in their first match. Later that year, they successfully bid for the right to host the 2010 African Cup of Nations.

== See also ==
- Girabola
- Gira Angola
- Federação Angolana de Basquetebol
- Federação Angolana de Andebol
