= João Florêncio =

Portuguese handball coach

João Florêncio (born 18 November 1954) is a Portuguese handball coach. He is a former coach of the Angolan national team.

He coached them at the 2015 World Women's Handball Championship.
