= 2013 African Women's Handball Champions League =

Tournament details
- Host country: Morocco
- Venue: 1 (in 1 host city)
- Dates: October 3–12
- Teams: 9 (from 1 confederation)

Final positions
- Champions: (Angola) Petro Atlético (19th title)
- Runners-up: (Angola) 1º de Agosto
- Third place: (Angola) Progresso
- Fourth place: (Republic of the Congo) Inter Club

Tournament statistics
- Matches played: 28
- Goals scored: 1,629 (58.18 per match)

The 2013 African Women's Handball Champions League was the 35th edition, organized by the African Handball Confederation, under the auspices of the International Handball Federation, the handball sport governing body. The tournament was held from October 3–12 in Marrakesh, Morocco, contested by 9 teams and won by Atlético Petróleos de Luanda of Angola.

== Draw ==
Group A	Group B
(Ivory Coast) Africa Sports National (Republic of the Congo) Inter Club Brazzaville (Kenya) Nairobi Water (Angola) Petro Atlético (Gabon) Stade Mandji	(Cape Verde) Desportivo ABC (Cameroon) FAP Youndé (Angola) Primeiro de Agosto (Angola) Progresso do Sambizanga

== Preliminary round ==
Times given below are in WET UTC+0.

=== Group A ===
Fri, 4 Oct 2013
Stade Mandji (Gabon)	29 (14:14) 25	(Kenya) Nairobi Water
Petro Atlético (Angola)	35 (16:10) 23	(Ivory Coast) Africa Sports
Sat, 5 Oct 2013
Africa Sports (Ivory Coast)	33 (22:11) 26	(Gabon) Stade Mandji
Inter Club (Republic of the Congo)	26 (13:14) 28	(Angola) Petro Atlético
Sun, 6 Oct 2013
Petro Atlético (Angola)	51 (25:06) 10	(Kenya) Nairobi Water
Inter Club (Republic of the Congo)	40 (18:17) 32	(Ivory Coast) Africa Sports
Mon, 7 Oct 2013
Nairobi Water (Kenya)	15 (07:14) 34	(Ivory Coast) Africa Sports
Stade Mandji (Gabon)	22 (11:20) 30	(Republic of the Congo) Inter Club
Tue, 8 Oct 2013
Petro Atlético (Angola)	30 (15:09) 19	(Gabon) Stade Mandji
Nairobi Water (Kenya)	16 (07:14) 37	(Republic of the Congo) Inter Club

Team	Pld	W	D	L	GF	GA	GDIF	Pts
(Angola) Petro Atlético	4	4	0	0	144	78	+66	8
(Republic of the Congo) Inter Club	4	3	0	1	133	98	+35	6
(Ivory Coast) Africa Sports	4	2	0	2	122	116	+6	4
(Gabon) Stade Mandji	4	1	0	3	96	118	-22	2
(Kenya) Nairobi Water	4	0	0	4	66	151	-85	0

* Note: Advance to quarter-finals

=== Group B ===
Thu, 3 Oct 2013
1º de Agosto (Angola)	48 (20:07) 18	(Cape Verde) ABC
FAP Yaoundé (Cameroon)	29 (11:16) 30	(Angola) Progresso
Sat, 5 Oct 2013
FAP Yaoundé (Cameroon)	41 (23:06) 23	(Cape Verde) ABC
1º de Agosto (Angola)	33 (16:16) 29	(Angola) Progresso
Mon, 7 Oct 2013
1º de Agosto (Angola)	39 (17:15) 27	(Cameroon) FAP Yaoundé
Progresso (Angola)	35 (21:11) 21	(Cape Verde) ABC

Team	Pld	W	D	L	GF	GA	GDIF	Pts
(Angola) 1º de Agosto	3	3	0	0	120	74	+46	6
(Angola) Progresso	3	2	0	1	94	83	+11	4
(Cameroon) FAP Youndé	3	1	0	2	97	92	+5	2
(Cape Verde) Desportivo ABC	3	0	0	3	62	124	-62	0

* Note: Advance to quarter-finals

== Knockout stage ==
Championship bracket

Quarter-finals
Thu 10 Oct 2013 – 17:30
(Angola) Petro Atlético	33
(Cape Verde) Desportivo ABC	14
Thu 10 Oct 2013 – 12:30
(Ivory Coast) Africa Sports	21
(Angola) Progresso	24
Thu 10 Oct 2013 – 12:30
(Angola) 1º de Agosto	42
(Gabon) Stade Mandji	14
Thu 10 Oct 2013 – 15:00
(Cameroon) FAP Yaoundé	50
(Republic of the Congo) Inter Club	51

Semi-finals
Fri 11 Oct 2013 – 14:30
(Angola) Petro Atlético	27
(Angola) Progresso	14
Fri 11 Oct 2013 – 12:00
(Republic of the Congo) Inter Club	29
(Angola) 1º de Agosto	41

Final
Sat 12 Oct 2013 – 12:00
(Angola) Petro Atlético	31
(Angola) 1º de Agosto	27
Third place
Sat 12 Oct 2013 – 13:00
(Angola) Progresso	33
(Republic of the Congo) Inter Club	30

5-8th bracket

Semifinals
Fri 11 Oct 2013 – 12:00
(Cape Verde) Desportivo ABC	21
(Ivory Coast) Africa Sports	30
Fri 11 Oct 2013 – 12:30
(Cameroon) FAP Yaoundé	25
(Gabon) Stade Mandji	24

Fifth place
Sat 12 Oct 2013 – 13:00
(Ivory Coast) Africa Sports	22
(Cameroon) FAP Yaoundé	29
Seventh place
Sat 12 Oct 2013 – 09:00
(Cape Verde) Desportivo ABC	32
(Gabon) Stade Mandji	31

== Final ranking ==
Rank	Team	Record
Gold medal	(Angola) Petro Atlético	7–0
Silver medal	(Angola) Primeiro de Agosto	5–1
Bronze medal	(Angola) Progresso	4–2
4	(Republic of the Congo) Inter Club Brazzaville	4–3
5	(Cameroon) FAP Youndé	3–3
6	(Ivory Coast) Africa Sports National	3–4
7	(Cape Verde) Desportivo ABC	1–5
8	(Gabon) Stade Mandji	1–6
9	(Kenya) Nairobi Water	0–4

2013 Africa Women's Handball Champions Cup Winner

Atlético Petróleos de Luanda
19th title

== See also ==
- 2014 African Women's Handball Championship
