= 2015 African Women's Handball Cup Winners' Cup =

Tournament details
- Host country: Gabon
- Venues: 2 (in 1 host city)
- Dates: May 15–20
- Teams: 10 (from 1 confederation)

Final positions
- Champions: (Angola) 1º de Agosto (1st title)
- Runners-up: (Ivory Coast) Africa Sports
- Third place: (Republic of the Congo) ABO Sport
- Fourth place: (Cameroon) FAP Yaoundé

Tournament statistics
- Matches played: 24
- Goals scored: 1,194 (49.75 per match)

The 2015 African Women's Handball Cup Winners' Cup was the 31st edition, organized by the African Handball Confederation, under the auspices of the International Handball Federation, the handball sport governing body. The tournament was held from May 15–20, 2015 in two venues: the Gymnasium of the Military Academy and the Gymnasium Oloumi, in Libreville, Gabon, contested by 10 teams and won by Clube Desportivo Primeiro de Agosto of Angola thus dethroning longtime reigning champion Petro Atlético which declined to defend its title citing financial reasons.

== Draw ==
Group A	Group B
(Republic of the Congo) ABO Sport (Democratic Republic of the Congo) HC Héritage; Phoenix Gabon (Angola) Progresso (Cameroon) TKC	(Ivory Coast) Africa Sports (Republic of the Congo) Étoile du Congo (Cameroon) FAP Yaoundé (Angola) Primeiro de Agosto (Senegal) Saltigue HC

== Preliminary rounds ==
Times given below are in WAT UTC+1.

=== Group A ===
Fri, 15 May 2015
TKC (Cameroon)	17 (10:09) 18	(Democratic Republic of the Congo) HC Héritage
Progresso (Angola)	28 (15:10) 16	Phoenix Gabon
Sat, 16 May 2015
TKC (Cameroon)	25 (:) 27	(Republic of the Congo) ABO Sport
Progresso (Angola)	28 (19:08) 17	(Democratic Republic of the Congo) HC Héritage
Sun, 17 May 2015
Progresso (Angola)	22 (10:10) 17	(Cameroon) TKC
ABO Sport (Republic of the Congo)	28 (15:16) 27	Phoenix Gabon
Tue, 19 May 2015
TKC (Cameroon)	21 (13:09) 24	Phoenix Gabon
ABO Sport (Republic of the Congo)	30 (15:07) 16	(Democratic Republic of the Congo) HC Héritage
Wed, 20 May 2015
Progresso (Angola)	18 (11:11) 17	(Republic of the Congo) ABO Sport
HC Héritage (Democratic Republic of the Congo)	21 (12:11) 21	Phoenix Gabon

Team	Pld	W	D	L	GF	GA	GDIF	Pts
(Angola) Progresso	4	4	0	0	96	67	+29	8
(Republic of the Congo) ABO Sport	4	3	0	1	102	86	+16	6
Phoenix Gabon	4	1	1	2	88	98	-10	3
(Democratic Republic of the Congo) HC Héritage	4	1	1	2	72	96	-24	3
(Cameroon) TKC	4	0	0	4	80	91	-11	0

* Note: Advance to quarter-finals

=== Group B ===
Fri, 15 May 2015
Africa Sports (Ivory Coast)	32 (16:12) 24	(Senegal) Saltigue HC
FAP Yaoundé (Cameroon)	23 (12:14) 29	(Republic of the Congo) Étoile du Congo
Sat, 16 May 2015
Étoile du Congo (Republic of the Congo)	31 (14:09) 22	(Senegal) Saltigue HC
1º de Agosto (Angola)	34 (14:10) 19	(Ivory Coast) Africa Sports
Sun, 17 May 2015
FAP Yaoundé (Cameroon)	35 (17:08) 23	(Senegal) Saltigue HC
1º de Agosto (Angola)	31 (15:08) 14	(Republic of the Congo) Étoile du Congo
Tue, 19 May 2015
Étoile du Congo (Republic of the Congo)	23 (14:14) 28	(Ivory Coast) Africa Sports
FAP Yaoundé (Cameroon)	25 (14:21) 45	(Angola) 1º de Agosto
Wed, 20 May 2015
FAP Yaoundé (Cameroon)	28 (13:15) 28	(Ivory Coast) Africa Sports
1º de Agosto (Angola)	33 (16:12) 21	(Senegal) Saltigue HC

Team	Pld	W	D	L	GF	GA	GDIF	Pts
(Angola) 1º de Agosto	4	4	0	0	143	79	+64	8
(Ivory Coast) Africa Sports	4	2	1	1	107	109	-2	5
(Republic of the Congo) Étoile du Congo	4	2	0	2	97	104	-7	4
(Cameroon) FAP Yaoundé	4	1	1	2	111	125	-14	3
(Senegal) Saltigue HC	4	0	0	4	90	131	-41	0

* Note: Advance to quarter-finals

== Knockout stage ==
Championship bracket

Quarter-finals
Thu 21 May 2015 – 15:00
(Angola) 1º de Agosto	38
(Democratic Republic of the Congo) Heritage	13
Thu 21 May 2015 – 11:00
(Republic of the Congo) Étoile	23
(Republic of the Congo) Abo Sport	24
Thu 21 May 2015 – 09:00
(Gabon) Phoenix	19
(Angola) Africa Sports	20
Thu 21 May 2015 – 15:00
(Angola) Progresso	20
(Cameroon) FAP Yaoundé	22

Semi-finals
Sat 23 May 2015 – 11:00
(Angola) 1º de Agosto	39
(Republic of the Congo) Abo Sport	27
Sat 23 May 2015 – 15:30
(Ivory Coast) Africa Sports	40
(Cameroon) FAP Yaoundé	38

Final
Sun 24 May 2015 – 15:00
(Angola) 1º de Agosto	36
(Ivory Coast) Africa Sports	22
Third place
Sun 24 May 2015 – 10:30
(Republic of the Congo) Abo Sport	36
(Cameroon) FAP Yaoundé	29

5-8th bracket

5th-8th place
Fri 22 May 2015 – 15:00
(Angola) Progresso	34
(Gabon) Phoenix	20
Fri 22 May 2015 – 15:00
(Republic of the Congo) Étoile	25
(Democratic Republic of the Congo) Heritage	20

Fifth place
Sat 23 May 2015 – 16:00
(Angola) Progresso	33
(Republic of the Congo) Étoile	23
Seventh place
Sat 23 May 2015 – 12:00
(Gabon) Phoenix	21
(Democratic Republic of the Congo) Heritage	19

== Final standings ==
Rank	Team	Record
Gold medal	(Angola) Primeiro de Agosto	6–0
Silver medal	(Ivory Coast) Africa Sports	4–2
Bronze medal	(Republic of the Congo) Abo Sport	4–2
4	(Cameroon) FAP Yaoundé	3–3
5	(Angola) Progresso	4–2
6	(Republic of the Congo) Étoile	1–5
7	(Gabon) Phoenix	0–6
8	(Democratic Republic of the Congo) Heritage	2–4
9	(Cameroon) TKC	2–4
10	(Senegal) Saltigue	0–6

2015 African Women's Handball Cup Winners' Cup Winner

Clube Desportivo Primeiro de Agosto
1st title

== See also ==
2015 African Women's Handball Champions League
