= Ríssia Oliveira =

Angolan handball player

Personal information
- Full name: Ríssia Inoani Cruz Oliveira
- Nationality: Angolan
- Born: 23 April 1995 (age 31)
- Height: 1.80 m (5 ft 11 in)

Sport
- Sport: Handball
- Position: Pivot
- Current club: Petro de Luanda
- Number: 26
National team
Years	Team	Apps	(Gls)
–	Angola	7	(3)

Ríssia Inoani Cruz Oliveira (born 23 April 1995) is an Angolan handball player for Petro de Luanda and the Angolan national team.

She represented Angola at the 2017 World Women's Handball Championship in Germany, and at the 2021 World Women's Handball Championship in Spain.
