= 2011 African Women's Handball Champions League =

Tournament details
- Host country: Nigeria
- Venue(s): 2 (in 1 host city)
- Dates: October 21–30
- Teams: 9

Final positions
- Champions: (Angola) Petro de Luanda (17th title)
- Runner-up: (Angola) Primeiro de Agosto
- Third place: (Cameroon) FAP Yaoundé
- Fourth place: (Republic of the Congo) CARA Brazzaville

The 2011 African Women's Handball Champions League was the 33rd edition, organized by the African Handball Confederation, under the auspices of the International Handball Federation, the handball sport governing body. The tournament was held from October 21–30 in Kaduna, Nigeria, contested by 9 teams and won by Atlético Petróleos de Luanda of Angola.

== Draw ==
Group A	Group B	Group C
(Republic of the Congo) CARA Brazzaville (Nigeria) Grasshoppers (Angola) Petro de Luanda	(Nigeria) Owena Kings (Ivory Coast) Rombo Sport (Angola) Primeiro de Agosto	(Ivory Coast) Africa Sports (Cameroon) FAP Yaoundé (Democratic Republic of the Congo) HC Héritage

== Preliminary round ==
Times given below are in WAT UTC+1.

=== Group A ===
Fri, 21 Oct 2011
Grasshoppers (Nigeria)	26 : 38	(Republic of the Congo) CARA Brazzaville
Sun, 23 Oct 2011
Petro Atlético (Angola)	38 : 22	(Nigeria) Grasshoppers
Tue, 25 Oct 2011
Petro Atlético (Angola)	35 : 25	(Republic of the Congo) CARA Brazzaville

Team	Pld	W	D	L	GF	GA	GDIF	Pts
(Angola) Petro Atlético	2	2	0	0	73	47	+26	4
(Republic of the Congo) CARA Brazzaville	2	1	0	1	63	61	+2	2
(Nigeria) Grasshoppers	2	0	0	2	48	76	-28	0

* Note: Advance to semi-finals qualification
Relegated to 7-9th classification

=== Group B ===
Sat, 22 Oct 2011
1º de Agosto (Angola)	38 : 24	(Nigeria) Owena Kings
Mon, 24 Oct 2011
Rombo Sport (Ivory Coast)	16 : 34	(Angola) 1º de Agosto
Tue, 25 Oct 2011
Owena Kings (Nigeria)	23 : 30	(Ivory Coast) Rombo Sport

Team	Pld	W	D	L	GF	GA	GDIF	Pts
(Angola) 1º de Agosto	2	2	0	0	72	40	+32	4
(Ivory Coast) Rombo Sport	2	1	0	1	46	57	-11	2
(Nigeria) Owena Kings	2	0	0	2	47	68	-21	0

* Note: Advance to semi-finals qualification
Relegated to 7-9th classification

=== Group C ===
Sat, 22 Oct 2011
FAP Yaoundé (Cameroon)	40 : 18	(Ivory Coast) Africa Sports
Mon, 24 Oct 2011
HC Héritage (Democratic Republic of the Congo)	21 : 30	(Ivory Coast) Africa Sports
Tue, 25 Oct 2011
FAP Yaoundé (Cameroon)	36 : 18	(Democratic Republic of the Congo) HC Héritage

Team	Pld	W	D	L	GF	GA	GDIF	Pts
(Cameroon) FAP Yaoundé	2	2	0	0	76	36	+40	4
(Ivory Coast) Africa Sports	2	1	0	1	48	61	-13	2
(Democratic Republic of the Congo) HC Héritage	2	0	0	2	39	66	-27	0

* Note: Advance to semi-finals qualification
Relegated to 7-9th classification

=== Semifinals qualification - Group D1 ===
Wed, 26 Oct 2011
Petro Atlético (Angola)	33 : 20	(Ivory Coast) Rombo Sport
Thu, 27 Oct 2011
FAP Yaoundé (Cameroon)	34 : 18	(Ivory Coast) Rombo Sport
Fri, 28 Oct 2011
Petro Atlético (Angola)	32 : 27	(Cameroon) FAP Yaoundé

Team	Pld	W	D	L	GF	GA	GDIF	Pts
(Angola) Petro Atlético	2	2	0	0	65	47	+22	4
(Cameroon) FAP Yaoundé	2	1	0	1	61	50	+11	2
(Ivory Coast) Rombo Sport	2	0	0	2	38	67	-29	0

* Note: Advance to semi-finals
Relegated to 5th place classification

=== Semifinals qualification - Group D2 ===
Wed, 26 Oct 2011
1º de Agosto (Angola)	41 : 20	(Ivory Coast) Africa Sports
Thu, 27 Oct 2011
1º de Agosto (Angola)	30 : 16	(Republic of the Congo) CARA Brazzaville
Fri, 28 Oct 2011
CARA Brazzaville (Republic of the Congo)	:	(Ivory Coast) Africa Sports

Team	Pld	W	D	L	GF	GA	GDIF	Pts
(Angola) 1º de Agosto	2	2	0	0	71	36	+35	4
(Republic of the Congo) CARA Brazzaville	2	1	0	1	16	30	-14	2
(Ivory Coast) Africa Sports	2	0	0	2	20	41	-21	0

* Note: Advance to semi-finals
Relegated to 5th place classification

== Knockout stage ==
Championship bracket

Semifinals
Sat 29 Oct 2011 – 16:00
(Angola) Petro Atlético	37
(Republic of the Congo) CARA Brazzaville	27
Sat 29 Oct 2011 – 18:00
(Angola) 1º de Agosto	29
(Cameroon) FAP Yaoundé	27

Final
Sun 30 Oct 2011 – 08:00
(Angola) Petro Atlético	35
(Angola) 1º de Agosto	32
Seventh place
Sun 30 Oct 2011 – 08:00
(Republic of the Congo) CARA Brazzaville	33
(Cameroon) FAP Yaoundé	35

5th place

Sat, 29 Oct 2011
Rombo Sport (Ivory Coast)	29 : 30	(Ivory Coast) Africa Sports

7–9th classification

Wed, 26 Oct 2011
Owena Kings (Nigeria)	32 : 30	(Democratic Republic of the Congo) HC Héritage
Thu, 27 Oct 2011
HC Héritage (Democratic Republic of the Congo)	25 : 26	(Nigeria) Grasshoppers
Fri, 28 Oct 2011
Grasshoppers (Nigeria)	32 : 31	(Nigeria) Owena Kings

P	Team	Pld	W	D	L	GF	GA	GDIF	Points
7	(Nigeria) Grasshoppers	2	2	0	0	58	56	+2	4
8	(Nigeria) Owena Kings	2	1	0	1	63	62	+1	2
9	(Democratic Republic of the Congo) HC Héritage	2	0	0	2	55	58	-3	0

== Final ranking ==
Rank	Team	Record
Gold medal	(Angola) Petro de Luanda	6–0
Silver medal	(Angola) Primeiro de Agosto	5–1
Bronze medal	(Cameroon) FAP Yaoundé	4–2
4	(Republic of the Congo) CARA Brazzaville	2–4
5	(Ivory Coast) Africa Sports	2–3
6	(Ivory Coast) Rombo Sport	1–4
7	(Nigeria) Grasshoppers	2–2
8	(Nigeria) Owena Kings	1–3
9	(Democratic Republic of the Congo) HC Héritage	0–4

2011 Africa Women's Handball Champions Cup Winner

Atlético Petróleos de Luanda
17th title

== See also ==
- 2014 African Handball Championship
