= 2012 African Women's Handball Champions League =

Tournament details
- Host country: Morocco
- Venues: 2 (in 1 host city)
- Dates: November 16–24
- Teams: 11

Final positions
- Champions: (Angola) Petro de Luanda (18th title)
- Runners-up: (Angola) Primeiro de Agosto
- Third place: (Cameroon) FAP Yaoundé
- Fourth place: (Republic of the Congo) ABO Sport

The 2012 African Women's Handball Champions League was the 34th edition, organized by the African Handball Confederation, under the auspices of the International Handball Federation, the handball sport governing body. The tournament was held from November 16–24 in Tangier, Morocco, contested by 11 teams and won by Atlético Petróleos de Luanda of Angola.

== Draw ==
Group A	Group B
(Cape Verde) ABC (Ivory Coast) Africa Sports National (Guinea) Olympic Club (Angola) Primeiro de Agosto (Cameroon) TKC (Senegal) Saltigue HC	(Republic of the Congo) ABO Sport (Cameroon) FAP Yaoundé (Democratic Republic of the Congo) HC Héritage (Kenya) Nairobi Water (Angola) Petro Atlético

== Preliminary round ==
Times given below are in WET UTC+0.

=== Group A ===
Fri, 16 Nov 2012
ABC (Cape Verde)	15 : 38	(Ivory Coast) Africa Sports
1º de Agosto (Angola)	51 : 15	(Guinea) Olympic Club
TKC (Cameroon)	3 : 0	(Senegal) Saltigue
Sat, 17 Nov 2012
Saltigue (Senegal)	14 : 50	(Angola) 1º de Agosto
ABC (Cape Verde)	20 : 27	(Cameroon) TKC
Olympic Club (Guinea)	15 : 31	(Ivory Coast) Africa Sports
Sun, 18 Nov 2012
Olympic Club (Guinea)	22 : 31	(Senegal) Saltigue
1º de Agosto (Angola)	50 : 11	(Cape Verde) ABC
Africa Sports (Ivory Coast)	30 : 20	(Cameroon) TKC
Mon, 19 Nov 2012
Olympic Club (Guinea)	21 : 22	(Cape Verde) ABC
TKC (Cameroon)	20 : 29	(Angola) 1º de Agosto
Africa Sports (Ivory Coast)	37 : 18	(Senegal) Saltigue
Tue, 20 Nov 2012
TKC (Cameroon)	42 : 16	(Guinea) Olympic Club
Saltigue (Senegal)	34 : 26	(Cape Verde) ABC
1º de Agosto (Angola)	30 : 17	(Ivory Coast) Africa Sports

Team	Pld	W	D	L	GF	GA	GDIF	Pts
(Angola) 1º de Agosto	5	5	0	0	210	77	+133	10
(Ivory Coast) Africa Sports	5	4	0	1	153	98	+55	8
(Cameroon) TKC	5	3	0	2	112	95	+17	6
(Senegal) Saltigue	5	2	0	3	97	138	-41	4
(Cape Verde) ABC	5	1	0	4	94	170	-76	2
(Guinea) Olympic Club	5	0	0	5	89	177	-88	0

* Note: Advance to quarter-finals
Relegated to 9th place classification

=== Group B ===
Thu, 15 Nov 2012
HC Héritage (Democratic Republic of the Congo)	22 : 23	(Republic of the Congo) ABO Sport
Petro Atlético (Angola)	46 : 9	(Kenya) Nairobi Water
Sat, 17 Nov 2012
HC Héritage (Democratic Republic of the Congo)	14 : 35	(Angola) Petro Atlético
FAP Yaoundé (Cameroon)	22 : 24	(Republic of the Congo) ABO Sport
Sun, 18 Nov 2012
ABO Sport (Republic of the Congo)	24 : 28	(Angola) Petro Atlético
Nairobi Water (Kenya)	20 : 34	(Cameroon) FAP Yaoundé
Mon, 19 Nov 2012
Petro Atlético (Angola)	29 : 19	(Cameroon) FAP Yaoundé
HC Héritage (Democratic Republic of the Congo)	32 : 20	(Kenya) Nairobi Water
Tue, 20 Nov 2012
Nairobi Water (Kenya)	20 : 36	(Republic of the Congo) ABO Sport
FAP Yaoundé (Cameroon)	23 : 22	(Democratic Republic of the Congo) HC Héritage

Team	Pld	W	D	L	GF	GA	GDIF	Pts
(Angola) Petro Atlético	4	4	0	0	138	66	+72	8
(Republic of the Congo) ABO Sport	4	3	0	1	107	92	+15	6
(Cameroon) FAP Yaoundé	4	2	0	2	98	95	3	4
(Democratic Republic of the Congo) HC Héritage	4	1	0	3	90	101	-11	2
(Kenya) Nairobi Water	4	0	0	4	69	148	-79	0

* Note: Advance to quarter-finals
Relegated to 9th place classification

== Knockout stage ==
Championship bracket

Quarter-finals
Thu 22 Nov 2012 – 12:00
(Cameroon) TKC	14
(Republic of the Congo) ABO Sport	16
Thu 22 Nov 2012 – 14:00
(Cameroon) FAP Yaoundé	32
(Ivory Coast) Africa Sports	23
Thu 22 Nov 2012 – 16:00
(Angola) 1º de Agosto	30
(Democratic Republic of the Congo) HC Héritage	14
Thu 22 Nov 2012 – 18:00
(Angola) Petro Atlético	41
(Senegal) Saltigue HC	15

Semi-finals
Fri 23 Nov 2012 – 14:00
(Angola) 1º de Agosto	27
(Republic of the Congo) ABO Sport	20
Fri 23 Nov 2012 – 18:00
(Cameroon) FAP Yaoundé	25
(Angola) Petro Atlético	36

Final
Sat 24 Nov 2012 – 16:00
(Angola) Petro Atlético	29
(Angola) 1º de Agosto	23
Third place
Sat 24 Nov 2012 – 12:30
(Republic of the Congo) ABO Sport	24
(Cameroon) FAP Yaoundé	25

5-8th bracket

5–8th place
Fri 23 Nov 2012 – 16:00
(Ivory Coast) Africa Sports	31
(Senegal) Saltigue HC	22
Fri 23 Nov 2012 – 20:00
(Democratic Republic of the Congo) HC Héritage	18
(Cameroon) TKC	27

Fifth place
Sat 24 Nov 2012 – 08:00
(Ivory Coast) Africa Sports	33
(Cameroon) TKC	34
Seventh place
Sat 24 Nov 2012 – 08:00
(Senegal) Saltigue HC	26
(Democratic Republic of the Congo) HC Héritage	30

9th place

Semi-finals

Ninth place
Fri 23 Nov 2012 – 20:00
(Cape Verde) ABC	20
(Kenya) Nairobi Water	27
Eleventh place

== Final ranking ==
Rank	Team	Record
Gold medal	(Angola) Petro de Luanda	7–0
Silver medal	(Angola) Primeiro de Agosto	7–1
Bronze medal	(Cameroon) FAP Yaoundé	4–3
4	(Republic of the Congo) ABO Sport	4–3
5	(Cameroon) TKC	5–3
6	(Ivory Coast) Africa Sports	5–3
7	(Democratic Republic of the Congo) HC Héritage	2–5
8	(Senegal) Saltigue HC	2–6
9	(Kenya) Nairobi Water	1–4
10	(Cape Verde) ABC	1–5
11	(Guinea) Olympic Club	0–5

2012 Africa Women's Handball Champions Cup Winner

Atlético Petróleos de Luanda
18th title

== See also ==
- 2014 African Handball Championship
