= African Women's Handball Champions League =

Handball competition

- Founded: 1979
- Country: Africa
- Confederation: CAHB members
- Most recent champion: (Egypt) Al Ahly SC (2026)
- Most titles: (Angola) Petro Atlético (19 titles)
- 2024 African Women's Handball Champions League

The Africa Women's Handball Championship for Clubs Champions is an annual international women's handball club competition run by the African Handball Confederation. The top club sides from Africa's women's handball leagues are invited to participate in this competition.

== Summary ==
Year	Host		Final			Third place match		
Year	Host		Champion	Score	Second place	Third place	Score	Fourth place
1979; Details	(Egypt); Cairo		Al Ahly SC (Egypt)	–	(Nigeria) Grasshoppers HT of Owerri	US Rail (Senegal)	–	
1980; Details	(Ivory Coast); Bouaké		Gezira Cairo (Egypt)	8–7	(Algeria) Nadit Alger	(Nigeria) Grasshoppers HT of Owerri and ?		
1981; Details	(Senegal); Dakar		Air Afrique Bouaké (Ivory Coast) ^{1}	No contestants				
1982; Details	(Ivory Coast); Bouaké		Grasshoppers HT of Owerri (Nigeria)	12–10	(Ivory Coast) Air Afrique Bouake		–	
1983; Details	(Republic of the Congo); Brazzaville		ASC Bouake (Ivory Coast)	21–15	(Republic of the Congo) CARA Brazzaville	AS CAMI (Cameroon)	20–14	(Algeria) Nadit Alger
1984; Details	(Senegal); Dakar		ASC Bouake (Ivory Coast)	19–17	(Republic of the Congo) Étoile du Congo	Grasshoppers HT of Lagos (Nigeria)	–	(Republic of the Congo) Shippings of Douala
1985; Details	(Morocco); Rabat		Étoile du Congo (Republic of the Congo)	22–16	(Nigeria) Grasshoppers HT of Owerri	ASC Bouake (Ivory Coast)	22–15	(Ivory Coast) AS BIAO Abidjan
1986; Details	(Gabon); Libreville		Étoile du Congo (Republic of the Congo)	21–18	(Cameroon) AS CAMI	Grasshoppers HT of Owerri (Nigeria)	–	
1987; Details	(Nigeria); Owerri		Ferroportuária (Angola)	19–15	(Nigeria) Grasshoppers HT of Owerri	Étoile du Congo (Republic of the Congo)	20–18	(Nigeria) Poly Babes of Bauchi
1988; Details	(Benin); Cotonou		Grasshoppers HT of Owerri (Nigeria)	19–16	(Republic of the Congo) AS Cheminot	Petro Atlético (Angola)	26–25	(Cameroon) Camship
1989; Details	(Ivory Coast); Abidjan / Bouake		USC Bassam (Ivory Coast)	–	(Cameroon) Camship	Ferroportuária (Angola)	–	
1990; Details	(Republic of the Congo); Brazzaville		Étoile du Congo (Republic of the Congo)	–	(Cameroon) Camship	Africa Sports (Ivory Coast)	–	
1991; Details	(Nigeria); Kano		Africa Sports (Ivory Coast)	^{n/a}	(Angola) Petro Atlético	CNPS Yaoundé (Cameroon)	^{n/a}	
1992; Details	(Ivory Coast); Yamoussoukro		Africa Sports (Ivory Coast)	^{n/a}	(Angola) Petro Atlético	Étoile du Congo (Republic of the Congo)	^{n/a}	
1993; Details	(Tunisia); Tunis		Petro Atlético (Angola)	–	(Ivory Coast) Africa Sports	Étoile du Congo (Republic of the Congo)	–	
1994; Details	(Benin); Cotonou		Étoile du Congo (Republic of the Congo)	21–20	(Ivory Coast) Africa Sports	Petro Atlético (Angola)	–	
1995; Details	(Benin); Cotonou		Petro Atlético (Angola)	–	(Ivory Coast) Africa Sports	Étoile du Congo (Republic of the Congo)	–	
1996; Details	(Benin); Cotonou		Africa Sports (Ivory Coast)	17–16	(Algeria) MC Alger	Petro Atlético (Angola)	–	(Angola) ASA
1997; Details	(Niger); Niamey		Petro Atlético (Angola)	26–24	(Ivory Coast) Africa Sports	MC Alger (Algeria)	–	(Republic of the Congo) Palco Sport
1998; Details	(Benin); Cotonou		Petro Atlético (Angola)	27–25	(Ivory Coast) Africa Sports	CARA Brazzaville (Republic of the Congo)	20–19	(Republic of the Congo) Inter Club
1999; Details	(Niger); Niamey		Petro Atlético (Angola)	25–21	(Ivory Coast) Africa Sports	RAC Abidjan (Ivory Coast)	–	
2000; Details	(Benin); Cotonou		Petro Atlético (Angola)	25–19	(Ivory Coast) Africa Sports	Rombo Sport (Ivory Coast)	–	
2001; Details	(Nigeria); Benin City		Petro Atlético (Angola)	36–18	(Ivory Coast) Africa Sports	Rombo Sport (Ivory Coast)	24–12	(Republic of the Congo) Étoile du Congo
2002; Details	(Gabon); Libreville		Petro Atlético (Angola)	32–30	(Angola) ENANA	Rombo Sport (Ivory Coast)	–	
2003; Details	(Benin); Cotonou		Petro Atlético (Angola)	32–30	(Ivory Coast) Rombo Sport	Inter Club (Republic of the Congo)	–	
2004; Details	(Morocco); Casablanca		Petro Atlético (Angola)	36–25	(Republic of the Congo) Inter Club	TKC (Cameroon)	–	
2005; Details	(Ivory Coast); Abidjan		Petro Atlético (Angola)	26–21	(Ivory Coast) Rombo Sport	ASA (Angola)	36–26	(Cameroon) FAP Yaoundé
2006; Details	(Ivory Coast); Abidjan		Petro Atlético (Angola)	40–25	(Ivory Coast) Rombo Sport	Africa Sports (Ivory Coast)	–	
2007; Details	(Benin); Cotonou		Petro Atlético (Angola)	43–27	(Angola) ASA	Africa Sports (Ivory Coast)	–	
2008; Details	(Morocco); Casablanca		Petro Atlético (Angola)	31–19	(Cameroon) TKC	Rombo Sport (Ivory Coast)	–	(Cameroon) FAP Yaoundé
2009; Details	(Cameroon); Yaoundé		Petro Atlético (Angola)	29–24	(Angola) 1º de Agosto	Inter Club (Republic of the Congo)	–	(Ivory Coast) Rombo Sport
2010; Details	(Morocco); Casablanca		Petro Atlético (Angola)	35–22	(Republic of the Congo) Inter Club	FAP Yaoundé (Cameroon)	36–23	(Morocco) Union Nouasser
2011; Details	(Nigeria); Kaduna		Petro Atlético (Angola)	35–32	(Angola) 1º de Agosto	FAP Yaoundé (Cameroon)	35–33	(Republic of the Congo) CARA Brazzaville
2012; Details	(Morocco); Tangier		Petro Atlético (Angola)	29–23	(Angola) 1º de Agosto	FAP Yaoundé (Cameroon)	25–24	(Republic of the Congo) ABO Sport
2013; Details	(Morocco); Marrakesh		Petro Atlético (Angola)	31–27	(Angola) 1º de Agosto	Progresso (Angola)	33–30	(Republic of the Congo) Inter Club
2014; Details	(Tunisia); Tunis		1º de Agosto (Angola)	27–25	(Angola) Petro Atlético	Progresso (Angola)	28–25	(Republic of the Congo) Étoile du Congo
2015; Details	(Morocco); Nador		1º de Agosto (Angola)	23–21	(Angola) Petro Atlético	FAP Yaoundé (Cameroon)	31–22	(Ivory Coast) Africa Sports
2016; Details	(Burkina Faso); Ouagadougou		1º de Agosto (Angola)	42–25	(Republic of the Congo) ASEL	FAP Yaoundé (Cameroon)	30–24	(Cameroon) TKC
2017; Details	(Tunisia); Hammamet		1º de Agosto (Angola)	30–17	(Tunisia) ASF Sfax	FAP Yaoundé (Cameroon)	31–24	(Republic of the Congo) ABO Sport
2018; Details	(Ivory Coast); Abidjan		1º de Agosto (Angola)	25–21	(Angola) Petro Atlético	ABO Sport (Republic of the Congo)	27–22	(Cameroon) FAP Yaoundé
2019; Details	(Cape Verde); Praia		1º de Agosto (Angola)	18–16	(Angola) Petro Atlético	ABO Sport (Republic of the Congo)	29–28	(Republic of the Congo) DGSP
2020			Canceled due to COVID-19 pandemic					
2021			Canceled due to lack of host country					
2022; Details	(Tunisia); Hammamet		1º de Agosto (Angola)	29–24	(Angola) Petro Atlético	CSF Moknine (Tunisia)	26–24	(Republic of the Congo) DGSP
2023; Details	(Republic of the Congo); Brazzaville		1º de Agosto (Angola)	28–26	(Angola) Petro Atlético	DGSP (Republic of the Congo)	33–23	(Egypt) Al Ahly
2024; Details	(Cameroon); Yaoundé			–			–	
2026; Details	(Angola); Luanda	Al Ahly SC (Egypt)	21–20	(Angola) 1º de Agosto	Petro Atlético (Angola)	42–24	(Ivory Coast) Abidjan HBC	

^1 Air Afrique Bouaké was the only contestant.
^n/a A round-robin tournament determined the final standings.

== Winners by club ==
As of November 2026

#	Nat	Clubs	Winners	Runners-up	Thirds	Total
1	(Angola)	Petro Atlético	19	8	4	31
2	(Angola)	Primeiro de Agosto	8	6	0	14
3	(Republic of the Congo)	Étoile du Congo	4	1	4	9
4	(Ivory Coast)	Africa Sports National	3	7	4	14
5	(Egypt)	Al-Ahly SC	3	0	0	3
6	(Nigeria)	Grasshoppers Owerri	2	3	1	6
7	(Ivory Coast)	ASC Bouake	2	0	1	3
8	(Ivory Coast)	Air Afrique Bouake	1	1	0	2
9	(Angola)	Ferroviário de Luanda	1	0	1	2
10	(Ivory Coast)	USC Bassam	1	0	0	1
10	(Egypt)	Gezira Cairo	1	0	0	1
12	(Ivory Coast)	Rombo Sport Kpouebo	0	3	4	7
13	(Republic of the Congo)	Inter Club Brazzaville	0	2	2	4
13	(Cameroon)	Camship	0	2	0	2
15	(Angola)	ASA	0	1	1	2
15	(Algeria)	MC Alger	0	1	1	2
15	(Republic of the Congo)	CARA Brazzaville	0	1	1	2
15	(Cameroon)	TKC	0	1	1	2
15	(Cameroon)	AS CAMI	0	1	1	2
20	(Tunisia)	ASF Sfax	0	1	0	1
20	(Republic of the Congo)	ASEL	0	1	0	1
20	(Republic of the Congo)	AS Cheminot	0	1	0	1
20	(Angola)	ENANA	0	1	0	1
20	(Algeria)	Nadit Alger	0	1	0	1
25	(Cameroon)	FAP Yaoundé	0	0	6	6
26	(Angola)	Progresso do Sambizanga	0	0	2	2
26	(Republic of the Congo)	Abo Sport	0	0	2	2
28	(Tunisia)	CSF Moknine	0	0	1	1
28	(Cameroon)	CNPS Yaoundé	0	0	1	1
28	(Ivory Coast)	RAC Abidjan	0	0	1	1
28	(Republic of the Congo)	DGSP	0	0	1	1

- Rq

GS Pétroliers (ex. MC Alger HB)

== Winners by country ==
As of November 2026

#	Nation	Winners	Runners-up	Thirds	Total
1	Angola	27	17	6	50
2	Ivory Coast	8	11	10	29
3	(Republic of the Congo) Congo	4	6	9	19
4	Egypt	3	0	0	4
5	Nigeria	2	3	1	6
6	Cameroon	0	4	9	13
7	Algeria	0	2	1	3
8	Tunisia	0	1	1	2

== Participation details 2000– ==
Nat
Nat	Club	(Benin)	(Benin)	(Gabon)	(Benin)	(Morocco)	(Ivory Coast)	(Ivory Coast)	(Benin)	(Morocco)	(Cameroon)	(Morocco)	(Nigeria)	(Morocco)	(Morocco)	(Tunisia)	(Morocco)	(Burkina Faso)	(Tunisia)	(Ivory Coast)	(Cape Verde)	(Tunisia)	(Republic of the Congo)	(Angola)	
Nat	Club	2000	2001	2002	2003	2004	2005	2006	2007	2008	2009	2010	2011	2012	2013	2014	2015	2016	2017	2018	2019	2022	2023	2026	
Nat	Club		X	X	X	X	X	X	X	X	8	10	9	11	9	10	10	9	8	9	8	8	8	8	
(Cape Verde)	ABC														10	7									2
(Ivory Coast)	Abidjan HC																							4	1
(Republic of the Congo)	ABO Sport													4			5		4	3 2018	3 2019				5
(Ivory Coast)	Africa Sports	2 2000	2 2001					3 2006	3 2007				5	6	6	6	4		7	5					21
(Egypt)	Al Ahly																6						4	1 2026	4
(Burkina Faso)	AS ONEA																	8							1
(Angola)	ASA						3 2005		2 2007																2
(Republic of the Congo)	ASEL																	2 2016							1
(Tunisia)	ASF Sahel											5													1
(Tunisia)	ASF Sfax																		2 2017						1
(Benin)	ASPAC																	7							1
(Cape Verde)	Atlético do Mindelo																				7				1
(Ivory Coast)	Bandama																	9	5	9	8		5		5
(Republic of the Congo)	CARA Brazzaville												4												3
(Angola)	CPPL																							7	1
(Tunisia)	CSF Moknine																					3 2022			1
(Republic of the Congo)	DGSP																				4	4	3 2023		3
(Cameroon)	Dynamique																			6					1
(Angola)	ENANA			2 2002																					1
(Republic of the Congo)	Étoile du Congo															4									12
(Cameroon)	FANZ																						7		1
(Cameroon)	FAP Yaoundé									4		03 2010	3 2011	03 2012	5	5	03 2015	3 2016	3 2017	4	5		6		12
(Benin)	Flowers CNSS																							5	1
(Republic of the Congo)	Grain de Sel																						8		1
(Nigeria)	Grasshoppers												7												7
(Algeria)	MC Alger																		6						3
(Democratic Republic of the Congo)	HC Héritage											6	9	7			9			8	6			6	7
(Democratic Republic of the Congo)	HC Mazembe																							8	1
(Democratic Republic of the Congo)	HC Nuru															9									1
(Democratic Republic of the Congo)	HC Vainqueur											8							8	7					3
(Republic of the Congo)	Inter Club				3 2003	2 2004					3 2009	02 2010			4										6
(Democratic Republic of the Congo)	Mikishi															8		6							2
(Kenya)	Nairobi Water													9	9	7	10	5							5
(Guinea)	Olympic Club													11											1
(Nigeria)	Owena Kings												8												1
(Angola)	Petro de Luanda	1 2000	1 2001	1 2002	1 2003	1 2004	1 2005	1 2006	1 2007	1 2008	1 2009	01 2010	1 2011	01 2012	1 2013	02 2014	02 2015			2 2018	2 2019	2 2022	2 2023	3 2026	31
(Gabon)	Phoenix Gabon											9				10	8								3
(Angola)	Primeiro de Agosto										2 2009		2 2011	02 2012	2 2013	01 2014	01 2015	1 2016	1 2017	1 2018	1 2019	1 2022	1 2023	2 2026	13
(Angola)	Progresso														3 2013	03 2014									1
(Ivory Coast)	Rombo Sport	3 2000	3 2001	3 2002	2 2003		2 2005	2 2006		3 2008	4	10	6												10
(Senegal)	Saltigue HC											7		8											2
(Gabon)	Stade Mandji														8										1
(Cameroon)	TKC					3 2004				2 2008				5			7	4							5
(Morocco)	US Nouasseur											4													1
# Teams		2000 x	2001 x	2002 x	2003 x	2004 x	2005 x	2006 x	2007 x	2008 x	2009 8	2010 10	2011 9	2012 11	2013 9	2014 10	2015 10	2016 9	2017 8	2018 9	2019 8	2022 8	2023 8	2026 8	

== Participation details 1979–1999 ==
Nat
Nat	Club	(Egypt)	(Ivory Coast)	(Senegal)	(Ivory Coast)	(Republic of the Congo)	(Senegal)	(Morocco)	(Gabon)	(Nigeria)	(Benin)	(Ivory Coast)	(Republic of the Congo)	(Nigeria)	(Ivory Coast)	(Tunisia)	(Benin)	(Benin)	(Benin)	(Niger)	(Benin)	(Niger)	
Nat	Club	1979	1980	1981	1982	1983	1984	1985	1986	1987	1988	1989	1990	1991	1992	1993	1994	1995	1996	1997	1998	1999	
Nat	Club	X	X	X	X	X	X	6	X	X	X	X	X	X	X	X	X	X	X	X	X	X	
(Ivory Coast)	Africa Sports												1990	1991	1992	1993	1994	1995	1996	1997	1998	1999	21
(Ivory Coast)	Air Afrique Bouake			1981	1982																		2
(Egypt)	Al Ahly	1979																					2
(Ivory Coast)	AS BiaoGezira Cairo							4															1
(Cameroon)	AS CAMI								1986														1
(Republic of the Congo)	AS Cheminot										1988												1
(Ivory Coast)	ASC Bouake					1983	1984	1985															3
(Morocco)	Barid Marrakech							6															1
(Cameroon)	Camship										4	1989	1990										2
(Republic of the Congo)	CARA Brazzaville					1983															1991		3
(Cameroon)	CNPS Yaoundé													1991									1
(Republic of the Congo)	Étoile du Congo						1984	1 1985	1986	1987			1990		1992	1993	1994	1995					12
(Angola)	Ferroviário de Luanda									1987		1989											2
(Egypt)	Gezira Cairo		1980																				1
(Nigeria)	Grasshoppers	1979			1982			1985	1986	1987	1988												7
(Algeria)	MC Alger																		1996	1997			3
(Algeria)	Nadit Alger		1980																				1
(Angola)	Petro de Luanda							5			1988			1991	1992	1993	1994	1995	1996	1997	1998	1999	28
(Ivory Coast)	USC Bassam											1989											1
(Senegal)	US Rail	1979																					1
# Teams		1979 x	1980 x	1981 x	1982 x	1983 x	1984 x	1985 6	1986 x	1987 x	1988 x	1989 x	1990 x	1991 x	1992 x	1993 x	1994 x	1995 x	1996 x	1997 x	1998 x	1999 x	

== See also ==
- African Women's Handball Cup Winners' Cup
- African Women's Handball Super Cup
