= 2015 African Women's Handball Champions League =

Tournament details
- Host country: Morocco
- Venues: 3 (in 1 host city)
- Dates: 21–30 October, 2015
- Teams: 10 (from 1 confederation)

Final positions
- Champions: (Angola) 1º de Agosto (2nd title)
- Runners-up: (Angola) Petro Atlético
- Third place: (Cameroon) FAP Yaoundé
- Fourth place: (Ivory Coast) Africa Sports

Tournament statistics
- Matches played: 33
- Goals scored: 1,817 (55.06 per match)

The 2015 African Women's Handball Champions League was the 37th edition, organized by the African Handball Confederation, under the auspices of the International Handball Federation, the handball sport governing body. The tournament was held from October 21–30, 2015 in three venues: Salle Al Aroui, Salle Omnisport and Salle Sellaouan, in Nador, Morocco, contested by 10 teams and won by Clube Desportivo Primeiro de Agosto of Angola.

== Draw ==
Group A	Group B
(Ivory Coast) Africa Sports National (Cameroon) FAP Yaoundé (Kenya) Nairobi Water (Angola) Petro Atlético; Phoenix Gabon	(Republic of the Congo) ABO Sport (Egypt) Al Ahly (Democratic Republic of the Congo) HC Héritage (Angola) Primeiro de Agosto (Cameroon) TKC

== Preliminary round ==
Times given below are in WET UTC+0.

=== Group A ===
Wed, 21 Oct 2015
Nairobi Water (Kenya)	12 (05:19) 35	(Angola) Petro Atlético
Africa Sports (Ivory Coast)	25 (14:10) 24	(Cameroon) FAP Yaoundé
Thu, 22 Oct 2015
Petro Atlético (Angola)	38 (18:02) 9	Phoenix Gabon
Nairobi Water (Kenya)	20 (10:17) 36	(Cameroon) FAP Yaoundé
Fri, 23 Oct 2015
Africa Sports (Ivory Coast)	36 (22:09) 22	(Kenya) Nairobi Water
FAP Yaoundé (Cameroon)	39 (19:12) 24	Phoenix Gabon
Sat, 24 Oct 2015
Phoenix Gabon	36 (22:11) 28	(Kenya) Nairobi Water
Petro Atlético (Angola)	22 (11:10) 18	(Ivory Coast) Africa Sports
Mon, 26 Oct 2015
FAP Yaoundé (Cameroon)	27 (15:15) 34	(Angola) Petro Atlético
Phoenix Gabon	22 (13:13) 26	(Ivory Coast) Africa Sports

Team	Pld	W	D	L	GF	GA	GDIF	Pts
(Angola) Petro Atlético	4	4	0	0	129	66	+63	8
(Ivory Coast) Africa Sports	4	3	0	1	105	90	+15	6
(Cameroon) FAP Yaoundé	4	2	0	2	126	103	+23	4
Phoenix Gabon	4	1	0	3	91	131	-40	2
(Kenya) Nairobi Water	4	0	0	4	82	143	-61	0

* Note: Advance to quarter-finals
Relegated to 9th place classification

=== Group B ===
Wed, 21 Oct 2015
HC Héritage (Democratic Republic of the Congo)	24 (12:11) 24	(Cameroon) TKC
ABO Sport (Republic of the Congo)	29 (12:06) 15	(Egypt) Al Ahly
Thu, 22 Oct 2015
1º de Agosto (Angola)	42 (20:06) 16	(Egypt) Al Ahly
ABO Sport (Republic of the Congo)	22 (12:13) 22	(Cameroon) TKC
Fri, 23 Oct 2015
ABO Sport (Republic of the Congo)	41 (23:18) 32	(Democratic Republic of the Congo) HC Héritage
1º de Agosto (Angola)	26 (09:06) 16	(Cameroon) TKC
Sat, 24 Oct 2015
TKC (Cameroon)	19 (05:09) 21	(Egypt) Al Ahly
HC Héritage (Democratic Republic of the Congo)	21 (10:25) 50	(Angola) 1º de Agosto
Mon, 26 Oct 2015
ABO Sport (Republic of the Congo)	26 (12:18) 34	(Angola) 1º de Agosto
HC Héritage (Democratic Republic of the Congo)	23 (07:18) 34	(Egypt) Al Ahly

Team	Pld	W	D	L	GF	GA	GDIF	Pts
(Egypt) 1º de Agosto	4	4	0	0	172	79	+93	8
(Republic of the Congo) ABO Sport	4	2	1	1	138	103	+35	5
(Egypt) Al Ahly	4	2	0	2	106	113	-7	4
(Cameroon) TKC	4	0	2	2	101	93	+8	2
(Democratic Republic of the Congo) HC Héritage	4	0	1	3	120	149	-29	1

* Note: Advance to quarter-finals
Relegated to 9th place classification

== Knockout stage ==
Championship bracket

Quarter-finals
Tue 27 Oct 2015 – 15:00
(Angola) 1º de Agosto	40
Phoenix Gabon	15
Tue 27 Oct 2015 – 19:00
(Ivory Coast) Africa Sports	25
(Egypt) Al Ahly	19
Tue 27 Oct 2015 – 13:00
(Angola) Petro Atlético	30
(Cameroon) TKC	17
Tue 27 Oct 2015 – 17:00
(Cameroon) FAP Yaoundé	27
(Gabon) ABO Sport	25

Semi-finals
Wed 28 Oct 2015 – 15:00
(Angola) 1º de Agosto	31
(Ivory Coast) Africa Sports	21
Wed 28 Oct 2015 – 12:30
(Angola) Petro Atlético	28
(Cameroon) FAP Yaoundé	20

Final
Fri 30 Oct 2015 – 14:00
(Angola) 1º de Agosto	23
(Angola) Petro Atlético	21
Third place
Fri 30 Oct 2015 – 10:00
(Cameroon) FAP Yaoundé	31
(Ivory Coast) Africa Sports	22

5-8th bracket

Semifinals
Wed 28 Oct 2015 – 11:00
(Gabon) ABO Sport	28
(Cameroon) TKC	14
Wed 28 Oct 2015 – 13:00
(Egypt) Al Ahly	27
Phoenix Gabon	26

Fifth place
Thu 29 Oct 2015 – 14:00
(Gabon) ABO Sport	35
(Egypt) Al Ahly	22
Seventh place
Thu 29 Oct 2015 – 12:00
(Cameroon) TKC	29
Phoenix Gabon	21

9th place

Semi-finals

Ninth place
Thu 29 Oct 2015 – 11:30
(Democratic Republic of the Congo) HC Héritage	27
(Kenya) Nairobi Water	23
Third place

== Final ranking ==
Rank	Team	Record
Gold medal	(Angola) Primeiro de Agosto	7–0
Silver medal	(Angola) Petro Atlético	6–1
Bronze medal	(Cameroon) FAP Youndé	4–3
4	(Ivory Coast) Africa Sports	4–3
5	(Gabon) ABO Sport	4–2
6	(Egypt) Al Ahly	3–4
7	(Cameroon) TKC	1–3
8	Phoenix Gabon	1–6
9	(Democratic Republic of the Congo) HC Héritage	1–3
10	(Kenya) Nairobi Water	0–5

2015 Africa Women's Handball Champions Cup Winner

Clube Desportivo Primeiro de Agosto
2nd title

== See also ==
- 2015 African Women's Handball Cup Winners' Cup
- 2014 African Women's Handball Championship
