= Atlético Petróleos de Luanda (handball) =

- Full name: Atlético Petróleos de Luanda
- Short name: Petro de Luanda
- Founded: January 14, 1980 (46 years ago)
- Arena: Campo do Gama; Pavilhão da Cidadela, Luanda
- Capacity: 1,500
- President: Tomás Faria
- Head coach: José Pereira Kidó
- League: 2× Angola League
- Club colours
Home	Away

Atlético Petróleos de Luanda is an Angolan multisports club based in Luanda. The club's handball teams (men and women) compete at the local level, at the Luanda Provincial Handball Championship and at the Men's and Women's leagues as well as at continental level, at the annual Champions League, Cup Winner's Cup and Super Cup competitions. Undoubtedly, the women's handball team of Petro Atlético has been the most successful team in Africa for many years.

== Petro Atlético Men's Handball ==
=== Honours: Men's Handball ===
- National Championship :
  - Winner (2): 1985, 2014
  - Runner Up (0) :
- Angola Cup:
  - Winner 0:
  - Runner Up (1) : 2014
- Angola Super Cup:
  - Winner (0):
  - Runner Up (0) :
- CHAB Club Champions Cup:
  - Winner (0):
  - Runner Up (0) :

=== Squad (Men) ===
Updated as of June 2016

Petro de Luanda Men's Handball squad
**Goalkeepers**

* 01  Anírio Wanuque
* 12  Joaquim Sebastião Paizinho 
* 33  Fábio Costa Yao Ming

**Wingers**

* 05  Etelvino Salula
* 08  Patrick Pembele
* 09  Mayomona Panzo Netinho
* 77  Manuel José 

**Back players**

* 02  Edson Esteves
* 03  Mário Tati Cabinda 27-190-80
* 10  Patrício Baptista
* 11  Francisco Marçal 36-185-77
* 17  Arão Satyaku
* 25  Nelson Varela 29-183

**Line players**

* 06  André Kassapi Matos 20-183-121
* 26  Abiato Martins

**Other players**

* 15  Sebastião Rocha

**Technical staff**

 *     André Costa Head Coach 

- Players in **bold** indicate starting lineup

=== Manager history ===
- (Angola) André Costa – 2018

=== Players ===
Atlético Petróleos de Luanda
- Full name: Atlético Petróleos de Luanda
- Short name: Petro de Luanda
- Founded: January 14, 1980 (46 years ago)
- Arena: Campo do Gama; Pavilhão da Cidadela, Luanda
- Capacity: 1,500
- President: Tomás Faria
- Head coach: Vivaldo Eduardo
- League: 21× Angola League; 10× Angola Cup; 9× Angola Super Cup; 19× Africa Champions Cup; 16× Africa Super Cup; 8× Africa Cup Winners Cup
- Club colours
Home	Away

== Petro Atlético Women's Handball ==
Petro de Luanda is the most successful women's handball club in Africa with a record total of 42 titles of which 19 in the champions cup, 16 in the super cup and 7 in the cup winner's cup.

=== Honours: Women's Handball ===
- Angola National Championship :
  - Winner (21): 1989, 1990, 1991, 1992, 1993, 1994, 1995, 1996, 1998, 2000, 2001, 2002, 2003, 2004, 2005, 2006, 2007, 2008, 2009, 2010, 2012
  - Runner Up (6) : 2011, 2013, 2014, 2015, 2016, 2017
- Angola Cup :
  - Winner (10): 2006, 2007, 2008, 2010, 2011, 2012, 2013, 2014, 2016, 2017
  - Runner Up (1) : 2015
- Angola Super Cup :
  - Winner (9): 2008, 2009, 2010, 2011, 2012, 2013, 2014, 2015, 2017
  - Runner Up (2) : 2016, 2019
- African Champions League :
  - Winner (19): 1993, 1995, 1997, 1998, 1999, 2000, 2001, 2002, 2003, 2004, 2005, 2006, 2007, 2008, 2009, 2010, 2011, 2012, 2013
  - Runner Up (6) :1991, 1992, 1994, 1996, 2014, 2015
- CHAB Babacar Fall Super Cup :
  - Winner (18): 1994, 1996, 1998, 1999, 2000, 2001, 2002, 2003, 2005, 2006, 2007, 2008, 2009, 2010, 2011, 2012, 2013, 2014
  - Runner Up (4) :1995, 1997, 2015, 2019
- CHAB Cup Winner's Cup :
  - Winner (8): 2008, 2009, 2010, 2011, 2012, 2013, 2014, 2018
  - Runner Up (1) : 2019

=== Squad (Women) ===
Updated as of May 2021

Petro de Luanda Women's Handball squad
**Goalkeepers**

* 1  Marta Alberto 26-180-78
* 16  Teresa Almeida Bá 33-180-140 (C)

**Wingers**

* 03  Madalena Vunge 25-L-177-68
* 06  Natália Kamalandua 23-R-165-57
* 09  Manuela Paulino Nelma 25-L-175-74
* 18  Emingarda Ferreira 22-R-?-?

**Back players**

* 02  Vilma Nenganga 25-L-178-66
* 04  Delfina Mungongo Didí 32-U-174-83
* 10  Tchesa Pemba 26-R-178-82
* 11  Marília Quizelete Inglesa 23-C-170-65
* 20  Stélvia Pascoal 31-B-180-81
* 21  Magda Cazanga 30-B-180-81
* 26  Ríssia Oliveira 26-B-177-98

**Line players**

* 07  Edith Mbunga 30-180-81
* 13  Estefânia Venâncio 22-176-87
* 31  Janete Santos 30-180-78

**Technical staff**

 *     Vivaldo Eduardo Head Coach 
 *     Edgar Neto  Assistant Coach

- Players in **bold** indicate starting lineup

1980–2016

=== Players ===
Petro de Luanda women handball players

==== 2011–2017 ====
C = African champions cup winner

Nat	#	Name	A	P	H	W	Vivaldo Eduardo							
Nat	#	Name	A	P	H	W	2011	2012	2013	2014	2015	2016	2017	2018
Nat	#	Name	A	P	H	W	C	LC	C	2	2	3	–	–
(Angola)	⋅	Acilene Sebastião	31	B			⋅	⋅	7	⋅	7	⋅	⋅	⋅
(Angola)	⋅	Albertina Mambrio Jane	24	B	1.80	96	⋅	⋅	–	⋅	15	15	⋅	⋅
(Angola)	10	Alexandra Chaca	22	W	1.69	55	⋅	⋅	⋅	⋅	⋅	8	8	2018
(Angola)	⋅	Amélia Caliumbo Mami					⋅	⋅	⋅	⋅	⋅	25	⋅	⋅
(Angola)	⋅	Anastácia Sibo	32	P	1.89	86	⋅	⋅	15	15	⋅	⋅	⋅	⋅
(Angola)	⋅	Antónia dos Santos Luena	22	W	1.77	58	⋅	⋅	→	27	27	27	⋅	⋅
(Angola)	35	Azenaide Carlos	28	B	1.75	60	⋅	⋅	⋅	35	35	35	35	2018
(Angola)	⋅	Bombo Calandula Mami	30	P	1.76	72	⋅	⋅	–	⋅	⋅	⋅	⋅	⋅
(Angola)	⋅	Cássia Assis		P	1.80		⋅	⋅	⋅	→	13	13	⋅	⋅
(Angola)	⋅	Constantina Paulo Saldanha	30	P	1.85	74	⋅	⋅	–	⋅	⋅	⋅	⋅	⋅
(Angola)	⋅	Delfina Mungongo	31	B			⋅	⋅	4	4	4	4	⋅	⋅
(Angola)	⋅	Flora da Costa					⋅	⋅	⋅	⋅	24	–	⋅	⋅
(Angola)	⋅	Iovânia Quinzole	21	W	1.70	71	⋅	⋅	–	⋅	⋅	⋅	⋅	⋅
(Angola)	⋅	Iracelma Silva	23	W	1.74	53	⋅	⋅	14	14	⋅	⋅	⋅	⋅
(Angola)	⋅	Isabel Fernandes Belezura	30	W	1.80	82	⋅	⋅	10	10	10	⋅	⋅	⋅
(Angola)	⋅	Ivete Simão	25	GK	1.77	75	⋅	⋅	⋅	⋅	22	22	2017	⋅
(Angola)	24	Joana Costa	22	W	1.79	73	⋅	⋅	–	26	24	24	24	2018
(Angola)	⋅	Jocelina Yanda	24	B	1.67	68	⋅	⋅	⋅	⋅	⋅	29	⋅	⋅
(Angola)	⋅	Luísa Kiala	32	B	1.74	58	⋅	⋅	⋅	11	11	→	⋅	⋅
(Angola)	21	Magda Cazanga	27	B	1.72	54	⋅	⋅	21	21	injured	21	21	2018
(Angola)	⋅	Manuela Paulino Nelma	20	B	1.72	72	⋅	⋅	⋅	⋅	9	9	2017	⋅
(Angola)	⋅	Maria Pedro	33	GK	1.72	72	⋅	⋅	16	16	16	⋅	⋅	⋅
(Angola)	11	Marília Quizelete	21	W			⋅	⋅	⋅	⋅	31	31	31	2018
(Angola)	⋅	Marta Santos Martucha	28	W	1.58	64	⋅	⋅	20	20	20	20	2017	⋅
(Angola)	⋅	Matilde André	28	W	1.72	62	⋅	⋅	2	2	⋅	⋅	⋅	⋅
(Angola)	⋅	Maura Galheta	21	W	1.60	60	⋅	⋅	⋅	⋅	3	3	⋅	⋅
(Angola)	⋅	Natália Bernardo	28	B	1.70	57	⋅	⋅	9	9	→	⋅	⋅	⋅
(Angola)	⋅	Natália Kamalandua	18	W	1.65	57	⋅	⋅	⋅	⋅	⋅	6	2017	⋅
(Angola)	⋅	Nelma Pedro	31	B	1.80	82	⋅	⋅	–	⋅	⋅	⋅	⋅	⋅
(Angola)	⋅	Neyde Barbosa	34	GK	1.75	77	⋅	⋅	⋅	1	⋅	⋅	⋅	⋅
(Cameroon)	⋅	Pasma Nchouapougnigni	24	P	1.84	92	⋅	⋅	⋅	28	6	⋅	⋅	⋅
(Angola)	⋅	Patrícia Barros	23	P	1.73	75	⋅	⋅	⋅	17	17	17	⋅	⋅
(Angola)	⋅	Ríssia Oliveira	21	P	1.80	85	⋅	⋅	⋅	16	16	26	2017	⋅
(Angola)	⋅	Sílvia Mulabo	23	W	1.84	61	⋅	⋅	1	⋅	⋅	⋅	⋅	⋅
(Angola)	19	Suzeth Cazanga	26	B	1.80	71	⋅	⋅	19	⋅	⋅	⋅	⋅	2018
(Angola)	1	Teresa Almeida Bá	30	GK	1.81	98	⋅	⋅	12	12	1	1	1	2018
(Angola)	2	Vilma Nenganga	22	B	1.82	68	⋅	⋅	⋅	⋅	2	2	2	2018

=== Former notable players ===
(Angola)	Palmira Barbosa
(Angola)	Marcelina Kiala
(Angola)	Ilda Bengue
(Angola)	Elisa Webba
(Angola)	Filomena Trindade
(Angola)	Justina Praça

=== Former Managers ===
(Angola)	Beto Ferreira		1999
(Angola)	Armando Gomes Culau	1999	2008

== See also ==
- Petro Atlético Football
- Petro Atlético Basketball
- Petro Atlético Roller Hockey
- Federação Angolana de Andebol
