= 2009 African Women's Handball Champions League =

Tournament details
- Host country: Cameroon
- Venue(s): 1 (in 1 host city)
- Dates: October 21–30
- Teams: 8

Final positions
- Champions: (Angola) Petro de Luanda (15th title)
- Runners-up: (Angola) Primeiro de Agosto
- Third place: (Republic of the Congo) Inter Club
- Fourth place: (Ivory Coast) Rombo Sport

The 2009 African Women's Handball Champions League was the 31st edition, organized by the African Handball Confederation, under the auspices of the International Handball Federation, the handball sport governing body. The tournament was held from October 21–30 at the Palais des Sports in Yaoundé, Cameroon, contested by 8 teams and won by Atlético Petróleos de Luanda of Angola.

== Draw ==
Group A	Group B
(Cameroon) FAP Yaoundé (Democratic Republic of the Congo) Mikishi (Angola) Petro de Luanda (Ivory Coast) Rombo Sport	(Democratic Republic of the Congo) HC Héritage (Republic of the Congo) Inter Club (Angola) Primeiro de Agosto (Cameroon) TKC

== Preliminary round ==
Times given below are in WAT UTC+1.

=== Group A ===
Thu, 22 Oct 2009
FAP Yaoundé (Cameroon)	40 : 18	(Democratic Republic of the Congo) Mikishi
Rombo Sport (Ivory Coast)	18 : 41	(Angola) Petro Atlético
Fri, 23 Oct 2009
Petro Atlético (Angola)	44 : 14	(Democratic Republic of the Congo) Mikishi
Rombo Sport (Ivory Coast)	29 : 28	(Cameroon) FAP Yaoundé
Mon, 26 Oct 2009
Mikishi (Democratic Republic of the Congo)	24 : 35	(Ivory Coast) Rombo Sport
Petro Atlético (Angola)	40 : 17	(Cameroon) FAP Yaoundé

Team	Pld	W	D	L	GF	GA	GDIF	Pts
(Angola) Petro Atlético	3	3	0	0	125	49	+76	6
(Ivory Coast) Rombo Sport	3	2	0	1	82	93	-11	4
(Cameroon) FAP Yaoundé	3	1	0	2	85	87	-2	2
(Democratic Republic of the Congo) Mikishi	3	0	0	3	56	119	-63	0

* Note: Advance to semi-finals

=== Group B ===
Wed, 21 Oct 2009
TKC (Cameroon)	32 : 26	(Democratic Republic of the Congo) HC Héritage
1º de Agosto (Angola)	35 : 31	(Republic of the Congo) Inter Club
Fri, 23 Oct 2009
HC Héritage (Democratic Republic of the Congo)	19 : 37	(Angola) 1º de Agosto
Inter Club (Republic of the Congo)	32 : 31	(Cameroon) TKC
Mon, 26 Oct 2009
1º de Agosto (Angola)	24 : 24	(Cameroon) TKC
Inter Club (Republic of the Congo)	36 : 29	(Democratic Republic of the Congo) HC Héritage

Team	Pld	W	D	L	GF	GA	GDIF	Pts
(Angola) 1º de Agosto	3	2	1	0	96	74	+22	5
(Republic of the Congo) Inter Club	3	2	0	1	47	69	-22	4
(Cameroon) TKC	3	1	1	1	57	58	-1	3
(Democratic Republic of the Congo) HC Héritage	3	0	0	3	32	84	-52	0

* Note: Advance to semi-finals

== Knockout stage ==
Championship bracket

Semifinals
Wed 28 Oct 2009
(Angola) Petro Atlético	35
(Republic of the Congo) Inter Club	22
Wed 28 Oct 2009
(Ivory Coast) Rombo Sport	21
(Angola) 1º de Agosto	27

Final
Fri 30 Oct 2009
(Angola) Petro Atlético	29
(Angola) 1º de Agosto	24
Seventh place
Fri 30 Oct 2009
(Republic of the Congo) Inter Club
(Ivory Coast) Rombo Sport

5-8th bracket

5–8th place
Wed 28 Oct 2009
Wed 28 Oct 2009

Fifth place
Thu 29 Oct 2009
Seventh place
Thu 29 Oct 2009

== Final ranking ==
Rank	Team	Record
Gold medal	(Angola) Petro de Luanda	–
Silver medal	(Angola) Primeiro de Agosto	–
Bronze medal	(Republic of the Congo) Inter Club	–
4	(Ivory Coast) Rombo Sport	–
5		–
6		–
7		–
8		–

2009 Africa Women's Handball Champions Cup Winner

Atlético Petróleos de Luanda
15th title
