= 2014 African Women's Handball Champions League =

Tournament details
- Host country: Tunisia
- Venue(s): 5 (in 1 host city)
- Dates: October 9–18
- Teams: 10 (from 1 confederation)

Final positions
- Champions: (Angola) 1º de Agosto (1st title)
- Runners-up: (Angola) Petro Atlético
- Third place: (Angola) Progresso
- Fourth place: (Republic of the Congo) Étoile du Congo

Tournament statistics
- Matches played: 33
- Goals scored: 1,673 (50.7 per match)

The 2014 African Women's Handball Champions League was the 36th edition, organized by the African Handball Confederation, under the auspices of the International Handball Federation, the handball sport governing body. The tournament was held from October 9–18, 2014 in four venues: Salle Beni Khiar, Salle Hammamet, Salle Nabeul and Salle Zouaoui, in Tunis, Tunisia, contested by 10 teams and won by Clube Desportivo Primeiro de Agosto of Angola.

== Draw ==
Group A	Group B
(Ivory Coast) Africa Sports National (Cameroon) FAP Youndé (Democratic Republic of the Congo) Mikishi Lubumbashi (Democratic Republic of the Congo) Nuru Katanga (Angola) Petro de Luanda	(Republic of the Congo) Étoile du Congo (Kenya) Nairobi Water; Phoenix Gabon (Angola) Progresso do Sambizanga (Angola) Primeiro de Agosto

== Preliminary rounds ==
Times given below are in CET UTC+1.

=== Group A ===
Thu, 09 Oct 2014
FAP Yaoundé (Cameroon)	37 (17:10) 17	(Democratic Republic of the Congo) HC Nuru
Africa Sports (Ivory Coast)	33 (18:08) 20	(Democratic Republic of the Congo) Mikishi
Fri, 10 Oct 2014
HC Nuru (Democratic Republic of the Congo)	11 (06:22) 45	(Angola) Petro Atlético
Mikishi (Democratic Republic of the Congo)	26 (12:17) 30	(Cameroon) FAP Yaoundé
Sat, 11 Oct 2014
Mikishi (Democratic Republic of the Congo)	19 (08:21) 33	(Angola) Petro Atlético
FAP Yaoundé (Cameroon)	19 (10:14) 28	(Ivory Coast) Africa Sports
Mon, 13 Oct 2014
Africa Sports (Ivory Coast)	17 (09:13) 29	(Angola) Petro Atlético
HC Nuru (Democratic Republic of the Congo)	21 (09:16) 30	(Democratic Republic of the Congo) Mikishi
Tue, 14 Oct 2014
Africa Sports (Ivory Coast)	29 (06:17) 13	(Democratic Republic of the Congo) HC Nuru
Petro Atlético (Angola)	41 (17:09) 22	(Cameroon) FAP Yaoundé

Team	Pld	W	D	L	GF	GA	GDIF	Pts
(Angola) Petro Atlético	4	4	0	0	148	69	+79	8
(Ivory Coast) Africa Sports	4	3	0	1	107	81	+26	6
(Cameroon) FAP Yaoundé	4	2	0	2	108	112	-4	4
(Democratic Republic of the Congo) Mikishi	4	1	0	3	95	117	-22	2
(Democratic Republic of the Congo) HC Nuru	4	0	0	4	62	141	-79	0

* Note: Advance to quarter-finals
Relegated to 9th place classification

=== Group B ===
Thu, 09 Oct 2014
Étoile du Congo (Republic of the Congo)	36 (17:14) 29	(Kenya) Nairobi Water
Phoenix Gabon	17 (07:11) 24	(Angola) Progresso
Fri, 10 Oct 2014
Étoile du Congo (Republic of the Congo)	23 (12:14) 23	(Angola) Progresso
1º de Agosto (Angola)	35 (18:06) 15	(Kenya) Nairobi Water
Sat, 11 Oct 2014
Étoile du Congo (Republic of the Congo)	28 (15:12) 22	Phoenix Gabon
1º de Agosto (Angola)	32 (14:11) 25	(Angola) Progresso
Mon, 13 Oct 2014
Nairobi Water (Kenya)	17 (10:14) 30	(Angola) Progresso
Phoenix Gabon	12 (06:18) 35	(Angola) 1º de Agosto
Tue, 14 Oct 2014
Nairobi Water (Kenya)	25 (12:07) 20	Phoenix Gabon
1º de Agosto (Angola)	33 (17:13) 27	(Republic of the Congo) Étoile du Congo

Team	Pld	W	D	L	GF	GA	GDIF	Pts
(Angola) 1º de Agosto	4	4	0	0	135	79	+56	8
(Angola) Progresso	4	2	1	1	102	89	+13	6
(Republic of the Congo) Étoile du Congo	4	2	1	1	114	107	+7	4
(Kenya) Nairobi Water	4	1	0	3	86	121	-35	2
Phoenix Gabon	4	0	0	4	71	112	-41	0

* Note: Advance to quarter-finals
Relegated to 9th place classification

== Knockout stage ==
Championship bracket

Quarter-finals
Thu 16 Oct 2014 – 11:30
(Angola) Petro Atlético	38
(Kenya) Nairobi Water	14
Thu 16 Oct 2014 – 11:30
(Angola) 1º de Agosto	43
(Democratic Republic of the Congo) Mikishi	15
Thu 16 Oct 2014 – 14:00
(Angola) Progresso	29
(Cameroon) FAP Yaoundé	19
Thu 16 Oct 2014 – 16:30
(Ivory Coast) Africa Sports	27
(Republic of the Congo) Étoile du Congo	28

Semi-finals
Fri 17 Oct 2014 – 11:30
(Republic of the Congo) Étoile du Congo	19
(Angola) 1º de Agosto	29
Fri 17 Oct 2014 – 14:00
(Angola) Petro Atlético	30
(Angola) Progresso	19

Final
Sat 18 Oct 2014 – 17:00
(Angola) 1º de Agosto	27
(Angola) Petro Atlético	25
Third place
Sat 18 Oct 2014 – 15:00
(Republic of the Congo) Étoile du Congo	25
(Angola) Progresso	28

5-8th bracket

5–8th place
Fri 17 Oct 2014 – 10:00
(Ivory Coast) Africa Sports	31
(Democratic Republic of the Congo) Mikishi	21
Fri 17 Oct 2014 – 12:00
(Kenya) Nairobi Water	26
(Cameroon) FAP Yaoundé	33

Fifth place
Sat 18 Oct 2014 – 10:00
(Ivory Coast) Africa Sports	23
(Cameroon) FAP Yaoundé	28
Seventh place
Sat 18 Oct 2014 – 08:30
(Democratic Republic of the Congo) Mikishi	28
(Kenya) Nairobi Water	31

9th place

Semi-finals

Ninth place
Thu 16 Oct 2014 – 14:00
(Democratic Republic of the Congo) HC Nuru	28
Phoenix Gabon	27
Third place

== Final standings ==
Rank	Team	Record
Gold medal	(Angola) 1º de Agosto	7–0
Silver medal	(Angola) Petro Atlético	6–1
Bronze medal	(Angola) Progresso	4–2
4	(Republic of the Congo) Étoile du Congo	3–3
5	(Cameroon) FAP Yaoundé	4–3
6	(Ivory Coast) Africa Sports	4–3
7	(Kenya) Nairobi Water	2–5
8	(Democratic Republic of the Congo) Mikishi	1–6
9	(Democratic Republic of the Congo) HC Nuru	1–4
10	(Gabon) Phoenix	0–5

2014 Africa Women's Handball Champions Cup Winner

Clube Desportivo Primeiro de Agosto
1st title

== See also ==
2014 African Women's Handball Cup Winners' Cup
