= Albertina Kassoma =

Angolan handball player

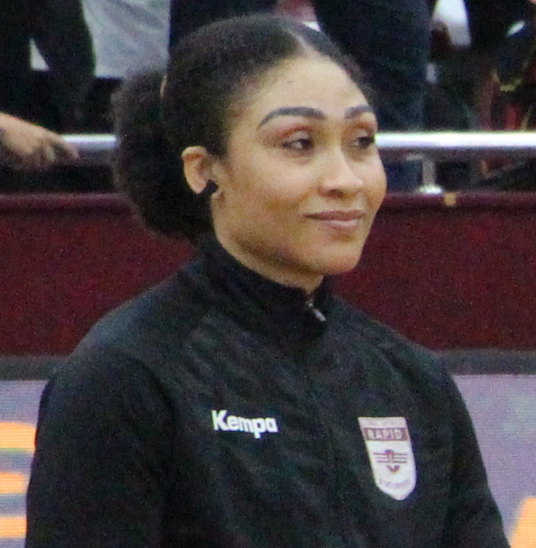

Personal information
- Full name: Albertina da Cruz Kassoma
- Nationality: Angolan
- Born: 12 June 1996 (age 30) Angola
- Height: 1.94 m (6 ft 4 in)

Sport
- Sport: Handball
- Position: Pivot
- Current club: Rapid București
- Number: 10

Senior clubs
- Years: Team
- 2013-2020: C.D. Primeiro de Agosto
- 2020-2021: Rapid București
- 2021-2022: C.D. Primeiro de Agosto
- 2023-: Rapid București
National team
Years	Team	Apps	(Gls)
–	Angola	104	(302)
Medal record
African Championship
Gold medal – first place	2016 Luanda
Gold medal – first place	2018 Brazzaville
Gold medal – first place	2021 Yaoundé
Gold medal – first place	2024 Kinshasa
- Updated on 12 November 2025

Albertina da Cruz Kassoma (born 12 June 1996) is an Angolan handball player for CS Rapid București (handball) and the Angolan national team.

She represented Angola at the 2013 World Women's Handball Championship in Serbia and at the 2016 Summer Olympics.

In 2018, she was named the best player at the African Women's Handball Championship, where Angola also won a gold medal.

== Achievements ==
- Carpathian Trophy:
  - Winner: 2019
- IHF Super Globe
  - Winner: 2019
- African Women's Handball Champions League:
  - Winner: 2014, 2015, 2016, 2017, 2018, 2019, 2022
- African Women's Handball Cup Winners' Cup
  - Winner: 2015, 2016, 2017, 2019
- African Super Cup
  - Winner: 2015, 2016, 2017, 2018, 2019, 2021
- Angolan Championship
  - Winner: 2014, 2015, 2016, 2017, 2019, 2022

== Individual awards ==
- Carpathian Trophy Best Defender: 2019
- 2016 African Championship Best pivot
- 2018 African Championship Best player
- 2018 African Championship Best pivot
- 2021 African Championship Best pivot
