= 2010 African Women's Handball Champions League =

Tournament details
- Host country: Morocco
- Venue(s): 2 (in 1 host city)
- Dates: October 22–30
- Teams: 10

Final positions
- Champions: (Angola) Petro Atlético (16th title)
- Runners-up: (Republic of the Congo) Inter Club
- Third place: (Cameroon) FAP Yaoundé
- Fourth place: (Morocco) US Nouasseur

The 2010 African Handball Champions League was the 32nd edition, organized by the African Handball Confederation, under the auspices of the International Handball Federation, the handball sport governing body. The tournament was held from October 22–30, 2010 at the Complexe Sportif Mohammed V in Casablanca, Morocco, contested by 10 teams and won by Atlético Petróleos de Luanda of Angola.

== Draw ==
Group A	Group B
(Democratic Republic of the Congo) HC Héritage (Republic of the Congo) Inter Club (Angola) Petro de Luanda; Phoenix Gabon (Morocco) US Nouasseur	(Tunisia) ASF Sahel (Cameroon) FAP Yaoundé (Ivory Coast) Rombo Sport (Senegal) Saltigue HC (Democratic Republic of the Congo) Vainqueur

== Preliminary round ==
Times given below are in WET UTC+0.

=== Group A ===
Fri, 22 Oct 2010
Phoenix Gabon	14 : 19	(Morocco) US Nouasseur
Petro Atlético (Angola)	30 : 27	(Republic of the Congo) Inter Club
Sat, 23 Oct 2010
HC Héritage (Democratic Republic of the Congo)	15 : 36	(Angola) Petro Atlético
Inter Club (Republic of the Congo)	27 : 27	Phoenix Gabon
Sun, 24 Oct 2010
Petro Atlético (Angola)	39 : 11	(Morocco) US Nouasseur
HC Héritage (Democratic Republic of the Congo)	23 : 28	(Republic of the Congo) Inter Club
Mon, 25 Oct 2010
Phoenix Gabon	07 : 39	(Angola) Petro Atlético
US Nouasseur (Morocco)	23 : 21	(Democratic Republic of the Congo) HC Héritage
Tue, 26 Oct 2010
Inter Club (Republic of the Congo)	32 : 18	(Morocco) US Nouasseur
Phoenix Gabon	20 : 25	(Democratic Republic of the Congo) HC Héritage

Team	Pld	W	D	L	GF	GA	GDIF	Pts
(Angola) Petro Atlético	4	4	0	0	144	60	+84	8
(Republic of the Congo) Inter Club	4	2	1	1	114	98	+16	5
(Morocco) US Nouasseur	4	2	0	2	71	106	-35	4
(Democratic Republic of the Congo) HC Héritage	4	1	0	3	84	107	-23	2
Phoenix Gabon	4	0	1	3	68	110	-42	1

* Note: Advance to quarter-finals
Relegated to 9th place classification

=== Group B ===
Fri, 22 Oct 2010
Rombo Sport (Ivory Coast)	32 : 24	(Senegal) Saltigue HC
FAP Yaoundé (Cameroon)	33 : 24	(Tunisia) ASF Sahel
Sat, 23 Oct 2010
Vainqueur (Democratic Republic of the Congo)	:	(Ivory Coast) Rombo Sport
Saltigue HC (Senegal)	30 : 27	(Tunisia) ASF Sahel
Sun, 24 Oct 2010
FAP Yaoundé (Cameroon)	40 : 28	(Democratic Republic of the Congo) Vainqueur
ASF Sahel (Tunisia)	25 : 22	(Ivory Coast) Rombo Sport
Mon, 25 Oct 2010
Vainqueur (Democratic Republic of the Congo)	21 : 28	(Tunisia) ASF Sahel
Saltigue HC (Senegal)	25 : 36	(Cameroon) FAP Yaoundé
Tue, 26 Oct 2010
FAP Yaoundé (Cameroon)	31 : 26	(Ivory Coast) Rombo Sport
Vainqueur (Democratic Republic of the Congo)	33 : 40	(Senegal) Saltigue HC

Team	Pld	W	D	L	GF	GA	GDIF	Pts
(Cameroon) FAP Yaoundé	4	4	0	0	140	103	+37	8
(Tunisia) ASF Sahel	4	3	0	1	104	106	-2	6
(Senegal) Saltigue HC	4	2	0	2	119	128	-9	4
(Democratic Republic of the Congo) Vainqueur	4	1	0	3	82	78	+4	2
(Ivory Coast) Rombo Sport **	4	0	0	4	57	109	-52	0

* Note: Advance to quarter-finals
Relegated to 9th place classification
** Penalty for failing to pay participation fees

== Knockout stage ==
Championship bracket

Quarter-finals
Thu 28 Oct 2010 –
(Democratic Republic of the Congo) Vainqueur	15
(Angola) Petro Atlético	41
Thu 28 Oct 2010 –
(Senegal) Saltigue HC	23
(Republic of the Congo) Inter Club	38
Thu 28 Oct 2010 –
(Tunisia) ASF Sahel	26
(Morocco) US Nouasseur	27
Thu 28 Oct 2010 –
(Cameroon) FAP Yaoundé	23
(Democratic Republic of the Congo) HC Héritage	21

Semi-finals
Fri 29 Oct 2010 –
(Republic of the Congo) Inter Club	29
(Cameroon) FAP Yaoundé	18
Fri 29 Oct 2010 –
(Morocco) US Nouasseur	12
(Angola) Petro Atlético	53

Final
Sat 30 Oct 2010 –
(Republic of the Congo) Inter Club	22
(Angola) Petro Atlético	35
Third place
Sat 30 Oct 2010 –
(Cameroon) FAP Yaoundé	36
(Algeria) US Nouasseur	23

5-8th bracket

5–8th place
Thu 28 Oct 2010 -
(Tunisia) ASF Sahel
Thu 28 Oct 2010 -
(Democratic Republic of the Congo) HC Héritage

Fifth place
Fri 29 Oct 2010 –
(Tunisia) ASF Sahel
(Democratic Republic of the Congo) HC Héritage
Seventh place
Fri 29 Oct 2010 –
(Senegal) Saltigue HC
(Democratic Republic of the Congo) Vainqueur

9th place

Thu, 28 Oct 2010
Phoenix Gabon	10 : 0	(Ivory Coast) Rombo Sport

== Final ranking ==
Rank	Team	Record
Gold medal	(Angola) Petro Atlético	–
Silver medal	(Republic of the Congo) Inter Club	–
Bronze medal	(Cameroon) FAP Yaoundé	–
4	(Morocco) US Nouasseur	–
5	(Tunisia) ASF Sahel	–
6	(Democratic Republic of the Congo) HC Héritage	–
7	(Senegal) Saltigue HC	–
8	(Democratic Republic of the Congo) Vainqueur	–
9	Phoenix Gabon	–
10	(Ivory Coast) Rombo Sport	–

2010 Africa Women's Handball Champions Cup Winner

Atlético Petróleos de Luanda
16th title
