= Juliana Machado =

Angolan handball player

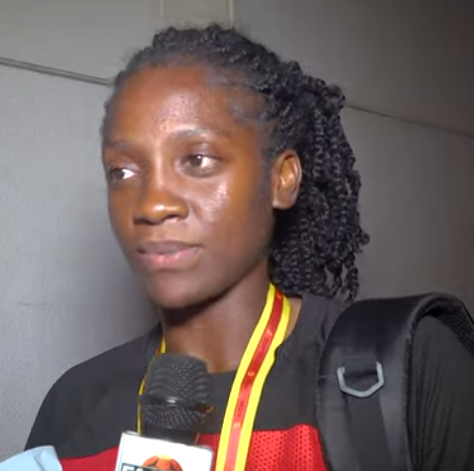
- In a 2024 interview

Personal information
- Full name: Juliana José Machado
- Nationality: Angolan
- Born: 6 November 1994 (age 31) Luanda, Angola
- Height: 1.70 m (5 ft 7 in)

Sport
- Sport: Handball
- Position: Right wing
- Current club: Primeiro de Agosto
- Number: 6
National team
Years	Team	Apps	(Gls)
–	Angola	89	(179)
Medal record
African Championship
Gold medal – first place	Luanda 2016
Gold medal – first place	2021 Yaoundé
Gold medal – first place	2022 Dakar
Gold medal – first place	2024 Kinshasa
- Updated on 10 November 2025

Juliana Machado (born 6 November 1994) is an Angolan handball player for Primeiro de Agosto. She is a member of the Angolan national team.

She competed at the 2015 World Women's Handball Championship in Denmark and at the 2016 Summer Olympics.

== Achievements ==
- Carpathian Trophy:
  - Winner: 2019
