= Carolina Morais =

Angolan handball player

Personal information
- Full name: Carolina Martene Miranda Morais
- Nationality: Angolan
- Born: 13 April 1986 (age 40) Luanda, Angola
- Height: 1.68 m (5 ft 6 in)

Sport
- Sport: Handball
- Position: Right wing
- Current club: Vipers Kristiansand
- Number: 7

Senior clubs
- Years: Team
- –2019: Primeiro de Agosto
- 2019–2021: Vipers Kristiansand
National team
- Years: Team
- –: Angola
Medal record
African Championship
Gold medal – first place	Salé 2012
Gold medal – first place	Luanda 2016
Gold medal – first place	2021 Yaoundé
All-Africa Games
Gold medal – first place	Maputo 2011	Team

Carolina Martene Miranda Morais a.k.a. Carol (born 13 April 1986) is a team handball player from Angola. She plays on the Angola women's national handball team, and participated at the 2011 World Women's Handball Championship in Brazil and the 2012 Summer Olympics in London.

At club level, she played for Norwegian side Vipers Kristiansand, having previously played for Primeiro de Agosto. With Vipers she won the Champions League in 2021 as well as 3 Norwegian Championships in the 3 years she was at the club.

== Achievements ==
- EHF Champions League:
  - Winner: 2020/2021
  - Bronze Medalist: 2018/2019
- Norwegian League:
  - Winner: 2018/2019, 2019/2020, 2020/2021
- Norwegian Cup:
  - Winner: 2019, 2020
