= Liliana Venâncio =

Angolan handball player

Personal information
- Full name: Liliana da Silva Venâncio
- Nationality: Angolan
- Born: 19 September 1995 (age 31) Luanda, Angola
- Height: 1.91 m (6 ft 3 in)

Sport
- Sport: Handball
- Position: Pivot
- Current club: Primeiro de Agosto
- Number: 15
National team
Years	Team	Apps	(Gls)
–	Angola	32	(36)
Medal record
African Championship
Gold medal – first place	2016 Luanda
Gold medal – first place	2018 Brazzaville
Gold medal – first place	2021 Yaoundé
Gold medal – first place	2022 Dakar

Liliana Venâncio (born 19 September 1995) is an Angolan handball player for club Primeiro de Agosto and the Angolan national team.

She competed at the 2015 World Women's Handball Championship in Denmark and at the 2016 Summer Olympics.

== Achievements ==
- Carpathian Trophy:
  - Winner: 2019
