= List of Angola women's national handball team players =

This article aims at showing the evolution of the Angolan women's national handball squad throughout the 1980s, 1990s and 2000s, in the competitions organized by the African Handball Confederation and the International Handball Federation.

== 2011–2019 ==
Angola women's national handball team players 2011–2017 A = African championship winner; G = African games winner; W = World cup; O = Olympic tournament
#	Name	A	P	H	C	V.E.	J.F.	Vivaldo Eduardo						Filipe Cruz		Morten Soubak				F.C.
#	Name	A	P	H	C	2011	2011	2012	2012	2013	2014	2015	2015	2016	2016	2017	2018	2019	2019	2021
#	Name	A	P	H	C	G	W	A	O	W	A	G	W	O	A	W	A	G	W	A
	Acilene Sebastião	24	B	1.73	PET							3								
10	Albertina Kassoma	25	P	1.90	PRI					10	6			16	10	10	10	10	10	2021
	Anastácia Sibo	31	P	1.84	PET			3		3										
35	Azenaide Carlos	31	B	1.75	PET	2011	15	15	15		15	15	15	15	15	15	15	15	35	2021
	Bombo Calandula	29	P	1.76	PET	2011	6	6												
86	Carolina Morais Carol	35	W	1.60	PRI	2011	7	7	7		7				3			3		2021
	Claudete José	21	W	1.74	PRI												3	3		
	Cristina Branco Branca	32	GK	1.70	PRI		16	12	12	20		12	12	12		12	12			
	Dalva Peres	21	W	1.75	PRI							2			32	17				
	Edith Mbunga	27	P	1.78	ASA				RP											
	Elizabeth Cailo Jú	31	W	1.75	PRI							7	7				7			
	Elizabeth Viegas	30	P	1.80	PRI							10	77							
	Elzira Barros	32	B	1.84	PRI	2011	4	4												
8	Helena Paulo Gilda	23	B	1.70	PRI											8	8	8	8	2021
12	Helena Sousa	27	GK	1.90	PRI												1	1	12	2021
	Iracelma Silva	28	B	1.80	PRI											3		13	13	
	Isabel Fernandes Belezura	29	B	1.80	PET	2011	10	10	10		10									
90	Isabel Guialo Belinha	31	B	1.72	KIS	2011	9		9	9	9	9	90	90	90	90	90	90	90	2021
	Janete dos Santos	28	W	1.75	PRO							18	31	31	31	31	31	31	31	
	Joana Costa	22	W	1.79	PET												5			
	Joelma Viegas Cajó	30	W	1.68	PRI	2011	2	2	2	2	2				2					
6	Juliana Machado	27	W	1.70	PRI						3		6	6	6	6		6	23	2021
	Liliana Paixão	25	B	1.82	PET					6										
25	Liliana Venâncio	26	P	1.86	PRI								2	25	25		25		25	2021
	Lisandra Salvador	23	B	1.72	MAR					13										
	Lourena Carlos	28	B	1.73	PRO										4					
	Luisa Kiala	33	B	1.72	PRI	2011	11	11	11	11	11		11	11	11					
	Lurdes Monteiro	31	B	1.70	PRI					8	8	8	8	8	8					
21	Magda Cazanga	30	B	1.84	PET				21	5	5		21	21	21	21	21	21	21	2021
	Manuela Paulino	21	B	1.80	PET											4				
	Marcelina Kiala	35	B	1.80	PET	2011	18	18	18	18	18									
	Maria Pedro	32	GK	1.72	PET	2011				16	16									
5	Marília Quizelete	24			PET															2021
	Marta Alberto	22	GK	1.80	PRI							16				16				
	Marta Santos Martucha	27	W	1.69	PET				20	12	12	4	4							
	Matilde André	29	W	1.72	PRO	2011	13	13				13	13							
	Maura Galheta	20	W	1.60	PET							19								
	Nair Almeida	28	B	1.80	PRI	2011	8	8	8											
9	Natália Bernardo	35	B	1.70	PRI	2011	14	14	14	14	14		9	9	9			9	9	2021
13	Natália Kamalandua	23	W	1.70	PET											13				2021
	Neyde Barbosa	36	GK	1.75	PRO	2011	12	16	1					1	1					
	Odeth Tavares	36	GK	1.70	PRI	2011	1	1												
	Patrícia Barros	19	P	1.73	PET				17											
1	Paulina Silva	21	GK																	2021
	Ríssia Oliveira	22	P	1.80	PET											14				
	Rossana Quitongo Wandy	23	B	1.72	PRI		20	20		4										
4	Ruth João	23	P	1.82	PRI													4	4	2021
20	Stélvia Pascoal	19	B		PET															2021
	Suzete Cazanga	26	B	1.72	PET												14			
16	Teresa Almeida Bá	33	GK	1.82	PET					1	1	1	1	60	16		16	16	16	2021
	Teresa Leite	20	B	1.77	PRI							3								
	Vilma Nenganga	22	B	1.72	PET							6		2	18	2	2			
7	Vilma Silva	24	B	1.70	MAR											7		7	6	2021
17	Wuta Dombaxe	35	B	1.73	PRI						4	17	17	17	17		17	17	17	2021

== 2001–2010 ==
Angola women's national handball team players 2001–2010 A = African championship winner; W = World cup; O = Olympic tournament
Name	A	P	H	Pavel Dzhenev					Jerónimo Neto					V.E.	P. Pereira	
Name	A	P	H	2001	2002	2003	2004	2004	2005	2006	2007	2007	2008	2008	2009	2010
Name	A	P	H	W	A	W	A	O	W	A	G	W	A	O	W	A
Acilene Sebastião	23	B	1.72												17	?
Anastácia Sibo	28	P	1.84												3	3
Anica Neto	33	P	1.81				2004	15	15							
Azenaide Carlos	–	B	1.75											4	15	15
Belina Lariça	28	B	1.78				2004	4	4	4			4			
Bombo Calandula	–	P	1.76		2002	2003			6	6		6	6	6		6
Carolina Morais Carol	–	W	1.60									7			7	7
Cilízia Tavares	25	B	1.76						17	17		17	17			
Conceição Francisco	27	W		14	2002	2003										
Constantina Paulo	26	P	1.80												8	
Cristina Branco Branca	–	GK	1.70						1			16	16		24	12
Dionísia Pio	27	W	1.67				2004	14								
Domingas Cordeiro	25	B		15												
Elisa Webba Lilí	39	P	1.81	9	2002	2003	2004	9								
Elizabeth Cailo Jú	–	W	1.75									15		15		
Elizabeth Viegas	–	P	1.80											17		
Elzira Tavares	–	B	1.84	10	2002	2003		18	18	18			7		4	4
Felicidade Sibo	28	P	1.80										18			
Filomena Trindade Filó	37	W	1.65	5	2002	2003	2004	5	5	5		5	5	5		
Ilda Bengue	34	W	1.78	3	2002	2003	2004	3	3	3		3	3	3		
Inês Jololo	29	W	1.73				2004	7								
Isabel Fernandes Belezura	–	W	1.80			2003	2004	10	10	10		10	10	10		10
Ivone Mufuca †	31	-		4	2002	2003										
Joelma Viegas Cajó	–	W	1.68												2	2
Justina Praça Titina	26	GK	1.76	12	2002	2003			16	16						
Luisa Kiala	–	B	1.72		2002	2003	2004	11		13		13	13	13	11	11
Lurdes Monteiro	–	B	1.70						19						12	18
Marcelina Kiala	–	B	1.80	11	2002	2003	2004		11	11		11	11			
Maria Gonçalves	29	-	1.74	7	2002				7							
Maria Pedro	–	GK	1.72		2002	2003	2004	16	12	12		12	12	12	16	16
Matilde André	–	W	1.72												5	
Nair Almeida	–	B	1.80	8	2002	2003	2004	8	8	8		8	8	8		
Natália Bernardo	–	B	1.70									14	14	14	14	14
Nelma Pedro	30	P	1.80												13	20
Neyde Barbosa	–	GK	1.75				2004	12								
Odeth Tavares	–	GK	1.70	1	2002	2003	2004	1				1	1	1	1	1
Rosa Amaral	27	P	1.80	6	2002	2003	2004	6				9				
Mária Eduardo	35	W	1.78	2	2002	2003			2	2		2	2	2		
Teresa Tchiwengue	19	-		16												
Teresa Ulundo Chinha	30	-		13												
Wuta Dombaxe	–	B	1.73											9	9	13

== 1991–2000 ==
Angola women's national handball team players 1991–2000 A = African championship; A = African championship winner; W = World cup; O = Olympic tournament
Name	A	P	H	Beto Ferreira										Jerónimo Neto			
Name	A	P	H	1991	1992	1993	1994	1995	1995	1996	1996	1997	1998	1999	1999	2000	2000
Name	A	P	H	A	A	W	A	G	W	O	A	W	A	G	W	A	O
Ana Ramos	-	-											1998				
Anabela Joaquim	29	-								1996							
Anica Neto	–	P	1.81							1996			1998				2000
Conceição Cordeiro	-	-											1998				
Conceição Saiago	-	-											1998				
Domingas Cordeiro	–	B								1996							2000
Elisa Peres	33	GK								1996							
Elisa Webba Lilí	–	P	1.81							1996			1998				2000
Felisbela Teixeira Belinha	-	-											1998				
Filomena Trindade Filó	–	W	1.65							1996			1998				2000
Ilda Bengue	–	W	1.78										1998				2000
Inês Jololo	–	W	1.73										1998				2000
Ivone Mufuca †	–	-											1998				2000
Justina Praça Titina	–	GK	1.76							1996							2000
Lia Paulo	21	B								1996							
Luzia Bezerra	28	-								1996							
Marcelina Kiala	–	B	1.80										1998				2000
Maria Gonçalves	–	-	1.74							1996			1998				
Maria Vanga	-	-											1998				
Maura Faial	30	-								1996							2000
Odeth Tavares	–	GK	1.70														2000
Palmira Barbosa	35	B								1996			1998				
Regina Camumbila	30	-															2000
Rosa Torres Rosita	-	GK								1996							
Mária Eduardo	–	W	1.78							1996			1998				
Teresa Ulundo Chinha	–	-											1998				2000

== 1981–1990 ==
Angola women's national handball team players 1981–1990 A = African championship; A = African championship winner
Name	A	P	H	Norberto Baptista			Beto Ferreira		
Name	A	P	H	1981	1983	1985	1987	1989	1990
Name	A	P	H	A	A	A	A	A	W
Ana Balbina Ceita Bininha	25	LW	1.61		1983	1985		1989	
Ana Beatriz Ceita Bibia	25	CB	1.62			1985		1989	
Ana Paula	27	RW		1981	1983	1985		1989	
Anabela Joaquim	–	W						1989	
Bernardeth Sá Bida		GK	1.70	1981	1983	1985		1989	
Carla Sequeira		CB	1.67			1985			
Cesaltina Ceita Butina		RW	1.62			1985		1989	
Chinha		-			1983				
Elisa Peres	–	GK						1989	
Elisa Webba Lilí	–	P	1.81					1989	
Elizabeth Bondo		B		1981	1983				
Fábia Raposo	24	B	1.69			1985		1989	
Felisbela Teixeira Belinha		LW	1.59			1985			
Graça Bandeira		P	1.70		1983	1985		1989	
Hermínia Coelho		GK	1.69	1981	1983	1985			
Liliana Mesquita		P	1.67	1981	1983	1985		1989	
Lourdes Pereira		P	1.62		1983				
Luzia Bezerra Prazeres	–	B						1989	
Manuela Silva		-			1983				
Maria José	–	-	1.78	1981					
Marisa Costa		-			1983				
Maura Faial	–	B						1989	
Palmira Barbosa Mirita	–	B	1.70	1981	1983	1985		1989	
Belita		GK						1989	
Luisinha		B						1989	
Rosa Serqueira Rosinha		B	1.73		1983	1985			

== See also ==
- Angola Women's Handball League
- Federação Angolana de Andebol
- List of Angola international footballers
- List of Angola national basketball team players
