= Angola at the 1996 Summer Olympics =

- IOC code: ANG
- NOC: Angolan Olympic Committee
- Website: www.comiteolimpicoangolano.com

in Atlanta
- Competitors: 28 (13 men, 15 women) in 5 sports
- Flag bearer: Palmira de Almeida
- Medals: Gold 0 Silver 0 Bronze 0 Total 0

Summer Olympics appearances (overview)
- 1980; 1984; 1988; 1992; 1996; 2000; 2004; 2008; 2012; 2016; 2020; 2024

Angola was represented at the 1996 Summer Olympics in Atlanta, Georgia, United States by the Angolan Olympic Committee.

In total, 28 athletes including 13 men and 15 woman represented Angola in five different sports including athletics, basketball, handball, shooting and swimming.

== Competitors ==
In total, 28 athletes represented Angola at the 1996 Summer Olympics in Atlanta, Georgia, United States across five different sports.

| Sport | Men | Women | Total |
|---|---|---|---|
| Athletics | 1 | 1 | 2 |
| Basketball | 11 | 0 | 11 |
| Handball | 0 | 13 | 13 |
| Shooting | 1 | 0 | 1 |
| Swimming | 0 | 1 | 1 |
| Total | 13 | 15 | 28 |

== Athletics ==
In total, two Angolan athletes participated in the athletics events – Guilhermina Cruz in the women's 200 m and the women's 400 m and João N'Tyamba in the men's 1,500 m.

The heats for the women's 400 m took place on 26 July 1996. Cruz finished seventh in her heat in a time of 55.42 seconds. She did not advance to the quarter-finals.

The heats for the men's 1,500 m took place on 29 July 1996. N'Tyamba finished ninth in his heat in a time of three minutes 46.41 seconds. He did not advance to the semi-finals.

The heats for the women's 200 m took place on 31 July 1996. Cruz finished seventh in her heat in a time of 24.92 seconds. She did not advance to the quarter-finals.

| Athletes | Events | Heat Round 1 | | Heat Round 2 | | Semifinal | | Final | |
| Athletes | Events | Time | Rank | Time | Rank | Time | Rank | Time | Rank |
|---|---|---|---|---|---|---|---|---|---|
| Guilhermina Cruz | women's 200 m | 24.92 | 43 | Did not advance | | | | | |
| Guilhermina Cruz | women's 400 m | 55.42 | 45 | Did not advance | | | | | |
| João N'Tyamba | men's 1,500 m | 3:46.41 | 44 | N/A | | Did not advance | | | |

== Basketball ==
In total, 11 Angolan athletes participated in the basketball – Victor de Carvalho, Herlander Coimbra, David Dias, José Guimarães, Aníbal Moreira, Benjamim João Romano, Honorato Trosso, Benjamim Ucuahamba, Angelo Victoriano, Edmar Victoriano and Justino Victoriano in the men's tournament.

The preliminary round for the men's basketball tournament took place from 20–28 July 1996. Angloa finished sixth in pool A after losing all of their preliminary round matches. In the classification round on 30 July 1996, they lost to Puerto Rico but recorded their only win of the competition in the 11th-place play-off on 2 August 1996 against South Korea.

Preliminary round

| Pos | Team | Pld | W | L | PF | PA | PD | Pts | Qualification |
|---|---|---|---|---|---|---|---|---|---|
| 1 | United States (H) | 5 | 5 | 0 | 522 | 345 | +177 | 10 | Quarterfinals |
| 2 | Lithuania | 5 | 3 | 2 | 427 | 354 | +73 | 8 (Note: Head-to-head record: Lithuania 1–0 Croatia) | Quarterfinals |
| 3 | Croatia | 5 | 3 | 2 | 422 | 386 | +36 | 8 | Quarterfinals |
| 4 | China | 5 | 2 | 3 | 360 | 502 | −142 | 7 (Note: Head-to-head record: China 1–0 Argentina) | Quarterfinals |
| 5 | Argentina | 5 | 2 | 3 | 351 | 396 | −45 | 7 | 9th place playoff |
| 6 | Angola | 5 | 0 | 5 | 280 | 379 | −99 | 5 | 11th place playoff |

Source: FIBA archive
Rules for classification: 1) points; 2) head-to-head points; 3) head-to-head goal average; 4) head-to-head number of points scored.
(H) Hosts
Notes:

20 July 1996

Report

| China | 70–67 | Angola |
Scoring by half: 36–36, 34–31
| Pts: Wang 17; Rebs: Wang 11; Asts: Hu 3 | | Pts: Â. Victoriano, Carvalho 13; Rebs: Â. Victoriano 6 Asts: Avô 5 |

Atlanta
Referees: Jose Piovesan Neto (BRA), Juan Brea Diaz (CUB)

22 July 1996

Report

| Angola | 54–87 | United States |
Scoring by half: 31–44, 23–43
| Pts: Carvalho 16; Rebs: Dias 5 Asts: Avô 5 | | Pts: Malone 12; Rebs: Barkley 9 Asts: Barkley 7 |

Atlanta
Referees: Michael Butler (AUS), Tomislav Jovancic (YUG)

24 July 1996

Report

| Croatia | 71–48 | Angola |
Scoring by half: 26–23, 45–25
| Pts: Rađa 20; Rebs: Rađa 9 Asts: Kukoč 6 | | Pts: Â. Victoriano, Dias 10; Rebs: Dias 12; Asts: Avô 2 |

Atlanta
Referees: Hidetoshi Ishida (JPN), Serguei Boulanov (RUS)

26 July 1996

Report

| Angola | 49–85 | Lithuania |
Scoring by half: 21–37, 28–48
| Pts: Â. Victoriano 18; Rebs: Moreira Dias 6 Asts: Carvalho 4 | | Pts: Karnišovas 20; Rebs: Sabonis 10; Asts: Sabonis 8 |

Atlanta
Referees: Jose Pelissari (BRA), Robert Barnett (AUS)

28 July 1996

Report

| Argentina | 66–62 | Angola |
Scoring by half: 27–32, 39–30
| Pts: Espil 21; Rebs: Villar 6 Asts: Osella 5 | | Pts: Dias 17; Rebs: Moreira Dias 7 Asts: Avô 4 |

Atlanta
Referees: Wieslaw Zych (POL), Chong Kyoung (KOR)

Classification round 9th-12th

30 July 1996
17:00

Report

| Puerto Rico | 76–67 | Angola |
Scoring by half: 38–36, 38–31
| Pts: Ortiz 19; Rebs: Rivas 7 Asts: Alicea 5 | | Pts: Moreira 15; Rebs: Dias 11; Asts: Moreira 6 |

Atlanta
Referees: Roman Ryzhyk (UKR), Jose Reyes Ronfini (MEX)

11th-place play-off

2 August 1996
10:00

Report

| South Korea | 61–99 | Angola |
Scoring by half: 33–48, 28–51
| Pts: D. H. Kang 17; Rebs: H. C. Chun 5 Asts: S. M. Lee, D. H. Kang 6 | | Pts: Dias 27; Rebs: Dias 11; Asts: Moreira 5 |

Atlanta
Referees: Jose Reyes Ronfini (MEX), Juan Brea Diaz (CUB)

== Handball ==
In total, 13 Angolan athletes participated in the handball – Palmira Barbosa, Luzia Bizerra, Domingas Cordeiro, Maria Eduardo, Maura Faial, Maria Gonçalves, Anabela Joaquim, Anica Neto, Lia Paulo, Elisa Peres, Justina Praça, Filomena Trindade and Elisa Webba in the women's tournament.

The preliminary round for the women's handball tournament took place from 26–30 July 1996. Angloa finished fourth in pool B after losing all of their preliminary round matches. In the seventh-place play-off on 1 August 1996, they recorded their only win of the competition against the hosts, the United States.

Preliminary group B

| Team | Pld | W | D | L | GF | GA | GD | Points |
|---|---|---|---|---|---|---|---|---|
| South Korea | 3 | 3 | 0 | 0 | 83 | 60 | +23 | 6 |
| Norway | 3 | 2 | 0 | 1 | 79 | 66 | +13 | 4 |
| Germany | 3 | 1 | 0 | 2 | 70 | 73 | -3 | 2 |
| Angola | 3 | 0 | 0 | 3 | 49 | 82 | -23 | 0 |

| 26 July; 10:00 | Norway | 30–18 | Angola |

| 28 July; 10:00 | South Korea | 25–19 | Angola |

| 30 July; 10:00 | Germany | 27–12 | Angola |

7th-place play-off

| 1 August; 10:00 | Angola | 24–23 | United States |

== Shooting ==
In total, one Angolan athlete participated in the shooting events – Paulo Morais in the men's trap.

The preliminary round for the men's trap took place on 20 July 1996. Morais scored 115 points in the preliminary round. He did not advance to the final round and finished joint 45th overall.

| Athlete | Events | Qualification | | Final | |
| Athlete | Events | Score | Rank | Score | Rank |
|---|---|---|---|---|---|
| Paulo Morais | Trap | 115 | 45 | Did not advance | |

== Swimming ==
In total, one Angolan athlete participated in the swimming events – Nádia Cruz in the women's 100 m breaststroke and the women's 200 m breaststroke.

The heats for the women's 100 m breaststroke took place on 21 July 1996. Cruz finished seventh in her heat in a time of one minute 16.62 seconds which was ultimately not fast enough to qualify for the finals.

The heats for the women's 200 m breaststroke took place on 23 July 1996. Cruz finished fifth in her heat in a time of two minutes 44.24 seconds which was ultimately not fast enough to qualify for the finals.

| Athletes | Events | Heat | | Finals | |
| Athletes | Events | Time | Rank | Time | Rank |
|---|---|---|---|---|---|
| Nádia Cruz | 100 m breaststroke | 1:16.62 | 43 | Did not advance | |
| Nádia Cruz | 200 m breaststroke | 2:44.24 | 37 | Did not advance | |

== See also ==
- Angola at the 1996 Summer Paralympics
