= Angola at the 2000 Summer Olympics =

- IOC code: ANG
- NOC: Angolan Olympic Committee
- Website: www.comiteolimpicoangolano.com

in Sydney
- Competitors: 30 in 5 sports
- Flag bearer: Nádia Cruz
- Medals: Gold 0 Silver 0 Bronze 0 Total 0

Summer Olympics appearances (overview)
- 1980; 1984; 1988; 1992; 1996; 2000; 2004; 2008; 2012; 2016; 2020; 2024; 2028

Angola competed at the 2000 Summer Olympics in Sydney, Australia.

== Competitors ==
The following is the list of number of competitors in the Games.

Sport	Men	Women	Total
Athletics	1	1	2
Basketball	12	0	12
Handball	0	13	13
Shooting	1	0	1
Swimming	1	1	2
Total	15	15	30

== Athletics ==
Men's marathon

Key

- Note–Ranks given for track events are within the athlete's heat only
- Q = Qualified for the next round by position in race or, in field events, by achieving the automatic qualification target
- q = Qualified for the next round as a fastest loser or, in field events, by position without achieving the qualifying target

Men
Track and road events

Athlete	Event	Heat		Quarterfinal		Semifinal		Final	
Athlete	Event	Time	Rank	Time	Rank	Time	Rank	Time	Rank
João N'Tyamba	Marathon	—N/a						2:16:43	17

Women
Track and road events

Athlete	Event	Heat		Quarterfinal		Semifinal		Final	
Athlete	Event	Time	Rank	Time	Rank	Time	Rank	Time	Rank
Delfina Cassinda	800 m	2:15.02	7	—N/a		Did not advance			

== Basketball ==
=== Men ===
Roster

- Victor Muzadi
- Anibal Moreira
- Angelo Victoriano
- Garcia Domingos
- Edmar Victoriano
- Victor Carvalho
- Herlander Coimbra
- Belarmino Mario Chipongue
- David Bartolomeu Dias
- Carlos Bendinha de Almeida
- Miguel Pontes Lutonda
- Buila Katiavala

Preliminary round

Pos	Team	Pld	W	L	PF	PA	PD	Pts	Qualification
1	Canada	5	4	1	433	373	+60	9 (Note: Head-to-head record: Canada 1–0 FR Yugoslavia)	Quarterfinals
2	(Federal Republic of Yugoslavia) FR Yugoslavia	5	4	1	372	338	+34	9	Quarterfinals
3	Australia (H)	5	3	2	408	407	+1	8 (Note: Head-to-head record: Australia 1-0 Russia)	Quarterfinals
4	Russia	5	3	2	367	328	+39	8	Quarterfinals
5	Spain	5	1	4	349	376	−27	6	9th place playoff
6	Angola	5	0	5	303	410	−107	5	11th place playoff

Source: FIBA archive
Rules for classification: 1) points; 2) head-to-head points; 3) head-to-head goal average; 4) head-to-head number of points scored.
(H) Hosts
Notes:

17 September
19:30

Spain	64–45	Angola
Scoring by half: 30–22, 34–23
Pts: Dueñas 13; Rebs: Reyes 15; Asts: Reyes, Rodríguez 3 each		Pts: Muzadi 13; Rebs: Dias, E. Victoriano 7 each Asts: Lutonda 2

The Dome, Sydney

19 September
9:30

Canada	99–54	Angola
Scoring by half: 50–29, 49–25
Pts: Barrett 21; Rebs: Swords 7 Asts: Nash, Swords 5 each		Pts: de Carvalho 10; Rebs: A. Victoriano 7 Asts: Lutonda 3

The Dome, Sydney

21 September
19:30

FR Yugoslavia (Federal Republic of Yugoslavia)	73–64	Angola
Scoring by half: 39–32, 34–32
Pts: Tomašević 17; Rebs: Tomašević 11; Asts: Lukovski 4		Pts: Chipongue 15; Rebs: Lutonda 6 Asts: Lutonda 6

The Dome, Sydney
Attendance: 8,391

23 September
16:30

Angola	75–86	Australia
Scoring by half: 43–41, 32–45
Pts: Dias 18; Rebs: Lutonda 7 Asts: 3 players, 3 each		Pts: Gaze 18; Rebs: Bradtke 7 Asts: Mackinnon 6

The Dome, Sydney
Attendance: 8,446

25 September
9:30

Angola	65–88	Russia
Scoring by half: 35–45, 30–43
Pts: Dias 14; Rebs: Dias 6 Asts: E. Victoriano 3		Pts: Morgunov 17; Rebs: Kirilenko 9 Asts: Bazarevich, E. Pashutin 5 each

The Dome, Sydney
Attendance: 8,435

Classification Round

26 September
14:30

11th place

New Zealand	70–60	Angola
Scoring by half: 37–26, 33–34
Pts: Penney 17; Rebs: Marks 11; Asts: Jones 3		Pts: Almeida 19; Rebs: Dias 5 Asts: Lutonda 3

The Dome, Sydney
Attendance: 8,395

== Handball ==
=== Women ===
Roster

- Ilda Bengue
- Regina Camumbila
- Domingas Cordeiro
- Maura Faial
- Maria Jololo
- Marcelina Kiala
- Ivone Mufuca
- Anica Neto
- Justina Praça
- Maria Raimundo
- Maria Tavares
- Filomena Trindade
- Teresa Ulundo
- Elisa Webba

Groupplay

Pos	Team	Pld	W	D	L	GF	GA	GD	Pts	Qualification
1	South Korea	4	4	0	0	131	100	+31	8	Quarterfinals
2	Hungary	4	2	1	1	119	106	+13	5	Quarterfinals
3	France	4	2	0	2	90	93	−3	4	Quarterfinals
4	Romania	4	1	1	2	99	101	−2	3	Quarterfinals
5	Angola	4	0	0	4	98	137	−39	0	Ninth place game

17 September 2000; 14:30	Hungary	42–22	Angola	Pavilion 2, Sydney; Referees: Tomaszewski, Adams (AUS)
17 September 2000; 14:30	Radulović 11	(18–13)	Bengue 8	Pavilion 2, Sydney; Referees: Tomaszewski, Adams (AUS)
17 September 2000; 14:30	2× (yellow card) 2× (suspension)		3× (yellow card) 8× (suspension)	Pavilion 2, Sydney; Referees: Tomaszewski, Adams (AUS)

21 September 2000; 16:30	Angola	25–34	Romania	Pavilion 2, Sydney; Referees: Bojsen, Anusic (USA)
21 September 2000; 16:30	Bengue 11	(11–16)	Dobrin 10	Pavilion 2, Sydney; Referees: Bojsen, Anusic (USA)
21 September 2000; 16:30	2× (yellow card) 6× (suspension)		3× (yellow card) 10× (suspension) 1× (red card)	Pavilion 2, Sydney; Referees: Bojsen, Anusic (USA)

23 September 2000; 14:30	Angola	27–29	France	Pavilion 2, Sydney; Referees: Marić, Gardinovački (FRY)
23 September 2000; 14:30	Bengue 7	(11–16)	Pecqueux-Rolland 7	Pavilion 2, Sydney; Referees: Marić, Gardinovački (FRY)
23 September 2000; 14:30	3× (yellow card) 6× (suspension)		3× (yellow card) 4× (suspension) 1× (red card)	Pavilion 2, Sydney; Referees: Marić, Gardinovački (FRY)

25 September 2000; 16:30	South Korea	31–24	Angola	Pavilion 2, Sydney; Referees: Tomaszewski, Adams (AUS)
25 September 2000; 16:30	Kim H. 6	(14–16)	Bengue 10	Pavilion 2, Sydney; Referees: Tomaszewski, Adams (AUS)
25 September 2000; 16:30	3× (yellow card) 2× (suspension)		2× (yellow card) 1× (suspension)	Pavilion 2, Sydney; Referees: Tomaszewski, Adams (AUS)

Ninth place game

28 September 2000; 12:30	Angola	26–18	Australia	The Dome, Sydney; Referees: Salim, Hassan (EGY)
28 September 2000; 12:30	Mufuca 9	(12–6)	Edland 6	The Dome, Sydney; Referees: Salim, Hassan (EGY)
28 September 2000; 12:30	3× (yellow card) 4× (suspension)		3× (yellow card) 3× (suspension) 1× (red card)	The Dome, Sydney; Referees: Salim, Hassan (EGY)

== Shooting ==
Men

Athlete	Event	Qualification		Final		Total	
Athlete	Event	Points	Rank	Points	Rank	Points	Rank
João Paulo de Silva	Trap	99	41	Did not advance			

== Swimming ==
Men

Athlete	Event	Heat		Semifinal		Final	
Athlete	Event	Time	Rank	Time	Rank	Time	Rank
Joao Aguiar	50 m freestyle	25.70	63	Did not advance			

Women

Athlete	Event	Heat		Semifinal		Final	
Athlete	Event	Time	Rank	Time	Rank	Time	Rank
Nádia Cruz	100 m breaststroke	1:19.57	39	Did not advance			

== See also ==
- Angola at the 2000 Summer Paralympics
