= Angola at the 2004 Summer Olympics =

- IOC code: ANG
- NOC: Angolan Olympic Committee
- Website: www.comiteolimpicoangolano.com

in Athens
- Competitors: 30 in 5 sports
- Flag bearer: Angelo Victoriano
- Medals: Gold 0 Silver 0 Bronze 0 Total 0

Summer Olympics appearances (overview)
- 1980; 1984; 1988; 1992; 1996; 2000; 2004; 2008; 2012; 2016; 2020; 2024

Angola competed at the 2004 Summer Olympics in Athens, Greece from 13 to 29 August 2004.

== Athletics ==
Angolan athletes have so far achieved qualifying standards in the following athletics events (up to a maximum of 3 athletes in each event at the 'A' Standard, and 1 at the 'B' Standard):

Key

- Note–Ranks given for track events are within the athlete's heat only
- Q = Qualified for the next round
- q = Qualified for the next round as a fastest loser or, in field events, by position without achieving the qualifying target
- NR = National record
- N/A = Round not applicable for the event
- Bye = Athlete not required to compete in round

Men

Athlete	Event	Final	
Athlete	Event	Result	Rank
João N'Tyamba	Marathon	2:23:56	53

Women

Athlete	Event	Heat		Semifinal		Final	
Athlete	Event	Result	Rank	Result	Rank	Result	Rank
Rosa Saul	1500 m	DNS		did not advance			

== Basketball ==
Angola has qualified a men's team.

- Men's team event – 1 team of 12 players

=== Men's tournament ===
Roster

The following is the Angola roster in the men's basketball tournament of the 2004 Summer Olympics.

Angola men's national basketball team – 2004 Summer Olympics roster
Players
Coaches

Pos.	No.	Name	Age – Date of birth	Height	Club	Ctr.
F	4	Olimpio Cipriano	22 – 9 April 1982	1.92 m (6 ft 4 in)	Primeiro de Agosto	(Angola)
G	5	Walter Costa	31 – 25 March 1973	1.85 m (6 ft 1 in)	Primeiro de Agosto	(Angola)
F/C	6	Angelo Victoriano (C)	36 – 8 February 1968	1.96 m (6 ft 5 in)	Primeiro de Agosto	(Angola)
F	7	Gerson Monteiro	31 – 12 July 1973	1.90 m (6 ft 3 in)	Petróleos Luanda	(Angola)
F	8	Edmar Victoriano	28 – 10 November 1975	1.95 m (6 ft 5 in)	Primeiro de Agosto	(Angola)
F	9	Victor de Carvalho	35 – 20 February 1969	1.93 m (6 ft 4 in)	Petróleos Luanda	(Angola)
F/C	10	Joaquim Gomes	23 – 23 December 1980	2.00 m (6 ft 7 in)	Valparaiso Crusaders	(United States)
F/C	11	Victor Muzadi	26 – 22 June 1978	2.01 m (6 ft 7 in)	Primeiro de Agosto	(Angola)
C	12	Abdel Moussa	24 – 8 April 1980	2.02 m (6 ft 8 in)	Primeiro de Agosto	(Angola)
G/F	13	Carlos Almeida	27 – 24 September 1976	1.92 m (6 ft 4 in)	Primeiro de Agosto	(Angola)
G	14	Miguel Lutonda	32 – 24 December 1971	1.86 m (6 ft 1 in)	Primeiro de Agosto	(Angola)
F/C	15	Eduardo Mingas	25 – 29 January 1979	1.96 m (6 ft 5 in)	Interclube	(Angola)

Head coach

- (Portugal) Mário Palma

Assistant coach(es)

- (Angola) Raúl Duarte
- (Angola) Jaime Covilhã

Legend

- (C) Team captain
- nat field describes country
  of last club
  before the tournament
- Age as of August 13, 2004

Group play

Pos	Team	Pld	W	L	PF	PA	PD	Pts	Qualification
1	Lithuania	5	5	0	468	414	+54	10	Quarterfinals
2	Greece	5	3	2	389	343	+46	8 (Note: Head-to-head record: Greece 1–1 (1.10 GAvg), Puerto Rico 1–1 (0.99), United States 1–1 (0.92))	Quarterfinals
3	Puerto Rico	5	3	2	410	411	−1	8	Quarterfinals
4	United States	5	3	2	418	389	+29	8	Quarterfinals
5	Australia	5	1	4	383	411	−28	6	9th place playoff
6	Angola	5	0	5	321	421	−100	5	11th place playoff

Source: FIBA archive
Rules for classification: 1) points; 2) head-to-head points; 3) head-to-head goal average; 4) head-to-head number of points scored.
Notes:

15 August 2004
9:00

Angola	73–78	Lithuania
Scoring by quarter: 24–14, 8–14, 23–28, 18–22
Pts: Lutonda 17; Rebs: Lutonda 4 Asts: Lutonda 6		Pts: Lavrinovič, E. Žukauskas 15 each Rebs: E. Žukauskas 11; Asts: Jasikevičius 6

Helliniko Indoor Arena, Athens
Attendance: 400
Referees: Chantal Julien (FRA), Ma Li Jun (CHN)

17 August 2004
11:15

Australia	83–59	Angola
Scoring by quarter: 21–13, 24–16, 27–15, 11–15
Pts: Heal 18; Rebs: Bogut 11; Asts: Smith 3		Pts: Monteiro 18; Rebs: Gomes 9 Asts: 4 players, 1 each

Helliniko Indoor Arena, Athens
Attendance: 2,400
Referees: Renato Santos (BRA), Vladimir Okhrimenko (RUS)

19 August 2004
16:45

Puerto Rico	83–80	Angola
Scoring by quarter: 19–17, 18–15, 26–34, 20–14
Pts: Ayuso 17; Rebs: Santiago 10; Asts: Arroyo 6		Pts: de Carvalho 14; Rebs: Moussa 6 Asts: Costa 7

Helliniko Indoor Arena, Athens
Attendance: 12,000
Referees: Reynaldo Sanchez (DOM), Ma Li Jun (CHN)

21 August 2004
22:15

Angola	56–88	Greece
Scoring by quarter: 15–23, 10–20, 10–24, 21–21
Pts: Costa 12; Rebs: Costa 5 Asts: 5 players, 1 each		Pts: Dikoudis 15; Rebs: Dikoudis, Papadopoulos 8 each Asts: Diamantidis 3

Helliniko Indoor Arena, Athens
Attendance: 12,000
Referees: Mike Homsy (CAN), Alejandro Chiti (ARG)

23 August 2004
14:30

United States	89–53	Angola
Scoring by quarter: 23–14, 23–12, 29–13, 14–14
Pts: Duncan 15; Rebs: Boozer 9 Asts: James 5		Pts: Monteiro 20; Rebs: Gomes 6 Asts: Monteiro, Moussa 2 each

Helliniko Indoor Arena, Athens
Attendance: 12,000
Referees: Pablo Estevez (ARG), Philippe Leemann (SUI)

Classification round (11th–12th place)

24 August 2004
14:30

11th place

Serbia and Montenegro	85–62	Angola
Scoring by quarter: 18–10, 16–15, 27–19, 24–18
Pts: Šćepanović 18; Rebs: Krstić 12; Asts: Šćepanović 4		Pts: Monteiro 26; Rebs: Moussa 7 Asts: Almeida, Monteiro 2 each

Helliniko Indoor Arena, Athens
Attendance: 3,625
Referees: Vicente Bulto (ESP), Alejandro Chiti (ARG)

== Handball ==
=== Women's tournament ===
Roster

The following is the Angola roster in the women's handball tournament of the 2004 Summer Olympics.

Head coaches: Pavel Dzhenev

No.	Pos.	Name	Date of birth (age)	Height	App.	Goals	Club
1	GK	Odete Tavares	18 August 1976 (aged 27)	1.72 m	56	0	(Angola) 1º de Agosto
3	LB	Ilda Bengue	30 October 1974 (aged 29)	1.78 m	98	402	(France) Cercle Dijon Bourgogne
4	CB	Belina Larica	11 February 1980 (aged 24)	1.76 m	5	11	(Angola) Petro Atlético
5	RW	Filomena Trinidade	26 September 1971 (aged 32)	1.64 m	125	455	(Angola) Petro Atlético
6	P	Rosa Amaral	21 June 1980 (aged 24)	1.75 m	33	39	(Angola) Petro Atlético
7	LW	Ines Jololo	30 November 1975 (aged 28)	1.80 m	54	110	(Angola) 1º de Agosto
8	LB	Nair Almeida	23 January 1984 (aged 20)	1.80 m	28	70	(Angola) Enana
9	P	Lili Torres	24 May 1969 (aged 35)	1.81 m	133	247	(Angola) Petro Atlético
10	LW	Isabel Fernandes	5 June 1985 (aged 19)	1.81 m	13	23	(Angola) Petro Atlético
11	CB	Luisa Kiala	25 January 1982 (aged 22)	1.79 m	22	47	(Angola) Petro Atlético
12	GK	Neyde Barbosa	23 September 1980 (aged 23)	1.75 m	6	0	(Angola) Enana
14	RW	Dionisia Pio	10 February 1977 (aged 27)	1.67 m	5	4	(Spain) El Ferrobus Mislata
15	P	Anica Neto	27 December 1972 (aged 31)	1.81 m	70	50	(Angola) 1º de Agosto
16	GK	Maria Pedro	29 December 1982 (aged 21)	1.73 m	12	0	(Angola) Petro Atlético
18	LB	Elzira Tavares	13 May 1980 (aged 24)	1.84 m	16	32	(Angola) Enana

Group play

Pos	Team	Pld	W	D	L	GF	GA	GD	Pts	Qualification
1	South Korea	4	3	1	0	135	103	+32	7 (Note: South Korea 29–29 Denmark)	Quarterfinals
2	Denmark	4	3	1	0	125	98	+27	7	Quarterfinals
3	France	4	2	0	2	105	106	−1	4	Quarterfinals
4	Spain	4	0	1	3	86	110	−24	1 (Note: Spain 24–24 Angola)	Quarterfinals
5	Angola	4	0	1	3	97	131	−34	1	

Rules for classification: 1) Points; 2) Head-to-head points; 3) Head-to-head goal difference; 4) Head-to-head goals scored; 5) Goal difference; 6) Goals scored; 7) Draw.
Notes:

15 August 2004; 19:30	Spain	24 – 24	Angola	Sports Pavilion, Athens; Referees: Gardinovacki, Maric (SCG)
15 August 2004; 19:30	Puche 13	(14-10)	Fernandes, Pio 5	Sports Pavilion, Athens; Referees: Gardinovacki, Maric (SCG)
15 August 2004; 19:30	3× (yellow card) 4× (suspension)		2× (yellow card) 6× (suspension)	Sports Pavilion, Athens; Referees: Gardinovacki, Maric (SCG)

17 August 2004; 14:30	Angola	30 – 40	South Korea	Sports Pavilion, Athens; Referees: Nachevski, Nachevski (MKD)
17 August 2004; 14:30	Bengue 11	(12-19)	Oh 10	Sports Pavilion, Athens; Referees: Nachevski, Nachevski (MKD)
17 August 2004; 14:30	3× (yellow card) 1× (suspension)		3× (yellow card) 3× (suspension)	Sports Pavilion, Athens; Referees: Nachevski, Nachevski (MKD)

21 August 2004; 14:30	Angola	21 - 29	France	Sports Pavilion, Athens; Referees: Bavas, Migas (GRE)
21 August 2004; 14:30	Bengue 7	(6-12)	Pecqueux-Rolland 8	Sports Pavilion, Athens; Referees: Bavas, Migas (GRE)
21 August 2004; 14:30	3× (yellow card) 3× (suspension)		3× (yellow card) 4× (suspension)	Sports Pavilion, Athens; Referees: Bavas, Migas (GRE)

23 August 2004; 21:30	Denmark	38 - 22	Angola	Sports Pavilion, Athens; Referees: Bavas, Migas (GRE)
23 August 2004; 21:30	Daugaard 7	(19-8)	Bengue 8	Sports Pavilion, Athens; Referees: Bavas, Migas (GRE)
23 August 2004; 21:30	3× (yellow card) 2× (suspension)		3× (yellow card) 5× (suspension)	Sports Pavilion, Athens; Referees: Bavas, Migas (GRE)

9th-10th Place Final

26 August 2004; 12:30	Greece	23 -38	Angola	Helliniko Arena, Athens; Referees: Boye, Jensen (DEN)
26 August 2004; 12:30	Potari 6	(11-18)	Bengue 8	Helliniko Arena, Athens; Referees: Boye, Jensen (DEN)
26 August 2004; 12:30	3× (yellow card) 3× (suspension)		3× (yellow card) 2× (suspension)	Helliniko Arena, Athens; Referees: Boye, Jensen (DEN)

== Judo ==
Athlete	Event	Round of 32	Round of 16	Quarterfinals	Semifinals	Repechage 1	Repechage 2	Repechage 3	Final / BM	
Athlete	Event	Opposition Result	Opposition Result	Opposition Result	Opposition Result	Opposition Result	Opposition Result	Opposition Result	Opposition Result	Rank
Antonia Moreira	Women's −70 kg	Hernandez (CUB); W 1010–0000	Kim R-M (PRK); L 0010–1001	did not advance						

== Swimming ==
Men

Athlete	Event	Heat		Semifinal		Final	
Athlete	Event	Time	Rank	Time	Rank	Time	Rank
Luis Matias	100 m butterfly	58.92	57	did not advance			
