= Angola women's national junior handball team =

Angola

Information
- Association: Federação Angolana de Andebol
- Coach: José Chuma

Colours
1st	2nd

Results

IHF U-20 World Championship
- Appearances: 14 (First in 1995)
- Best result: 6th (2022)

African Junior Championship
- Appearances: 16 (First in 1986)
- Best result: 10x (1994, 1996, 1998, 2000, 2004, 2006, 2009, 2013, 2015, 2017)
- Last updated on Unknown.

The Angola Women's Junior National Handball Team represents Angola in international handball competitions and is controlled by the Federação Angolana de Andebol. At continental level, it competes at the African Women's Junior Handball Championship which qualifies for the IHF Women's Junior World Championship. Angola has been a member of the IHF since 1979.

== Tournament record ==
=== World Championship ===
Year	Round	Position	GP	W	D*	L	GS	GA	GD
Canada 1983	Did not participate								
France 1985	Did not participate								
Korea 1987	Did not participate								
Denmark 1989	Did not participate								
Nigeria 1991	Did not participate								
France 1993	Did not participate								
Brazil 1995		15/20	7	2	0	5	139	175	−36
Côte d'Ivoire 1997		17/17	4	0	0	4	78	110	−32
Chile 1999		17/20	7	2	0	5	163	196	−33
Hungary 2001		15/20	8	4	0	4	167	187	−20
Greece 2003	Did not participate								
Czech Republic 2005		15/20	8	3	1	4	211	223	−12
Macedonia 2008		11/20	8	3	0	5	208	216	−8
Korea 2010		14/24	7	3	0	4	196	180	+16
Czech Republic 2012	President's Cup	19/24	7	2	0	5	164	199	−35
Croatia 2014	President's Cup	21/24	7	2	0	5	198	201	−3
Russia 2016	9–16th	14/24	7	1	1	5	183	199	−16
Hungary 2018	President's Cup	19/23	7	2	0	5	177	198	−21
Slovenia 2022	Quarterfinals	6/32	8	4	0	4	204	196	+8
North Macedonia 2024	President's Cup	18/32	8	5	0	3	205	159	+46
China 2026	President's Cup	22/32	7	3	1	3	177	147	+30
Total	12/19	0 Titles	100	36	3	61	2470	2616	−116

=== African Championship ===
Year	Reached	Position	GP	W	D*	L	GS	GA	GD
Nigeria 1980	Did not participate								
Benin 1982	Did not participate								
Nigeria 1984	Did not participate								
Algeria 1986	Semi-final	3rd							
Tunisia 1988	Semi-final	3rd							
Egypt 1990	Final	2nd							
Tunisia 1992	???								
Egypt 1994	Cancelled								
Egypt 1996	Final	1st							
Côte d'Ivoire 1998	Final	1st							
Tunisia 2000	Final	1st							
Benin 2002	Final	2nd	4	3	0	1	123	94	+29
Côte d'Ivoire 2004	Final	1st	3	3	0	0	98	77	+21
Côte d'Ivoire 2006	Final	1st	4	4	0	0	119	80	+39
Côte d'Ivoire 2009	Final	1st	4	4	0	0	120	96	+24
Burkina Faso 2011	Final	2nd	5	4	0	1	140	98	+42
Oyo 2013	Final	1st	4	4	0	0	122	69	+53
Nairobi 2015	Final	1st	5	4	1	0	162	102	+60
Abidjan 2017	Final	1st	6	6	0	0	211	117	+94
Niamey 2019	Final	2nd	5	4	0	1	148	100	+48
Total	15/16	9 Titles							

=== Players ===
Angola women's junior handball players

=== 2011–2018 ===
A = African championship; A = African championship winner; W = World cup

#	Name	A	P	H	W	C	T.C.	Q.T.	Fernandes		P.N.	Edgar Neto		
#	Name	A	P	H	W	C	2011	2012	2013	2014	2015	2016	2017	2018
#	Name	A	P	H	W	C	A	W	A	W	A	W	–	W
1	Aminata Kanka	19	GK	170	94	ASA	-	-	-	-	-	1	2017	2018
17	Audília Carlos	20	GK	170	78	PET	-	-	-	-	-	-	2017	2018
5	Beatriz Masseu	18	LB	170	61	PRI	-	-	-	-	-	-	-	2018
11	Celma Mário	19	LB	170	75	MAR	-	-	-	-	-	-	2017	2018
9	Chelsia Gabriel	17	CB	170	55	PRI	-	-	-	-	-	-	-	2018
16	Eliane Paulo	19	GK	180	73	PRI	-	-	-	-	-	-	-	2018
3	Emingarda Ferreira	19	RW	160	59	PET	-	-	-	-	-	-	2017	2018
7	Estefânia Venâncio	19	P	173	74	PET	-	-	-	-	-	12	-	2018
14	Giza Marques	19	LW	170	67	PRI	-	-	-	-	-	-	-	2018
8	Helena Paulo	20	CB	170	63	PRI	-	-	-	-	2015	-	2017	2018
13	Ilódia Joaquim	19	P	190	80	PET	-	-	-	-	-	-	2017	2018
6	Luzia Kiala	18	RB	170	62	PRI	-	-	-	-	-	-	-	2018
2	Mafuta Pedro	19	RW	180	68	MAR	-	-	-	-	-	-	2017	2018
4	Mornesa Tenda	18	LW	180	63	PET	-	-	-	-	-	-	-	2018
15	Patrícia Neto	19	LW	170	73	MAR	-	-	-	-	-	-	2017	2018
10	Ruth João	19	P	180	62	MAR	-	-	-	-	-	-	2017	2018

=== 2000–2010 ===
A = African championship; A = African championship winner; W = World cup

Name	A	P	H	W	João Ricardo		Vivaldo Eduardo					N.C.	J.R.
Name	A	P	H	W	2000	2001	2002	2004	2005	2006	2008	2009	2010
Name	A	P	H	W	A	W	A	A	W	A	W	A	W
Acilene Sebastião	18				-	-	-	2004	8	-	-	-	-
Anastácia Sibo	18				2000	-	-	-	-	-	-	-	-
Azenaide Carlos	20		1.74	63	-	-	-	-	-	-	-	2009	10
Benigna Tindrato					-	-	-	2004	-	-	-	-	-
Bombo Calandula					-	-	2002	-	-	-	-	-	-
Carla Ambrósio					-	-	-	2004	-	-	-	-	-
Carolina Morais	19				-	-	-	-	4	-	-	-	-
Catiana César					-	-	-	2004	-	-	-	-	-
Cilízia Tavares	17				2000	-	2002	-	-	-	-	-	-
Cláudia Agostinho					-	-	-	-	-	-	-	2009	-
Cláudia Fumuassuca	20		1.64	72	-	-	-	-	-	-	1	-	1
Constantina Paulo	17				2000	-	2002	-	-	-	-	-	-
Cristina Branco	20	GK			-	-	2002	2004	1	-	-	-	-
Delfina Mungongo					-	-	-	-	-	-	10	-	-
Edilaine Tavares					-	-	-	2004	-	-	-	-	-
Edith Mbunga	19		1.78	63	-	-	-	-	-	-	-	2009	13
Edna Pedro					2000	-	-	-	-	-	-	-	-
Elizabeth Cailo	18				-	-	-	2004	7	-	-	-	-
Elizabeth Viegas	20				-	-	-	2004	15	-	-	-	-
Ernestina Bastos					2000	-	-	-	-	-	-	-	-
Evelina Sibo					-	-	2002	-	-	-	-	-	-
Felicidade Sibo					-	-	2002	-	-	-	-	-	-
Florinda Venâncio					-	-	2002	-	-	-	-	-	-
Idrísia José	19		1.67	61	-	-	-	-	-	-	-	-	12
Inácia Calitangui					-	-	-	-	-	-	4	-	-
Iracelma Silva	19		1.74	53	-	-	-	-	-	-	15	-	14
Irina Almeida					2000	-	-	-	-	-	-	-	-
Isabel Fernandes	20				-	-	2002	2004	10	-	-	-	-
Isabel Guialo	20		1.68	65	-	-	-	-	-	-	14	2009	9
Ivete Simão	19		1.83	69	-	-	-	-	-	-	-	2009	22
Janete dos Santos	19		1.72	62	-	-	-	-	-	-	13	2009	8
Lidalva de Carvalho	20		1.64	68	-	-	-	-	-	-	-	2009	3
Lisandra Salvador	19				-	-	-	-	-	-	-	2009	-
Lurdes Monteiro	18				-	-	2002	-	-	-	-	-	-
Lourena Carlos	20				-	-	-	-	-	-	9	-	-
Luísa Calado	18				2000	-	-	-	-	-	-	-	-
Luísa Kiala					2000	-	-	-	-	-	-	-	-
Magda Cazanga	19		1.80	70	-	-	-	-	-	-	-	2009	15
Maravilha Luís	20		1.64	72	-	-	-	-	-	-	7	2009	6
Marcelina Ferreira					-	-	-	2004	-	-	-	-	-
Marcia Fortunato					-	-	-	2004	-	-	-	-	-
Marisa Varela					-	-	-	2004	3	-	6	-	-
Marta Santos	20				-	-	-	-	-	-	8	-	-
Marta Vikuvaia	19		1.65	68	-	-	-	-	-	-	11	2009	5
Matilde André	19				-	-	2002	-	6	-	-	-	-
Mircea Cruz					-	-	2002	-	-	-	-	-	-
Nádia Silva					2000	-	-	-	-	-	-	-	-
Nair Almeida	16				2000	-	2002	-	-	-	-	-	-
Natália Alexandre					-	-	2002	-	-	-	-	-	-
Natália Bernardo	19				-	-	-	2004	9	-	-	-	-
Nelly Miguel					-	-	-	-	11	-	-	-	-
Neusa Kimaz					-	-	-	-	13	-	-	-	-
Nilsa Varela					-	-	-	-	2	-	-	-	-
Núria Pacavira	20		1.64	72	-	-	-	-	-	-	-	2009	2
Olga Teca					2000	-	-	-	-	-	-	-	-
Patrícia Santos	20		1.72	70	-	-	-	-	-	-	-	2009	4
Rosana Castro					2000	-	2002	-	-	-	-	-	-
Rossana Quitongo	20		1.72	62	-	-	-	-	-	-	3	2009	7
Rossana Santos		B			-	-	2002	-	-	-	-	-	-
Ruth Varela					-	-	-	2004	-	-	-	-	-
Sandra Chagas					-	-	-	-	-	-	-	2009	-
Sandra Inácio					2000	-	-	-	-	-	-	-	-
Sílvia Mulabo	20		1.84	61	-	-	-	-	-	-	-	2009	16
Tânia Feijó					-	-	-	-	-	-	5	-	-
Tatiana César					-	-	-	-	5	-	-	-	-
Teresa Almeida	20	GK			-	-	-	2004	12	-	12	-	-
Teresa Cangombe					-	-	2002	-	-	-	-	-	-
Teresa Sakenda					-	-	-	2004	-	-	-	-	-
Ticiana Maria					2000	-	-	-	-	-	-	-	-
Vanusa Moreira					2000	-	-	-	-	-	-	-	-

=== Head coach positions ===
- (Angola) Edgar Neto – 2016–2019
- (Angola) Pedro Neto – 2015
- (Angola) Alex Fernandes – 2013, 2014
- (Angola) Quinteiro Teresa – 2012
- (Angola) Tony Costa – 2011
- (Angola) João Ricardo – 2010
- (Angola) Nelson Catito – 2009
- (Angola) Vivaldo Eduardo – 2002–2008
- (Angola) João Ricardo – 2000, 2001

== See also ==
- Angola women's national handball team
- Angola women's youth national handball team
- Angola women's junior basketball team
