= Angola at the 2008 Summer Olympics =

- IOC code: ANG
- NOC: Angolan Olympic Committee
- Website: www.comiteolimpicoangolano.com

in Beijing
- Competitors: 32 in 6 sports
- Flag bearer: João N'Tyamba
- Medals: Gold 0 Silver 0 Bronze 0 Total 0

Summer Olympics appearances (overview)
- 1980; 1984; 1988; 1992; 1996; 2000; 2004; 2008; 2012; 2016; 2020; 2024; 2028

Angola competed at the 2008 Summer Olympics in Beijing, China. This is a list of all of the Angolan athletes who qualified for the Olympics.

== Athletics ==
Key

- Note–Ranks given for track events are within the athlete's heat only
- Q = Qualified for the next round
- q = Qualified for the next round as a fastest loser or, in field events, by position without achieving the qualifying target
- NR = National record
- N/A = Round not applicable for the event
- Bye = Athlete not required to compete in round

Men

Athlete	Event	Final	
Athlete	Event	Result	Rank
João N'Tyamba	Marathon	DNF	

== Basketball ==
The men's team qualified by winning the FIBA Africa Championship 2007 tournament.

- Men's team event – 1 team of 12 players

=== Men's tournament ===
Roster

The following is the Angola roster in the men's basketball tournament of the 2008 Summer Olympics.

Angola men's national basketball team roster – 2008 Summer Olympics roster
Players
Coaches

Pos.	No.	Name	Age – Date of birth	Height	Club	Ctr.
SF	4	Olimpio Cipriano	26 – April 9, 1982	6 ft 4 in (1.93 m)	Primeiro de Agosto	(Angola)
G	5	Armando Costa	25 – June 3, 1983	6 ft 4 in (1.93 m)	Petro Atlético	(Angola)
SG	6	Carlos Morais	22 – October 16, 1985	6 ft 3 in (1.91 m)	Petro Atlético	(Angola)
PG	7	Milton Barros	24 – June 21, 1984	6 ft 1 in (1.85 m)	Petro Atlético	(Angola)
G	8	Luis Costa	30 – June 7, 1978	6 ft 4 in (1.93 m)	Petro Atlético	(Angola)
G	9	Vladimir Geronimo	30 – December 12, 1977	6 ft 4 in (1.93 m)	Primeiro de Agosto	(Angola)
F/C	10	Joaquim Gomes	27 – December 23, 1980	6 ft 8 in (2.03 m)	Primeiro de Agosto	(Angola)
F	11	Felizardo Ambrosio	20 – December 25, 1987	6 ft 7 in (2.01 m)	Primeiro de Agosto	(Angola)
C	12	Abdel Aziz Moussa	28 – April 8, 1980	6 ft 8 in (2.03 m)	Primeiro de Agosto	(Angola)
SG	13	Carlos Almeida (C)	31 – September 24, 1976	6 ft 4 in (1.93 m)	Primeiro de Agosto	(Angola)
F	14	Leonel Paulo	22 – April 30, 1986	6 ft 6 in (1.98 m)	Petro Atlético	(Angola)
F	15	Eduardo Mingas	29 – January 29, 1979	6 ft 7 in (2.01 m)	Petro Atlético	(Angola)

Head coach

- (Portugal) Alberto de Carvalho

Legend

- (C) Team captain
- Club – describes last
  club before the tournament
- Age – describes age
  on August 9, 2008

Group play

Pos	Team	Pld	W	L	PF	PA	PD	Pts	Qualification
1	United States	5	5	0	515	354	+161	10	Quarterfinals
2	Spain	5	4	1	418	369	+49	9	Quarterfinals
3	Greece	5	3	2	415	375	+40	8	Quarterfinals
4	China (H)	5	2	3	366	400	−34	7	Quarterfinals
5	Germany	5	1	4	330	390	−60	6	
6	Angola	5	0	5	321	477	−156	5	

Source: FIBA archive
Rules for classification: 1) points; 2) head-to-head points; 3) head-to-head goal average; 4) head-to-head number of points scored.
(H) Hosts

10 August 2008
11:15

Report

Germany	95–66	Angola
Scoring by quarter: 25–21, 29–13, 24–18, 17–14
Pts: Kaman 24; Rebs: Jagla 11; Asts: Hamann 4		Pts: Mingas 24; Rebs: Gomes 8 Asts: Cipriano 2

Wukesong Indoor Stadium, Beijing
Attendance: 11,083
Referees: Romualdas Brazauskas (LTU)

12 August 2008
20:00

Report

Angola	76–97	United States
Scoring by quarter: 18–29, 19–26, 16–26, 23–16
Pts: Morais 24; Rebs: Gomes 8 Asts: Costa, Ambrosio 2		Pts: Wade 19; Rebs: Anthony 6 Asts: James 5

Wukesong Indoor Stadium, Beijing
Attendance: 11,083
Referees: Pablo Estévez (ARG)

14 August 2008
14:30

Report

Angola	68–85	China
Scoring by quarter: 15–28, 27–16, 9–21, 17–20
Pts: Gomes 17; Rebs: Mingas 5 Asts: Gomes 3		Pts: Yao 30; Rebs: Yi 11; Asts: Zhu, Li 3

Wukesong Indoor Stadium, Beijing
Attendance: 11,083
Referees: Carl Jungebrand (FIN)

16 August 2008
09:00

Report

Greece	102–61	Angola
Scoring by quarter: 12–11, 31–17, 38–14, 21–19
Pts: Bourousis 22; Rebs: Glyniadakis, Fotsis 7 Asts: Fotsis 5		Pts: Mingas 25; Rebs: Geronimo 7 Asts: Costa 4

Wukesong Indoor Stadium, Beijing
Attendance: 11,083
Referees: José Carrión (PUR)

18 August 2008
16:45

Report

Angola	50–98	Spain
Scoring by quarter: 23–15, 7–25, 11–31, 9–27
Pts: Mingas 10; Rebs: Mingas, Ambrosio 5 Asts: Costa 5		Pts: P. Gasol 31; Rebs: P. Gasol 9 Asts: Rodríguez, Rubio 5

Wukesong Indoor Stadium, Beijing
Attendance: 11,083
Referees: Eddie Rush (USA)

== Canoeing ==
=== Sprint ===
Athlete	Event	Heats		Semifinals		Final	
Athlete	Event	Time	Rank	Time	Rank	Time	Rank
Fortunato Luis Pacavira	Men's C-1 500 m	2:13.265	8	Did not advance			
Fortunato Luis Pacavira	Men's C-1 1000 m	4:39.538	7 QS	4:40.697	9	Did not advance	

Qualification Legend: QS = Qualify to semi-final; QF = Qualify directly to final

== Handball ==
Angola hadqualified a women's team.

- Women's team event – 1 team of 14 players

=== Women's tournament ===
Roster

The following is the Angola roster in the women's handball tournament of the 2008 Summer Olympics.

Head coach: Jerónimo Neto

No.	Pos.	Name	Date of birth (age)	Height	App.	Goals	Club
1	GK	Maria Odeth Tavares	18 August 1976 (aged 31)	1.70 m	100		(Angola) 1º de Agosto
2	CB	Maria Teresa Eduardo	17 September 1973 (aged 34)	1.78 m	117	297	(Angola) ASA Handball
3	LB	Ilda Maria Bengue	30 October 1974 (aged 33)	1.78 m	143	308	(Angola) Petro Atlético
4	RB	Azenaide Carlos	14 June 1990 (aged 18)	1.74 m	6	7	(Angola) ASA Handball
5	RW	Filomena Trindade	26 September 1971 (aged 36)	1.65 m	152	503	(Angola) Petro Atlético
6	P	Bombo Calandula	23 February 1983 (aged 25)	1.78 m	26	57	(Angola) Petro Atlético
8	LB	Nair Almeida	23 January 1984 (aged 24)	1.80 m	79	151	(Angola) 1º de Agosto
9	LB	Wuta Dombaxe	5 April 1986 (aged 22)	1.68 m	19	132	(Angola) ASA Handball
10	LW	Isabel Fernandes	5 June 1985 (aged 23)	1.80 m	6	18	(Angola) Petro Atlético
12	GK	Maria Rosa Pedro	29 December 1982 (aged 25)	1.73 m	46		(Angola) Petro Atlético
13	CB	Luisa Kiala	25 January 1982 (aged 26)	1.79 m	66	158	(Angola) Petro Atlético
14	CB	Natalia Bernardo	25 December 1986 (aged 21)	1.70 m	37	67	(Angola) Petro Atlético
15	LW	Elisabeth Cailo	2 July 1987 (aged 21)	1.75 m	29	30	(Angola) 1º de Agosto
17	P	Elizabeth Viegas	20 January 1985 (aged 23)	1.78 m	13	10	(Angola) ASA Handball

Group play

Team	Pld	W	D	L	GF	GA	GD	Pts	Qualification
Norway	5	5	0	0	154	106	+48	10	Qualified for the quarterfinals
Romania	5	4	0	1	150	112	+38	8	Qualified for the quarterfinals
China	5	2	0	3	122	135	−13	4	Qualified for the quarterfinals
France	5	2	0	3	121	128	−7	4	Qualified for the quarterfinals
Kazakhstan	5	1	1	3	109	137	−28	3	
Angola	5	0	1	4	109	147	−38	1	

9 August 2008; 09:00	France	32 – 21	Angola	Olympic Sports Centre Gymnasium; Referees: Chernega, Poladenko (RUS)
9 August 2008; 09:00	Herbrecht 8	(13–14)	Bengue, Almeida 5	Olympic Sports Centre Gymnasium; Referees: Chernega, Poladenko (RUS)
9 August 2008; 09:00	3× (yellow card) 4× (suspension)	Report	3× (yellow card) 3× (suspension)	Olympic Sports Centre Gymnasium; Referees: Chernega, Poladenko (RUS)

11 August 2008; 14:00	Angola	17 – 31	Norway	Olympic Sports Centre Gymnasium; Referees: Liu S, Liu F (CHN)
11 August 2008; 14:00	Almeida 5	(6–14)	Riegelhuth 6	Olympic Sports Centre Gymnasium; Referees: Liu S, Liu F (CHN)
11 August 2008; 14:00	3× (yellow card) 3× (suspension)	Report	3× (yellow card) 2× (suspension)	Olympic Sports Centre Gymnasium; Referees: Liu S, Liu F (CHN)

13 August 2008; 15:45	China	32 – 24	Angola	Olympic Sports Centre Gymnasium; Referees: Canbro, Claesson (SWE)
13 August 2008; 15:45	Liu Xiaomei 7	(14–12)	Almeida 8	Olympic Sports Centre Gymnasium; Referees: Canbro, Claesson (SWE)
13 August 2008; 15:45	3× (yellow card) 5× (suspension) 1× (red card)	Report	4× (yellow card) 2× (suspension)	Olympic Sports Centre Gymnasium; Referees: Canbro, Claesson (SWE)

15 August 2008; 15:45	Romania	28 – 23	Angola	Olympic Sports Centre Gymnasium; Referees: Aires Menezes, Aparecido Pinto (BRA)
15 August 2008; 15:45	Maier 7	(16–7)	Almeida 8	Olympic Sports Centre Gymnasium; Referees: Aires Menezes, Aparecido Pinto (BRA)
15 August 2008; 15:45	2× (yellow card) 3× (suspension)	Report	3× (yellow card) 2× (suspension)	Olympic Sports Centre Gymnasium; Referees: Aires Menezes, Aparecido Pinto (BRA)

17 August 2008; 10:45	Angola	24 – 24	Kazakhstan	Olympic Sports Centre Gymnasium; Referees: Din, Dinu (ROU)
17 August 2008; 10:45	Bengue 6	(16–14)	three players 5	Olympic Sports Centre Gymnasium; Referees: Din, Dinu (ROU)
17 August 2008; 10:45	3× (yellow card) 5× (suspension)	Report	3× (yellow card) 5× (suspension)	Olympic Sports Centre Gymnasium; Referees: Din, Dinu (ROU)

== Swimming ==
Men

Athlete	Event	Heat		Semifinal		Final	
Athlete	Event	Time	Rank	Time	Rank	Time	Rank
Joao Luis Cardoso Matias	100 m butterfly	57.06	63	Did not advance			

Women

Athlete	Event	Heat		Semifinal		Final	
Athlete	Event	Time	Rank	Time	Rank	Time	Rank
Ana Crysna da Silva Romero	50 m freestyle	29.06	65	Did not advance			

== Volleyball ==
=== Beach ===
Athlete	Event	Preliminary round	Standing	Round of 16	Quarterfinals	Semifinals	Final / BM	
Athlete	Event	Opposition Score	Standing	Opposition Score	Opposition Score	Opposition Score	Opposition Score	Rank
Morais Abreu; Emanuel Fernandes	Men's	Pool C Emanuel – Ricardo (BRA); L 0 – 2 (8–21, 13–21); Schacht – Slack (AUS); L 0 – 2 (15–21, 9–21); Geor – Gia (GEO); L 0 – 2 (14–21, 13–21)	4	Did not advance				

== See also ==
- Angola at the 2008 Summer Paralympics
