= List of flag bearers for Angola at the Olympics =

Angola at the Olympics
- IOC code: ANG
- NOC: Angolan Olympic Committee
- Website: www.comiteolimpicoangolano.com (in Portuguese)
- Medals: Gold 0 Silver 0 Bronze 0 Total 0

Summer appearances
- 1980; 1984; 1988; 1992; 1996; 2000; 2004; 2008; 2012; 2016; 2020; 2024

This is a list of flag bearers who have represented Angola at the Olympics.

Flag bearers carry the national flag of their country at the opening ceremony of the Olympic Games.

#	Event year	Season	Flag bearer	Sport
1	1980	Summer	Fernando Lopes	Swimming
2	1988	Summer	João N'Tyamba	Athletics
3	1992	Summer		
4	1996	Summer	Palmira de Almeida	Handball
5	2000	Summer	Nádia Cruz	Swimming
6	2004	Summer	Ângelo Victoriano	Basketball
7	2008	Summer	João N'Tyamba	Athletics
8	2012	Summer	Antónia Moreira	Judo
9	2016	Summer	Luísa Kiala	Handball
10	2020	Summer	Natália Bernardo	Handball
10	2020	Summer	Matias Montinho	Sailing
11	2024	Summer	Azenaide Carlos	Handball
11	2024	Summer	Edmilson Pedro	Judo

== See also ==
- Angola at the Olympics
