= Angola at the 2012 Summer Olympics =

- IOC code: ANG
- NOC: Angolan Olympic Committee
- Website: www.comiteolimpicoangolano.com

in London
- Competitors: 35 in 7 sports
- Flag bearers: Antonia Moreira (opening); Nelson Henriques (closing)
- Medals: Gold 0 Silver 0 Bronze 0 Total 0

Summer Olympics appearances (overview)
- 1980; 1984; 1988; 1992; 1996; 2000; 2004; 2008; 2012; 2016; 2020; 2024

Angola competed at the 2012 Summer Olympics in London, United Kingdom, from 27 July to 12 August 2012. This was the nation's eighth Olympic appearance at the Olympics, except the 1984 Summer Olympics in Los Angeles because of its participation in the Soviet boycott.

Comité Olímpico Angolano sent the nation's largest delegation to the Games, surpassing the Beijing delegation by three athletes. A total of 35 athletes, 5 men and 30 women, competed in 7 sports. For the second time in its history, Angola was represented by more female than male athletes at an Olympic event. Women's basketball and women's handball were the only team-based sports in which Angola had its representation to these Olympic games. The men's national basketball team, however, did not compete at the Olympics for the first time since 1988. Judoka Antonia Moreira was the nation's flag bearer at the opening ceremony. Angola, however, has yet to win its first ever Olympic medal.

== Athletics ==
Key

- Note–Ranks given for track events are within the athlete's heat only
- Q = Qualified for the next round
- q = Qualified for the next round as a fastest loser or, in field events, by position without achieving the qualifying target
- NR = National record
- N/A = Round not applicable for the event
- Bye = Athlete not required to compete in round

Men

Athlete	Event	Heat		Semifinal		Final	
Athlete	Event	Result	Rank	Result	Rank	Result	Rank
Manuel Antonio	800 m	1:52.54	7	did not advance			

Women

Athlete	Event	Heat		Semifinal		Final	
Athlete	Event	Result	Rank	Result	Rank	Result	Rank
Felismina Cavela	800 m	2:10.95	5	did not advance			

== Basketball ==
Angola has qualified a women's team. It will be made up of 12 athletes.

=== Women's tournament ===
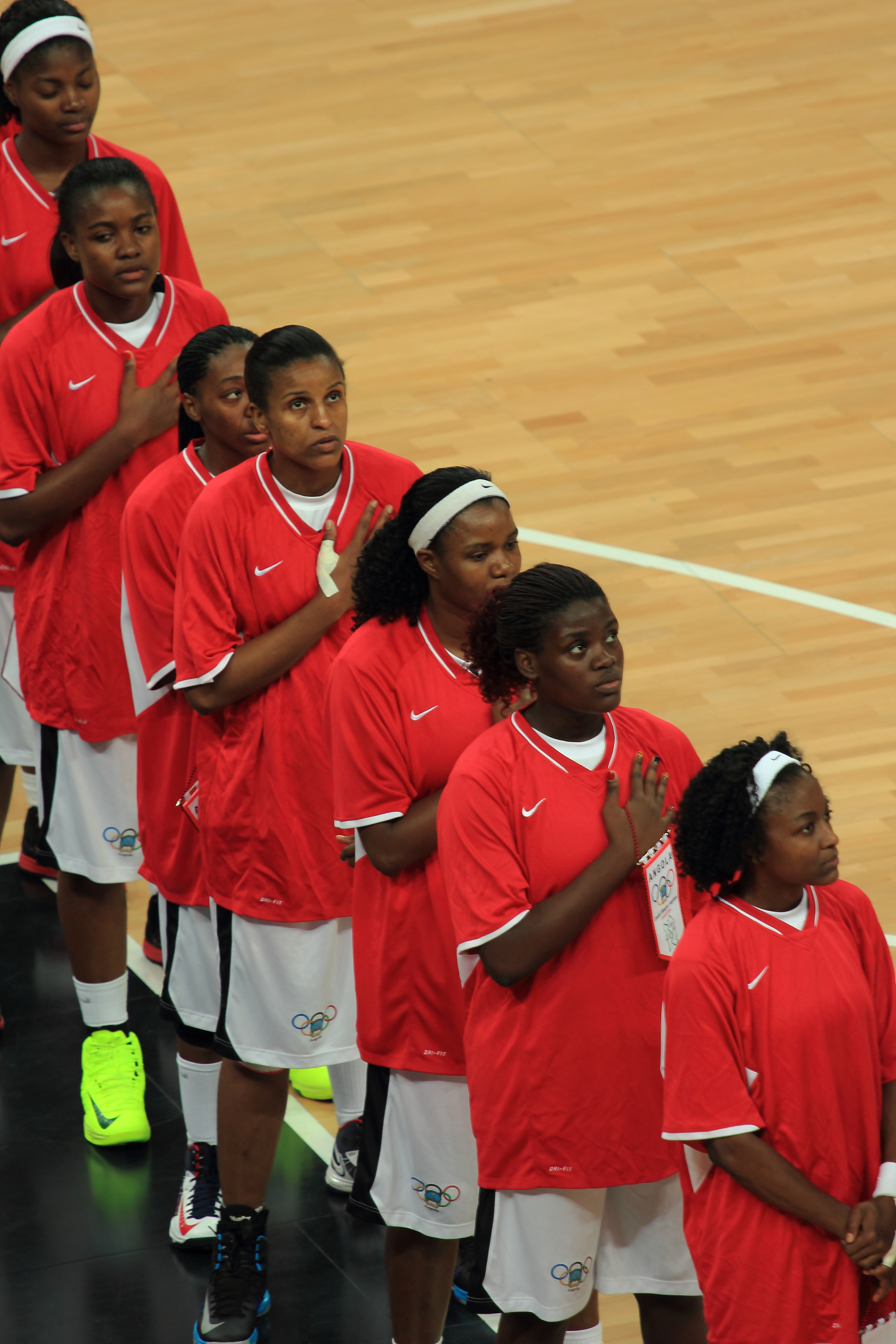
Women's basketball team before their game against Croatia

Roster

The following is the Angola roster in the women's basketball tournament of the 2012 Summer Olympics.

Angola women's national basketball team roster – 2012 Summer Olympics roster
Players
Coaches

Pos.	No.	Name	Age – Date of birth	Height	Club	Ctr.
PG	4	Catarina Camufal	32 – March 30, 1980	5 ft 6 in (1.68 m)	Interclube	(Angola)
F	5	Ana Gonçalves	19 – February 14, 1993	6 ft 0 in (1.83 m)	Interclube Benguela	(Angola)
PG	6	Felizarda Jorge	27 – February 23, 1985	5 ft 8 in (1.73 m)	Primeiro de Agosto	(Angola)
SF	7	Ângela Cardoso	32 – March 30, 1980	5 ft 11 in (1.8 m)	Primeiro de Agosto	(Angola)
G	8	Fineza Eusébio	22 – July 18, 1990	5 ft 10 in (1.78 m)	Primeiro de Agosto	(Angola)
F	9	Madalena Felix	22 – September 20, 1989	5 ft 10 in (1.78 m)	Primeiro de Agosto	(Angola)
PF	10	Sónia Guadalupe	26 – September 15, 1985	6 ft 2 in (1.88 m)	Interclube	(Angola)
C	11	Luísa Tomás	29 – March 24, 1983	6 ft 4 in (1.93 m)	Interclube	(Angola)
SG	12	Astrida Vicente	33 – October 6, 1978	5 ft 8 in (1.73 m)	Interclube	(Angola)
SF	13	Nacissela Maurício (C)	32 – June 2, 1980	6 ft 3 in (1.91 m)	Primeiro de Agosto	(Angola)
PF	14	Nadir Manuel	25 – November 30, 1986	6 ft 1 in (1.85 m)	Interclube	(Angola)
SF	15	Ngiendula Filipe	30 – May 20, 1982	5 ft 10 in (1.78 m)	Interclube	(Angola)

Head coach

- (Angola) Aníbal Moreira

Legend

- (C) Team captain
- Club field describes current club

Group play

Pos	Team	Pld	W	L	PF	PA	PD	Pts	Qualification
1	United States	5	5	0	462	279	+183	10	Quarterfinals
2	Turkey	5	4	1	343	316	+27	9	Quarterfinals
3	China	5	3	2	346	363	−17	8	Quarterfinals
4	Czech Republic	5	2	3	346	332	+14	7	Quarterfinals
5	Croatia	5	1	4	324	379	−55	6	
6	Angola	5	0	5	243	395	−152	5	

Source: FIBA archive
Rules for classification: 1) points; 2) head-to-head points; 3) head-to-head goal average; 4) head-to-head number of points scored.

28 July 2012
14:30

Report

Turkey	72–50	Angola
Scoring by quarter: 21–8, 14–17, 23–14, 14–11
Pts: Palazoğlu 13; Rebs: Çağlar 7 Asts: Vardarlı 5		Pts: Mauricio 11; Rebs: Tomas, Manuel 5 Asts: Camufal 2

Basketball Arena, London
Referees: Elena Chernova (RUS), Vitalis Gode (KEN), Fernando Sampietro (ARG)

30 July 2012
22:15

Report

Angola	38–90	United States
Scoring by quarter: 12–22, 6–19, 11–28, 9–21
Pts: Guadalupe 11; Rebs: Mauricio, Manuel 6 Asts: Manuel 2		Pts: Parker 14; Rebs: Parker 12; Asts: Bird 5

Basketball Arena, London
Referees: Carole Delauné (FRA), Marcos Benito (BRA), Robert Lottermoser (GER)

1 August 2012
11:15

Report

China	76–52	Angola
Scoring by quarter: 15–13, 18–18, 24–6, 19–15
Pts: Ma Zengyu 15; Rebs: Gao Song 9 Asts: Miao Lijie 5		Pts: Guadalupe 12; Rebs: Tomas 9 Asts: three players 2

Basketball Arena, London
Referees: Christos Christodoulou (GRE), Samir Abaakil (MAR), Shenal Bendke (IND)

3 August 2012
09:00

Report

Angola	56–75	Croatia
Scoring by quarter: 18–24, 14–17, 11–18, 13–16
Pts: Tomas 15; Rebs: Mauricio, Tomas 8 Asts: Mauricio 4		Pts: Lelas 23; Rebs: Ivanković 7 Asts: Mandir 5

Basketball Arena, London
Referees: Stephen Seibel (CAN), Shoko Sugruro (JPN), Peng Ling (CHN)

5 August 2012
11:15

Report

Angola	47–82	Czech Republic
Scoring by quarter: 18–23, 7–17, 10–18, 12–24
Pts: Mauricio 18; Rebs: Manuel 12; Asts: Eusébio, Guadalupe 2		Pts: Zrůstová 20; Rebs: Horáková 9 Asts: Elhotová 4

Basketball Arena, London
Referees: Rabah Noujaim (LIB), Vaughan Mayberry (AUS), Vitalis Gode (KEN)

== Boxing ==
Men

Athlete	Event	Round of 16	Quarterfinals	Semifinals	Final	
Athlete	Event	Opposition Result	Opposition Result	Opposition Result	Opposition Result	Rank
Tumba Silva	Heavyweight	Russo (ITA); L WO	did not advance			

== Canoeing ==
=== Sprint ===
Angola has qualified a boat for the following event

Athlete	Event	Heats		Semifinals		Final	
Athlete	Event	Time	Rank	Time	Rank	Time	Rank
Nelson Henriques	Men's C-1 200 m	55.268	6 Q	50.876	8	did not advance	
Fortunato Luis Pacavira	Men's C-1 1000 m	4:39.723	6 Q	4:43.027	7 FB	4:35.017	14
Nelson Henriques; Fortunato Luis Pacavira	Men's C-2 1000 m	4:16.478	6 Q	4:18.543	5 FB	4:15.497	12

Qualification Legend: FA = Qualify to final (medal); FB = Qualify to final B (non-medal)

== Handball ==
Angola has qualified a women's team.

- Women's team event – 1 team of 14 players

=== Women's tournament ===
The following is the Angola roster in the women's handball tournament of the 2012 Summer Olympics.

Head coaches: Vivaldo Eduardo

No.	Pos.	Name	Date of birth (age)	Height	App.	Goals	Club
1	GK	Neide Barbosa	23 September 1980 (aged 31)	1.78 m			(Angola) Petro Atlético
2	LW	Joelma Viegas	15 October 1986 (aged 25)	1.68 m			(Angola) 1º de Agosto
7	RW	Carolina Morais	13 April 1986 (aged 26)	1.67 m			(Angola) 1º de Agosto
8	LB	Nair Almeida	23 January 1984 (aged 28)	1.80 m			(Angola) 1º de Agosto
9	CB	Isabel Guialo	8 April 1980 (aged 32)	1.68 m			(Angola) ASA
10	LB	Isabel Fernandes	5 June 1985 (aged 27)	1.80 m			(Angola) Petro Atlético
11	RB	Luisa Kiala	25 January 1982 (aged 30)	1.79 m			(Angola) Petro Atlético
12	GK	Cristina Direito	15 March 1985 (aged 27)	1.66 m			(Angola) 1º de Agosto
14	LW	Natalia Bernardo	25 December 1986 (aged 25)	1.70 m			(Angola) Petro Atlético
15	RB	Azenaide Carlos	14 June 1990 (aged 22)	1.74 m			(Angola) 1º de Agosto
17	P	Ana Barros	16 February 1993 (aged 19)	1.73 m			(Angola) Petro Atlético
18	CB	Marcelina Kiala	9 November 1979 (aged 32)	1.77 m			(Angola) Petro Atlético
20	RW	Marta Santos	25 December 1988 (aged 23)	1.58 m			(Angola) Petro Atlético
21	LB	Magda Cazanga	28 May 1991 (aged 21)	1.72 m			(Angola) Petro Atlético

Group play

Team	Pld	W	D	L	GF	GA	GD	Pts	Qualification
Brazil	5	4	0	1	137	122	+15	8	Quarter-finals
Croatia	5	4	0	1	145	115	+30	8	Quarter-finals
Russia	5	3	1	1	151	125	+26	7	Quarter-finals
Montenegro	5	2	1	2	137	123	+14	5	Quarter-finals
Angola	5	1	0	4	132	142	−10	2	
Great Britain	5	0	0	5	91	166	−75	0	

28 July 2012; 09:30	Russia	30 – 27	Angola	Copper Box, London; Attendance: 3,604; Referees: Nachevski, Nikolov (MKD)
28 July 2012; 09:30	Postnova 5	(16–11)	Guialo 5	Copper Box, London; Attendance: 3,604; Referees: Nachevski, Nikolov (MKD)
28 July 2012; 09:30	3× (yellow card) 3× (suspension)	Report	3× (yellow card) 4× (suspension)	Copper Box, London; Attendance: 3,604; Referees: Nachevski, Nikolov (MKD)

30 July 2012; 09:30	Angola	23 – 28	Croatia	Copper Box, London; Attendance: 3,892; Referees: Al-Nuaimi, Omar (UAE)
30 July 2012; 09:30	Guialo, M. Kiala 5	(11–13)	Zebić 9	Copper Box, London; Attendance: 3,892; Referees: Al-Nuaimi, Omar (UAE)
30 July 2012; 09:30	2× (yellow card) 4× (suspension)	Report	3× (yellow card) 2× (suspension)	Copper Box, London; Attendance: 3,892; Referees: Al-Nuaimi, Omar (UAE)

1 August 2012; 11:15	Montenegro	30 – 25	Angola	Copper Box, London; Attendance: 4,354; Referees: Abdulla, Bamutref (QAT)
1 August 2012; 11:15	Popović, K. Bulatović 6	(13–14)	Carlos 7	Copper Box, London; Attendance: 4,354; Referees: Abdulla, Bamutref (QAT)
1 August 2012; 11:15	3× (yellow card) 3× (suspension)	Report	3× (yellow card) 3× (suspension)	Copper Box, London; Attendance: 4,354; Referees: Abdulla, Bamutref (QAT)

3 August 2012; 09:30	Angola	31 – 25	Great Britain	Copper Box, London; Attendance: 4,081; Referees: Florescu, Duţă (ROU)
3 August 2012; 09:30	Almeida 8	(14–10)	Gerbron 9	Copper Box, London; Attendance: 4,081; Referees: Florescu, Duţă (ROU)
3 August 2012; 09:30	2× (yellow card) 3× (suspension)	Report	3× (yellow card) 1× (suspension)	Copper Box, London; Attendance: 4,081; Referees: Florescu, Duţă (ROU)

5 August 2012; 11:15	Brazil	29 – 26	Angola	Copper Box, London; Attendance: 4,585; Referees: Bartlett, Stokes (GBR)
5 August 2012; 11:15	three players 5	(14–9)	Kiala 6	Copper Box, London; Attendance: 4,585; Referees: Bartlett, Stokes (GBR)
5 August 2012; 11:15	3× (yellow card) 1× (suspension)	Report	3× (yellow card) 3× (suspension)	Copper Box, London; Attendance: 4,585; Referees: Bartlett, Stokes (GBR)

== Judo ==
Athlete	Event	Round of 32	Round of 16	Quarterfinals	Semifinals	Repechage	Final / BM	
Athlete	Event	Opposition Result	Opposition Result	Opposition Result	Opposition Result	Opposition Result	Opposition Result	Rank
Antonia Moreira	Women's −70 kg	Bye	Alvear (COL); L 0001–0100	did not advance				

== Swimming ==
Angolan swimmers have so far achieved qualifying standards in the following events (up to a maximum of 2 swimmers in each event at the Olympic Qualifying Time (OQT), and 1 at the Olympic Selection Time (OST)):

Men

Athlete	Event	Heat		Final	
Athlete	Event	Time	Rank	Time	Rank
Pedro Pinotes	400 m individual medley	4:24.69	30	did not advance	

Women

Athlete	Event	Heat		Semifinal		Final	
Athlete	Event	Time	Rank	Time	Rank	Time	Rank
Mariana Henriques	50 m freestyle	31.36	61	did not advance			
