= Angola at the Olympics =

- IOC code: ANG
- NOC: Angolan Olympic Committee
- Website: (in Portuguese)
- Medals: Gold 0 Silver 0 Bronze 0 Total 0

Summer appearances
- 1980; 1984; 1988; 1992; 1996; 2000; 2004; 2008; 2012; 2016; 2020; 2024; 2028

Angola has competed in 11 Summer Olympic Games. The nation has not yet won any Olympic medals and has never competed at the Winter Olympic Games. The best positions of the nation, 7th in 1996 and 8th in 2016, were both achieved by the Angolan women's national handball team.

Angola sent to the Summer Olympics in 2012 its largest contingent yet of athletes (34) and competed in the most events (7) out of all the countries in Central Africa. They did not win a medal however. Angola's youngest athlete in 2016 was Leite Hermenegildo, who was 16. Angola's oldest athlete was Joao Paulo de Leiria E Silva who was 52 and competed in Shooting.

== Medal tables ==
=== Medals by Summer Games ===
Games	Athletes	Gold	Silver	Bronze	Total	Rank
(Soviet Union) 1980 Moscow	11	0	0	0	0	–
(United States) 1984 Los Angeles	boycotted					
(South Korea) 1988 Seoul	24	0	0	0	0	–
(Spain) 1992 Barcelona	28	0	0	0	0	–
(United States) 1996 Atlanta	28	0	0	0	0	–
(Australia) 2000 Sydney	30	0	0	0	0	–
(Greece) 2004 Athens	30	0	0	0	0	–
(China) 2008 Beijing	32	0	0	0	0	–
(United Kingdom) 2012 London	34	0	0	0	0	–
(Brazil) 2016 Rio de Janeiro	25	0	0	0	0	–
(Japan) 2020 Tokyo	20	0	0	0	0	–
(France) 2024 Paris	24	0	0	0	0	–
(United States) 2028 Los Angeles	future event					
(Australia) 2032 Brisbane	future event					
Total (11/30)	286	0	0	0	0	–

== Flagbearers ==
Games	Athlete	Sport
1980 Moscow	Fernando Lopes	Swimming
1988 Seoul	João N'Tyamba (??)	Athletics
1992 Barcelona	Jean-Jacques Conceição	Basketball
1996 Atlanta	Palmira Barbosa	Handball
2000 Sydney	Nádia Cruz	Swimming
2004 Athens	Ângelo Victoriano	Basketball
2008 Beijing	João N'Tyamba	Athletics
2012 London	Antónia Moreira	Judo
2016 Rio de Janeiro	Luísa Kiala	Handball
2020 Tokyo	Natália Bernardo & Matias Montinho	Handball (Bernardo) & Sailing (Montinho)
2024 Paris	Azenaide Carlos & Edmilson Pedro	Handball (Carlos) & Judo (Pedro)
