= Angola at the 1980 Summer Olympics =

- IOC code: ANG
- NOC: Angolan Olympic Committee

in Moscow
- Competitors: 11 (10 Men, 1 Woman) in 3 sports
- Flag bearer: Fernando Lopes
- Medals: Gold 0 Silver 0 Bronze 0 Total 0

Summer Olympics appearances (overview)
- 1980; 1984; 1988; 1992; 1996; 2000; 2004; 2008; 2012; 2016; 2020; 2024

Angola competed in the Olympic Games for the first time at the 1980 Summer Olympics in Moscow, USSR.

== Athletics ==
Men
Track & road events

Athlete	Event	Heat		Quarterfinal		Semifinal		Final	
Athlete	Event	Result	Rank	Result	Rank	Result	Rank	Result	Rank
Ilídio Coelho	100 m	11.42	7	did not advance					
Rubén Inácio	200 m	22.52	6	did not advance					
Bernardo Manuel	5000 m	14:51.4	11	did not advance					
Bernardo Manuel	10000 m	DNS		did not advance					

== Boxing ==
Men

Athlete	Event	1 Round	2 Round	3 Round	Quarterfinals	Semifinals	Final	
Athlete	Event	Opposition Result	Opposition Result	Opposition Result	Opposition Result	Opposition Result	Opposition Result	Rank
João Luis de Almeida	Bantamweight	BYE	Raymond Gilbody (GBR); L 0-5	did not advance				
Abilio Almeida Cabral	Featherweight	BYE	Fitzroy Brown (GUY); L 0-5	did not advance				
Alberto Mendes Coelho	Lightweight	Galsandorj Batbileg (MGL); L 0-5	did not advance					

== Swimming ==
Men

Athlete	Event	Heat		Semifinal		Final	
Athlete	Event	Time	Rank	Time	Rank	Time	Rank
Marcos Daniel	100 metre butterfly	1:07.46	33	Did not advance			
Jorge Lima	100 metre backstroke	1:14.33	32	Did not advance			
Jorge Lima	100 metre freestyle	59.39	35	—N/a		Did not advance	
Jorge Lima	200 metre freestyle	2:14.37	40	—N/a		Did not advance	
Francisco Lopes Santos	100 metre breaststroke	1:18.95 NR	22	—N/a		Did not advance	
Fernando Lopes; Francisco Lopes Santos; Marcos Daniel; Jorge Lima	4 × 100 metre medley relay	4:35.11	11	—N/a		Did not advance	

Women

Athlete	Event	Heat		Semifinal		Final	
Athlete	Event	Time	Rank	Time	Rank	Time	Rank
Michele Pessoa	100 metre freestyle	1:09.10	27	—N/a		Did not advance	
Michele Pessoa	100 metre backstroke	1:26.59	26	—N/a		Did not advance	

== Sources ==
- International Olympic Committee, Moscow '80, Fizkulturai Sport Publishers, 1980
- Official Olympic Reports
- Sports Reference
