= Angola at the 1988 Summer Olympics =

- IOC code: ANG
- NOC: Angolan Olympic Committee

in Seoul
- Competitors: 25 in 4 sports
- Flag bearer: João N'Tyamba
- Medals: Gold 0 Silver 0 Bronze 0 Total 0

Summer Olympics appearances (overview)
- 1980; 1984; 1988; 1992; 1996; 2000; 2004; 2008; 2012; 2016; 2020; 2024

Angola competed at the 1988 Summer Olympics in Seoul, South Korea. 24 competitors, 19 men and 5 women, took part in 27 events in 4 sports. The nation returned to the Olympic Games after boycotting the 1984 Summer Olympics.

== Competitors ==
The following is the list of number of competitors in the Games.

| Sport | Men | Women | Total |
|---|---|---|---|
| Athletics | 6 | 1 | 7 |
| Boxing | 3 | – | 3 |
| Judo | 7 | 0 | 7 |
| Swimming | 4 | 4 | 8 |
| Total | 20 | 5 | 25 |

== Athletics ==
=== Men ===
Track & road events

| Athlete | Event | Heat | | Quarterfinal | | Semifinal | | Final | |
| Athlete | Event | Result | Rank | Result | Rank | Result | Rank | Result | Rank |
|---|---|---|---|---|---|---|---|---|---|
| João Carvalho | Marathon | — | | | | | | 2:40.45 | 74 |
| Arménio Fernandes | 100 m | 10.92 | 8 | Did not advance | | | | | |
| Arménio Fernandes | 200 m | DQ | | Did not advance | | | | | |
| Eugénio Katombi | 1500 m | 3:54.25 | 48 | Did not advance | | | | | |
| João N'tyamba | 800 m | 1:53.23 | 6 | Did not advance | | | | | |

Field events

| Athlete | Event | Qualification | | Final | |
| Athlete | Event | Distance | Position | Distance | Position |
|---|---|---|---|---|---|
| António dos Santos | Triple jump | DNF | | Did not advance | |

=== Women ===
Track & road events

| Athlete | Event | Heat | | Quarterfinal | | Semifinal | | Final | |
| Athlete | Event | Result | Rank | Result | Rank | Result | Rank | Result | Rank |
|---|---|---|---|---|---|---|---|---|---|
| Guilhermina da Cruz | 100 m | 12.47 | 7 | Did not advance | | | | | |
| Guilhermina da Cruz | 200 m | 25.62 | 52 | Did not advance | | | | | |

== Boxing ==
Men

| Athlete | Event | 1 Round | 2 Round | 3 Round | Quarterfinals | Semifinals | Final | |
| Athlete | Event | Opposition Result | Opposition Result | Opposition Result | Opposition Result | Opposition Result | Opposition Result | Rank |
|---|---|---|---|---|---|---|---|---|
| Manuel Gomes | Bantamweight | Zengli (ALG); L 0-5 | Did not advance | | | | | |
| Adão N'Zuzi | Welterweight | Mohinga (CAF); L 0-5 | Did not advance | | | | | |
| Apolinário de Silveira | Light middleweight | BYE | Orungi (KEN); W RSC-2 | Woodhall (GBR); L 0-5 | Did not advance | | | |

== Judo ==
Men

| Athlete | Event | Preliminary | Round of 32 | Round of 16 | Quarterfinals | Semifinals | Repechage 1 | Repechage 2 | Repechage 3 | Final / BM | |
| Athlete | Event | Opposition Result | Opposition Result | Opposition Result | Opposition Result | Opposition Result | Opposition Result | Opposition Result | Opposition Result | Opposition Result | Rank |
|---|---|---|---|---|---|---|---|---|---|---|---|
| Abbão Bartolomeu | −60 kg | BYE | Hosokawa (JPN); L Ippon | Did not advance | | | | | | | |
| Luis Fortunato | −65 kg | Bye | Carabetta (FRA); L Ippon | Did not advance | | | | | | | |
| Lotuala N'Dombassy | −71 kg | Loll (GDR); L Ippon | Did not advance | | | | Wohlwend (LIE); L Yuko | Did not advance | | | |
| Ricardo José Boy | −78 kg | BYE | Tayot (FRA); L Ippon | Did not advance | | | | | | | |
| José António Inácio | −86 kg | BYE | Osako (JPN); L Ippon | Did not advance | | | | | | | |
| Moisés Torres (Note: also competed at the 1992 Summer Olympics) | −95 kg | — | BYE | Meijer (NED); L Ippon | Did not advance | | | | | | |
| Helder de Carvalho | +95 kg | — | Bye | Basik (POL); L Ippon | Did not advance | | | | | | |

== Swimming ==
Men

| Athlete | Event | Heat | | Final B | | Final | |
| Athlete | Event | Time | Rank | Time | Rank | Time | Rank |
|---|---|---|---|---|---|---|---|
| Vivaldo Fernandes | 100 metre breaststroke | 1:17.98 | 61 | Did not advance | | | |
| Gaspar Fragata | 100 metre breaststroke | 1:16.18 | 59 | Did not advance | | | |
| Jorge Gomes | 100 metre butterfly | 1:09.60 | 51 | Did not advance | | | |
| Jorge Lima | 50 metre freestyle | DSQ | | Did not advance | | | |
| Jorge Lima | 100 metre freestyle | 55.53 | 62 | Did not advance | | | |
| Jorge Lima | 100 metre butterfly | 59.21 | 42 | Did not advance | | | |

Women

| Athlete | Event | Heat | | Final B | | Final | |
| Athlete | Event | Time | Rank | Time | Rank | Time | Rank |
|---|---|---|---|---|---|---|---|
| Nádia Cruz | 100 metre breaststroke | 1:24.46 | 42 | Did not advance | | | |
| Carla Fernandes | 100 metre freestyle | 1:08.15 | 57 | Did not advance | | | |
| Carla Fernandes | 200 metre backstroke | 1:21.58 | 41 | Did not advance | | | |
| Elsa Freire | 50 metre freestyle | 29.54 | 47 | Did not advance | | | |
| Elsa Freire | 100 metre freestyle | 1:05.47 | 55 | Did not advance | | | |
| Elsa Freire | 100 metre backstroke | 1:15.56 | 39 | Did not advance | | | |
| Elsa Freire | 100 metre butterfly | 1:12.27 | 39 | Did not advance | | | |
| Ana Martins | 50 metre freestyle | 29.74 | 49 | Did not advance | | | |
| Ana Martins | 100 metre breaststroke | 1:24.01 | 41 | Did not advance | | | |
