= Moisés Torres =

Moisés Torres may refer to:

- Moisés Torres (judoka)
- Moisés Torres (politician)
