= João Luis de Almeida =

Angolan boxer (born 1961)

João Luis de Almeida (born 1961) was a boxer from Angola. He represented his country at the 1980 Summer Olympics in Moscow, Soviet Union. He competed in the Men's Bantamweight (54 kg) division. He received a bye during round one of the competition but lost in round 2 on points (0–5) to British boxer Ray Gilbody.

== 1980 Olympic results ==
Below is the record of João Luis de Almeida, an Angolan bantamweight boxer who competed at the 1980 Moscow Olympics:

- Round of 64: bye
- Round of 32: lost to Ray Gilbody (Great Britain) by decision, 0–5

== See also ==
- Angola at the 1980 Summer Olympics
