= Jorge Lima (swimmer) =

Angolan swimmer (born 1967)

Personal information
- Full name: Jorge Barata Lima
- Nationality: Angolan
- Born: 13 July 1967 (age 58)
- Height: 168 cm (5 ft 6 in)
- Weight: 63 kg (139 lb)

Sport
- Sport: Swimming
- Strokes: Freestyle, Backstroke

Jorge Lima (born 13 July 1967) is an Angolan swimmer. He competed in four events at the 1980 Summer Olympics.

At the 1980 Summer Olympics, Lima was the youngest competitor of the games at the age of 13. He competed in the men's 100 m freestyle, 200 m freestyle, 100 m backstroke and the 4 x 100 m medley relay. He finished 8th in his 100 m freestyle heat with a time of 59.39 seconds, 8th in his 200 m freestyle with a time of 2:14.37 seconds and 6th in his 100 m backstroke heat with a time of 1:14.33 seconds. In his 4 x 100 m medley relay heat, he swam with Fernando Lopes, Francisco Santos and Marcos Daniel, Lima swam Angola's last 100 metres. Angola eventually ended up finishing 11th out of 13 nations that competed with a time of 4:35.11 seconds, they finished ahead of Vietnam's team consisting of Pham, Nguyen, Truong and To and Sweden's team of Söderlund, Berggren, Magnusson and Holmertz both teams of which were disqualified.
