= Clube Ferroviário de Luanda (handball) =

Handball team

- Full name: Clube Ferroviário de Luanda
- Short name: Ferrovia
- Founded: 16 June 1914; 110 years ago
- Arena: Campo do Ferrovia
- Capacity: 500
- President: (Angola) Bráulio de Brito
- League: Angola League; Angola Cup; Angola Super Cup
- Club colours
Home	Away

The Clube Ferroviário de Luanda aka Ferroportuária, sports club, among other sports, has a women's handball team competing at the local level, at the Luanda Provincial Handball Championship and at the Angola National Handball Championship. While the club has currently not been involved in any official competitions, Clube Ferroviário was the first Angolan Team handball Club to win an African champions cup title, having achieved such a feat in 1987.

== Honours ==
- Angolan League:
  - Winner (9): 1979, 1981, 1982, 1983, 1984, 1985, 1986, 1987, 1988
- African Club Champions Cup:
  - Winner (1): 1987

== Players ==
Ferroviário de Luanda handball players

Name	A	P	H	W	–		D.A.	–					P.A.	–					
Name	A	P	H	W	81	82	83	84	85	86	87	88	89	90					
Name	A	P	H	W	81	82	83	84	85	86	87	88	89	90	Ana Balbina Bininha	25	LW	1983	1989
Ana Beatriz Bibia		CB					1983						1989						
Ana Paula	21						1983												
Anabela Jaime Nezinha		–					1983						1989						
Bernardeth de Sá Bida		CB					1983						1989						
Branca Rodrigues							1983												
Candida João													1989						
Carla Silva													1989						
Catarina Camacho							1983												
Cesaltina Ceita Butina		W					1983						1989						
Elisa Webba Lilí	20	P											1989						
Elizabeth Bondo	26												1989						
Fábia Raposo		B											1989						
Liné Campos													1989						
Lourdes Pereira							1983												
Luisa Napoleão Xanquete							1983												
Luisa Santos							1983												
Manuela Silva													1989						
Manuela Soito													1989						
Maria Baltazar							1983												
Palmira Barbosa Mirita	28	CB					1983						1989						
Tininha													1989						

== Chairman history ==
- 1981–1985 Francisco de Almeida
- 1985–1988 Feliciano Pedrosa
- 1988–1995 António Agante
- 1996–2005 Sílvio Vinhas
- 2005–2012 Abel Cosme
- 2013–2016 Bráulio de Brito
- 2017–pres Jorge Abreu

== See also ==
- Ferroviário de Luanda Basketball
- Federação Angolana de Andebol
