= Justino Victoriano =

Angolan basketball player (born 1974)

Personal information
- Born: February 19, 1974 (age 52) Luanda, Angola
- Listed height: 202 cm (6.63 ft)
- Listed weight: 100 kg (220 lb)

Career information
- College: Western Nebraska CC (1999–2001); UTEP (2001–2003)
- NBA draft: 2003: undrafted
- Playing career: 2003–2005
- Position: Center

Career history
- ?–2005: Petro Atlético

Justino Monteiro dos Santos Victoriano best known as Puna Victoriano, (born 19 February 1974) is a former Angolan basketball player. Puna, a 6'7" / 220lb Center born in Luanda, he played for Angola at the 1996 Summer Olympics and 1999 Afrobasket. On the club level, he played for Petro Atlético.

Puna is a younger brother of former Angola national basketball team members Ângelo Victoriano and Edmar Victoriano "Baduna".
