= Marcos Daniel (swimmer) =

Angolan swimmer

Personal information
- Full name: Marcos Daniel Gil Medeiros
- Nationality: Angola
- Born: 1 August 1961 (age 64)
- Height: 182 cm (6 ft 0 in)
- Weight: 76 kg (168 lb)

Sport
- Sport: Swimming

Marcos Daniel Gil Medeiros (born 1 August 1961) is an Angolan swimmer.

Daniel was the Angola national record holder in the 100 metres butterfly with a time of 1:07.46 and in the 4 x 100 metres medley relay with a time of 4:35.11.

He competed in two events at the 1980 Summer Olympics.
