= Benjamim Avô =

Angolan basketball player (born 1965)

Benjamin Avô
Petro de Luanda
- Title: Assistant coach
- League: Angola National League

Personal information
- Born: 27 April 1965 (age 61) Luanda, Angola
- Listed height: 183 cm (6.00 ft)
- Listed weight: 81 kg (179 lb)

Career information
- Position: Point guard

Career history
- ?–?: Petro Atlético

Benjamin João Ucuahamba (born 27 April 1965), better known as Benjamin Avô, is a former Angolan basketball player. He was listed at 6’0” and 180 pounds.

== See also ==
- Angola national basketball team
