= Maria Raimundo =

Angolan handball player

Personal information
- Full name: Maria Raimundo
- Nationality: Angolan
- Born: 27 July 1979 (age 47) Angola

Sport
- Sport: Handball
National team
Years	Team	Apps	(Gls)
2000	Angola	?	(0)

Maria Raimundo (born on 27 July 1979), is an Angolan former professional handball player. She played with the Angolan national team at the 2000 Summer Olympics in Sydney.
