= Edith Mbunga =

Angolan handball player

Personal information
- Nationality: Angolan
- Born: 31 October 1991 (age 34)
- Height: 1.78 m (5 ft 10 in)

Sport
- Sport: Handball
- Position: Pivot
- Current club: ASA
National team
- Years: Team
- 2012: Angola

Edith Mbunga (born 31 October 1991) is an Angolan handball player.

She participated at the 2012 Summer Olympics, where Angola placed 10th.

Mbunga was selected as the 15th player of the Angola women's national handball team.
