= Anastácia Sibo =

Angolan handball player

Personal information
- Full name: Anastácia Solange Sibo Dias
- Nationality: Angolan
- Born: 27 May 1982 (age 44)
- Height: 1.84 m (6 ft 0 in)

Sport
- Sport: Handball
- Position: Pivot
- Current club: Progresso do Sambizanga
- Number: 35
National team
Years	Team	Apps	(Gls)
–	Angola	35	(29)
Medal record
African Championship
Gold medal – first place	Salé 2012	Team
African Junior Championship
Gold medal – first place	Yamoussoukro 1998
Gold medal – first place	Tunis 2000

Anastácia Solange Sibo Dias (born 27 May 1982) is an Angolan handball player. She plays for the club Petro Atlético, and on the Angolan national team. She represented Angola at the 2013 World Women's Handball Championship in Serbia.
