= Jerónimo Neto =

Angolan handball coach (1967–2019)

Personal information
- Full name: Jerónimo Miguel Neto
- Nationality: Angolan
- Born: 3 November 1967 Luanda, Angola
- Died: 15 January 2019 (aged 51)
- Height: 1.72 m (5 ft 8 in)

Sport
- Sport: Handball
National team
- Years: Team
- –: Angola
Medal record
African Championship
Gold medal – first place	Tunis 2006	Team
Gold medal – first place	Luanda 2008	Team
All-Africa Games
Gold medal – first place	Algiers 2007	Team

Jerónimo Miguel Neto a.k.a. Jojó (3 November 1967 – 15 January 2019) was a team handball coach.

== Life ==
He was the head coach of the Angola women's national handball team at the 1997, 2005 and 2007 World Women's Handball Championships in Stuttgart, Saint Petersburg and France and at the 2000 Summer Olympics in Sydney. Moreover, he won the African championships in 2006 and 2008 and the All Africa Games in 2007

The 7th place he achieved with the Angolan team at the 2007 world cup in France remains unbeaten to date.

Neto suffered a stroke in 2008 and died on 15 January 2019 of a heart attack. Shortly prior to his death and despite his heart condition, he was a regular participant at the year-end Luanda São Silvestre 10 km race, the last of which, on 31 December 2018.
