= Belina Lariça =

Angolan handball player

Personal information
- Full name: Belina Lariça Miguel Baptista
- Nationality: Angolan
- Born: 11 February 1980 (age 46)
- Height: 176 cm (69 in)

Sport
- Sport: Handball

Senior clubs
- Years: Team
- –: Atlético Petróleos de Luanda
National team
- Years: Team
- –: Angola
Medal record
African Championship
| Gold medal – first place | 2004 Egypt |
| Gold medal – first place | 2006 Tunisia |

Belina Lariça Miguel Baptista (born 11 February 1980) is a former Angolan female handball player.

She competed at the 2004 Summer Olympics, where Angola placed 9th.
