= Rossana Quitongo =

Angolan handball player

Personal information
- Full name: Rossana Wandy Adão Tavares Quitongo
- Nationality: Angolan
- Born: 15 September 1990 (age 36) Luanda, Angola
- Height: 1.72 m (5 ft 8 in)

Sport
- Sport: Handball
- Position: Central back
- Current club: Primeiro de Agosto
- Number: 2
National team
Years	Team	Apps	(Gls)
–	Angola	10	(8)
Medal record
African Championship
Gold medal – first place	Salé 2012	Team

Rossana Wandy Adão Tavares Quitongo (born September 15, 1990) is a team handball player from Angola. She plays on the Angola women's national handball team, and participated at the 2011 World Women's Handball Championship in Brazil.

She is currently playing for Angolan side Primeiro de Agosto.
