= Matilde André =

Angolan handball player (born 1986)

Personal information
- Nationality: Angolan
- Born: 11 February 1986 (age 40) Luanda, Angola
- Height: 1.72 m (5 ft 8 in)

Sport
- Sport: Handball
- Position: Right wing
- Current club: Progresso do Sambizanga
- Number: 19
National team
Years	Team	Apps	(Gls)
–	Angola	32	(61)
Medal record
African Championship
Gold medal – first place	2012 Morocco
African Games
Gold medal – first place	Maputo 2011	National Team
Gold medal – first place	Brazzaville 2015	National Team

Matilde André (born 11 February 1986) is an Angolan handball player. She plays on the Angola women's national handball team and participated at the 2011 World Women's Handball Championship in Brazil.

At club level, she plays for Angolan side Progresso do Sambizanga.
