= Rosa Amaral =

Angolan handball player

Personal information
- Nationality: Angolan
- Born: 21 June 1980 (age 46)
- Height: 175 cm (69 in)

Sport
- Sport: Handball
- Position: Pivot

Senior clubs
- Years: Team
- –: Atlético Petróleos de Luanda
National team
- Years: Team
- –: Angola
Medal record
African Championship
Gold medal – first place	2002 Morocco
Gold medal – first place	2004 Egypt

Rosa Amaral (born 21 June 1980) is a retired Angolan handball player.

She competed at the 2004 Summer Olympics, where Angola placed 9th.
