= Maria Gonçalves =

Angolan handball player

Personal information
- Nationality: Angolan
- Born: 27 June 1976 (age 50)

Sport
- Sport: Handball
National team
- Years: Team
- –: Angola

Maria Gonçalves (born 27 June 1976) is a retired Angolan handball player.

She competed at the 1996 Summer Olympics, where Angola placed 7th.
