= Ivone Mufuca =

Angolan handball player

Personal information
- Full name: Ivone da Conçeicão Mufuca
- Nationality: Angolan
- Born: 24 April 1972
- Died: 10 January 2016 (aged 43) Luanda

Sport
- Sport: Handball
National team
- Years: Team
- –: Angola

Ivone da Conçeicão Mufuca (24 April 1972 – 10 January 2016) was an Angolan handball player.

She competed at the 2000 Summer Olympics, where Angola placed 9th.

Mufuca died on 10 January 2016, while in labour during the birth of her third child.
