= Lia Paulo =

Angolan handball player

Personal information
- Nationality: Angolan
- Born: 15 April 1975 (age 51)

Sport
- Sport: Handball
National team
- Years: Team
- –: Angola

Lia Paulo (born 15 April 1975) is an Angolan handball player.

She competed at the 1996 Summer Olympics, where Angola placed 7th.
