= Ana Barros (handballer) =

Angolan handball player

Patrícia Barros
Personal information
- Full name: Ana Patrícia Barros
- Nationality: Angolan
- Born: February 16, 1993 (age 33)
- Height: 1.73 m (5 ft 8 in)

Sport
- Sport: Handball
- Position: Pivot
- Current club: Petro Atlético
- Number: 17
National team
- Years: Team
- –: Angola
Medal record
African Championship
Gold medal – first place	Salé 2012	Team

Ana Patrícia da Costa Barros (born February 16, 1993) is an Angolan handball player. She plays for the club Petro Atlético, and on the Angolan national team. She competed for the Angolan team at the 2012 Summer Olympics in London.
