= Teresa Ulundo =

Angolan handball player

Personal information
- Full name: Teresa João Ulundo
- Nationality: Angolan
- Born: 8 May 1971 (age 55)

Sport
- Sport: Handball
National team
- Years: Team
- –: Angola

Teresa João Ulundo (born 8 May 1971) is an Angolan handball player.

She competed at the 2000 Summer Olympics, where Angola placed 9th.
