= David Dias =

Angolan basketball player

Personal information
- Born: April 21, 1969 (age 57) Luanda, Angola
- Listed height: 199 cm (6.53 ft)
- Listed weight: 108 kg (238 lb)

Career information
- Playing career: 1985–2003
- Position: Power forward / center

Career history
- 2000: 1º de Agosto
- 2001: Barreirense
Medals
Men's basketball
Representing Angola
FIBA Africa Under-18 Championship
Silver medal – second place	Abuja 1987	Angola (U-18)
AfroBasket
Gold medal – first place	Luanda 1989	Angola
Gold medal – first place	Cairo 1992	Angola
Gold medal – first place	Nairobi 1993	Angola
Gold medal – first place	Algiers 1995	Angola
Gold medal – first place	Casablanca 2001	Angola
Bronze medal – third place	Tunis 1987	Angola
Bronze medal – third place	Dakar 1997	Angola

David Bartolomeu Dias (born 21 April 1969 in Luanda) is a former Angolan basketball power forward. He competed at the 1992, 1996 and 2000 Summer Olympics with the Angola national basketball team.
