= Dionísia Pio =

Angolan handball player

Personal information
- Nationality: Angolan
- Born: 10 February 1977 (age 49)
- Height: 167 cm (66 in)

Sport
- Sport: Handball

Senior clubs
- Years: Team
- –: Resident Eanes Lagos
- –: Ferrobus Mislata
National team
- Years: Team
- –: Angola
Medal record
African Championship
Gold medal – first place	2004 Egypt

Dionísia Pio (born 10 February 1977) is an Angolan handball player.

She competed at the 2004 Summer Olympics, where Angola placed 9th.
