= Maria Inês Jololo =

Angolan handball player

Personal information
- Nationality: Angolan
- Born: 30 November 1975 (age 50)
- Height: 173 cm (68 in)

Sport
- Sport: Handball

Senior clubs
- Years: Team
- –: Deportiv da Enan
- –: Primeiro de Agosto Handball
National team
- Years: Team
- –: Angola
Medal record
African Championship
Gold medal – first place	2000 Algeria
Gold medal – first place	2004 Egypt

Maria Inês Jololo (born 30 November 1975) is an Angolan handball player.

She competed at the 2000 Summer Olympics, where the Angolan team placed 9th, and also at the 2004 Summer Olympics, where Angola placed 9th.
