= Bombo Calandula =

Angolan handball player

Personal information
- Full name: Bombo Madalena Calandula
- Nationality: Angolan
- Born: February 23, 1983 (age 43)
- Height: 1.76 m (5 ft 9 in)

Sport
- Sport: Handball
- Position: Pivot
- Current club: Petro Atlético
- Number: 6
National team
- Years: Team
- –: Angola
Medal record
African Championship
Gold medal – first place	Salé 2012	Team
All-Africa Games
Gold medal – first place	Maputo 2011	National Team

Bombo Madalena Calandula (born February 23, 1983) is a former team handball player from Angola. She played on the Angola women's national handball team, and participated at the 2011 World Women's Handball Championship in Brazil.
