= Nádia Cruz =

Angolan swimmer

Personal information
- Full name: Nádia Vanda Sousa Eloy Cruz
- National team: Angola
- Born: 12 July 1975 (age 51) Luanda, Angola
- Height: 1.59 m (5 ft 3 in)
- Weight: 50 kg (110 lb)

Sport
- Sport: Swimming
- Strokes: Breaststroke

Nádia Vanda Sousa Eloy Cruz (born 12 July 1975) is an Angolan former swimmer, who specialized in breaststroke events. She represented Angola in all four editions of the Olympic Games since 1988, and later became the chairman of the Angolan Olympic Athletes Association (AAOA) in 2010.

== Career ==
Cruz made her first ever Angolan team, as a 13-year-old teen, at the 1988 Summer Olympics in Seoul. She failed to reach the top 16 final in the 100 m breaststroke, finishing in forty-second place at 1:24.46.

Cruz also competed in the same stroke at the 1992 Summer Olympics in Barcelona, this time she swam in a time of 1:21.50 and finished in forty-first place beating Elke Talma from the Seychelles and Nguyễn Thị Phương from Vietnam who was disqualified.

Four years later at the 1996 Summer Olympics in Atlanta, she competed in the 100 metres breaststroke which she swam in 1:16.62 and finished 43rd out of 46 swimmers, she also swam in the 200 metres breaststroke and she finished 37th out of 40 starters.

Twelve years after competing in her first Olympics, Cruz qualified for her fourth Angolan team in the women's 100 m breaststroke, as a 25-year-old, at the 2000 Summer Olympics in Sydney. Because of her remarkable record and legacy, she became the nation's flag bearer in the opening ceremony. She also received a ticket from FINA, under an Olympic Solidarity and Universality program, in an entry time of 1:14.00. She challenged seven other swimmers in heat two, including Bolivia's 26-year-old Katerine Moreno, who also competed with her in their Olympic debut back in 1988. Coming from last at the initial turn, she held off a sprint challenge from Papua New Guinea's Xenia Peni on the final stretch to pick up a seventh seed in a time of 1:19.57. Cruz failed to advance into the semifinals, as she placed thirty-eighth overall in the prelims.

Olympic Games
Preceded by Palmira Barbosa	Flagbearer for Angola; 2000 Sydney	Succeeded by Ângelo Victoriano
