= Maura Faial =

Angolan handball player

Personal information
- Full name: Maura Fátima Santos Faial
- Nationality: Angolan
- Born: 7 July 1970 (age 56)

Sport
- Sport: Handball
National team
- Years: Team
- –: Angola
Medal record
African Championship
Gold medal – first place	1989 Algeria

Maura Fátima Santos Faial (born 7 July 1970) is an Angolan handball player.

She competed at the 1996 Summer Olympics, where Angola placed 7th. She was also part of the Angolan team at the 2000 Summer Olympics.
