= Elizabeth Cailo =

Angolan handball player

Personal information
- Nationality: Angolan
- Born: 2 July 1987 (age 39)
- Height: 1.75 m (5 ft 9 in)

Sport
- Sport: Handball
- Position: Left wing
- Current club: Primeiro de Agosto
- Number: 7
National team
Years	Team	Apps	(Gls)
–	Angola	7	(20)
Medal record
African Championship
Gold medal – first place	2018 Brazzaville
African Games
Gold medal – first place	2015 Brazzaville	Team

Elizabeth Jurema Faro Cailo (born 2 July 1987) is an Angolan handball player who plays for the club Primeiro de Agosto. She is member of the Angolan national team. She competed at the 2015 World Women's Handball Championship in Denmark.
