= Maria Pedro =

Angolan handball player

Personal information
- Full name: Maria Rosa da Costa Pedro
- Nationality: Angolan
- Born: 29 December 1982 (age 43)
- Height: 1.72 m (5 ft 8 in)

Sport
- Sport: Handball
- Position: Goalkeeper
- Current club: Petro Atlético
- Number: 16
National team
| Years | Team | Apps | (Gls) |
| – | Angola | 68 | (0) |
Medal record
All-Africa Games
| Gold medal – first place | Maputo 2011 | National Team |

Maria Rosa da Costa Pedro (born 29 December 1982) is a retired Angolan handball player. She plays for the club Atlético Luanda, and on the Angolan national team. She represented Angola at the 2013 World Women's Handball Championship in Serbia.
