= Cristina Branco (handballer) =

Angolan handball player

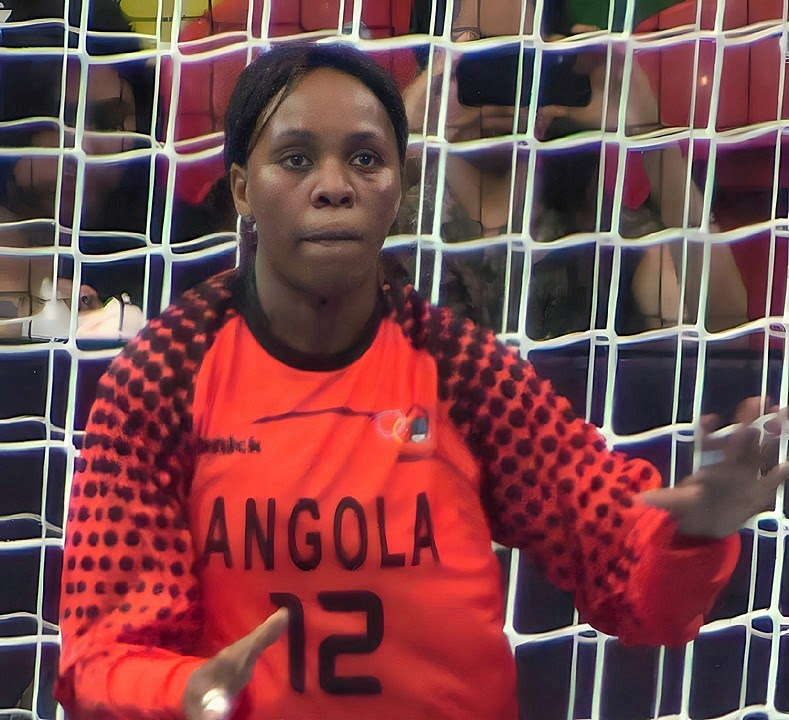

Personal information
- Full name: Cristina Direito Branco
- Nationality: Angolan
- Born: 15 March 1985 (age 41) Luanda, Angola
- Height: 1.72 m (5 ft 8 in)

Sport
- Sport: Handball
- Position: Goalkeeper
- Current club: Primeiro de Agosto
- Number: 12
National team
Years	Team	Apps	(Gls)
–	Angola	66	(0)
Medal record
African Championship
Gold medal – first place	2012 Salé
Gold medal – first place	2018 Brazzaville
African Games
Gold medal – first place	2015 Brazzaville	Team

Cristina Direito Branco a.k.a. Branca (born 15 March 1985) is an Angolan handball player for Primeiro de Agosto and Angolan national team.

She plays on the Angola women's national handball team and participated at the 2011 and 2013 World Women's Handball Championships in Brazil and Serbia. She competed for the Angolan team at the 2012 Summer Olympics in London. She also competed for the Angolan team at the 2016 Summer Olympics in Rio de Janeiro. She was the flag bearer for Angola during the closing ceremonies in Rio.

She plays for the club 1º de Agosto.
