= Mária Eduardo =

Angolan handball player

Personal information
- Full name: Mária Teresa Joaquim Eduardo
- Nationality: Angolan
- Born: 17 September 1973 (age 53)

Sport
- Sport: Handball
- Position: Playmaker
National team
- Years: Team
- –: Angola

Mária Teresa Joaquim Eduardo (born 17 September 1973) is a retired Angolan female handball player.

She competed at the 1996 Summer Olympics, where Angola placed 7th. She was also part of the Angolan team at the 2008 Summer Olympics.
