= Justina Praça =

Angolan handball player (born 1979)

Personal information
- Full name: Justina Lopes Praça
- Nationality: Angolan
- Born: 26 May 1979 (age 47) Quilengues
- Height: 1.75

Sport
- Sport: Handball
- Position: Goalkeeper
National team
- Years: Team
- –: Angola

Justina Lopes Praça (born 26 May 1979) is a retired Angolan female handball player.

She competed at the 1996 Summer Olympics, where Angola placed 7th. She was also part of the Angolan team at the 2000 Summer Olympics.
