= Marta Santos =

Angolan handball player

Personal information
- Full name: Marta Florença Casimiro dos Santos
- Nationality: Angolan
- Born: 25 December 1988 (age 37)
- Height: 1.69 m (5 ft 7 in)

Sport
- Sport: Handball
- Position: Left wing
- Current club: Petro de Luanda
- Number: 20
National team
| Years | Team | Apps | (Gls) |
| – | Angola | 19 | (12) |
Medal record
African Games
| Gold medal – first place | Brazzaville 2015 | National Team |

Marta Florença Casimiro dos Santos (born 25 December 1988, Luanda) is an Angolan handball player. She plays for the club Petro de Luanda and on the Angolan national team. She competed for the Angolan team at the 2012 Summer Olympics in London.
