= Elizabeth Viegas =

Angolan handball player

Personal information
- Nationality: Anolan
- Born: 20 January 1985 (age 41) Luanda, Angola
- Height: 1.80 m (5 ft 11 in)

Sport
- Sport: Handball
- Position: Pivot
- Current club: Primeiro de Agosto
- Number: 15

Senior clubs
- Years: Team
- 2008–2012: ASA
- 2012–: Primeiro de Agosto
National team
Years	Team	Apps	(Gls)
–	Angola	4	(15)
Medal record
African Games
Gold medal – first place	Brazzaville 2015	National Team

Elizabeth Amélia Basílio Viegas (born 20 January 1985) is an Angolan handball player. She plays for Angolan side Primeiro de Agosto. Elizabeth also played for the Angolan national team.
