= Vivaldo Eduardo =

Angolan handball player and coach (born 1966)

Personal information
- Full name: Vivaldo Francisco Eduardo
- Nationality: Angolan
- Born: 11 September 1966 (age 60)

Sport
- Sport: Handball
- Current club: Petro Atlético (Manager)
National team
- Years: Team
- –: Angola (Manager)

Vivaldo Francisco Eduardo (born 11 September 1966), is a handball coach. He has been the head coach of the Angola women's national handball team at the 2011 and 2013 World Women's Handball Championships in Brazil and Serbia.

Vivaldo is the spouse of Angolan team handball former star player Marcelina Kiala.
