= Fernando Lopes (swimmer) =

Angolan swimmer (1964–2020)

Personal information
- Born: 21 November 1964
- Died: 11 October 2020 (aged 55) Luanda, Angola

Sport
- Sport: Swimming

Fernando Lopes (21 November 1964 – 11 October 2020) was an Angolan swimmer. He competed in the men's 4 × 100 metre medley relay at the 1980 Summer Olympics. Lopes became the first ever flag bearer for Angola when he carried the flag in the 1980 opening ceremony. At the age of 15, he was the youngest athlete in the delegation from Angola. After his athletic career, he worked in the aviation industry.

Lopes died in October 2020 at the age of 55.
