= Marcelina Kiala =

Angolan handball player

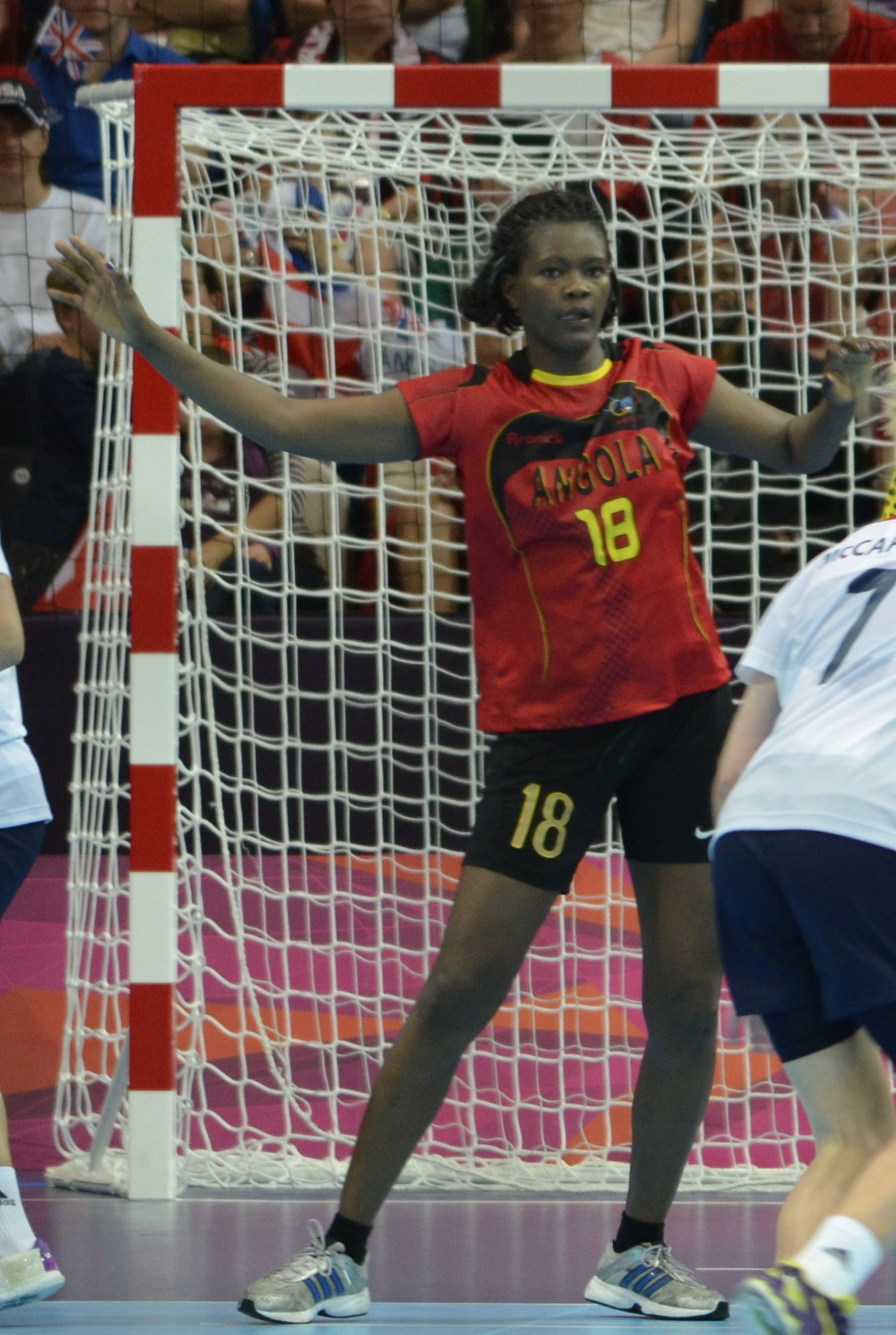
- Kiala in 2012

Personal information
- Nationality: Angolan
- Born: 9 November 1979 (age 46) Luanda, Angola
- Height: 1.80 m (5 ft 11 in)

Sport
- Sport: Handball
- Position: Left back
- Current club: Retired

Senior clubs
- Years: Team
- –2004: Cercle Dijon Bourgogne
- 2004–2014: Atlético Petróleos de Luanda
National team
| Years | Team | Apps | (Gls) |
| – | Angola | 89 | (246) |
Medal record
African Championship
| Gold medal – first place | 2012 Salé | Team competition |
All-Africa Games
| Gold medal – first place | 2011 Maputo | Team competition |

Marcelina Kiala (born 9 November 1979) is a retired Angolan handball player and a former member of the Angola women's national handball team. Kiala competed at the 2000 Summer Olympics and 2012 Summer Olympics, 2005 and 2007 World Women's Handball Championship.

She is the sister of fellow Angolan women's handball player, Luisa Kiala, half-sister of Natália Bernardo and the wife of former Angolan handball coach Vivaldo Eduardo.
