= Neyde Barbosa =

Angolan handball player

Personal information
- Full name: Neyde Marisa Pina Barbosa
- Nationality: Angolan
- Born: 23 September 1980 (age 46) Benguela, Angola
- Height: 1.80 m (5 ft 11 in)

Sport
- Sport: Handball
- Position: Goalkeeper
- Current club: Progresso do Sambizanga
- Number: 1

Senior clubs
- Years: Team
- –: Académica do Lobito
- –: Petro Atlético
- –: Progresso do Sambizanga
National team
Years	Team	Apps	(Gls)
–	Angola	38	(1)
Medal record
African Championship
Gold medal – first place	Salé 2012
Gold medal – first place	Luanda 2016	National Team
All-Africa Games
Gold medal – first place	Maputo 2011	National Team

Neyde Marisa Pina Barbosa (born 23 September 1980) is an Angolan handball player. She plays on the Angola women's national handball team and participated at the 2011 World Women's Handball Championship in Brazil, and the 2004, 2012 and 2016 Summer Olympics.
