= Palmira Barbosa =

Angolan handball player

Personal information
- Born: 25 November 1961 (age 64) Luanda, Angola

Career information
- Playing career: 1985–2002
- Position: Left back

Career history
- 1985–1996: Ferroviário de Luanda
- 1996–2000: Petro Atlético
- 2000–2002: ENANA

Palmira Leitão de Almeida Barbosa, nicknamed Mirita, born 25 November 1961, is an Angolan handball player. She began her career at Clube Ferroviário de Luanda in the 1980s and in 1996 moved to Petro Atlético. She joined the Angolan handball squad in 1980, making her international debut at the world cup in South Korea in 1990. She has since played three more world cups. In February 2000, at the age of 39, she announced her retirement and her desire to pursue a coaching career. She later reconsidered and played for two more seasons with the newly formed club ENANA.

== Achievements ==
Throughout her career she won 8 Africa club championships with Petro Atlético, 4 African Championships for Angola, 3 all-Africa games titles, as well as participation in 4 world cups and 1 Olympic games (1996).

In 1998, the African Handball Confederation voted her the Best Female Handball Player of all times.

== Politics ==
At present, she is a member of parliament for the ruling party MPLA.

Following the Angolan elections in 2022, she has been appointed as Minister of Sports and Youth.

Olympic Games
Preceded by João N'Tyamba	Flagbearer for Angola; 1996 Atlanta	Succeeded by Nádia Cruz
