= Domingas Cordeiro =

Angolan handball player

Personal information
- Nationality: Angolan
- Born: 1 May 1976 (age 50)

Sport
- Sport: Handball
National team
- Years: Team
- –: Angola

Domingas Cordeiro (born 1 May 1976) is an Angolan handball player.

She competed at the 1996 Summer Olympics, where Angola placed 7th. She was also part of the Angolan team at the 2000 Summer Olympics.
