= Ilda Bengue =

Angolan handball player

Personal information
- Full name: Ilda Maria Bengue
- Nationality: Angolan
- Born: 30 October 1974 (age 51) Luanda, Angola
- Height: 1.77 m (5 ft 10 in)

Sport
- Sport: Handball
- Position: Back player

Senior clubs
- Years: Team
- 2000-2002: Petro Atlético
- 2002-2004: Dijon
- 2005-2011: Petro Atlético
- 2012-2013: ASA
National team
- Years: Team
- –: Angola
Medal record
African Championship
Gold medal – first place	2004 Morocco
Gold medal – first place	2006 Tunisia
Gold medal – first place	Luanda 2008	Team

Ilda Maria Bengue (born 30 October 1974) is a retired Angolan handball player.

== Summer Olympics ==
Bengue played for Angola at the 2000 and 2004 Summer Olympics in Athens, in which she ranked 4th with 38 goals and at the 2008 Summer Olympics in Beijing.

== World Cup ==
She competed in the 2005 and 2007 World Championships, the latter in which Angola finished 7th, (the country's best performance ever) with Bengue scoring 56 goals and ranking 9th on the championship's list of top scorers.

Yahoo! Sports Profile
