= Anica Neto =

Angolan handball player

Personal information
- Full name: Anica Manuel Joâo Neto
- Nationality: Angolan
- Born: December 27, 1972 (age 53) Luanda, Angola
- Height: 1.81 m (5 ft 11 in)

Sport
- Sport: Handball
- Position: Pivot

Senior clubs
- Years: Team
- 1984-: Desportivo da TAAG
- -: Petro Atlético
National team
- Years: Team
- –: Angola
Medal record
African Championship
Gold medal – first place	2004 Egypt

Anica Manuel João Neto a.k.a. Nequita (born December 27, 1972) is a former Angolan handball player. Neto was a member of the Angola women's handball team and represented her country in three different Olympic tournaments, namely in 1996, 2000 and 2004, before retiring in 2005.
