= Isabel Fernandes =

Angolan handball player (born 1985)

Personal information
- Full name: Isabel Sambovo Fernandes
- Nationality: Angolan
- Born: 5 June 1985 (age 41)
- Height: 1.80 m (5 ft 11 in)

Sport
- Sport: Handball
- Position: Left Back
National team
- Years: Team
- –: Angola
Medal record
African Championship
| Gold medal – first place | Cairo 2004 | Team |
| Gold medal – first place | Tunis 2006 | Team |
| Gold medal – first place | Angola 2008 | Team |
| Gold medal – first place | Cairo/Suez 2010 | Team |
| Gold medal – first place | Salé 2012 | Team |
All-Africa Games
| Gold medal – first place | Maputo 2011 | National Team |

Isabel Sambovo Fernandes, a.k.a. Belezura (born 5 June 1985) is a former team handball player from Angola. She was a member of the Angola women's national handball team, and participated at the 2011 World Women's Handball Championship in Brazil as well as at the 2004, 2008 and 2012 summer olympics.

Belezura is a 5 time African champion, having won such titles in 2004, 2006, 2008, 2010 and 2012.

Belezura was the top scorer at the 2005 Women's Junior World Handball Championship.

She last played for Angolan side Petro Atlético.

== See also ==
- List of Angola international handball players
