= Elisa Webba =

Angolan handball player

Personal information
- Full name: Elisa Manuela Brito Webba Torres
- Nationality: Angolan
- Born: May 25, 1969 (age 57) Luanda, Angola
- Height: 1.81 m (5 ft 11 in)

Sport
- Sport: Handball
- Position: Pivot

Senior clubs
- Years: Team
- 1987-1984: INEF
- 1984–1986: BCR
- 1987-: Ferrovia
- 1990-2004: Petro Atlético
National team
- Years: Team
- –: Angola
Medal record
African Championship
Gold medal – first place	Algiers 1989	Angola
Gold medal – first place	2002 Morocco
Gold medal – first place	2004 Egypt
Clubs Champions Cup
Gold medal – first place	Owerri 1987	Ferroviário

Elisa Manuela Brito Webba Torres, nicknamed Lilí (born May 25, 1965 in Luanda) is a retired Angolan handball player. She began her career at the Instituto Nacional de Educação Física (INEF) in 1982. In 1990 she moved to Petro Atlético where she won many titles. She has also been a prominent member and the captain of the Angola women's national handball team.

== Summer Olympics ==
Lilí competed for Angola at the 1996, 2000 and 2004 Summer olympics.
