= Natália Bernardo =

Angolan handball player (born 1986)

Personal information
- Full name: Natália María Bernardo dos Santos
- Nationality: Angolan
- Born: 25 December 1986 (age 39) Luanda, Angola
- Height: 1.73 m (5 ft 8 in)

Sport
- Sport: Handball
- Position: Centre back
- Current club: Primeiro de Agosto
- Number: 9

Senior clubs
- Years: Team
- –: Desportivo Maculusso
- –: Atlético Petróleos de Luanda
- –: Primeiro de Agosto
National team
Years	Team	Apps	(Gls)
–	Angola	300	(248)
Medal record
African Championship
Gold medal – first place	2012 Salé
Gold medal – first place	2016 Luanda
Gold medal – first place	2021 Yaoundé
Gold medal – first place	2022 Dakar
All-Africa Games
Gold medal – first place	2011 Maputo	Team
- Updated on 10 November 2025

Natália María Bernardo dos Santos (born 25 December 1986) is an Angolan handball player for Primeiro de Agosto and the Angola women's national handball team.

She participated at the 2011 and 2013 World Women's Handball Championships in Brazil and Serbia, and the 2008, 2012 and 2016 Summer Olympics.

Natália was named the best player of the 2016 African Women's Handball Championship.

== Personal life ==
Natália is a half-sister to fellow handball players Marcelina Kiala and Luísa Kiala.

== Achievements ==
- Carpathian Trophy:
  - Winner: 2019

Olympic Games
Preceded by Luísa Kiala	Flag bearer for Angola; 2020 Tokyo with Matias Montinho	Succeeded by Edmilson Pedro; Azenaide Carlos
