= João N'Tyamba =

Angolan runner

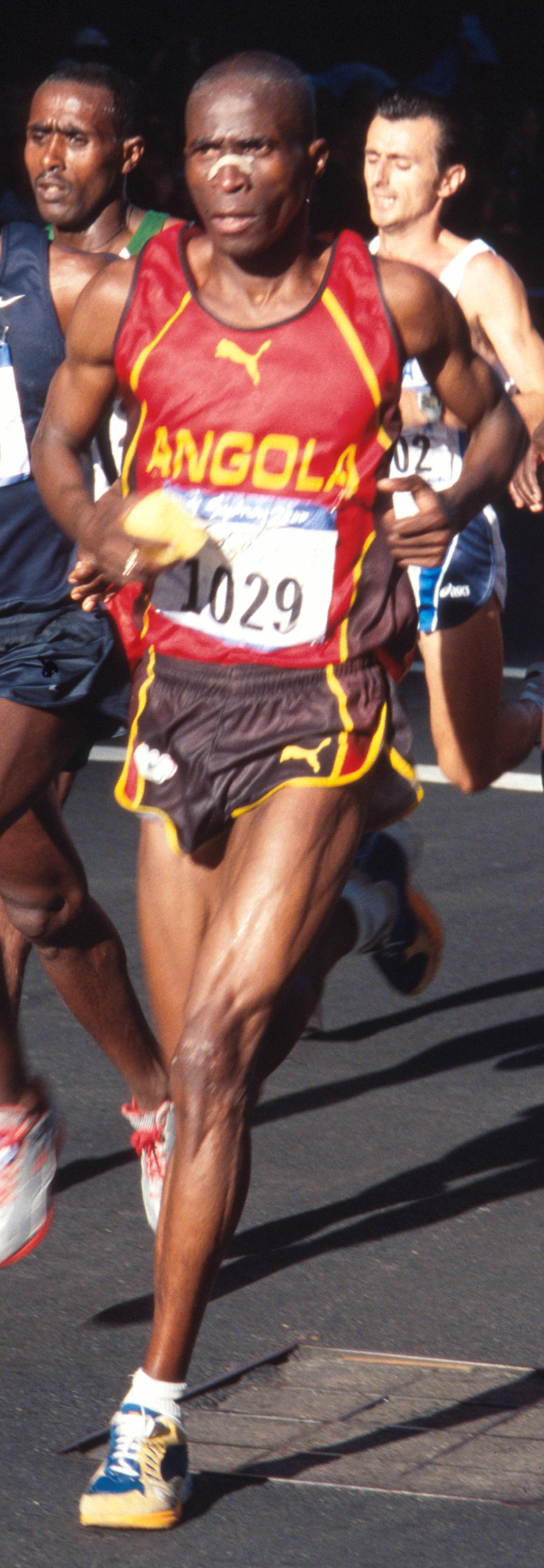
- N'Tyamba competing in the Sydney Olympics 2000

Personal information
- Born: João Baptista N'Tyamba; 20 March 1968 (age 58) Lubango, Huíla, Angola
- Height: 5 ft 10 in (178 cm)

Sport
- Country: Angola
- Sport: Track and field

João Baptista N'Tyamba (born 20 March 1968) is an Angolan runner. He was born in Lubango.

He started as a middle-distance runner and competed in the 800 meters at 1988 Summer Olympics. He then competed in the 1500 metres at the 1991 World Championships, the 1992 Summer Olympics, and the 1996 Summer Olympics and, in 3000 metres, at the 1995 IAAF World Indoor Championships. He never reached the final in any of these events.

He then shifted to the longer distances, competing in 10,000 metres at the World Championships in 1997, 1999, and 2001, with a thirteenth place from 1999 as his best finish. He competed in the marathon at two consecutive Olympic Games, placing seventeenth in 2000 and 53rd in 2004.

N'Tyamba holds the Angolan records in 800 metres, 1000 metres, 1500 metres, 3000 metres, 10,000 metres, half marathon, and marathon.

When N'Tyamba competed in the marathon at 2008 Olympics he became the first male track and field athlete to compete at six Olympics. The other track and field athletes who have competed at six Olympics are Merlene Ottey, Lia Manoliu, Tessa Sanderson, and Maria Mutola.

== Achievements ==
Year	Competition	Venue	Position	Event	Notes
Representing Angola
1988	Olympic Games	Seoul, South Korea	56th (h)	800 m	1:53.23
1991	World Championships	Tokyo, Japan	–	800 m	DQ
1991	World Championships	Tokyo, Japan	22nd (sf)	1500 m	3:44.64
1992	Olympic Games	Barcelona, Spain	20th (h)	1500 m	3:39.54
1995	World Indoor Championships	Barcelona, Spain	16th (h)	3000 m	8:03.93
1996	Ibero-American Championships	Medellín, Colombia	5th	1500 m	3:45.41
1996	Olympic Games	Atlanta, United States	44th (h)	1500 m	3:46.41
1997	World Championships	Athens, Greece	25th (h)	10,000 m	29:38.92
1999	World Championships	Seville, Spain	13th	10,000 m	28:31.09
2000	Olympic Games	Sydney, Australia	17th	Marathon	2:16:43
2001	World Championships	Edmonton, Canada	20th	10,000 m	28:38.31
2003	World Championships	Paris, France	—	Marathon	DNF
2003	All-Africa Games	Abuja, Nigeria	8th	Marathon	2:33:19
2004	Olympic Games	Athens, Greece	53rd	Marathon	2:23:26
2008	Olympic Games	Beijing, China	–	Marathon	DNF

Olympic Games
Preceded by First	Flagbearer for Angola; 1988 Seoul	Succeeded by Palmira Barbosa
Olympic Games
Preceded by Ângelo Victoriano	Flagbearer for Angola; 2008 Beijing	Succeeded by Antónia Moreira
