= Filomena Trindade =

Angolan handball player

Personal information
- Full name: Filomena José Trindade
- Nationality: Angolan
- Born: 26 September 1971 (age 55) Benguela, Angola
- Height: 1.65 m (5 ft 5 in)

Sport
- Sport: Handball
- Position: Right Wing

Senior clubs
- Years: Team
- –: Nacional de Benguela
- –: Educação de Benguela
- –: Petro Atlético
National team
- Years: Team
- –: Angola
Medal record
African Championship
Gold medal – first place	2002 Morocco
Gold medal – first place	2004 Egypt
Gold medal – first place	2004 Tunisia
Gold medal – first place	2008 Luanda

Filomena José Trindade, a.k.a. Filó (born 26 September 1971) is an Angolan retired female handball player. Filó was a member of the Angola women's handball team. At club level, she excelled at Angolan side Petro Atlético, a club with which she won several African club championship titles.

== Summer Olympics ==
Filó competed for Angola at the 1996, 2000, 2004 and 2008 Summer olympics.

Filó is a three-time MVP award winner at the African Women's Handball Championship.

Filomena Trindade has currently been serving a term as a member of the parliament for the ruling party, MPLA.
