= Luísa Kiala =

Angolan handball player

Personal information
- Nationality: Angolan
- Born: 25 January 1982 (age 44) Luanda, Angola
- Height: 1.80 m (5 ft 11 in)

Sport
- Sport: Handball
- Position: Left back
- Current club: Primeiro de Agosto
- Number: 11

Senior clubs
- Years: Team
- –: Maculusso
- –: Petro de Luanda
- –: Primeiro de Agosto
National team
Years	Team	Apps	(Gls)
–	Angola	110	(197)
Medal record
African Championship
Gold medal – first place	Salé 2012
Gold medal – first place	Luanda 2016	National Team
All-Africa Games
Gold medal – first place	2011 Maputo	National Team

Luisa Kiala (born 25 January 1982) is an Angolan handball player. She is a member of the Angola women's national handball team and participated at the 2011 and 2013 World Women's Handball Championships in Brazil and Serbia.

She competed at the 2004 Summer Olympics in Athens, where Angola placed 9th, at the 2008 Summer Olympics in Beijing, where Angola placed 12th, at the 2012 Summer Olympics, where Angola placed 10th and at the 2016 Summer Olympics, where Angola placed 8th.

She is a sister to fellow handball player Marcelina Kiala and half-sister of Natália Bernardo.

Olympic Games
Preceded by Antónia Moreira	Flagbearer for Angola; Rio de Janeiro 2016	Succeeded by Natália Bernardo; Matias Montinho
