= Ângelo Victoriano =

Angolan basketball player (1968–2024)

Personal information
- Born: 8 February 1968 Luanda, Portuguese Angola
- Died: 13 April 2024 (aged 56) Luanda, Angola
- Listed height: 6 ft 6 in (1.98 m)
- Listed weight: 247 lb (112 kg)

Career information
- Playing career: 1982–2006
- Position: Center
- Coaching career: 2007–2009

Career history

Playing
- 1982–1992: Petro de Luanda
- 1992–1993: Queluz
- 1993–1995: Barreirense
- 1995–1996: ASA
- 1996–1997: Petro de Luanda
- 1997–2006: Primeiro de Agosto

Coaching
- 2007–2009: Primeiro de Agosto (assistant)

Career highlights
- As player: 11× Angolan League champion (1989, 1990, 1992, 1996, 1997, 2000–2005); 7× Angolan Cup winner (1990, 1991, 1997, 2002, 2003, 2005, 2006); 6× Angolan Supercup winner (1997, 2001–2005); As assistant coach: Angolan League champion (2009); 2× Angolan Cup winner (2008, 2009); 2× Angolan Supercup winner (2007, 2008)
- FIBA Hall of Fame
Medals
Men's basketball
Representing Angola
FIBA Africa Under-18 Championship
Silver medal – second place	Abuja 1987	Angola (U-18)
AfroBasket
Gold medal – first place	Luanda 1989	Angola
Gold medal – first place	Cairo 1992	Angola
Gold medal – first place	Nairobi 1993	Angola
Gold medal – first place	Algiers 1995	Angola
Gold medal – first place	Luanda 1999	Angola
Gold medal – first place	Luanda 2001	Angola
Gold medal – first place	Alexandria 2003	Angola
Gold medal – first place	Algiers 2005	Angola
Bronze medal – third place	Tunis 1987	Angola
Bronze medal – third place	Dakar 1997	Angola
FIBA Africa Clubs Champions Cup
Gold medal – first place	Luanda 2002	1º de Agosto
Gold medal – first place	Cairo 2004	1º de Agosto
Silver medal – second place	Lagos 2006	1º de Agosto
Bronze medal – third place	Abidjan 2005	1º de Agosto

Ângelo Monteiro dos Santos Victoriano (8 February 1968 – 13 April 2024) was an Angolan basketball player. He was listed at 6 ft 6 in (1.98 m) and 247 lbs. (112 kg). Victoriano was inducted to the FIBA Basketball Hall of Fame in 2023 as the second Angolan player in history. Victoriano holds the record for most FIBA AfroBasket titles in history with eight titles, and in his club career in Angola he won eleven national championships and ten national cups.

Victoriano appeared on four Angolan Olympic basketball teams (in 1992, 1996, 2000, and 2004), serving as captain in his final appearance.

== Playing career ==
Born in the Maçal neighbourhood of Luanda, Victoriano began playing with Petro de Luanda in the top division at age 14. At the club level, he won a total of 11 national championship titles, one with ASA, four with Petro de Luanda and six with Primeiro de Agosto. He won ten Angolan Cups, eight Super Cups and two Africa Club Championships with Primeiro de Agosto.

Victoriano was the only African player to have won eight FIBA Africa championships, ahead of Jean-Jacques Conceição, and Carlos Almeida, both with seven.

== Coaching career ==
From 2007 to 2009, Victoriano was an assistant coach under Luís Magalhães for Primeiro de Agosto and won the 2009 Unitel Basket title with them.

== Personal ==
Victoriano died on 13 April 2024, aged 56, in Luanda following a long illness caused by diabetes.

His brothers, Edmar Victoriano and Puna Victoriano, also played for the Angola national basketball team.
