= Angolan Olympic Committee =

- Country: Angola
- Code: ANG
- Created: 17 February 1979
- Recognized: 1980
- Continental Association: ANOCA
- Headquarters: Luanda, Angola
- President: Gustavo Dias Vaz da Conceição
- Secretary General: António Pedro Garcia Monteiro
- Website: www.comiteolimpicoangolano.com/pt

The Angolan Olympic Committee (Portuguese: Comité Olímpico Angolano) (IOC code: ANG) is the National Olympic Committee representing Angola. It was created on 17 February 1979 and recognized by the International Olympic Committee in February 1980.

== History ==
The committee was founded on 17 February 1979 and was recognised provisionally by the Executive Board of the IOC at Nagoya, Japan in October 1979. This recognition was confirmed at the 82nd Session of the IOC at Lake Placid in February 1980.

== Presidents ==
President	Term
Augusto Lopes Texeira	1979-1980
Augusto Germano de Araujo	1981-1992
Rogerio Torres Cerveira Nunes da Silva	1993-2004
Gustavo Dias Vaz da Conceição	2004–2025
Pedro Celestino de Sousa Godinho	2025–present

== See also ==
- Angola at the Olympics
