= 2019 African Women's Handball Champions League =

Tournament details
- Host country: Cape Verde
- Venues: 2 (in 1 host city)
- Dates: 4–13 August 2019
- Teams: 9 (from 1 confederation)

Final positions
- Champions: (Angola) 1º de Agosto (6th title)
- Runners-up: (Angola) Petro Atlético
- Third place: (Republic of the Congo) ABO Sport
- Fourth place: (Republic of the Congo) DGSP

Tournament statistics
- Matches played: 28

The 2019 African Women's Handball Champions League was the 41st edition, organized by the African Handball Confederation, under the auspices of the International Handball Federation, the handball sport governing body. The tournament was held from October 4–13, 2019 at the Pavilhão Vavá Duarte and Pavilhão Craveiro Lopes in Praia, Cape Verde, contested by 8 teams and won by Clube Desportivo Primeiro de Agosto of Angola.

== Draw ==
| Group A | Group B |
|---|---|
| (Ivory Coast) Bandama (Republic of the Congo) DGSP (Cameroon) FAP Yaoundé (Democratic Republic of the Congo) HC Héritage (Angola) Primeiro de Agosto | (Republic of the Congo) ABO Sport (Cape Verde) Atlético do Mindelo (Angola) Petro Atlético |

== Preliminary round ==
Times given below are in CVT UTC+1.

=== Group A ===
Fri, 4 Oct 2019
| DGSP (Republic of the Congo) | 32 (15:14) 28 | (Ivory Coast) Bandama |
Sat, 5 Oct 2019
| DGSP (Republic of the Congo) | 28 (15:13) 28 | (Cameroon) FAP Yaoundé |
Sun, 6 Oct 2019
| 1º de Agosto (Angola) | 36 (15:05) 14 | (Cameroon) FAP Yaoundé |
| HC Héritage (Democratic Republic of the Congo) | 29 (12:15) 27 | (Ivory Coast) Bandama |
Mon, 7 Oct 2019
| DGSP (Republic of the Congo) | 40 (19:11) 28 | (Democratic Republic of the Congo) HC Héritage |
| 1º de Agosto (Angola) | 39 (19:07) 17 | (Ivory Coast) Bandama |
Tue, 8 Oct 2019
| Bandama (Ivory Coast) | 27 (15:10) 29 | (Cameroon) FAP Yaoundé |
| 1º de Agosto (Angola) | 40 (20:05) 13 | (Democratic Republic of the Congo) HC Héritage |
Wed, 9 Oct 2019
| HC Héritage (Democratic Republic of the Congo) | 26 (12:18) 35 | (Cameroon) FAP Yaoundé |
| 1º de Agosto (Angola) | 36 (16:09) 13 | (Republic of the Congo) DGSP |

| Team | Pld | W | D | L | GF | GA | GDIF | Pts |
|---|---|---|---|---|---|---|---|---|
| (Angola) 1º de Agosto | 4 | 4 | 0 | 0 | 151 | 57 | +94 | 8 |
| (Republic of the Congo) DGSP | 4 | 2 | 1 | 1 | 113 | 120 | -7 | 5 |
| (Cameroon) FAP Yaoundé | 4 | 2 | 1 | 1 | 106 | 117 | -11 | 5 |
| (Democratic Republic of the Congo) HC Héritage | 4 | 1 | 0 | 3 | 96 | 142 | -46 | 2 |
| (Ivory Coast) Bandama | 4 | 0 | 0 | 4 | 99 | 129 | -30 | 0 |

* Note: Advance to semi-finals * Note: Advance to quarter-finals

| PRI | DGS | FAP | HER | BAN |
|---|---|---|---|---|
| — | 36–13 | 36–14 | 40–13 | 39–17 |
| 13–36 | — | 28–28 | 40–28 | 32–28 |
| 14–36 | 28–28 | — | 35–26 | 29–27 |
| 13–40 | 28–40 | 26–35 | — | 29–27 |
| 17–39 | 28–32 | 27–29 | 27–29 | — |

=== Group B ===
Sat, 5 Oct 2019
| ABO Sport (Republic of the Congo) | 38 (16:08) 21 | (Cape Verde) Atl Mindelo |
Tue, 8 Oct 2019
| Petro Atlético (Angola) | 26 (14:15) 25 | (Republic of the Congo) ABO Sport |
Wed, 9 Oct 2019
| Petro Atlético (Angola) | 37 (19:03) 09 | (Cape Verde) Atl Mindelo |

| Team | Pld | W | D | L | GF | GA | GDIF | Pts |
|---|---|---|---|---|---|---|---|---|
| (Angola) Petro Atlético | 2 | 2 | 0 | 0 | 63 | 34 | +29 | 4 |
| (Republic of the Congo) ABO Sport | 2 | 1 | 0 | 1 | 63 | 47 | +16 | 2 |
| (Cape Verde) Atlético do Mindelo | 2 | 0 | 0 | 2 | 30 | 75 | -45 | 0 |

* Note: Advance to quarter-finals

| PET | ABO | ATL |
|---|---|---|
| — | 26–25 | 37–9 |
| 25–26 | — | 38–21 |
| 9–37 | 21–38 | — |

== Knockout stage ==
=== Quarter-finals ===
Thu, 10 Oct 2019
| ABO Sport (Angola) | 24 (11:09) 22 | (Cameroon) FAP Yaoundé |
| DGSP (Republic of the Congo) | 30 (14:09) 23 | (Cape Verde) Atl Mindelo |
| Petro Atlético (Cameroon) | 32 (14:11) 16 | (Democratic Republic of the Congo) HC Héritage |

=== Semi-finals ===
Sat, 12 Oct 2019
| DGSP (Republic of the Congo) | 19 (06:13) 24 | (Angola) Petro Atlético |
| 1º de Agosto (Angola) | 32 (14:10) 24 | (Republic of the Congo) ABO Sport |

=== 5th place ===
Sun, 13 Oct 2019
| FAP Yaoundé (Cameroon) | 38 (18:11) 27 | (Democratic Republic of the Congo) HC Héritage |

=== 3rd place ===
Sun, 13 Oct 2019
| ABO Sport (Republic of the Congo) | 29 (13:15) 28 | (Republic of the Congo) DGSP |

=== Final ===
| Sun, 13 Oct 2019; 17:00 (UTC+1) | 1º de Agosto (Angola) | 18–16 | (Angola) Petro Atlético | Vavá Duarte, Praia |
| Sun, 13 Oct 2019; 17:00 (UTC+1) | Isabel Guialo 5 | (6–8) | Azenaide Carlos 6 | Vavá Duarte, Praia |
| Sun, 13 Oct 2019; 17:00 (UTC+1) | 3× (suspension) | | 5× (suspension) | Vavá Duarte, Praia |

| GK | 1 | (Cuba) Eneleidys Guevara |
| RW | 2 | (Angola) Mafuta Pedro |
| LW | 3 | (Angola) Iracelma Silva | 3/1 |
| CB | 4 | (Angola) Helena Paulo | 9/5 |
| RB | 6 | (Angola) Juliana Machado | 5/1 |
| B | 8 | (Angola) Ruth João |
| LW | 9 | (Angola) Natália Bernardo | 5/3 |
| RB | 11 | (Angola) Vilma Silva | 2/0 |
| P | 11 | (Angola) Albertina Kassoma | 4/1 |
| P | 15 | (Angola) Liliana Venâncio | 1/1 | Suspension |
| GK | 16 | (Angola) Helena Sousa |
| RW | 18 | (Angola) Claudete José | 1/0 |
| RB | 19 | (Angola) Wuta Dombaxe | 3/1 |
| GK | 20 | (Angola) Amália Pinto |
| LB | 23 | (Democratic Republic of the Congo) Christianne Mwasesa | 3/0 |
| CB | 90 | (Angola) Isabel Guialo | 6/5 | Suspension |
Coach:
| | | (Denmark) Morten Soubak |

Stats

| 1º de Agosto | Statistics | Petro Atlético |
|---|---|---|
| 18/39 | Goals | 16/32 |
| 46% | Scoring % | 50% |
| 7/4 | 7m penalty | 4/3 |
| 6 min | Suspensions | 10 min |
| 0 | Yellow cards | 0 |
| 0 | Red cards | 0 |
| – | Saves | – |
| | Saving % | |

| CB | 2 | (Angola) Vilma Nenganga | 4/3 |
| LW | 3 | (Angola) Emingarda Ferreira |
| CB | 4 | (Angola) Delfina Mungongo | 4/3 |
| RW | 6 | (Angola) Natália Kamalandua | 4/0 |
| RW | 7 | (Angola) Edith Mbunga | | Suspension |
| RB | 9 | (Angola) Manuela Paulino | 4/2 | Suspension |
| RW | 10 | (Angola) Alexandra Chaca |
| CB | 11 | (Angola) Marília Quizelete | 1/0 |
| GK | 12 | (Angola) Filigênia Fernandes |
| – | 13 | (Angola) |
| P | 14 | (Angola) Ríssia Oliveira | 2/1 | Suspension |
| RB | 15 | (Angola) Azenaide Carlos | 10/6 | Suspension |
| GK | 16 | (Angola) Teresa Almeida |
| LB | 21 | (Angola) Magda Cazanga | 3/1 |
| GK | 22 | (Angola) Ivete Simão |
Coach:
| | | (Angola) Vivaldo Eduardo |

== Final ranking ==
| Rank | Team | Record |
|---|---|---|
| Gold medal | (Angola) Primeiro de Agosto | 6–0 |
| Silver medal | (Angola) Petro Atlético | 4–1 |
| Bronze medal | (Republic of the Congo) ABO Sport | 3–2 |
| 4 | (Republic of the Congo) DGSP | 4–3 |
| 5 | (Cameroon) FAP Yaoundé | 3–2 |
| 6 | (Democratic Republic of the Congo) HC Héritage | 1–5 |
| 7 | (Cape Verde) Atlético do Mindelo | 0–3 |
| 8 | (Ivory Coast) Bandama | 0–4 |

2019 Africa Women's Handball Champions Cup winner

6th title

Squad:
Amália Pinto, Eneleidys Guevara, Helena Sousa (GK)
Christianne Mwasesa, Helena Paulo, Juliana Machado, Vilma Silva, Vivalda Silva, Wuta Dombaxe (B)
Claudete José, Iracelma Silva, Janete Santos, Mafuta Pedro, Natália Bernardo (W)
Albertina Kassoma, Liliana Venâncio (P)
Morten Soubak (Head Coach)

== See also ==
- 2019 African Women's Handball Cup Winners' Cup
- 2018 African Women's Handball Championship
