= 2019 African Women's Handball Cup Winners' Cup =

Tournament details
- Host country: Morocco
- Venues: 2 (in 1 host city)
- Dates: April 5–14
- Teams: 8 (from 1 confederation)

Final positions
- Champions: 1º de Agosto (4th title)
- Runners-up: Petro Atlético
- Third place: DGSP
- Fourth place: FAP Yaoundé

Tournament statistics
- Matches played: 24
- Goals scored: 1,206 (50.25 per match)

The 2019 African Women's Handball Cup Winners' Cup was the 35th edition of the tournament, organized by the African Handball Confederation, under the auspices of the International Handball Federation, the governing body. The tournament was held from April 5–14, 2019 at the Salles Prince Heritier Moulay El Hassan and 16 Aout in Oujda, Morocco, contested by eight teams, and was won by Primeiro de Agosto of Angola.

== Draw ==
Group A	Group B
(Ivory Coast) Bandama (Cameroon) Dynamique (Democratic Republic of the Congo) HC Héritage (Angola) Primeiro de Agosto	(Republic of the Congo) DGSP (Cameroon) FAP Yaoundé (Angola) Petro Atlético (Senegal) Renaissance

== Preliminary rounds ==
Times given below are in CET (UTC+1).

=== Group A ===
Fri, 5 Apr 2019
13:00	HC Héritage (Democratic Republic of the Congo)	29 (14:14) 27	(Cameroon) Dynamique
17:00	1º de Agosto (Angola)	28 (13:07) 13	(Ivory Coast) Bandama
Sun, 7 Apr 2019
13:00	1º de Agosto (Angola)	28 (15:10) 15	(Cameroon) Dynamique
13:00	HC Héritage (Democratic Republic of the Congo)	24 (12:15) 28	(Ivory Coast) Bandama
Tue, 9 Apr 2019
17:00	Dynamique (Cameroon)	21 (13:10) 22	(Ivory Coast) Bandama
19:00	1º de Agosto (Angola)	37 (17:09) 15	(Democratic Republic of the Congo) HC Héritage

Team	Pld	W	D	L	GF	GA	GDIF	Pts
(Angola) 1º de Agosto	3	3	0	0	93	43	+50	6
(Ivory Coast) Bandama	3	2	0	1	63	73	-10	4
(Democratic Republic of the Congo) HC Héritage	3	1	0	2	68	92	-24	2
(Cameroon) Dynamique	3	0	0	3	63	79	-16	0

* Note: Advance to semi-finals

PRI	BAN	HER	DYN
—	28–13	37–15	28–15
13–28	—	28–24	22–21
15–37	24–28	—	29–27
15–28	21–22	27–29	—

=== Group B ===
Sat, 6 Apr 2019
17:00	Petro Atlético (Angola)	54 (22:07) 10	(Senegal) Renaissance
19:00	FAP Yaoundé (Cameroon)	28 (16:13) 28	(Republic of the Congo) DGSP
Sun, 7 Apr 2019
15:00	Petro Atlético (Angola)	21 (09:11) 21	(Republic of the Congo) DGSP
15:00	FAP Yaoundé (Cameroon)	38 (20:07) 18	(Senegal) Renaissance
Tue, 9 Apr 2019
13:00	DGSP (Republic of the Congo)	41 (20:12) 18	(Senegal) Renaissance
17:00	Petro Atlético (Angola)	27 (09:08) 18	(Cameroon) FAP Yaoundé

Team	Pld	W	D	L	GF	GA	GDIF	Pts
(Angola) Petro Atlético	3	2	1	0	102	49	+53	5
(Republic of the Congo) DGSP	3	1	2	0	90	67	+23	4
(Cameroon) FAP Yaoundé	3	1	1	1	84	73	+11	3
(Senegal) Renaissance	3	0	0	3	46	133	-87	0

* Note: Advance to semi-finals

PET	DGS	FAP	REN
—	21–21	27–18	54–10
21–21	—	28–28	41–18
18–27	28–28	—	38–18
10–54	18–41	18–38	—

== Knockout stage ==
Championship bracket

Quarter-finals
Thu 11 Apr 2019 – 13:00
(Angola) 1º de Agosto	39
(Senegal) Renaissance	7
Thu 11 Apr 2019 – 15:00
(Republic of the Congo) DGSP	26
(Democratic Republic of the Congo) HC Héritage	20
Thu 11 Apr 2019 – 19:00
(Angola) Petro Atlético	31
(Cameroon) Dynamique	20
Fri 12 Apr 2019 – 17:00
(Ivory Coast) Bandama	28
(Cameroon) FAP Yaoundé	32

Semi-finals
Fri 12 Apr 2019 – 13:00
(Angola) 1º de Agosto	31
(Republic of the Congo) DGSP	18
Fri 12 Apr 2019 – 17:30
(Angola) Petro Atlético	26
(Cameroon) FAP Yaoundé	17

Final
Sun 14 Apr 2019 – 16:00
(Angola) 1º de Agosto	28
(Angola) Petro Atlético	16
Third place
Sun 14 Apr 2019 – 12:00
(Republic of the Congo) DGSP	33
(Cameroon) FAP Yaoundé	24

5-8th bracket

5th-8th place
Fri 12 Apr 2019 – 17:00
(Senegal) Renaissance	21
(Democratic Republic of the Congo) HC Héritage	36
Fri 12 Apr 2019 – 19:00
(Ivory Coast) Bandama	23
(Cameroon) Dynamique	22

Fifth place
Sat 13 Apr 2019 – 17:00
(Democratic Republic of the Congo) HC Héritage	30
(Ivory Coast) Bandama	23
Seventh place
Sat 13 Apr 2019 – 13:00
(Cameroon) Dynamique	28
(Senegal) Renaissance	18

== Final standings ==
Rank	Team	Record
Gold medal	(Angola) 1º de Agosto	6–0
Silver medal	(Angola) Petro Atlético	6–1
Bronze medal	(Republic of the Congo) DGSP	4–2
4	(Cameroon) FAP Yaoundé	3–3
5	(Democratic Republic of the Congo) HC Héritage	4–2
6	(Ivory Coast) Bandama	2–5
7	(Cameroon) Dynamique	2–5
8	(Senegal) Renaissance	0–6

2019 African Women's Handball Cup Winners' Cup winner

4th title

Squad:
Amália Pinto, Eneleidys Guevara, Helena Sousa (GK)
Christianne Mwasesa, Helena Paulo, Juliana Machado, Natália Bernardo, Vilma Silva, Vivalda Silva, Wuta Dombaxe (B)
Claudete José, Iracelma Silva, Janete Santos, Mafuta Pedro (W)
Albertina Kassoma, Liliana Venâncio (P)
Morten Soubak (Head Coach)

== See also ==
2019 African Women's Handball Champions League
