= 2019 African Handball Super Cup =

African handball tournament

Tournament details
- Host country: Morocco
- Venue(s): 1 (in 1 host city)
- Dates: 4 April 2019
- Teams: 4 (from 2 confederations)

Final positions
- Champions: (Egypt) Zamalek (5th title) (Angola) 1º de Agosto (4th title)
- Runner-up: (Egypt) Al Ahly SC (Angola) Petro de Luanda

Tournament statistics
- Matches played: 2
- Goals scored: 105 (52.5 per match)

The 2019 African Handball Super Cup (25th edition), also known as Babacar Fall Super Cup, in honour of the first chairman of the African Handball Confederation, was a handball competition organized by the African Handball Confederation, under the auspices of the International Handball Federation, the handball sport governing body. The matches, held on 4 April 2019 at the Salle Omnisport Al Inbiâat, in Oudja, Morocco, were contested by Zamalek, the 2018 African Handball Champions League winner and Al Ahly, the 2018 African Handball Cup Winners' Cup winner, on the man's side and Clube Desportivo Primeiro de Agosto, the 2018 African Women's Handball Champions League winner and Petro de Luanda, the 2018 African Women's Handball Cup Winners' Cup winner. Zamalek, on the man's side and Primeiro de Agosto, on the woman's side, were the winners.

The winners qualified to the 2019 IHF Super Globe.

== 2019 Africa Men's Handball Super Cup ==
Thu, 4 Apr 2019
19:00 CET (UTC+1)
Zamalek (Egypt)
38–35 (ET)
(Egypt) Al Ahly
Moulay Hassan, Oudja
Referees: Diop, Faye (SEN)
Boughanmi 11
(11–13)
Semikov 9
2× (yellow card) 14× (suspension) 1× (red card)
Match report
1× (yellow card) 11× (suspension)

FT: 27–27 ET: 4–4, 7–4

== 2019 Africa Women's Handball Super Cup ==
Thu, 4 Apr 2019; 17:00 CET (UTC+1)	1º de Agosto (Angola)	19–13	(Angola) Petro de Luanda	Moulay Hassan, Oudja; Referees: Belkhiri, Hamidi (ALG)
Thu, 4 Apr 2019; 17:00 CET (UTC+1)	Paulo, Mwasesa 6	(8–4)	three players 3	Moulay Hassan, Oudja; Referees: Belkhiri, Hamidi (ALG)
Thu, 4 Apr 2019; 17:00 CET (UTC+1)	1× (yellow card) 7× (suspension)	Match report	2× (yellow card) 6× (suspension)	Moulay Hassan, Oudja; Referees: Belkhiri, Hamidi (ALG)

== Awards ==
2019 Africa Men's Handball Super Cup Winners	2019 Africa Women's Handball Super Cup Winners
Al Zamalek Handball Club; 6th title	Clube Desportivo Primeiro de Agosto; 5th title

== See also ==
- 2019 African Handball Champions League
- 2019 African Women's Handball Champions League
- 2019 African Handball Cup Winners' Cup
- 2019 African Women's Handball Cup Winners' Cup
