= Women's clubs with the most international titles in handball =

The Most International titles in women's handball is a list of women's handball teams around the world with most international titles representing all the International Handball Federation Affiliated Confederations such as the Asian Handball Federation (AHF), African Handball Confederation (CAHB), European Handball Federation (EHF), North America and the Caribbean Handball Confederation (NACHC), Oceania Continent Handball Federation (OCHF), and the South and Central America Handball Confederation (SCAHC).

Regional Titles are not accounted in this list because it does not affiliated with the International Handball Federation Competitions.

== Top 10 ==
Pos.	Team	Titles	Continental	Trophies
1	(Angola) Petro Atlético Handball	44	CAHB	(19) African Champions League + (17) CHAB Babacar Fall Super Cup + (8) CHAB Cup Winner's Cup
2	(Angola) Primeiro de Agosto Handball	15	CAHB	(1) IHF Super Globe + (5) African Champions League + (4) CHAB Cup Winner's Cup + (5) CHAB Babacar Fall Super Cup
3	(Soviet Union) HC Spartak Kyiv	13	EHF	(13) EHF Champions League
=	(Ivory Coast) Africa Sports National	13	CAHB	(3) African Champions League + (9) CHAB Cup Winner's Cup + (1) CHAB Babacar Fall Super Cup
5	(Austria) Hypo Niederösterreich	10	EHF	(8) EHF Champions League + (1) EHF Champions Trophy + (1) EHF Cup Winners' Cup
6	(Denmark) Viborg HK	9	EHF	(3) Champions League + (3) EHF Cup + (2) EHF Champions Trophy + (1) Cup Winners' Cup
7	(Montenegro) ŽRK Budućnost	6	EHF	(2) Champions League + (3) Women's EHF Cup Winners' Cup + (1) Women's EHF Cup
=	(Denmark) FC Midtjylland Håndbold	6	EHF	(2) EHF Cup + (2) EHF Cup Winners' Cup + (1) EHF Challenge Cup + (1) EHF Champions Trophy
=	(Socialist Federal Republic of Yugoslavia) ŽRK Radnički	6	EHF	(3) EHF Champions League + (3) EHF Cup Winners' Cup
10	(Hungary) Győri Audi ETO KC	5	EHF	(5) Champions League

== Countries with most teams in top 10 ==
Pos.	Country	Teams #	Top 3	Top 5	Top 10
1	Angola	2	2	2	2
2	Denmark	2	0	0	2
3	Soviet Union	1	1	1	1
4	Ivory Coast	1	1	1	1
5	Austria	1	0	1	1
6	Montenegro	1	0	0	1
7	Yugoslavia	1	0	0	1
8	Hungary	1	0	0	1

== Countries with most titles in top 10 ==
Pos.	Country	Titles #
1	Angola	58
2	Denmark	15
3	Soviet Union	13
=	Ivory Coast	13
5	Austria	10
6	Montenegro	6
=	Yugoslavia	6
8	Hungary	5
