= Omar Azzeb =

Algerian handball player (born 1960)

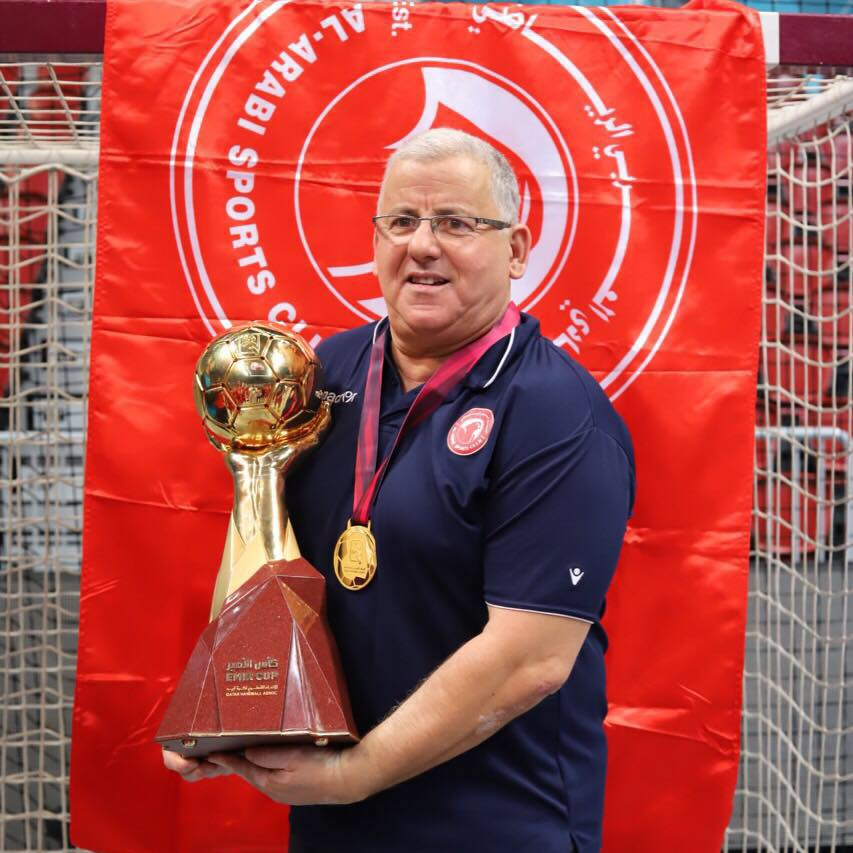
- Azeb at the Emir of Qatar Cup in 2019

Personal information
- Nationality: Algerian
- Born: 7 July 1960 (age 66)
- Height: 182 cm (72 in)

Sport
- Sport: Handball
- Position: Pivot / Centerback

Youth career
- Years: Team
- 1975-1976: AS Finances
- 1976-1978: JRM-BNA

Senior clubs
- Years: Team
- 1978-1995: MC Alger
National team
- Years: Team
- 1978-1993: Algeria

Teams managed
- 1997-2000: MC Alger
- 2000-2001: ES Tunis
- 2002-2004: Al Nasr Handball club
- 2004-2006: Al-Arabi SC
- 2006-2008: Al Nasr Handball club
- 2008-2010: Al-Salmiya SC
- 2011-2014: Al Wasl F.C.
- 2014-2018: Al-Arabi SC

Omar Azzeb (born 7 July 1960) is an Algerian handball player and coach. He competed at the 1980 Summer Olympics, the 1984 Summer Olympics and the 1988 Summer Olympics.

He played for MC Alger his entire career, where he won the Algerian Handball Championship 9 times.
