= JS Saoura Handball =

Algerian handball team

JS Saoura
- Full name: Jeunesse Sportive de la Saoura
- Short name: JSS
- Founded: 2014
- President: Mohamed Zerouati
- League: Algerian Handball Championship

Jeunesse Sportive de la Saoura (Arabic: الشبيبة الرياضية للساورة), referred to as JS Saoura or JSS for short, is an Algerian handball team, as a division of JS Saoura.

== History ==
On March 29, 2018, JS Saoura managed to achieve a historic rise to Division Excellence two rounds before the end of the season, which was not more than four years old. Needing only one point to reach, JS Saoura players scored their goal in the match, against RC Larbaâ's team (22–22) for (Western Group), and Mohamed Zerouati announced that he will invest next season in training young handball players. In the 2020–21 season, which is a complement to the previous season, which was stopped due to COVID-19 pandemic in Algeria, JS Saoura achieved the runner-up for the first time and in favor of JSE Skikda. On October 16, 2021, JS Saoura won a historic title by winning the Super Cup for the first time after defeating the league title holder JSE Skikda with a score of 23–22. This Supercup final was marked by the return of the public to the stands a first since the spread of the COVID-19 pandemic in Algeria in March 2019.

== Honours ==
=== National titles ===
- Algerian Handball Supercup
  - Winners (1): 2020

== Statistics ==
=== Recent seasons ===
Season	League									Play-Off/Down								Cup
Season	Division	Pos	Pts	P	W	D	L	GF	GA	Pos	Pts	P	W	D	L	GF	GA	Cup
2018–19	Division Excellence	4th	14	14	6	2	6	297	308	5th	8	8	4	0	4	170	156	Round of 32
2019–20	Division Excellence	Canceled (Note: On March 15, 2020, the Ministry of Youth and Sports decided to stop the season due to the COVID-19 pandemic in Algeria.)																Round of 32 (Note: After more than two years of hiatus due to the COVID-19 pandemic in Algeria, completing the cup competition from the Round of 16.)
2020–21	Division Excellence	Canceled																Canceled
2021–22	Division Excellence	Canceled																Canceled
2022–23	Division Excellence	3rd	22	16	11	0	5	476	434		0	0	0	0	0	0	0	Semi-finals
