= Abdeldjalil Bouanani =

Algerian handball player (born 1966)

Personal information
- Nationality: Algerian
- Born: 27 July 1966 (age 60) Oran, Algeria
- Height: 1.88 m (6 ft 2 in)

Sport
- Sport: Handball

Senior clubs
- Years: Team
- –: MC Oran
- –: MC Alger
- –: ES Tunis
- –: MC Oran
- –: OC Alger
- –: MC Alger
- –: US Biskra
- –: Limoges
National team
- Years: Team
- –: Algeria

Teams managed
- 2004–2006: Limoges
- 2008–2009: Al-Shabab Dubai
- 2011–2012: Khaleej
- 2012: Sadaka SC
- 2016: Bahrain
- 2017–2019: Al-Ittifaq Manama
- 2019–: CHT Oran
Medal record
Men's handball
Representing Algeria
African Championship
Silver medal – second place	1994 Tunisia	Team

Abdeldjalil Bouanani (born 27 July 1966) is an Algerian handball player. He competed in the men's tournament at the 1996 Summer Olympics.
