= African Women's Handball Cup Winners' Cup =

- Founded: 1985
- Country: Africa
- Confederation: CAHB members
- Most recent champions: (Angola) Primeiro de Agosto (5th title)
- Most titles: (Angola) Petro Atlético (10 titles)
- 2026 African Women's Handball Cup Winner's Cup

The Africa Women's Handball Championship for Clubs Winner's Cup is an annual international women's handball club competition run by the African Handball Confederation. The club sides from Africa's handball women's cup's winners in each African country are invited to participate in this competition.

== Summary ==
#	Year	Host	Final			Third place match		
#	Year	Host	Champion	Score	Second place	Third place	Score	Fourth place
1	1985; Details	(Egypt); Port Said	Grasshoppers of Owerri (Nigeria)	–	(Egypt) SC Heliopolis	(Egypt) Olympic SC Alexandria		
2	1986; Details	(Benin); Cotonou	AS Cami Toyota (Cameroon)	–	(Nigeria) Grasshoppers of Owerri	(Zaire) Njanja Lubumbashi		
3	1987; Details	(Egypt); Cairo	Camship de Douala (Cameroon)	–	(Republic of the Congo) US AGIP Pointe-Noire	SC Heliopolis (Egypt)	–	(Egypt) Al Ahly SC
4	1988; Details	(Algeria); Oran	Camship de Douala (Cameroon)	^{n/a}	(Cameroon) AS CNPS Yaoundé	Club Africain (Tunisia)	^{n/a}	(Algeria) MP Oran
5	1989; Details	(Egypt); Cairo	Camship de Douala (Cameroon)	18–13	(Republic of the Congo) CARA Brazzaville	AS CNPS Yaoundé (Cameroon)	–	(Ivory Coast) ASEC Mimosas
6	1990; Details	(Morocco); Rabat	Camship de Douala (Cameroon)	–	(Cameroon) CNPS Yaoundé	CARA Brazzaville (Republic of the Congo)	–	(Tunisia) Zaoui Meubles Sports
7	1991; Details	(Algeria); Algiers	Desert Queens (Nigeria)	25–23 (a.e.t.)	(Algeria) NA Hussein Dey	Africa Sports National (Ivory Coast)	–	(Ivory Coast) UCO Sport
8	1992; Details	(Nigeria); Bauchi	Africa Sports National (Ivory Coast)	–	(Nigeria) Desert Queens	UCO Sport (Republic of the Congo)	–	(Nigeria) Top Lines Sparrow
9	1993; Details	(Egypt); Cairo	Africa Sports National (Ivory Coast)	17–15	(Republic of the Congo) UCO Sport	Al Ahly SC (Egypt)	–	(Réunion) AS St Gilles
10	1994; Details	(Morocco); Rabat	Africa Sports National (Ivory Coast)	^{n/a}	(Algeria) IRB Alger	AS Sogara (Gabon)	^{n/a}	(Morocco) COS MUVE
11	1995; Details	(Niger); Niamey	Africa Sports National (Ivory Coast)	^{n/a}	(Republic of the Congo) Inter Club Brazzaville	MC Alger (Algeria)	^{n/a}	(Angola) Sporting Cabinda
12	1996; Details	(Morocco); Meknes	Africa Sports National (Ivory Coast)	^{n/a}	(Republic of the Congo) Banco Sport	Electro do Lobito (Angola)	^{n/a}	(Democratic Republic of the Congo) HC Nuru
13	1997; Details	(Nigeria); Kano	Africa Sports National (Ivory Coast)	–	(Nigeria) Grasshoppers of Owerri	(Nigeria) Valiants Abia		
14	1998; Details	(Nigeria); Bauchi	Africa Sports National (Ivory Coast)	–	(Republic of the Congo) Étoile du Congo	AS CNPS Yaoundé (Cameroon)	–	(Nigeria) Desert Queens
15	1999; Details	(Algeria); Algiers	MC Alger (Algeria)	–	(Algeria) OC Alger	RIJ Alger (Algeria)	–	(Republic of the Congo) Inter Club Brazzaville
16	2000; Details	(Nigeria); Bauchi	Africa Sports National (Ivory Coast)	–	(Cameroon) AS CNPS Yaoundé	(Nigeria) Yankari Babes		
17	2001; Details	(Morocco); Meknes	Africa Sports National (Ivory Coast)	24–22	(Algeria) MC Alger	RAC Abidjan (Ivory Coast)	–	(Cameroon) AS CNPS Yaoundé
18	2002; Details	(Ivory Coast); Yamoussoukro	Rombo Sport Kpouebo (Ivory Coast)	–	(Republic of the Congo) Inter Club Brazzaville	RAC Abidjan (Ivory Coast)	–	(Cameroon) AS CNPS Yaoundé
19	2003; Details	(Tunisia); Tunis	MC Alger (Algeria)	29–28 (a.e.t.)x2	(Ivory Coast) RAC Abidjan	Tonnerre CK Yaoundé (Cameroon)	–	(Republic of the Congo) Inter Club Brazzaville
20	2004; Details	(Tunisia); Tunis	Rombo Sport Kpouebo (Ivory Coast)	28–21	(Tunisia) ASFS Tunis	Tonnerre CK Yaoundé (Cameroon)	–	(Democratic Republic of the Congo) HC Heritage
21	2005; Details	(Morocco); Fes	Rombo Sport Kpouebo (Ivory Coast)	–	(Republic of the Congo) Inter Club Brazzaville	CARA Brazzaville (Republic of the Congo)	–	(Democratic Republic of the Congo) TP Mazembe
22	2006; Details	(Ivory Coast); Abidjan	Rombo Sport Kpouebo (Ivory Coast)	–	(Republic of the Congo) Inter Club Brazzaville	Africa Sports National (Ivory Coast)	–	(Republic of the Congo) CARA Brazzaville
23	2007; Details	(Tunisia); Mahdia	Inter Club Brazzaville (Republic of the Congo)	–	(Republic of the Congo) ABO Sport	Rombo Sport Kpouebo (Ivory Coast)	–	(Angola) ASA
24	2008; Details	(Morocco); Meknes	Petro de Luanda (Angola)	–	(Cameroon) Tonnerre CK Yaoundé	MC Alger (Algeria)	–	(Ivory Coast) Rombo Sport Kpouebo
25	2009; Details	(Benin); Cotonou	Petro de Luanda (Angola)	36–23	(Algeria) GS Pétroliers	Tonnerre CK Yaoundé (Cameroon)	–	(Ivory Coast) Rombo Sport Kpouebo
26	2010; Details	(Burkina Faso); Ouagadougou	Petro de Luanda (Angola)	32–21	(Cameroon) FAP Yaoundé	GS Pétroliers (Algeria)	–	(Republic of the Congo) ABO Sport
27	2011; Details	(Cameroon); Yaoundé	Petro de Luanda (Angola)	32–20	(Cameroon) FAP Yaoundé	Tonnerre CK Yaoundé (Cameroon)	^{n/a}	(Republic of the Congo) ASEL Brazzaville
28	2012; Details	(Tunisia); Tunis	Petro de Luanda (Angola)	^{n/a}	(Ivory Coast) Africa Sports National	HC Héritage (Democratic Republic of the Congo)	^{n/a}	(Tunisia) ES Rejiche
29	2013; Details	(Tunisia); Hammamet	Petro de Luanda (Angola)	37–32	(Republic of the Congo) Inter Club Brazzaville	HC Héritage (Democratic Republic of the Congo)	26–24	(Cameroon) FAP Yaoundé
30	2014; Details	(Republic of the Congo); Oyo	Petro de Luanda (Angola)	30–21	(Cameroon) FAP Yaoundé	Progresso (Angola)	22–21	(Republic of the Congo) ABO Sport
31	2015; Details	(Gabon); Libreville	Primeiro de Agosto (Angola)	36–22	(Ivory Coast) Africa Sports National	ABO Sport (Republic of the Congo)	36–29	(Cameroon) FAP Yaoundé
32	2016; Details	(Morocco); Laayoune	Primeiro de Agosto (Angola)	40–16	(Cameroon) TKC	Progresso (Angola)	33–30	(Cameroon) FAP Yaoundé
33	2017; Details	(Morocco); Agadir	Primeiro de Agosto (Angola)	24–16	(Cameroon) FAP Yaoundé	CARA Brazzaville (Republic of the Congo)	27–16	(Democratic Republic of the Congo) HC Vainqueur
34	2018; Details	(Egypt); Cairo	Petro de Luanda (Angola)	23–19	(Angola) Primeiro de Agosto	FAP Yaoundé (Cameroon)	28–21	(Republic of the Congo) ABO Sport
35	2019; Details	(Morocco); Oujda	Primeiro de Agosto (Angola)	28–16	(Angola) Petro de Luanda	DGSP Brazzaville (Republic of the Congo)	33–24	(Cameroon) FAP Yaoundé
-	2020		Canceled due to the COVID-19 pandemic					
-	2021		Canceled					
36	2022; Details	(Niger); Niamey	Petro de Luanda (Angola)	^{n/a}	(Republic of the Congo) DGSP Brazzaville	FAP Yaoundé (Cameroon)	^{n/a}	(Ivory Coast) Bandama HBC
37	2023; Details	(Egypt); Cairo	Petro de Luanda (Angola)	20–17	(Angola) Primeiro de Agosto	Al Ahly (Egypt)	28–16	(Republic of the Congo) AS Otohô
38	2024; Details	(Algeria); Oran	Primeiro de Agosto (Angola)	23–22 (a.e.t.)	(Angola) Petro de Luanda	Al Ahly (Egypt)	23–20	(Republic of the Congo) AS Otohô
39	2025; Details	(Egypt); Cairo		–			–	
40	2026; Details	(Democratic Republic of the Congo); Kinshasa		–			–	

^n/a Round-robin tournament.

== Winners by club ==
As of April 2024

#	Nat	Clubs	Winners	Runners-up	Thirds	Total
1	(Angola)	Petro Atlético	10	2	0	12
2	(Ivory Coast)	Africa Sports National	9	2	2	13
3	(Angola)	Primeiro de Agosto	5	2	0	7
4	(Ivory Coast)	Rombo Sport Kpouebo	4	0	1	5
5	(Cameroon)	Camship de Douala	4	0	0	4
6	(Algeria)	MC Alger	2	2	3	7
7	(Republic of the Congo)	Inter Club Brazzaville	1	5	0	6
8	(Nigeria)	Grasshoppers of Owerri	1	2	0	3
9	(Nigeria)	Desert Queens	1	1	0	2
10	(Cameroon)	FAP Yaoundé	0	4	2	6
11	(Cameroon)	CNPS Yaoundé	0	3	2	5
12	(Cameroon)	TKC Yaoundé	0	2	4	6
13	(Algeria)	OC Alger	0	2	0	2
14	(Republic of the Congo)	CARA Brazzaville	0	1	3	4
15	(Ivory Coast)	RAC Abidjan	0	1	2	3
16	(Republic of the Congo)	ABO Sport	0	1	1	2
16	(Republic of the Congo)	UCO Sport	0	1	1	2
16	(Egypt)	SC Heliopolis	0	1	1	2
19	(Republic of the Congo)	DGSP Brazzaville	0	1	1	2
20	(Tunisia)	ASFS Tunis	0	1	0	1
20	(Republic of the Congo)	Étoile du Congo	0	1	0	1
20	(Republic of the Congo)	Banco Sport	0	1	0	1
20	(Algeria)	NA Hussein Dey	0	1	0	1
20	(Republic of the Congo)	US AGIP Pointe-Noire	0	1	0	1
25	(Egypt)	Al Ahly SC	0	0	3	3
26	(Angola)	Progresso	0	0	2	2
26	(Democratic Republic of the Congo)	HC Héritage	0	0	2	2
28	(Nigeria)	Yankari Babes	0	0	1	1
28	(Algeria)	RIJ Alger	0	0	1	1
28	(Nigeria)	Valiants Abia	0	0	1	1
28	(Angola)	Electro do Lobito	0	0	1	1
28	(Gabon)	AS Sogara	0	0	1	1
28	(Tunisia)	Club Africain	0	0	1	1
28	(Egypt)	Olympic Alexandria	0	0	1	1

- Rq:

MC Alger (ex. GS Pétroliers)
MC Oran (ex. MP Oran)
OC Alger (ex. IRB Alger)

== Winners by country ==
As of April 2024

#	Nation	Winners	Runners-up	Thirds	Total
1	Angola	15	4	3	22
2	Ivory Coast	13	3	5	21
3	Cameroon	4	9	8	21
4	Algeria	2	5	4	11
5	Nigeria	2	3	2	7
6	(Republic of the Congo) Congo	1	12	5	18
7	Egypt	0	1	5	6
8	Tunisia	0	1	1	2
9	(Democratic Republic of the Congo) DR Congo	0	0	2	2
10	Gabon	0	0	1	1

== Medals (1985-2024) ==
Rank	Nation	Gold	Silver	Bronze	Total
1	Angola	15	4	3	22
2	Ivory Coast	13	3	5	21
3	Cameroon	5	9	8	22
4	Algeria	2	5	4	11
5	Nigeria	2	3	2	7
6	Congo	1	12	6	19
7	Egypt	0	1	5	6
8	Tunisia	0	1	1	2
9	DR Congo	0	0	3	3
10	Gabon	0	0	1	1
Totals (10 entries)		38	38	38	114

== Participation details ==
Nat
Nat	Club		(Nigeria)	(Morocco)	(Ivory Coast)	(Tunisia)	(Tunisia)	(Morocco)	(Ivory Coast)	(Tunisia)	(Morocco)	(Benin)	(Uganda)	(Cameroon)	(Tunisia)	(Tunisia)	(Republic of the Congo)	(Gabon)	(Morocco)	(Morocco)	(Egypt)	(Morocco)	
Nat	Club	1985–1999	2000	2001	2002	2003	2004	2005	2006	2007	2008	2009	2010	2011	2012	2013	2014	2015	2016	2017	2018	2019	
Nat	Club		X	X	X	X	X	X	X	X	x	x	8	6	6	9	8	10	8	7	9	8	
(Republic of the Congo)	ABO Sport									2007		4					4	03 2015			4		5
(Ivory Coast)	Africa Sports National	1991 1992 1993 1994 1995 1996 1997 1998	1 2000	1 2001					3 2006						2 2012	5		02 2015	6				15
(Egypt)	Al Ahly	1993																			7		2
(Tunisia)	Amal Tazarka															8							1
(Cameroon)	AS Cami Toyota	1986																					1
(Gabon)	AS Sogara	1994																					1
(Angola)	ASA									4													1
(Morocco)	ASCUM																		7				1
(Tunisia)	ASE Ariana															6							1
(Republic of the Congo)	ASEL													4			6		5				3
(Burkina Faso)	ASFAY												7										1
(Tunisia)	ASFS Tunis						2 2004																1
(Republic of the Congo)	Banco Sport	1996																					1
(Ivory Coast)	Bandama																					6	1
(Nigeria)	Borno State														P								1
(Cameroon)	Camship	1987 1988 1989 1990																					4
(Republic of the Congo)	CARA Brazzaville	1989 1990						3 2005	4											3 2017	9		6
(Tunisia)	Club Africain	1988																					1
(Cameroon)	CNPS Yaoundé	1988 1989 1990 1998	2 2000	4	4																		7
(Nigeria)	Desert Queens	1991 1992																					2
(Republic of the Congo)	DGSP																					3 2019	1
(Cameroon)	Dynamique																				6	7	2
(Angola)	Electro do Lobito	1996																					1
(Tunisia)	ES Rejiche														4								1
(Republic of the Congo)	Étoile du Congo	1998																6					2
(Cameroon)	FAP Yaoundé											4	2 2010	2 2011		4	2 2014	4	4	2 2017	3 2018	4	10
(Nigeria)	Grasshoppers	1985 1986 1997																					3
(Algeria)	MC Alger	1995 1999		2 2001		1 2003					3 2008	2 2009	3 2010										6
(Ivory Coast)	Habitat																				8		1
(Algeria)	HBC Gdyel															9							1
(Democratic Republic of the Congo)	HC Héritage						4						6	6	3 2012	3 2013		8			5	5	8
(Democratic Republic of the Congo)	HC Vainqueur																			4			1
(Egypt)	Heliopolis	1985 1987																					2
(Republic of the Congo)	Inter Club	1995			2 2002	4		2 2005	2 2006	1 2007						2 2013	5						8
(Nigeria)	Kada Queens																			5			1
(Burkina Faso)	LONAB												8										1
(Democratic Republic of the Congo)	Mikishi																		8				1
(Algeria)	NA Hussein Dey	1991																					1
(Democratic Republic of the Congo)	Njanja Lubumbashi	1986																					1
(Algeria)	OC Alger	1994 1999																					2
(Egypt)	Olympic Alexandria	1985																					1
(Angola)	Petro de Luanda										1 2008	1 2009	1 2010	1 2011	1 2012	1 2013	1 2014				1 2018	2 2019	9
(Gabon)	Phoenix Gabon															7	8	7					3
(Angola)	Primeiro de Agosto																	01 2015	1 2016	1 2017	2 2018	1 2019	5
(Angola)	Progresso																3 2014	5	3 2016				3
(Ivory Coast)	RAC Abidjan			3 2001	3 2002	2 2003																	3
(Senegal)	Renaissance																					8	1
(Algeria)	RIJ Alger	1999																					1
(Ivory Coast)	Rombo Sport				1 2002		1 2004	1 2005	1 2006	3 2007	4	4	5										8
(Senegal)	Saltigue HC																	10					1
(Madagascar)	Tana HBC																			7			1
(Cameroon)	TKC					3 2003	3 2004				2 2008	2 2009		3 2011			7	9	2 2016				8
(Democratic Republic of the Congo)	TP Mazembe							4															1
(Republic of the Congo)	UCO Sport	1992 1993																					2
(Republic of the Congo)	US AGIP	1987																					1
(Morocco)	US Nouasseur																			6			1
(Nigeria)	Valiants Abia	1997																					1
(Nigeria)	Yankari Bullets		3 2000																				1
(Algeria)	MC Oran	4 (1988)																					1
# Teams			2000 X	2001 X	2002 X	2003 X	2004 X	2005 X	2006 X	2007 X	2008 X	2009 X	2010 8	2011 6	2012 6	2013 9	2014 8	2015 10	2016 8	2017 7	2018 9	2019 8	

== See also ==
- African Women's Handball Champions League
- African Women's Handball Super Cup
- African Women's Handball Championship
