= Belhocine =

Belhocine may refer to:

- Djaffar Belhocine (born 1961), Algerian handball player
- Karim Belhocine (born 1978), French footballer
- Mohamed Belhocine (born 1951), Algerian academician and epidemiologist
- Sarra Belhocine (born 1994), Algerian volleyball player
