= 2014 African Women's Handball Cup Winners' Cup =

Tournament details
- Host country: Congo
- Venue(s): 1 (in 1 host city)
- Dates: May 20–29
- Teams: 8 (from 1 confederation)

Final positions
- Champions: (Angola) Petro Atlético (7th title)
- Runners-up: (Cameroon) FAP Yaoundé
- Third place: (Angola) Progresso
- Fourth place: (Republic of the Congo) ABO Sport

Tournament statistics
- Matches played: 24
- Goals scored: 1,194 (49.75 per match)

The 2014 African Women's Handball Cup Winners' Cup was the 30th edition, organized by the African Handball Confederation, under the auspices of the International Handball Federation, the handball sport governing body. The tournament was held from May 19–30, 2014 in Oyo, Republic of the Congo, contested by 8 teams and won by Atlético Petróleos de Luanda of Angola.

== Draw ==
Group A	Group B
(Republic of the Congo) ASEL (Cameroon) FAP Yaoundé (Republic of the Congo) Inter Club (Angola) Progresso	(Republic of the Congo) ABO Sport; Phoenix Gabon (Angola) Petro Atlético (Cameroon) TKC

== Preliminary rounds ==
Times given below are in WAT UTC+1.

=== Group A ===
Wed, 21 May 2014
Inter Club (Republic of the Congo)	22 (09:11) 24	(Angola) Progresso
FAP Yaoundé (Cameroon)	26 (14:11) 21	(Republic of the Congo) ASEL
Thu, 22 May 2014
Inter Club (Republic of the Congo)	28 (11:11) 26	(Republic of the Congo) ASEL
FAP Yaoundé (Cameroon)	25 (11:07) 22	(Angola) Progresso
Fri, 23 May 2014
Progresso (Angola)	30 (15:09) 25	(Republic of the Congo) ASEL
Inter Club (Republic of the Congo)	29 (16:10) 28	(Cameroon) FAP Yaoundé

Team	Pld	W	D	L	GF	GA	GDIF	Pts
(Cameroon) FAP Yaoundé	3	2	0	1	79	72	+5	4
(Angola) Progresso	3	2	0	1	76	72	+4	4
(Republic of the Congo) Inter Club	3	2	0	1	79	78	+1	4
(Republic of the Congo) ASEL	3	0	0	3	72	84	-12	0

* Note: Advance to quarter-finals

=== Group B ===
Tue/Wed, 20/21 May 2014
Phoenix Gabon	10 (04:13) 29	(Republic of the Congo) Abo Sport
Petro Atlético (Angola)	35 (19:08) 20	(Cameroon) TKC
Thu, 22 May 2014
Petro Atlético (Angola)	35 (20:05) 11	Phoenix Gabon
Abo Sport (Republic of the Congo)	29 (14:08) 21	(Cameroon) TKC
Sat, 24 May 2014
Phoenix Gabon	16 (07:09) 28	(Cameroon) TKC
Petro Atlético (Angola)	31 (15:11) 27	(Republic of the Congo) Abo Sport

Team	Pld	W	D	L	GF	GA	GDIF	Pts
(Angola) Petro Atlético	3	3	0	0	101	58	+43	6
(Republic of the Congo) Abo Sport	3	2	0	1	85	62	+23	4
(Cameroon) TKC	3	1	0	2	69	80	-11	2
Phoenix Gabon	3	0	0	3	37	92	-55	0

* Note: Advance to quarter-finals

== Knockout stage ==
Championship bracket

Quarter-finals
Mon 26 May – 09:00
(Cameroon) TKC	26
(Angola) Progresso	33
Mon 26 May 2014 – 13:00
(Cameroon) FAP Yaoundé	30
(Gabon) Phoenix	15
Mon 26 May 2014 – 17:00
(Angola) Petro Atlético	34
(Republic of the Congo) Asel	27
Mon 26 May 2014 – 21:00
(Republic of the Congo) Inter Club	19
(Republic of the Congo) Abo Sport	21

Semi-finals
Tue 27 May 2014 – 19:00
(Cameroon) FAP Yaoundé	23
(Republic of the Congo) Abo Sport	22
Tue 27 May 2014 – 21:00
(Angola) Progresso	20
(Angola) Petro Atlético	29

Final
Thu 29 May 2014 – 17:00
(Cameroon) FAP Yaoundé	21
(Angola) Petro Atlético	30
Third place
Wed 28 May 2014 – 17:00
(Republic of the Congo) Abo Sport	21
(Angola) Progresso	22

5-8th bracket

5th-8th place
Tue 27 May 2014 – 09:00
Phoenix Gabon	19
(Republic of the Congo) Inter Club	31
Tue 27 May 2014 – 11:00
(Cameroon) TKC	28
(Republic of the Congo) ASEL	29

Fifth place
Wed 28 May 2014 – 15:00
(Republic of the Congo) Inter Club	31
(Republic of the Congo) ASEL	26
Seventh place
Wed 28 May 2014 – 11:00
Phoenix Gabon	18
(Cameroon) TKC	21

== Final standings ==
Rank	Team	Record
Gold medal	(Angola) Petro Atlético	6–0
Silver medal	(Cameroon) FAP Yaoundé	4–2
Bronze medal	(Angola) Progresso	4–2
4	(Republic of the Congo) Abo Sport	3–3
5	(Republic of the Congo) Inter Club	4–2
6	(Republic of the Congo) ASEL	1–5
7	(Cameroon) TKC	2–4
8	Phoenix Gabon	0–6

2014 African Women's Handball Cup Winners' Cup Winner

Atlético Petróleos de Luanda
7th title

== See also ==
2014 African Women's Handball Champions League
