= 2016 African Women's Handball Cup Winners' Cup =

Tournament details
- Host country: Morocco
- Venue(s): 1 (in 1 host city)
- Dates: May 5–20
- Teams: 8 (from 1 confederation)

Final positions
- Champions: (Angola) 1º de Agosto (2nd title)
- Runner-up: (Cameroon) TKC
- Third place: (Angola) Progresso
- Fourth place: (Cameroon) FAP Yaoundé

The 2016 African Women's Handball Cup Winners' Cup was the 32nd edition, organized by the African Handball Confederation, under the auspices of the International Handball Federation, the handball sport governing body. The tournament was held from May 5–20, 2016 in one venue: the Salle Al Jadida, in Laayoune, Morocco, contested by 8 teams and won by Clube Desportivo Primeiro de Agosto of Angola thus successfully defending its tile.

== Draw ==
Group A	Group B
(Morocco) ASCUM (Republic of the Congo) ASEL (Cameroon) FAP Yaoundé (Angola) Primeiro de Agosto	(Ivory Coast) Africa Sports (Democratic Republic of the Congo) Mikishi (Angola) Progresso (Cameroon) TKC

== Preliminary rounds ==
Times given below are in WET UTC+0.

=== Group A ===
Thu, 05 May 2016
10:00	FAP Yaoundé (Cameroon)	35 (12:12) 26	(Republic of the Congo) ASEL
12:00	1º de Agosto (Angola)	41 (20:05) 10	(Morocco) ASCUM
Fri, 06 May 2016
15:00	ASEL (Republic of the Congo)	17 (08:10) 24	(Angola) 1º de Agosto
15:00	ASCUM (Morocco)	11 (06:13) 32	(Cameroon) FAP Yaoundé
Sat, 07 May 2016
15:00	ASEL (Republic of the Congo)	37 (25:06) 16	(Morocco) ASCUM
15:00	1º de Agosto (Angola)	30 (17:12) 21	(Cameroon) FAP Yaoundé

Team	Pld	W	D	L	GF	GA	GDIF	Pts
(Angola) 1º de Agosto	3	3	0	0	95	48	+47	6
(Cameroon) FAP Yaoundé	3	2	0	1	88	67	+21	4
(Republic of the Congo) ASEL	3	1	0	2	80	75	+5	2
(Morocco) ASCUM	3	0	0	3	37	110	-73	0

* Note: Advance to quarter-finals

=== Group B ===
Thu/Fri, 05/06 May 2016
12:00	Africa Sports (Ivory Coast)	34 (16:12) 24	(Democratic Republic of the Congo) Mikishi
17:00	Progresso (Angola)	16 (08:10) 23	(Cameroon) TKC
Sat, 07 May 2016
15:00	Africa Sports (Ivory Coast)	15 (07:11) 17	(Cameroon) TKC
19:00	Mikishi (Democratic Republic of the Congo)	18 (07:16) 32	(Angola) Progresso
Mon, 09 May 2016
15:00	TKC (Cameroon)	24 (14:12) 23	(Democratic Republic of the Congo) Mikishi
17:00	Africa Sports (Ivory Coast)	18 (06:20) 36	(Angola) Progresso

Team	Pld	W	D	L	GF	GA	GDIF	Pts
(Cameroon) TKC	3	3	0	0	64	54	+10	6
(Angola) Progresso	3	2	0	1	84	59	+25	4
(Ivory Coast) Africa Sports	3	2	0	1	67	77	-10	2
(Democratic Republic of the Congo) Mikishi	3	0	0	3	65	90	-25	0

* Note: Advance to quarter-finals

== Knockout stage ==
Championship bracket

Quarter-finals
Wed 11 May 2016 – 14:00
(Angola) Progresso	24
(Republic of the Congo) ASEL	22
Wed 11 May 2016 – 14:00
(Cameroon) FAP Yaoundé	28
(Ivory Coast) Africa Sports	22
Wed 11 May 2016 – 16:00
(Cameroon) TKC	31
(Morocco) ASCUM	13
Wed 11 May 2016 – 18:00
(Angola) 1º de Agosto	37
(Democratic Republic of the Congo) Mikishi	17

Semi-finals
Thu 12 May 2016 – 14:00
(Cameroon) FAP Yaoundé	21
(Cameroon) TKC	23
Thu 12 May 2016 – 16:30
(Angola) 1º de Agosto	30
(Angola) Progresso	19

Final
Sat 14 May 2016 – 15:00
(Angola) 1º de Agosto	40
(Cameroon) TKC	16
Third place
Fri 13 May 2016 – 18:00
(Angola) Progresso	33
(Cameroon) FAP Yaoundé	30

5-8th bracket

5th-8th place
Thu 12 May 2016 – 12:00
(Republic of the Congo) ASEL	41
(Democratic Republic of the Congo) Mikishi	26
Thu 12 May 2016 – 14:00
(Morocco) ASCUM	12
(Ivory Coast) Africa Sports	31

Fifth place
Fri 13 May 2016 – 16:00
(Republic of the Congo) ASEL	31
(Ivory Coast) Africa Sports	24
Seventh place
Fri 13 May 2016 – 14:00
(Democratic Republic of the Congo) Mikishi	0
(Morocco) ASCUM	20

== Final standings ==
Rank	Team	Record
Gold medal	(Angola) Primeiro de Agosto	6–0
Silver medal	(Cameroon) TKC	5–1
Bronze medal	(Angola) Progresso	4–2
4	(Cameroon) FAP Yaoundé	3–3
5	(Republic of the Congo) ASEL	3–3
6	(Ivory Coast) Africa Sports	3–3
7	(Morocco) ASCUM	1–5
8	(Democratic Republic of the Congo) Mikishi	0–6

2016 African Women's Handball Cup Winners' Cup Winner

Clube Desportivo Primeiro de Agosto
2nd title

== See also ==
2016 African Women's Handball Champions League
