= 2010 African Women's Handball Cup Winners' Cup =

Tournament details
- Host country: Burkina Faso
- Venue(s): 1 (in 1 host city)
- Dates: April 7–17, 2010
- Teams: 8 (from 1 confederation)

Final positions
- Champions: (Angola) Petro Atlético (3rd title)
- Runners-up: (Cameroon) FAP Yaoundé
- Third place: (Algeria) GS Pétroliers
- Fourth place: (Cameroon) ABO Sport

The 2010 African Women's Handball Cup Winners' Cup was the 26th edition, organized by the African Handball Confederation, under the auspices of the International Handball Federation, the handball sport governing body. The tournament was held from April 7–17, 2010, at the Palais des Sports de Ouagadougou in Ouagadougou, Burkina Faso, contested by 8 teams and won by Atlético Petróleos de Luanda of Angola.

== Draw ==
Group A	Group B
(Burkina Faso) ASFAY (Cameroon) FAP Yaoundé (Ivory Coast) Rombo Sport (Angola) Petro Atlético	(Republic of the Congo) ABO Sport (Algeria) GS Pétroliers (Democratic Republic of the Congo) HC Héritage (Burkina Faso) LONAB

== Preliminary rounds ==
Times given below are in GMT UTC+0.

== Knockout stage ==
Championship bracket

Quarter-finals
Apr 2010
Apr 2010
Apr 2010
Apr 2010

Semi-finals
Fri 16 Apr 2010
Fri 16 Apr 2010

Final
Sat 17 Apr 2010
(Angola) Petro Atlético	32
(Cameroon) FAP Yaoundé	21
Third place
Sat 17 Apr 2010
(Algeria) GS Pétroliers
(Republic of the Congo) ABO Sport

5-8th bracket

5th-8th place
Thu 15 Apr 2010
Thu 15 Apr 2010

Fifth place
Fri 16 Apr 2010
Seventh place
Fri 16 Apr 2010

== Final standings ==
Rank	Team	Record
Gold medal	(Angola) Petro Atlético	–
Silver medal	(Cameroon) FAP Yaoundé	–
Bronze medal	(Algeria) GS Pétroliers	–
4	(Republic of the Congo) ABO Sport	–
5	(Ivory Coast) Rombo Sport	–
6	(Democratic Republic of the Congo) HC Héritage	–
7	(Burkina Faso) ASFAY	–
8	(Burkina Faso) LONAB	–

2010 African Women's Handball Cup Winners' Cup Winner

Atlético Petróleos de Luanda
3rd title

== See also ==
2010 African Women's Handball Champions League
