= 2018 African Handball Champions League =

Tournament details
- Host country: Ivory Coast
- Venues: 3 (in 1 host city)
- Dates: October 19–28
- Teams: 10 (from 1 confederation)

Final positions
- Champions: Zamalek
- Runners-up: Al Ahly

The 2018 African Handball Champions League was the 40th edition of the tournament. It is organized by the African Handball Confederation, under the auspices of the International Handball Federation. The tournament was held from October 19–28 at Ivory Coast.

The Zamalek Handball Club won the championship for the eleventh time. They defeated another Egyptian team, Al Ahly, with a score of 27-25 in the final.

== Draw ==
Group A	Group B
(Egypt) Al Ahly; Phoenix Gabon (Cameroon) FAP Yaoundé (Ivory Coast) Red Star (Burkina Faso) US des Forces Armées	(Egypt) Zamalek (Morocco) Raja Agadir (Democratic Republic of the Congo) JSK (Algeria) GSP

=== Group A ===
Fri, 19 Oct 2018
Al Ahly (Egypt)	24 (0:0) 17	(Cameroon) FAP Yaoundé
Red Star (Ivory Coast)	30 (0:0) 29	(Burkina Faso) US des Forces Armées
Sat, 20 Oct 2018
Phoenix Gabon	27 (14:14) 25	(Ivory Coast) Red Star
FAP Yaoundé (Cameroon)	33 (0:0) 18	(Burkina Faso) US des Forces Armées
Sun, 21 Oct 2018
Al Ahly (Egypt)	34 (0:0) 21	(Ivory Coast) Red Star
Phoenix Gabon	29 (0:0) 19	(Burkina Faso) US des Forces Armées
Mon, 22 Oct 2018
Phoenix Gabon	18 (0:0) 29	(Cameroon) FAP Yaoundé
Al Ahly (Egypt)	36 (0:0) 15	(Burkina Faso) US des Forces Armées
Wed, 24 Oct 2018
Al Ahly (Egypt)	28 (0:0) 20	Phoenix Gabon
FAP Yaoundé (Cameroon)	32 (0:0) 20	(Ivory Coast) Red Star

Team	Pld	W	D	L	GF	GA	GDIF	Pts
(Egypt) Al Ahly	4	4	0	0	122	73	+49	8
(Cameroon) FAP Yaoundé	4	3	0	1	111	80	+31	6
Phoenix Gabon	4	2	0	2	94	101	-7	4
(Ivory Coast) Red Star	4	1	0	3	96	122	-26	2
(Burkina Faso) US des Forces Armées	4	0	0	4	81	128	-47	0

- Note: Advance to quarter-finals

=== Group B ===
Fri, 19 Oct 2018
GSP (Algeria)	21 (9:11) 18	(Democratic Republic of the Congo) JSK
Sat, 20 Oct 2018
Zamalek (Egypt)	31 (0:0) 23	(Morocco) Raja Agadir
Mon, 22 Oct 2018
JSK (Democratic Republic of the Congo)	24 (0:0) 19	(Morocco) Raja Agadir
Zamalek (Egypt)	31 (0:0) 27	(Algeria) GSP
Wed, 24 Oct 2018
Zamalek (Egypt)	28 (0:0) 24	(Democratic Republic of the Congo) JSK
GSP (Algeria)	25 (0:0) 24	(Morocco) Raja Agadir

Team	Pld	W	D	L	GF	GA	GDIF	Pts
(Egypt) Zamalek	3	3	0	0	90	74	+16	6
(Algeria) GSP	3	2	0	1	73	73	0	4
(Democratic Republic of the Congo) JSK	3	1	0	2	66	68	-2	2
(Morocco) Raja Agadir	3	0	0	3	66	80	-14	0

- Note: Advance to quarter-finals

== Knockout stage ==
Championship bracket

Quarter-finals
Thu 25 Oct 2018 – 12:00
(Egypt) Al Ahly	31
(Morocco) Raja Agadir	20
Thu 25 Oct 2018 – 14:00
(Algeria) GSP	24
Phoenix Gabon	20
Thu 25 Oct 2018 – 16:00
(Egypt) Zamalek	34
(Ivory Coast) Red Star	21
Thu 25 Oct 2018 – 18:00
(Cameroon) FAP Yaoundé	27
(Democratic Republic of the Congo) JSK	28

Semi-finals
Fri 26 Oct 2018 – 19:00
(Egypt) Al Ahly	27
(Algeria) GSP	20
Fri 26 Oct 2018 – 16:30
(Egypt) Zamalek	30
(Democratic Republic of the Congo) JSK	25

Final
Sun 28 Oct 2018 – :
(Egypt) Zamalek	27
(Egypt) Al Ahly	25
Third place
Sun 28 Oct 2018 – :
(Algeria) GSP	33
(Democratic Republic of the Congo) JSK	31

5-8th bracket

5–8th place
Fri 26 Oct 2018 – 10:00
(Morocco) Raja Agadir	25
Phoenix Gabon	22
Fri 26 Oct 2018 – 10:00
(Cameroon) FAP Yaoundé	28
(Ivory Coast) Red Star	24

Fifth place
Sat 27 Oct 2018 – :
(Morocco) Raja Agadir	25
(Cameroon) FAP Yaoundé	24
Seventh place
Sat 27 Oct 2018 – :
(Ivory Coast) Red Star	27
Phoenix Gabon	25

== Final standings ==
Rank	Team	Record
Gold medal	(Egypt) Zamalek	6–0
Silver medal	(Egypt) Al Ahly	6–1
Bronze medal	(Algeria) GSP	4–2
4	(Democratic Republic of the Congo) JS Kinshasa	2–4
5	(Morocco) Raja Agadir	2–4
6	(Cameroon) FAP Yaoundé	4–3
7	(Ivory Coast) Red Star	2–5
8	Phoenix Gabon	2–5
9	(Burkina Faso) US des Forces Armées	0–4

== Awards ==
2018 African Handball Champions League winner

Al Zamalek Sporting Club
11th title

Best Player
