= Salim Nedjel =

Algerian handball player (born 1972)

Personal information
- Full name: Salim Nedjel Hammou
- Nationality: Algerian
- Born: 5 June 1972 (age 54) Oran, Algeria
- Height: 1.91 m (6 ft 3 in)

Sport
- Sport: Handball
- Position: Right wing

Youth career
- Years: Team
- –1990: IRB Oran

Senior clubs
- Years: Team
- 1990–1995: MC Oran
- 1994–1995: MM Batna
- 1995–1999: CB Cangas
- 1999–2003: AC Boulogne-Billancourt
- 2003–2004: US Créteil
- 2004–2005: Tremblay-en-France
- 2005–2006: Villemomble
National team
Years	Team	Apps	(Gls)
1993–2005	Algeria	?	(?)

Teams managed
- 2007–2010: Paris SG Youth
Medal record
Men's handball
Representing Algeria
African Championship
Silver medal – second place	1994 Tunisia	Team
Silver medal – second place	2000 Algeria	Team

Salim Nedjel Hammou (born 5 June 1972) is an Algerian handball player. He competed in the men's tournament at the 1996 Summer Olympics.
