= Mustapha Doballah =

Algerian handball player (born 1959)

Personal information
- Full name: Mustapha Doballah
- Nationality: Algerian
- Born: 25 April 1959 (age 67) Oran, Algeria

Sport
- Sport: Handball
- Current club: Retired

Senior clubs
- Years: Team
- 1977–????: (Algeria) MC Oran HB
National team
- Years: Team
- 1979–1990: Algeria

Mustapha Doballah (born 25 April 1959) is an Algerian handball player. He competed in the men's tournament at the 1984 Summer Olympics. He also took part in three World Men's Handball Championship on 1982, 1986 and 1990. He played with MC Oran HB.
