= 2017 African Women's Handball Cup Winners' Cup =

Tournament details
- Host country: Morocco
- Venue(s): 1 (in 1 host city)
- Dates: April 13–22
- Teams: 7 (from 1 confederation)

Final positions
- Champions: (Angola) 1º de Agosto (3rd title)
- Runner-up: (Cameroon) FAP Yaoundé
- Third place: (Republic of the Congo) CARA Brazzaville
- Fourth place: (Democratic Republic of the Congo) HC Vainqueur

Tournament statistics
- Matches played: 21
- Goals scored: 986 (46.95 per match)

The 2017 African Women's Handball Cup Winners' Cup was the 33rd edition, organized by the African Handball Confederation, under the auspices of the International Handball Federation, the handball sport governing body. The tournament was held from April 13–22, 2017 in one venue: the Salle Omnisport Al Inbiâat, in Agadir, Morocco, contested by 7 teams and won by 1º de Agosto of Angola thus successfully defending its title.

== Teams ==
Participating teams

(Republic of the Congo) CARA Brazzaville
(Cameroon) FAP Yaoundé
(Democratic Republic of the Congo) HC Vainqueur
(Nigeria) Kada Queens
(Angola) Primeiro de Agosto
(Madagascar) Tana HBC
(Morocco) US Nouasseur

== Schedule & results ==
Times given below are in WEST UTC+1.

Thu, 13 Apr 2017
12:00	US Nouasseur (Morocco)	25 (09:06) 15	(Madagascar) Tana HBC
14:00	CARA Brazzaville (Republic of the Congo)	25 (14:14) 30	(Cameroon) FAP Yaoundé
22:00	1º de Agosto (Angola)	32 (15:06) 10	(Democratic Republic of the Congo) HC Vainqueur
Sat, 15 Apr 2017
14:00	FAP Yaoundé (Cameroon)	26 (:) 17	(Nigeria) Kada Queens
16:00	HC Vainqueur (Democratic Republic of the Congo)	25 (11:11) 20	(Madagascar) Tana HBC
18:00	US Nouasseur (Morocco)	6 (03:18) 35	(Angola) 1º de Agosto
Sun, 16 Apr 2017
14:00	CARA Brazzaville (Republic of the Congo)	34 (:) 15	(Nigeria) Kada Queens
16:00	1º de Agosto (Angola)	39 (:) 4	(Madagascar) Tana HBC
18:00	HC Vainqueur (Democratic Republic of the Congo)	37 (16:10) 19	(Morocco) US Nouasseur
Tue, 18 Apr 2017
14:00	1º de Agosto (Angola)	34 (18:04) 15	(Nigeria) Kada Queens
16:00	FAP Yaoundé (Cameroon)	25 (13:06) 09	(Madagascar) Tana HBC
20:00	CARA Brazzaville (Republic of the Congo)	44 (19:03) 15	(Morocco) US Nouasseur
Wed, 19 Apr 2017
14:00	CARA Brazzaville (Republic of the Congo)	32 (16:08) 13	(Madagascar) Tana HBC
18:00	FAP Yaoundé (Cameroon)	36 (19:09) 17	(Morocco) US Nouasseur
20:00	Kada Queens (Nigeria)	23 (:) 27	(Democratic Republic of the Congo) HC Vainqueur
Thu, 20 Apr 2017
14:00	US Nouasseur (Morocco)	24 (10:10) 36	(Nigeria) Kada Queens
16:00	HC Vainqueur (Democratic Republic of the Congo)	18 (06:12) 32	(Cameroon) FAP Yaoundé
18:00	CARA Brazzaville (Republic of the Congo)	18 (08:13) 25	(Angola) 1º de Agosto
Sat, 22 Apr 2017
09:00	Tana HBC (Madagascar)	22 (12:13) 24	(Nigeria) Kada Queens
11:00	HC Vainqueur (Democratic Republic of the Congo)	16 (06:11) 27	(Republic of the Congo) CARA Brazzaville
14:00	1º de Agosto (Angola)	24 (14:08) 16	(Cameroon) FAP Yaoundé

Team	Pld	W	D	L	GF	GA	GDIF	Pts
(Angola) 1º de Agosto	6	6	0	0	189	69	+120	12
(Cameroon) FAP Yaoundé	6	5	0	1	165	110	+50	10
(Republic of the Congo) CARA Brazzaville	6	4	0	2	180	114	+66	8
(Democratic Republic of the Congo) HC Vainqueur	6	3	0	3	133	153	-20	6
(Nigeria) Kada Queens	6	2	0	4	130	167	-37	4
(Morocco) US Nouasseur	6	1	0	5	106	203	-85	2
(Madagascar) Tana HBC	6	0	0	6	83	170	-87	0

== Final standings ==
Rank	Team	Record
Gold medal	(Angola) Primeiro de Agosto	6–0
Silver medal	(Cameroon) FAP Yaoundé	5–1
Bronze medal	(Republic of the Congo) CARA Brazzaville	4–2
4	(Democratic Republic of the Congo) HC Vainqueur	3–3
5	(Nigeria) Kada Queens	2–4
6	(Morocco) US Nouasseur	1–5
7	(Madagascar) Tana HBC	0–6

2017 African Women's Handball Cup Winners' Cup Winner

Clube Desportivo Primeiro de Agosto
3rd title

== See also ==
2017 African Women's Handball Champions League
