= 2012 African Handball Champions League =

Tournament details
- Host country: Morocco
- Venue(s): 2 (in 1 host city)
- Dates: November 15–24
- Teams: 16

Final positions
- Champions: (Egypt) Al Ahly (4th title)
- Runner-up: (Egypt) Zamalek
- Third place: (Tunisia) Espérance Tunis
- Fourth place: (Algeria) JSE Skikda

The 2012 African Handball Champions League was the 34th edition, organized by the African Handball Confederation, under the auspices of the International Handball Federation, the handball sport governing body. The tournament was held from November 15–24 in Tangier, Morocco, contested by 16 teams and won by Al Ahly Cairo of Egypt.

== Draw ==
Group A	Group B	Group C
(Libya) Al Ahly Tripoli (Cameroon) FAP Yaoundé (Morocco) IR Tanger (Algeria) JSE Skikda (Rwanda) Police HBC (Gabon) Stade Mandji	(Libya) Al-Nasr SC (Republic of the Congo) Étoile du Congo (Morocco) Mouloudia (Ivory Coast) SOA (Egypt) Zamalek	(Egypt) Al Ahly (Tunisia) Espérance Tunis (Democratic Republic of the Congo) JS Kinshasa (Algeria) Olympique El Oued (Angola) Primeiro de Agosto

== Preliminary round ==
Times given below are in WET UTC+0.

=== Group A ===
Thu, 15 Nov 2012
IR Tanger (Morocco)	51 : 20	(Rwanda) Police HBC
JSE Skikda (Algeria)	24 : 24	(Cameroon) FAP Yaoundé
Al Ahly Tripoli (Libya)	19 : 26	(Gabon) Stade Mandji
Sat, 17 Nov 2012
JSE Skikda (Algeria)	51 : 27	(Rwanda) Police HBC
Al Ahly Tripoli (Libya)	24 : 25	(Cameroon) FAP Yaoundé
IR Tanger (Morocco)	25 : 23	(Gabon) Stade Mandji
Sun, 18 Nov 2012
Stade Mandji (Gabon)	20 : 30	(Cameroon) FAP Yaoundé
IR Tanger (Morocco)	23 : 28	(Algeria) JSE Skikda
Al Ahly Tripoli (Libya)	36 : 27	(Rwanda) Police HBC
19 November, 2012
FAP Yaoundé (Cameroon)	49 : 25	(Rwanda) Police HBC
IR Tanger (Morocco)	20 : 16	(Libya) Al Ahly Tripoli
JSE Skikda (Algeria)	32 : 27	(Gabon) Stade Mandji
Tue, 20 Nov 2012
JSE Skikda (Algeria)	31 : 16	(Libya) Al Ahly Tripoli
Stade Mandji (Gabon)	40 : 20	(Rwanda) Police HBC
IR Tanger (Morocco)	25 : 18	(Cameroon) FAP Yaoundé

Team	Pld	W	D	L	GF	GA	GDIF	Pts
(Algeria) JSE Skikda	5	4	1	0	166	126	+40	9
(Morocco) IR Tanger	5	4	0	1	144	105	+39	8
(Cameroon) FAP Yaoundé	5	3	1	1	146	118	+28	7
(Gabon) Stade Mandji	5	2	0	3	136	126	+10	4
(Libya) Al Ahly Tripoli	5	1	0	4	120	129	-9	2
(Rwanda) Police HBC	5	0	0	5	119	227	-108	0

* Note: Advance to quarter-finals
Relegated to 9-12th classification
Relegated to 13-16th classification

=== Group B ===
Thu, 15 Nov 2012
Mouloudia (Morocco)	20 : 0	(Ivory Coast) SOA
Al-Nasr SC (Libya)	30 : 28	(Republic of the Congo) Étoile du Congo
Sat, 17 Nov 2012
Zamalek (Egypt)	34 : 23	(Libya) Al-Nasr SC
Mouloudia (Morocco)	28 : 28	(Republic of the Congo) Étoile du Congo
Sun, 18 Nov 2012
SOA (Ivory Coast)	16 : 30	(Egypt) Zamalek
Mouloudia (Morocco)	29 : 31	(Libya) Al-Nasr SC
Mon, 19 Nov 2012
Étoile du Congo (Republic of the Congo)	31 : 27	(Ivory Coast) SOA
Zamalek (Egypt)	26 : 18	(Morocco) Mouloudia
Tue, 20 Nov 2012
Al-Nasr SC (Libya)	20 : 25	(Ivory Coast) SOA
Étoile du Congo (Republic of the Congo)	30 : 37	(Egypt) Zamalek

Team	Pld	W	D	L	GF	GA	GDIF	Pts
(Egypt) Zamalek	4	4	0	0	127	87	+40	8
(Morocco) Mouloudia	4	2	1	1	78	85	-7	5
(Republic of the Congo) Étoile du Congo	4	2	1	2	117	122	-5	5
(Ivory Coast) SOA	4	2	0	2	68	84	-16	2
(Libya) Al-Nasr SC **	4	2	0	2	104	116	-12	0

* Note: Advance to quarter-finals
Relegated to 9-12th classification
Relegated to 13-16th classification
** Al Nasr lost their four games for fielding an ineligible player

=== Group C ===
Thu, 15 Nov 2012
1º de Agosto (Angola)	31 : 24	(Algeria) Olympique El Oued
Al Ahly (Egypt)	18 : 20	(Tunisia) Espérance Tunis
Sat, 17 Nov 2012
Espérance Tunis (Tunisia)	29 : 19	(Angola) 1º de Agosto
Olympique El Oued (Algeria)	37 : 25	(Democratic Republic of the Congo) JS Kinshasa
Sun, 18 Nov 2012
Al Ahly (Egypt)	38 : 26	(Democratic Republic of the Congo) JS Kinshasa
Espérance Tunis (Tunisia)	34 : 26	(Algeria) Olympique El Oued
Mon, 19 Nov 2012
Al Ahly (Egypt)	36 : 20	(Algeria) Olympique El Oued
1º de Agosto (Angola)	26 : 22	(Democratic Republic of the Congo) JS Kinshasa
Tue, 20 Nov 2012
Al Ahly (Egypt)	22 : 17	(Angola) 1º de Agosto
Espérance Tunis (Tunisia)	43 : 24	(Democratic Republic of the Congo) JS Kinshasa

Team	Pld	W	D	L	GF	GA	GDIF	Pts
(Tunisia) Espérance Tunis	4	4	0	0	126	87	+39	8
(Egypt) Al Ahly	4	3	0	1	114	83	+31	6
(Angola) 1º de Agosto	4	2	0	2	93	97	-4	4
(Algeria) Olymp El Oued	4	1	0	3	107	126	-19	2
(Democratic Republic of the Congo) JS Kinshasa	4	0	0	4	97	144	-47	0

* Note: Advance to quarter-finals
Relegated to 9-12th classification
Relegated to 13-16th classification

== Knockout stage ==
Championship bracket

Quarter-finals
Thu 22 Nov 2012 – 16:00
(Morocco) HC Mouloudia	20
(Egypt) Al Ahly SC	23
Thu 22 Nov 2012 – 18:00
(Morocco) IR Tanger	20
(Tunisia) Espérance Tunis	30
Thu 22 Nov 2012 – 20:00
(Egypt) Zamalek	25
(Cameroon) FAP Yaoundé	15
Thu 22 Nov 2012 – 20:00
(Algeria) JSE Skikda	29
(Republic of the Congo) Étoile du Congo	27

Semi-finals
Fri 23 Nov 2012 – 16:00
(Egypt) Al Ahly SC	24
(Tunisia) Espérance Tunis	23
Fri 23 Nov 2012 – 20:00
(Egypt) Zamalek	28
(Algeria) JSE Skikda	23

Final
Sat 24 Nov 2012 – 12:00
(Egypt) Al Ahly SC	21
(Egypt) Zamalek	17
Third place
Sat 24 Nov 2012 – 11:00
(Tunisia) Espérance Tunis	32
(Algeria) JSE Skikda	23

5-8th bracket

5–8th place
Fri 23 Nov 2012 – 10:00
(Republic of the Congo) Étoile du Congo	23
(Cameroon) FAP Yaoundé	28
Fri 23 Nov 2012 – 20:00
(Morocco) Mouloudia	28
(Morocco) IR Tanger	29

Fifth place
Sat 24 Nov 2012 – 14:00
(Cameroon) FAP Yaoundé	31
(Morocco) IR Tanger	30
Seventh place
Sat 24 Nov 2012 – 12:30
(Republic of the Congo) Étoile du Congo	31
(Morocco) Mouloudia	30

9-12th bracket

9–12th place
Fri 23 Nov 2012 – 12:00
(Gabon) Stade Mandji	29
(Algeria) Olymp El Oued	26
Fri 23 Nov 2012 – 14:00
(Ivory Coast) SOA	21
(Angola) 1º de Agosto	30

Ninth place
Sat 24 Nov 2012 – 09:30
(Gabon) Stade Mandji	24
(Angola) 1º de Agosto	23
Eleventh place
Sat 24 Nov 2012 – 12:30
(Algeria) Olymp El Oued	33
(Ivory Coast) SOA	24

13-16th bracket

13–16th place
Fri 23 Nov 2012 – 08:00
(Libya) Al-Nasr SC	33
(Democratic Republic of the Congo) JS Kinshasa	27
Fri 23 Nov 2012 – 10:00
(Libya) Al Ahly Tripoli	34
(Rwanda) Police HBC	15

Thirteenth place
Sat 24 Nov 2012 – 11:00
(Libya) Al Ahly Tripoli	27
(Libya) Al-Nasr SC	28
Fifteenth place
Sat 24 Nov 2012 – 11:00
(Democratic Republic of the Congo) JS Kinshasa	47
(Rwanda) Police HBC	27

== Final ranking ==
Rank	Team	Record
Gold medal	(Egypt) Al Ahly SC	6–1
Silver medal	(Egypt) Zamalek	6–1
Bronze medal	(Tunisia) Espérance Tunis	6–1
4	(Algeria) JSE Skikda	5–2
5	(Cameroon) FAP Yaoundé	5–2
6	(Morocco) IR Tanger	5–3
7	(Republic of the Congo) Étoile du Congo	3–4
8	(Morocco) Mouloudia	2–4
9	(Gabon) Stade Mandji	4–3
10	(Angola) Primeiro de Agosto	3–3
11	(Algeria) Olympique El Oued	2–4
12	(Ivory Coast) SOA	2–4
13	(Libya) Al-Nasr SC	4–2
14	(Libya) Al Ahly Tripoli	2–5
15	(Democratic Republic of the Congo) JS Kinshasa	1–5
16	(Rwanda) Police HBC	0–7

== Awards ==
2012 African Handball Champions Cup Winner

Al Ahly Handball Club
4th title

Best Player

== See also ==
- 2012 African Handball Championship
