= 2013 African Women's Handball Cup Winners' Cup =

29th African Women's Handball Cup Winners' Cup

Tournament details
- Host country: Tunisia
- Venue(s): 1 (in 1 host city)
- Dates: April 18–27
- Teams: 9 (from 1 confederation)

Final positions
- Champions: (Angola) Petro Atlético (6th title)
- Runner-up: (Republic of the Congo) Inter Club Brazzaville
- Third place: (Democratic Republic of the Congo) HC Héritage
- Fourth place: (Cameroon) FAP Yaoundé

Tournament statistics
- Matches played: 28
- Goals scored: 1,349 (48.18 per match)

The 2013 African Women's Handball Cup Winners' Cup was the 29th edition, organized by the African Handball Confederation, under the auspices of the International Handball Federation, the handball sport governing body. The tournament was held from April 18–27, 2013 in Hammamet, Tunisia and contested by 9 teams.

Atlético Petróleos de Luanda won the competition for the sixth time in the row, after defeating Inter Club Brazzaville in the finale HC Héritage from DR Congo is third

== Draw ==
Group A	Group B
(Tunisia) Amal Tazarka (Democratic Republic of the Congo) HC Héritage (Republic of the Congo) Inter Club (Angola) Petro Atlético	(Ivory Coast) Africa Sports (Tunisia) Ariana (Cameroon) FAP Yaoundé (Algeria) Gdyel; Phoenix Gabon

== Preliminary rounds ==
Times given below are in CET UTC+1.

=== Group A ===
Fri, 19 Apr 2013
HC Héritage (Democratic Republic of the Congo)	25 (12:14) 23	(Republic of the Congo) Inter Club
Petro Atlético (Angola)	30 (17:03) 10	(Tunisia) Amal Tazarka
Sat, 20 Apr 2013
Inter Club (Republic of the Congo)	22 (08:13) 30	(Angola) Petro Atlético
Amal Tazarka (Tunisia)	21 (10:12) 28	(Democratic Republic of the Congo) HC Héritage
Mon, 22 Apr 2013
Petro Atlético (Angola)	26 (13:08) 16	(Democratic Republic of the Congo) HC Héritage
Amal Tazarka (Tunisia)	33 (19:16) 30	(Republic of the Congo) Inter Club

Team	Pld	W	D	L	GF	GA	GDIF	Pts
(Angola) Petro Atlético	3	3	0	0	86	48	+38	6
(Democratic Republic of the Congo) HC Héritage	3	2	0	1	69	70	-1	4
(Tunisia) Amal Tazarka	3	1	0	2	64	88	-24	2
(Republic of the Congo) Inter Club	3	0	0	3	75	88	-13	0

* Note: Advance to quarter-finals

=== Group B ===
Thu, 18 Apr 2013
FAP Yaoundé (Cameroon)	24 (11:12) 22	Phoenix Gabon
Gdyel (Algeria)	23 (12:11) 27	(Tunisia) Ariana
Fri, 19 Apr 2013
Gdyel (Algeria)	22 (13:12) 24	Phoenix Gabon
FAP Yaoundé (Cameroon)	26 (12:13) 25	(Ivory Coast) Africa Sports
Sat, 20 Apr 2013
Gdyel (Algeria)	21 (10:12) 28	(Ivory Coast) Africa Sports
Phoenix Gabon	20 (11:09) 18	(Tunisia) Ariana
Sun, 21 Apr 2013
FAP Yaoundé (Cameroon)	21 (14:06) 19	(Algeria) Gdyel
Africa Sports (Ivory Coast)	22 (15:16) 26	(Tunisia) Ariana
Mon, 22 Apr 2013
FAP Yaoundé (Cameroon)	21 (09:12) 20	(Tunisia) Ariana
Phoenix Gabon	26 (14:15) 31	(Ivory Coast) Africa Sports

Team	Pld	W	D	L	GF	GA	GDIF	Pts
(Cameroon) FAP Yaoundé	4	4	0	0	92	86	+6	8
(Ivory Coast) Africa Sports	4	2	0	2	106	99	+7	4
Phoenix Gabon	4	2	0	2	92	95	-3	4
(Tunisia) Ariana	4	2	0	2	91	86	+5	4
(Algeria) Gdyel	4	0	0	4	85	100	-15	0

* Note: Advance to quarter-finals

== Knockout stage ==
Championship bracket

Quarter-finals
Wed 24 Apr 2013 – 14:00
(Angola) Petro Atlético	33
(Tunisia) Ariana	20
Wed 24 Apr 2013 – 18:00
(Cameroon) FAP Yaoundé	22
(Tunisia) Amal Tazarka	13
Wed 24 Apr 2013 – 16:00
(Ivory Coast) Africa Sports	26
(Republic of the Congo) Inter Club	28
Wed 24 Apr 2013 – 18:00
(Democratic Republic of the Congo) HC Héritage	25
(Gabon) Phoenix	14

Semi-finals
Thu 25 Apr 2013 – 15:30
(Angola) Petro Atlético	35
(Cameroon) FAP Yaoundé	16
Thu 25 Apr 2013 – 18:00
(Democratic Republic of the Congo) HC Héritage	21
(Republic of the Congo) Inter Club	27

Final
Sat 27 Apr 2013 – 15:30
(Angola) Petro Atlético	37
(Republic of the Congo) Inter Club	32
Third place
Sat 27 Apr 2013 – 16:00
(Cameroon) FAP Yaoundé	24
(Democratic Republic of the Congo) HC Héritage	26

5-8th bracket

5th-8th place
Thu 25 Apr 2013 – 14:00
(Tunisia) Ariana	21
(Ivory Coast) Africa Sports	26
Thu 25 Apr 2013 – 16:00
(Tunisia) Amal Tazarka	23
Phoenix Gabon	29

Fifth place
Fri 26 Apr 2013 – 18:00
Phoenix Gabon	18
(Ivory Coast) Africa Sports	22
Seventh place
Fri 26 Apr 2013 – 13:00
(Tunisia) Ariana	33
(Tunisia) Amal Tazarka	18

== Final standings ==
Rank	Team	Record
Gold medal	(Angola) Petro Atlético	6–0
Silver medal	(Republic of the Congo) Inter Club	2–4
Bronze medal	(Democratic Republic of the Congo) HC Héritage	4–2
4	(Cameroon) FAP Yaoundé	5–2
5	(Ivory Coast) Africa Sports	4–3
6	(Tunisia) Ariana	3–4
7	Phoenix Gabon	3–4
8	(Tunisia) Amal Tazarka	1–5
9	(Algeria) HBC Gdyel	0–4

2013 African Women's Handball Cup Winners' Cup Winner

Atlético Petróleos de Luanda
6th title

== See also ==
- African Women's Handball Cup Winners' Cup
- 2013 African Women's Handball Champions League
- 2013 African Men's Handball Cup Winners' Cup
