= 2012 African Women's Handball Cup Winners' Cup =

Tournament details
- Host country: Tunisia
- Venue(s): 3 (in 1 host city)
- Dates: 21–29 April 2012
- Teams: 6 (from 1 confederation)

Final positions
- Champions: (Angola) Petro Atlético (5th title)
- Runner-up: (Ivory Coast) Africa Sports
- Third place: (Cameroon) FAP Yaoundé
- Fourth place: (Democratic Republic of the Congo) HC Héritage

Tournament statistics
- Matches played: 18

The 2012 African Women's Handball Cup Winners' Cup was the 28th edition, organized by the African Handball Confederation, under the auspices of the International Handball Federation, the handball sport governing body. The tournament was held from April 21–29, 2012 in Beni Khiar, Nabeul and Tazarka, Tunisia, contested by 6 teams and won by Atlético Petróleos de Luanda of Angola.

== Schedule & results ==
Sat, 21 Apr 2012
Petro Atlético (Angola)	27 : 19	(Tunisia) ES Rejiche
FAP Yaoundé (Cameroon)	16 : 20	(Democratic Republic of the Congo) HC Héritage
Africa Sports (Ivory Coast)	30 : 16	(Nigeria) Borno State
Sun, 22 Apr 2012
Borno State (Nigeria)	16 : 30	(Angola) Petro Atlético
ES Rejiche (Tunisia)	21 : 25	(Cameroon) FAP Yaoundé
HC Héritage (Democratic Republic of the Congo)	20 : 20	(Ivory Coast) Africa Sports
Tue, 24 Apr 2012
FAP Yaoundé (Cameroon)	24 : 28	(Ivory Coast) Africa Sports
Petro Atlético (Angola)	27 : 9	(Democratic Republic of the Congo) HC Héritage
Borno State (Nigeria)	:	(Tunisia) ES Rejiche
Thu, 26 Apr 2012
Africa Sports (Ivory Coast)	13 : 24	(Angola) Petro Atlético
ES Rejiche (Tunisia)	:	(Democratic Republic of the Congo) HC Héritage
FAP Yaoundé (Cameroon)	:	(Nigeria) Borno State
Sun, 29 Apr 2012
Petro Atlético	25 : 18	FAP Yaoundé
HC Héritage (Democratic Republic of the Congo)	:	(Nigeria) Borno State
Africa Sports (Ivory Coast)	:	(Tunisia) ES Rejiche

P	Team	Pld	W	D	L	GF	GA	GDIF	Pts
Gold medal	(Angola) Petro Atlético	5	5	0	0	137	69	+68	10
Silver medal	(Ivory Coast) Africa Sports	5							
Bronze medal	(Cameroon) FAP Yaoundé	5							
4									
5									
6									

== Final standings ==
Rank	Team	Record
Gold medal	(Angola) Petro Atlético	5–0
Silver medal	(Ivory Coast) Africa Sports	4–1
Bronze medal	(Cameroon) FAP Yaoundé	3–2
4	(Democratic Republic of the Congo) HC Héritage	–
5		–
6		–
7		–

2012 African Women's Handball Cup Winners' Cup Winner

Atlético Petróleos de Luanda
5th title
