= Progresso Associação do Sambizanga (handball) =

Angolan handball club

- Full name: Progresso Associação do Sambizanga
- Short name: Progresso do Sambizanga
- Arena: Campo do Gama; Campo do CDUA
- Capacity: 500
- President: (Angola) Paixão Júnior
- Head coach: (Ukraine) Victor Tchikoulaev
- League: Angola League; Angola Cup; Angola Super Cup
- Club colours
Home	Away

The Progresso Associação do Sambizanga sports club has a women's handball team competing at the local level, at the Luanda Provincial Handball Championship and at the Angola National Handball Championship.

The club's major sponsor is the Angolan state-owned bank Banco de Poupança e Crédito (BPC).

The team made its debut at the Angolan Handball League in 2012.

== Honours ==
- National Championship:
  - Winner (0):
  - Runner Up (0) :
- Angola Cup:
  - Winner (0):
  - Runner Up (0) :
- Angola Super Cup:
  - Winner (0):
  - Runner Up (0) :
- CHAB Club Champions Cup:
  - Winner (0):
  - Runner Up (0) :
- CHAB Babacar Fall Super Cup:
  - Winner (0):
  - Runner Up (0) :
- CHAB Cup Winner's Cup:
  - Winner (0):
  - Runner Up (0) :

== Squad ==
Updated as of June 2016

Progresso do Sambizanga Handball squad
Goalkeepers

 01  Neyde Barbosa 36-177-85
 12  Gloria Mayala
 24  Wilma Luceu 22-182-98

Wingers

 06  Acilene Raúl 29-176-80
 10  Esmeralda Miguel 24-169-65
 32  Honorina Matumona

Back players

 02  Inês Domingos
 08  Suzete Cazanga 23-172-70
 16  Janete Manuel
 18  Eugênia Domingos Tuchinha 25-164-62
 19  Matilde André 29-175-68
 29  Lourena Carlos Lau 27-173-69

Line players

 03  Mpy Sidona
 25  Constantina Paulo Saldanha 32-192-88
 35  Anastácia Sibo 33-187-98

Other players

 21  Norla Miguel

Technical staff

      Victor Tchikoulaev Head Coach 
      José de Carvalho  Administrator

=== Players ===
Progresso do Sambizanga handball players 2011–2016

Nat	#	Name	A	P	H	W	–	–	Armando Gumbe			V.T.	–
Nat	#	Name	A	P	H	W	2011	2012	2013	2014	2015	2016	2017
Nat	#	Name	A	P	H	W	–	7	5	4	5	4	–
(Angola)	⋅	Acilene Raúl	29	P	1.76	80	⋅	⋅	⋅	⋅	⋅	6	⋅
(Angola)	⋅	Albertina Mambrio Jane	22	B	1.80	96	⋅	⋅	⋅	7	⋅	⋅	⋅
(Republic of the Congo)	⋅	Alphonsine Ngoulou	20	B	1.80	65	⋅	⋅	⋅	20	23	⋅	⋅
(Angola)	⋅	Anastácia Sibo	34	P	1.87	98	⋅	⋅	⋅	⋅	35	35	⋅
(Angola)	⋅	Antónia dos Santos Luena	19	B			⋅	⋅	2	→	⋅	⋅	⋅
(Angola)	⋅	Antonica Roque	23	W	1.80	64	⋅	⋅	17	17	21	⋅	⋅
(Angola)	⋅	Beatriz Manuel	–	W			⋅	⋅	9	9	⋅	⋅	⋅
(Angola)	⋅	Cássia Assis	–	P	1.80		⋅	⋅	13	13	→	⋅	⋅
(Angola)	⋅	Constantina Paulo Saldanha	33	P	1.92	88	⋅	⋅	⋅	6	25	25	⋅
(Angola)	⋅	Elga Quimeia	–	P			⋅	⋅	⋅	5	⋅	⋅	⋅
(Angola)	⋅	Esmeralda Miguel	24	W	169	65	⋅	⋅	10	10	10	10	⋅
(Angola)	⋅	Esperança Filipe	–	–			⋅	⋅	–	⋅	⋅	⋅	⋅
(Angola)	⋅	Eugênia Domingos Tuchinha	26	B	1.64	62	⋅	⋅	⋅	⋅	18	18	⋅
(Angola)	⋅	Glória Mayala	–	GK			⋅	⋅	⋅	⋅	12	12	⋅
(Angola)	⋅	Gracinda Neto	–	B			⋅	⋅	⋅	16	⋅	⋅	⋅
(Angola)	⋅	Honorina Matumona	–	W			⋅	⋅	⋅	4	32	32	⋅
(Angola)	⋅	Ilda Bengue	39	W	1.77	90	⋅	⋅	16	⋅	⋅	⋅	⋅
(Angola)	⋅	Inês Domingos	–	B			⋅	⋅	⋅	⋅	⋅	2	⋅
(Angola)	⋅	Iovânia Quinzole	22	W	1.70		⋅	⋅	⋅	8	⋅	⋅	⋅
(Angola)	⋅	Ivete Simão	24	GK	1.77	75	⋅	⋅	1	1	1	⋅	⋅
(Angola)	⋅	Janete dos Santos	25	W	1.74	68	⋅	⋅	⋅	⋅	31	31	⋅
(Angola)	⋅	Janete Manuel	–	B			⋅	⋅	⋅	11	16	16	⋅
(Angola)	⋅	Lourena Carlos Lau	28	B	1.73	69	⋅	⋅	⋅	15	5	29	⋅
(Angola)	⋅	Lucélia Mário	19	B			⋅	⋅	–	⋅	⋅	⋅	⋅
(Angola)	⋅	Maravilha Luís	25	B	1.64	72	⋅	⋅	⋅	⋅	7	⋅	⋅
(Angola)	⋅	Maria Jaime	–	GK			⋅	⋅	⋅	–	⋅	⋅	⋅
(Republic of the Congo)	⋅	Mariette Mpima	31	B			⋅	⋅	⋅	2	2	⋅	⋅
(Angola)	⋅	Matilde André	30	B	1.75	68	⋅	⋅	⋅	⋅	19	19	⋅
(Angola)	⋅	Maura Rufino	–	W			⋅	⋅	3	3	⋅	⋅	⋅
(Republic of the Congo)	⋅	Mpy Sidona	–	P			⋅	⋅	⋅	⋅	3	3	⋅
(Angola)	⋅	Nelma Pedro	–	B			⋅	⋅	⋅	33	29	⋅	⋅
(Angola)	⋅	Neusa Quimaz	–	P			⋅	⋅	⋅	⋅	6	⋅	⋅
(Angola)	⋅	Neyde Barbosa	36	GK	1.77	85	⋅	⋅	⋅	⋅	⋅	1	⋅
(Angola)	⋅	Norla Miguel	–				⋅	⋅	⋅	⋅	⋅	21	⋅
(Angola)	⋅	Paula Diulo	–	–			⋅	⋅	–	⋅	⋅	⋅	⋅
(Angola)	⋅	Ruth Kalunga	–	–			⋅	⋅	–	⋅	⋅	⋅	⋅
(Angola)	⋅	Silma da Costa	–	–			⋅	⋅	–	⋅	⋅	⋅	⋅
(Angola)	⋅	Soraya Bessa	–	–			⋅	⋅	–	⋅	⋅	⋅	⋅
(Angola)	⋅	Stella Domingos	19	B			⋅	⋅	–	⋅	⋅	⋅	⋅
(Angola)	⋅	Suzete Cazanga	24	B	1.72	70	⋅	⋅	⋅	⋅	8	8	⋅
(Angola)	⋅	Wilma Luceu	22	GK	1.82	98	⋅	⋅	24	24	24	24	⋅

== Managers ==
(Angola)	Armando Gumbe	2013, 2014, 2015
(Ukraine)	Victor Tchikoulaev	2016

== See also ==
- Progresso do Sambizanga Football
- Progresso do Sambizanga Basketball
- Federação Angolana de Andebol
