= Djaffar Bel Hocine =

Algerian handball player (born 1961)

Personal information
- Nationality: Algerian
- Born: 18 August 1961 (age 65)

Sport
- Sport: Handball
- Position: Right wing
- Current club: Retired

Senior clubs
- Years: Team
- 1982–1986: (Algeria) Nadit Alger
- 1987–1993: (Algeria) MC Alger
National team
- Years: Team
- 1981–1993: Algeria

Teams managed
- 1995–1996: Algeria
- 1999: Algeria
- 1999–2002: (United Arab Emirates) Al Nasr Dubai

Djaffar Bel Hocine (born 18 August 1961) is an Algerian handball player and coach. He competed in the men's tournament at the 1984 Summer Olympics.
