= Algerian Handball Cup =

- Founded: 1966
- Country: Algeria
- Confederation: CAHB
- Most recent champion: O El Oued (2024–25)
- Most titles: MC Alger (30 titles)
- International cup: Cup Winners' Cup
- 2025-26 Algerian Handball Cup

The Algerian Handball Cup is an elimination handball tournament held annually in Algeria. It is the second most important national title in Algerian handball after the Algerian Handball Championship. It started in 1962.

== Winners ==
FA Cup winners
| Season | Winners | Score | Runners–up | Venue |
|---|---|---|---|---|
| 1966–67 | CR Belcourt | 4–3 | MC Saïda | Ouaguenouni Stadium, Algiers |
| 1967–68 | USM Annaba | 17–9 | CS Oran | Ouaguenouni Stadium, Algiers |
| 1968–69 | GCS Alger | 9–5 | USM Annaba | Ouaguenouni Stadium, Algiers |
| 1969–70 | GCS Alger | 27–11 | JSM Skikda | Ouaguenouni Stadium, Algiers |
| 1970–71 | CSS Kouba | 12–4 | CSS Annaba | Ouaguenouni Stadium, Algiers |
| 1971–72 | Nadit Alger | 18–13 | Gendarmerie Nationale | Ouaguenouni Stadium, Algiers |
| 1972–73 | Nadit Alger | 14–8 | CS DNC Alger | Ouaguenouni Stadium, Algiers |
| 1973–74 | NAR Alger | 14–7 | NAR Annaba | Ouaguenouni Stadium, Algiers |
| 1974–75 | CS DNC Alger | 15–14 (a.e.t.) | Nadit Alger | Hacène Harcha Arena, Algiers |
| 1975–76 | Nadit Alger | 17–15 (a.e.t.) | CS DNC Alger | Hacène Harcha Arena, Algiers |
| 1976–77 | CS DNC Alger | 25–18 | NA Hussein Dey | DMS Indoor Hall, Algiers |
| 1977–78 | Not played | | | |
| 1978–79 | Nadit Alger | 20–13 | MP Oran | Hacène Harcha Arena, Algiers |
| 1979–80 | Nadit Alger | 23–20 | MP Alger | Hacène Harcha Arena, Algiers |
| 1980–81 | CS DNC Alger | 24–20 | Nadit Alger | Hacène Harcha Arena, Algiers |
| 1981–82 | MP Alger | 21–17 | MP Oran | Hacène Harcha Arena, Algiers |
| 1982–83 | MP Alger | 14–9 | MA Hussein Dey | Hacène Harcha Arena, Algiers |
| 1983–84 | MP Oran | 15–14 | MA Hussein Dey | Hacène Harcha Arena, Algiers |
| 1984–85 | Nadit Alger | 16–15 | MP Oran | Hacène Harcha Arena, Algiers |
| 1985–86 | MP Oran | 13–11 | ERC Alger | Hacène Harcha Arena, Algiers |
| 1986–87 | MP Alger | 26–18 | HBC El Biar | Hacène Harcha Arena, Algiers |
| 1987–88 | JSB Alger | 24–24 (a.e.t.) (10–9 p) | MC Oran | Hacène Harcha Arena, Algiers |
| 1988–89 | MC Alger | 15–13 | MC Oran | Hacène Harcha Arena, Algiers |
| 1989–90 | MC Alger | 20–17 (a.e.t.) | IRB/ERC Alger | Hacène Harcha Arena, Algiers |
| 1990–91 | MC Alger | 20–19 (a.e.t.) | Nadit Alger | Hacène Harcha Arena, Algiers |
| 1991–92 | Not played | | | |
| 1992–93 | MC Alger | 14–12 | IRB/ERC Alger | Hacène Harcha Arena, Algiers |
| 1993–94 | MC Alger | 24–15 | SR Annaba | Hacène Harcha Arena, Algiers |
| 1994–95 | MC Alger | 19–17 | IRB/ERC Alger | Hacène Harcha Arena, Algiers |
| 1995–96 | IRB/ERC Alger | 17–15 | MC Alger | Hacène Harcha Arena, Algiers |
| 1996–97 | MC Alger | 24–20 | MA Hussein Dey | |
| 1997–98 | MC Alger | 19–16 | OC Alger | Hacène Harcha Arena, Algiers |
| 1998–99 | MC Alger | 23–17 | MC Oran | Hacène Harcha Arena, Algiers |
| 1999–00 | MC Alger | 27–26 (a.e.t.) | WB Skikda | Hacène Harcha Arena, Algiers |
| 2000–01 | MC Alger | 25 – 20 | OC Alger | Salle Hacène Harcha, Algiers |
| 2001–02 | MC Alger | 37 – 31 | C Chelghoum Laïd | Salle Hacène Harcha, Algiers |
| 2002–03 | MC Alger | 27 – 21 | US Biskra | Salle Hacène Harcha, Algiers |
| 2003–04 | MC Alger | 27 – 23 | OC Alger | Salle Hacène Harcha, Algiers |
| 2004–05 | MC Alger | 27 – 25 | US Biskra | Salle Hacène Harcha, Algiers |
| 2005–06 | MC Alger | 32 – 26 | JSE Skikda | Salle Hacène Harcha, Algiers |
| 2006–07 | MC Alger | 38 – 22 | MC Saïda | Salle Hacène Harcha, Algiers |
| 2007–08 | MC Alger | 22 – 18 | CRB Baraki | Salle Hacène Harcha, Algiers |
| 2008–09 | GS Pétroliers | 34 – 21 | JSE Skikda | Salle Hacène Harcha, Algiers |
| 2009–10 | GS Pétroliers | 38 – 22 | CR Bordj Bou Arréridj | Salle Hacène Harcha, Algiers |
| 2010–11 | GS Pétroliers | 36 – 23 | HBC El Biar | La Coupole, Algiers |
| 2011–12 | GS Pétroliers | 31 – 27 | JSE Skikda | Sports Palace, Oran |
| 2012–13 | GS Pétroliers | 31 – 27 | C Chelghoum Laïd | Salle Hacène Harcha, Algiers |
| 2013–14 | GS Pétroliers | 37 – 32 (a.e.t.) | ES Aïn Touta | Salle Hacène Harcha, Algiers |
| 2014–15 | CRB Baraki | 25 – 20 | CR Bordj Bou Arréridj | Salle Hacène Harcha, Algiers |
| 2015–16 | MC Saïda | 22 – 21 (a.e.t.) | CRB Baraki | Salle Hacène Harcha, Algiers |
| 2016–17 | GS Pétroliers | 28 – 21 | ES Aïn Touta | Salle Belakhdar Tahar, Algiers |
| 2017–18 | ES Aïn Touta | 24 – 22 | CR Bordj Bou Arréridj | Salle Hacène Harcha, Algiers |
| 2018–19 | GS Pétroliers | 23 – 22 | JSE Skikda | La Coupole, Algiers |
| 2019–20 | JSE Skikda | 22 – 21 (a.e.t.) | ES Aïn Touta | La Coupole, Algiers |
| 2020–21 | Not played | | | |
| 2021–22 | MC Alger | 32 – 28 (a.e.t.) | ES Aïn Touta | Salle Hacène Harcha, Algiers |
| 2022–23 | OM Annaba | 38 – 34 (a.e.t.)x2 | HBC El Biar | Miloud Hadefi Complex Arena, Oran |
| 2023–24 | M Bordj Bou Arréridj | 24 – 23 | JSE Skikda | Salle Hacène Harcha, Algiers |
| 2024–25 | O El Oued | 17 – 16 | HBC El Biar | Salle Hacène Harcha, Algiers |
| 2025–26 | | – | | |

- Rq:

MC Alger: ex. MP Alger & GS Pétroliers
OC Alger: ex. CS DNC Alger, JSB Alger & IRB/ERC Alger
RC Kouba: ex. CSS Kouba & NAR Alger
MC Oran: ex. MP Oran
CR Belouizdad: ex. CR Belcourt
Hamra Annaba: ex. USM Annaba

== Performance by club ==
| Rank | Club | Winner | Runners-up | Winning years |
|---|---|---|---|---|
| 1 | MC Alger | 30 | 2 | 1982, 1983, 1987, 1989, 1990, 1991, 1993, 1994, 1995, 1997, 1998, 1999, 2000, 2001, 2002, 2003, 2004, 2005, 2006, 2007, 2008, 2009, 2010, 2011, 2012, 2013, 2014, 2017, 2019, 2022 |
| 2 | Nadit Alger | 6 | 3 | 1972, 1973, 1976, 1979, 1980, 1985 |
| 3 | OC Alger | 5 | 9 | 1975, 1977, 1981, 1988, 1996 |
| 4 | MC Oran | 2 | 6 | 1984, 1986 |
| 5 | GCS Alger | 2 | 0 | 1969, 1970 |
| 5 | RC Kouba | 2 | 0 | 1971, 1974 |
| 7 | JSE Skikda | 1 | 5 | 2020 |
| 8 | ES Aïn Touta | 1 | 4 | 2018 |
| 9 | CRB Baraki | 1 | 2 | 2015 |
| 9 | MC Saïda | 1 | 2 | 2016 |
| 11 | Hamra Annaba | 1 | 1 | 1968 |
| 12 | CR Belcourt | 1 | 0 | 1967 |
| 12 | OM Annaba | 1 | 0 | 2023 |
| 12 | M Bordj Bou Arréridj | 1 | 0 | 2024 |
| 12 | O El Oued | 1 | 0 | 2025 |

== See also ==
- Algerian Handball Championship
