= African Women's Handball Super Cup =

- Founded: 1994
- Country: Africa
- Confederation: CAHB members
- Most recent champion: (Angola) Petro Atlético (20 titles)
- Most titles: (Angola) Petro Atlético (20 titles)
- 2026 African Handball Super Cup

The African Women's Handball Super Cup or Super Cup Babacar Fall is an annual international club handball competition run by the African Handball Confederation. It's between the winners of the Champions League and the Cup Winners' Cup.

The competition has been renamed so as to honour CAHB first chairman, the Senegalese Babacar Fall.

== Finals ==
Year	Host	Final					
Year	Host	Champion	Score	Runner-up			
1994; Details	(Senegal) Dakar	(Angola); Petro Atlético	20–17	(Ivory Coast); Africa Sports			
1995; Details	(Republic of the Congo) Brazzaville	(Republic of the Congo); Étoile du Congo	–	(Angola); Petro Atlético			
1996; Details	(Algeria) Algiers	(Angola); Petro Atlético	25–24 (a.e.t.)	(Ivory Coast); Africa Sports			
1997; Details	(Nigeria) Kano	(Ivory Coast); Africa Sports	22–21	(Algeria); MC Alger			
1998; Details	(Niger) Niamey	(Angola); Petro Atlético	35–30	(Ivory Coast); Africa Sports			
1999; Details	(Benin) Cotonou	(Angola); Petro Atlético	27–21	(Ivory Coast); Africa Sports			
2000; Details	(Benin) Cotonou	(Angola); Petro Atlético	–	(Algeria); MC Alger			
2001; Details	(Nigeria) Benin City	(Angola); Petro Atlético	28–24	(Ivory Coast); Africa Sports			
2002; Details	(Gabon) Libreville	(Angola); Petro Atlético	Walkover	(Ivory Coast); Africa Sports			
2003; Details	(Benin) Cotonou	(Angola); Petro Atlético	30–27	(Ivory Coast); Rombo Sport			
2004	—	Postponed					
2005; Details	(Angola) Luanda	(Angola); Petro Atlético	28–24	(Ivory Coast); Rombo Sport			
2005; Details	(Ivory Coast) Abidjan	(Angola); Petro Atlético	26–28	(Ivory Coast); Rombo Sport			
2006; Details	(Ivory Coast) Abidjan	(Angola); Petro Atlético	25–26	(Ivory Coast); Rombo Sport			
2006; Details	(Angola) Luanda	(Angola); Petro Atlético	28–22	(Ivory Coast); Rombo Sport			
2007; Details	(Angola) Luanda	(Angola); Petro Atlético	38–28	(Ivory Coast); Rombo Sport			
2007; Details	(Ivory Coast) Abidjan	(Angola); Petro Atlético	22–26	(Ivory Coast); Rombo Sport			
2008; Details	(Benin) Cotonou	(Angola); Petro Atlético	–	(Republic of the Congo); Inter Club			
2009; Details	(Benin) Cotonou	(Angola); Petro Atlético	33–26	(Cameroon); Tonerre Yaoundé			
2010; Details	(Burkina Faso) Ouagadougou	(Angola); Petro Atlético	27–18	(Algeria); GS Pétroliers			
2011; Details	(Cameroon) Yaounde	(Angola); Petro Atlético	33–25	(Cameroon); FAP Yaoundé			
2012; Details	(Tunisia) Hammamet	(Angola); Petro Atlético	25–14	(Cameroon); FAP Yaoundé			
2013; Details	(Tunisia) Hammamet	(Angola); Petro Atlético	30–16	(Tunisia); ES Rejiche			
2014; Details	(Republic of the Congo) Oyo	(Angola); Petro Atlético	33–26	(Republic of the Congo); Inter Club			
2015; Details	(Gabon) Libreville	(Angola); Primeiro de Agosto	32–28	(Angola); Petro Atlético			
2016; Details	(Western Sahara) Laayoune	(Angola); Primeiro de Agosto	33–14	(Ivory Coast); Africa Sports			
2017; Details	(Morocco) Agadir	(Angola); Primeiro de Agosto	26–17	(Republic of the Congo); CARA Brazzaville			
2018; Details	(Egypt) Cairo	(Angola); Primeiro de Agosto	26–23	(Cameroon); FAP Yaoundé			
2019; Details	(Morocco) Oujda	(Angola); Primeiro de Agosto	19–13	(Angola); Petro Atlético			
2020	(Angola) Luanda	Cancelled due to the COVID-19 pandemic					
2021; Details	(Angola) Luanda	(Angola); Primeiro de Agosto	25–24	(Angola); Petro Atlético			
2022	—	Cancelled					
2023; Details	(Angola) Luanda	(Angola); Petro Atlético	29–26	(Angola); Primeiro de Agosto			
Year	Host	Final			Third place match		
Year	Host	Champion	Score	Runner-up	Third place	Score	Fourth place
2024; Details	(Algeria) Oran	(Angola); Primeiro de Agosto	31–28	(Angola); Petro Atlético	(Egypt); Al Ahly	29–20	(Republic of the Congo); DGSP
2025; Details	(Egypt) Cairo	(Angola); Petro Atlético	25–14	(Egypt); Al Ahly	(Tunisia); ASF Sahel	30–21	(Republic of the Congo); AS Otohô
2026; Details	(Democratic Republic of the Congo) Kinshasa		–			–	

== Winners by club ==
As of May 2025

#	Clubs	Winners	Runners-up	Total Finals
1	(Angola) Petro Atlético	20	5	25
2	(Angola) Primeiro de Agosto	7	1	8
3	(Ivory Coast) Africa Sports	1	4	5
4	(Republic of the Congo) Étoile du Congo	1	0	1
5	(Ivory Coast) Rombo Sport	0	4	4
6	(Cameroon) FAP Yaoundé	0	3	3
7	(Algeria) MC Alger	0	2	2
7	(Republic of the Congo) Inter Club	0	2	2
9	(Cameroon) TKC Yaoundé	0	1	1
9	(Republic of the Congo) CARA Brazzaville	0	1	1
9	(Egypt) Al Ahly	0	1	1
9	(Tunisia) ES Rejiche	0	1	1

- Rq:

GS Pétroliers (ex. MC Alger HB)

== Winners by country ==
As of May 2025

#	Nation	Winners	Runners-up	Total Finals
1	Angola	27	6	33
2	Ivory Coast	1	8	9
3	(Republic of the Congo) Congo	1	3	4
4	Cameroon	0	4	4
5	Algeria	0	2	2
6	Egypt	0	1	1
6	Tunisia	0	1	1

== See also ==
- African Women's Handball Champions League
- African Women's Handball Cup Winners' Cup
