= 2018 African Women's Handball Cup Winners' Cup =

Tournament details
- Host country: Egypt
- Venue: 1 (in 1 host city)
- Dates: April 13–22
- Teams: 7 (from 1 confederation)

Final positions
- Champions: (Angola) Petro Atlético (8th title)
- Runners-up: (Angola) 1º de Agosto
- Third place: (Cameroon) FAP Yaoundé
- Fourth place: (Republic of the Congo) Abo Sport

Tournament statistics
- Matches played: 28
- Goals scored: 1,378 (49.21 per match)

The 2018 African Women's Handball Cup Winners' Cup was the 34th edition, organized by the African Handball Confederation, under the auspices of the International Handball Federation, the handball sport governing body. The tournament was held from April 13–22, 2018 in one venue: the Salle Omnisport Al Inbiâat, in Cairo, Egypt, contested by 9 teams and won by Petro Atlético of Angola.

== Draw ==
Group A	Group B
(Egypt) Al Ahly (Republic of the Congo) CARA Brazzaville (Cameroon) Dynamique (Democratic Republic of the Congo) HC Héritage (Angola) Primeiro de Agosto	(Republic of the Congo) Abo Sport (Cameroon) FAP Yaoundé (Ivory Coast) Habitat (Angola) Petro Atlético

== Preliminary rounds ==
Times given below are in EET (UTC+2).

=== Group A ===
Fri/Sun, 13/16 Apr 2018
19:30	Dynamique (Cameroon)	25 (11:09) 20	(Egypt) Al Ahly
09:30	CARA Brazzaville (Republic of the Congo)	26 (11:12) 26	(Democratic Republic of the Congo) HC Héritage
Sat, 14 Apr 2018
15:00	1º de Agosto (Angola)	27 (12:06) 13	(Cameroon) Dynamique
17:00	HC Héritage (Democratic Republic of the Congo)	23 (09:10) 22	(Egypt) Al Ahly
Sun, 15 Apr 2018
11:00	Dynamique (Cameroon)	25 (12:15) 25	(Republic of the Congo) CARA Brazzaville
17:00	Al Ahly (Egypt)	15 (06:17) 31	(Angola) 1º de Agosto
Tue, 17 Apr 2018
13:00	HC Héritage (Democratic Republic of the Congo)	27 (16:14) 24	(Cameroon) Dynamique
19:00	1º de Agosto (Angola)	31 (15:10) 14	(Republic of the Congo) CARA Brazzaville
Wed, 18 Apr 2018
17:00	CARA Brazzaville (Republic of the Congo)	15 (08:18) 29	(Egypt) Al Ahly
17:00	HC Héritage (Democratic Republic of the Congo)	16 (10:18) 35	(Angola) 1º de Agosto

Team	Pld	W	D	L	GF	GA	GDIF	Pts
(Angola) 1º de Agosto	4	4	0	0	124	58	+66	8
(Democratic Republic of the Congo) HC Héritage	4	2	1	1	92	107	-15	5
(Republic of the Congo) CARA Brazzaville	4	1	2	1	80	111	-31	4
(Egypt) Al Ahly	4	1	0	3	86	94	-8	2
(Cameroon) Dynamique	4	1	0	3	87	99	-12	2

* Note: Advance to quarter-finals

=== Group B ===
Sat, 14 Apr 2018
13:30	Petro Atlético (Angola)	30 (15:07) 15	(Ivory Coast) Habitat
17:00	Abo Sport (Republic of the Congo)	23 (16:11) 25	(Cameroon) FAP Yaoundé
Sun/Mon, 15/16 Apr 2018
13:00	FAP Yaoundé (Cameroon)	17 (07:13) 30	(Angola) Petro Atlético
09:30	Abo Sport (Republic of the Congo)	38 (07:16) 28	(Ivory Coast) Habitat
Tue/Wed, 17/18 Apr 2018
11:00	Habitat (Ivory Coast)	25 (14:14) 30	(Cameroon) FAP Yaoundé
15:00	Petro Atlético (Angola)	36 (20:13) 24	(Republic of the Congo) Abo Sport

Team	Pld	W	D	L	GF	GA	GDIF	Pts
(Angola) Petro Atlético	3	3	0	0	96	56	+40	6
(Cameroon) FAP Yaoundé	3	2	0	1	72	78	-6	4
(Republic of the Congo) Abo Sport	3	2	0	1	85	89	-3	2
(Ivory Coast) Habitat	3	0	0	3	68	98	-30	0

* Note: Advance to quarter-finals

== Knockout stage ==
Championship bracket

Quarter-finals
Thu 19 Apr 2018 – 13:00
(Angola) Petro Atlético	27
(Egypt) Al Ahly	17
Thu 19 Apr 2018 – 15:00
(Republic of the Congo) Abo Sport	25
(Democratic Republic of the Congo) HC Héritage	21
Thu 19 Apr 2018 – 17:00
(Angola) 1º de Agosto	33
(Ivory Coast) Habitat	12
Thu 19 Apr 2018 – 19:00
(Cameroon) Dynamique	18
(Cameroon) FAP Yaoundé	22

Semi-finals
Sat 21 Apr 2018 – 15:00
(Angola) Petro Atlético	31
(Republic of the Congo) Abo Sport	18
Sat 21 Apr 2018 – 19:00
(Angola) 1º de Agosto	26
(Cameroon) FAP Yaoundé	17

Final
Sun 22 Apr 2018 – 18:00
(Angola) Petro Atlético	23
(Angola) 1º de Agosto	19
Third place
Sun 22 Apr 2018 – 13:00
(Republic of the Congo) Abo Sport	21
(Cameroon) FAP Yaoundé	28

5-8th bracket

5th-8th place
Sat 21 Apr 2018 – 13:00
(Ivory Coast) Habitat	20
(Cameroon) Dynamique	28
Sat 21 Apr 2018 – 17:00
(Egypt) Al Ahly	25
(Democratic Republic of the Congo) HC Héritage	29

Fifth place
Sun 22 Apr 2018 – 11:00
(Democratic Republic of the Congo) HC Héritage	28
(Cameroon) Dynamique	25
Seventh place
Sun 22 Apr 2018 – 09:00
(Egypt) Al Ahly	42
(Ivory Coast) Habitat	33

== Final standings ==
Rank	Team	Record
Gold medal	(Angola) Petro Atlético	6–0
Silver medal	(Angola) 1º de Agosto	6–1
Bronze medal	(Cameroon) FAP Yaoundé	4–2
4	(Republic of the Congo) Abo Sport	3–3
5	(Democratic Republic of the Congo) HC Héritage	4–2
6	(Cameroon) Dynamique	2–5
7	(Egypt) Al Ahly	2–5
8	(Ivory Coast) Habitat HBC	0–6
9	(Republic of the Congo) CARA Brazzaville	1–1

2018 African Women's Handball Cup Winners' Cup Winner

Atlético Petróleos de Luanda
8th title

== See also ==
2018 African Women's Handball Champions League
