= MC Oran (handball) =

- Full name: Mouloudia Club d'Oran (handball)
- Founded: 1977 (Omnisports club: 1 January 1917)
- Arena: Palais des Sports Hamou Boutlélis, Oran, Algeria
- Capacity: 5,000
- Head coach: Chahreddine Mazari
- League: Algerian Handball Championship
- D2 2023-24: 1st place
- Club colours
Home	Away

Mouloudia Club d'Oran (handball) (Arabic: نادي مولودية وهران لكرة اليد), referred to as MC Oran HB for a short, is an Algerian handball team based in Oran, that plays in the Algerian Handball Championship.

== Honours ==
=== National titles ===
- Algerian Handball Championship

Champion (2): 1983, 1992

- Algerian Handball Cup

Champion (2): 1984, 1986
Runners-up (6): 1979, 1982, 1985, 1988, 1989, 1999

=== International titles ===
- African Handball Cup Winners' Cup

Champion (1): 1987
Runner-up (1): 1988

- Arab Club Handball Championship

Champion (3): 1983, 1984, 1988
Runner-up (1): 1994
Third place (1): 1985

- Arab Handball Championship of Winners' Cup

Fourth place (1): 1999

=== Women's section ===
==== Algerian Women's Handball Cup ====
Champion (1): 1987

== Notable players ==
- (Algeria) Abdelkrim Bendjemil
- (Algeria) Abdeslam Benmaghsoula
- (Algeria) Chemseddine Bensenouci
- (Algeria) Houari Besbes
- (Algeria) Nacereddine Bessedjerari
- (Algeria) Abdeldjalil Bouanani
- (Algeria) Mohamed Bouziane
- (Algeria) Djamel Doballah
- (Algeria) Mustapha Doballah
- (Algeria) Sofiane Elimam
- (Algeria) Jamel Harrat
- (Algeria) Ali Houd
- (Algeria) Bouâa Mekhloufi
- (Algeria) Salim Nedjel
- (Algeria) Nourreddine Hamdoune
