= Morten Soubak =

Danish handball player and coach (born 1964)

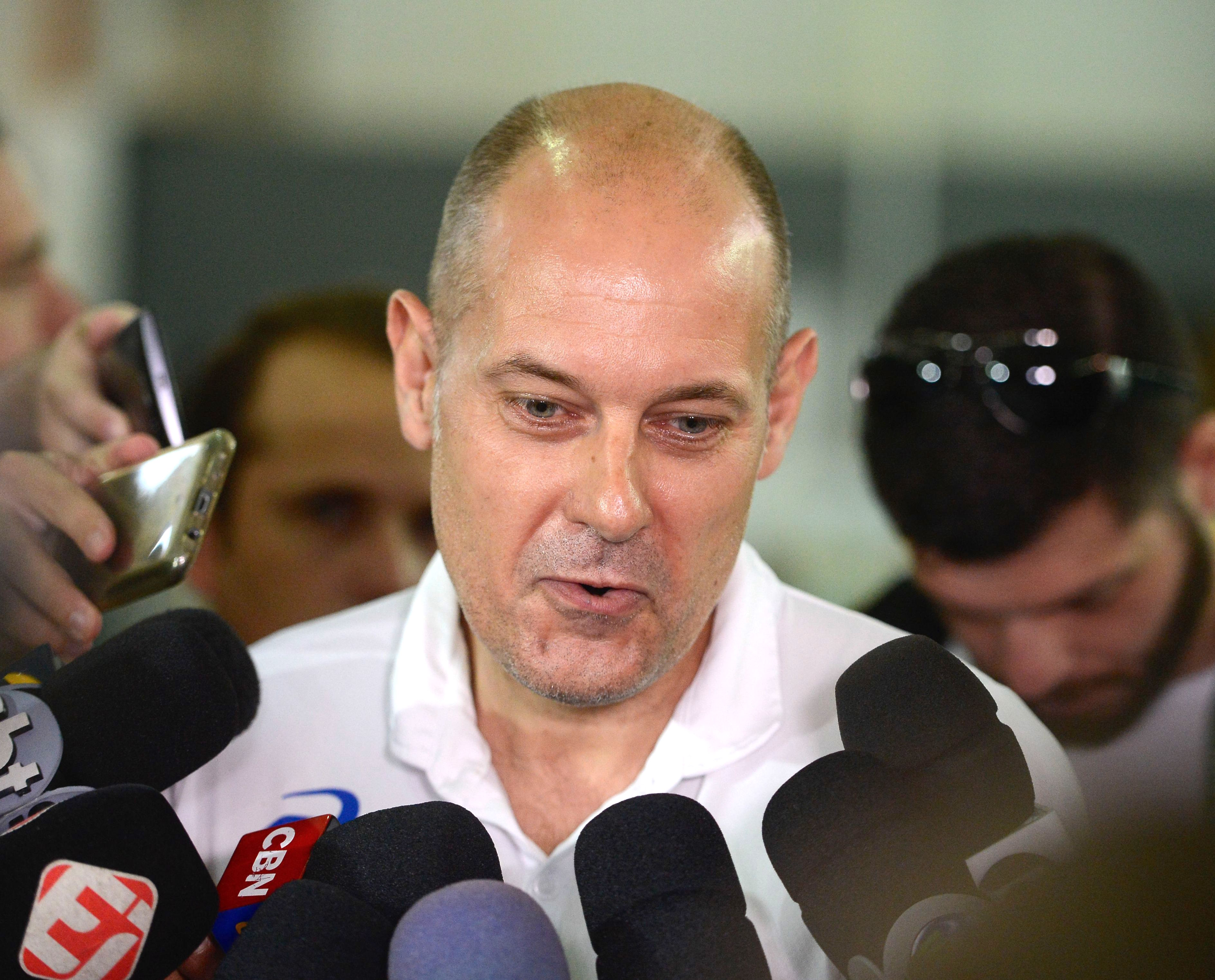
- Soubak in 2016.
- Born: August 6, 1964 (age 61); Copenhagen, Denmark
- Occupation: Handball coach
- Known for: Head coach of the Brazil women's national handball team (2009–2016)

Morten Soubak (born 6 August 1964) is a Danish handball coach for Primeiro de Agosto and the Angola women's national team. He coached the Brazilian national team between 2009 and 2016 and lead them to a historic title at the 2013 World Women's Handball Championship.

== Biography ==
Soubak hails from Fodby, a small village west of Næstved. During his childhood, he became a fan of both association football, particularly the Brazilian team and its star Pelé, and handball, a sport he took up playing. In college, he studied to coach both sports, and soon after graduating, Soubak begun coaching child and junior teams simultaneously to volunteer work for the Red Cross. Denmark had received many refugees of the Yugoslav wars, and Soubak organized sports activities for the expatriates, while also providing language classes and directing them to local clubs. His first coaching job happened in 1994 for Virum-Sorgenfri.

As a Danish female team had recently visited Brazil, in 1993 Soubak decided to visit the South American country in search of local contacts, despite not knowing neither Portuguese nor even Spanish. This came to help him in 1995, as Soubak worked in the junior teams of FCK Håndbold and met a Brazilian coach (Eduardo Henrique de Macedo) who was studying the Danish handball. Said coach brought Soubak to manage a team in Osasco, but the Dane only remained there for six months dissatisfied with the lack of infrastructure and resources. Upon his return to Denmark, Soubak coached both Virum-Sorgenfri and GOG without much success. Afterwards Soubak earned national recognition as a handball commenter for TV2, between 2000 and 2005. In the meantime, he coached the women's teams of GOG and FCK - the latter featuring Brazilian goalkeeper Chana Masson - and the Denmark men's national youth handball team.

Eventually Soubak returned to Brazil in 2005 to coach the male team of Esporte Clube Pinheiros. Winning many titles in three years, Soubak attracted the interest of the Brazilian Handball Confederation (CBHB), who invited him to manage the women's national team. Since taking over the team in 2009, Soubak lead the Brazilians to their most successful period, winning both the 2013 World Women's Handball Championship and the 2011 Pan American Games, and reaching the quarterfinals of the 2011 World Championship and the 2012 Olympics. Between 2013 and 2014, Soubak lived in Austria to coach Hypo Niederösterreich, which hosted many of the players of his Brazilian national team due to a partnership with CBHB. Soubak is married to a Brazilian woman, with whom he has a daughter.

In 2017, Soubak signed a one-year deal with Angolan women's club Primeiro de Agosto.
