= Iracelma Silva =

Angolan handball player

Personal information
- Full name: Iracelma Patrícia da Silva
- Nationality: Angolan
- Born: 1 February 1991 (age 35) Luanda, Angola
- Height: 1.80 m (5 ft 11 in)

Sport
- Sport: Handball
- Position: Right wing
- Current club: Primeiro de Agosto
- Number: 3
National team
Years	Team	Apps	(Gls)
–	Angola	89	(27)

Iracelma Patrícia da Silva (born 1 February 1991) is an Angolan handball player for Primeiro de Agosto and the Angolan national team.

She represented Angola at the 2013 World Women's Handball Championship in Serbia.

== Achievements ==
- Carpathian Trophy:
  - Winner: 2019
