= Algerian Handball Championship =

Algerian premier professional handball league

Division Excellence
- Founded: 1962
- No. of teams: 18
- Country: Algeria
- Confederation: CAHB
- Most recent champion: O El Oued (2024–25)
- Most titles: MC Alger (28 titles)
- Level on pyramid: Excellence (1)
- Relegation to: Division Excellence B
- International cups: Champions League; Cup Winners' Cup
- Website: http://handbalgerie.tripod.com
- 2025-26 Algerian Handball Championship

The Algerian Handball Championship or the Division Excellence is the premier professional handball league in Algeria. It started in 1962 and 14 teams participate in the league.

== History ==
The Algerian handball championship existed at the time of French colonization and was therefore affiliated with the French Handball Federation.

From 1954 to 1959, there was a championship according to the regions. In 1960, regional championships were created played by clubs, the winners of each region being qualified for the final tournament, the winner of which was declared champion of Algeria. The winners of the 1960 edition was Spartiates Oran.

=== Departemental Championship (colonial period) ===
Season	Champion	Score	Runner-up
1954	Oran	30–20	Algiers
1955	not held		
1956	Oran	21–20	Algiers
1957	Algiers	13–12	Oran
1958	Oran	27–18	Algiers
1959	Oran	14–12	Algiers

=== Algerian Championship (colonial period) ===
Season	Champion	Runner-up
1960	Spartiates Oran	FC Blida

details

Regional championships

Season	Region	Champion
1960	Oran	Spartiates Oran
1960	Algiers	HC Aïn Touta
1960	Constantine	SOC Philippeville

Playoff

Tournament played in Leclerc Stadium in Algiers.

Round	Team 1	Score	Team 2	
1960	Semi-finals	Spartiates Oran	17–16	HC Aïn Touta
1960	Semi-finals	FC Blida	bt	SOC Philippeville
1960	Final	Spartiates Oran	24–10	FC Blida

== Champions ==
Season	Champion	Runner-up
1962–63	Spartiates Oran	
1963–64	Spartiates Oran	
1964–65	MC Saïda	
1965–66	JSM Skikda	
1966–67	MC Saïda	
1967–68	USM Annaba	
1968–69	CR Belcourt	
1969–70	CSS Kouba	
1970–71	CSS Kouba	
1971–72	NAR Alger	
1972–73	Nadit Alger	
1973–74	Nadit Alger	
1974–75	Nadit Alger	CS DNC Alger
1975–76	CS DNC Alger	Nadit Alger
1976–77	CS DNC Alger	Nadit Alger
1977–78	Nadit Alger	CS DNC Alger
1978–79	CS DNC Alger	Nadit Alger
1979–80	CS DNC Alger	
1980–81	Nadit Alger	
1981–82	MP Alger	
1982–83	MP Oran	
1983–84	MP Alger	

Season	Champion	Runner-up
1984–85	Nadit Alger	
1985–86	IRB Alger	
1986–87	MP Alger	IRB Alger
1987–88	MC Alger	
1988–89	MC Alger	
1989–90	ERC Alger	MC Alger
1990–91	MC Alger	
1991–92	MC Oran	
1992–93	MC Alger	
1993–94	MC Alger	
1994–95	MC Alger	
1995–96	IRB Alger	
1996–97	MC Alger	
1997–98	MC Alger	
1998–99	MC Alger	
1999–00	MC Alger	
2000–01	MC Alger	
2001–02	MC Alger	
2002–03	MC Alger	
2003–04	US Biskra	
2004–05	MC Alger	JSE Skikda
2005–06	MC Alger	WA Rouiba

Season	Champion	Runner-up
2006–07	MC Alger	MC Saïda
2007–08	MC Alger	JSE Skikda
2008–09	GS Pétroliers	HBC El Biar
2009–10	GS Pétroliers	
2010–11	GS Pétroliers	
2011–12*	JSE Skikda	
2012–13	GS Pétroliers	CRB Baraki
2013–14	GS Pétroliers	CRB Baraki
2014–15	JSE Skikda	CRB Baraki
2015–16	GS Pétroliers	CR Bordj Bou Arréridj
2016–17	GS Pétroliers	
2017–18	GS Pétroliers	CR Bordj Bou Arréridj
2018–19	CR Bordj Bou Arréridj	ES Aïn Touta
2019–20*	JSE Skikda	JS Saoura
2020–21	Cancelled due to the COVID-19 pandemic in Algeria	
2021–22	ES Aïn Touta	CRB Baraki
2022–23	ES Aïn Touta	JSE Skikda
2023–24	M Bordj Bou Arréridj	O El Oued
2024–25	O El Oued	HBC El Biar
2025–26		

- Notes:

* The 2011-2012 season was canceled by the Algerian Court of Sports Disputes
* The 2019-2020 season was being cantinued in 2021
MC Alger : ex. MP Alger & GS Pétroliers
OC Alger: ex. CS DNC Alger & IRB Alger
RC Kouba: ex. CSS Kouba & NAR Alger
MC Oran: ex. MP Oran
CR Belouizdad: ex. CR Belcourt
Hamra Annaba: ex. USM Annaba

== Most successful clubs ==
Rank	Club	Champion	Runners-up	Winning years
1	MC Alger	28		1982, 1984, 1987, 1988, 1989, 1991, 1993, 1994, 1995, 1997, 1998, 1999, 2000, 2001, 2002, 2003, 2005, 2006, 2007, 2008, 2009, 2010, 2011, 2013, 2014, 2016, 2017, 2018
2	OC Alger	7		1976, 1977, 1979, 1980, 1986, 1990, 1996
3	Nadit Alger	6		1973, 1974, 1975, 1978, 1981, 1985
4	RC Kouba	3		1970, 1971, 1972
5	Spartiates Oran	2		1963, 1964
5	MC Saïda	2		1965, 1967
5	MC Oran	2		1983, 1992
5	JSE Skikda	2		2015, 2020
5	ES Aïn Touta	2		2022, 2023
9	JSM Skikda	1		1966
9	Hamra Annaba	1		1968
9	CR Belcourt	1		1969
9	US Biskra	1		2004
9	CR Bordj Bou Arréridj	1		2019
9	M Bordj Bou Arréridj	1		2024
9	O El Oued	1		2025

== Current teams ==
These are the teams that participate in the 2021–22 Algerian Handball Championship season: Nine clubs promoted from the second division.

Promoted from National 1

Team	Home city	Arena	Capacity
AB Barika	Barika	Salle OMS de Barika	1.332
Chabab Chelghoum Laïd	Chelghoum Laïd		
CRB Baraki	Baraki	Salle Mahdi Boualem de Benghazi	2.000
CRBEE Alger Centre	Algiers		
CRB Mila	Mila	Salle Omnisports Tayeb Ben Abderrahmane	
CR Bordj Bou Arréridj	Bordj Bou Arréridj		
CR El Arrouche	El Arrouche, Skikda		
CS Bir Mourad Raïs	Bir Mourad Raïs		
ES Aïn Touta	Aïn Touta	Salle OMS Aïn Touta	1.000
ES Arzew	Arzew	Salle Omnisports d'Arzew	2.500
HBC El Biar	El Biar	Salle Omnisports Mokhtar Arribi	2.000
IC Ouargla	Ouargla	Salle Omnisports de Rouissat	
IR Bouteldja	Bouteldja	Salle Omnisports d'El Tarf	
JSE Skikda	Skikda	Salle des Frères Bouchache	250
JS Kabylie	Tizi Ouzou	Salle OMS de l'OPOW du 1er Novembre	
JS Saoura	Béchar	Salle OPOW de Béchar	500
MB Tadjenanet	Tadjenanet	Salle OMS de Tadjenanet	500
MC Alger	Algiers	Salle Hacène Harcha	8.000
MC Oran	Oran	Hamou Boutlélis Sports Palace	5.000
MC Oued Tlélat	Oued Tlélat	Salle Omnisports de Oued Tlélat	1.000
MC Saïda	Saïda	Salle Mustapha Boukada	
MM Batna	Batna	Salle OMS de l'OPOW du 1er Novembre	
Olympique El Oued	El Oued	Salle Omnisports Echatt	
Olympique Maghnia	Maghnia	Salle OMS de Maghnia	
OM Annaba	Annaba	Salle Omnisports Pont Blanc	

== See also ==
- Algerian Handball Cup
