= Helena Sousa =

Angolan handball player

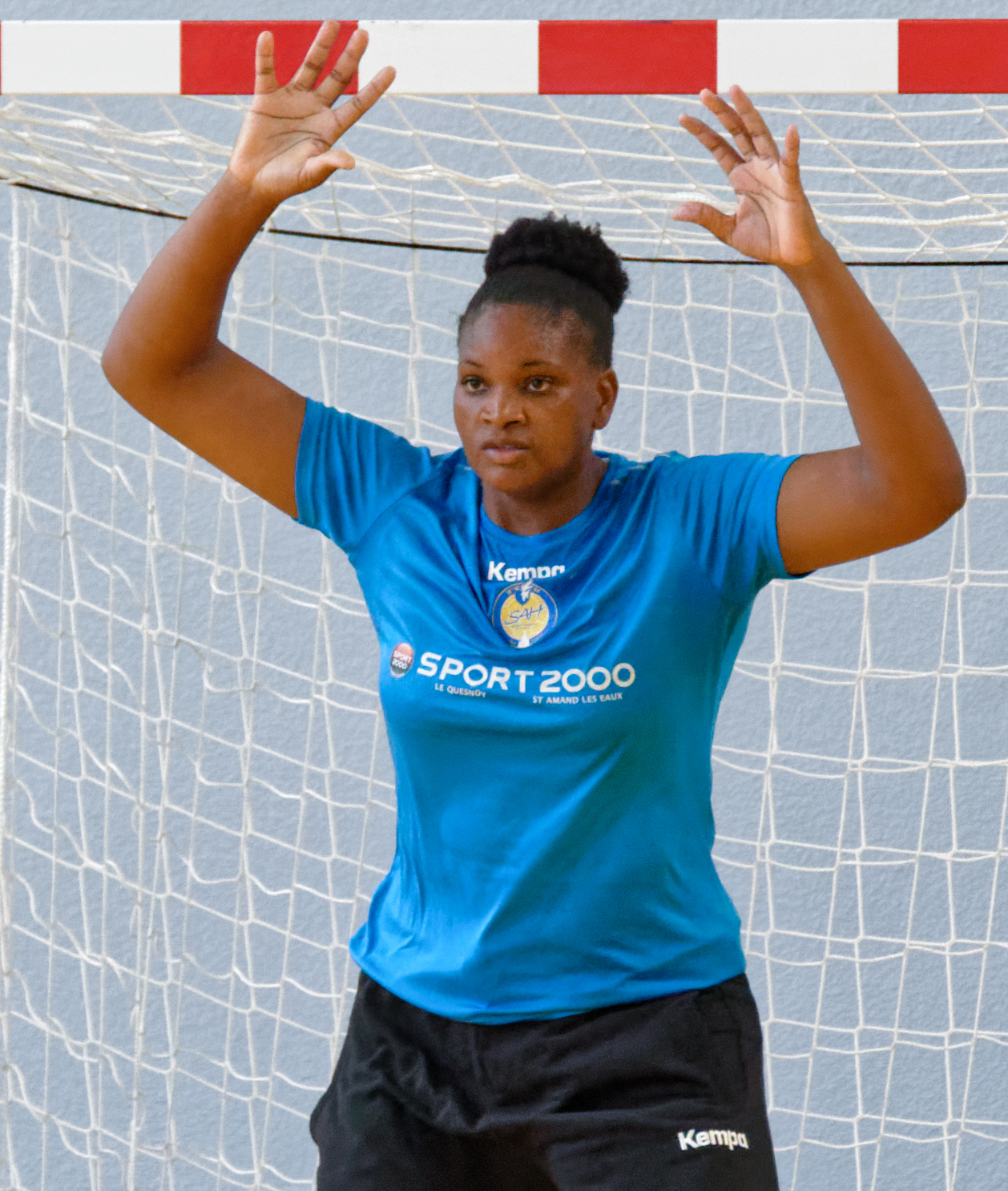

Personal information
- Full name: Helena Chidi Cawela Sousa
- Nationality: Angolan
- Born: 7 November 1994 (age 31) Luanda, Angola
- Height: 1.90 m (6 ft 3 in)

Sport
- Sport: Handball
- Position: Goalkeeper
- Current club: Saint-Amand Handball
- Number: 16
National team
Years	Team	Apps	(Gls)
–	Angola	33	(0)
Medal record
African Championship
Gold medal – first place	2018 Brazzaville
Gold medal – first place	2022 Dakar

Helena Chidi Cawela Sousa (born 7 November 1994) is an Angolan handball player for Saint-Amand Handball and the Angolan national team.

In 2019, she represented Angola at the 2019 African Games and at the 2019 World Women's Handball Championship.

== Achievements ==
- Carpathian Trophy:
  - Winner: 2019
