= Vilma Silva =

Angolan national handball player

Vilma da Silva
Personal information
- Full name: Vilma Chissola Ebo da Silva
- Nationality: Angolan
- Born: 3 June 1997 (age 29)
- Height: 1.75 m (5 ft 9 in)

Sport
- Sport: Handball
- Position: Left wing
- Current club: Primeiro de Agosto
- Number: 10
National team
Years	Team	Apps	(Gls)
–	Angola	19	(50)

Vilma Chissola Ebo da Silva (born 3 June 1997) is an Angolan handball player for Primeiro de Agosto and the Angolan national team.

She represented Angola at the 2017 World Women's Handball Championship.

== Achievements ==
- Carpathian Trophy:
  - Winner: 2019
