= Janete Santos =

Angolan handball player

Janete dos Santos
Personal information
- Full name: Janete Viegas dos Santos
- Nationality: Angolan
- Born: 10 June 1991 (age 35) Luanda, Angola
- Height: 1.77 m (5 ft 10 in)

Sport
- Sport: Handball
- Position: Left wing
- Current club: Primeiro de Agosto
- Number: 31
National team
Years	Team	Apps	(Gls)
–	Angola	43	(47)
Medal record
African Championship
Gold medal – first place	2016 Luanda
Gold medal – first place	2018 Brazzaville
African Games
Gold medal – first place	Brazzaville 2015	Team

Janete dos Santos (born 10 June 1991) is an Angolan handball player for Primeiro de Agosto and the Angolan national team.

She participated at the 2015 World Women's Handball Championship and at the 2016 Summer Olympics.
