= MC Alger (handball) =

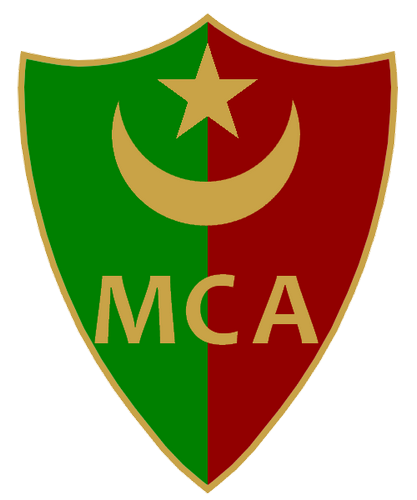
- Full name: Mouloudia Club d'Alger
- Short name: MCA
- Founded: 1964; 61 years ago, as Mouloudia Club d'Alger; 2008; 17 years ago, as GS Pétroliers
- Arena: Hacène Harcha Arena
- Capacity: 8,000
- President: Djaffar Bel Hocine
- Head coach: Reda Zeguili
- League: Algerian Handball Championship
- Club colours
Home	Away

Mouloudia Club d'Alger (Arabic: نادي مولودية الجزائر), referred to as MC Alger or MCA for short, is an Algerian handball team that was founded on 1964, it is also considered as the most titled handball club in Africa(90 titles), as a division of MC Alger. They play their home games in Hacène Harcha Arena, which has a capacity of 8,000 people.

== History ==
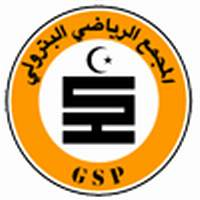
Logo of GS Pétroliers

From 2008 to 2020, the team was known as GS Pétroliers as it was part of the multi-sports club with that name.

The team's name changed back to MC Alger in 2020.

== Honours ==
=== National titles ===
- Algerian Handball Championship
  - Winners (28; record): 1982, 1984, 1987, 1988, 1989, 1991, 1992, 1994, 1995, 1997, 1998, 1999, 2000, 2001, 2002, 2003, 2005, 2006, 2007, 2008, 2009, 2010, 2011, 2013, 2014, 2016, 2017, 2018
- Algerian Handball Cup
  - Winners (30; record): 1982, 1983, 1987, 1989, 1990, 1991, 1993, 1994, 1995, 1997, 1998, 1999, 2000, 2001, 2002, 2003, 2004, 2005, 2006, 2007, 2008, 2009, 2010, 2011, 2012, 2013, 2014, 2017, 2019, 2022
- Algerian Handball Supercup
  - Winners (2; record): 2016, 2018

=== International titles (handball) ===
- African Handball Champions League
  - Winners (11): 1983, 1997, 1998, 1999, 2000, 2003, 2004, 2005, 2006, 2008, 2009
  - Runner-ups (2): 1985, 2010
- African Handball Cup Winners' Cup
  - Winners (9; record): 1988, 1991, 1992, 1993, 1994, 1995, 1997, 1998, 1999
  - Runner-up (3): 1989, 1990, 1996
- African Handball Super Cup
  - Winners (9; record): 1994, 1995, 1996, 1997, 1998, 1999, 2004, 2005, 2006
  - Runner-up (1): 2010
- Arab Club Handball Championship
  - Winners (2): 1989, 1991
  - Runner-up (1): 1993
- IHF Super Globe

Seventh Place : 1997
Third place : 2007

- Double

Winners (21): 1981–82, 1986–87, 1988–89, 1989–90, 1990–91, 1993–94, 1994–95, 1996–97, 1997–98, 1998–99, 1999–00, 2002–03, 2004–05, 2005–06, 2007–08, 2008–09, 2009–10, 2010–11, 2012–13, 2013–14, 2016–17

- Triple Crown

Winners (9): 1996–97, 1997–98, 1998–99, 1999–00, 2002–03, 2004–05, 2005–06, 2007–08, 2008–09
