= 2020–21 Zamalek SC (handball) =

52nd season in existence of Zamalek SC (handball)

Zamalek Handball Club
2020–21 season
- Head coach: (Egypt) Hussein Zaky
- Stadium: The Covered Hall (Abdulrahman Fawzi Hall)
Home colours	Away colours

The 2020–21 season is the 63rd season in the club history of the handball branch of Zamalek, the season began with Egyptian Handball League on the 28th of September 2020, as Zamalek competes for the Egyptian Handball League, Egypt Handball Cup.

== Current squad ==
=== Staff ===
Staff for the 2020–21 season.

Pos.	Name
Head coach	(Egypt) Hussein Zaky
Assistant coach	(Egypt) Hassan Yousry
Team manager	(Egypt) Hamada Abdelbary
Club doctor	(Egypt) Amr Ali
Physiotherapist	(Egypt) Ahmed Jamal
Masseur	(Egypt) Mustafa Al-Sunni

=== Team ===
Squad for the 2020–21 season.

Note: Flags indicate national team as defined under FIFA eligibility rules; some limited exceptions apply. Players may hold more than one non-FIFA nationality.

No.	Pos.	Nation	Player
12	GK	(Egypt) EGY	Hesham El-Sobky
72	GK	(Egypt) EGY	Mahmoud Khalil
3	LW	(Egypt) EGY	Mazen Reda
11	LW	(Egypt) EGY	Ahmed Moamen Safa
31	LW	(Egypt) EGY	Omar Al-Wakil
1	RW	(Egypt) EGY	Akram Yosri
55	RW	(Egypt) EGY	Hazem Mamdouh
4	LP	(Egypt) EGY	Mohamed Ramadan
24	LP	(Egypt) EGY	Khalid Waleed
25	LP	(Egypt) EGY	Wisam Nawar

No.	Pos.	Nation	Player
10	LB	(Egypt) EGY	Ali Hesham Nasr
39	LB	(Egypt) EGY	Yehia El-Deraa
42	LB	(Egypt) EGY	Hassan Walid
20	CB	(Egypt) EGY	Mohamed Alaa
9	RB	(Egypt) EGY	Mustafa Beshir
18	RB	(Egypt) EGY	Ahmed Hossam
8	LB	(Egypt) EGY	Mostafa khalil
66	RB	(Egypt) EGY	Ahmed El-Ahmar (C)

== Competitions ==
=== Overview ===
Competition	First match	Last match	Starting round	Final position	Record							
Competition	First match	Last match	Starting round	Final position	Pld	W	D	L	PF	PA	PD	Win %
League	28 September 2020	16 April 2021	Round 1	Winner	23	21	1	1	753	571	+182	91.30
Cup	30 March 2021	24 April 2021	R 1/16	Runner Up	4	3	0	1	90	68	+22	75.00
Total					27	24	1	2	843	639	+204	88.89

Source: Competitions

== Egyptian League ==
=== First Stage ===
Pos	Team	Pld	W	D	L	GF	GA	GD	Pts
1	Zamalek	8	8	0	0	289	192	+97	24

=== Matches ===
(Round 1)

Monday, 28 September 2020; 18:00 CET (UTC+1)	Zamalek SC	33–27	Smouha SC	Abdulrahman Fawzi Hall, Cairo
Monday, 28 September 2020; 18:00 CET (UTC+1)		(15–12)		Abdulrahman Fawzi Hall, Cairo

(Round 2)

Thursday, 8 October 2020; 16:00 CET (UTC+1)	Assiut Club	19–40	Zamalek SC	Assiut Hall, Assiut
Thursday, 8 October 2020; 16:00 CET (UTC+1)		(7–22)		Assiut Hall, Assiut

(Round 3)

Friday, 9 October 2020; 15:00 CET (UTC+1)	Assiut Petroleum Club	20–34	Zamalek SC	Assiut Hall, Assiut
Friday, 9 October 2020; 15:00 CET (UTC+1)		(11–18)		Assiut Hall, Assiut

(Round 4)

Thursday, 15 October 2020; 18:00 CET (UTC+1)	Zamalek SC	43–13	Aviation SC	Abdulrahman Fawzi Hall, Cairo
Thursday, 15 October 2020; 18:00 CET (UTC+1)		(20–7)		Abdulrahman Fawzi Hall, Cairo

(Round 5)

Friday, 16 October 2020; 18:00 CET (UTC+1)	Zamalek SC	33–29	Tala'ea El Gaish SC	Abdulrahman Fawzi Hall, Cairo
Friday, 16 October 2020; 18:00 CET (UTC+1)		(17–16)		Abdulrahman Fawzi Hall, Cairo

(Round 6)

Thursday, 19 November 2020; 20:00 CET (UTC+1)	Heliopolis	30–36	Zamalek SC	Heliopolis Hall, Cairo
Thursday, 19 November 2020; 20:00 CET (UTC+1)		(–)		Heliopolis Hall, Cairo

(Round 7)

Tuesday, 24 November 2020; 18:00 CET (UTC+1)	Gezira SC	31–38	Zamalek SC	Gezira Hall, Cairo
Tuesday, 24 November 2020; 18:00 CET (UTC+1)		(–)		Gezira Hall, Cairo

(Round 8)

Wednesday, 25 November 2020; 18:00 CET (UTC+1)	Zamalek SC	32–23	Hadayek Al Ahram Club	Abdulrahman Fawzi Hall, Cairo
Wednesday, 25 November 2020; 18:00 CET (UTC+1)		(–)		Abdulrahman Fawzi Hall, Cairo

=== Final stage ===
Pos	Team	Pld	W	D	L	GF	GA	GD	Pts
1	Zamalek	14	12	1	1	446	379	+67	39

- Note First Team Qualified for a play-off final match to determine the League champion, according to the regulations, after equal points.

=== Matches ===
(Round 1 )

Friday, 5 February 2021; 16:00 CET (UTC+1)	El Zohour SC	26–34	Zamalek SC	El Zohour Hall, Cairo
Friday, 5 February 2021; 16:00 CET (UTC+1)		(–)		El Zohour Hall, Cairo

(Round 2)

Thursday, 11 February 2021; 18:00 CET (UTC+1)	Zamalek SC	30-21	Olympic SC	Abdulrahman Fawzi Hall, Cairo
Thursday, 11 February 2021; 18:00 CET (UTC+1)		(–)		Abdulrahman Fawzi Hall, Cairo

(Round 3)

Friday, 12 February 2021; 18:00 CET (UTC+1)	Zamalek SC	24–30	Sporting SC	Abdulrahman Fawzi Hall, Cairo
Friday, 12 February 2021; 18:00 CET (UTC+1)		(–)		Abdulrahman Fawzi Hall, Cairo

(Round 4)

Thursday, 18 February 2021; 18:00 CET (UTC+1)	Al Ahly SC	27–28	Zamalek SC	6th of October Sports Hall, Cairo
Thursday, 18 February 2021; 18:00 CET (UTC+1)		(–)		6th of October Sports Hall, Cairo

(Round 5)

Friday, 19 February 2021; 18:00 CET (UTC+1)	Aviation SC	23–32	Zamalek SC	Aviation Club Hall, Cairo
Friday, 19 February 2021; 18:00 CET (UTC+1)		(–)		Aviation Club Hall, Cairo

(Round 6)

Thursday, 25 February 2021; 18:00 CET (UTC+1)	Heliopolis	26–36	Zamalek SC	Heliopolis Hall, Cairo
Thursday, 25 February 2021; 18:00 CET (UTC+1)		(–)		Heliopolis Hall, Cairo

(Round 7)

Friday, 26 February 2021; 18:00 CET (UTC+1)	Tala'ea El Gaish SC	25–29	Zamalek SC	Tallaa Elgish Hall, Cairo
Friday, 26 February 2021; 18:00 CET (UTC+1)		(–)		Tallaa Elgish Hall, Cairo

(Round 8)

Friday, 19 March 2021; 18:00 CET (UTC+1)	Zamalek SC	35–32	El Zohour SC	Abdulrahman Fawzi Hall, Cairo
Friday, 19 March 2021; 18:00 CET (UTC+1)		(–)		Abdulrahman Fawzi Hall, Cairo

(Round 9)

Thursday, 25 March 2021; 16:00 CET (UTC+1)	Olympic SC	31–39	Zamalek SC	Olympic Hall, Alexandria
Thursday, 25 March 2021; 16:00 CET (UTC+1)		(–)		Olympic Hall, Alexandria

(Round 10)

Friday, 26 March 2021; 16:00 CET (UTC+1)	Sporting SC	26–28	Zamalek SC	Sporting Club Hall, Alexandria
Friday, 26 March 2021; 16:00 CET (UTC+1)		(–)		Sporting Club Hall, Alexandria

(Round 11)

Thursday, 8 April 2021; 18:00 CET (UTC+1)	Zamalek SC	41–34	Heliopolis	Abdulrahman Fawzi Hall, Cairo
Thursday, 8 April 2021; 18:00 CET (UTC+1)		(–)		Abdulrahman Fawzi Hall, Cairo

(Round 12)

Friday, 9 April 2021; 18:00 CET (UTC+1)	Zamalek SC	28–26	Tala'ea El Gaish SC	Abdulrahman Fawzi Hall, Cairo
Friday, 9 April 2021; 18:00 CET (UTC+1)		(–)		Abdulrahman Fawzi Hall, Cairo

(Round 13)

Thursday, 15 April 2021; 22:30 CET (UTC+1)	Zamalek SC	34–24	Aviation Club	Abdulrahman Fawzi Hall, Cairo
Thursday, 15 April 2021; 22:30 CET (UTC+1)		(–)		Abdulrahman Fawzi Hall, Cairo

(Round 14)

Friday, 16 April 2021; 21:00 CET (UTC+1)	Zamalek SC	28–28	Al Ahly SC	6th of October Sports Hall, Cairo
Friday, 16 April 2021; 21:00 CET (UTC+1)		(–)		6th of October Sports Hall, Cairo

=== Playoff ===
Monday, 19 Apr 2021; 22:00 CAT (UTC+2)	Zamalek SC	18–17	Al Ahly SC	6th of October Sports Hall, Cairo
Monday, 19 Apr 2021; 22:00 CAT (UTC+2)		(11–10)		6th of October Sports Hall, Cairo

== Egyptian Cup ==
(Round of 16)

Tuesday, 30 March 2021; 16:00 CET (UTC+1)	Zamalek SC	37–13	Omal Qena Club	Abdulrahman Fawzi Hall, Cairo
Tuesday, 30 March 2021; 16:00 CET (UTC+1)		(–)		Abdulrahman Fawzi Hall, Cairo

(quarter-finals)

Monday, 5 April 2021; 14:00 CET (UTC+1)	Zamalek SC	10–0	Assiut Club	Abdulrahman Fawzi Hall, Cairo
Monday, 5 April 2021; 14:00 CET (UTC+1)		(Withdrawal)		Abdulrahman Fawzi Hall, Cairo

(semi-finals)

Friday, 23 April 2021; 22:30 CET (UTC+1)	Zamalek SC	30–29	Heliopolis	Abdulrahman Fawzi Hall, Cairo
Friday, 23 April 2021; 22:30 CET (UTC+1)		(–)		Abdulrahman Fawzi Hall, Cairo

(finals)

Saturday, 24 April 2021; 22:30 CAT (UTC+2)	Al Ahly SC	26–23	Zamalek SC	6th of October Sports Hall, Cairo
Saturday, 24 April 2021; 22:30 CAT (UTC+2)		(–)		6th of October Sports Hall, Cairo

== Records and statistics ==
- Season Topscorer : Ahmed El-Ahmar (123 Goals)
- Biggest Win : 43–13 Vs Aviation
- Biggest Defeat : 24–30 Vs Sporting
- Longest Wins Run : 12 Game
  - (from 18 February 2021 to 15 April 2021)
- Longest Unbeaten Run : 15 Game
  - (from 18 February 2021 to 24 April 2021)
- Derby : 2 Win – 1 Draw – 1 Lose
