= 2021–22 Zamalek SC (handball) =

53rd season in existence of Zamalek SC (handball)

Zamalek Handball Club
2021–22 season
- Head coach: (Spain) Olivier Roy
- Stadium: The Covered Hall (Abdulrahman Fawzi Hall)
Home colours	Away colours

The 2021–22 season is the 64th season in the club history of the handball branch of Zamalek, the season began with African Handball Super Cup on 10 September 2021, as Zamalek competes for the Egyptian Handball League, Egypt Handball Cup and IHF Super Globe.

== Current squad ==
=== Staff ===
Staff for the 2020–21 season.

Pos.	Name
Head coach	(Spain) Olivier Roy
Assistant coach	(Egypt) Mohamed Sharaf El-Din
Team manager	(Egypt) Hamada Abdelbary
Club doctor	(Egypt) Amr Ali
Physiotherapist	(Egypt) Ahmed Jamal
Masseur	(Egypt) Mustafa Al-Sunni

=== Team ===
Squad for the 2021–22 season.

Note: Flags indicate national team as defined under FIFA eligibility rules; some limited exceptions apply. Players may hold more than one non-FIFA nationality.

No.	Pos.	Nation	Player
12	GK	(Egypt) EGY	Hesham El-Sobky
72	GK	(Egypt) EGY	Mahmoud Khalil
88	GK	(Egypt) EGY	Karim Handawy
3	LW	(Egypt) EGY	Mazen Reda
11	LW	(Egypt) EGY	Ahmed Moamen Safa
31	LW	(Egypt) EGY	Omar Al-Wakil
1	RW	(Egypt) EGY	Akram Yosri
55	RW	(Egypt) EGY	Hazem Mamdouh
4	LP	(Egypt) EGY	Mohamed Ramadan
24	LP	(Egypt) EGY	Khalid Waleed
25	LP	(Egypt) EGY	Wisam Nawar

No.	Pos.	Nation	Player
10	LB	(Egypt) EGY	Ali Hesham Nasr
39	LB	(Egypt) EGY	Yehia El-Deraa
42	LB	(Egypt) EGY	Hassan Walid
8	CB	(Egypt) EGY	Mohamed El-Bassiouny
20	CB	(Egypt) EGY	Mohamed Alaa
45	CB	(Egypt) EGY	Seif El-Deraa
9	RB	(Egypt) EGY	Mustafa Beshir
18	RB	(Egypt) EGY	Ahmed Hossam
66	RB	(Egypt) EGY	Ahmed El-Ahmar (C)

== Competitions ==
=== Overview ===
Competition	First match	Last match	Starting round	Final position	Record							
Competition	First match	Last match	Starting round	Final position	Pld	W	D	L	PF	PA	PD	Win %
A-Super	10 September 2021		Final	Winners	1	1	0	0	28	27	+1	100.00
S-Globe	6 October 2021	9 October 2021	Quarter Finals	5th	3	2	0	1	112	77	+35	66.67
League	16 September 2021	31 March 2022	Round 1	Winners	33	30	3	0	1,185	898	+287	90.91
Cup	5 February 2022	8 April 2022	R 1/16	Runners Up	4	3	0	1	136	101	+35	75.00
Pro Super Cup	26 April 2022	28 April 2022	Round 1	Winners	3	3	0	0	99	86	+13	100.00
A-Super	8 May 2022		Final	Runners Up	1	0	0	1	31	32	−1	0.00
A-Winners' Cup	10 May 2022	19 May 2022	Group Stage	Winners	6	6	0	0	252	153	+99	100.00
Total					51	45	3	3	1,843	1,374	+469	88.24

Source: Competitions

== 2021 African Super Cup ==
The season began with the African Handball Super Cup on 10 September 2021, and ended with Zamalek achieving the African title for the 7th times in the Club History.

Friday, 10 September 2021; 19:00 CET (UTC+1)	Zamalek SC	28-27	Al Ahly SC	6th of October Sports Hall, Cairo
Friday, 10 September 2021; 19:00 CET (UTC+1)		(14–16)		6th of October Sports Hall, Cairo

== 2021 IHF Super Globe ==
This competition was held in a knock-out format starting from the quarterfinals qualification, and 10 teams participated in this competition, Zamalek began directly from the quarterfinals.

=== Quarter-finals ===
Wednesday 6 October 2021; 20:30 CET (UTC+1)	FC Barcelona	36–32	Zamalek SC	King Abdullah Sport City Hall, Jeddah; Referees: Gubica, Milošević (CRO)
Wednesday 6 October 2021; 20:30 CET (UTC+1)	Frade, Mem 7	(18–17)	Akram 7	King Abdullah Sport City Hall, Jeddah; Referees: Gubica, Milošević (CRO)
Wednesday 6 October 2021; 20:30 CET (UTC+1)	4× (suspension)	Report	1× (yellow card) 3× (suspension)	King Abdullah Sport City Hall, Jeddah; Referees: Gubica, Milošević (CRO)

=== Placement round 5–10 ===
Group B

Pos	Team	Pld	W	D	L	GF	GA	GD	Pts
1	Zamalek SC	2	2	0	0	80	41	+39	4
2	Sydney University	2	0	1	1	45	64	−19	1
3	Al Wehda	2	0	1	1	48	68	−20	1

Source: IHF
Rules for classification: 1) points; 2) head-to-head points; 3) head-to-head goal difference; 4) head-to-head number of goals scored; 5) goal difference.

Thursday 7 October 2021; 16:00 CET (UTC+1)	Sydney University	19–38	Zamalek SC	King Abdullah Sport City Hall, Jeddah; Attendance: 1,350; Referees: Gatelis, Mažeika (LTU)
Thursday 7 October 2021; 16:00 CET (UTC+1)	Dippe 8	(07–18)	Akram 7	King Abdullah Sport City Hall, Jeddah; Attendance: 1,350; Referees: Gatelis, Mažeika (LTU)
Thursday 7 October 2021; 16:00 CET (UTC+1)	2× (yellow card) 6× (suspension)	Report	1× (yellow card) 6× (suspension)	King Abdullah Sport City Hall, Jeddah; Attendance: 1,350; Referees: Gatelis, Mažeika (LTU)

Saturday 9 October 2021; 16:00 CET (UTC+1)	Zamalek SC	42–22	Al Wehda	King Abdullah Sport City Hall, Jeddah; Attendance: 1,560; Referees: Nachevski, Nikolov (MKD)
Saturday 9 October 2021; 16:00 CET (UTC+1)	Akram 9	(19–10)	Barabash 5	King Abdullah Sport City Hall, Jeddah; Attendance: 1,560; Referees: Nachevski, Nikolov (MKD)
Saturday 9 October 2021; 16:00 CET (UTC+1)	3× (suspension)	Report	3× (suspension)	King Abdullah Sport City Hall, Jeddah; Attendance: 1,560; Referees: Nachevski, Nikolov (MKD)

== Egyptian League ==
=== First stage ===
Pos	Team	Pld	W	D	L	GF	GA	GD	Pts
1	Zamalek SC	17	17	0	0	658	467	+191	51

=== Matches ===
(Round 1)

Thursday, 16 September 2021; 18:00 CET (UTC+1)	Zamalek SC	33–31	Heliopolis	Abdulrahman Fawzi Hall, Cairo
Thursday, 16 September 2021; 18:00 CET (UTC+1)		(20–18)		Abdulrahman Fawzi Hall, Cairo

(Round 2)

Friday, 17 September 2021; 18:00 CET (UTC+1)	Zamalek SC	44–32	El Shams SC	Abdulrahman Fawzi Hall, Cairo
Friday, 17 September 2021; 18:00 CET (UTC+1)		(22–17)		Abdulrahman Fawzi Hall, Cairo

(Round 3)

Thursday, 23 September 2021; 16:00 CET (UTC+1)	Zamalek SC	32–27	Al-Ahly	Suez Canal Authority Hall, Ismailia
Thursday, 23 September 2021; 16:00 CET (UTC+1)		(17–13)		Suez Canal Authority Hall, Ismailia

(Round 4)

Friday, 24 September 2021; 20:00 CET (UTC+1)	Maadi Club	21-32	Zamalek SC	El Maady Olympic Center Hall, Cairo
Friday, 24 September 2021; 20:00 CET (UTC+1)		(09–14)		El Maady Olympic Center Hall, Cairo

(Round 5)

Thursday, 30 September 2021; 16:00 CET (UTC+1)	Bank Al Ahli	25-29	Zamalek SC	Olympic Center Hall, Alexandria
Thursday, 30 September 2021; 16:00 CET (UTC+1)		(10–18)		Olympic Center Hall, Alexandria

(Round 6)

Friday, 1 October 2021; 18:00 CET (UTC+1)	6th October SC	26-45	Zamalek SC	6th of October Hall, Cairo
Friday, 1 October 2021; 18:00 CET (UTC+1)		(13–22)		6th of October Hall, Cairo

(Round 7)

Thursday, 14 October 2021; 18:00 CET (UTC+1)	Zamalek SC	44-23	Al Hiwar Club	Abdulrahman Fawzi Hall, Cairo
Thursday, 14 October 2021; 18:00 CET (UTC+1)		(23–12)		Abdulrahman Fawzi Hall, Cairo

(Round 8)

Friday, 15 October 2021; 18:00 CET (UTC+1)	Zamalek SC	48-31	Mansoura Stadium Club	Abdulrahman Fawzi Hall, Cairo
Friday, 15 October 2021; 18:00 CET (UTC+1)		(23–18)		Abdulrahman Fawzi Hall, Cairo

(Round 9)

Thursday, 21 October 2021; 18:00 CET (UTC+1)	Horses Owners Club	27-43	Zamalek SC	Delfi Hall, Cairo
Thursday, 21 October 2021; 18:00 CET (UTC+1)		(14–19)		Delfi Hall, Cairo

(Round 10)

Friday, 22 October 2021; 18:00 CET (UTC+1)	Olympic SC	29-33	Zamalek SC	Olympic Hall, Cairo
Friday, 22 October 2021; 18:00 CET (UTC+1)		(13–16)		Olympic Hall, Cairo

(Round 11)

Thursday, 11 November 2021; 18:00 CET (UTC+1)	Zamalek SC	36–19	Aviation Club	Abdulrahman Fawzi Hall, Cairo
Thursday, 11 November 2021; 18:00 CET (UTC+1)		(12–10)		Abdulrahman Fawzi Hall, Cairo

(Round 12)

Friday, 12 November 2021; 18:00 CET (UTC+1)	Zamalek SC	39–26	El Zohour SC	Abdulrahman Fawzi Hall, Cairo
Friday, 12 November 2021; 18:00 CET (UTC+1)		(22–13)		Abdulrahman Fawzi Hall, Cairo

(Round 13)

Thursday, 18 November 2021; 18:00 CET (UTC+1)	Zamalek SC	42–31	Tala'ea El Gaish SC	Abdulrahman Fawzi Hall, Cairo
Thursday, 18 November 2021; 18:00 CET (UTC+1)		(23–08)		Abdulrahman Fawzi Hall, Cairo

(Round 14)

Friday, 19 November 2021; 18:00 CET (UTC+1)	Zamalek SC	46-39	Heliolido Club	Abdulrahman Fawzi Hall, Cairo
Friday, 19 November 2021; 18:00 CET (UTC+1)		(24–19)		Abdulrahman Fawzi Hall, Cairo

(Round 15)

Thursday, 25 November 2021; 18:00 CET (UTC+1)	Gezira SC	24-41	Zamalek SC	Ittihad-Elshorta Hall, Cairo
Thursday, 25 November 2021; 18:00 CET (UTC+1)		(09–17)		Ittihad-Elshorta Hall, Cairo

(Round 16)

Sunday, 28 November 2021; 16:00 CET (UTC+1)	Sporting SC	32–35	Zamalek SC	Sporting Club Hall, Alexandria
Sunday, 28 November 2021; 16:00 CET (UTC+1)		(11–16)		Sporting Club Hall, Alexandria

(Round 17)

Monday, 29 November 2021; 18:00 CET (UTC+1)	Smouha SC	25-36	Zamalek SC	Smouha Club Hall, Alexandria
Monday, 29 November 2021; 18:00 CET (UTC+1)		(11–18)		Smouha Club Hall, Alexandria

=== Second stage ===
Pos	Team	Pld	W	D	L	GF	GA	GD	Pts
1	Zamalek SC	10	8	2	0	326	262	+64	28

=== Matches ===
(Round 1)

Monday 17 January 2022; 18:00 CET (UTC+1)	Zamalek SC	28–20	Bank Al Ahli	Abdulrahman Fawzi Hall, Cairo
Monday 17 January 2022; 18:00 CET (UTC+1)		(9–10)		Abdulrahman Fawzi Hall, Cairo

(Round 2)

Thursday 20 January 2022; 18:00 CET (UTC+1)	Smouha SC	28–30	Zamalek SC	Smouha Hall, Alexandria
Thursday 20 January 2022; 18:00 CET (UTC+1)		(11–14)		Smouha Hall, Alexandria

(Round 3)

Monday 24 January 2022; 16:00 CET (UTC+1)	Zamalek SC	31–30	Tala'ea El Gaish SC	Abdulrahman Fawzi Hall, Cairo
Monday 24 January 2022; 16:00 CET (UTC+1)		(17–16)		Abdulrahman Fawzi Hall, Cairo

(Round 4)

Thursday 27 January 2022; 17:00 CET (UTC+1)	Sporting SC	26–29	Zamalek SC	Sporting Hall, Alexandria
Thursday 27 January 2022; 17:00 CET (UTC+1)		(12–18)		Sporting Hall, Alexandria

(Round 5)

Monday 31 January 2022; 20:30 CET (UTC+1)	Zamalek SC	29–29	Al Ahly SC	6th of October Sports Hall, Cairo
Monday 31 January 2022; 20:30 CET (UTC+1)		(15–16)		6th of October Sports Hall, Cairo

(Round 6)

Thursday 10 February 2022; 18:00 CET (UTC+1)	Bank Al Ahli	17–39	Zamalek SC	Armed forces Hall, Cairo
Thursday 10 February 2022; 18:00 CET (UTC+1)		(9–18)		Armed forces Hall, Cairo

(Round 7)

Thursday 17 February 2022; 15:00 CET (UTC+1)	Zamalek SC	29–28	Smouha SC	Abdulrahman Fawzi Hall, Cairo
Thursday 17 February 2022; 15:00 CET (UTC+1)		(17–13)		Abdulrahman Fawzi Hall, Cairo

(Round 8)

Friday 18 February 2022; 16:00 CET (UTC+1)	Tala'ea El Gaish SC	22–44	Zamalek SC	Tallaa Elgish Hall, Cairo
Friday 18 February 2022; 16:00 CET (UTC+1)		(10–24)		Tallaa Elgish Hall, Cairo

(Round 9)

Thursday 24 February 2022; 14:00 CET (UTC+1)	Zamalek SC	36–31	Sporting SC	Abdulrahman Fawzi Hall, Cairo
Thursday 24 February 2022; 14:00 CET (UTC+1)		(18–15)		Abdulrahman Fawzi Hall, Cairo

(Round 10)

Friday 25 February 2022; 18:00 CET (UTC+1)	Al Ahly SC	31–31	Zamalek SC	6th of October Sports Hall, Cairo
Friday 25 February 2022; 18:00 CET (UTC+1)		(12–17)		6th of October Sports Hall, Cairo

=== Final stage ===
Pos	Team	Pld	W	D	L	GF	GA	GD	Pts
1	Zamalek SC	6	5	1	0	201	169	+32	17

=== Matches ===
(Round 1)

Wednesday 9 March 2022; 16:00 CET (UTC+1)	Zamalek SC	34–29	Tala'ea El Gaish SC	6th of October Sports Hall, Cairo
Wednesday 9 March 2022; 16:00 CET (UTC+1)		(18–17)		6th of October Sports Hall, Cairo

(Round 2)

Thursday 10 March 2022; 18:00 CET (UTC+1)	Sporting	36–36	Zamalek SC	6th of October Sports Hall, Cairo
Thursday 10 March 2022; 18:00 CET (UTC+1)		(14–22)		6th of October Sports Hall, Cairo

(Round 3)

Friday 11 March 2022; 17:00 CET (UTC+1)	Zamalek SC	34–28	Al Ahly	6th of October Sports Hall, Cairo
Friday 11 March 2022; 17:00 CET (UTC+1)		(12–11)		6th of October Sports Hall, Cairo

(Round 4)

Tuesday 29 March 2022; 13:30 CET (UTC+1)	Tala'ea El Gaish SC	26–30	Zamalek SC	6th of October Sports Hall, Cairo
Tuesday 29 March 2022; 13:30 CET (UTC+1)		(14–15)		6th of October Sports Hall, Cairo

(Round 5)

Wednesday 30 March 2022; 18:00 CET (UTC+1)	Zamalek SC	38–28	Sporting	6th of October Sports Hall, Cairo
Wednesday 30 March 2022; 18:00 CET (UTC+1)		(21–13)		6th of October Sports Hall, Cairo

(Round 6)

Thursday 31 March 2022; 18:00 CET (UTC+1)	Al Ahly	22–29	Zamalek SC	6th of October Sports Hall, Cairo
Thursday 31 March 2022; 18:00 CET (UTC+1)		(8–13)		6th of October Sports Hall, Cairo

== Egyptian Cup ==
(Round of 16)

Saturday 5 February 2022; 14:00 CET (UTC+1)	Zamalek SC	45–14	Tima Club	Abdulrahman Fawzi Hall, Cairo
Saturday 5 February 2022; 14:00 CET (UTC+1)		(25–03)		Abdulrahman Fawzi Hall, Cairo

(quarter-finals)

Thursday 3 March 2022; 16:00 CET (UTC+1)	Tala'ea El Gaish SC	29–33	Zamalek SC	Tallaa Elgish Hall, Cairo
Thursday 3 March 2022; 16:00 CET (UTC+1)		(15–17)		Tallaa Elgish Hall, Cairo

(semi-finals)

Thursday 7 April 2022; 23:00 CET (UTC+1)	Zamalek SC	28–25	Bank Al Ahli	Arab Contractors Hall, Cairo
Thursday 7 April 2022; 23:00 CET (UTC+1)		(14–12)		Arab Contractors Hall, Cairo

(finals)

Friday 8 April 2022; 23:00 CET (UTC+1)	Zamalek SC	30–33	Sporting SC	Arab Contractors Hall, Cairo
Friday 8 April 2022; 23:00 CET (UTC+1)		(12–16)		Arab Contractors Hall, Cairo

== Pro Super Cup ==
Pos	Team	Pld	W	D	L	GF	GA	GD	Pts
1	Zamalek SC	3	3	0	0	99	86	+13	9

=== Matches ===
(Round 1)

Tuesday 26 April 2022; 23:00 CET (UTC+1)	Zamalek SC	36–28	Sporting SC	6th of October Sports Hall, Cairo
Tuesday 26 April 2022; 23:00 CET (UTC+1)		(17–16)		6th of October Sports Hall, Cairo

(Round 2)

Wednesday 27 April 2022; 23:00 CET (UTC+1)	Zamalek SC	35–33	Heliopolis	6th of October Sports Hall, Cairo
Wednesday 27 April 2022; 23:00 CET (UTC+1)		(17–11)		6th of October Sports Hall, Cairo

(Round 3)

Thursday 28 April 2022; 23:00 CET (UTC+1)	Zamalek SC	28–25	Al Ahly SC	6th of October Sports Hall, Cairo
Thursday 28 April 2022; 23:00 CET (UTC+1)		(15–13)		6th of October Sports Hall, Cairo

== 2022 African Super Cup ==
Sunday 8 May 2022; 19:00 CET (UTC+1)	Zamalek SC	31–32	Al Ahly SC	General Sports Hall, Niamey
Sunday 8 May 2022; 19:00 CET (UTC+1)		(19–16)		General Sports Hall, Niamey

== African Cup Winners' Cup ==
Pos	Team	Pld	W	D	L	GF	GA	GD	Pts
1	Zamalek SC	3	3	0	0	133	73	+60	6

=== Matches ===
(Round 1)

Tuesday 10 May 2022; 17:00 CET (UTC+1)	Zamalek SC	45–29	RC Flowers	General Sports Hall, Niamey
Tuesday 10 May 2022; 17:00 CET (UTC+1)		(22–15)		General Sports Hall, Niamey

(Round 2)

Wednesday 11 May 2022; 19:00 CET (UTC+1)	Zamalek SC	43–23	AS Niamey	General Sports Hall, Niamey
Wednesday 11 May 2022; 19:00 CET (UTC+1)		(20–11)		General Sports Hall, Niamey

(Round 3)

Friday 13 May 2022; 17:00 CET (UTC+1)	Zamalek SC	45–21	Kano Pillars	General Sports Hall, Niamey
Friday 13 May 2022; 17:00 CET (UTC+1)		(23–10)		General Sports Hall, Niamey

(quarter-finals)

Saturday 14 May 2022; 15:00 CET (UTC+1)	Zamalek SC	54–31	Kirkos	General Sports Hall, Niamey
Saturday 14 May 2022; 15:00 CET (UTC+1)		(27–13)		General Sports Hall, Niamey

(semi-finals)

Tuesday 17 May 2022; 19:00 CET (UTC+1)	Zamalek SC	36–21	FAP Yaoundé	General Sports Hall, Niamey
Tuesday 17 May 2022; 19:00 CET (UTC+1)		(20–10)		General Sports Hall, Niamey

(finals)

Thursday 19 May 2022; 19:00 CET (UTC+1)	Zamalek SC	29–28	Al Ahly SC	General Sports Hall, Niamey
Thursday 19 May 2022; 19:00 CET (UTC+1)		(15–15)		General Sports Hall, Niamey

== Records and statistics ==
- Season Topscorer : Ahmed El-Ahmar (254 Goals)
- Biggest Win : 54–31 Vs Kirkos
- Biggest Defeat : 32–36 Vs Barcelona
- Longest Wins Run : 23 Game
  - (from 7 October 2021 to 31 January 2022)
- Longest Unbeaten Run : 35 Game
  - (from 7 October 2021 to 8 April 2022)
- Derby : 6 Win – 2 Draw – 1 Lose
