= 2022–23 Zamalek SC (handball) =

53rd season in existence of Zamalek SC (handball)

Zamalek Handball Club
- Head coach: (Spain) Mateo Garralda
- Stadium: The Covered Hall (Abdulrahman Fawzi Hall)
Home colours	Away colours

The 2022–23 season is the 65th season in the club history of the handball branch of Zamalek SC, the season began with Egyptian Super Cup on the 10 September 2022, as Zamalek competes for the Egyptian Handball League, Egyptian Cup and African Handball Super Cup, Arab Handball Championship of Champions and African Handball Champions League, African Cup Winners' Cup.

== Current squad ==
=== Staff ===
Staff for the 2022–23 season.

Pos.	Name
General Manager	(Egypt) Hosam Abdallah
Sport Director	(Egypt) Hamada Abdelbary
Head coach	(Spain) Mateo Garralda
Assistant coach	(Egypt) Mohamed Sharaf El-Din
Club doctor	(Egypt) Amr Ali
Physiotherapist	(Egypt) Mohamed Ashraf
Masseur	(Egypt) Mustafa Al-Sunni

=== Team ===
Squad for the 2022–23 season.

Goalkeepers

- 88 (Egypt) Karim Handawy
- 72 (Egypt) Mahmoud Khalil
- 12 (Egypt) Hesham El-Sobky

Left Wingers

- 11 (Egypt) Ahmed Moamen Safa
- 31 (Egypt) Omar Al-Wakil
- 3 (Egypt) Mazen Reda

Right Wingers

- 55 (Egypt) Hazem Mamdouh
- 1 (Egypt) Akram Yosri

Line Players

- 25 (Egypt) Wisam Nawar
- 24 (Egypt) Khalid Waleed
- 77 (Egypt) Shady Khalil
- 4 (Egypt) Mohamed Ramadan
- 41 (Egypt) Mohamed Tarek

Left Backs

- 44 (Egypt) Mohamed Yassin
- 10 (Egypt) Ali Hesham Nasr
- 42 (Egypt) Hassan Walid
- 23 (Argentina) James Parker

Central Backs

- 20 (Egypt) Mohamed Alaa
- 8 (Egypt) Mohamed El-Bassiouny

Right Backs

- 66 (Egypt) Ahmed El-Ahmar (C)
- 9 (Egypt) Mustafa Beshir
- 18 (Egypt) Ahmed Hossam

== Competitions ==
=== Overview ===
Competition	First match	Last match	Starting round	Final position	Record							
Competition	First match	Last match	Starting round	Final position	Pld	W	D	L	PF	PA	PD	Win %
League	20 October 2022	7 April 2023	Round 1	2nd	32	27	2	3	1,069	842	+227	84.38
Cup	30 October 2022	14 April 2023	R 1/32	3rd	5	4	0	1	188	124	+64	80.00
A-Super	6 May 2023	7 May 2023	Semi Finals	Runners Up	2	1	0	1	69	52	+17	50.00
E-Super	10 September 2022	12 September 2022	Round 1	Winners	2	2	0	0	64	58	+6	100.00
Champions League	1 October 2022	9 October 2022	Group Stage	Runners Up	7	5	0	2	231	166	+65	71.43
Arab-CL	17 September 2022	27 September 2022	Group Stage	Runners Up	6	5	0	1	157	128	+29	83.33
A-Winners' Cup	9 May 2023	18 May 2023	Group Stage	Winners	7	7	0	0	272	161	+111	100.00
Total					61	51	2	8	2,050	1,531	+519	83.61

Source: Competitions

== Egyptian Super Cup ==
Pos	Team	Pld	W	D	L	GF	GA	GD	Pts
1	Zamalek SC	2	2	0	0	64	58	+6	6

=== Matches ===
(Round 1)

Saturday 10 September 2022
21:00 CET (UTC+1)
Zamalek SC
37–36 (ET)
Sporting SC
6th of October Sports Hall, Cairo

(13–15)

FT: 29–29 ET: 37–36

(Round 2)

Monday 12 September 2022; 21:00 CET (UTC+1)	Zamalek SC	27–23	Al Ahly SC	6th of October Sports Hall, Cairo
Monday 12 September 2022; 21:00 CET (UTC+1)		(13–11)		6th of October Sports Hall, Cairo

== Arab Championship of Champions Club ==
Pos	Team	Pld	W	D	L	GF	GA	GD	Pts
1	Zamalek SC	3	3	0	0	88	74	+14	6

=== Matches ===
(Round 1)

Saturday 17 September 2022; 18:30 CET (UTC+1)	ES Tunis HC	28–34	Zamalek SC	Salle Omnisports de Hammamet, Hammamet, Tunisia
Saturday 17 September 2022; 18:30 CET (UTC+1)		(13–16)		Salle Omnisports de Hammamet, Hammamet, Tunisia

(Round 2)

Sunday 18 September 2022; 16:30 CET (UTC+1)	Zamalek SC	23–20	Kuwait SC	Salle Omnisports de Hammamet, Hammamet, Tunisia
Sunday 18 September 2022; 16:30 CET (UTC+1)		(12–10)		Salle Omnisports de Hammamet, Hammamet, Tunisia

(Round 3)

Tuesday 20 September 2022; 16:00 CET (UTC+1)	Zamalek SC	31–26	MC Alger	Salle Omnisports de Hammamet, Hammamet, Tunisia
Tuesday 20 September 2022; 16:00 CET (UTC+1)		(17–16)		Salle Omnisports de Hammamet, Hammamet, Tunisia

(quarter-finals)

Thursday 22 September 2022; 11:00 CET (UTC+1)	Zamalek SC	10–0	JSM Skikda	Salle Omnisports de Hammamet, Hammamet, Tunisia
Thursday 22 September 2022; 11:00 CET (UTC+1)		(Withdrawal)		Salle Omnisports de Hammamet, Hammamet, Tunisia

(semi-finals)

Sunday 25 September 2022; 18:30 CET (UTC+1)	Kuwait SC	25–31	Zamalek SC	Salle Omnisports de Hammamet, Hammamet, Tunisia
Sunday 25 September 2022; 18:30 CET (UTC+1)		(10–14)		Salle Omnisports de Hammamet, Hammamet, Tunisia

(finals)

Tuesday 27 September 2022
18:30 CET (UTC+1)
ES Tunis HC
29–28 (ET)
Zamalek SC
Salle Omnisports de Hammamet, Hammamet, Tunisia

(10–10)

FT: 25–25 ET: 29–28

== African Champions League ==
Pos	Team	Pld	W	D	L	GF	GA	GD	Pts
1	Zamalek SC	4	3	0	1	148	96	+52	6

=== Matches ===
(Round 1)

Saturday 1 October 2022; 20:00 CET (UTC+1)	Zamalek SC	40–17	Red Star OJA	Salle couverte des sports collectifs De Nabeul, Nabeul, Tunisia
Saturday 1 October 2022; 20:00 CET (UTC+1)		(21–08)		Salle couverte des sports collectifs De Nabeul, Nabeul, Tunisia

(Round 2)

Sunday 2 October 2022; 20:00 CET (UTC+1)	Zamalek SC	34–25	MC Alger	Salle couverte des sports collectifs De Nabeul, Nabeul, Tunisia
Sunday 2 October 2022; 20:00 CET (UTC+1)		(17–11)		Salle couverte des sports collectifs De Nabeul, Nabeul, Tunisia

(Round 3)

Monday 3 October 2022; 20:00 CET (UTC+1)	Zamalek SC	43–21	FAP Yaoundé	Salle Omnisports de Hammamet, Hammamet, Tunisia
Monday 3 October 2022; 20:00 CET (UTC+1)		(21–11)		Salle Omnisports de Hammamet, Hammamet, Tunisia

(Round 4)

Wednesday 5 October 2022; 18:30 CET (UTC+1)	Club Africain	33–31	Zamalek SC	Salle Omnisports de Hammamet, Hammamet, Tunisia
Wednesday 5 October 2022; 18:30 CET (UTC+1)		(18–17)		Salle Omnisports de Hammamet, Hammamet, Tunisia

(quarter-finals)

Thursday 6 October 2022; 20:30 CET (UTC+1)	Zamalek SC	33–17	JS Kinshasa	Salle Omnisports de Hammamet, Hammamet, Tunisia
Thursday 6 October 2022; 20:30 CET (UTC+1)		(15–07)		Salle Omnisports de Hammamet, Hammamet, Tunisia

(semi-finals)

Friday 7 October 2022; 18:30 CET (UTC+1)	Al Ahly SC	25–26	Zamalek SC	Salle Omnisports de Hammamet, Hammamet, Tunisia
Friday 7 October 2022; 18:30 CET (UTC+1)		(13–13)		Salle Omnisports de Hammamet, Hammamet, Tunisia

(finals)

Sunday 9 October 2022; 18:30 CET (UTC+1)	ES Tunis HC	28–24	Zamalek SC	Salle Omnisports de Hammamet, Hammamet, Tunisia
Sunday 9 October 2022; 18:30 CET (UTC+1)		(12–10)		Salle Omnisports de Hammamet, Hammamet, Tunisia

== Egyptian League ==
=== First Stage ===
Pos	Team	Pld	W	D	L	GF	GA	GD	Pts
1	Zamalek SC	17	16	0	1	632	466	+166	49

=== Matches ===
(Round 1)

Friday, 25 November 2022; 16:00 CET (UTC+1)	Smouha SC	25–33	Zamalek SC	Smouha Hall, Alexandria
Friday, 25 November 2022; 16:00 CET (UTC+1)		(10–15)		Smouha Hall, Alexandria

(Round 2)

Thursday, 24 November 2022; 14:00 CET (UTC+1)	Olympic SC	27–39	Zamalek SC	Olympic Hall, Alexandria
Thursday, 24 November 2022; 14:00 CET (UTC+1)		(13–17)		Olympic Hall, Alexandria

(Round 3)

Monday, 5 December 2022; 17:00 CET (UTC+1)	Zamalek SC	20–19	Al Ahly SC	6th of October Sports Hall, Cairo
Monday, 5 December 2022; 17:00 CET (UTC+1)		(13–10)		6th of October Sports Hall, Cairo

(Round 4)

Tuesday, 6 December 2022; 17:00 CET (UTC+1)	Zamalek SC	41–27	Maadi Club	Abdulrahman Fawzi Hall, Cairo
Tuesday, 6 December 2022; 17:00 CET (UTC+1)		(20–10)		Abdulrahman Fawzi Hall, Cairo

(Round 5)

Monday, 31 October 2022; 18:00 CET (UTC+1)	Aviation SC	23–39	Zamalek SC	Aviation Club Hall, Cairo
Monday, 31 October 2022; 18:00 CET (UTC+1)		(–)		Aviation Club Hall, Cairo

(Round 6)

Monday, 14 November 2022; 17:00 CET (UTC+1)	Zamalek SC	44–30	El Zohour SC	Abdulrahman Fawzi Hall, Cairo
Monday, 14 November 2022; 17:00 CET (UTC+1)		(18–11)		Abdulrahman Fawzi Hall, Cairo

(Round 7)

Thursday, 17 November 2022; 17:00 CET (UTC+1)	Zamalek SC	37–32	Tala'ea El Gaish SC	Abdulrahman Fawzi Hall, Cairo
Thursday, 17 November 2022; 17:00 CET (UTC+1)		(19–15)		Abdulrahman Fawzi Hall, Cairo

(Round 8)

Friday, 18 November 2022; 17:00 CET (UTC+1)	Zamalek SC	41–29	Heliolido SC	Abdulrahman Fawzi Hall, Cairo
Friday, 18 November 2022; 17:00 CET (UTC+1)		(16–11)		Abdulrahman Fawzi Hall, Cairo

(Round 9)

Thursday, 20 October 2022; 18:00 CET (UTC+1)	Sporting SC	33–27	Zamalek SC	Sporting Club Hall, Alexandria
Thursday, 20 October 2022; 18:00 CET (UTC+1)		(15–14)		Sporting Club Hall, Alexandria

(Round 10)

Friday, 21 October 2022; 17:00 CET (UTC+1)	Delphi Club	25–42	Zamalek SC	Delphi Sports Club Hall, Alexandria
Friday, 21 October 2022; 17:00 CET (UTC+1)		(11–19)		Delphi Sports Club Hall, Alexandria

(Round 11)

Thursday, 27 October 2022; 18:00 CET (UTC+1)	Zamalek SC	36–31	Gezira SC	Abdulrahman Fawzi Hall, Cairo
Thursday, 27 October 2022; 18:00 CET (UTC+1)		(19–11)		Abdulrahman Fawzi Hall, Cairo

(Round 12)

Friday, 2 December 2022; 17:00 CET (UTC+1)	Zamalek SC	37–31	El Obour Club	Abdulrahman Fawzi Hall, Cairo
Friday, 2 December 2022; 17:00 CET (UTC+1)		(16–14)		Abdulrahman Fawzi Hall, Cairo

(Round 13)

Thursday, 3 November 2022; 17:00 CET (UTC+1)	Heliopolis	30–41	Zamalek SC	Heliopolis Sporting Club Hall, Cairo
Thursday, 3 November 2022; 17:00 CET (UTC+1)		(15–19)		Heliopolis Sporting Club Hall, Cairo

(Round 14)

Friday, 4 November 2022; 17:00 CET (UTC+1)	Olympic El Qanal FC	28–32	Zamalek SC	Suez Canal Authority Hall, Ismailia
Friday, 4 November 2022; 17:00 CET (UTC+1)		(15–15)		Suez Canal Authority Hall, Ismailia

(Round 15)

Thursday, 10 November 2022; 17:00 CET (UTC+1)	Zamalek SC	35–22	Bank Al Ahli	Abdulrahman Fawzi Hall, Cairo
Thursday, 10 November 2022; 17:00 CET (UTC+1)		(17–12)		Abdulrahman Fawzi Hall, Cairo

(Round 16)

Monday, 28 November 2022; 17:00 CET (UTC+1)	Zamalek SC	42–27	Geziret Elward Club	Abdulrahman Fawzi Hall, Cairo
Monday, 28 November 2022; 17:00 CET (UTC+1)		(21–11)		Abdulrahman Fawzi Hall, Cairo

(Round 17)

Thursday, 1 December 2022; 17:00 CET (UTC+1)	Zamalek SC	46–27	El Shams SC	Abdulrahman Fawzi Hall, Cairo
Thursday, 1 December 2022; 17:00 CET (UTC+1)		(21–11)		Abdulrahman Fawzi Hall, Cairo

=== Second Stage ===
Pos	Team	Pld	W	D	L	GF	GA	GD	Pts
1	Zamalek SC	10	8	1	1	287	249	+38	27

=== Matches ===
(Round 1)

Thursday, 9 February 2023; 18:00 CET (UTC+1)	Zamalek SC	32–22	Tala'ea El Gaish SC	Abdulrahman Fawzi Hall, Cairo
Thursday, 9 February 2023; 18:00 CET (UTC+1)		(25–13)		Abdulrahman Fawzi Hall, Cairo

(Round 2)

Friday, 10 February 2023; 18:00 CET (UTC+1)	Zamalek SC	35–26	Sporting	Abdulrahman Fawzi Hall, Cairo
Friday, 10 February 2023; 18:00 CET (UTC+1)		(19–13)		Abdulrahman Fawzi Hall, Cairo

(Round 3)

Thursday, 16 February 2023; 18:00 CET (UTC+1)	Smouha SC	26–27	Zamalek SC	Smouha Hall, Alexandria
Thursday, 16 February 2023; 18:00 CET (UTC+1)		(–)		Smouha Hall, Alexandria

(Round 4)

Friday, 17 February 2023; 18:00 CET (UTC+1)	Bank Al Ahli	21–25	Zamalek SC	Olympic Center Hall, Alexandria
Friday, 17 February 2023; 18:00 CET (UTC+1)		(11–11)		Olympic Center Hall, Alexandria

(Round 5)

Thursday, 23 February 2023; 16:00 CET (UTC+1)	Al Ahly	27–22	Zamalek SC	6th of October Sports Hall, Cairo
Thursday, 23 February 2023; 16:00 CET (UTC+1)		(–)		6th of October Sports Hall, Cairo

(Round 6)

Thursday, 2 March 2023; 16:00 CET (UTC+1)	Tala'ea El Gaish SC	33–35	Zamalek SC	Tallaa Elgish Hall, Cairo
Thursday, 2 March 2023; 16:00 CET (UTC+1)		(17–21)		Tallaa Elgish Hall, Cairo

(Round 7)

Friday, 3 March 2023; 18:00 CET (UTC+1)	Sporting	20–26	Zamalek SC	Sporting Hall, Alexandria
Friday, 3 March 2023; 18:00 CET (UTC+1)		(13–14)		Sporting Hall, Alexandria

(Round 8)

Thursday, 16 March 2023; 15:00 CET (UTC+1)	Zamalek SC	27–27	Smouha SC	Abdulrahman Fawzi Hall, Cairo
Thursday, 16 March 2023; 15:00 CET (UTC+1)		(11–12)		Abdulrahman Fawzi Hall, Cairo

(Round 9)

Friday, 17 March 2023; 18:00 CET (UTC+1)	Zamalek SC	27–24	Bank Al Ahli	Abdulrahman Fawzi Hall, Cairo
Friday, 17 March 2023; 18:00 CET (UTC+1)		(12–11)		Abdulrahman Fawzi Hall, Cairo

(Round 10)

Friday, 24 March 2023; 16:00 CET (UTC+1)	Zamalek SC	31–23	Al Ahly	6th of October Sports Hall, Cairo
Friday, 24 March 2023; 16:00 CET (UTC+1)		(16–12)		6th of October Sports Hall, Cairo

=== Final stage ===
Pos	Team	Pld	W	D	L	GF	GA	GD	Pts
1	Zamalek SC	5	3	1	1	151	127	+24	12

=== Matches ===
(Round 1)

Thursday, 30 March 2023; 21:00 CET (UTC+1)	Zamalek SC	39–22	Smouha SC	Sporting Hall, Alexandria
Thursday, 30 March 2023; 21:00 CET (UTC+1)		(20–11)		Sporting Hall, Alexandria

(Round 2)

Friday, 31 March 2023; 23:00 CET (UTC+1)	Tala'ea El Gaish SC	26–29	Zamalek SC	Olympic Center Hall, Alexandria
Friday, 31 March 2023; 23:00 CET (UTC+1)		(15–12)		Olympic Center Hall, Alexandria

(Round 3)

Wednesday, 5 April 2023; 21:00 CET (UTC+1)	Zamalek SC	35–28	Bank Al Ahli	Shorouk Sports Club Hall, Cairo
Wednesday, 5 April 2023; 21:00 CET (UTC+1)		(16–17)		Shorouk Sports Club Hall, Cairo

(Round 4)

Thursday, 6 April 2023; 23:00 CET (UTC+1)	Sporting	27–27	Zamalek SC	Shorouk Sports Club Hall, Cairo
Thursday, 6 April 2023; 23:00 CET (UTC+1)		(13–12)		Shorouk Sports Club Hall, Cairo

(Round 5)

Friday, 7 April 2023; 23:30 CET (UTC+1)	Zamalek SC	21–24	Al Ahly	Shorouk Sports Club Hall, Cairo
Friday, 7 April 2023; 23:30 CET (UTC+1)		(12–12)		Shorouk Sports Club Hall, Cairo

== Egyptian Cup ==
(Round of 32)

Sunday, 30 October 2022; 15:00 CET (UTC+1)	Zamalek SC	53–26	Beni Suef	Abdulrahman Fawzi Hall, Cairo
Sunday, 30 October 2022; 15:00 CET (UTC+1)		(27–11)		Abdulrahman Fawzi Hall, Cairo

(Round of 16)

Sunday, 12 February 2023; 18:00 CET (UTC+1)	Zamalek SC	36–25	El Zohour	Abdulrahman Fawzi Hall, Cairo
Sunday, 12 February 2023; 18:00 CET (UTC+1)		(15–12)		Abdulrahman Fawzi Hall, Cairo

(quarter-finals)

Sunday, 26 March 2023; 18:00 CET (UTC+1)	Zamalek SC	40–20	Aviation	Abdulrahman Fawzi Hall, Cairo
Sunday, 26 March 2023; 18:00 CET (UTC+1)		(20–8)		Abdulrahman Fawzi Hall, Cairo

(semi-finals)

Thursday, 13 April 2023; 23:00 CET (UTC+1)	Zamalek SC	25–27	Al Ahly	Shorouk Sports Club Hall, Cairo
Thursday, 13 April 2023; 23:00 CET (UTC+1)		(13–12)		Shorouk Sports Club Hall, Cairo

(third place)

Thursday, 14 April 2023; 23:00 CET (UTC+1)	Zamalek SC	34–26	Smouha SC	Shorouk Sports Club Hall, Cairo
Thursday, 14 April 2023; 23:00 CET (UTC+1)		(–)		Shorouk Sports Club Hall, Cairo

== 2023 African Super Cup ==
(semi-finals)

Saturday, 6 May 2023; 19:00 CET (UTC+1)	Zamalek SC	45–25	JS Kinshasa	Prince Abdullah Al Faisal Hall, Egypt
Saturday, 6 May 2023; 19:00 CET (UTC+1)		(25–10)		Prince Abdullah Al Faisal Hall, Egypt

(finals)

Sunday, 7 May 2023; 19:00 CET (UTC+1)	Al Ahly	27–24	Zamalek SC	Prince Abdullah Al Faisal Hall, Egypt
Sunday, 7 May 2023; 19:00 CET (UTC+1)		(14–9)		Prince Abdullah Al Faisal Hall, Egypt

== African Cup Winners' Cup ==
Pos	Team	Pld	W	D	L	GF	GA	GD	Pts
1	Zamalek SC	4	4	0	0	173	89	+84	8

=== Matches ===
(Round 1)

Wednesday 10 May 2023; 17:00 CET (UTC+1)	Zamalek SC	41–21	FANZ Yaounde	Prince Abdullah Al Faisal Hall, Egypt
Wednesday 10 May 2023; 17:00 CET (UTC+1)		(23–12)		Prince Abdullah Al Faisal Hall, Egypt

(Round 2)

Thursday 11 May 2023; 17:00 CET (UTC+1)	Zamalek SC	42–22	Red Star	Prince Abdullah Al Faisal Hall, Egypt
Thursday 11 May 2023; 17:00 CET (UTC+1)		(22–10)		Prince Abdullah Al Faisal Hall, Egypt

(Round 3)

Saturday 13 May 2023; 17:00 CET (UTC+1)	Zamalek SC	52–29	Jeunesse Sportive de Kinshasa	Prince Abdullah Al Faisal Hall, Egypt
Saturday 13 May 2023; 17:00 CET (UTC+1)		(27–15)		Prince Abdullah Al Faisal Hall, Egypt

(Round 4)

Sunday 14 May 2023; 17:00 CET (UTC+1)	Zamalek SC	38–17	Widad Samara	Prince Abdullah Al Faisal Hall, Egypt
Sunday 14 May 2023; 17:00 CET (UTC+1)		(16–8)		Prince Abdullah Al Faisal Hall, Egypt

(quarter-finals)

Monday 15 May 2023; 17:00 CET (UTC+1)	Zamalek SC	48–23	Kirkos	Prince Abdullah Al Faisal Hall, Egypt
Monday 15 May 2023; 17:00 CET (UTC+1)		(26–11)		Prince Abdullah Al Faisal Hall, Egypt

(semi-finals)

Wednesday 17 May 2023; 17:00 CET (UTC+1)	Zamalek SC	25–24	Sporting SC	Prince Abdullah Al Faisal Hall, Egypt
Wednesday 17 May 2023; 17:00 CET (UTC+1)		(15–14)		Prince Abdullah Al Faisal Hall, Egypt

(finals)

Thursday 18 May 2023; 17:00 CET (UTC+1)	Zamalek SC	26–25	Al Ahly SC	Prince Abdullah Al Faisal Hall, Egypt
Thursday 18 May 2023; 17:00 CET (UTC+1)		(15–11)		Prince Abdullah Al Faisal Hall, Egypt
