= 2023–24 Zamalek SC (handball) =

Season of a handball club in Giza, Egypt

Zamalek Handball Club
- Head coach: Ahmed Ramadan
- Stadium: The Covered Hall (Abdulrahman Fawzi Hall)
Home colours	Away colours

The 2023–24 season is the 66th season in the club history of the handball branch of Zamalek SC, the season began with Arab Handball Championship of Champions, as Zamalek competes for the Egyptian Handball League, Egyptian Cup and African Handball Super Cup, African Handball Champions League, African Cup Winners' Cup.

== Current squad ==
=== Staff ===
Staff for the 2023–24 season.

- Head Coach: (Egypt) Ahmed Ramadan
- Team Leader: (Egypt) Hamada Abdelbary
- Team Leader: Vacant
- Assistant Coach: (Egypt) Ehab Mohsen
- Team Physician: (Egypt) Amr Ali
- Physiotherapist: (Egypt) Mohamed Ashraf
- Masseur: (Egypt) Mustafa Al-Sunni

=== Team ===
Squad for the 2023–24 Season.

Goalkeepers

- 72 (Egypt) Mahmoud Khalil
- 12 (Egypt) Hesham El-Sobky
- (Egypt) Ahmed Waleed

Left Wingers

- 11 (Egypt) Ahmed Moamen Safa
- 31 (Egypt) Omar Al-Wakil
- 3 (Egypt) Mazen Reda

Right Wingers

- (Egypt) Moamen Zaki
- 1 (Egypt) Akram Yosri

Line Players

- 25 (Egypt) Wisam Nawar
- 24 (Egypt) Khalid Waleed
- 77 (Egypt) Shady Khalil
- 41 (Egypt) Mohamed Tarek

Left Backs

- 44 (Egypt) Mohamed Yassin
- (Egypt) Hesham Salah
- (Egypt) Mohamed Samir

Central Backs

- 20 (Egypt) Mohamed Alaa
- 8 (Egypt) Mohamed El-Bassiouny
- (Egypt) Ahmed Sameh

Right Backs

- 66 (Egypt) Ahmed El-Ahmar (C)
- 18 (Egypt) Ahmed Hossam

== Competitions ==
=== Overview ===
Competition	First match	Last match	Starting round	Record							
Competition	First match	Last match	Starting round	Pld	W	D	L	PF	PA	PD	Win %
League	TBA		Round 1	0	0	0	0	0	0	+0	—
Cup	TBA		R 1/32	0	0	0	0	0	0	+0	—
A-Super	TBA			0	0	0	0	0	0	+0	—
Champions League	TBA		Group Stage	0	0	0	0	0	0	+0	—
Arab-CL	16 August 2023		Group Stage	6	5	0	1	210	150	+60	83.33
A-Winners' Cup	TBA		Group Stage	0	0	0	0	0	0	+0	—
Total				6	5	0	1	210	150	+60	83.33

Source: Competitions

== Arab Championship of Champions Club ==
Pos	Team	Pld	W	D	L	GF	GA	GD	Pts
1	Zamalek SC	4	3	0	1	145	99	+46	6

=== Matches ===
(Round 1)

Wednesday 16 August 2023; 01:00 CET (UTC+1)	ES Aïn Touta	28–34	Zamalek SC	Prince Nayef bin Abdulaziz City Hall, Dammam
Wednesday 16 August 2023; 01:00 CET (UTC+1)		(13–18)		Prince Nayef bin Abdulaziz City Hall, Dammam

(Round 2)

Thursday 17 August 2023; 03:00 CET (UTC+1)	Zamalek SC	32–33	Al-Arabi SC	Prince Nayef bin Abdulaziz City Hall, Dammam
Thursday 17 August 2023; 03:00 CET (UTC+1)		(18–16)		Prince Nayef bin Abdulaziz City Hall, Dammam

(Round 3)

Friday 18 August 2023; 07:00 CET (UTC+1)	Al Hada	24–28	Zamalek SC	Prince Nayef bin Abdulaziz City Hall, Dammam
Friday 18 August 2023; 07:00 CET (UTC+1)		(10–15)		Prince Nayef bin Abdulaziz City Hall, Dammam

(Round 4)

Monday 21 August 2023; 01:00 CET (UTC+1)	Zamalek SC	51–14	Al-Shula	Prince Nayef bin Abdulaziz City Hall, Dammam
Monday 21 August 2023; 01:00 CET (UTC+1)		(26–6)		Prince Nayef bin Abdulaziz City Hall, Dammam

(quarter-finals)

Wednesday 23 August 2023; 07:30 CET (UTC+1)	Zamalek SC	36–27	AL Hashd	Prince Nayef bin Abdulaziz City Hall, Dammam
Wednesday 23 August 2023; 07:30 CET (UTC+1)		(18–13)		Prince Nayef bin Abdulaziz City Hall, Dammam

(semi-finals)

Friday 25 August 2023; 07:30 CET (UTC+1)	Mudhar HC	24–29	Zamalek SC	Prince Nayef bin Abdulaziz City Hall, Dammam
Friday 25 August 2023; 07:30 CET (UTC+1)		(7–13)		Prince Nayef bin Abdulaziz City Hall, Dammam

(finals)

Sunday 27 August 2023; 07:30 CET (UTC+1)	Zamalek SC	–	Kuwait SC	Prince Nayef bin Abdulaziz City Hall, Dammam
Sunday 27 August 2023; 07:30 CET (UTC+1)		(18–16)		Prince Nayef bin Abdulaziz City Hall, Dammam

== African Champions League ==
Pos	Team	Pld	W	D	L	GF	GA	GD	Pts
1	Zamalek SC	0	0	0	0	0	0	0	0

== Egyptian League ==
=== First Stage ===
Pos	Team	Pld	W	D	L	GF	GA	GD	Pts
1	Zamalek SC	0	0	0	0	0	0	0	0

== African Cup Winners' Cup ==
Pos	Team	Pld	W	D	L	GF	GA	GD	Pts
1	Zamalek SC	0	0	0	0	0	0	0	0
