= 2019–20 Zamalek SC (handball) =

51st season in existence of Zamalek SC (handball)

Zamalek Handball Club
2019–20 season
- Head coach: (Egypt) Bassem El-Sobky
- Stadium: The Covered Hall (Abdulrahman Fawzi Hall)
Home colours	Away colours

The 2019–20 season is the 62nd season in the club history of the handball branch of Zamalek, the season began with African Handball Super Cup on 4 April 2019, as Zamalek competes for the Egyptian Handball League, Egypt Handball Cup and IHF Super Globe, African Handball Champions League.

== Competitions ==
=== Overview ===
Competition	First match	Last match	Starting round	Final position	Record							
Competition	First match	Last match	Starting round	Final position	Pld	W	D	L	PF	PA	PD	Win %
League	6 September 2019	5 March 2020	Round 1	Winners	22	20	0	2	707	570	+137	90.91
Cup	-	-	-	-	0	0	0	0	−	−	—	—
A-Super	4 April 2019	-	-	Winners	1	1	0	0	38	35	+3	100.00
Champions League	4 October 2019	13 October 2019	Group Stage	Winners	7	7	0	0	250	178	+72	100.00
S-Globe	28 August 2019	31 August 2019	Quarter Finals	5th	3	2	0	1	99	82	+17	66.67
Total					33	30	0	3	1,094	865	+229	90.91

Source: Competitions

== 2019 African Super Cup ==
The season began with the African Handball Super Cup on 4 April 2019, and ended with Zamalek achieving the African title for the 6th times in the Club History.

Thursday, 4 April 2019
19:00 CET (UTC+1)
Zamalek SC
38–35 (ET)
Al Ahly SC
Moulay Hassan, Oudja

(11–13)

FT: 27–27 ET: 4–4, 7–4

== 2019 IHF Super Globe ==
This competition was held in a knock-out format starting from the quarterfinals qualification, and 10 teams participated in this competition, Zamalek began directly from the quarterfinals.

=== Quarter-finals ===
28 August 2019; 14:30	Zamalek SC (Egypt)	28–32	(Germany) THW Kiel	Ministry of Sports Hall, Dammam; Attendance: 1,400; Referees: Gubica, Milošević (CRO)
28 August 2019; 14:30	El-Deraa, Saad 6	(12–18)	Bilyk, Ekberg 9	Ministry of Sports Hall, Dammam; Attendance: 1,400; Referees: Gubica, Milošević (CRO)
28 August 2019; 14:30	1× (yellow card) 2× (suspension)	Report	1× (yellow card)	Ministry of Sports Hall, Dammam; Attendance: 1,400; Referees: Gubica, Milošević (CRO)

=== Placement round 5–10 ===
==== Group B ====
Pos	Team	Pld	W	D	L	GF	GA	GD	Pts
1	(Egypt) Zamalek SC	2	2	0	0	71	50	+21	4
2	(Qatar) Al-Duhail SC	2	1	0	1	50	52	−2	2
3	(United States) New York City THC	2	0	0	2	43	62	−19	0

Source: IHF
Rules for classification: 1) points; 2) head-to-head points; 3) head-to-head goal difference; 4) head-to-head number of goals scored; 5) goal difference.

30 August 2019; 16:30	Zamalek SC (Egypt)	38–24	(United States) New York City THC	Ministry of Sports Hall, Dammam; Attendance: 1,200; Referees: Fonseca, Santos (POR)
30 August 2019; 16:30	El-Ahmar 7	(19–15)	Pires 8	Ministry of Sports Hall, Dammam; Attendance: 1,200; Referees: Fonseca, Santos (POR)
30 August 2019; 16:30	1× (suspension)	Report	2× (yellow card) 5× (suspension)	Ministry of Sports Hall, Dammam; Attendance: 1,200; Referees: Fonseca, Santos (POR)

31 August 2019; 12:15	Al-Duhail SC (Qatar)	26–33	(Egypt) Zamalek SC	Ministry of Sports Hall, Dammam; Referees: Schulze, Tönnies (GER)
31 August 2019; 12:15	Maaref 6	(12–15)	El-Ahmar, El-Deraa 6	Ministry of Sports Hall, Dammam; Referees: Schulze, Tönnies (GER)
31 August 2019; 12:15	6× (suspension)	Report	2× (yellow card) 3× (suspension)	Ministry of Sports Hall, Dammam; Referees: Schulze, Tönnies (GER)

== Egyptian League ==
=== First Stage ===
Pos	Team	Pld	W	D	L	GF	GA	GD	Pts
1	Zamalek SC	17	16	0	1	551	441	+110	49

=== Matches ===
(Round 1)

Friday, 6 September 2019; 18:00 CET (UTC+1)	Zamalek SC	40-29	Maadi Club	Abdulrahman Fawzi Hall, Cairo
Friday, 6 September 2019; 18:00 CET (UTC+1)		(–)		Abdulrahman Fawzi Hall, Cairo

(Round 2)

Thursday, 12 September 2019; 18:00 CET (UTC+1)	Aviation SC	21–27	Zamalek SC	Aviation Club Hall, Cairo
Thursday, 12 September 2019; 18:00 CET (UTC+1)		(–)		Aviation Club Hall, Cairo

(Round 3)

Friday, 13 September 2019; 18:00 CET (UTC+1)	Zamalek SC	30-27	Olympic SC	Abdulrahman Fawzi Hall, Cairo
Friday, 13 September 2019; 18:00 CET (UTC+1)		(–)		Abdulrahman Fawzi Hall, Cairo

(Round 4)

Thursday, 19 September 2019; 18:00 CET (UTC+1)	Zamalek SC	29–28	Heliopolis	Abdulrahman Fawzi Hall, Cairo
Thursday, 19 September 2019; 18:00 CET (UTC+1)		(–)		Abdulrahman Fawzi Hall, Cairo

(Round 5)

Friday, 20 September 2019; 18:00 CET (UTC+1)	Zamalek SC	36–29	Tala'ea El Gaish SC	Abdulrahman Fawzi Hall, Cairo
Friday, 20 September 2019; 18:00 CET (UTC+1)		(–)		Abdulrahman Fawzi Hall, Cairo

(Round 6)

Thursday, 26 September 2019; 16:00 CET (UTC+1)	Zamalek SC	37–24	Hadayek Al Ahram Club	Abdulrahman Fawzi Hall, Cairo
Thursday, 26 September 2019; 16:00 CET (UTC+1)		(–)		Abdulrahman Fawzi Hall, Cairo

(Round 7)

Friday, 27 September 2019; 18:00 CET (UTC+1)	Geziret Elward Club	26–36	Zamalek SC	Geziret Elward Hall, Mansourah
Friday, 27 September 2019; 18:00 CET (UTC+1)		(–)		Geziret Elward Hall, Mansourah

(Round 8)

Thursday, 31 October 2019; 16:00 CET (UTC+1)	Zamalek SC	38-26	Al Hiwar Club	Abdulrahman Fawzi Hall, Cairo
Thursday, 31 October 2019; 16:00 CET (UTC+1)		(–)		Abdulrahman Fawzi Hall, Cairo

(Round 9)

Friday, 1 November 2019; 18:00 CET (UTC+1)	Fayoum SC	26–34	Zamalek SC	Fayoum Club Hall, Fayoum
Friday, 1 November 2019; 18:00 CET (UTC+1)		(–)		Fayoum Club Hall, Fayoum

(Round 10)

Thursday, 7 November 2019; 18:00 CET (UTC+1)	Zamalek SC	30–25	El Zohour SC	Abdulrahman Fawzi Hall, Cairo
Thursday, 7 November 2019; 18:00 CET (UTC+1)		(–)		Abdulrahman Fawzi Hall, Cairo

(Round 11)

Friday, 8 November 2019; 16:00 CET (UTC+1)	Gezira SC	32-28	Zamalek SC	Ittihad-Elshorta Hall, Cairo
Friday, 8 November 2019; 16:00 CET (UTC+1)		(–)		Ittihad-Elshorta Hall, Cairo

(Round 12)

Thursday, 14 November 2019; 16:00 CET (UTC+1)	Zamalek SC	26–22	Smouha SC	Abdulrahman Fawzi Hall, Cairo
Thursday, 14 November 2019; 16:00 CET (UTC+1)		(–)		Abdulrahman Fawzi Hall, Cairo

(Round 13)

Friday, 15 November 2019; 16:00 CET (UTC+1)	Horses Owners Club	29-37	Zamalek SC	Delfi Hall, Cairo
Friday, 15 November 2019; 16:00 CET (UTC+1)		(–)		Delfi Hall, Cairo

(Round 14)

Thursday, 21 November 2019; 16:00 CET (UTC+1)	Bank Al Ahli	24-33	Zamalek SC	Olympic Center Hall, Alexandria
Thursday, 21 November 2019; 16:00 CET (UTC+1)		(–)		Olympic Center Hall, Alexandria

(Round 15)

Friday, 22 November 2019; 18:00 CET (UTC+1)	Zamalek SC	35–26	Sporting SC	Abdulrahman Fawzi Hall, Cairo
Friday, 22 November 2019; 18:00 CET (UTC+1)		(–)		Abdulrahman Fawzi Hall, Cairo

(Round 16)

Thursday, 28 November 2019; 18:00 CET (UTC+1)	Zamalek SC	33-27	6th October SC	Abdulrahman Fawzi Hall, Cairo
Thursday, 28 November 2019; 18:00 CET (UTC+1)		(–)		Abdulrahman Fawzi Hall, Cairo

(Round 17)

Friday, 29 November 2019; 20:00 CET (UTC+1)	Al Ahly	20–22	Zamalek SC	6th of October Sports Hall, Cairo
Friday, 29 November 2019; 20:00 CET (UTC+1)		(–)		6th of October Sports Hall, Cairo

=== Second stage ===
Pos	Team	Pld	W	D	L	GF	GA	GD	Pts
1	Zamalek SC	5	4	0	1	156	129	+27	13

=== Matches ===
(Round 1)

Thursday, 6 February 2010; 18:00 CET (UTC+1)	Zamalek SC	32–22	Smouha SC	Abdulrahman Fawzi Hall, Cairo
Thursday, 6 February 2010; 18:00 CET (UTC+1)		(–)		Abdulrahman Fawzi Hall, Cairo

(Round 2)

Thursday, 13 February 2020; 20:00 CET (UTC+1)	Heliopolis	28–30	Zamalek SC	Heliopolis Hall, Cairo
Thursday, 13 February 2020; 20:00 CET (UTC+1)		(–)		Heliopolis Hall, Cairo

(Round 3)

Friday, 21 February 2020; 18:00 CET (UTC+1)	Tala'ea El Gaish SC	27–26	Zamalek SC	Tallaa Elgish Hall, Cairo
Friday, 21 February 2020; 18:00 CET (UTC+1)		(–)		Tallaa Elgish Hall, Cairo

(Round 4)

Thursday, 27 February 2020; 18:00 CET (UTC+1)	Zamalek SC	38-25	Olympic SC	Abdulrahman Fawzi Hall, Cairo
Thursday, 27 February 2020; 18:00 CET (UTC+1)		(–)		Abdulrahman Fawzi Hall, Cairo

(Round 5)

Thursday, 5 March 2010; 16:00 CET (UTC+1)	Bank Al Ahli	27-30	Zamalek SC	Olympic Center Hall, Alexandria
Thursday, 5 March 2010; 16:00 CET (UTC+1)		(–)		Olympic Center Hall, Alexandria

=== Final Decision ===
The league was suspended on March 6, 2019, due to the outbreak of the new Corona virus, and then it was announced on May 22 that the season had been canceled with the clubs' approval.

The Board of Directors of the Egyptian Handball Federation Egyptian Handball Federation announced giving Zamalek the title, due to its position on the league table, in addition to being the champion of the previous version, on May 22, 2021.

== Egyptian Cup ==
Canceled due to COVID-19 pandemic

== African Champions League ==
Pos	Team	Pld	W	D	L	GF	GA	GD	Pts
1	Zamalek SC	4	4	0	0	152	106	+46	8

=== Matches ===
(Round 1)

Friday, 4 October 2019; 17:00 CET (UTC+1)	Zamalek SC	42–25	Desportivo da Praia	Vavá Duarte, Praia
Friday, 4 October 2019; 17:00 CET (UTC+1)		(25–10)		Vavá Duarte, Praia

(Round 2)

Saturday, 5 October 2019; 15:00 CET (UTC+1)	Zamalek SC	41–26	Étoile du Congo	Vavá Duarte, Praia
Saturday, 5 October 2019; 15:00 CET (UTC+1)		(–)		Vavá Duarte, Praia

(Round 3)

Tuesday, 8 October 2019; 15:00 CET (UTC+1)	Zamalek SC	28–23	FAP Yaoundé	Pavilhão Craveiro Lopes, Praia
Tuesday, 8 October 2019; 15:00 CET (UTC+1)		(–)		Pavilhão Craveiro Lopes, Praia

(Round 4)

Wednesday, 9 October 2019; 21:00 CET (UTC+1)	Zamalek SC	38–32	Widad Smara	Pavilhão Craveiro Lopes, Praia
Wednesday, 9 October 2019; 21:00 CET (UTC+1)		(–)		Pavilhão Craveiro Lopes, Praia

(Quarter-Finals)

Thursday, 10 October 2019; 19:00 CET (UTC+1)	Zamalek SC	35–23	Red Star OJA	Pavilhão Craveiro Lopes, Praia
Thursday, 10 October 2019; 19:00 CET (UTC+1)		(–)		Pavilhão Craveiro Lopes, Praia

(Semi-Finals)

Saturday, 12 October 2019; 19:00 CET (UTC+1)	Interclube	18–30	Zamalek SC	Vavá Duarte, Praia
Saturday, 12 October 2019; 19:00 CET (UTC+1)		(–)		Vavá Duarte, Praia

(Finals)

Sunday, 13 October 2019
21:00 CET (UTC+1)
Sporting
31–33 (ET)
Zamalek SC
Vavá Duarte, Praia

(17–14)

FT: 28–28 ET: 31–33
