= 2010 IHF Super Globe =

International Handball Competition

Tournament details
- Host country: Qatar
- Venue(s): 1 (in 1 host city)
- Dates: 17–21 May
- Teams: 6 (from 5 confederations)

Final positions
- Champions: (Spain) BM Ciudad Real (2nd title)
- Runner-up: (Qatar) Al Sadd SC
- Third place: (Egypt) Zamalek SC
- Fourth place: (Lebanon) Al Sadd HC

Tournament statistics
- Matches played: 11
- Goals scored: 587 (53.36 per match)
- Attendance: 14,000 (1,273 per match)
- Top scorer(s): (Egypt) Ahmed El-Ahmar (41 goals)

The 2010 IHF Super Globe was the fourth edition of the tournament. It was held in Doha, Qatar at Aspire Dome from May 17 to May 21.

BM Ciudad Real defeated the hosts Al Sadd SC in the final match by 30 - 25.

== Teams ==
Group A	Group B
(Spain) BM Ciudad Real (Egypt) Zamalek SC (Brazil) Unopar	(Qatar) Al Sadd SC (Lebanon) Al Sadd HC (Australia) Southern Stars

== Schedule and results ==
Legend
Qualified for the Semi finals

=== Group A ===
All kick-off times are local (UTC+03:00).

Team	Pld	W	D	L	GF	GA	GD	Pts
(Spain) Ciudad Real	2	2	0	0	68	41	+27	4
(Egypt) Zamalek SC	2	1	0	1	53	57	−4	2
(Brazil) Unopar HC	2	0	0	2	48	71	−23	0

17 May 2010; 16:45	Ciudad Real (Spain)	28 – 22	(Egypt) Zamalek SC	Aspire Dome, Doha; Attendance: 1,500; Referees: Lazzar, Reveret (France)
17 May 2010; 16:45	Petar Metličić 5	(17 – 13)	Ahmed El-Ahmar 10	Aspire Dome, Doha; Attendance: 1,500; Referees: Lazzar, Reveret (France)
17 May 2010; 16:45	3× (yellow card) 2× (suspension)	Report	3× (yellow card) 4× (suspension)	Aspire Dome, Doha; Attendance: 1,500; Referees: Lazzar, Reveret (France)

18 May 2010; 16:45	Ciudad Real (Spain)	40 – 19	(Brazil) Unopar HC	Aspire Dome, Doha; Attendance: 800; Referees: Al Suwaidi, Bamatraf (Qatar)
18 May 2010; 16:45	Parrondo 6	(21 – 8)	Renato Mazzoco 3	Aspire Dome, Doha; Attendance: 800; Referees: Al Suwaidi, Bamatraf (Qatar)
18 May 2010; 16:45	2× (yellow card) 1× (suspension)	Report	3× (yellow card) 1× (suspension)	Aspire Dome, Doha; Attendance: 800; Referees: Al Suwaidi, Bamatraf (Qatar)

19 May 2010; 16:45	Zamalek SC (Egypt)	31 – 29	(Brazil) Unopar HC	Al-Gharafa Sports Club Hall, Doha; Attendance: 1,200; Referees: Karbas Chi, Elsayed (Iran)
19 May 2010; 16:45	Ahmed El-Ahmar 10	(15 – 15)	Two players 7	Al-Gharafa Sports Club Hall, Doha; Attendance: 1,200; Referees: Karbas Chi, Elsayed (Iran)
19 May 2010; 16:45	3× (yellow card) 3× (suspension)	Report	3× (yellow card) 3× (suspension)	Al-Gharafa Sports Club Hall, Doha; Attendance: 1,200; Referees: Karbas Chi, Elsayed (Iran)

=== Group B ===
Team	Pld	W	D	L	GF	GA	GD	Pts
(Qatar) Al Sadd SC	2	2	0	0	66	35	+31	4
(Lebanon) Al Sadd HC	2	1	0	1	51	49	+2	2
(Australia) Southern Stars	2	0	0	2	35	68	−33	0

17 May 2010; 18:15	Al Sadd SC (Qatar)	30 – 19	(Lebanon) Al Sadd HC	Aspire Dome, Doha; Attendance: 800; Referees: Karbas Chi, Elsayed (Iran)
17 May 2010; 18:15	Kiril Lazarov 12	(15 – 10)	Zoran Roganović 6	Aspire Dome, Doha; Attendance: 800; Referees: Karbas Chi, Elsayed (Iran)
17 May 2010; 18:15	3× (yellow card) 3× (suspension)	Report	2× (yellow card) 3× (suspension)	Aspire Dome, Doha; Attendance: 800; Referees: Karbas Chi, Elsayed (Iran)

18 May 2010; 18:15	Al Sadd SC (Qatar)	36 – 16	(Australia) Southern Stars	Aspire Dome, Doha; Attendance: 1,000; Referees: Coulibaly, Diabate (Ivory Coast)
18 May 2010; 18:15	Marko Abdelrazek 10	(16 – 8)	Two players 4	Aspire Dome, Doha; Attendance: 1,000; Referees: Coulibaly, Diabate (Ivory Coast)
18 May 2010; 18:15	3× (yellow card) 1× (suspension)	Report	3× (yellow card) 3× (suspension)	Aspire Dome, Doha; Attendance: 1,000; Referees: Coulibaly, Diabate (Ivory Coast)

19 May 2010; 18:15	Al Sadd HC (Lebanon)	32 – 19	(Australia) Southern Stars	Aspire Dome, Doha; Attendance: 1,000; Referees: Al Suwaidi, Bamatraf (Qatar)
19 May 2010; 18:15	Petar Kapisoda 5	(16 – 7)	Kenneth Toerlen 8	Aspire Dome, Doha; Attendance: 1,000; Referees: Al Suwaidi, Bamatraf (Qatar)
19 May 2010; 18:15	3× (yellow card) 4× (suspension)	Report	3× (yellow card) 6× (suspension)	Aspire Dome, Doha; Attendance: 1,000; Referees: Al Suwaidi, Bamatraf (Qatar)

=== Championship bracket ===
Semi-finals
20 May
(Spain) BM Ciudad Real	41
(Lebanon) Al Sadd HC	18
20 May
(Qatar) Al Sadd SC	27
(Egypt) Zamalek SC	23

Final
21 May
(Spain) BM Ciudad Real	30
(Qatar) Al Sadd SC	25
Third place
21 May
(Egypt) Zamalek SC	33
(Lebanon) Al Sadd HC	22

==== Semifinals ====
May 20, 2010; 16:45	Ciudad Real (Spain)	41 – 18	(Lebanon) Al Sadd HC	Aspire Dome, Doha; Attendance: 900; Referees: Coulibaly, Diabate (Ivory Coast)
May 20, 2010; 16:45	Two players 8	(21 – 8)	Denis Špoljarić 7	Aspire Dome, Doha; Attendance: 900; Referees: Coulibaly, Diabate (Ivory Coast)
May 20, 2010; 16:45	3× (yellow card) 1× (suspension)	Report	2× (yellow card) 1× (suspension)	Aspire Dome, Doha; Attendance: 900; Referees: Coulibaly, Diabate (Ivory Coast)

May 20, 2010; 18:45	Al Sadd SC (Qatar)	27 – 23	(Egypt) Zamalek SC	Aspire Dome, Doha; Attendance: 2,500; Referees: Lazzar, Reveret (France)
May 20, 2010; 18:45	Kiril Lazarov 12	(13 – 12)	Ahmed El-Ahmar 8	Aspire Dome, Doha; Attendance: 2,500; Referees: Lazzar, Reveret (France)
May 20, 2010; 18:45	3× (yellow card) 7× (suspension)	Report	3× (yellow card) 5× (suspension)	Aspire Dome, Doha; Attendance: 2,500; Referees: Lazzar, Reveret (France)

=== Fifth place game ===
May 21, 2010; 15:15	Unopar HC (Brazil)	31 – 16	(Australia) Southern Stars	Aspire Dome, Doha; Referees: Al Suwaidi, Bamatraf (Qatar)
May 21, 2010; 15:15	Three players 5	(16 – 8)	Kenneth Toerlen 6	Aspire Dome, Doha; Referees: Al Suwaidi, Bamatraf (Qatar)
May 21, 2010; 15:15	2× (yellow card) 1× (suspension)	Report	3× (yellow card) 2× (suspension) 1× (red card)	Aspire Dome, Doha; Referees: Al Suwaidi, Bamatraf (Qatar)

=== Bronze Medal ===
May 21, 2010; 17:15	Al Sadd HC (Lebanon)	22 – 33	(Egypt) Zamalek SC	Aspire Dome, Doha; Attendance: 1,800; Referees: Karbas Chi, Elsayed (Iran)
May 21, 2010; 17:15	Petar Kapisoda 6	(8 – 12)	Ahmed El-Ahmar 13	Aspire Dome, Doha; Attendance: 1,800; Referees: Karbas Chi, Elsayed (Iran)
May 21, 2010; 17:15	3× (yellow card) 6× (suspension)	Report	3× (yellow card) 5× (suspension)	Aspire Dome, Doha; Attendance: 1,800; Referees: Karbas Chi, Elsayed (Iran)

=== Gold Medal ===
May 21, 2010; 20:15	BM Ciudad Real (Spain)	30 – 25	(Qatar) Al Sadd SC	Aspire Dome, Doha; Attendance: 2,500; Referees: Lazzar, Reveret (France)
May 21, 2010; 20:15	Two players 7	(15 – 11)	Kiril Lazarov 12	Aspire Dome, Doha; Attendance: 2,500; Referees: Lazzar, Reveret (France)
May 21, 2010; 20:15	5× (yellow card) 5× (suspension)	Report	4× (yellow card) 5× (suspension)	Aspire Dome, Doha; Attendance: 2,500; Referees: Lazzar, Reveret (France)
