= 2011 IHF Super Globe =

Tournament details
- Host country: Qatar
- Venue(s): 1 (in 1 host city)
- Dates: 14–18 May
- Teams: 8 (from 5 confederations)

Final positions
- Champions: (Germany) THW Kiel (1st title)
- Runner-up: (Spain) BM Ciudad Real
- Third place: (Lebanon) Al Sadd
- Fourth place: (Egypt) Zamalek SC

Tournament statistics
- Matches played: 16
- Goals scored: 989 (61.81 per match)
- Top scorer(s): (Egypt) Ahmed El-Ahmar (37 goals)

2011 IHF Super Globe was the IHF Men's Super Globe 5th edition. It was held in Doha, Qatar at Al-Gharafa Sports Club Hall.

The teams that take part will be the respective continental champions.

== Teams ==
Group A	Group B
(Germany) THW Kiel (Qatar) Al Rayyan (Lebanon) As-Sadd (Brazil) EC Pinheiros	(Spain) BM Ciudad Real (Qatar) Al-Sadd (Egypt) Zamalek SC (Australia) Southern Stars

== Schedule and results ==
Legend
Qualified for the final

=== Group A ===
All kick-off times are local (UTC+03:00).

Team	Pld	W	D	L	GF	GA	GD	Pts
(Germany) THW Kiel	3	3	0	0	119	77	+42	6
(Lebanon) As-Sadd	3	2	0	1	77	97	−20	4
(Brazil) Pinheiros	3	0	1	2	85	94	−9	1
(Qatar) Al-Rayyan	3	0	1	2	87	100	−13	1

14 May 2011; 15:30	THW Kiel (Germany)	42–18	(Lebanon) As-Sadd	Al-Gharafa Sports Club Hall; Referees: Krstić, Ljubić (SRB)
14 May 2011; 15:30	Christian Sprenger 9	(12–8)	Khoder Nahas 9	Al-Gharafa Sports Club Hall; Referees: Krstić, Ljubić (SRB)
14 May 2011; 15:30	3× (yellow card) 1× (suspension)	Report	3× (yellow card) 3× (suspension)	Al-Gharafa Sports Club Hall; Referees: Krstić, Ljubić (SRB)

14 May 2011; 20:30	Al-Rayyan (Qatar)	29–29	(Brazil) Pinheiros	Al-Gharafa Sports Club Hall; Referees: Al Nuaimi, Al Marzouqi (UAE)
14 May 2011; 20:30	Dragan Gajić 7	(12–18)	Two player 6	Al-Gharafa Sports Club Hall; Referees: Al Nuaimi, Al Marzouqi (UAE)
14 May 2011; 20:30	3× (yellow card) 2× (suspension) 1× (red card)	Report	3× (yellow card) 1× (suspension)	Al-Gharafa Sports Club Hall; Referees: Al Nuaimi, Al Marzouqi (UAE)

15 May 2011; 14:00	Pinheiros (Brazil)	29–36	(Germany) THW Kiel	Al-Gharafa Sports Club Hall; Referees: Al-Suwaidi, Bamatref (QAT)
15 May 2011; 14:00	Two players 5	(14–21)	Kim Andersson 7	Al-Gharafa Sports Club Hall; Referees: Al-Suwaidi, Bamatref (QAT)
15 May 2011; 14:00	4× (yellow card) 2× (suspension)	Report	3× (yellow card) 2× (suspension)	Al-Gharafa Sports Club Hall; Referees: Al-Suwaidi, Bamatref (QAT)

15 May 2011; 20:00	As-Sadd (Lebanon)	30–28	(Qatar) Al-Rayyan	Al-Gharafa Sports Club Hall; Referees: Abrahamsen, Abrahamsen (NOR)
15 May 2011; 20:00	Two players 8	(14–14)	Manuel Štrlek 8	Al-Gharafa Sports Club Hall; Referees: Abrahamsen, Abrahamsen (NOR)
15 May 2011; 20:00	2× (yellow card) 2× (suspension)	Report	3× (yellow card) 3× (suspension)	Al-Gharafa Sports Club Hall; Referees: Abrahamsen, Abrahamsen (NOR)

16 May 2011; 14:00	As-Sadd (Lebanon)	29–27	(Brazil) Pinheiros	Al-Gharafa Sports Club Hall; Referees: Al Nuaimi, Al Marzouqi (UAE)
16 May 2011; 14:00	Eduardo Gurbindo 9	(12–13)	Two players 6	Al-Gharafa Sports Club Hall; Referees: Al Nuaimi, Al Marzouqi (UAE)
16 May 2011; 14:00	3× (yellow card) 5× (suspension)	Report	3× (yellow card) 3× (suspension)	Al-Gharafa Sports Club Hall; Referees: Al Nuaimi, Al Marzouqi (UAE)

16 May 2011; 18:00	THW Kiel (Germany)	41–30	(Qatar) Al-Rayyan	Al-Gharafa Sports Club Hall; Referees: Krichen, Makhlouf (TUN)
16 May 2011; 18:00	Momir Ilić 9	(19–15)	Two players 6	Al-Gharafa Sports Club Hall; Referees: Krichen, Makhlouf (TUN)
16 May 2011; 18:00	3× (yellow card)	Report	3× (yellow card) 2× (suspension)	Al-Gharafa Sports Club Hall; Referees: Krichen, Makhlouf (TUN)

=== Group B ===
All kick-off times are local (UTC+03:00).

Team	Pld	W	D	L	GF	GA	GD	Pts
(Spain) Ciudad Real	3	3	0	0	111	70	+41	6
(Egypt) Zamalek SC	3	1	1	1	103	93	+10	3
(Qatar) Al-Sadd	3	1	1	1	104	97	+7	3
(Australia) Southern Stars	3	0	0	3	67	125	−58	0

14 May 2011; 13:30	Ciudad Real (Spain)	33–25	(Egypt) Zamalek SC	Al-Gharafa Sports Club Hall

14 May 2011; 18:30	Al-Sadd (Qatar)	39–27	(Australia) Southern Stars	Al-Gharafa Sports Club Hall

15 May 2011; 16:00	Southern Stars (Australia)	17–45	(Spain) Ciudad Real	Al-Gharafa Sports Club Hall

15 May 2011; 18:00	Zamalek SC (Egypt)	37–37	(Qatar) Al-Sadd	Al-Gharafa Sports Club Hall

16 May 2011; 16:00	Zamalek SC (Egypt)	41–23	(Australia) Southern Stars	Al-Gharafa Sports Club Hall

16 May 2011; 20:00	Ciudad Real (Spain)	33–28	(Qatar) Al-Sadd	Al-Gharafa Sports Club Hall

== Seventh Place ==
18 May 2011; 13:00	Al Rayyan (Qatar)	36–21	(Australia) Southern Stars	Al-Gharafa Sports Club Hall
18 May 2011; 13:00		(17–7)		Al-Gharafa Sports Club Hall

== Fifth place ==
18 May 2011; 15:00	Al-Sadd (Qatar)	36–39	(Brazil) EC Pinheiros	Al-Gharafa Sports Club Hall
18 May 2011; 15:00		(18–25)		Al-Gharafa Sports Club Hall

== Bronze Medal ==
18 May 2011; 17:00	Zamalek SC (Egypt)	23–28	(Lebanon) As-Sadd	Al-Gharafa Sports Club Hall
18 May 2011; 17:00		(10–13)		Al-Gharafa Sports Club Hall

== Gold-medal match ==
18 May 2011; 19:00	BM Ciudad Real (Spain)	25–28	(Germany) THW Kiel	Al-Gharafa Sports Club Hall
18 May 2011; 19:00		(14–10)		Al-Gharafa Sports Club Hall
