= Magdy Abou El-Magd =

Egyptian handball player

Personal information
- Nationality: Egyptian
- Born: 15 October 1972 (age 52)
- Height: 1.88 m (6 ft 2 in)
- Weight: 85 kg (187 lb)

Sport
- Sport: Handball

Magdy Ahmad Abou El-Magd (born 15 October 1972) is an Egyptian handball player. He competed in the 2000 Summer Olympics.
