= Egyptian Professional Super Cup =

Professional handball league in Egypt

Egyptian Handball Professional Super Cup
- Founded: 2019; 7 years ago
- Country: Egypt
- Confederation: EHF
- Most recent champion: Zamalek SC (1st title)
- Most titles: Zamalek SC; Sporting (1 title each)
- Broadcaster: OnTime Sports
- 2021-22

Egyptian Handball Professional Super Cup is an annual super cup competition for Egypt handball teams. Organized by the Egyptian Handball Federation, it was originally known as the Egyptian Professional Super Cup. It was the Fourth nationwide handball competition played in Egypt, with the first competition in 2019.

== Titles by club ==
Club	Titles	Years
Sporting	1	2019
Zamalek SC	1	2022

== Winners by year ==
- The complete list of the Egyptian cup winners since 2019:

- 2019 : Sporting (1)
- 2022 : Zamalek SC (1)
