= Zamalek SC Handball =

Handball club in Giza, Egypt

Zamalek HC
- Full name: Zamalek Sporting Club Handball
- Short name: ZSC, Zamalek SC
- Founded: 1961; 65 years ago
- Arena: Abdulrahman Fawzi Hall
- Capacity: 4,000
- President: Hussein Labib
- Head coach: Magdy Abou El-Magd
- Captain: Ahmed El-Ahmar
- League: Egyptian Handball League
- 2025–26: 2nd place, silver medalist(s)
- Club colours
Home	Away

Zamalek Handball Club (Arabic: نادي الزمالك لكرة اليد), also called "Commandoz" (Arabic: الكوماندوز) commonly known as Zamalek H.C, or simply as Zamalek SC, is an Egyptian handball team based in Giza, Egypt. It is a part of the Zamalek SC multi sports club, and was founded on 1961. The club competes domestically in the Egyptian League and in the African Champions League It is the most successful handball club in Egypt and Africa with a record number of domestic and international titles.

Zamalek handball team can be considered the greatest team in Africa and the Middle East. one of the league's original teams, Zamalek play their home games at Abdulrahman Fawzi Hall. They play in the Egyptian Handball League without interruption since 1976. Zamalek is the most titled club in the Egyptian Handball Competitions with 46 titles. Also, the team has participated in African Champions League since 1979 and achieved the title 12 times. Zamalek has participated in IHF Super Globe 5 times in 2010, 2011, 2012, 2019, 2021 and Withdraw once in 2018. the team was qualified in 2002 but the CAHB decided qualify Fap Yaounde.

Zamalek is the 1st champion of the African Champions League in its first edition, which began in 1979, 1st Champion of the African Cup Winners' Cup in its first edition, which began in 1985, 1st Egyptian team to win the African Super Cup in 2002, 1st Champion of the Egyptian Cup in its first edition, which began in 1979, Most African teams qualified to in the IHF Super Globe, Only team to win all local championships, league and Cup, Super Cup, Pro Super Cup, Excellence Cup, and league championship without international players. Most successful team in the Egyptian Cup with 16 titles, Most successful team in the Egyptian Super Cup, Most successful team in the Egyptian Cup of Excellence, Achieved a record by winning 6 titles in one season in 2002, 1st Team to retain the African Cup forever after winning it 1979, 1980, 1981. retain Another the African Cup forever after winning it in 2017, 2018, and 2019. It is the most successful team in the African Champions League, 1st Egyptian team to win a continental handball championship, 1st Egyptian and Arab team to win a continental championship in hall games, Most handball team in Africa and the world to achieve continental titles in the 21st century with 18 continental titles. Most Egyptians team in all other games (Football-Basketball-Handball-Volleyball) achieve continental titles with 26 continental titles.

Zamalek is the first team in the world who won Triple, three trophies in a single season, 1978–79. Zamalek is the only African sports club to have become the African champions in both football and handball in the same season, 1986, 2002. Zamalek is the only Egyptian team that achieved 3 African trophies in the same season. 2nd African team that won the Champions League and Winner's Cup in the same season. 3rd Most titled club in the world with international trophies with 26 titles, Ahead of famous German clubs. Zamalek also had a local record by achieving a record of 85 consecutive wins without defeat from 2006–07 to 2009–10.

== History ==
=== Beginnings: 1958–1961 ===
The handball journey in Zamalek SC started in 1958. At that time, handball was not a popular sport in Egypt as it is now. The credit for the popularity of handball in Egypt goes to Dr. Mohamed Fadali, one of the legends of Zamalek SC, who introduced the game of handball for the first time in the programs of the Higher Institute of Physical Education for teachers in Cairo in 1938 and issued many publications explaining the basic principles of the game, its laws, and rules of practice. He was also the founder of the Egyptian, Arab and African handball federations and the first president of the Egyptian Handball Federation. Zamalek participated in the Giza region league and the first edition of the Republic Championship in 1958, which has now become the Egyptian Handball League. With coach Hanafi Nassar, who was the first coach of Zamalek handball in 1958, for the men's team, the women's team and the junior team at the same time, and a group of young players, Zamalek aspired to create a generation that would participate and dominate local and continental championships in the future, the building of a strong team began in the 1960s by buying players from other clubs and relying on the club's youth system.

=== First achievement: 1962–1976 ===
Hanafi Nassar had his beginnings in sports when he was a football player in the Khedive School as a goalkeeper. He was a personal friend of Alaa Al-Hamouli, one of the legends of Zamalek SC, who helped him play football at Zamalek in 1952, Hanafi Nassar played under-18s football in the juniors team and played many times in friendly matches, and was a reserve for Zamalek goalkeeper, at that time, Aldo Stella, but he did not continue the practice of football because of his love for handball and his attachment to it and his influence on it. The credit goes to the founder of handball in Egypt, Dr. Mohamed Fadali, who in 1957 played a handball game in Zamalek, but he did not continue to play handball. As he made his biggest achievements in what he did after that in the field of training and him building generations of handball players and spreading the game of handball in Egypt. Due to his love, passion for coaching in which he excelled, it made him the pioneer of this game in Egypt. He used to go to different places to discover talented players in order to form strong teams for Zamalek handball. 1962–63 season, Zamalek won the first handball championship in the history of the club, Zamalek won the Giza region league for men, juniors, and women in the same season with coach Hanafi Nassar, who became the first coach to win a title with Zamalek handball teams, the men first team, women first team and the junior team. The first generation of the men's first handball team at Zamalek SC: Farouk Abdel-Gawad, Talaat Farid, Muhammad Wafiq, Mahmoud Khairat, Ahmed Askar, Hamid Mujib Abu Hadid, Mohamed Seoudi, Namiq Jaafar, Abdo Farag, Hanafi Riyad, Medhat Al-Masry, Mohamed Afifi, Nabil Sobhi, Khaled Khattab, Saif Farajallah, Sayed Abdel-Aal, Mustafa Al-Duwaini, Hamdi Al-Sayed, Mounir Gerges, Abdel-Moati Youssef. The first generation of the women's handball team at Zamalek SC: Samira Burhan, Amal Al-Fayoumi, Mona Gabr, Hikmat Daoud, Magda Qassem, Azza Nassef, Khadija Nassir, Suhair Saleh, Hana Ibrahim, Tayseer Mustafa, Nadia Samir. Hanafi Nassar would also pay with his own money when needed to form strong teams for Zamalek. 1st Egyptian Handball League title in the club's history in 1976–77 season, Zamalek won the league and the 1st Domestic Competitions in the history of the club, with coach Mohamed Tawfiq Al-Welily and the league's top scorer Gamal Hussein, who scored 113 goals.

=== Triple crown: 1979 ===
1978–79 season, in which Zamalek won 3 titles, the treble, that Zamalek achieved by winning the Egyptian League, Egyptian Cup in the 1st edition, and the African Champions League in the 1st edition. Zamalek became the 1st team to win three titles in one season, Zamalek players and administrators who achieved the triple, Alaa Salah, Hassan Sakr, Saad Selim, Ismail Mohamed Ali, Mansour Sadek, Medhat El-Beltagy, Tarek Anis; the administrators: Saeed Abdel Razzaq, Dr. Abdullah George Saad, Dr. Jamal Hamadeh, Ayoub Debes, Ezz El Matarawy, Osama Gomaa, Tariq Jibril, Mamdouh Hashem, Hussein Labib. Zamalek under the technical leadership of coach Dr. Kamal Darwish became the 1st club ever to win the Egypt Handball Cup and the African Handball Champions League, and won the 2nd Egyptian Handball League title in the club's history, Kamal Darwish became the 1st Egyptian and African coach to win 3 titles in one season.

=== Golden era: 1980s ===
From 1979 to the 1980s was the first golden era of Zamalek in handball, Kamal Darwish continued to lead Zamalek towards continental and local titles. 1979–80 season, Zamalek won the Egyptian Handball Cup title for the 2nd time in a row, and the African Handball Champions League for the 2nd time in a row, after winning the final match against Nadit Alger. In the 1980–81 season, Zamalek won the 3rd African Handball Champions League title in a row, after winning the final match against ASC Diaraf. After winning the African Handball Champions League in 1981, Zamalek retained the championship cup for life, after winning it three times in a row in 1979, 1980, and 1981, in that season, with coach Kamal Darwish as well, Zamalek repeated the feat of the 1978–79 season and for the 2nd time won three titles in one season, Egyptian Handball League for the 3rd time in the club's history, the Egypt Handball Cup for the 3rd time in the club's history, and the African Handball Champions League, with Dr. Kamal Darwish as coach: Esmat Saudi, Hossam Haroun, Hussein Labib, Tariq Anis, Abdel Rahman Al-Bohy, Tariq Jibril, Hassan Saqr, Mustafa al-Ahmar, Saad Selim, Ayoub Debes, Alaa Nasser, Kamal Abdel Razek. 1982 to 1986 the golden era of Zamalek in handball continued. Zamalek started to dominate the local championships, from 1982–83 to the 1985–86 season, Zamalek won 7 championships, 5 local championships, and 2 continental championships. In this period, Zamalek won 2 Egyptian Handball League titles in 1982–83, 1984–85, winning a total of 5 Egyptian Handball League titles in the history of the club, and 3 Egypt Handball Cup titles in 1982, 1983 and 1986, becoming the most successful club in the Egyptian Handball Cup with 6 titles. In 1985, Zamalek won the African Handball Cup Winners' Cup in the 1st edition after defeating Al Ahly in the final, raising the total number of continental championships to 4. In 1986, Zamalek won the African Handball Champions League for the 4th time, after winning the final match against Inter Club Brazzaville. Zamalek ended the 1980s era achieving a total of 12 titles in it, 3 Egyptian Handball League titles, 5 Egypt Handball Cup titles, 4 African Champions League titles, and 1 African Handball Cup Winners’ Cup title, this generation of players and this era is considered the golden era in the history of Zamalek handball and the history of Egyptian and African handball. Zamalek were African champions for 5 times out of 10 participants in the Confederation of African Handball (CAHB). Zamalek Handball players in the 1980s and some of them were honored and awarded the Sports Order of the Republic by the President of Egypt, at the time Muhammad Anwar El-Sadat. To make the Zamalek fans proud of their players, who their made history in Arab and African handball.

=== Best Egyptian Club in the 20th Century: 1990s ===
Zamalek won 11 titles From 1990 to 1999, 5 Egyptian League titles, 4 Egyptian Cup titles, 1 African Champions League title, and 1 Arab Championship of Champions title. this era, Zamalek went through a change of players and some players retired, this went on until Zamalek passed the formation of a new team of young players such as. Hossam Gharib, Ayman Salah, Ahmed Debes, Ahmed Al-Attar, Mahmoud Hussein, Hamada Al-Rubi, Ahmed Ramadan, Hussein Zaky, Hassan Yousry. in the 1990–91 Zamalek succeeded in winning the African Champions League in 1991 for the 5th time, and achieved the historic treble for the 3rd time, by winning the Egyptian League for the 7th time and the Egyptian Cup for the 7th time. Zamalek defended their title to win the Egyptian Cup in 1992 for the 8th time. Then Zamalek succeeded in winning the Egyptian League twice in a row in the 1994–95 and 1995–96, as well as the Egypt Cup in 1994. Zamalek would win their 1st title in Arab Championship of Champions 1999, after winning the final match against Al-Ahly. In the same season, Zamalek succeeded in winning the Egyptian League for the 10th time, and the Egyptian Cup for the 10th time.

=== Greatest African Team of the 21st Century: 2000–2004 ===
Zamalek won 12 titles From 2000 to 2004, 2 Egyptian Handball League titles, 3 Egypt Handball Cup titles, 2 African Handball Champions League, 1 African Handball Super Cup, 3 Egyptian Excellence Cup, 1 National Local League, With the remnants of the previous generation of Zamalek players in the 1990s and the rising generation with strength, Zamalek dominated locally and continentally all titles. In addition to qualifying for the 1st time in the club's history to the IHF Super Globe 2010, And winning the 1st African Super Cup 2002, Zamalek began the 21st century, by obtaining the historic triple titles by winning the Egyptian Handball League for the 11 times, Egypt Handball Cup for the 11th times, and the African Handball Champions League 2001 for the 6 times, after winning the final match against Niger United, in the same season Zamalek won the friendly Egyptian Excellence Cup for the 1st time, Zamalek succeeded in maintaining the Egyptian Cup for the 12th times, and the African Handball Champions League in 2002 for the 7th times, after winning the final match against Sporting Clube de Luanda, In addition to winning the Friendly Egyptian Excellence Cup for the 2nd time in a row. Zamalek had a date to win a new title and win it for the first time in the club's history and this time was with the African Handball Super Cup in 2002, when Zamalek succeeded in winning against Club Africain, Zamalek wins again for the third time in a row the Friendly Egyptian Excellence Cup and the National Local League Championship in the 2002, Zamalek returns again in 2004 and won the Egyptian Handball League for the 12th times and Egyptian Cup for the 13th times.

=== Historic bronze: 2005–2010 ===
Zamalek won 10 titles From 2005 to 2010, two Egyptian Handball League, two Egypt Handball Cup, two African Handball Cup Winners' Cup, one African Handball Super Cup, three Egyptian Handball Super Cup. From here, the black decade begins in the history of the Zamalek club, which affected all sports in the club due to the many administrative problems and the dissolution of the Zamalek club's board of directors more than once and the appointment of temporary committees to manage the club, Zamalek wins over the administrative conditions and wins the Egyptian Super Cup for handball for the first time in 2005. In 2006 Zamalek won the Egyptian Handball Cup for the 14th time and the Egyptian Super Cup for handball for the second time in a row. In 2007 Zamalek won the Egyptian Super Cup for handball for the third time in a row, Zamalek winning the Egyptian Handball League for the 13th time in 2008 and the Egypt Handball Cup for the 15th time. In 2009 Zamalek succeeded in returning and winning the continental titles after an absence of seven years, and this time winning the African Handball Cup Winners' Cup for the 2nd time, after winning the final match against Minuh Yaoundé. In the 2010 season, Zamalek won the Egyptian Handball League for the 14th time and the African Handball Cup Winners' Cup for the 3rd time, after winning the final match against G.D. Interclub, and the African Super Cup for handball for the second time, after winning against GS Pétroliers. and qualify for the IHF Super Globe for the 1st time. and achieved 3rd place and a bronze medal, in a historic achievement for the club so far.

=== Crisis: 2011–2014 ===
Zamalek won 4 titles From 2011 to 2014, Zamalek club went through a difficult stage for the club in all games due to administrative problems and others, and this led to the decline and poor results in all games except for handball, which dominated the African championships and won the three titles organized by the Confederation of African Handball, Zamalek succeeded in winning the African Handball Champions League for the 8th times in the club’s history after an absence of 9 years, the African Handball Cup Winners’ Cup for the 4th times, And the African Handball Super Cup for the 3rd times, The team also succeeded in winning the African Handball Super Cup in 2012 for the 4th times in the club history. The team succeeded in achieving 4th place twice in the IHF Super Globe 2011 and 2012.

=== Return the Commandos: 2015 ===
Administrative problems in Zamalek Club led to a decline in the levels of all collective teams from 2011 to 2014, but the handball team in Zamalek Club was the only team in the club that Achieved championships, whether Domestic and African Competitions, until 2013 when Zamalek players decided to leave the team due to problems with The club’s management and financial problems that led to the Leave of most of the first-team players for handball, and Zamalek became one of the Most Crowned Egyptian Teams in the African Titles to the Team Competing to Avoid Relegation and this is what happened in 2013 when the team was competing to Stay in the First Division League with a Group of Youth Players. Youth Zamalek players succeeded in maintaining the name of the Zamalek club by staying in the Egyptian Handball League, In 2015, with a new administration that assumed the responsibility of managing the Zamalek, the board of directors decided at the time to return all Zamalek players to return again to their club and return the Zamalek club again to the Local and Continental Titles. Indeed, with the determination of the commandos, Zamalek succeeded in winning the African Handball Champions League 2015 and for the 9th time in the club’s history and they write a history of Loyalty to the Zamalek.

=== History of success: 2015–2021 ===
Zamalek won 16 different championships From 2015 Until 2021, 4 African Handball Champions Leagues, 4 Egyptian Handball League titles, 1 Egypt Handball Cup, 1 African Handball Cup Winners’ Cup, and 3 African Handball Super Cup. And 3 titles in friendly tournaments, including 2 titles in the Sharjah International Handball Friendly Championship and 1 title in the Luxembourg International Handball Friendly Championship. Since the dismantling of the Zamalek handball team in 2012, everyone thought that the team was finished, but it returned with a strong season 2015/2016 until 2021 so Zamalek achieved 16 different championships, including 8 continental championships. The team got 5th place twice in IHF Super Globe 2019 and 2021. And won the Award for the highest scoring team in IHF Super Globe 2021, Zamalek succeeded in winning the last three titles of the Egyptian Handball League from 2019 to 2021, winning the last three titles of the African Handball Champions League from 2017 to 2019, and winning the last three titles of the African Handball Super Cup from 2018 to 2021 to be this golden generation for the Zamalek Handball Club.

=== Twenty-fifth titles: 2022 ===
After winning the Egyptian League title for the 4th time in a row and the 19th in the club’s history, and achieving a record that has not been achieved since 1966, to be the 2nd team to win the league title for four consecutive times. Zamalek also succeeded in achieving the Professional Super Cup title for the 1st time in the club’s history, in the second edition For the new competition of the Egyptian Handball Federation, Zamalek succeeded in obtaining the 25 international titles in the club’s history after winning the African Cup winners Cup for the 6th time and reducing the difference with the Algerian Groupement Sportif des Pétroliers, which was crowned with 9 Cup Winners’ Cup titles. Zamalek became the most Egyptian team in all sports win a continental titles in (Football–Handball–Volleyball–Basketball), and also succeeded in Reducing the difference with the Groupement Sportif des Pétroliers to 4 titles in the struggle of the most titled clubs with international trophies in handball.

== Crest and colors ==
1958 – Present

Logo a mixture of the sporting model and the ancient Egyptian civilization. The logo's main colors express peace and struggle and have not changed since its establishment. The home jersey uses the original Zamalek colours, In the upper half of the logo, the arrow that points towards the target appears in a pharaonic uniform as an indication of the common goal between it and Zamalek, Zamalek is famous for the stability of its basic colors, which have not changed throughout the club's history, which extends since 1911, as it is distinguished by the white kits with two parallel red lines in the middle. The team shirt is displayed on the chest, and the color symbolizes.

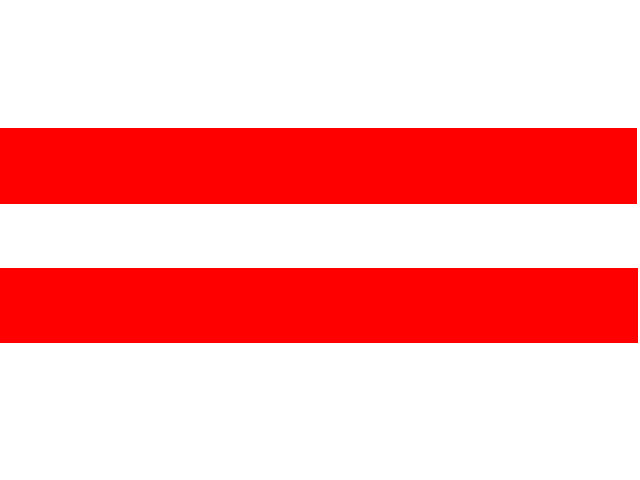

== Hall of Fame ==
- Hussein Zaky Top Scorer in 1997 IHF Junior World Handball Championship. Best Player in 1999 IHF Junior World Handball Championship. Best Centre Back & All-Star team in 2001 IHF Men's World Handball Championship. 2nd Top Scorer in 2003 IHF Men's World Handball Championship. 10th Top Scorer in 2009 IHF Men's World Handball Championship. 8th Top Scorer in 2000 Handball Summer Olympics. Best Player in 2002 IHF Super Globe. 2nd All-Time Top Scorer for the Egyptian National Handball team in IHF Men's World Handball Championship. 2nd All-Time Top Scorer for the Egyptian National Handball team in Summer Olympics. Top Scorer in 2004 Copa ASOBAL. 1st Egyptian Player to win a Championship in the EHF Competitions & 1st Egyptian Player to play in the EHF Champions League final. 3rd Top Scorer in 2005 Liga ASOBAL. Top 10 players in Liga ASOBAL. 2nd Best African Scorer in the History of IHF World Cups. 2nd Best Handball Scorer of the Egyptian National Team Throughout History. 2nd Best African Handball Scorer throughout History. Top Scorer in Liga ASOBAL 2004. 11th in the IHF World Player of the Year. 7th in the IHF World Player of the Year. Best Egyptian Scorer in the EHF Champions League. Best Egyptian Scorer in the EHF Cup. European Record for the top scorer in one Match at the EHF Supercup. Winner of Three Consecutive Olympic Awards and winner of seven consecutive IHF World Championships.
- Ahmed El Ahmar All-Time Top Scorer of the African Handball Nations Championship. Best Player in 2004 African Handball Championship, 2008 African Handball Championship, 2010 African Handball Championship, 2016 African Handball Championship. Top Scorer in 2008 African Handball Championship, 2016 African Handball Championship. 6th Scorer in 2013 IHF Men's World Handball Championship. 8th Scorer in 2020 Handball Summer Olympics. 1st All-Time Top Scorer for the Egyptian National Handball team in IHF Men's World Handball Championship. 1st Best African Handball Scorer throughout History. 1st All-Time Top Scorer for the Egyptian National Handball team in Summer Olympics. 1st All-Time Top Scorer for the IHF Super Globe. Top Scorer in 2010 IHF Super Globe, 2011 IHF Super Globe. 5th All-Time Top Scorer in IHF Men's World Handball Championship. 8th in the List of handballers with 1000 or more international goals. Best Player in 2013 Asian Handball Champions League, 2014 Asian Handball Champions League. Top Scorer in 2014 Qatar Handball League. Best Player in 2011 Arab Championship. Most Player in the world to win continental championships and Most Player in the world to win continental championships with one team. The historical Top Scorer for Zamalek handball club and the Egyptian National team at all the time.

== Home arena ==
Location	Arena's name	Period
Giza	Abdulrahman Fawzi Hall	1986 – Present

When Zamalek SC began to create the teams of Handball, Basketball and Volleyball, they saw the importance to build an arena to host the home matches of these teams. They first began to make the designs in 1970s, later they began working to build the covered hall, which was established in 1986, which they named of Abdulrahman Fawzi Hall, in the honour of one of the legend of Zamalek SC, he was the first ever Arab and African footballer to score at the FIFA World Cup, when he scored twice for Egypt in their 4–2 loss against Hungary in 1934, he is also Egypt's top goalscorer at the FIFA World Cup.

The opening ceremony of Abdulrahman Fawzi Hall was held with the opening ceremony of the 5th Arab Volleyball Championship in 1986, which was won by Zamalek volleyball team for the first time in the club's history, defeating MC Alger in the final which was held in Abdulrahman Fawzi Hall.

== Most titled clubs with international trophies ==
Zamalek is a sports club and a pioneer in various sports fields, not only in Egypt, but in Africa, the Arab countries and the entire Middle East. Commandos "which is the preferred name for naming the Zamalek handball teams by the club fans", and holds continental titles around the world. Zamalek is 12 continental titles away from the closest competitor anywhere. occupies the 3rd place in crowned titles, 3 titles behind the 1st place and 1 title from the 2nd place holder. Here are the following top 5 clubs with continental Handball titles around the world.

Pos.	Team	Titles	Continental
1	(Algeria) GS Pétroliers	29	CAHB
2	(Spain) FC Barcelona	27	EHF
3	(Egypt) Zamalek SC	26	CAHB
4	(Egypt) Al Ahly	19	CAHB
5	(Germany) SC Magdeburg SC	14	EHF

== Honours ==
=== Domestic ===
- Egyptian Professional League
  - Winners (19): 1976–77, 1978–79, 1980–81, 1982–83, 1984–85, 1989–90, 1990–91, 1994–95, 1995–96, 1998–99, 2000–01, 2004–05, 2008–09, 2009–10, 2015–16, 2018–19, 2019–20, 2020–21, 2021–22
- Egyptian Cup
  - Winners (16; Record): 1979, 1980, 1981, 1982, 1983, 1986, 1991, 1992, 1994, 1999, 2001, 2002, 2004, 2006, 2008, 2016
- Egyptian Super Cup
  - Winners (4; Record): 2006, 2007, 2008, 2022
- Egyptian Excellence Cup (Defunct)
  - Winners (3; Record): 2001, 2002, 2002
- Egyptian Professional Super Cup (Defunct)
  - Winners (1): 2022
- National Local League (Defunct)
  - Winners (1): 2002
- Giza Region League (Defunct)
  - Winners (1): 1963
- Egyptian Federation Cup (Defunct)
  - Winners (1): 2004

=== African ===
- African Champions League
  - Winners (12; Record): 1979, 1980, 1981, 1986, 1991, 2001, 2002, 2011, 2015, 2017, 2018, 2019
  - Runners-up (3): 2012, 2022, 2026
  - Third-Place (4): 1984, 1992, 2016, 2024
- African Cup Winners' Cup
  - Winners (7): 1985, 2009, 2010, 2011, 2016, 2022, 2023
  - Runners-up (4): 1987, 2012, 2024 , 2025
  - Third-Place (4): 1986, 1990, 1993, 2007
- African Super Cup
  - Winners (7): 2002, 2010, 2011, 2012, 2018, 2019, 2021
  - Runners-up (5): 2016, 2017, 2022, 2023, 2024

=== Worldwide ===
- Super Globe
  - Third-Place: 2010
  - Fourth-Place: 2011, 2012, 2026
  - Fifth-Place: 2019, 2021, 2025

=== Regional ===
- Arab Club Championship
  - Winners (1): 1999
  - Runners-up (4): 1997, 2000, 2022, 2023

=== Friendly ===
- Luxembourg International Championship
  - Winners (1): 2015
- Mohammed bin Khalid Al Qasimi International Championship
  - Winners (2): February 2015, December 2015

=== Doubles and trebles ===
- Double (EHL & EHC)
  - Winners (7): 1978–79, 1980–81, 1982–83, 1990–91, 1998–99, 2000–01, 2015–16
- Triple (EHL, EHC & AHCL)
  - Winners (4): 1978–79, 1980–81, 1990–91, 2000–01

== Performance in the CAHB competitions ==
- Winner 26 African championships.
- Participated in the Competition's : 43×
- Participations in Champions League : 17×
- Participations in Cup Winners' Cup : 14×
- Participations in Super Cup : 12×

Rank	African Champions League	African Cup Winners' Cup	African Super Cup
1	12	7	7
2	2	3	5
3	3	4	-

== Performance in the IHF Super Globe ==
- Qualified to the IHF Super Globe 6 times.
- Participated in the competition 5 times (2010, 2011, 2012, 2019, 2021)
- Withdrew from the competition 1 time (2018) Because of a diplomatic crisis between Egypt and Qatar.

Rank	(Qatar) 2010	(Qatar) 2011	(Qatar) 2012	(Saudi Arabia) 2019	(Saudi Arabia) 2021
1					
2					
3	(Egypt) ZSC				
4		(Egypt) ZSC	(Egypt) ZSC		
5				(Egypt) ZSC	(Egypt) ZSC
6					
7					
8					
9					
10					
Total	1	2	3	4	5

== Youth Team ==
Zamalek youth set-up has been recognised as one of the best in Egypt for producing young talents. While not all graduates made it to the first team, many have enjoyed successful careers in the Egyptian & World top flight. The beginning was in 1950s, When Zamalek managed to open a branch for handball in the club, the Amateurs was relied upon and the young talents present in sports schools and universities were selected and joined to the club and building a strong youth sector in the club. Among those young people who helped spread the game in Egypt and build the handball family in Zamalek Club are the former president of Zamalek Club, Kamal Darwish and Hassan Saqr, the former head of the National Sports Council, The passing of the generations of the s1970s & 1980s, who were dominant in the local and continental championships, starting with Hussein Labib, the former president of Zamalek Club, and Hisham Nasr, the former president of the Egyptian Handball Federation, until the Al-Ahmar family, starting with the father, Mustafa Al-Ahmar, until the eternal legend in Egyptian & Arab and African handballer Ahmed Al-Ahmar is the most famous family in the history of Egyptian handball. And many names from the family makers and sons of the Zamalek Handball Club who made international achievements such as the family of Mamdouh Hashem, and Mohamed Mamdouh Hashem, first Egyptian handball player to win EHF Champions League. Hussein Zaki, who joined the youth team at the age of 13, who was the first Egyptian handball player to win a continental Titles in Europe. Khaled Fathi the father and Yahya Khaled the son, who joined the Zamalek at the age of 19, And the top scorer of the IHF Youth World Championship 2019 Hassan Walid Kaddah, who joined the Zamalek at the age of 19. The youth system is also notable for its contribution to the Egyptian handball national senior and youth teams. In The Victory of the 1993 IHF Junior World Championship, 2019 IHF Youth World Championship.

=== Youth competitions ===
- Egyptian Handball Cup U21
  - Winners (5): 1993–94, 1994–95, 2012–13, 2014–15, 2022–23
- Egyptian Handball Cup U18
  - Winners (3): 1995–96, 1996–97, 2019–20
- Egyptian Handball Cup U16
  - Winners (3): 1996–97, 2004–05, 2022–23
- Egyptian Handball League U18
  - Winners (2): 2020–21, 2021–22
- Egyptian Handball League U16
  - Winners (2): 2014–15, 2022–23
- Cairo League U20
  - Winners (1): 1974–75

== Team ==
=== Current squad ===
Squad for the 2023–24 Season.

Goalkeepers

- 72 (Egypt) Mahmoud Khalil
- 12 (Egypt) Hesham El-Sobky
- (Egypt) Ahmed Waleed

Left Wingers

- 11 (Egypt) Ahmed Moamen Safa
- 31 (Egypt) Omar Al-Wakil
- 3 (Egypt) Mazen Reda

Right Wingers

- (Egypt) Moamen Zaki
- 1 (Egypt) Akram Yosri

Line Players

- 25 (Egypt) Wisam Nawar
- 24 (Egypt) Khalid Waleed
- 77 (Egypt) Shady Khalil
- 41 (Egypt) Mohamed Tarek

Left Backs

- 44 (Egypt) Mohamed Yassin
- (Egypt) Hesham Salah
- (Egypt) Mohamed Samir

Central Backs

- 20 (Egypt) Mohamed Alaa
- 8 (Egypt) Mohamed El-Bassiouny
- (Egypt) Ahmed Sameh

Right Backs

- 66 (Egypt) Ahmed El-Ahmar (C)
- 18 (Egypt) Ahmed Hossam

=== Transfers ===
- Transfers for the 2023–24 season

Joining

- (Egypt) Moamen Zaki (RW) (from (Egypt) Smouha SC)
- (Egypt) Ahmed Waleed (GK) (from (Egypt) Bank Al Ahli)
- (Egypt) Ahmed Sameh (CB) (from (Egypt) Heliolido)

Leaving

- (Egypt) Hassan Kaddah (LB) (to (Poland) Vive Kielce)
- (Egypt) Mohamed Ramadan (LP) (Retirement)
- (Spain) Mateo Garralda (Head Coach) (to (Saudi Arabia)

Mudhar)

- (Egypt) Karim Handawy (GK) (to (Saudi Arabia) Al Safa Club)
- (Egypt) Omar El-Fouly (CB) (to ?)
- (Egypt) Hazem Mamdouh (RW) (to ?)
- (Egypt) Mustafa Beshir (RB) (to ?)
- (Egypt) Aly Hesham Nasr (LB) (to ?)
- (Argentina) James Parker (LB) (to (Qatar) Al-Gharafa SC)

== Personnel ==
=== Current staff ===
Staff for the 2023–24 season

Position	Name
President	(Egypt) Hussein Labib
Sports Director	(Egypt) Khaled Fathy
General Manager	(Egypt) Hassan Yousry
Sports Coordinator	(Egypt) Hamada Abdelbary
Head coach	(Egypt) Magdy Abou El-Magd
Assistant Coach	(Egypt) Ehab Mohsen
Team Physician	(Egypt) Amr Ali
Physiotherapist	(Egypt) Mohamed Ashraf
Masseur	(Egypt) Mustafa Al-Sunni

== Former club members ==
=== Notable former players ===
- (Egypt) Hassan Sakr
- (Egypt) Kamal Darwish
- (Egypt) Hussein Labib
- (Egypt) Mostafa El-Ahmar
- (Egypt) Khaled Fathy
- (Egypt) Hossam Haroun
- (Egypt) Hisham Nasr
- (Egypt) Mamdouh Hashem
- (Egypt) Saad Selim
- (Egypt) Abdulrahman El-bohy
- (Egypt) Alaa Salah
- (Egypt) Ezz El Matarawy
- (Egypt) Ismail Mohamed Ali
- (Egypt) Medhat El-Beltagy
- (Egypt) Mamdouh Jalal
- (Egypt) Gamal Hussein
- (Egypt) Oussama Gomaa
- (Egypt) Hossam Esmat
- (Egypt) Amr Salah
- (Egypt) Hussein Zaky
- (Egypt) Hosam Abdallah
- (Egypt) Tariq Jibril
- (Egypt) Abdalla Ali Mohamed
- (Egypt) Walid Abdel Maksoud
- (Egypt) Moamen Safa
- (Egypt) Ayman Abdel Hamid Soliman
- (Egypt) Ayoub Debes
- (Egypt) Ahmed El-Attar
- (Egypt) Ahmed Ali
- (Egypt) Mohamed Sharaf El-Din
- (Egypt) Mahmoud Hussein
- (Egypt) Magdy Abou El-Magd
- (Egypt) Hassan Yousry
- (Egypt) Wael Fahim
- (Egypt) Bassem El Sobky
- (Egypt) Ahmed Ramadan
- (Egypt) Ahmed Debes
- (Egypt) Ehab Mohsen
- (Egypt) Mohamed Abd El-Salam
- (Egypt) Belal Mabrouk
- (Egypt) Mohamed El Bohy
- (Egypt) Wael Abdel-Aty
- (Egypt) Ramy Mohamed Youssef
- (Egypt) Mohamed Shebib
- (Egypt) Mohammad Sanad
- (Egypt) Yahia Omar
- (Egypt) Yehia El-Deraa
- (Tunisia) Oussama Boughanmi
- (Algeria) Messaoud Berkous
- (Tunisia) Skander Zaïdi
- (Egypt) Seif El-Deraa
- (Egypt) Hassan Kaddah

=== Notable former coaches ===
- (Egypt) Hanafi Nassar
- (Egypt) Kamal Darwish
- (Egypt) Sami Muhammad Ali
- (Egypt) Mohamed Tawfiq Al Welily
- (Egypt) Mohamed Safwat
- (Egypt) Mamdouh Hashem
- (Egypt) Ali Abdul-Azim
- (Egypt) Ahmed Debes
- (Egypt) Ayman Abdel Hamid Soliman
- (Egypt) Ayoub Debes
- (Egypt) Magdy Abou El-Magd
- (Egypt) Bassem El Sobky
- (Egypt) Hussein Zaky
- (Spain) Olivier Roy

== Kit providers ==
History Of Kit Providers For Zamalek Handball Team.

Period	Kit Provider
2010–2015	Adidas
2015–2016	Macron
2016–2018	Joma
2018–2021	Puma
2021–	Tempo

== Supporters ==
Zamalek has an ultras group named the Ultras White Knights that was founded on 17 March 2007 and is known for its pyrotechnic displays. Their motto is "Brotherhood in blood and fans of the free public Club". They were involved in clashes on 8 February 2015 before the league match between Zamalek and ENPI Club at the Cairo Air Defense Stadium, where 20 people were killed. The Zamalek fans have always been supportive of all sports games of the Zamalek club, most notably handball, which the Zamalek fans called his team the commandos. The fans of Zamalek have always been associated with the game of handball from the 1980s until now, and the other sports games of the club in general. And the fans of Zamalek were the first to launch the term kings of the halls in Africa and the Arab world, as the sports games in Zamalek Club achieved international and local achievements.

== See also ==
- 2023–24 Zamalek SC (handball)
