= Akram Yosri =

Egyptian handball player

Personal information
- Nationality: Egyptian
- Born: 22 November 1994 (age 31)
- Height: 1.82 m (6 ft 0 in)

Sport
- Sport: Handball
- Position: Right wing
- Current club: Zamalek SC
- Number: 1
National team
| Years | Team | Apps |
| – | Egypt | 82 |
Medal record
Mediterranean Games
| Silver medal – second place | 2022 Oran | Team |

Akram Saad (Arabic: أكرم يسري; born 22 November 1994) is an Egyptian handball player for Zamalek SC and the Egyptian national team.

He represented Egypt at the World Men's Handball Championship in 2019, and 2021.

== Honours ==
=== Club ===
==== National titles ====
===== Zamalek =====
- Egyptian Handball League: 3

Champions: 2018–19, 2019–20, 2020–21.

===== Heliopolis =====
- Egyptian Handball Cup: 1

Champions: 2017.

==== International titles ====
===== Zamalek =====
- African Handball Champions League: 3

Champions: 2017, 2018, 2019

- African Handball Super Cup: 3

Champions: 2018, 2019, 2021

=== National team ===
- African Men's Handball Championship: 1

Champions: 2020
