= Hussein Zaky =

Egyptian handball player

Hussain Zaki Said
Personal information
- Nationality: Egyptian
- Born: 1 March 1979 (age 47) Alexandria, Egypt
- Height: 190 cm (75 in)

Sport
- Sport: Handball
- Position: Centre back

Senior clubs
- Years: Team
- 1995-2002: Zamalek SC
- 2002-2005: BM Ciudad Real
- 2005-2009: BM Aragón
- 2009-2010: Al-Ain
- 2010-2017: Al-Ahly
National team
Years	Team	Apps
–	Egypt	140

Teams managed
- –: Egypt youth
- 2020-2021: Zamalek SC

Hussain Zaki Said (born 1 March 1979) is an Egyptian handball player and coach who competed in the 2000 Summer Olympics, in the 2004 Summer Olympics, and in the 2008 Summer Olympics. He is broadly recognized as both one of the best Egyptian and best African players of all time.

He was the head coach of the Handball team in Zamalek SC from 2020 to 2021, where he won the Egyptian championship with the club. His professional career as Egyptian National Handball Team Coach achieved Eighth Place in the IHF World Men's Handball Championship and Coach of the Egyptian Junior Team and Winners of the Junior African Handball Championship. Hussain Zaky was the coach of the Egypt men's national youth handball team that took the World championship in 2019 with merit for the first country outside Europe to carry the title.

As a player he played for Al Ahli Club - Dubai UAE, Al Ain FC - Al Ain - UAE, BM Aragón - Spain, BM Ciudad Real - Spain, Zamalek SC - Egypt, Al Nahass Club Alexandria - Egypt. His Achievements are as follows Best African Scorer in the History of IHF World Cups with 221 Goals, Best African Scorer in Olympic history with 77 goals, Best Handball Scorer of the Egyptian National Team Throughout History, Selected Eleventh in the IHF World Player of the Year Awards, Third Top Scorer in the Liga ASOBAL 2005 with 195 Goals, Second Best Scorer in the 2003 World Men's Handball Championship with 61 Goals, Best Player in the 2002 IHF Super Globe, Seventh Best Player Worldwide in the 2001 World Men's Handball Championship, selected for the all star team at the 2001 World Men's Handball Championship in France, Men's Junior Handball World Championship Turkey 1997 with 69 Goals, Best Egyptian Scorer in the EHF Champions League with 89 Goals, Best Egyptian Scorer in the European Cup with 128 Goals, Holds European Record in One Match at the European Super Cup with 14 Goals.

== Private life ==
He completed his graduation in Bachelor's in Physical Education at National Academy of Physical Education Bucharest - Romania.

== Awards ==
• African Men's Youth Handball Championship (2018) - Winner of the African Men's Youth Handball Championship Cup • IHF World Cup (1999 – 2011) - Winner of Seven Consecutive IHF World Cups • Olympic Championships (2000 – 2008) - Winner of Three Consecutive Olympic Awards • IHF Men's Junior World Championship (1997 – 1999) - Winner of the World Cup Championship • Best Player in the World Club Championship with Al Sadd SC Qatar 2002 • Best Centre-Half Player in the 2001 IHF World Men's Handball Championship • Best player in the Men's Junior Handball World Championship Qatar 1999 • Men's Junior Handball World Championship Turkey 1997 • Career Achievements Include 750 Total Goals. 12 Titles, and 15 Awards
