= Hassan Yousry =

Egyptian handball player

Personal information
- Full name: Hassan Rabie Yousry
- Nationality: Egyptian
- Born: 10 May 1978 (age 46)

Sport
- Sport: Handball

Hassan Yousry (born 10 May 1978) is an Egyptian handball player. He competed in the men's tournament at the 2004 Summer Olympics and at the 2008 Summer Olympics.
