= 2019–20 Egyptian Handball League =

Egyptian Handball League
- Season: 2019–20
- Dates: 5 September 2019 – 5 March 2020
- Champions: Zamalek (17th title)

The 2019–20 Egyptian Handball League was the 64th edition of the Egyptian Handball League, which Zamalek crowned for the second time in a row, After the season was canceled due to the outbreak of Covid-19, two games before the end, and Zamalek was given the title to top the table

== League System ==
The 20219–20 Egyptian Handball League system consists of two phases, the first phase of which the 18 teams meet only once, the team plays 17 matches, then the first 8 teams ascend to the next phase after adding the results of the linked, and the team goes up by points of direct confrontations with the other seven teams. The final stage, from one round, where each team plays 7 matches, and the one with the highest points is crowned.

== The First Stage ==
Pos	Team	Pld	W	D	L	GF	GA	GD	Pts	
1	Zamalek	17	16	0	1	551	411	+140	49	Advance to the final stage
2	Al Ahly	17	15	0	2	451	357	+94	47	Advance to the final stage
3	Tallaa Elgish	17	14	1	2	519	429	+90	46	Advance to the final stage
4	Heliopolis	17	12	2	3	499	443	+56	43	Advance to the final stage
5	Sporting	17	12	0	5	428	443	−15	41	Advance to the final stage
6	Smouha	17	11	1	5	444	414	+30	40	Advance to the final stage
7	Olympic	17	9	2	6	424	403	+21	37	Advance to the final stage
8	Bank Al Ahli	17	7	3	7	401	425	−24	34	Advance to the final stage
9	Gezira	17	7	3	7	431	430	+1	34	
10	El Maady	17	7	1	9	428	460	−32	32	
11	Al Ahram	17	6	1	10	379	404	−25	30	
12	Geziret Elward	17	5	1	11	399	466	−67	28	
13	Ashab Aljead	17	3	4	10	405	435	−30	27	
14	Al Zohour	17	3	4	10	402	434	−32	27	
15	6october	17	4	1	12	410	476	−66	26	
16	Elteran	17	4	0	13	367	413	−46	25	
17	AlHiwar	17	2	3	12	379	445	−66	24	
18	El Fayoum	17	2	1	14	405	468	−63	22	

== Final stage ==
The final stageEach team ascends with live score points with the seven teams qualified for the final stage

Pos	Team	Pld	W	D	L	GF	GA	GD	Pts	
1	Zamalek	5	4	0	1	156	129	+27	13	Total Pts (34) (champions)
2	Al Ahly	5	5	0	0	157	116	+41	15	Total Pts (32)
3	Tallaa Elgish	5	4	1	0	146	123	+23	14	Total Pts (30)
4	Heliopolis	5	0	1	4	121	154	−33	6	Total Pts (22)
5	Sporting	5	1	2	2	130	136	−6	9	Total Pts (22)
6	Smouha	5	1	2	2	110	131	−21	9	Total Pts (20)
7	Olympic	5	1	2	2	117	132	−15	9	Total Pts (19)
8	Bank Al Ahli	5	0	0	5	122	138	−16	5	Total Pts (13)

The league was suspended on March 6, 2019, due to the outbreak of the new Corona virus, and then it was announced on May 22 that the season had been canceled with the clubs’ approval.

== Final Decision ==
The Board of Directors of the Egyptian Handball Federation Egyptian Handball Federation announced giving Zamalek the title, due to its position on the league table, in addition to being the champion of the previous version, on May 22, 2021.

== Cairo Derby ==
Only Match of The First Stage date= Friday 29 November 2019

Team 1	Score	Team 2
Zamalek (Egypt)	22–20	(Egypt) Al Ahly SC
