= 2020–21 Egyptian Handball League =

Egyptian Handball League
- Season: 2020–21
- Dates: 27 September 2020 – 19 April 2021
- Champions: Zamalek (18th title)

The 2020–21 Egyptian Handball League was the 65th edition of the Egyptian Handball League, which Zamalek crowned for the third time in a row.

== League system ==
The 2020–21 Egyptian Handball League system was held in two phases, the first phase divided the 18 teams into two groups, with the first four teams from each group advancing to the next round. The next round, a stage of one group, wins the most points, and when the points are equal, a play-off is played between them.

== The first stage ==
=== Group 1 ===
Pos	Team	Pld	W	D	L	GF	GA	GD	Pts	
1	Zamalek	8	8	0	0	289	192	+97	24	Advance to the final stage
2	Tallaa Elgish	8	7	0	1	235	202	+33	22	Advance to the final stage
3	Heliopolis	8	6	0	2	232	197	+35	20	Advance to the final stage
4	Elteran	8	4	1	3	163	182	−19	17	Advance to the final stage
5	Gezira	8	3	2	3	214	196	+18	16	
6	Smouha	8	2	2	4	213	222	−9	14	
7	Al Ahram	8	2	0	6	185	235	−50	12	
8	Asyut Petroleum	8	1	0	7	164	219	−55	10	
9	Asyut Sport	8	0	1	7	178	228	−50	9	

=== Group 2 ===
Pos	Team	Pld	W	D	L	GF	GA	GD	Pts	
1	Al Ahly	8	8	0	0	254	176	+78	24	Advance to the final stage
2	Sporting	8	7	0	1	236	196	+40	22	Advance to the final stage
3	Al Zohour	8	3	3	2	214	215	−1	17	Advance to the final stage
4	Olympic	8	4	1	3	194	197	−3	17	Advance to the final stage
5	El Maady	8	3	1	4	184	195	−11	15	
6	Al Shams	8	3	0	5	199	208	−9	14	
7	Bank Al Ahli	8	2	2	4	181	204	−23	14	
8	Port Said	8	2	0	6	193	236	−43	12	
9	Ashab Aljead	8	1	0	7	181	209	−28	10	

== The final stage ==
Pos	Team	Pld	W	D	L	GF	GA	GD	Pts	
1	Zamalek	14	12	1	1	446	379	+67	39	Qualified for the play-off
2	Al Ahly	14	12	1	1	471	359	+112	39	Qualified for the play-off
3	Sporting	14	7	3	4	366	344	+22	31	
4	Tallaa Elgish	14	6	2	6	372	366	+6	28	
5	Heliopolis	14	4	4	6	386	407	−21	26	
6	Olympic	14	5	2	7	354	378	−24	26	
7	Elteran	14	1	2	11	338	420	−82	18	
8	Al Zohour	14	1	1	12	369	449	−80	17	

=== notes ===
Zamalek and Al Ahly qualified for a play-off match to determine the League champion, according to the regulations, after equal points.

== League Champion Match ==
Mon, 19 Apr 2021; 22:00 CAT (UTC+2)	Zamalek (Egypt)	18–17	(Egypt) Al Ahly	Dr Hassan Moustafa Sports Hall, cairo
Mon, 19 Apr 2021; 22:00 CAT (UTC+2)		(11–10)		Dr Hassan Moustafa Sports Hall, cairo

== Cairo Derby ==
The first round match of the final stage Thursday 18 February 2021

Team 1	Score	Team 2
Zamalek (Egypt)	28–27	(Egypt) Al Ahly SC

The second round match of the final stage Friday 16 April 2021

Team 1	Score	Team 2
Zamalek (Egypt)	28–28	(Egypt) Al Ahly SC

League Champion Match Monday 19 April 2021

Team 1	Score	Team 2
Zamalek (Egypt)	18–17	(Egypt) Al Ahly SC
