= Mohamed El-Bassiouny =

Egyptian handball player

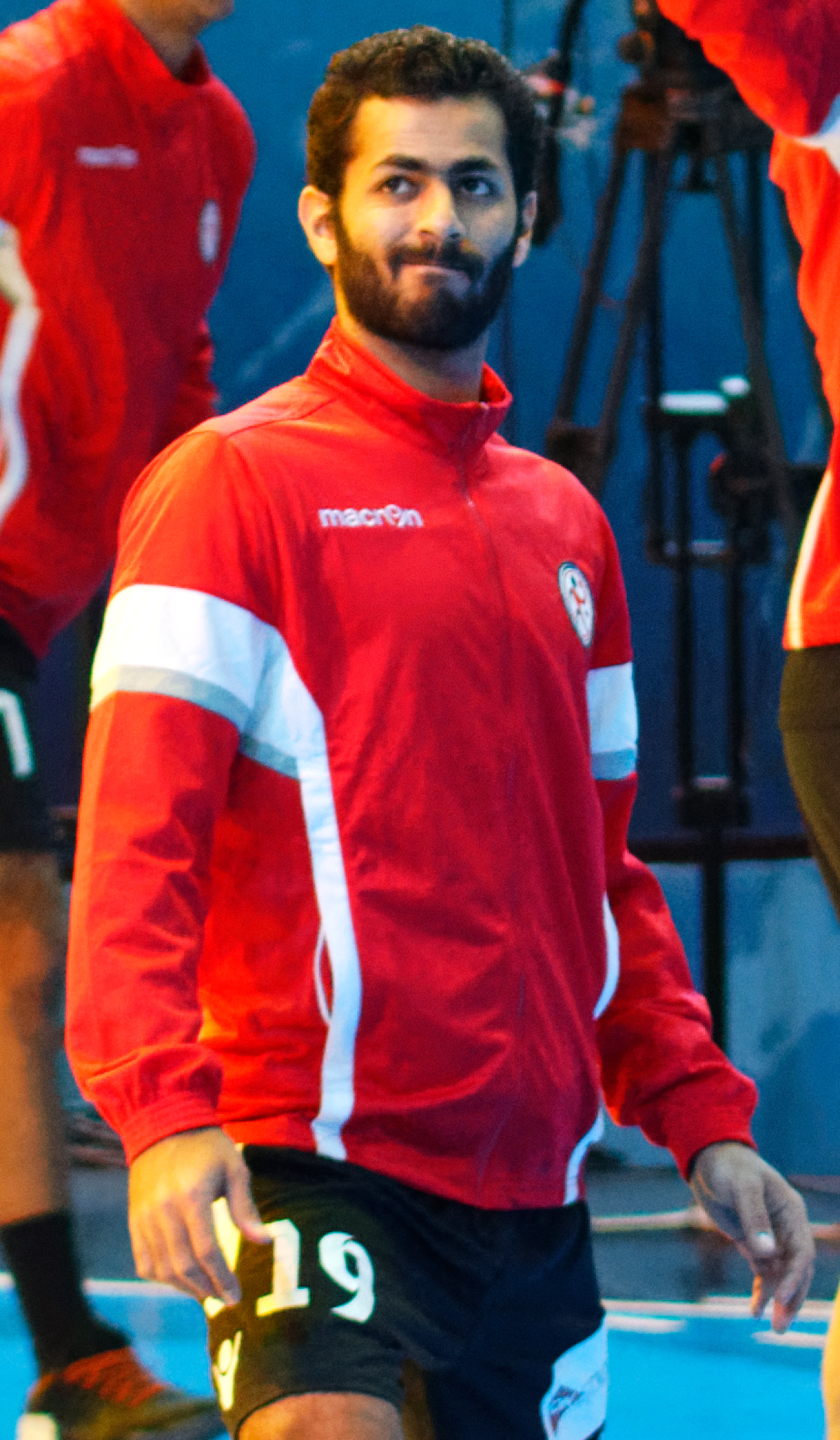

Personal information
- Full name: Mohamed Hashim El-Bassiouny
- Nationality: Egyptian
- Born: 10 May 1990 (age 36)
- Height: 1.86 m (6 ft 1 in)

Sport
- Sport: Handball
- Position: Centre back
- Current club: Zamalek SC
- Number: 8
National team
Years	Team	Apps	(Gls)
–	Egypt	136	(399)
Medal record
Mediterranean Games
Gold medal – first place	2013 Mersin	Team

Mohamed Hashim Ahmad El-Bassiouny (born 10 May 1990) is an Egyptian handball player for Zamalek SC (handball) and the Egyptian national team.
