= Omar El-Wakil =

Egyptian handball player

Personal information
- Full name: Omar Mostafa Mohamed El-Wakil
- Nationality: Egyptian
- Born: 14 May 1988 (age 38)
- Height: 1.79 m (5 ft 10 in)

Sport
- Sport: Handball
- Position: Left wing
- Current club: Zamalek
- Number: 31
National team
Years	Team	Apps
–	Egypt	197
Medal record
African Games
Silver medal – second place	2019 Rabat	Team
Mediterranean Games
Silver medal – second place	2022 Oran	Team

Omar Mostafa Mohamed El-Wakil (Arabic: عمر مصطفى محمد الوكيل; born 14 May 1988) is an Egyptian handball player for Zamalek and the Egyptian national team.

He represented Egypt at the World Men's Handball Championship in 2015, 2019, and 2021.

He also represented Egypt at the Olympic games in Tokyo 2021.

Omar El-wakil got the best left wing in African championship 2022 in Egypt.

He got the best left wing in Arab championship 2022 in Tunisia.

El-Wakil graduated with a chemical engineering degree from Cairo University.
