= Wisam Nawar =

Egyptian handball player

Personal information
- Nationality: Egyptian
- Born: 14 February 1990 (age 36)
- Height: 1.85 m (6 ft 1 in)

Sport
- Sport: Handball
- Position: Pivot
- Current club: Zamalek
- Number: 25
National team
Years	Team	Apps
–	Egypt	152

Wisam Nawar (Arabic: وسام نوار; born 14 February 1990) is an Egyptian handball player for Zamalek and the Egyptian national team.

He represented Egypt at the World Men's Handball Championship in 2015, 2019, and 2021
