= Mahmoud Khalil (handballer) =

Egyptian handball player

Personal information
- Nationality: Egyptian
- Born: 1 June 1991 (age 35)
- Height: 1.92 m (6 ft 4 in)

Sport
- Sport: Handball
- Position: Goalkeeper
- Current club: Zamalek SC (handball)
- Number: 72
National team
Years	Team	Apps	(Gls)
–	Egypt	122	(0)

Mahmoud Khalil (born 1 June 1991) is an Egyptian handball player for Zamalek SC (handball) and the Egyptian national team.
