= Egyptian Handball Cup =

Professional handball league in Egypt

- Founded: 1979; 47 years ago
- Country: Egypt
- Confederation: CAHB
- Most recent champion: Al Ahly SC (12th title)
- Most titles: Zamalek SC (16 titles)
- Broadcaster: OnTime Sports
- 2025-26

Egyptian Handball Cup is an annual cup competition for Egypt handball teams. Organized by the Egyptian Handball Federation, it was originally known as the Egyptian Handball Cup. It was the second nationwide handball competition played in Egypt, with the first competition in 1979.

== List of champions ==
No.	Season	Champions
01	1978–79	Zamalek SC (1)
02	1979–80	Zamalek SC (2)
03	1980–81	Zamalek SC (3)
04	1981–82	Zamalek SC (4)
05	1982–83	Zamalek SC (5)
	1983–84	
	1984–85	
06	1985–86	Zamalek SC (6)
07	1986–87	Port Said SC (1)
08	1987–88	Port Said SC (2)
09	1988–89	Port Said SC (3)
	1989–90	
10	1990–91	Zamalek SC (7)
11	1991–92	Zamalek SC (8)
	1992–93	
12	1993–94	Zamalek SC (9)
	1994–95	
13	1995–96	Al Ahly SC (1)
14	1996–97	Olympic Club (1)
15	1997–98	Al Ahly SC (2)
16	1998–99	Zamalek SC (10)
17	1999–00	Al Ahly SC (3)
18	2000–01	Zamalek SC (11)
19	2001–02	Zamalek SC (12)
	2002–03	
20	2003–04	Zamalek SC (13)
21	2004–05	Al Ahly SC (4)
22	2005–06	Zamalek SC (14)
	2006–07	
23	2007–08	Zamalek SC (15)
24	2008–09	Al Ahly SC (5)
25	2009–10	Police Union (1)
	2010–11	
	2011–12	
26	2012–13	Police Union (2)
27	2013–14	Al Ahly SC (6)
28	2014–15	Heliopolis (1)
29	2015–16	Zamalek SC (16)
30	2016–17	Heliopolis (2)
31	2017–18	Smouha SC (1)
32	2018–19	Al Ahly SC (7)
33	2019–20	Al Ahly SC (8)
34	2020–21	Al Ahly SC (9)
35	2021–22	Sporting (1)
36	2022–23	Al Ahly SC (10)
37	2023–24	Sporting (2)
38	2024–25	Al Ahly SC (11)
39	2025-26	Al Ahly SC (12)

== Winners by year ==
- The complete list of the Egyptian cup winners since 1979:

- 1979 : Zamalek SC (1)
- 1980 : Zamalek SC (2)
- 1981 : Zamalek SC (3)
- 1982 : Zamalek SC (4)
- 1983 : Zamalek SC (5)
- 1986 : Zamalek SC (6)
- 1987 : Port Said SC (1)
- 1988 : Port Said SC (2)
- 1989 : Port Said SC (3)
- 1991 : Zamalek SC (7)
- 1992 : Zamalek SC (8)
- 1994 : Zamalek SC (9)
- 1996 : Al Ahly SC (1)
- 1997 : Olympic Club (1)
- 1998 : Al Ahly SC (2)
- 1999 : Zamalek SC (10)
- 2000 : Al Ahly SC (3)
- 2001 : Zamalek SC (11)
- 2002 : Zamalek SC (12)
- 2004 : Zamalek SC (13)
- 2005 : Al Ahly SC (4)
- 2006 : Zamalek SC (14)
- 2008 : Zamalek SC (15)
- 2009 : Al Ahly SC (5)
- 2010 : Police Union (1)
- 2013 : Police Union (2)
- 2014 : Al Ahly SC (6)
- 2015 : Heliopolis (1)
- 2016 : Zamalek SC (16)
- 2017 : Heliopolis (2)
- 2018 : Smouha SC (1)
- 2019 : Al Ahly SC (7)
- 2020 : Al Ahly SC (8)
- 2021 : Al Ahly SC (9)
- 2022 : Sporting (1)
- 2023 : Al Ahly SC (10)
- 2024 : Sporting (2)
- 2025 : Al Ahly SC (11)
- 2026 : Al Ahly SC (12)

== Titles by club ==
Club	Titles	Years
Zamalek SC	16	1979, 1980, 1981, 1982, 1983, 1986, 1991, 1992, 1994, 1999, 2001, 2002, 2004, 2006, 2008, 2016
Al Ahly SC	12	1996, 1998, 2000, 2005, 2009, 2014, 2019, 2020, 2021, 2023, 2025, 2026
Port Said SC	3	1987, 1988, 1989
Police Union	2	2010, 2013
Heliopolis	2	2015, 2017
Sporting	2	2022, 2024
Smouha SC	1	2018
Olympic Club	1	1997

== See also ==
- Egyptian Handball League
