= Zamalek SC (handball) in the African Competitions =

Zamalek SC in the African Competitions
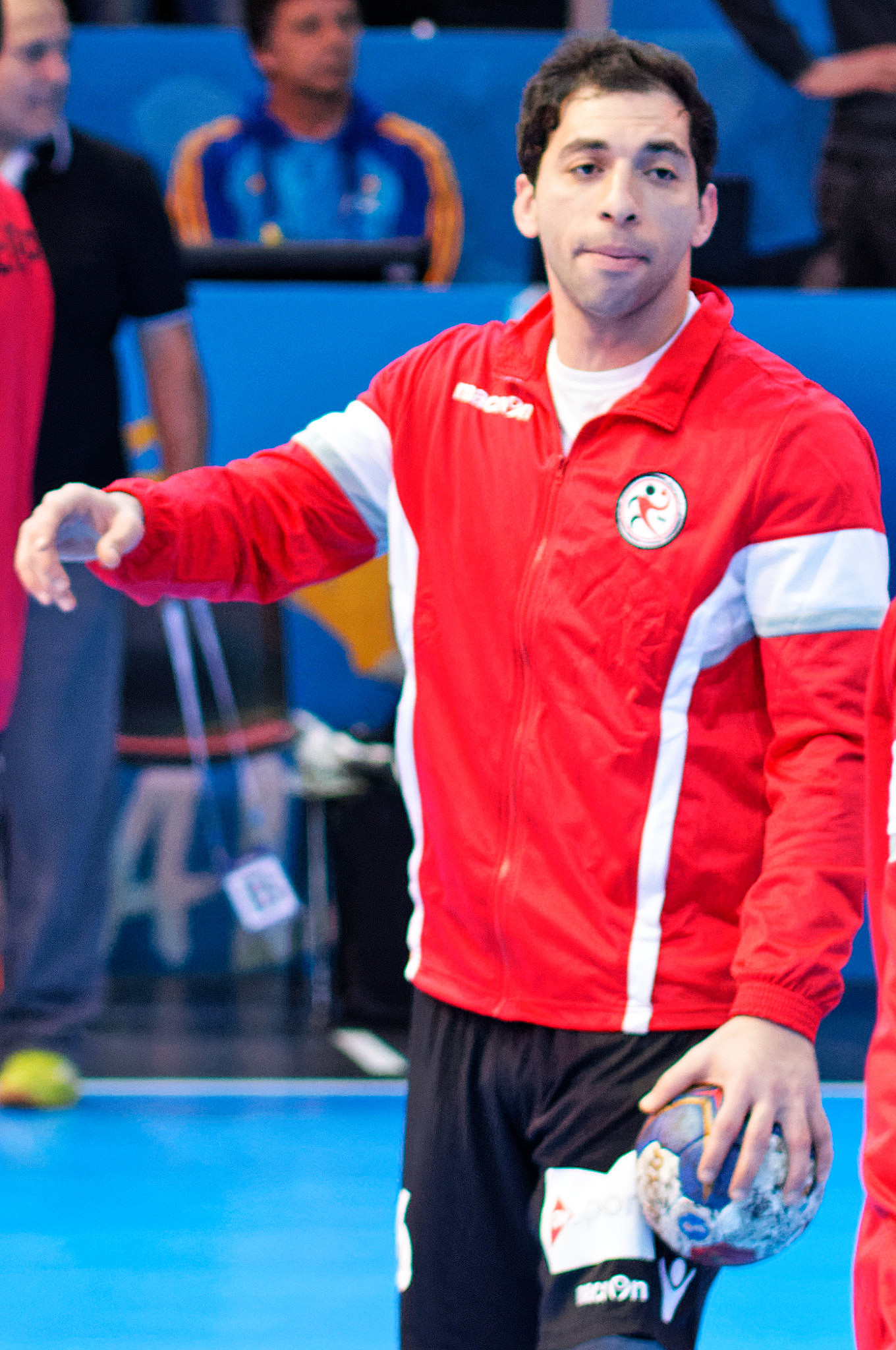
- Ahmed El-Ahmar, The Zamalek player is the most crowned African champion with (17) championships.
- Club: Zamalek SC
- First entry: 1979
- Latest entry: 2023

Zamalek Sporting Club is an Egyptian handball club based in Cairo. Zamalek Sporting Club One of the largest African clubs and the club with the most championships in the African Champions League, where it won the 1st ever African handball Champions League, which was in 1979, and 1st ever winner the African Handball Cup Winners' Cup which was in 1985, 1st Egyptian Team winner the African Handball Super Cup in 2002. Zamalek is The most African teams Qualified for the IHF Super Globe.

== African record ==
Competition	Seasons	Year(s) in the competition
African Champions League	17x	1979, 1980, 1981, 1984, 1986, 1991, 1992, 2001, 2002, 2011, 2012, 2015, 2016, 2017, 2018, 2019, 2022
African Cup Winners' Cup	14x	1985, 1986, 1987, 1990, 1993, 2007, 2009, 2010, 2011, 2012, 2016, 2022, 2023, 2024
African Super Cup	12x	2002, 2010, 2011, 2012, 2016, 2017, 2018, 2019, 2021, 2022, 2023, 2024
43 seasons

== Summary ==
Rank	African Handball Champions League	African Men's Handball Cup Winners' Cup	African Handball Super Cup
1	12	7	7
2	2	3	5
3	3	4	

- African Handball Champions League: 12 (Record)
  - Gold: 1979, 1980, 1981, 1986, 1991, 2001, 2002, 2011, 2015, 2017, 2018, 2019
  - Silver: 2012, 2022
  - Bronze: 1984, 1992, 2016
- African Handball Cup Winners' Cup: 7
  - Gold: 1985, 2009, 2010, 2011, 2016, 2022, 2023
  - Silver: 1987, 2012
  - Bronze: 1986, 1990, 1993, 2007
- African Handball Super Cup: 7
  - Gold: 2002, 2010, 2011, 2012, 2018, 2019, 2021
  - Silver: 2016, 2017, 2022, 2023

== African Handball Champions League ==
=== 1979 African Handball Champions League ===
This competition was held in Round-robin, and 3 teams took part.

- Round 1.

Team 1	Score	Team 2
Zamalek (Egypt)	23–21	(Senegal) ASC Diaraf

- Round 2.

Team 1	Score	Team 2
Zamalek (Egypt)	23–16	(Togo) ASFOSA

- Final Ranking.

1st place, gold medalist(s)	(Egypt) Zamalek
2nd place, silver medalist(s)	(Togo) ASFOSA
3rd place, bronze medalist(s)	(Senegal) ASC Diaraf

=== 1980 African Handball Champions League ===
This competition was held in Knock-out Rounds, on a Home & Away, and 8 teams took part.

- Quarter Final.

Team 1	Agg.	Team 2	1st leg	2nd leg
Zamalek (Egypt)	100–24	(Kenya) UMEME	58–11	42–13

- Semi Final.

Team 1	Agg.	Team 2	1st leg	2nd leg
Zamalek (Egypt)	20–17	(Cameroon) CIMENCAM	20–17	W–L

Cimencam Douala withdrew before the 2nd Leg.

- Final.

Team 1	Score	Team 2
Zamalek (Egypt)	20–19	(Algeria) Nadit Alger

- Final Ranking.

1st place, gold medalist(s)	(Egypt) Zamalek
2nd place, silver medalist(s)	(Algeria) Nadit Alger

=== 1981 African Handball Champions League ===
This competition was held in groups format, and 7 teams took part.

- Group Stage.

Team 1	Score	Team 2
Zamalek (Egypt)	26–21	(Angola) Primeiro de Agosto

Team 1	Score	Team 2
Zamalek (Egypt)	25–15	(Ivory Coast) Red Star OJA

Team 1	Score	Team 2
Zamalek (Egypt)	21–22	(Cameroon) Université de Yaoundé

- Semi Final.

Team 1	Score	Team 2
Zamalek (Egypt)	30–26	(Egypt) Club of Shebeen for Spinning

- Final.

Team 1	Score	Team 2
Zamalek (Egypt)	34–26	(Senegal) ASC Diaraf

- Final Ranking.

1st place, gold medalist(s)	(Egypt) Zamalek
2nd place, silver medalist(s)	(Senegal) ASC Diaraf
3rd place, bronze medalist(s)	(Egypt) Club of Shebeen for Spinning

=== 1986 African Handball Champions League ===
This competition was held in groups format, and 11 teams took part.

- Group Stage.

Team 1	Score	Team 2
Zamalek (Egypt)	23–14	(Senegal) ASC Diaraf

Team 1	Score	Team 2
Zamalek (Egypt)	22–22	(Ivory Coast) Red Star OJA

- Final Qualifying Group Stage.

Team 1	Score	Team 2
Zamalek (Egypt)	18–17	(Nigeria) Niger United

Team 1	Score	Team 2
Zamalek (Egypt)	23–19	(Angola) Primeiro de Agosto

- Final.

Team 1	Score	Team 2
Zamalek (Egypt)	19–17	(Republic of the Congo) Inter Club Brazzaville

- Final Ranking.

1st place, gold medalist(s)	(Egypt) Zamalek
2nd place, silver medalist(s)	(Republic of the Congo) Inter Club Brazzaville
3rd place, bronze medalist(s)	(Angola) Primeiro de Agosto

=== 1991 African Handball Champions League ===
This competition was held in groups format, and 8 teams took part.

- Group Stage.

Team 1	Score	Team 2
Zamalek (Egypt)	23–18	(Nigeria) Niger United

Team 1	Score	Team 2
Zamalek (Egypt)	18–16	(Republic of the Congo) Inter Club Brazzaville

Team 1	Score	Team 2
Zamalek (Egypt)	21–21	(Ivory Coast) RC Abidjan

- Semi Final.

Team 1	Score	Team 2
Zamalek (Egypt)	25–24	(Egypt) Port Said

- Final.

Team 1	Score	Team 2
Zamalek (Egypt)	25–22	(Ivory Coast) RC Abidjan

- Final Ranking.

1st place, gold medalist(s)	(Egypt) Zamalek
2nd place, silver medalist(s)	(Ivory Coast) RC Abidjan
3rd place, bronze medalist(s)	(Nigeria) Kano Pyramids

=== 2001 African Handball Champions League ===
- Final.

Team 1	Score	Team 2
Zamalek (Egypt)	26–14	(Nigeria) Niger United

- Final Ranking.

1st place, gold medalist(s)	(Egypt) Zamalek
2nd place, silver medalist(s)	(Nigeria) Niger United
3rd place, bronze medalist(s)	(Cameroon) Minuh Yaoundé

=== 2002 African Handball Champions League ===
- Final.

Team 1	Score	Team 2
Zamalek (Egypt)	37–28	(Angola) Sporting de Luanda

- Final Ranking.

1st place, gold medalist(s)	(Egypt) Zamalek
2nd place, silver medalist(s)	(Angola) Sporting de Luanda
3rd place, bronze medalist(s)	(Senegal) Minuh Yaoundé

=== 2011 African Handball Champions League ===
This competition was held in groups format, and 13 teams took part.

- Group Stage.

Team 1	Score	Team 2
Zamalek (Egypt)	18–24	(Algeria) GS Pétroliers

Team 1	Score	Team 2
Zamalek (Egypt)	27–27	(Cameroon) FAP Yaoundé

Team 1	Score	Team 2
Zamalek (Egypt)	32–24	(Nigeria) Safety Shooters

- Quarter Final.

Team 1	Score	Team 2
Zamalek (Egypt)	30–24	(Egypt) Al Ahly

- Semi Final.

Team 1	Score	Team 2
Zamalek (Egypt)	28–25	(Algeria) JSE Skikda

- Final.

Team 1	Score	Team 2
Zamalek (Egypt)	27–24	(Tunisia) Étoile du Sahel

- Final Ranking.

1st place, gold medalist(s)	(Egypt) Zamalek
2nd place, silver medalist(s)	(Tunisia) Étoile du Sahel
3rd place, bronze medalist(s)	(Angola) Primeiro de Agosto

=== 2015 African Handball Champions League ===
This competition was held in groups format, and 15 teams took part.

- Group Stage.

Team 1	Score	Team 2
Zamalek (Egypt)	24–20	(Cameroon) Fanz

Team 1	Score	Team 2
Zamalek (Egypt)	24–28	(Tunisia) Club Africain

- Quarter Final.

Team 1	Score	Team 2
Zamalek (Egypt)	26–24	(Egypt) Al Ahly

- Semi Final.

Team 1	Score	Team 2
Zamalek (Egypt)	34–33	(Tunisia) Espérance Tunis

- Final.

Team 1	Score	Team 2
Zamalek (Egypt)	35–22	(Tunisia) Club Africain

- Final Ranking.

1st place, gold medalist(s)	(Egypt) Zamalek
2nd place, silver medalist(s)	(Tunisia) Club Africain
3rd place, bronze medalist(s)	(Egypt) Alexandria SC

=== 2017 African Handball Champions League ===
This competition was held in groups format, and 14 teams took part.

- Group Stage.

Team 1	Score	Team 2
Zamalek (Egypt)	38–24	(Ivory Coast) Red Star

Team 1	Score	Team 2
Zamalek (Egypt)	39–19	(Libya) Al-Ittihad

Team 1	Score	Team 2
Zamalek (Egypt)	33–22	Phoenix Gabon

Team 1	Score	Team 2
Zamalek (Egypt)	40–28	(Morocco) Widad Smara

- Quarter Final.

Team 1	Score	Team 2
Zamalek (Egypt)	26–21	(Cameroon) FAP Yaoundé

- Semi Final.

Team 1	Score	Team 2
Zamalek (Egypt)	26–21	(Egypt) Al Ahly

- Final.

Team 1	Score	Team 2
Zamalek (Egypt)	31–29	(Tunisia) ES Tunis

- Final Ranking.

1st place, gold medalist(s)	(Egypt) Zamalek
2nd place, silver medalist(s)	(Tunisia) ES Tunis
3rd place, bronze medalist(s)	(Egypt) Al Ahly

=== 2018 African Handball Champions League ===
This competition was held in groups format, and 9 teams took part.

- Group Stage.

Team 1	Score	Team 2
Zamalek (Egypt)	31–23	(Morocco) Raja Agadir

Team 1	Score	Team 2
Zamalek (Egypt)	31–27	(Algeria) GSP

Team 1	Score	Team 2
Zamalek (Egypt)	28–24	(Democratic Republic of the Congo) JSK

- Quarter Final.

Team 1	Score	Team 2
Zamalek (Egypt)	34–21	(Ivory Coast) Red Star

- Semi Final.

Team 1	Score	Team 2
Zamalek (Egypt)	30–25	(Democratic Republic of the Congo) JSK

- Final.

Team 1	Score	Team 2
Zamalek (Egypt)	27–25	(Egypt) Al Ahly

- Final Ranking.

1st place, gold medalist(s)	(Egypt) Zamalek
2nd place, silver medalist(s)	(Egypt) Al Ahly
3rd place, bronze medalist(s)	(Algeria) GSP

=== 2019 African Handball Champions League ===
This competition was held in groups format, and 10 teams took part.

- Group Stage.

Team 1	Score	Team 2
Zamalek (Egypt)	42–25	(Cape Verde) Desportivo da Praia

Team 1	Score	Team 2
Zamalek (Egypt)	41–26	(Republic of the Congo) Étoile du Congo

Team 1	Score	Team 2
Zamalek (Egypt)	28–23	(Cameroon) FAP Yaoundé

Team 1	Score	Team 2
Zamalek (Egypt)	38–32	(Morocco) Widad Smara

- Quarter Final.

Team 1	Score	Team 2
Zamalek (Egypt)	35–23	(Ivory Coast) Red Star

- Semi Final.

Team 1	Score	Team 2
Zamalek (Egypt)	30–18	(Angola) Interclube

- Final.

Team 1	Score	Team 2
Zamalek (Egypt)	33–31	(Egypt) Alexandria Sporting Club

- Final Ranking.

1st place, gold medalist(s)	(Egypt) Zamalek
2nd place, silver medalist(s)	(Egypt) Alexandria Sporting Club
3rd place, bronze medalist(s)	(Angola) Interclube

== African Handball Cup Winners' Cup ==
=== 1985 African Handball Cup Winners' Cup ===
This competition was held in Round-robin, and 3 teams took part.

Team 1	Score	Team 2
Zamalek (Egypt)	23–16	(Nigeria) Niger United

Team 1	Score	Team 2
Zamalek (Egypt)	24–24	(Egypt) Al Ahly SC

Team 1	Score	Team 2
Zamalek (Egypt)	19–17	(Nigeria) Niger United

Team 1	Score	Team 2
Zamalek (Egypt)	25–20	(Egypt) Al Ahly SC

- Final Ranking.

1st place, gold medalist(s)	(Egypt) Zamalek
2nd place, silver medalist(s)	(Egypt) Al Ahly SC
3rd place, bronze medalist(s)	(Nigeria) Niger United

=== 2009 African Handball Cup Winners' Cup ===
This competition was held in groups format, and 9 teams took part.

- Group Stage.

Team 1	Score	Team 2
Zamalek (Egypt)	40–31	(Togo) Liberté Handball Club

Team 1	Score	Team 2
Zamalek (Egypt)	38–33	(Republic of the Congo) Inter Club Brazzaville

- Quarter Final.

Team 1	Score	Team 2
Zamalek (Egypt)	39–27	(Benin) RC Flowers

- Semi Final.

Team 1	Score	Team 2
Zamalek (Egypt)	34–26	(Ivory Coast) Red Star Oja

- Final.

Team 1	Score	Team 2
Zamalek (Egypt)	31–28	(Cameroon) Minuh Yaoundé

- Final Ranking.

1st place, gold medalist(s)	(Egypt) Zamalek
2nd place, silver medalist(s)	(Cameroon) Minuh Yaoundé
3rd place, bronze medalist(s)	(Republic of the Congo) Inter Club Brazzaville

=== 2010 African Handball Cup Winners' Cup ===
This competition was held in groups format, and 16 teams took part.

- Group Stage.

Team 1	Score	Team 2
Zamalek (Egypt)	36–29	(Republic of the Congo) Munisport

Team 1	Score	Team 2
Zamalek (Egypt)	34–24	(Togo) Curiaces

Team 1	Score	Team 2
Zamalek (Egypt)	36–27	(Benin) ASPAC

- Final Qualifying Group Stage.

Team 1	Score	Team 2
Zamalek (Egypt)	32–28	(Egypt) Al Ahly

Team 1	Score	Team 2
Zamalek (Egypt)	38–25	(Cameroon) Minuh Yaoundé

- Semi Final.

Team 1	Score	Team 2
Zamalek (Egypt)	32–26	(Algeria) JSE Skikda

- Final.

Team 1	Score	Team 2
Zamalek (Egypt)	38–26	(Angola) Interclube

- Final Ranking.

1st place, gold medalist(s)	(Egypt) Zamalek
2nd place, silver medalist(s)	(Angola) Interclube
3rd place, bronze medalist(s)	(Cameroon) Minuh Yaoundé

=== 2011 African Handball Cup Winners' Cup ===
This competition was held in groups format, and 8 teams took part.

- Group Stage.

Team 1	Score	Team 2
Zamalek (Egypt)	31–23	(Democratic Republic of the Congo) JS Kinshasa

Team 1	Score	Team 2
Zamalek (Egypt)	38–21	(Cameroon) FAP Yaoundé

Team 1	Score	Team 2
Zamalek (Egypt)	35–22	(Benin) ASPAC

- Semi Final.

Team 1	Score	Team 2
Zamalek (Egypt)	38–23	(Morocco) Wydad Smara

- Final.

Team 1	Score	Team 2
Zamalek (Egypt)	27–21	(Cameroon) FAP Yaoundé

- Final Ranking

1st place, gold medalist(s)	(Egypt) Zamalek
2nd place, silver medalist(s)	(Cameroon) FAP Yaoundé
3rd place, bronze medalist(s)	(Republic of the Congo) Munisport

=== 2016 African Handball Cup Winners' Cup ===
This competition was held in groups format, and 11 teams took part.

- Group Stage.

Team 1	Score	Team 2
Zamalek (Egypt)	32–25	(Democratic Republic of the Congo) JS Kinshasa

Team 1	Score	Team 2
Zamalek (Egypt)	26–19	(Gabon) Stade Mandji

Team 1	Score	Team 2
Zamalek (Egypt)	42–25	(Cameroon) Eclair D'Eseka

Team 1	Score	Team 2
Zamalek (Egypt)	27–20	(Tunisia) AS Hammamet

Team 1	Score	Team 2
Zamalek (Egypt)	30–17	(Morocco) Widad Smara

- Quarter Final.

Team 1	Score	Team 2
Zamalek (Egypt)	35–22	(Republic of the Congo) Caïman

- Semi Final.

Team 1	Score	Team 2
Zamalek (Egypt)	36–31	(Egypt) Heliopolis

- Final.

Team 1	Score	Team 2
Zamalek (Egypt)	26–25	(Tunisia) ES Tunis

- Final Ranking.

1st place, gold medalist(s)	(Egypt) Zamalek
2nd place, silver medalist(s)	(Tunisia) ES Tunis
3rd place, bronze medalist(s)	(Tunisia) AS Hammamet

=== 2022 African Handball Cup Winners' Cup ===
This competition was held in groups format, and 8 teams took part.

- Group Stage.

Team 1	Score	Team 2
Zamalek (Egypt)	45–29	(Benin) RC Flowers

Team 1	Score	Team 2
Zamalek (Egypt)	43–23	(Niger) AS Niamey

Team 1	Score	Team 2
Zamalek (Egypt)	45–21	(Nigeria) Kano Pillars

- Quarter Final.

Team 1	Score	Team 2
Zamalek (Egypt)	54–31	(Ethiopia) Kirkos

- Semi Final.

Team 1	Score	Team 2
Zamalek (Egypt)	36–21	(Cameroon) FAYaoundé

- Final.

Team 1	Score	Team 2
Zamalek (Egypt)	29–28	(Egypt) Al Ahly

- Final Ranking.

1st place, gold medalist(s)	(Egypt) Zamalek
2nd place, silver medalist(s)	(Egypt) Al Ahly
3rd place, bronze medalist(s)	(Cameroon) FAP Yaoundé

== Africa Handball Super Cup ==
=== 2002 African Handball Super Cup ===
Team 1	Score	Team 2
Zamalek (Egypt)	25–23	(Tunisia) Club Africain

=== 2010 African Handball Super Cup ===
Team 1	Score	Team 2
Zamalek (Egypt)	28–27	(Algeria) GS Pétroliers

=== 2011 African Handball Super Cup ===
Team 1	Score	Team 2
Zamalek (Egypt)	25–21	(Tunisia) Étoile du Sahel

=== 2012 African Handball Super Cup ===
Team 1	Score	Team 2
Zamalek (Egypt)	32–18	(Cameroon) FAP Yaoundé

=== 2018 African Handball Super Cup ===
Team 1	Score	Team 2
Zamalek (Egypt)	21–20	(Egypt) Al Ahly

=== 2019 African Handball Super Cup ===
Team 1	Score	Team 2
Zamalek (Egypt)	38–35	(Egypt) Al Ahly

=== 2021 African Handball Super Cup ===
Team 1	Score	Team 2
Zamalek (Egypt)	28–27	(Egypt) Al Ahly
