= Ahmed El-Ahmar =

Egyptian handball player

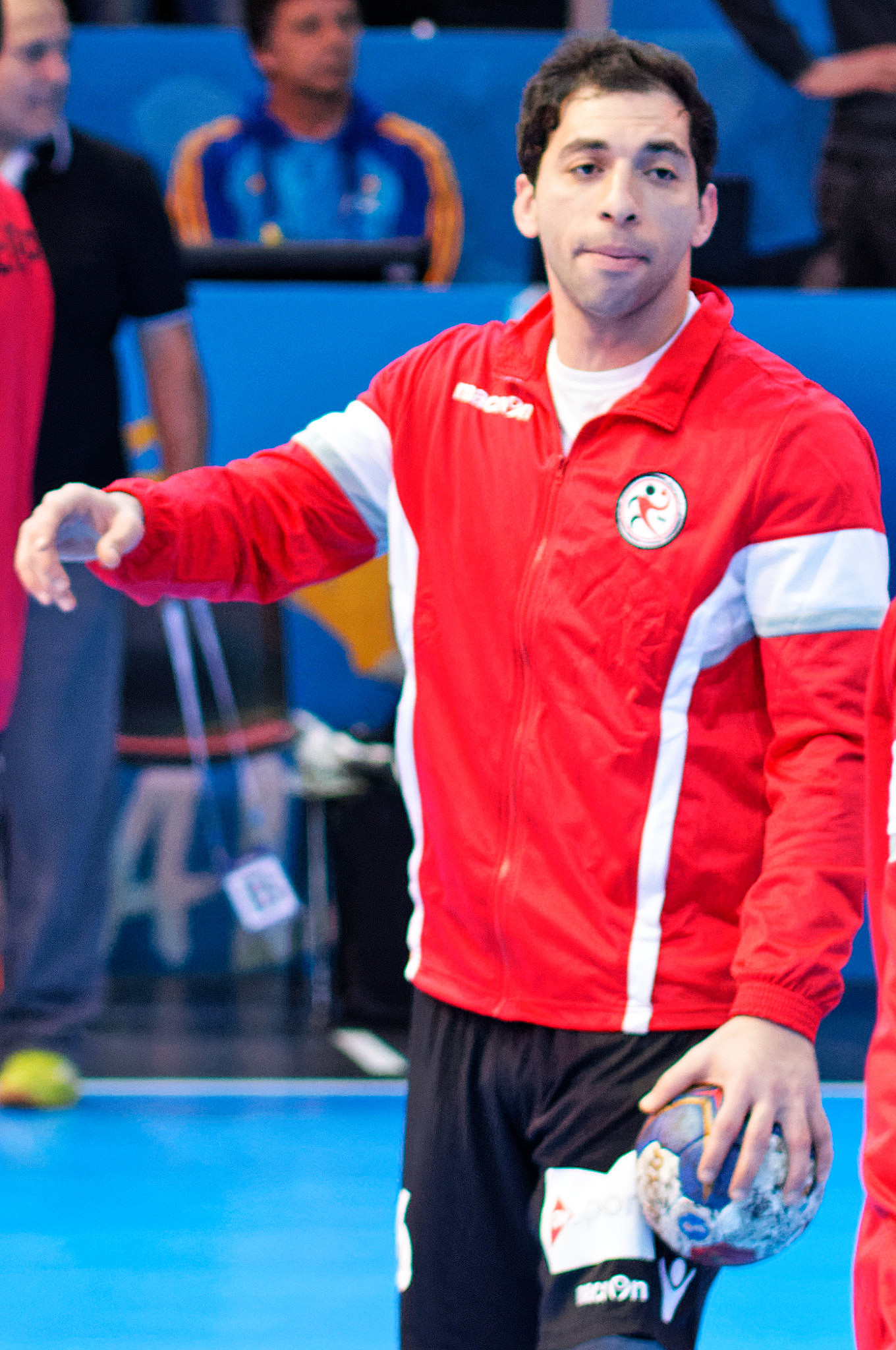
- Ahmed Elahmar in 2017

Personal information
- Full name: Ahmed Moustafa Nasr El-Ahmar
- Nationality: Egyptian
- Born: 27 January 1984 (age 42) Giza, Egypt
- Height: 1.87 m (6 ft 2 in)

Sport
- Sport: Handball
- Position: Right back
- Current club: Zamalek SC
- Number: 66

Senior clubs
- Years: Team
- 2004–2012: Zamalek SC
- 2012–2015: El Jaish Qatar
- 2015: → SG Flensburg-Handewitt (loan)
- 2016-2026: Zamalek SC
- 2022: → (loan) Khaleej Club
- 2023: → (loan) Al-Najma SC
National team
Years	Team	Apps
–	Egypt	75
Medal record
African Championship
Gold medal – first place	2004 Egypt
Gold medal – first place	2008 Angola
Gold medal – first place	2016 Egypt
Gold medal – first place	2020 Tunisia
Gold medal – first place	2022 Egypt
Silver medal – second place	2006 Tunisia
Silver medal – second place	2010 Egypt
Silver medal – second place	2018 Gabon
Mediterranean Games
Gold medal – first place	2013 Mersin	Team
Silver medal – second place	2022 Oran	Team

Ahmed Moustafa Nasr El-Ahmar (also known as Ahmed Elahmar, Arabic: أحمد الأحمر; born 27 January 1984) is an Egyptian handball player for captains club Zamalek SC and the Egyptian national team.

== Club career ==
=== Zamalek ===
El-Ahmar started his career with Zamalek in 2004 and remained until 2012.

=== El Jaish ===
Ahmed El-Ahmar joined El Jaish in 2012 and departed in 2015.

=== SG Flensburg-Handewitt ===
El-Ahmar joined SG Flensburg-Handewitt in February 2015 and departed in June 2015 to replace the injured Holger Glandorf. He won the German Cup with the team in Hamburg on 10 May 2015.

=== Return to El-Zamalek ===
On 4 July 2015, it was officially announced that he signed a 2-year contract with El-Zamalek for the 2015–2017 season. In 2022 he was loaned out to the Saudi-Arabian club Khaleej Club for the duration of the 2022 Super Globe.

== Honours ==
=== Club ===
==== National titles ====
===== Zamalek SC =====
- Egyptian Handball League: 8

Champions: 2004–05, 2008–09, 2009–10, 2015–16, 2018–19, 2019–20, 2020–21, 2021–22.

- Egyptian Handball Cup: 5

Champions: 2002, 2004, 2006, 2008, 2016.

- Egyptian Handball Super Cup: 4

Champions: 2005–06, 2006–07, 2007–08, 2022.

===== El Jaish =====
- Qatar Handball League: 1

Champions : 2013–14

- Qatar Handball Cup: 2

Champions : 2013, 2014

===== SG Flensburg-Handewitt =====
- DHB-Pokal:: 1
  - Gold: 2015

==== International titles ====
===== Zamalek SC =====
- African Handball Champions League: 5

Champions: 2011, 2015, 2017, 2018, 2019
Runners-up: 2012, 2022

- African Handball Cup Winners' Cup: 6

Champions: 2009, 2010, 2011, 2016, 2022, 2023
Runners-up: 2012

- African Handball Super Cup: 6

Champions: 2010, 2011, 2012, 2018, 2019, 2021
Runners-up: 2016, 2017, 2022, 2023

===== Club Africain =====
- African Handball Champions League: 1

Champions: 2014

===== El Jaish =====
- Asian Club League Handball Championship: 2

Champions: 2013, 2014

===== Al Ahli Saudi FC =====
- Asian Club League Handball Championship: 1

Champions: 2008

===== As-Sadd SC =====
- Asian Club League Handball Championship: 1

Champions: 2010

=== National team ===
- African Men's Handball Championship: 5

Champions: 2004, 2008, 2016, 2020, 2022
Runners-up: 2006, 2010, 2018

- All-Africa Games: 1
- 2007 – (gold)

- Pan Arab Games: 2
- 2007 – (gold)
- 2011 – (gold)
- Mediterranean Games: 1
- 2013 – (gold)

== Individual titles ==
- 5th All-time top scorer World Men's Handball Championship with 283 goals.
- African nations Egypt 2004: The best back right in Africa.
- African nations Angola 2008: The best back right, best player, best scorer and man of the match (4 times).
- African nations Egypt 2010: The best back right, best player and best scorer.
- El-Ahram International 2007: The best player.
- El-Ahram International 2009: The best player.
- Arab Championship in Saudi Arabia 2011: The best player.
- Club World Cup 2010 (Super Globe): Top scorer.
- Club World Cup 2011 (Super Globe): Top scorer.
- World Cup Man of the Match: 2007 Egypt against Spain. 2009 Egypt against Tunisia. 2011 Egypt against Tunisia. 2013 Egypt against Algeria. 2013 Egypt against Slovenia. 2015 – Egypt against Sweden. 2015 – Egypt against Algeria.
- African nations championship 2016: Top scorer, the most valuable player, the best back right.

== See also ==
- List of men's handballers with 1000 or more international goals

Olympic Games
Preceded by Hesham Mesbah	Flagbearer for Egypt; 2016 Rio de Janeiro	Succeeded by Hedaya Malak Alaaeldin Abouelkassem
