= Mohamed Mamdouh Shebib =

Egyptian handball player

Mohamed Mamdouh Hashem
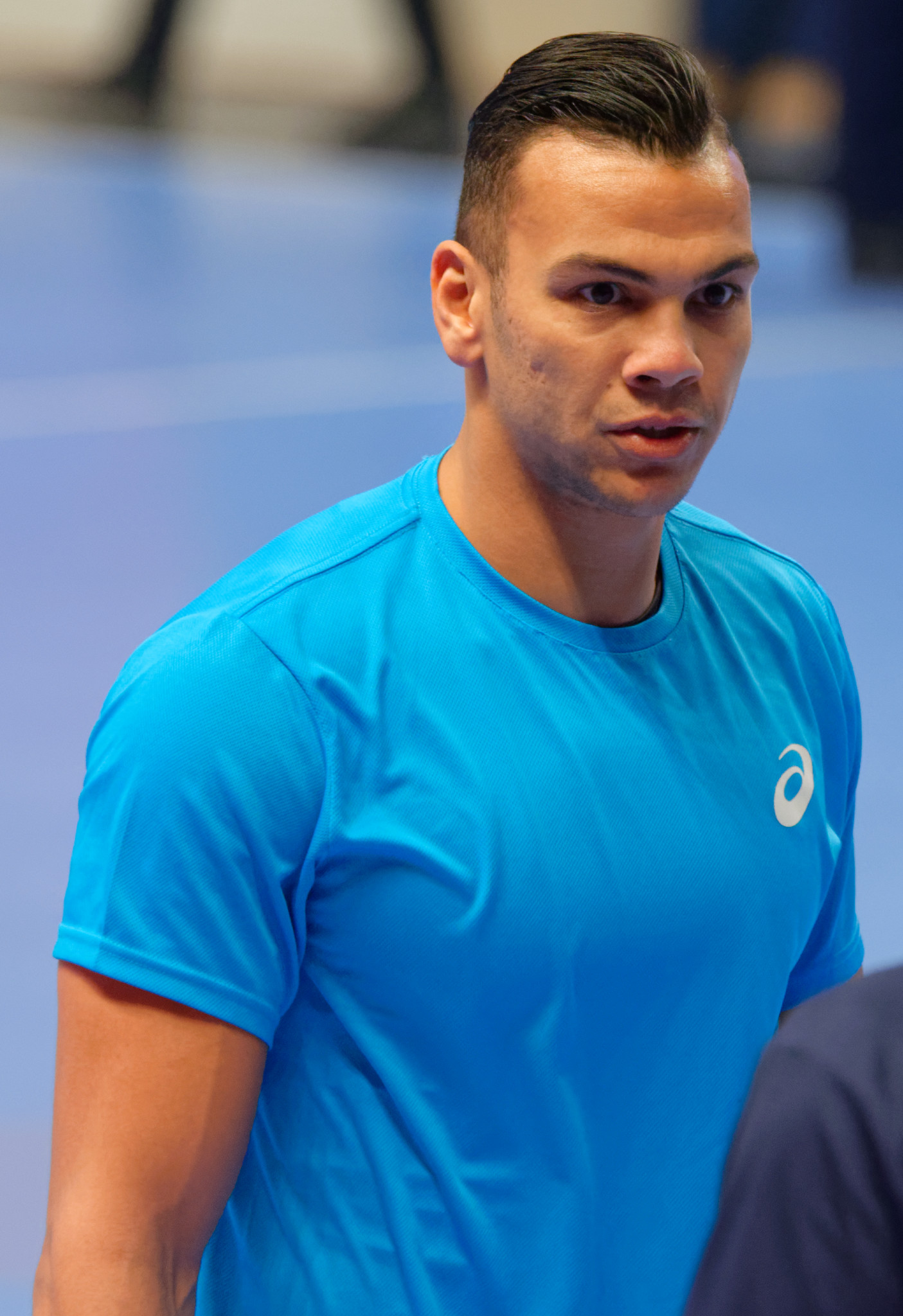
- Mamdouh in 2018

Personal information
- Nationality: Egyptian
- Born: 1 April 1989 (age 37) Cairo, Egypt
- Height: 1.91 m (6 ft 3 in)

Sport
- Sport: Handball
- Position: Pivot
- Current club: PAOK H.C.
- Number: 73
National team
Years	Team	Apps	(Gls)
2009–	Egypt	189	(522)
Medal record
African Championship
Gold medal – first place	2016 Egypt
Gold medal – first place	2020 Tunisia
Gold medal – first place	2024 Egypt
Mediterranean Games
Gold medal – first place	2013 Mersin	Team

Mohamed Mamdouh Hashem Shebib (Arabic: محمد ممدوح هاشم شبيب; born 1 April 1989) is an Egyptian handball player for PAOK H.C. and the Egyptian national team.

He represented Egypt at the World Men's Handball Championship in 2017, 2019 and 2021, and in the 2016 Summer Olympics in Rio de Janeiro, in the men's handball tournament.

== Honours ==
Club

Zamalek

- Egyptian Handball League
  - Winner: 2009–10, 2015–16
- Egyptian Handball Cup
  - Winner: 2016
- IHF Super Globe
  - Bronze Medal: 2010
- African Handball Champions League
  - Winner: 2010, 2011, 2015
- African Handball Cup Winners' Cup
  - Winner: 2010, 2011, 2016
- African Handball Super Cup
  - Winner: 2010, 2011, 2012
- Luxembourg International Handball Championship
  - Winner: 2015

El Jaish SC

- Qatar Handball League
  - Winner: 2013–14
- Emir of Qatar Cup
  - Winner: 2013–14
- Qatar Cup
  - Winner: 2014–15
- Asian Club League Handball Championship
  - Winner: 2013, 2014
- IHF Super Globe
  - Bronze Medal: 2013

Montpellier

- EHF Champions League
  - Winner: 2018
- Trophée des Champions
  - Winner: 2017–18

Dinamo București

- Liga Națională
  - Winner: 2021
- Romanian Cup
  - Winner: 2020, 2021
- Romanian Super Cup
  - Winner: 2020

International

Egypt

- African Games
  - Gold Medalist: 2015
- African Championship
  - Gold Medalist: 2016
  - Gold Medalist: 2020
  - Silver Medalist: 2010
  - Silver Medalist: 2018

Individual

- Best Pivot of the African Championship 2016, 2018
