= 2013 African Handball Cup Winners' Cup =

Tournament details
- Host country: Tunisia
- Venue(s): 3 (in 3 host cities)
- Dates: April 19–27
- Teams: 13 (from 1 confederation)

Final positions
- Champions: (Egypt) Al Ahly (1st title)
- Runner-up: (Tunisia) AS Hammamet
- Third place: (Tunisia) ES Sahel
- Fourth place: (Nigeria) Niger United

The 2013 African Handball Cup Winners' Cup was the 29th edition, organized by the African Handball Confederation, under the auspices of the International Handball Federation, the international handball sport governing body. The tournament was held from April 19–27, 2013 in Hammamet, Nabeul and Tazarka, in Tunisia, contested by 13 teams and won by Al Ahly of Egypt.

== Draw ==
Group A	Group B	Group C
(Libya) Al-Hilal (Tunisia) ES Sahel (Cameroon) FAP Yaoundé (Republic of the Congo) Munisport	(Egypt) Al Ahly (Burundi) Intwari (Nigeria) Niger United (Gabon) Salinas HC (Guinea) US Guinée	(Libya) Al-Ittihad (Tunisia) AS Hammamet (Democratic Republic of the Congo) JS Kinshasa (Algeria) JSE Skikda

== Preliminary rounds ==
=== Group A ===
Fri, 19 Apr 2013
ES Sahel (Tunisia)	40 : 32	(Cameroon) FAP Yaoundé
Munisport (Republic of the Congo)	28 : 30	(Libya) Al-Hilal
Sat, 20 Apr 2013
FAP Yaoundé (Cameroon)	24 : 20	(Republic of the Congo) Munisport
Al-Hilal (Libya)	16 : 32	(Tunisia) ES Sahel
Mon, 22 Apr 2013
ES Sahel (Tunisia)	34 : 21	(Republic of the Congo) Munisport
FAP Yaoundé (Cameroon)	30 : 29	(Libya) Al-Hilal

Team	Pld	W	D	L	GF	GA	GDIF	Pts
(Tunisia) ES Sahel	3	3	0	0	106	69	+37	6
(Cameroon) FAP Yaoundé	3	2	0	1	86	89	-3	4
(Libya) Al-Hilal	3	1	0	2	75	90	-15	2
(Republic of the Congo) Munisport	3	0	0	3	69	88	-19	0

* Note: Advance to quarter-finals
Relegated to 9-12th classification

=== Group B ===
Thu, 18 Apr 2013
Intwari (Burundi)	22 : 52	(Nigeria) Niger United
Salinas HC (Gabon)	20 : 0	(Guinea) US Guinée
Fri, 19 Apr 2013
Al Ahly (Egypt)	49 : 12	(Burundi) Intwari
Niger United (Nigeria)	20 : 20	(Gabon) Salinas HC
Sat, 20 Apr 2013
US Guinée (Guinea)	23 : 37	(Nigeria) Niger United
Salinas HC (Gabon)	12 : 31	(Egypt) Al Ahly
Sun, 21 Apr 2013
Al Ahly (Egypt)	50 : 19	(Guinea) US Guinée
Intwari (Burundi)	16 : 40	(Gabon) Salinas HC
Mon, 22 Apr 2013
Niger United (Nigeria)	25 : 34	(Egypt) Al Ahly
US Guinée (Guinea)	32 : 24	(Burundi) Intwari

Team	Pld	W	D	L	GF	GA	GDIF	Pts
(Egypt) Al Ahly	4	4	0	0	164	68	+96	8
(Nigeria) Niger United	4	2	1	1	134	99	+35	5
(Gabon) Salinas HC	4	2	1	1	92	67	+25	5
(Guinea) US Guinée **	4	1	0	3	74	131	-57	2
(Burundi) Intwari	4	0	0	4	74	173	-99	0

* Note: Advance to quarter-finals
Relegated to 9-12th classification
** Penalty for failing to pay participation fees

=== Group C ===
Fri, 19 Apr 2013
JSE Skikda (Algeria)	22 : 23	(Democratic Republic of the Congo) JS Kinshasa
AS Hammamet (Tunisia)	25 : 17	(Libya) Al-Ittihad
Sat, 20 Apr 2013
Al-Ittihad (Libya)	22 : 25	(Algeria) JSE Skikda
JS Kinshasa (Democratic Republic of the Congo)	25 : 38	(Tunisia) AS Hammamet
Mon, 22 Apr 2013
Al-Ittihad (Libya)	22 : 17	(Democratic Republic of the Congo) JS Kinshasa
JSE Skikda (Algeria)	31 : 31	(Tunisia) AS Hammamet

Team	Pld	W	D	L	GF	GA	GDIF	Pts
(Tunisia) AS Hammamet	3	2	1	0	94	73	+21	5
(Algeria) JSE Skikda	3	1	1	1	78	76	+2	3
(Libya) Al-Ittihad	3	1	0	2	61	67	-6	2
(Democratic Republic of the Congo) JS Kinshasa	3	1	0	2	65	82	-17	2

* Note: Advance to quarter-finals
Relegated to 9-12th classification

== Knockout stage ==
Championship bracket

Quarter-finals
Wed 24 Apr 2013
(Algeria) JSE Skikda	22
(Egypt) Al Ahly	24
Wed 24 Apr 2013
(Tunisia) ES Sahel	37
(Gabon) Salinas HC	14
Wed 24 Apr 2013
(Nigeria) Niger United	35
(Cameroon) FAP Yaoundé	30
Wed 24 Apr 2013
(Tunisia) AS Hammamet	36
(Libya) Al-Ittihad	27

Semi-finals
Thu 25 Apr 2013
(Egypt) Al Ahly	24
(Tunisia) ES Sahel	20
Thu 25 Apr 2013
(Tunisia) AS Hammamet	36
(Nigeria) Niger United	18

Final
Fri 26 Apr 2013
(Egypt) Al Ahly	31
(Tunisia) AS Hammamet	18
Third place
Fri 26 Apr 2013
(Tunisia) ES Sahel	33
(Nigeria) Niger United	24

5-8th bracket

5th-8th place
Thu 25 Apr 2013
(Libya) Al-Ittihad
(Cameroon) FAP Yaoundé
Thu 25 Apr 2013
(Gabon) Salinas HC	24
(Algeria) JSE Skikda	22

Fifth place
Fri 26 Apr 2013
(Libya) Al-Ittihad
(Gabon) Salinas HC
Seventh place
Fri 26 Apr 2013
(Algeria) JSE Skikda
(Cameroon) FAP Yaoundé

9-12th bracket

9th-12th place
Thu 25 Apr 2013
(Democratic Republic of the Congo) JS Kinshasa
Thu 25 Apr 2013
(Republic of the Congo) Munisport

Ninth place
Fri 26 Apr 2013
(Democratic Republic of the Congo) JS Kinshasa	25
(Republic of the Congo) Munisport	25
Eleventh place
Fri 26 Apr 2013
(Libya) Al-Hilal	30
(Guinea) US Guinée	29

== Final standings ==
Rank	Team	Record
Gold medal	(Egypt) Al Ahly	7–0
Silver medal	(Tunisia) AS Hammamet	4–1
Bronze medal	(Tunisia) ES Sahel	5–1
4	(Nigeria) Niger United	3–3
5	(Libya) Al-Ittihad	3–3
6	(Gabon) Salinas HC	3–3
7	(Algeria) JSE Skikda	2–3
8	(Cameroon) FAP Yaoundé	2–4
9	(Democratic Republic of the Congo) JS Kinshasa	2–2
10	(Republic of the Congo) Munisport	1–3
11	(Libya) Al-Hilal	2–3
12	(Guinea) US Guinée	1–5
13	(Burundi) Intwari	0–4

== Awards ==
2013 African Handball Cup Winner's Cup Winner

Al Ahly
1st title

Best player
