= Wael Jallouz =

Tunisian handball player (born 1991)

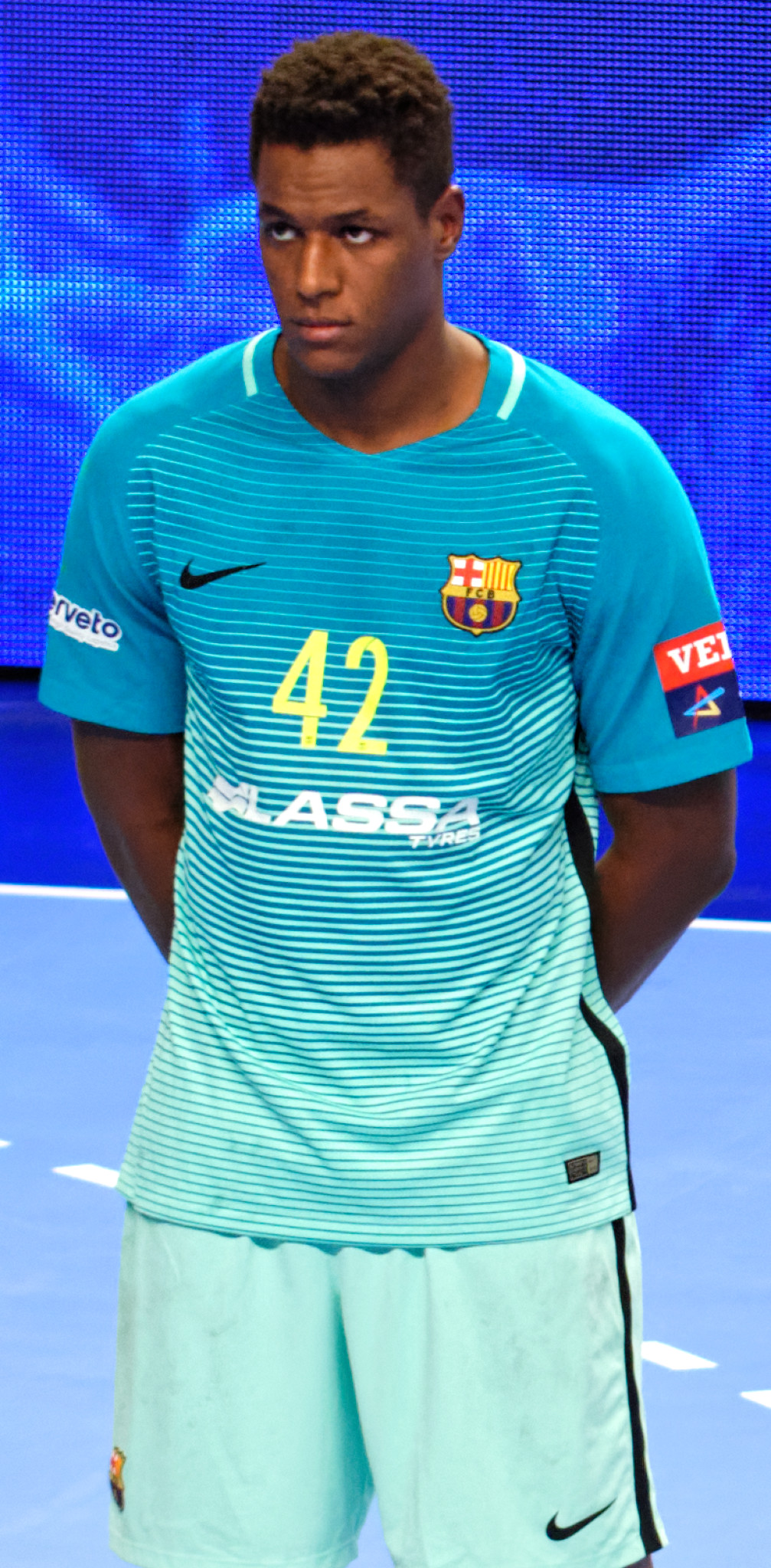
- Jallouz with FC Barcelona Handbol in 2016

Personal information
- Nationality: Tunisian
- Born: 3 May 1991 (age 35) Grombalia, Tunisia
- Height: 1.98 m (6 ft 6 in)

Sport
- Sport: Handball
- Position: Left back

Senior clubs
- Years: Team
- 2010–2013: AS Hammamet
- 2012: → Mudhar Club (loan)
- 2012: → Al Wahla (loan)
- 2012: → Espérance de Tunis (loan)
- 2013–2014: THW Kiel
- 2014–2020: FC Barcelona
- 2018: → Füchse Berlin (loan)
- 2019–2020: → C' Chartres MHB (loan)
- 2020–2021: Association Sportive d'Hammamet H.C.
- 2021–2022: Espérance de Tunis
National team
Years	Team	Apps	(Gls)
2010–2020	Tunisia	131	(335)
Medal record
Junior World Championship
Bronze medal – third place	2011 Greece

Wael Jallouz (born 3 May 1991) is a retired Tunisian handball player.

== Club career ==
Jallouz participated on the AS Hammamet team that won the Tunisian National Cup in 2012 after defeating in the final ES Sahel HC, the recent winner of the 2012 African Cup Winner's Cup, by 26–25. That was the club's first title since foundation in 1945.

He competed for Mudhar Club at the 2012 Super Globe where he scored 26 goals in five matches and was awarded man of the match against THW Kiel after scoring eight times. Kiel was so impressed, they offered him a contract for the following season.

== International career ==
Jallouz debuted for the Tunisian national team in 2010.

He was part of his country's squad at the 2012 Summer Olympics in London, where the team reached the quarter-finals, and the 2016 Summer Olympics.

== Honours ==
=== National team ===
Junior World Championship

- Bronze medalist: 2011 Greece

=== Club ===
IHF Super Globe

- Winner: 2014

German Bundesliga

- (gold) Winner: 2013–14

Supercopa ASOBAL

- (gold) Winner: 2014, 2015

Tunisia National Cup

- (gold) Winner: 2012

Supercopa Catalunya

- (gold) Winner: 2014, 2015

Copa ASOBAL

- (gold) Winner: 2014–15
