= 2016 African Handball Super Cup =

Tournament details
- Host country: Western Sahara
- Venue(s): 1 (in 1 host city)
- Dates: 4 May 2016
- Teams: 4 (from 4 confederations)

Final positions
- Champions: (Tunisia) Espérance (2nd title) (Angola) 1º de Agosto (2nd title)
- Runner-up: (Egypt) Zamalek (Ivory Coast) Africa Sports

Tournament statistics
- Matches played: 2
- Goals scored: 122 (61 per match)

The 2016 African Handball Super Cup (22nd edition), also known as Babacar Fall Super Cup, in honour of the first chairman of the African Handball Confederation, was a handball competition organized by the African Handball Confederation, under the auspices of the International Handball Federation, the handball sport governing body. The matches, held on 5 May 2016 in Laayoune, Western Sahara, were contested by Zamalek, the 2015 African Handball Champions League winner and Espérance Sportive de Tunis, the 2015 African Handball Cup Winners' Cup winner, on the man's side and Clube Desportivo Primeiro de Agosto, the 2015 African Women's Handball Champions League winner and Africa Sports National, the 2015 African Women's Handball Cup Winners' Cup runner-up. ES Tunis, on the man's side and Primeiro de Agosto, on the woman's side, were the winners.

Espérance de Tunis and Primeiro de Agosto qualified for the 2016 IHF Super Globe.

== 2016 Africa Men's Handball Super Cup ==
Tue, 4 May 2016
18:00 WEST (UTC+1)
Espérance (Tunisia)
33–32 (ET)
(Egypt) Zamalek
Laayoune, Western Sahara

(10–09)

FT: 26–26 ET: 7–6

== 2016 Africa Women's Handball Super Cup ==
Tue, 4 May 2016; 16:00 WEST (UTC+1)	1º de Agosto (Angola)	33–14	(Ivory Coast) Africa Sports	Laayoune, Western Sahara
Tue, 4 May 2016; 16:00 WEST (UTC+1)		(15–07)		Laayoune, Western Sahara

== Awards ==
2016 Africa Men's Handball Super Cup Winners	2016 Africa Women's Handball Super Cup Winners
Espérance Sportive de Tunis; 2nd title	Clube Desportivo Primeiro de Agosto; 2nd title

== See also ==
- 2015 African Handball Champions League
- 2015 African Women's Handball Champions League
- 2015 African Handball Cup Winners' Cup
- 2015 African Women's Handball Cup Winners' Cup
