= 2018 African Handball Cup Winners' Cup =

Tournament details
- Host country: Egypt
- Venue: 1 (in 1 host city)
- Dates: April 13–22, 2018
- Teams: 14 (from 1 confederation)

Final positions
- Champions: (Egypt) Al Ahly SC (3rd title)
- Runners-up: (Libya) Al-Ittihad
- Third place: (Morocco) Widad Smara
- Fourth place: (Democratic Republic of the Congo) JS Kinshasa

Tournament statistics
- Matches played: 35
- Goals scored: 1,898 (54.23 per match)

The 2018 African Handball Cup Winners' Cup was the 24th edition, organized by the African Handball Confederation, under the auspices of the International Handball Federation, the handball sport governing body. The tournament was held from April 13–22, 2018 and took place in Cairo, Egypt, contested by 14 teams and won by Al Ahly SC of Egypt.

== Draw ==
Group A	Group B	Group C	Group D
(Democratic Republic of the Congo) JS Kinshasa (Ethiopia) Kembata Durame; Phoenix Gabon (Morocco) Widad Smara	(Cameroon) FAP Yaoundé (Republic of the Congo) Inter Club (Egypt) Sporting	(Egypt) Heliopolis (Democratic Republic of the Congo) JS Lubumbashi (Ethiopia) Kirkos (Ivory Coast) Red Star	(Egypt) Al Ahly SC (Libya) Al-Ittihad (Cameroon) AS Minuh

== Preliminary rounds ==
Times given below are in EET (UTC+2).

=== Group A ===
Fri, 13 Apr 2018
13:30	Widad Smara (Morocco)	24 (14:09) 25	Phoenix Gabon
13:30	JS Kinshasa (Democratic Republic of the Congo)	67 (33:09) 19	(Ethiopia) Kembata
Sun, 15 Apr 2018
15:00	Kembata (Ethiopia)	27 (07:21) 52	(Morocco) Widad Smara
15:00	Phoenix Gabon	26 (15:15) 33	(Democratic Republic of the Congo) JS Kinshasa
Tue, 17 Apr 2018
11:00	Phoenix Gabon	53 (10:15) 12	(Ethiopia) Kembata
13:00	Widad Smara (Morocco)	28 (14:16) 25	(Democratic Republic of the Congo) JS Kinshasa

Team	Pld	W	D	L	GF	GA	GDIF	Pts
(Democratic Republic of the Congo) JS Kinshasa	3	2	0	1	125	73	+52	6
(Morocco) Widad Smara	3	2	0	1	104	77	+27	4
Phoenix Gabon	3	2	0	1	104	69	+35	6
(Ethiopia) Kembata	3	0	0	3	58	172	-114	0

* Note: Advance to quarter-finals
Relegated to 9th classification

=== Group B ===
Sat, 14 Apr 2018
15:00	Sporting (Egypt)	37 (17:13) 20	(Republic of the Congo) Inter Club
Sun, 15 Apr 2018
19:00	Inter Club (Republic of the Congo)	19 (11:14) 21	(Cameroon) FAP Yaoundé
Tue, 17 Apr 2018
17:00	Sporting (Egypt)	25 (12:13) 27	(Cameroon) FAP Yaoundé

Team	Pld	W	D	L	GF	GA	GDIF	Pts
(Cameroon) FAP Yaoundé	2	2	0	0	48	44	+4	2
(Egypt) Sporting	2	1	0	1	62	47	+15	4
(Republic of the Congo) Inter Club	2	0	0	2	39	58	-19	0

* Note: Advance to quarter-finals
Relegated to 9th classification

=== Group C ===
Fri, 13 Apr 2018
10:30	Heliopolis (Egypt)	34 (13:09) 24	(Democratic Republic of the Congo) JS Lubumbashi
13:30	Red Star (Ivory Coast)	46 (24:04) 16	(Ethiopia) Kirkos
Sun, 15 Apr 2018
11:00	Kirkos (Ethiopia)	20 (07:24) 41	(Egypt) Heliopolis
13:00	JS Lubumbashi (Democratic Republic of the Congo)	17 (07:13) 27	(Ivory Coast) Red Star
Tue, 17 Apr 2018
15:00	Heliopolis (Egypt)	26 (12:12) 24	(Ivory Coast) Red Star
15:00	JS Lubumbashi (Democratic Republic of the Congo)	29 (15:13) 25	(Ethiopia) Kirkos

Team	Pld	W	D	L	GF	GA	GDIF	Pts
(Egypt) Heliopolis	3	3	0	0	101	68	+33	6
(Ivory Coast) Red Star	3	2	0	1	97	59	+38	4
(Democratic Republic of the Congo) JS Lubumbashi	3	2	0	1	70	86	-16	2
(Ethiopia) Kirkos	3	0	0	3	61	116	-55	0

* Note: Advance to quarter-finals
Relegated to 9th classification

=== Group D ===
Fri, 13 Apr 2018
18:00	Al Ahly (Egypt)	28 (11:08) 15	(Cameroon) AS Minuh
Sun, 15 Apr 2018
17:00	AS Minuh (Cameroon)	26 (14:16) 31	(Libya) Al-Ittihad
Tue, 17 Apr 2018
19:00	Al-Ittihad (Libya)	20 (11:15) 28	(Egypt) Al Ahly

Team	Pld	W	D	L	GF	GA	GDIF	Pts
(Egypt) Al Ahly	2	2	0	0	56	35	+21	4
(Libya) Al-Ittihad	2	1	0	1	51	54	-3	2
(Cameroon) AS Minuh	2	0	0	2	41	59	-18	0

* Note: Advance to quarter-finals
Relegated to 9th classification

== Knockout stage ==
=== 13th place match ===
Thu, 19 Apr 2018
11:00	Kembata (Ethiopia)	32 (15:15) 33	(Ethiopia) Kirkos

=== Championship bracket ===
Quarter-finals
Thu 19 Apr 2018 – 13:00
(Cameroon) FAP Yaoundé	27
(Morocco) Widad Smara	31
Thu 19 Apr 2018 – 15:00
(Egypt) Heliopolis	24
(Libya) Al-Ittihad	25
Thu 19 Apr 2018 – 17:00
(Democratic Republic of the Congo) JS Kinshasa	35
(Egypt) Sporting	29
Thu 19 Apr 2018 – 19:00
(Egypt) Al Ahly	41
(Ivory Coast) Red Star	17

Semi-finals
Sat 21 Apr 2018 – 17:00
(Democratic Republic of the Congo) JS Kinshasa	22
(Libya) Al-Ittihad	23
Sat 21 Apr 2018 – 19:00
(Morocco) Widad Smara	19
(Egypt) Al Ahly	37

Final
Sun 22 Apr 2018 – 20:30
(Egypt) Al Ahly	25
(Libya) Al-Ittihad	12
Third place
Sun 22 Apr 2018 – 13:00
(Democratic Republic of the Congo) JS Kinshasa	23
(Morocco) Widad Smara	24

=== 5-8th bracket ===
5th-8th place
Sat 21 Apr 2018 – 13:00
(Cameroon) FAP Yaoundé	23
(Ivory Coast) Red Star	29
Sat 21 Apr 2018 – 15:00
(Egypt) Sporting	30
(Egypt) Heliopolis	21

Fifth place
Sun 22 Apr 2018 – 11:00
(Ivory Coast) Red Star	31
(Egypt) Sporting	33
Seventh place
Sun 22 Apr 2018 – 09:00
(Egypt) Heliopolis	29
(Cameroon) FAP Yaoundé	34

=== 9-12th place ===
Semi-finals
Thu 19 Apr 2018 – 09:00
Phoenix Gabon	23
(Republic of the Congo) Inter Club	16
Thu 19 Apr 2018 – 11:00
(Democratic Republic of the Congo) JS Lubumbashi	20
(Cameroon) AS Minuh	29

Ninth place
Sat 21 Apr 2018 – 11:00
Phoenix Gabon	18
(Cameroon) AS Minuh	24
Third place
Sat 21 Apr 2018 – 11:00
(Republic of the Congo) Inter Club	27
(Democratic Republic of the Congo) JS Lubumbashi	15

== Final standings ==
Rank	Team	Record
Gold medal	(Egypt) Al Ahly SC	5–0
Silver medal	(Libya) Al-Ittihad	3–2
Bronze medal	(Morocco) Widad Smara	4–2
4	(Democratic Republic of the Congo) JS Kinshasa	3–3
5	(Egypt) Sporting	3–2
6	(Ivory Coast) Red Star	3–3
7	(Cameroon) FAP Yaoundé	3–2
8	(Egypt) Heliopolis	3–3
9	(Cameroon) AS Minuh	2–2
10	Phoenix Gabon	3–2
11	(Republic of the Congo) Inter Club	1–3
12	(Democratic Republic of the Congo) JS Lubumbashi	2–3
13	(Ethiopia) Kirkos	1–3
14	(Ethiopia) Kembata	0–4

== Awards ==
2018 African Handball Cup Winners' Cup Winner

Al Ahly Sport Club
3rd title

Best Player

== See also ==
2018 African Handball Champions League
