= 2015 African Handball Cup Winners' Cup =

Tournament details
- Host country: Gabon
- Venue(s): 2 (in 1 host city)
- Dates: May 15–24
- Teams: 12 (from 1 confederation)

Final positions
- Champions: (Tunisia) Espérance Tunis (3rd title)
- Runner-up: (Egypt) Al Ahly
- Third place: (Tunisia) Club Africain
- Fourth place: (Gabon) Stade Mandji

Tournament statistics
- Matches played: 46
- Goals scored: 2,401 (52.2 per match)

The 2015 African Handball Cup Winners' Cup was the 21st edition, organized by the African Handball Confederation, under the auspices of the International Handball Federation, the handball sport governing body. The tournament was held from May 15–24, 2015 in Libreville, Gabon, contested by 12 teams and won by Espérance de Tunis.

== Draw ==
Group A	Group B
(Egypt) Al Ahly (Tunisia) Club Africain (Cameroon) Fanz (Republic of the Congo) Inter Club (Democratic Republic of the Congo) JS Kinshasa (Gabon) Stade Mandji	(Republic of the Congo) Diables Noires (Tunisia) Espérance Tunis (Cameroon) FAP Yaoundé (Benin) RC Flowers (Gabon) JS Mouila (Democratic Republic of the Congo) AC Scorpion

== Preliminary rounds ==
Times given below are in WAT UTC+1.

=== Group A ===
Fri, 15 May 2015
JS Kinshasa (Democratic Republic of the Congo)	16 (05:13) 23	(Republic of the Congo) Inter Club
Al Ahly (Egypt)	31 (13:06) 26	(Cameroon) Fanz
Club Africain (Tunisia)	30 (14:14) 28	(Gabon) Stade Mandji
Sat, 16 May 2015
Stade Mandji (Gabon)	24 (05:10) 18	(Democratic Republic of the Congo) JS Kinshasa
Fanz (Cameroon)	17 (12:07) 24	(Tunisia) Club Africain
Inter Club (Republic of the Congo)	22 (09:16) 30	(Egypt) Al Ahly
Sun, 17 May 2015
Fanz (Cameroon)	21 (10:10) 22	(Republic of the Congo) Inter Club
Club Africain (Tunisia)	20 (14:11) 21	(Democratic Republic of the Congo) JS Kinshasa
Al Ahly (Egypt)	34 (18:16) 31	(Gabon) Stade Mandji
Tue, 19 May 2015
JS Kinshasa (Democratic Republic of the Congo)	25 (13:13) 26	(Egypt) Al Ahly
Stade Mandji (Gabon)	27 (11:14) 25	(Cameroon) Fanz
Club Africain (Tunisia)	32 (19:11) 19	(Republic of the Congo) Inter Club
Wed, 20 May 2015
Al Ahly (Egypt)	28 (11:09) 24	(Tunisia) Club Africain
JS Kinshasa (Democratic Republic of the Congo)	27 (17:09) 23	(Cameroon) Fanz
Inter Club (Republic of the Congo)	24 (12:14) 32	(Gabon) Stade Mandji

Team	Pld	W	D	L	GF	GA	GDIF	Pts
(Egypt) Al Ahly	5	5	0	0	149	128	+21	10
(Tunisia) Club Africain	5	3	0	2	130	113	+17	6
(Gabon) Stade Mandji	5	3	0	2	142	131	+11	6
(Republic of the Congo) Inter Club	5	2	0	3	110	131	-21	4
(Democratic Republic of the Congo) JS Kinshasa	5	2	0	3	107	116	-9	4
(Cameroon) Fanz	5	0	0	5	112	131	-19	0

* Note: Advance to quarter-finals
Relegated to 9-12th classification

=== Group B ===
Fri, 15 May 2015
FAP Yaoundé (Cameroon)	28 (16:14) 27	(Republic of the Congo) Diables Noires
AC Scorpion (Democratic Republic of the Congo)	11 (06:19) 37	(Tunisia) Espérance Tunis
JS Mouila (Gabon)	25 (09:16) 33	(Benin) RC Flowers
Sat, 16 May 2015
JS Mouila (Gabon)	31 (15:10) 21	(Democratic Republic of the Congo) AC Scorpion
Diables Noires (Republic of the Congo)	25 (14:21) 35	(Tunisia) Espérance Tunis
RC Flowers (Benin)	25 (12:16) 25	(Cameroon) FAP Yaoundé
Sun, 17 May 2015
FAP Yaoundé (Cameroon)	37 (13:10) 24	(Democratic Republic of the Congo) AC Scorpion
RC Flowers (Benin)	31 (16:11) 26	(Republic of the Congo) Diables Noires
Espérance Tunis (Tunisia)	31 (14:08) 21	(Gabon) JS Mouila
Tue, 19 May 2015
AC Scorpion (Democratic Republic of the Congo)	12 (04:10) 25	(Republic of the Congo) Diables Noires
Espérance Tunis (Tunisia)	30 (14:21) 17	(Benin) RC Flowers
FAP Yaoundé (Cameroon)	34 (12:14) 30	(Gabon) JS Mouila
Wed, 20 May 2015
AC Scorpion (Democratic Republic of the Congo)	25 (10:20) 41	(Benin) RC Flowers
Diables Noires (Republic of the Congo)	37 (14:12) 26	(Gabon) JS Mouila
Espérance Tunis (Tunisia)	31 (14:08) 23	(Cameroon) FAP Yaoundé

Team	Pld	W	D	L	GF	GA	GDIF	Pts
(Tunisia) Espérance Tunis	5	5	0	0	164	95	+69	10
(Benin) RC Flowers	5	3	1	1	147	131	+16	7
(Cameroon) FAP Yaoundé	5	3	1	1	147	137	+10	7
(Republic of the Congo) Diables Noires	5	2	0	3	138	132	+6	4
(Gabon) JS Mouila	5	1	0	4	133	156	-23	2
(Democratic Republic of the Congo) AC Scorpion	5	0	0	5	93	171	-78	0

* Note: Advance to quarter-finals
Relegated to 9-12th classification

== Knockout stage ==
Championship bracket

Quarter-finals
Thu 21 May – 17:00
(Tunisia) Espérance Tunis	26
(Republic of the Congo) Inter Club	24
Thu 21 May – 19:00
(Tunisia) Club Africain	27
(Cameroon) FAP Yaoundé	22
Thu 21 May – 17:00
(Egypt) Al Ahly	25
(Republic of the Congo) Diables Noires	23
Thu 21 May – 13:00
(Gabon) Stade Mandji	28
(Benin) RC Flowers	24

Semi-finals
Sat 23 May – 13:00
(Tunisia) Espérance Tunis	34
(Tunisia) Club Africain	33
Sat 23 May – 18:00
(Egypt) Al Ahly	29
(Gabon) Stade Mandji	23

Final
Sun 24 May – 18:00
(Tunisia) Espérance Tunis	27
(Egypt) Al Ahly	26
Third place
Sun 24 May – 12:30
(Tunisia) Club Africain	24
(Gabon) Stade Mandji	23

5-8th bracket

5th-8th place
Fri 22 May – 17:30
(Cameroon) FAP Yaoundé	27
(Republic of the Congo) Inter Club	26
Fri 22 May – 12:30
(Benin) RC Flowers	30
(Republic of the Congo) Diables Noires	26

Fifth place
Sat 23 May – 14:00
(Cameroon) FAP Yaoundé	33
(Benin) RC Flowers	24
Seventh place
Sat 23 May – 10:00
(Republic of the Congo) Diables Noires	24
(Republic of the Congo) Inter Club	22

9-12th bracket

9th-12th place
Thu 21 May – 11:00
(Cameroon) Fanz	22
(Gabon) JS Mouila	18
Thu 21 May – 13:00
(Democratic Republic of the Congo) JS Kinshasa	27
(Democratic Republic of the Congo) AC Scorpion	21

Ninth place
Fri 22 May – 12:30
(Cameroon) Fanz	25
(Democratic Republic of the Congo) JS Kinshasa	24
Eleventh place
Fri 22 May – 10:00
(Democratic Republic of the Congo) AC Scorpion	25
(Gabon) JS Mouila	23

== Final standings ==
Rank	Team	Record
Gold medal	(Tunisia) Espérance Tunis	8–0
Silver medal	(Egypt) Al Ahly	7–1
Bronze medal	(Tunisia) Club Africain	5–3
4	(Gabon) Stade Mandji	4–4
5	(Cameroon) FAP Yaoundé	5–2
6	(Benin) RC Flowers	4–3
7	(Republic of the Congo) Diables Noires	3–5
8	(Republic of the Congo) Inter Club	2–6
9	(Cameroon) Fanz	2–5
10	(Democratic Republic of the Congo) JS Kinshasa	3–4
11	(Democratic Republic of the Congo) AC Scorpion	1–3
12	(Gabon) JS Mouila	1–4

== Awards ==
2015 African Handball Cup Winner's Cup Winner

Espérance Sportive de Tunis
3rd title

Most Valuable Player

== See also ==
- 2015 African Handball Champions League
