= 2021 African Handball Cup Winners' Cup =

Tournament details
- Host country: Morocco
- Venue: 1 (in 1 host city)
- Dates: 24 Aug- 2 Sep, 2021
- Teams: 8 (from 1 confederation)

Final positions
- Champions: (Egypt) Al Ahly SC (4th title)
- Runners-up: (Morocco) Widad Smara
- Third place: (Republic of the Congo) Inter Club Brazzaville (handball)
- Fourth place: (Democratic Republic of the Congo) JS Kinshasa

Tournament statistics
- Matches played: 11

The 2021 African Handball Cup Winners' Cup was the 26th edition, organized by the African Handball Confederation, under the auspices of the International Handball Federation, the handball sport governing body. The tournament was held from 24 August till 2 September 2021 and took place in Meknes, Morocco, contested by 8 teams and won by Al Ahly SC of Egypt.

== Draw ==
Group A	Group B
(Egypt) Al Ahly SC (Ivory Coast) Red Star (Cameroon) FAP Yaoundé (Nigeria) Rima Sokoto HC	(Morocco) Widad Smara (Republic of the Congo) Inter Club (Democratic Republic of the Congo) JS Kinshasa (Senegal) ASFA

== Preliminary rounds ==
=== Group A ===
Tue, 24 Aug 2021
Al Ahly SC (Egypt)	46 (22:12) 26	(Nigeria) Rima Sokoto HC
Red Star (Ivory Coast)	10 0	(Cameroon) FAP Yaoundé
Thu, 26 Aug 2021
FAP Yaoundé (Cameroon)	35 (13:16) 25	(Nigeria) Rima Sokoto HC
Al Ahly SC (Egypt)	45 (23:11) 26	(Ivory Coast) Red Star
Sat, 28 Aug 2021
Red Star (Ivory Coast)	39 (17:16) 32	(Nigeria) Rima Sokoto HC
Al Ahly SC (Egypt)	48 (22:11) 23	(Cameroon) FAP Yaoundé

Team	Pld	W	D	L	GF	GA	GDIF	Pts
(Egypt) Al Ahly SC	3	2	0	1	139	75	+64	6
(Ivory Coast) Red Star	3	2	0	1	75	77	-2	4
(Cameroon) FAP Yaoundé	3	1	0	2	55	84	-28	2
(Nigeria) Rima Sokoto HC	3	0	0	3	83	117	-34	0

* Note: Advance to quarter-finals

=== Group B ===
Tue, 24 Aug 2021
Inter Club (Republic of the Congo)	28 (16:10) 20	(Democratic Republic of the Congo) JS Kinshasa
Widad Smara (Morocco)	30 (12:9) 18	(Senegal) ASFA
Thu, 26 Aug 2021
JS Kinshasa (Democratic Republic of the Congo)	42 (23:13) 29	(Senegal) ASFA
Widad Smara (Morocco)	26 (15:14) 25	(Republic of the Congo) Inter Club
SAT, 28 Aug 2021
Inter Club (Republic of the Congo)	47 (26:11) 22	(Senegal) ASFA
Widad Smara (Morocco)	30 (14:10) 22	(Democratic Republic of the Congo) JS Kinshasa

Team	Pld	W	D	L	GF	GA	GDIF	Pts
(Morocco) Widad Smara	3	3	0	0	86	65	+21	6
(Republic of the Congo) Inter Club	3	2	0	1	100	71	+29	4
(Democratic Republic of the Congo) JS Kinshasa	3	1	0	2	87	87	0	2
(Senegal) ASFA	3	0	0	3	69	119	-50	0

* Note: Advance to quarter-finals

=== Championship bracket ===
Quarter-finals
Thu 30 Aug 2021
(Egypt) Al Ahly	49
(Senegal) ASFA	22
Thu 30 Aug 2021
(Ivory Coast) Red Star	21
(Democratic Republic of the Congo) JS Kinshasa	26
Thu 30 Aug 2021
(Republic of the Congo) Inter Club	31
(Cameroon) FAP Yaoundé	29
Thu 30 Aug 2021
(Morocco) Widad Smara	47
(Nigeria) Rima Sokoto HC	27

Semi-finals
Sat 1 Sep 2021
(Egypt) Al Ahly	34
(Republic of the Congo) Inter Club	30
Sat 1 Sep 2021
(Morocco) Widad Smara	30
(Democratic Republic of the Congo) JS Kinshasa	22

Final
Thu 2 Sep 2021
(Egypt) Al Ahly	29
(Morocco) Widad Smara	24
Third place
Thu 2 Sep 2021
(Republic of the Congo) Inter Club	29
(Democratic Republic of the Congo) JS Kinshasa	28

== Final standings ==
Rank	Team
Gold medal	(Egypt) Al Ahly SC
Silver medal	(Morocco) Widad Smara
Bronze medal	(Republic of the Congo) Inter Club
4	(Democratic Republic of the Congo) JS Kinshasa

== Awards ==
2021 African Handball Cup Winners' Cup Winner

Al Ahly Sport Club
4th title

Best Player
