= 2011 African Handball Champions League =

Sports competition

Tournament details
- Host country: Nigeria
- Venue(s): 2 (in 1 host city)
- Dates: October 21–30
- Teams: 13

Final positions
- Champions: (Egypt) Zamalek (8th title)
- Runner-up: (Tunisia) Étoile du Sahel
- Third place: (Angola) 1º de Agosto
- Fourth place: (Algeria) JSE Skikda

The 2011 African Handball Champions League was the 33rd edition, organized by the African Handball Confederation, under the auspices of the International Handball Federation, the handball sport governing body. The tournament was held from October 21–30, 2011 in Kaduna, Nigeria, contested by 13 teams and won by Al Zamalek Cairo of Egypt.

== Draw ==
Group A	Group B	Group C
(Cameroon) FAP Yaoundé (Algeria) GS Pétroliers (Nigeria) Safety Shooters (Egypt) Zamalek	(Egypt) Al Ahly (Tunisia) Étoile du Sahel (Democratic Republic of the Congo) JS Kinshasa (Ivory Coast) Red Star	(Republic of the Congo) Étoile du Congo (Benin) Flowers (Algeria) JSE Skikda (Nigeria) Niger United (Angola) Primeiro de Agosto

== Preliminary round ==
Times given below are in WAT UTC+1.

=== Group A ===
Fri/Tue, 21/25 Oct 2011
FAP Yaoundé (Cameroon)	21 : 31	(Nigeria) Safety Shooters
GS Pétroliers (Algeria)	24 : 18	(Egypt) Zamalek
Sat/Mon, 22/24 Oct 2011
Zamalek (Egypt)	27 : 27	(Cameroon) FAP Yaoundé
GS Pétroliers (Algeria)	21 : 16	(Nigeria) Safety Shooters
Sun, 23 Oct 2011
FAP Yaoundé (Cameroon)	20 : 20	(Algeria) GS Pétroliers
Zamalek (Egypt)	32 : 24	(Nigeria) Safety Shooters

Team	Pld	W	D	L	GF	GA	GDIF	Pts
(Algeria) GS Pétroliers	3	2	1	0	65	54	+11	5
(Egypt) Zamalek	3	1	1	1	77	75	+2	3
(Nigeria) Safety Shooters	3	1	0	2	71	74	-3	2
(Cameroon) FAP Yaoundé	3	0	2	1	68	78	-10	2

* Note: Advance to quarter-finals
Relegated to 9-13th place classification

=== Group B ===
Sat/Mon, 22/24 Oct 2011
Al Ahly (Egypt)	23 : 5	(Democratic Republic of the Congo) JS Kinshasa
ES Sahel (Tunisia)	30 : 15	(Ivory Coast) Red Star
Sun, 23 Oct 2011
JS Kinshasa (Democratic Republic of the Congo)	17 : 46	(Tunisia) ES Sahel
Red Star (Ivory Coast)	27 : 39	(Egypt) Al Ahly
Tue, 25 Oct 2011
ES Sahel (Tunisia)	25 : 26	(Egypt) Al Ahly
JS Kinshasa (Democratic Republic of the Congo)	:	(Ivory Coast) Red Star

Team	Pld	W	D	L	GF	GA	GDIF	Pts
(Egypt) Al Ahly	3	3	0	0	88	57	+31	6
(Tunisia) ES Sahel	3	2	0	1	101	58	+43	4
(Ivory Coast) Red Star	2	0	0	2	42	69	-27	0
(Democratic Republic of the Congo) JS Kinshasa	2	0	0	2	22	69	-47	0

* Note: Advance to quarter-finals
Relegated to 9-13th place classification

=== Group C ===
Fri, 21 Oct 2011
Flowers (Benin)	23 : 34	(Algeria) JSE Skikda
Étoile du Congo (Republic of the Congo)	35 : 31	(Nigeria) Niger United
Sat, 22 Oct 2011
1º de Agosto (Angola)	40 : 18	(Republic of the Congo) Étoile du Congo
Niger United (Nigeria)	32 : 30	(Benin) Flowers
Sun, 23 Oct 2011
JSE Skikda (Algeria)	30 : 26	(Republic of the Congo) Étoile du Congo
Niger United (Nigeria)	21 : 33	(Angola) 1º de Agosto
Mon, 24 Oct 2011
1º de Agosto (Angola)	41 : 25	(Benin) Flowers
JSE Skikda (Algeria)	30 : 25	(Nigeria) Niger United
Tue, 25 Oct 2011
Étoile du Congo (Republic of the Congo)	24 : 24	(Benin) Flowers
JSE Skikda (Algeria)	23 : 29	(Angola) 1º de Agosto

Team	Pld	W	D	L	GF	GA	GDIF	Pts
(Angola) 1º de Agosto	4	4	0	0	143	87	+56	8
(Algeria) JSE Skikda	4	3	0	1	117	103	+14	6
(Republic of the Congo) Étoile du Congo	4	1	1	2	103	125	-22	3
(Nigeria) Niger United	4	1	0	3	109	128	-19	2
(Benin) Flowers	4	0	1	3	102	131	-29	1

* Note: Advance to quarter-finals
Relegated to 9-13th place classification

== Knockout stage ==
Championship bracket

Quarter-finals
Thu 27 Oct 2011 – 10:00
(Angola) 1º de Agosto	30
(Republic of the Congo) Étoile du Congo	21
Thu 27 Oct 2011 – 13:00
(Algeria) JSE Skikda	28
(Nigeria) Safety Shooters	25
Thu 27 Oct 2011 – 17:00
(Algeria) GS Pétroliers	17
(Tunisia) ES Sahel	23
Thu 27 Oct 2011 – 19:00
(Egypt) Al Ahly	24
(Egypt) Zamalek	30

Semi-finals
Fri 28 Oct 2011 – 15:30
(Angola) 1º de Agosto	21
(Tunisia) ES Sahel	22
Fri 28 Oct 2011 – 19:00
(Algeria) JSE Skikda	25
(Egypt) Zamalek	28

Final
Sun 30 Oct 2011 – 12:00
(Tunisia) ES Sahel	24
(Egypt) Zamalek	27
Third place
Sun 30 Oct 2011 – 11:00
(Angola) 1º de Agosto	26
(Algeria) JSE Skikda	20

5-8th bracket

5–8th place
Fri 28 Oct 2011 -
(Egypt) Al Ahly	41
(Nigeria) Safety Shooters	22
Fri 28 Oct 2011 -
(Algeria) GS Pétroliers	28
(Republic of the Congo) Étoile du Congo	21

Fifth place
Sat 29 Oct 2011 – 12:00
(Algeria) GS Pétroliers	24
(Egypt) Al Ahly	27
Seventh place
Sat 29 Oct 2011 – 10:30
(Republic of the Congo) Étoile du Congo	34
(Nigeria) Safety Shooters	27

9–13th classification

26 October 2011
Red Star (Ivory Coast)	35 : 18	(Democratic Republic of the Congo) JS Kinshasa
FAP Yaoundé (Cameroon)	30 : 32	(Nigeria) Niger United
27 October 2011
Flowers (Benin)	35 : 32	(Democratic Republic of the Congo) JS Kinshasa
Red Star (Ivory Coast)	30 : 21	(Cameroon) FAP Yaoundé
28 October 2011
FAP Yaoundé (Cameroon)	32 : 23	(Benin) Flowers
Niger United (Nigeria)	28 : 30	(Ivory Coast) Red Star
29 October 2011
Flowers (Benin)	32 : 42	(Ivory Coast) Red Star
JS Kinshasa (Democratic Republic of the Congo)	23 : 19	(Nigeria) Niger United
30 October 2011
JS Kinshasa (Democratic Republic of the Congo)	24 : 39	(Cameroon) FAP Yaoundé
Flowers (Benin)	33 : 29	(Nigeria) Niger United

P	Team	Pld	W	D	L	GF	GA	GDIF	Pts
9	(Ivory Coast) Red Star	4	4	0	0	137	99	+38	8
10	(Cameroon) FAP Yaoundé	4	2	0	2	122	109	+13	2
11	(Benin) Flowers	4	2	0	2	123	135	-12	2
12	(Democratic Republic of the Congo) JS Kinshasa	4	1	0	3	97	128	-31	1
13	(Nigeria) Niger United	4	1	0	3	108	116	-8	1

== Final ranking ==
Rank	Team	Record
Gold medal	(Egypt) Zamalek	4–1
Silver medal	(Tunisia) Étoile du Sahel	4–2
Bronze medal	(Angola) Primeiro de Agosto	6–1
4	(Algeria) JSE Skikda	4–3
5	(Egypt) Al Ahly	5–1
6	(Algeria) GS Pétroliers	3–2
7	(Republic of the Congo) Étoile du Congo	2–4
8	(Nigeria) Safety Shooters	1–5
9	(Ivory Coast) Red Star	4–2
10	(Cameroon) FAP Yaoundé	2–3
11	(Benin) Flowers	2–5
12	(Democratic Republic of the Congo) JS Kinshasa	1–5
13	(Nigeria) Niger United	2–6

== Awards ==
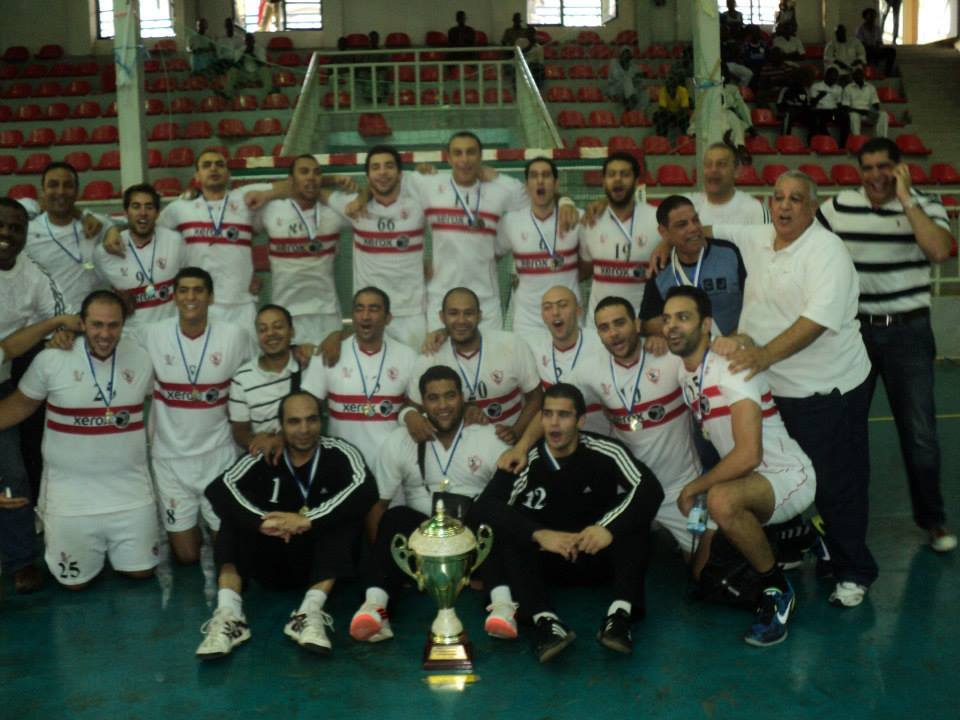
Al Zamalek Cairo is 2011 champion.

2011 African Handball Champions Cup Winner

Al Zamalek Cairo
8th title

== See also ==
- 2014 African Handball Championship
