= 2016 African Handball Cup Winners' Cup =

Tournament details
- Host country: Morocco
- Venue(s): 1 (in 1 host city)
- Dates: May 5–20, 2016
- Teams: 11 (from 1 confederation)

Final positions
- Champions: (Egypt) Zamalek (5th title)
- Runner-up: (Tunisia) Espérance
- Third place: (Tunisia) AS Hammamet
- Fourth place: (Egypt) Heliopolis

The 2016 African Handball Cup Winners' Cup was the 22nd edition, organized by the African Handball Confederation, under the auspices of the International Handball Federation, the handball sport governing body. The tournament was held from May 5–27, 2016 and took place at the Salle Al Jadida, in Laayoune, Morocco, contested by 11 teams and won by Zamalek Sporting Club of Egypt.

== Draw ==
Group A	Group B
(Republic of the Congo) Caïman (Tunisia) ES Tunis (Cameroon) FAP Yaoundé (Egypt) Heliopolis; Phoenix Gabon	(Tunisia) AS Hammamet (Cameroon) Eclair D'Eseka (Democratic Republic of the Congo) JS Kinshasa (Gabon) Stade Mandji (Morocco) Widad Smara (Egypt) Zamalek

== Preliminary rounds ==
Times given below are in WET UTC+0.

=== Group A ===
Thu, 05 May 2016
10:00	Heliopolis (Egypt)	31 (16:16) 27	(Republic of the Congo) Caïman
14:00	Espérance (Tunisia)	35 (21:10) 26	Phoenix Gabon
Fri, 06 May 2016
15:00	Phoenix Gabon	23 (11:09) 31	(Egypt) Heliopolis
17:00	Caïman (Republic of the Congo)	23 (11:11) 24	(Cameroon) FAP Yaoundé
Sat, 07 May 2016
15:00	Heliopolis (Egypt)	25 (14:11) 22	(Cameroon) FAP Yaoundé
17:00	Espérance (Tunisia)	37 (16:11) 25	(Republic of the Congo) Caïman
Mon, 09 May 2016
15:00	Caïman (Republic of the Congo)	29 (10:12) 23	Phoenix Gabon
19:00	FAP Yaoundé (Cameroon)	25 (10:15) 32	(Tunisia) Espérance
Tue, 10 May 2016
17:00	FAP Yaoundé (Cameroon)	30 (16:10) 25	Phoenix Gabon
19:00	Espérance (Tunisia)	34 (18:12) 29	(Egypt) Heliopolis

Team	Pld	W	D	L	GF	GA	GDIF	Pts
(Tunisia) Espérance	4	4	0	0	138	105	+33	8
(Egypt) Heliopolis	4	3	0	1	116	106	+10	6
(Cameroon) FAP Yaoundé	4	2	0	2	101	113	-12	4
(Republic of the Congo) Caïman	4	1	0	3	104	115	-11	2
Phoenix Gabon	4	0	0	4	97	125	-28	0

* Note: Advance to quarter-finals
Relegated to 9-12th classification

=== Group B ===
Thu, 05 May 2016
10:00	Stade Mandji (Gabon)	21 (11:18) 35	(Tunisia) AS Hammamet
14:00	JS Kinshasa (Democratic Republic of the Congo)	25 (10:14) 32	(Egypt) Zamalek
18:00	Eclair D'Eseka (Cameroon)	24 (12:14) 31	(Morocco) Widad Smara
Fri, 06 May 2016
19:00	Widad Smara (Morocco)	41 (20:08) 18	(Democratic Republic of the Congo) JS Kinshasa
19:00	Zamalek (Egypt)	26 (14:08) 19	(Gabon) Stade Mandji
19:00	AS Hammamet (Tunisia)	45 (23:10) 28	(Cameroon) Eclair D'Eseka
Sat, 07 May 2016
17:00	Zamalek (Egypt)	42 (21:10) 25	(Cameroon) Eclair D'Eseka
19:00	Widad Smara (Morocco)	22 (12:13) 28	(Tunisia) AS Hammamet
19:00	Stade Mandji (Gabon)	25 (13:15) 25	(Democratic Republic of the Congo) JS Kinshasa
Mon, 09 May 2016
17:00	Zamalek (Egypt)	27 (12:06) 20	(Tunisia) AS Hammamet
17:00	JS Kinshasa (Democratic Republic of the Congo)	35 (16:15) 28	(Cameroon) Eclair D'Eseka
19:00	Widad Smara (Morocco)	27 (14:07) 18	(Gabon) Stade Mandji
Tue, 10 May 2016
15:00	AS Hammamet (Tunisia)	31 (:) 22	(Democratic Republic of the Congo) JS Kinshasa
15:00	Eclair D'Eseka (Cameroon)	22 (11:11) 28	(Gabon) Stade Mandji
19:00	Widad Smara (Morocco)	17 (08:04) 30	(Egypt) Zamalek

Team	Pld	W	D	L	GF	GA	GDIF	Pts
(Egypt) Zamalek	5	5	0	0	157	106	+51	10
(Tunisia) AS Hammamet	5	4	0	1	159	120	+39	8
(Morocco) Widad Smara	5	3	0	2	138	118	+20	6
(Gabon) Stade Mandji	5	1	1	3	111	135	-24	3
(Democratic Republic of the Congo) JS Kinshasa	5	1	1	3	125	157	-32	3
(Cameroon) Eclair D'Eseka	5	0	0	5	127	181	-54	0

* Note: Advance to quarter-finals
Relegated to 9-12th classification

== Knockout stage ==
Championship bracket

Quarter-finals
Wed 11 May 2016 – 16:00
(Tunisia) Espérance	32
(Gabon) Stade Mandji	19
Wed 11 May 2016 – 16:00
(Egypt) Zamalek	35
(Republic of the Congo) Caïman	22
Wed 11 May 2016 – 18:00
(Egypt) Heliopolis	23
(Morocco) Widad Smara	21
Wed 11 May 2016 – 18:00
(Tunisia) AS Hammamet	32
(Cameroon) FAP Yaoundé	20

Semi-finals
Thu 12 May 2016 – 14:30
(Tunisia) AS Hammamet	30
(Tunisia) Espérance	38
Thu 12 May 2016 – 16:30
(Egypt) Heliopolis	31
(Egypt) Zamalek	36

Final
Sat 14 May 2016 – 18:00
(Tunisia) Espérance	25
(Egypt) Zamalek	26
Third place
Fri 13 May 2016 – 19:00
(Tunisia) AS Hammamet	32
(Egypt) Heliopolis	31

5-8th bracket

5–8th place
Thu 12 May 2016 – 16:00
(Cameroon) FAP Yaoundé	29
(Gabon) Stade Mandji	30
Thu 12 May 2016 – 19:00
(Republic of the Congo) Caïman	19
(Morocco) Widad Smara	30

Fifth place
13 May 2016 – 16:30
(Gabon) Stade Mandji	25
(Morocco) Widad Smara	26
Ninth place
13 May 2016 – 14:30
(Cameroon) FAP Yaoundé	27
(Republic of the Congo) Caïman	34

9-11th classification

Wed, 11 May 2016
14:00	Phoenix Gabon	34 (15:09) 21	(Democratic Republic of the Congo) JS Kinshasa
Thu, 12 May 2016
12:00	JS Kinshasa (Democratic Republic of the Congo)	39 (18:14) 28	(Cameroon) Eclair D'Eseka
Fri, 13 May 2016
14:00	Eclair D'Eseka (Cameroon)	27 (18:14) 30	Phoenix Gabon

Team	Pld	W	D	L	GF	GA	GDIF	Pts
Phoenix Gabon	2	2	0	0	64	48	+16	4
(Democratic Republic of the Congo) JS Kinshasa	2	1	0	1	60	62	-2	2
(Cameroon) Eclair D'Eseka	2	0	0	2	55	69	-14	0

== Final standings ==
Rank	Team	Record
Gold medal	(Egypt) Zamalek	8–0
Silver medal	(Tunisia) Espérance	6–1
Bronze medal	(Tunisia) AS Hammamet	6–2
4	(Egypt) Heliopolis	4–3
5	(Morocco) Widad Smara	5–3
6	(Gabon) Stade Mandji	2–5
7	(Republic of the Congo) Caïman	2–5
8	(Cameroon) FAP Yaoundé	2–5
9	Phoenix Gabon	2–4
10	(Democratic Republic of the Congo) JS Kinshasa	2–4
11	(Republic of the Congo) Eclair D'Eseka	0–7

== Awards ==
2016 African Handball Cup Winners' Cup Winner

Zamalek Sporting Club
5th title

Best Player

== See also ==
2016 African Handball Champions League
