= 2010 African Handball Cup Winners' Cup =

Tournament details
- Host country: Burkina Faso
- Venue: 1 (in 1 host city)
- Dates: 7–17 April 2010
- Teams: 16 (from 1 confederation)

Final positions
- Champions: (Egypt) Zamalek (3rd title)
- Runners-up: (Angola) Interclube
- Third place: (Cameroon) Minuh Yaoundé
- Fourth place: (Algeria) JSE Skikda

The 2010 African Handball Cup Winners' Cup was the 26th edition, organized by the African Handball Confederation, under the auspices of the International Handball Federation, the handball sport governing body. The tournament was held from April 7–17, 2010 at the Palais des Sports de Ouagadougou in Ouagadougou, Burkina Faso, contested by 16 teams and won by Zamalek Sporting Club of Egypt.

== Draw ==
Group A	Group B	Group C	Group D
(Benin) ASPAC (Togo) Curiaces (Republic of the Congo) Munisport (Egypt) Zamalek	(Egypt) Al Ahly (Libya) Amin Elam (Democratic Republic of the Congo) Blessing (Cameroon) Minuh Yaoundé	(Burkina Faso) AS Sonabel (Angola) Interclube (Ivory Coast) Red Star (Senegal) US Gorée	(Libya) Al-Nasr (Algeria) JSE Skikda (Benin) RC Flowers (Burkina Faso) USFA

== Preliminary rounds ==
Times given below are in GMT UTC+0.

=== Group A ===
Fri, 09 Apr 2010
Zamalek (Egypt)	36 : 29	(Republic of the Congo) Munisport
ASPAC (Benin)	44 : 32	(Togo) Curiaces
Sat, 10 Apr 2010
Curiaces (Togo)	24 : 34	(Egypt) Zamalek
Munisport (Republic of the Congo)	29 : 29	(Benin) ASPAC
Sun, 11 Apr 2010
Curiaces (Togo)	29 : 46	(Republic of the Congo) Munisport
Zamalek (Egypt)	36 : 27	(Benin) ASPAC

Team	Pld	W	D	L	GF	GA	GDIF	Pts
(Egypt) Zamalek	3	3	0	0	106	80	+26	6
(Republic of the Congo) Munisport	3	1	1	1	104	94	+10	3
(Benin) ASPAC	3	1	1	1	100	97	+3	3
(Togo) Curiaces	3	0	0	3	85	124	-39	0

* Note: Advance to quarter-finals
Relegated to 9-16th classification

=== Group B ===
Thu, 08 Apr 2010
Al Ahly (Egypt)	28 : 24	(Libya) Amin Elam
Blessing (Democratic Republic of the Congo)	22 : 30	(Cameroon) Minuh Yaoundé
Fri, 09 Apr 2010
Amin Elam (Libya)	27 : 21	(Democratic Republic of the Congo) Blessing
Minuh Yaoundé (Cameroon)	20 : 19	(Egypt) Al Ahly
Sat, 10 Apr 2010
Al Ahly (Egypt)	33 : 22	(Democratic Republic of the Congo) Blessing
Minuh Yaoundé (Cameroon)	27 : 18	(Libya) Amin Elam

Team	Pld	W	D	L	GF	GA	GDIF	Pts
(Cameroon) Minuh Yaoundé	3	3	0	0	77	59	+18	6
(Egypt) Al Ahly	3	2	0	1	80	66	+14	4
(Libya) Amin Elam	3	1	0	2	69	76	-7	2
(Democratic Republic of the Congo) Blessing	3	0	0	3	65	90	-25	6

* Note: Advance to quarter-finals
Relegated to 9-16th classification

=== Group C ===
Thu, 08 Apr 2010
Red Star (Ivory Coast)	0 : 10	(Angola) Interclube
AS Sonabel (Burkina Faso)	10 : 0	(Senegal) US Gorée
Fri, 09 Apr 2010
AS Sonabel (Burkina Faso)	22 : 36	(Ivory Coast) Red Star
Interclube (Angola)	32 : 25	(Senegal) US Gorée
Sat, 10 Apr 2010
US Gorée (Senegal)	29 : 41	(Ivory Coast) Red Star
AS Sonabel (Burkina Faso)	13 : 42	(Angola) Interclube

Team	Pld	W	D	L	GF	GA	GDIF	Pts
(Angola) Interclube	3	3	0	0	84	38	+46	6
(Ivory Coast) Red Star	3	2	0	1	77	61	+16	4
(Burkina Faso) AS Sonabel	3	1	0	2	45	78	-33	2
(Senegal) US Gorée	3	0	0	3	54	83	-29	6

* Note: Advance to quarter-finals
Relegated to 9-16th classification

=== Group D ===
Wed, 07 Apr 2010
Al-Nasr (Libya)	21 : 31	(Algeria) JSE Skikda
RC Flowers (Benin)	33 : 24	(Burkina Faso) USFA
Sat, 10 Apr 2010
JSE Skikda (Algeria)	43 : 13	(Burkina Faso) USFA
RC Flowers (Benin)	29 : 35	(Libya) Al-Nasr
Sun, 11 Apr 2010
USFA (Burkina Faso)	28 : 37	(Libya) Al-Nasr
JSE Skikda (Algeria)	29 : 25	(Benin) RC Flowers

Team	Pld	W	D	L	GF	GA	GDIF	Pts
(Algeria) JSE Skikda	3	3	0	0	103	59	+44	6
(Libya) Al-Nasr	3	2	0	1	93	88	+5	4
(Benin) RC Flowers	3	1	0	2	87	88	-5	2
(Burkina Faso) USFA	3	0	0	3	65	113	-48	6

* Note: Advance to quarter-finals
Relegated to 9-16th classification

=== Quarter-finals - Group 1 ===
Mon, 12 Apr 2010
Munisport (Republic of the Congo)	24 : 26	(Cameroon) Minuh Yaoundé
Zamalek	32 : 28	(Egypt) Al Ahly
Tue, 13 Apr 2010
Al Ahly (Egypt)	24 : 34	(Republic of the Congo) Munisport
Minuh Yaoundé (Cameroon)	25 : 38	(Egypt) Zamalek

Team	Pld	W	D	L	GF	GA	GDIF	Pts
(Egypt) Zamalek	2	2	0	0	70	53	+17	6
(Cameroon) Minuh Yaoundé	2	1	0	1	51	62	+11	4
(Republic of the Congo) Munisport	2	1	0	1	58	50	+8	2
(Egypt) Al Ahly	2	0	0	2	52	66	-14	0

* Note: Advance to semi-finals
Relegated to 5-8th classification

=== Quarter-finals - Group 2 ===
Mon, 12 Apr 2010
Al-Nasr (Libya)	27 : 38	(Angola) Interclube
JSE Skikda (Algeria)	27 : 26	(Ivory Coast) Red Star
Tue, 13 Apr 2010
Red Star (Ivory Coast)	33 : 34	(Libya) Al-Nasr
Interclube (Angola)	31 : 26	(Algeria) JSE Skikda

Team	Pld	W	D	L	GF	GA	GDIF	Pts
(Angola) Interclube	2	2	0	0	69	53	+16	6
(Algeria) JSE Skikda	2	1	0	1	53	57	-4	4
(Libya) Al-Nasr	2	1	0	1	61	71	-10	2
(Ivory Coast) Red Star	2	0	0	2	59	61	-2	0

* Note: Advance to semi-finals
Relegated to 5-8th classification

== Knockout stage ==
5-8th bracket

5–8th classification
(Egypt) Al Ahly
(Ivory Coast) Red Star
(Libya) Al-Nasr
(Republic of the Congo) Munisport

Fifth place
Fri 16 Apr 2010
(Egypt) Al Ahly	30
(Libya) Al-Nasr	25
Seventh place
Fri 16 Apr 2010
(Ivory Coast) Red Star	37
(Republic of the Congo) Munisport	30

Championship bracket

Semifinals
Thu 15 Apr 2010
(Egypt) Zamalek	32
(Algeria) JSE Skikda	26
Thu 15 Apr 2010
(Angola) Interclube	27
(Cameroon) Minuh Yaoundé	21

Final
Sat 17 Apr 2010
(Egypt) Zamalek	28
(Angola) Interclube	26
Seventh place
Sat 17 Apr 2010
(Cameroon) Minuh Yaoundé	31
(Algeria) JSE Skikda	28

=== 9–16th qualification - Group 1 ===
Mon/Tue, 12/13 Apr 2010
USFA (Burkina Faso)	19 : 21	(Burkina Faso) AS Sonabel
RC Flowers (Benin)	27 : 38	(Senegal) US Gorée
Wed, 14 Apr 2010
US Gorée (Senegal)	31 : 28	(Burkina Faso) USFA
AS Sonabel (Burkina Faso)	30 : 39	(Benin) RC Flowers

Team	Pld	W	D	L	GF	GA	GDIF	Pts
(Senegal) US Gorée	2	2	0	0	69	55	+14	4
(Benin) RC Flowers	2	1	0	1	66	68	-2	2
(Burkina Faso) AS Sonabel	2	1	0	1	51	58	-7	2
(Burkina Faso) USFA	2	0	0	2	47	52	-5	0

* Note: Advance to 9-12th classification
Relegated to 13-16th classification

=== 9–16th qualification - Group 2 ===
Mon, 12 Apr 2010
Blessing (Democratic Republic of the Congo)	35 : 26	(Benin) ASPAC
Curiaces (Togo)	25 : 27	(Libya) Amin Elam
Tue, 13 Apr 2010
Blessing (Democratic Republic of the Congo)	40 : 34	(Togo) Curiaces
Amin Elam (Libya)	34 : 33	(Benin) ASPAC

Team	Pld	W	D	L	GF	GA	GDIF	Pts
(Democratic Republic of the Congo) Blessing	2	2	0	1	75	60	+15	4
(Libya) Amin Elam	2	2	0	0	61	58	+3	4
(Togo) Curiaces	2	0	0	2	59	67	-8	0
(Benin) ASPAC	2	0	0	2	59	69	-10	0

* Note: Advance to 9-12th classification
Relegated to 13-16th classification

9-12th bracket

9–12th classification
(Libya) Amin Elam
(Senegal) US Gorée
(Benin) RC Flowers
(Democratic Republic of the Congo) Blessing

Ninth place
Fri 16 Apr 2010
(Libya) Amin Elam	29
(Benin) RC Flowers	26
Eleventh place
Thu 15 Apr 2010
(Democratic Republic of the Congo) Blessing	29
(Senegal) US Gorée	26

13-16th bracket

13–16th classification
(Benin) ASPAC
(Burkina Faso) USFA
(Burkina Faso) AS Sonabel
(Togo) Curiaces

Thirteenth place
Thu 15 Apr 2010
(Benin) ASPAC	42
(Burkina Faso) AS Sonabel	30
Fifteenth place
Thu 15 Apr 2010
(Burkina Faso) USFA	34
(Togo) Curiaces	30

== Final standings ==
Rank	Team	Record
Gold medal	(Egypt) Zamalek	–
Silver medal	(Angola) Interclube	–
Bronze medal	(Cameroon) Minuh Yaoundé	–
4	(Algeria) JSE Skikda	–
5	(Egypt) Al Ahly	–
6	(Libya) Al-Nasr	–
7	(Ivory Coast) Red Star	–
8	(Republic of the Congo) Munisport	–
9	(Libya) Amin Elam	–
10	(Benin) RC Flowers	–
11	(Democratic Republic of the Congo) Blessing	–
12	(Senegal) US Gorée	–
13	(Benin) ASPAC	–
14	(Burkina Faso) AS Sonabel	–
15	(Burkina Faso) USFA	–
16	(Togo) Curiaces	–

== Awards ==
2010 African Handball Cup Winner's Cup Winner

Zamalek Sporting Club
3rd title

Most Valuable Player
