= 2011 African Handball Cup Winners' Cup =

Tournament details
- Host country: Cameroon
- Venues: 3 (in 1 host city)
- Dates: 14–22 April 2011
- Teams: 8 (from 1 confederation)

Final positions
- Champions: (Egypt) Zamalek (4th title)
- Runners-up: (Cameroon) FAP Yaoundé
- Third place: (Republic of the Congo) Munisport
- Fourth place: (Morocco) Wydad Smara

The 2011 African Handball Cup Winners' Cup was the 27th edition, organized by the African Handball Confederation, under the auspices of the International Handball Federation, the handball sport governing body. The tournament was held from April 14–22, 2011 at the Palais Polyvalent des Sports de Warda in Yaoundé, Cameroon, contested by 8 teams and won by Zamalek Sporting Club of Egypt.

== Draw ==
Group A	Group B
(Cameroon) Minuh Yaoundé (Republic of the Congo) Munisport (Gabon) Stade Mandji (Morocco) Wydad Smara	(Benin) ASPAC (Cameroon) FAP Yaoundé (Democratic Republic of the Congo) JS Kinshasa (Egypt) Zamalek

== Preliminary rounds ==
Times given below are in WAT UTC+1.

=== Group A ===
Fri, 15 Apr 2011
Minuh Yaoundé (Cameroon)	20 : 22	(Morocco) Wydad Smara
Munisport (Republic of the Congo)	36 : 19	(Gabon) Stade Mandji
Sat, 16 Apr 2011
Stade Mandji (Gabon)	19 : 30	(Cameroon) Minuh Yaoundé
Wydad Smara (Morocco)	32 : 34	(Republic of the Congo) Munisport
Mon, 18 Apr 2011
Wydad Smara (Morocco)	31 : 25	(Gabon) Stade Mandji
Munisport (Republic of the Congo)	23 : 22	(Cameroon) Minuh Yaoundé

Team	Pld	W	D	L	GF	GA	DIF	Pts
(Republic of the Congo) Munisport	3	3	0	0	93	73	+20	6
(Morocco) Wydad Smara	3	2	0	1	85	79	+6	4
(Cameroon) Minuh Yaoundé	3	1	0	2	72	64	+8	2
(Gabon) Stade Mandji	3	0	0	3	63	97	-34	0

* Note: Advance to semi-finals
Relegated to 5th place classification
Relegated to 7th place classification

=== Group B ===
Fri, 15 Apr 2011
Zamalek (Egypt)	31 : 23	(Democratic Republic of the Congo) JS Kinshasa
ASPAC (Benin)	30 : 41	(Cameroon) FAP Yaoundé
Sat, 16 Apr 2011
JS Kinshasa (Democratic Republic of the Congo)	24 : 25	(Benin) ASPAC
FAP Yaoundé (Cameroon)	21 : 38	(Egypt) Zamalek
Mon, 18 Apr 2011
Zamalek (Egypt)	35 : 22	(Benin) ASPAC
FAP Yaoundé (Cameroon)	37 : 25	(Democratic Republic of the Congo) JS Kinshasa

Team	Pld	W	D	L	GF	GA	DIF	Pts
(Egypt) Zamalek	3	3	0	0	104	66	+38	6
(Cameroon) FAP Yaoundé	3	2	0	1	99	93	+6	4
(Benin) ASPAC	3	1	0	2	77	100	-23	2
(Democratic Republic of the Congo) JS Kinshasa	3	0	0	3	72	93	-21	0

* Note: Advance to semi-finals
Relegated to 5th place classification
Relegated to 7th place classification

== Knockout stage ==
Championship bracket

Semi-final
Wed 20 Apr 2011 – 17:00
(Egypt) Zamalek	38
(Morocco) Wydad Smara	23
Wed 20 Apr 2011 – 16:00
(Cameroon) FAP Yaoundé	30
(Republic of the Congo) Munisport	22

Final
Fri 22 Apr 2011 – 16:30
(Egypt) Zamalek	27
FAP Yaoundé	21
Third place
Thu 21 Apr 2011 – 15:00
(Republic of the Congo) Munisport	36
(Morocco) Wydad Smara	29

5-8th bracket

Semi-finals

Fifth place
Wed 20 Apr 2011 – 12:30
(Cameroon) Minuh Yaoundé	29
(Benin) ASPAC	26
Seventh place
Wed 20 Apr 2011 – 11:00
(Democratic Republic of the Congo) JS Kinshasa	26
(Gabon) Stade Mandji	19

== Final standings ==
Rank	Team	Record
Gold medal	(Egypt) Zamalek	5–0
Silver medal	(Cameroon) FAP Yaoundé	3–2
Bronze medal	(Republic of the Congo) Munisport	4–1
4	(Morocco) Wydad Smara	2–3
5	(Cameroon) Minuh Yaoundé	2–2
6	(Benin) ASPAC	1–3
7	(Democratic Republic of the Congo) JS Kinshasa	1–3
8	(Gabon) Stade Mandji	0–4

== Awards ==
2011 African Handball Cup Winner's Cup Winner

Zamalek Sporting Club
4th title

Most Valuable Player
