= 2012 African Handball Cup Winners' Cup =

Sports competition

Tournament details
- Host country: Tunisia
- Venues: 3 (in 1 host city)
- Dates: 19–30 April 2012
- Teams: 13 (from 1 confederation)

Final positions
- Champions: (Tunisia) ES Sahel (1st title)
- Runners-up: (Egypt) Zamalek
- Third place: (Tunisia) Club Africain
- Fourth place: (Morocco) RS Berkane

The 2012 African Handball Cup Winners' Cup was the 28th edition, organized by the African Handball Confederation, under the auspices of the International Handball Federation, the handball sport governing body. The tournament was held from April 19–30, 2012 at the Salle El-Menzah in Tunis, Tunisia, contested by 13 teams and won by Étoile Sportive du Sahel of Tunisia.

== Draw ==
Group A	Group B	Group C
(Libya) Al-Jazeera (Tunisia) ES Sahel (Cameroon) FAP Yaoundé (Democratic Republic of the Congo) JS Kinshasa	(Tunisia) Club Africain (Ivory Coast) Red Star (Guinea) Union Sportive (Morocco) Wydad Smara	(Libya) Al-Hilal (Nigeria) Kano Pyramid (Morocco) RS Berkane (Madagascar) Saint-Michel (Egypt) Zamalek

== Preliminary rounds ==
Times given below are in CET UTC+1.

=== Group A ===
Sat, 21 Apr 2012
FAP Yaoundé (Cameroon)	23 : 23	(Democratic Republic of the Congo) JS Kinshasa
ES Sahel (Tunisia)	28 : 14	(Libya) Al-Jazeera
Mon, 23 Apr 2012
Al-Jazeera (Libya)	28 : 19	(Cameroon) FAP Yaoundé
JS Kinshasa (Democratic Republic of the Congo)	18 : 32	(Tunisia) ES Sahel
Wed, 25 Apr 2012
JS Kinshasa (Democratic Republic of the Congo)	21 : 31	(Libya) Al-Jazeera
FAP Yaoundé (Cameroon)	20 : 27	(Tunisia) ES Sahel

Team	Pld	W	D	L	GF	GA	GDIF	Pts
(Tunisia) ES Sahel	3	3	0	0	87	52	+35	6
(Libya) Al-Jazeera	3	2	0	1	73	68	+5	4
(Cameroon) FAP Yaoundé	3	0	1	2	62	78	-16	1
(Democratic Republic of the Congo) JS Kinshasa	3	0	1	2	62	86	-24	1

* Note: Advance to quarter-finals
Relegated to 9-12th classification

=== Group B ===
Fri, 20 Apr 2012
Wydad Smara (Morocco)	10 : 0	(Guinea) US Guinée
Red Star (Ivory Coast)	22 : 31	(Tunisia) Club Africain
Sun, 22 Apr 2012
US Guinée (Guinea)	17 : 33	(Ivory Coast) Red Star
Club Africain (Tunisia)	32 : 20	(Morocco) Wydad Smara
Tue, 24 Apr 2012
Wydad Smara (Morocco)	21 : 24	(Ivory Coast) Red Star
Club Africain (Tunisia)	50 : 27	(Guinea) US Guinée

Team	Pld	W	D	L	GF	GA	GDIF	Pts
(Tunisia) Club Africain	3	3	0	0	113	69	+44	6
(Ivory Coast) Red Star	3	2	0	1	79	69	+10	4
(Morocco) Wydad Smara	3	1	0	2	41	56	-15	2
(Guinea) US Guinée **	3	0	0	3	44	83	-39	0

* Note: Advance to quarter-finals
Relegated to 9-12th classification
** Penalty for failing to pay participation fees

=== Group C ===
Fri, 20 Apr 2012
Saint-Michel (Madagascar)	27 : 30	(Nigeria) Kano Pyramid
Al-Hilal (Libya)	21 : 26	(Egypt) Zamalek
Sat, 21 Apr 2012
Zamalek (Egypt)	41 : 20	(Madagascar) Saint-Michel
RS Berkane (Morocco)	32 : 22	(Libya) Al-Hilal
Sun, 22 Apr 2012
Kano Pyramid (Nigeria)	23 : 26	(Morocco) RS Berkane
Mon, 23 Apr 2012
Saint-Michel (Madagascar)	23 : 30	(Libya) Al-Hilal
Kano Pyramid (Nigeria)	18 : 33	(Egypt) Zamalek
Tue, 24 Apr 2012
RS Berkane (Morocco)	38 : 24	(Madagascar) Saint-Michel
Wed, 25 Apr 2012
Al-Hilal (Libya)	35 : 28	(Nigeria) Kano Pyramid
Zamalek (Egypt)	24 : 20	(Morocco) RS Berkane

Team	Pld	W	D	L	GF	GA	GDIF	Pts
(Egypt) Zamalek	4	4	0	0	124	79	+45	8
(Morocco) RS Berkane	4	3	0	1	116	93	+23	6
(Libya) Al-Hilal	4	2	0	2	108	109	-1	4
(Nigeria) Kano Pyramid	4	1	0	3	99	121	-22	2
(Madagascar) Saint-Michel	4	0	0	4	94	139	-45	0

* Note: Advance to quarter-finals
Relegated to 9-12th classification

== Knockout stage ==
Championship bracket

Quarter-finals
Fri 27 Apr 2012
(Ivory Coast) Red Star	35
(Morocco) RS Berkane	36
Fri 27 Apr 2012
(Libya) Al-Jazeera	22
(Egypt) Zamalek	30
Fri 27 Apr 2012
(Tunisia) ES Sahel	28
(Morocco) Wydad Smara	17
Fri 27 Apr 2012
(Tunisia) Club Africain	38
(Libya) Al-Hilal	25

Semi-finals
Sat 28 Apr 2012
(Tunisia) ES Sahel	34
(Morocco) RS Berkane	21
Sat 28 Apr 2012
(Tunisia) Club Africain	22
(Egypt) Zamalek	23

Final
Sun 29 Apr 2012
(Tunisia) ES Sahel	23
(Egypt) Zamalek	18
Third place
Sun 29 Apr 2012
(Morocco) RS Berkane	23
(Tunisia) Club Africain	33

5-8th bracket

5th-8th place
Thu 25 Apr 2013
(Libya) Al-Jazeera
Thu 25 Apr 2013
(Morocco) Wydad Smara

Fifth place
Fri 26 Apr 2013
(Morocco) Wydad Smara	24
(Libya) Al-Jazeera	31
Seventh place
Fri 26 Apr 2013
(Libya) Al-Hilal	24
(Ivory Coast) Red Star	25

9-12th bracket

9th-12th place
Thu 25 Apr 2013
(Nigeria) Kano Pyramid
Thu 25 Apr 2013
(Cameroon) FAP Yaoundé

Ninth place
Fri 26 Apr 2013
(Nigeria) Kano Pyramid
(Cameroon) FAP Yaoundé
Eleventh place
Fri 26 Apr 2013
(Democratic Republic of the Congo) JS Kinshasa
(Guinea) US Guinée

== Final standings ==
Rank	Team	Record
Gold medal	(Tunisia) ES Sahel	6–0
Silver medal	(Egypt) Zamalek	6–1
Bronze medal	(Tunisia) Club Africain	5–1
4	(Morocco) RS Berkane	4–3
5	(Libya) Al-Jazeera	3–2
6	(Morocco) Wydad Smara	1–4
7	(Ivory Coast) Red Star	3–2
8	(Libya) Al-Hilal	2–4
9	(Nigeria) Kano Pyramid	1–3
10	(Cameroon) FAP Yaoundé	0–2
11	(Democratic Republic of the Congo) JS Kinshasa	0–2
12	(Guinea) US Guinée	0–3
13	(Madagascar) Saint-Michel	0–4

== Awards ==
2012 African Handball Cup Winner's Cup Winner

Étoile Sportive du Sahel
1st title

Most Valuable Player
