= African Men's Handball Cup Winners' Cup =

International handball competition

- Founded: 1985
- Country: Africa
- Confederation: CAHB members
- Most recent champion: (Republic of the Congo) Étoile du Congo (1nd title)
- Most titles: (Algeria) MC Alger (9 titles)
- 2026 African Handball Cup Winners' Cup

African Men's Handball Championship for Clubs Winner's Cup is an annual international club handball competition run by the African Handball Confederation. The cup winners from Africa's national handball leagues are invited to participate in this competition.

== Summary ==
#	Year	Host	Final			Third place match		
#	Year	Host	Champion	Score	Second place	Third place	Score	Fourth place
1	1985; Details	(Egypt); Cairo	(Egypt); Zamalek	Round-robin	(Egypt); Al Ahly	(Nigeria); Niger United		
2	1986; Details	(Benin); Cotonou	(Nigeria); Niger United	–	(Egypt); Port Said SC	(Egypt); Zamalek	21–19	(Algeria); Nadit Alger
3	1987; Details	(Egypt); Cairo	(Algeria); MP Oran	Round-robin	(Egypt); Zamalek	(Egypt); Port Said SC	Round-robin	(Nigeria); Niger United
4	1988; Details	(Algeria); Oran	(Algeria); MC Alger	Round-robin	(Algeria); MC Oran	(Tunisia); Club Africain	Round-robin	(Ivory Coast); SO Armée
5	1989; Details	(Egypt); Cairo	(Algeria); JSB ERCA Alger	19–18	(Algeria); MC Alger	(Tunisia); Club Africain	25–21	(Egypt); Al Ahly
6	1990; Details	(Morocco); Rabat	(Algeria); JSB ERCA Alger	21–20	(Algeria); MC Alger	(Egypt); Zamalek	25–22	(Morocco); COD Meknès
7	1991; Details	(Algeria); Algiers	(Algeria); MC Alger	Round-robin	(Algeria); JSB ERCA Alger	(Egypt); Port Said SC	Round-robin	(Tunisia); EM Mahdia
8	1992; Details	(Nigeria); Bauchi	(Algeria); MC Alger	–	(Cameroon); FAP Yaoundé	(Nigeria); Benue Buffaloes	–	(Benin); Pelican Cotonou
9	1993; Details	(Egypt); Cairo	(Algeria); MC Alger	20–17	(Egypt); Port Said SC	(Egypt); Zamalek	21–16	(Algeria); JSB ERCA Alger
10	1994; Details	(Morocco); Rabat	(Algeria); MC Alger	Round-robin	(Algeria); JSB ERCA Alger	(Tunisia); EM Mahdia	Round-robin	(Morocco); COS MUV
11	1995; Details	(Niger); Niamey	(Algeria); MC Alger	Round-robin	(Cameroon); FAP Yaoundé	(Angola); Primeiro de Agosto	Round-robin	(Niger); AS SONIDEP
12	1996; Details	(Morocco); Meknes	(Morocco); KAC Marrakech	24–19	(Algeria); MC Alger	(Morocco); COD Meknès	–	(Angola); GD da Banca
13	1997; Details	(Nigeria); Kano	(Algeria); MC Alger	25–15	(Nigeria); Abuja Unity Boys	(Nigeria); Kano Pyramid	–	(Cameroon); FAP Yaoundé
14	1998; Details	(Nigeria); Bauchi	(Algeria); MC Alger	26–20	(Cameroon); FAP Yaoundé	(Republic of the Congo); Étoile du Congo	–	(Nigeria); Customs Kings
15	1999; Details	(Algeria); Algiers	(Algeria); MC Alger	25–23	(Algeria); OC Alger	(Morocco); KBM Handball	31–22	(Cameroon); Minuh Yaoundé
16	2000; Details	(Nigeria); Bauchi	(Cameroon); FAP Yaoundé	–	(Nigeria); Yankari Bulls	(Cameroon); Minuh Yaoundé	–	(Ivory Coast); SO Armée
17	2001; Details	(Morocco); Meknes	(Tunisia); Club Africain	–	(Egypt); Al Ahly	(Algeria); OC Alger	–	(Morocco); COD Meknes
18	2002; Details	(Ivory Coast); Yamoussoukro	(Cameroon); Minuh Yaoundé	Round-robin	(Benin); Pelican Cotonou	(Ivory Coast); SO Armée	Round-robin	(Ivory Coast); Red Star Oja
19	2003; Details	(Tunisia); Tunis	(Tunisia); ES Tunis	–	(Tunisia); AS Hammamet	(Algeria); SR Annaba	–	(Cameroon); Minuh Yaoundé
20	2004; Details	(Tunisia); Tunis	(Tunisia); Club Africain	27–21	(Tunisia); ES Tunis	(Cameroon); Minuh Yaoundé	–	(Democratic Republic of the Congo); HC BCC Kinshasa
21	2005; Details	(Morocco); Fes	(Tunisia); Club Africain	–	(Morocco); MAS Fez	(Ivory Coast); Red Star Oja	–	(Republic of the Congo); Diables Noires
22	2006; Details	(Ivory Coast); Abidjan	(Cameroon); Minuh Yaoundé	–	(Ivory Coast); Red Star Oja	(Ivory Coast); SO Armée	–	(Republic of the Congo); Patronage Sainte-Anne
23	2007; Details	(Tunisia); Mahdia	(Tunisia); Club Africain	–	(Tunisia); EM Mahdia	(Egypt); Zamalek	41–39 (ET)	(Cameroon); Minuh Yaoundé
24	2008; Details	(Morocco); Meknes	(Tunisia); Club Africain	33–31 (ET)	(Algeria); MC Saïda	(Algeria); JSE Skikda	39–32	(Morocco); COD Meknès
25	2009; Details	(Benin); Cotonou	(Egypt); Zamalek	31–28	(Cameroon); Minuh Yaoundé	(Republic of the Congo); Inter Club Brazzaville	–	(Ivory Coast); Red Star Oja
26	2010; Details	(Burkina Faso); Ouagadougou	(Egypt); Zamalek	28–26	(Angola); GD Interclube	(Cameroon); Minuh Yaoundé	31–28	(Algeria); JSE Skikda
27	2011; Details	(Cameroon); Yaoundé	(Egypt); Zamalek	27–21	(Cameroon); FAP Yaoundé	(Republic of the Congo); Munisport Pointe-Noire	36–29	(Morocco); Wydad Smara
28	2012; Details	(Tunisia); Tunis	(Tunisia); ES Sahel	23–18	(Egypt); Zamalek	(Tunisia); Club Africain	33–23	(Morocco); RS Berkane
29	2013; Details	(Tunisia); Hammamet	(Egypt); Al Ahly	31–18	(Tunisia); AS Hammamet	(Tunisia); ES Sahel	33–24	(Nigeria); Niger United
30	2014; Details	(Republic of the Congo); Oyo	(Tunisia); ES Tunis	26–24	(Egypt); Al Ahly	(Gabon); Salinas HC	Round-robin	(Republic of the Congo); Patronage Sainte-Anne
31	2015; Details	(Gabon); Libreville	(Tunisia); ES Tunis	27–26	(Egypt); Al Ahly	(Tunisia); Club Africain	33–25	(Gabon); Stade Mandji
32	2016; Details	(Morocco); Laayoune	(Egypt); Zamalek	26–25	(Tunisia); ES Tunis	(Tunisia); AS Hammamet	32–31	(Egypt); Heliopolis SC
33	2017; Details	(Morocco); Agadir	(Egypt); Al Ahly	31–22	(Tunisia); AS Hammamet	(Morocco); Wydad Smara	26–20	(Morocco); Raja d'Agadir
34	2018; Details	(Egypt); Cairo	(Egypt); Al Ahly	25–12	(Libya); Al-Ittihad Tripoli	(Morocco); Wydad Smara	24–23	(Democratic Republic of the Congo); JS Kinshasa
35	2019; Details	(Morocco); Oujda	(Tunisia); ES Sahel	28–24	(Egypt); Al Ahly	(Tunisia); ES Tunis	36–26	(Morocco); MC Oujda
-	2020		Cancelled due to the COVID-19 pandemic					
36	2021; Details	(Morocco); Meknes	(Egypt); Al Ahly	29–24	(Morocco); Wydad Smara	(Angola); GD Interclube	29–28	(Democratic Republic of the Congo); JS Kinshasa
37	2022; Details	(Niger); Niamey	(Egypt); Zamalek	29–28	(Egypt); Al Ahly	(Cameroon); FAP Yaoundé	29–28	(Democratic Republic of the Congo); SC Don Bosco
38	2023; Details	(Egypt); Cairo	(Egypt); Zamalek	26–25	(Egypt); Al Ahly	(Egypt); Alexandria SC	34–17	(Morocco); Raja Agadir
39	2024; Details	(Algeria); Oran	(Tunisia); ES Tunis	30–25	(Egypt); Zamalek	(Egypt); Al Ahly	37–28	(Algeria); JSE Skikda
40	2025; Details	(Egypt); Cairo	(Egypt); Al Ahly	31–28	(Egypt); Zamalek	(Tunisia); ES Tunis	43–25	(Morocco); Montada Derb Sultan
41	2026; Details	(Democratic Republic of the Congo); Kinshasa	(Republic of the Congo); Étoile du Congo	19–16	(Cameroon); FAP Yaoundé	(Democratic Republic of the Congo); JS Kinshasa	32–26	(Morocco); Montada Derb Sultan

^n/a A round-robin tournament determined the final standings.

== Winners by club ==
#	Club	Winners	Runners up	Third	Total
1	(Algeria) MC Alger	9	3	0	12
2	(Egypt) Zamalek	7	3	4	14
3	(Egypt) Al Ahly	5	7	1	13
4	(Tunisia) Club Africain	5	0	3	8
5	(Tunisia) ES Tunis	4	2	1	7
6	(Algeria) OC Alger	2	3	1	6
7	(Cameroon) Minuh Yaoundé	2	1	3	6
8	(Tunisia) ES Sahel	2	0	1	3
9	(Cameroon) FAP Yaoundé	1	5	1	7
10	(Algeria) MC Oran	1	1	0	2
11	(Nigeria) Niger United	1	0	1	2
11	(Republic of the Congo) Étoile du Congo	1	0	1	2
13	(Morocco) KAC Marrakech	1	0	0	1

2nd & Third Placed Clubs
#	Club	Winners	Runners up	Third	Total
14	(Tunisia) AS Hammamet	0	3	1	4
15	(Egypt) Port Said SC	0	2	2	4
16	(Morocco) Widad Smara	0	1	2	3
17	(Ivory Coast) Red Star Oja	0	1	1	2
17	(Angola) GD Interclube	0	1	1	2
17	(Tunisia) EM Mahdia	0	1	1	2
20	(Algeria) MC Saïda	0	1	0	1
20	(Benin) Pelican Cotonou	0	1	0	1
20	(Libya) Al-Ittihad Tripoli	0	1	0	1
20	(Morocco) MAS Fez	0	1	0	1
20	(Nigeria) Abuja Unity Boys	0	1	0	1
20	(Nigeria) Yankari Bulls	0	1	0	1
25	(Ivory Coast) SO Armée	0	0	2	2
26	(Algeria) JSE Skikda	0	0	1	1
26	(Algeria) SR Annaba	0	0	1	1
26	(Angola) Primeiro de Agosto	0	0	1	1
26	(Republic of the Congo) Inter Club Brazzaville	0	0	1	1
26	(Republic of the Congo) Munisport Pointe-Noire	0	0	1	1
26	(Democratic Republic of the Congo) JS Kinshasa	0	0	1	1
26	(Egypt) Alexandria SC	0	0	1	1
26	(Gabon) Salinas HC	0	0	1	1
26	(Morocco) COD Meknès	0	0	1	1
26	(Morocco) KBM Handball	0	0	1	1
26	(Nigeria) Benue Buffaloes	0	0	1	1
26	(Nigeria) Kano Pyramid	0	0	1	1
Total		39	39	39	117

- Rq:

GS Pétroliers (ex. MP Alger & MC Alger)
OC Alger (ex. IRB Alger & JSB ERCA Alger)
MC Oran (ex. MP Oran)

== Winners by country ==
#	Nation	Winners	Runners up	Thirds	Total Finals
1	Egypt	12	13	8	33
2	Algeria	12	8	3	23
3	Tunisia	11	6	9	25
4	Cameroon	3	6	3	12
5	Morocco	1	2	4	7
6	Nigeria	1	2	2	5
7	(Republic of the Congo) Congo	1	0	3	4

2nd & Third Placed Nations
#	Nation	Winners	Runners up	Thirds	Total Finals
8	Ivory Coast	0	1	3	4
9	Angola	0	1	1	2
10	Benin	0	1	0	1
11	Democratic Republic of the Congo	0	0	1	1
11	Gabon	0	0	1	1
Total		39	39	39	117

== Medals (1985/2026) ==
Rank	Nation	Gold	Silver	Bronze	Total
1	Egypt	12	13	8	33
2	Algeria	12	8	3	23
3	Tunisia	11	6	9	26
4	Cameroon	3	6	4	13
5	Morocco	1	2	4	7
6	Nigeria	1	2	3	6
7	Congo	1	0	3	4
8	Ivory Coast	0	1	3	4
9	Angola	0	1	2	3
10	Benin	0	1	0	1
10	Libya	0	1	0	1
12	DR Congo	0	0	1	1
12	Gabon	0	0	1	1
Totals (13 entries)		41	41	41	123

== Participation details ==
Nat
Nat	Club		(Nigeria)	(Morocco)	(Ivory Coast)	(Tunisia)	(Tunisia)	(Morocco)	(Ivory Coast)	(Tunisia)	(Morocco)	(Benin)	(Uganda)	(Cameroon)	(Tunisia)	(Tunisia)	(Republic of the Congo)	(Gabon)	(Morocco)	(Morocco)	(Egypt)	(Morocco)
Nat	Club	1985–1999	2000	2001	2002	2003	2004	2005	2006	2007	2008	2009	2010	2011	2012	2013	2014	2015	2016	2017	2018	2019
Nat	Club		X	X	X	X	X	X	X	X	x	x	16	8	13	13	7	12	11	10	14	12
(Nigeria)	Abuja Unity Boys	1997	-	-	-	-	-	-	-	-	-	-	-	-	-	-	-	-	-	-	-	-
(Democratic Republic of the Congo)	AC Scorpion																					
(Egypt)	Al Ahly	1985	-	2 2001	-	-	-	-	-	-	-	-	5	-	-	01 2013	2 2014	02 2015	-	2017	2018	-
(Libya)	Al-Nasr Benghazi																					
(Libya)	Al-Hilal Benghazi																					
(Libya)	Al-Ittihad Tripoli																					
(Egypt)	Alexandria SC																					
(Libya)	Aljazeera SC																					
(Libya)	Amin Elam																					
(Tunisia)	AS Hammamet																					
(Burkina Faso)	AS Sonabel																					
(Benin)	ASPA Cotonou																					
(Democratic Republic of the Congo)	BCC Kinshasa																					
(Nigeria)	Benue Buffaloes	1992	-	-	-	-	-	-	-	-	-	-	-	-	-	-	-	-	-	-	-	-
(Democratic Republic of the Congo)	Blessing du Katanga																					
(Republic of the Congo)	AS Caïman																					
(Tunisia)	Club Africain	1988 1989	-	1 2001	-	-	1 2004	1 2005	-	1 2007	1 2008	-	-	-	03 2012	-	-	03 2015	-	-	-	-
(Morocco)	COD Meknès	1996	-	4	-	-	-	-	-	-	4	-	-	-	-	-	-	-	-	-	-	-
(Togo)	Curiaces de Lomé																					
(Republic of the Congo)	Diables Noires																					
(Cameroon)	Eclair d'Eseka																					
(Tunisia)	EM Mahdia	1994	-	-	-	-	-	-	-	2 2007	-	-	-	-	-	-	-	-	-	-	-	-
(Tunisia)	ES Tunis																					
(Republic of the Congo)	Étoile du Congo	1998	-	-	-	-	-	-	-	-	-	-	-	-	-	-	-	-	-	-	-	-
(Tunisia)	ES Sahel																					
(Cameroon)	FAP Yaoundé	1992 1995 1998	1 2000	-	-	-	-	-	-	-	-	-	-	2 2011	10	8	7	5	8	8	7	-
(Cameroon)	Fanz																					
(Egypt)	Heliopolis SC																					
(Republic of the Congo)	Inter Club Brazzaville																					
(Angola)	GD Interclube																					
(Burundi)	Intwari HC																					
(Democratic Republic of the Congo)	JS Kinshasa																					
(Democratic Republic of the Congo)	JS Lubumbashi																					
(Gabon)	JS Mouila																					
(Algeria)	JSE Skikda																					
(Morocco)	KAC Marrakech	1996	-	-	-	-	-	-	-	-	-	-	-	-	-	-	-	-	-	-	-	-
(Nigeria)	Kano Pillars																					
(Nigeria)	Kano Pyramid	1997	-	-	-	-	-	-	-	-	-	-	-	-	9	-	-	-	-	-	-	-
(Morocco)	KBM Handball	1999	-	-	-	-	-	-	-	-	-	-	-	-	-	-	-	-	-	-	-	-
(Ethiopia)	Kembata Durame																					
(Ethiopia)	Kirkos Subcity																					
(Morocco)	MAS Fez																					
(Algeria)	MC Alger	1988 1989 1990 1991 1992 1993 1994 1995 1996 1997 1998 1999	-	-	-	-	-	-	-	-	-	-	-	-	-	-	-	-	-	-	-	-
(Algeria)	MC Oran	1987 1988	-	-	-	-	-	-	-	-	-	-	-	-	-	-	-	-	-	-	-	-
(Algeria)	MC Saïda																					
(Cameroon)	Minuh Yaoundé																					
(Republic of the Congo)	Munisport Pointe-Noire																					
(Nigeria)	Niger United	1986	-	-	-	-	-	-	-	-	-	-	-	-	-	4	-	-	-	-	-	-
(Algeria)	OC Alger	1989 1990 1991 1994 1999	-	3 2001	-	-	-	-	-	-	-	-	-	-	-	-	-	-	-	-	-	-
(Republic of the Congo)	Patronage Sainte-Anne																					
(Benin)	Pelican Cotonou																					
(Gabon)	Phoenix Gabon																					
(Egypt)	Port Said SC	1986 1987 1991 1993	-	-	-	-	-	-	-	-	-	-	-	-	-	-	-	-	-	-	-	-
(Angola)	Primeiro de Agosto	1995	-	-	-	-	-	-	-	-	-	-	-	-	-	-	-	-	-	-	-	-
(Morocco)	Raja Agadir																					
(Ivory Coast)	Red Star																					
(Benin)	RC Flowers																					
(Tunisia)	RS Berkane																					
(Madagascar)	AS Saint-Michel																					
(Gabon)	Salinas HC																					
(Ivory Coast)	SOA																					
(Algeria)	SR Annaba																					
(Gabon)	Stade Mandji																					
(Senegal)	US Gorée																					
(Guinea)	US Guinée																					
(Burkina Faso)	USFA																					
(Cameroon)	Volcan de Yaoundé																					
(Morocco)	Widad Smara																					
(Nigeria)	Yankari Bulls																					
(Egypt)	Zamalek	1985 1986 1987 1990 1993	-	-	-	-	-	-	-	3 2007	-	1 2009	01 2010	1 2011	02 2012	-	-	-	01 2016	-	-	-
# Teams			x	x	x	x	x	x	x	x	x	x	16	8	13	13	7	12	11	10	14	12

== See also ==
- African Women's Handball Cup Winners' Cup
- African Handball Champions League
- African Women's Handball Champions League
- African Handball Super Cup
- African Women's Handball Super Cup
- African Men's Handball Championship
- African Women's Handball Championship
