= 2015 African Handball Champions League =

Tournament details
- Host country: Morocco
- Venue(s): 3 (in 1 host city)
- Dates: May 15–24
- Teams: 15 (from 1 confederation)

Final positions
- Champions: (Egypt) Zamalek (9th title)
- Runner-up: (Tunisia) Club Africain
- Third place: (Egypt) Alexandria SC
- Fourth place: (Tunisia) Espérance Tunis

Tournament statistics
- Matches played: 40
- Goals scored: 2,122 (53.05 per match)

The 2015 African Handball Champions League was the 37th edition, organized by the African Handball Confederation, under the auspices of the International Handball Federation, the handball sport governing body. The tournament was held from October 21–30, 2015 in three venues: Salle Al Aroui, Salle Omnisport and Salle Sellaouan, in Nador, Morocco, contested by 15 teams and won by Al Zamalek Cairo of Egypt.

Zamalek qualified to the 2016 IHF Super Globe.

== Draw ==
Group A	Group B	Group C	Group D
(Egypt) Al Ahly (Rwanda) Police HBC (Gabon) Stade Mandji (Morocco) Widad Smara	(Tunisia) Club Africain (Cameroon) Fanz (Egypt) Zamalek	(Tunisia) Espérance Tunis (Cameroon) FAP Yaoundé (Republic of the Congo) Inter Club (Nigeria) Niger United	(Egypt) Alexandria SC (Morocco) Hilal de Nador (Democratic Republic of the Congo) JS Kinshasa (Democratic Republic of the Congo) Police HC

== Preliminary rounds ==
Times given below are in WET UTC+0.

=== Group A ===
Wed/Thu, 21/22 Oct 2015
Widad Smara (Morocco)	46 (19:13) 28	(Rwanda) Police HBC
Stade Mandji (Gabon)	22 (12:13) 31	(Egypt) Al Ahly
Sat, 24 Oct 2015
Stade Mandji (Gabon)	28 (19:16) 32	(Morocco) Widad Smara
Police HBC (Rwanda)	18 (07:22) 54	(Egypt) Al Ahly
Sun, 25 Oct 2015
Police HBC (Rwanda)	20 (10:17) 37	(Gabon) Stade Mandji
Al Ahly (Egypt)	26 (14:11) 19	(Morocco) Widad Smara

Team	Pld	W	D	L	GF	GA	GDIF	Pts
(Egypt) Al Ahly	3	3	0	0	111	59	+52	6
(Morocco) Widad Smara	3	2	0	1	97	82	+15	4
(Gabon) Stade Mandji	3	1	0	2	87	83	+4	2
(Rwanda) Police HBC	3	0	0	3	66	137	-71	0

- Note: Advance to quarter-finals
  Relegated to 5-8th classification
  Relegated to 9-12th classification

=== Group B ===
Wed, 21 Oct 2015
Fanz (Cameroon)	20 (08:11) 24	(Egypt) Zamalek
Sat, 24 Oct 2015
Fanz (Cameroon)	21 (10:12) 25	(Tunisia) Club Africain
Sun, 25 Oct 2015
Zamalek (Egypt)	24 (13:14) 28	(Tunisia) Club Africain

Team	Pld	W	D	L	GF	GA	GDIF	Pts
(Tunisia) Club Africain	2	2	0	0	45	21	+24	4
(Egypt) Zamalek	2	1	0	1	44	20	+24	2
(Cameroon) Fanz	2	0	0	2	41	98	-57	0

- Note: Advance to quarter-finals
  Relegated to 5-8th classification
  Relegated to 9-12th classification

=== Group C ===
Thu, 22 Oct 2015
FAP Yaoundé (Cameroon)	30 (13:14) 28	(Republic of the Congo) Inter Club
Espérance Tunis (Tunisia)	20 (:) 0	(Nigeria) Niger United
Fri, 23 Oct 2015
Niger United (Nigeria)	33 (16:16) 36	(Cameroon) FAP Yaoundé
Inter Club (Republic of the Congo)	24 (15:19) 39	(Tunisia) Espérance Tunis
Sun, 25 Oct 2015
Niger United (Nigeria)	36 (21:16) 26	(Republic of the Congo) Inter Club
Espérance Tunis (Tunisia)	40 (19:13) 23	(Cameroon) FAP Yaoundé

Team	Pld	W	D	L	GF	GA	GDIF	Pts
(Tunisia) Espérance Tunis	3	3	0	0	120	74	+46	6
(Cameroon) FAP Yaoundé	3	2	0	1	94	83	+11	4
(Nigeria) Niger United	3	1	0	2	97	92	+5	2
(Republic of the Congo) Inter Club	3	0	0	3	62	124	-62	0

- Note: Advance to quarter-finals
  Relegated to 5-8th classification
  Relegated to 9-12th classification

=== Group D ===
Wed, 21 Oct 2015
Alexandria SC (Egypt)	26 (12:09) 21	(Democratic Republic of the Congo) JS Kinshasa
Hilal de Nador (Morocco)	30 (15:03) 10	(Democratic Republic of the Congo) Police HC
Fri, 23 Oct 2015
Alexandria SC (Egypt)	28 (15:04) 9	(Democratic Republic of the Congo) Police HC
JS Kinshasa (Democratic Republic of the Congo)	22 (11:12) 22	(Morocco) Hilal de Nador
Sun, 25 Oct 2015
Alexandria SC (Egypt)	21 (12:10) 20	(Morocco) Hilal de Nador
Police HC (Democratic Republic of the Congo)	08 (07:25) 38	(Democratic Republic of the Congo) JS Kinshasa

Team	Pld	W	D	L	GF	GA	GDIF	Pts
(Egypt) Alexandria SC	3	3	0	0	75	50	+25	6
(Democratic Republic of the Congo) JS Kinshasa	3	2	0	1	81	56	+25	4
(Morocco) Hilal de Nador	3	1	0	2	72	53	+19	2
(Democratic Republic of the Congo) Police HC	3	0	0	3	27	96	-69	0

- Note: Advance to quarter-finals
  Relegated to 5-8th classification
  Relegated to 9-12th classification

== Knockout stage ==
Championship bracket

Quarter-finals
Tue 27 Oct 2015 – 16:00
(Egypt) Zamalek	26
(Egypt) Al Ahly	24
Tue 27 Oct 2015 – 12:00
(Tunisia) Espérance Tunis	27
(Democratic Republic of the Congo) JS Kinshasa	22
Tue 27 Oct 2015 – 18:00
(Tunisia) Club Africain	25
(Morocco) Widad Smara	23
Tue 27 Oct 2015 – 14:00
(Egypt) Alexandria SC	28
(Cameroon) FAP Yaoundé	24

Semi-finals
Wed 28 Oct 2015 – 17:30
(Egypt) Zamalek	34
(Tunisia) Espérance Tunis	33
Wed 28 Oct 2015 – 20:00
(Tunisia) Club Africain	29
(Egypt) Alexandria SC	23

Final
Fri 30 Oct 2015 – 16:30
(Egypt) Zamalek	35
(Tunisia) Club Africain	22
Third place
Fri 30 Oct 2015 – 12:00
(Egypt) Alexandria SC	24
(Tunisia) Espérance Tunis	23

5-8th bracket

5th-8th place
Wed 28 Oct 2015 – 15:00
(Egypt) Al Ahly	25
(Democratic Republic of the Congo) JS Kinshasa	20
Wed 28 Oct 2015 – 17:00
(Cameroon) FAP Yaoundé	28
(Morocco) Widad Smara	23

Fifth place
Thu 29 Oct 2015 – 18:00
(Egypt) Al Ahly	31
(Cameroon) FAP Yaoundé	26
Seventh place
Thu 29 Oct 2015 – 16:00
(Morocco) Widad Smara	25
(Democratic Republic of the Congo) JS Kinshasa	21

9-12th bracket

9th-12th place
Wed 28 Oct 2015 – 15:00
(Gabon) Stade Mandji	30
(Cameroon) Fanz	27
Wed 28 Oct 2015 – 09:00
(Nigeria) Niger United	39
(Morocco) Hilal Nador	36

Ninth place
Fri 30 Oct 2015 – 14:00
(Gabon) Stade Mandji	20
(Nigeria) Niger United	18
Eleventh place
Fri 30 Oct 2015 – 12:00
(Cameroon) Fanz	28
(Morocco) Hilal Nador	27

13-15th place

Tue, 27 Oct 2015
Police HBC (Rwanda)	33 (13:23) 45	(Republic of the Congo) Inter Club
Wed, 28 Oct 2015
Police HC (Democratic Republic of the Congo)	21 (13:13) 27	(Republic of the Congo) Inter Club
Thu, 29 Oct 2015
Police HBC (Rwanda)	32 (14:17) 37	(Democratic Republic of the Congo) Police HC

== Final standings ==
Rank	Team	Record
Gold medal	(Egypt) Al Zamalek	4–1
Silver medal	(Tunisia) Club Africain	4–1
Bronze medal	(Egypt) Alexandria SC	5–1
4	(Tunisia) Espérance Tunis	4–2
5	(Egypt) Al Ahly	5–1
6	(Cameroon) FAP Yaoundé	3–3
7	(Morocco) Widad Smara	3–3
8	(Democratic Republic of the Congo) JS Kinshasa	1–3
9	(Gabon) Stade Mandji	3–2
10	(Nigeria) Niger United	2–3
11	(Cameroon) Fanz	1–3
12	(Morocco) Hilal de Nador	1–4
13	(Republic of the Congo) Inter Club	2–3
14	(Democratic Republic of the Congo) Police HC	1–4
15	(Rwanda) Police HBC	0–5

Qualified to the 2016 IHF Super Globe

== Awards ==
2015 African Handball Champions League Winner

Al Zamalek Handball Club
9th title

Most Valuable Player

== See also ==
2015 African Handball Cup Winners' Cup
