= Association Sportive d'Hammamet H.C. =

Tunisian handball team

^{Association Sportive d'Hammamet H.C}
- Full name: Association Sportive d'Hammamet Handball Club
- Founded: 1945
- Arena: Salle d'Hammamet, Hammamet, Tunisia
- Capacity: 2,500
- League: National A
- 2021–22: National A, 6th
- Club colours
Home	Away

Association Sportive d'Hammamet H.C (Arabic: الجمعية الرياضية بالحمامات ) is a Tunisian handball team based in Hammamet, Tunisia, that plays in Tunisian Professional Handball League.

== Honours ==
=== National titles ===
Tunisian Handball Cup:

- (gold) Winners: 2011–12

African Men's Handball Cup Winners' Cup:

- Runner-up: 2003, 2013, 2017

Arab Handball Championship of Winners' Cup:

- Runner-up: 2017

Arab Handball Championship of Champions:

- Runner-up: 2021

== Famous Players ==
- (Tunisia) Wael Jallouz
- (Tunisia) Rayan Aribi
- (Angola) Sérgio Lopes
