= JSE Skikda =

- Full name: Jeunesse Sportive Espérance de Skikda
- Short name: JSES
- Founded: 1936; 90 years ago
- League: Algerian Handball Championship

Jeunesse Sportive Espérance de Skikda, also known as JSE Skikda is an Algerian handball club from Skikda.

The club has won the Algerian Handball Championship three times, and the Algerian Handball Cup once.

== Honours ==
=== National titles ===
- Algerian Handball Championship
  - Winners (3): 1966, 2015, 2020
- Algerian Handball Cup
  - Winners (1): 2020
- Algerian Super Cup
  - Winners (1): 2015
