= JS Kinshasa =

- Full name: Jeunesse Sportive de Kinshasa
- Ground: Stade des Martyrs; Kinshasa, DR Congo
- Capacity: 80,000
- League: Linafoot
- 2024/25: 1st

Jeunesse Sportive de Kinshasa is a Congolese multisports club based in Kinshasa.

== Football ==
The football team currently playing in the Linafoot, the first level of the Congolese football.

== Handball ==
The clubs' handball team reached the final of the 2023 African Handball Champions League, where they lost to Al Ahly.

== Titles ==
=== Football ===
- EPFKIN
  - Champion : 2018
- Supercoupe de Kinshasa
  - Winner : 2018
- Linafoot Ligue 2
  - Champion : 2020

=== Handball ===
National Compétitions

- Congolese Cup
  - Winner : 2010, 2011, 2012, 2013, 2014, 2015, 2016, 2017, 2018, 2019, 2021

African Handball Champions League

- Finalist: 2023
- 4th place: 2018, 2019

African Men's Handball Cup Winners' Cup

- 4th place: 2018, 2021
