= Yehia El-Deraa =

Egyptian handball player (born 1995)

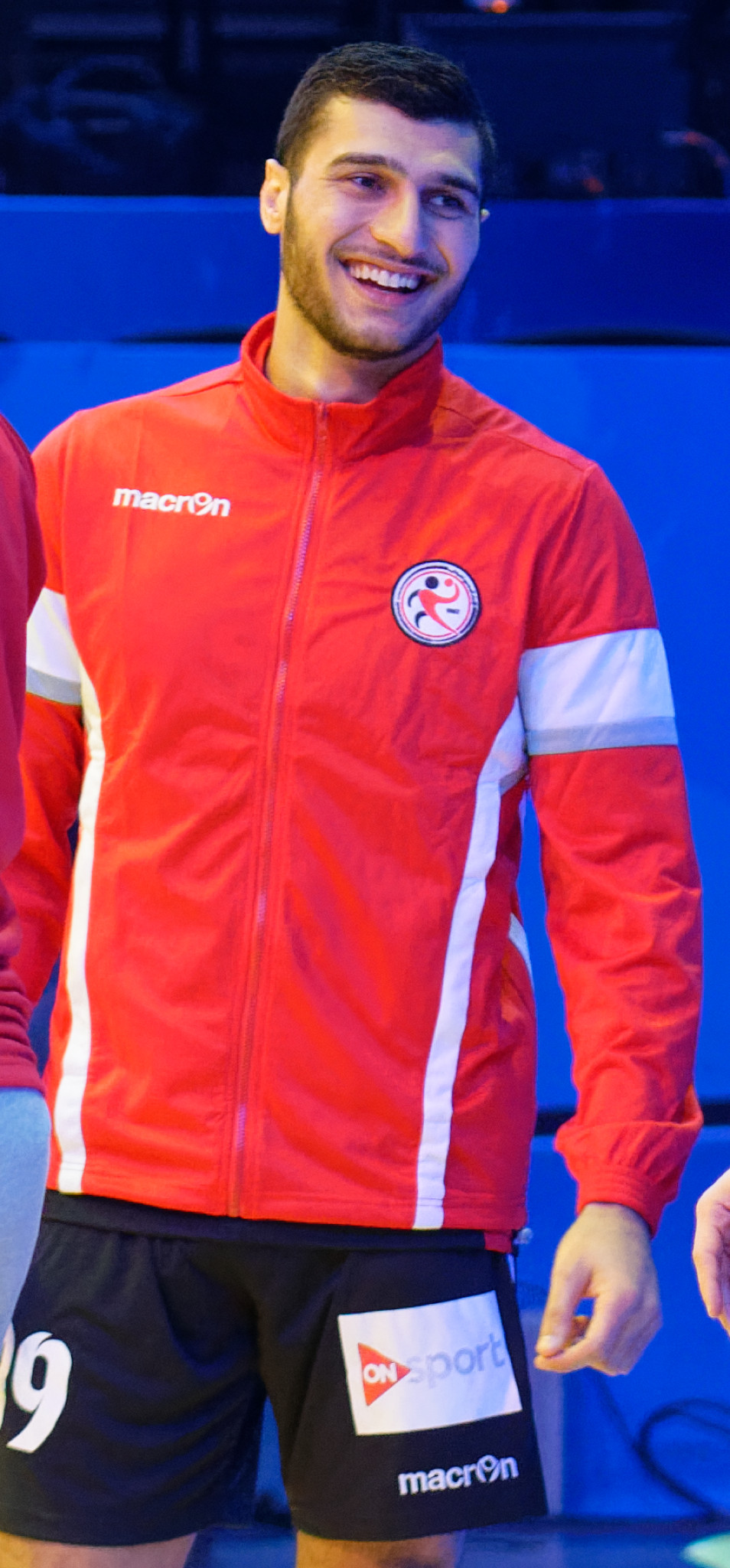
- El-Deraa in 2017

Personal information
- Full name: Yehia Mohamed Yehia El-Deraa
- Nationality: Egyptian
- Born: 17 July 1995 (age 31) Cairo, Egypt
- Height: 1.92 m (6 ft 4 in)

Sport
- Sport: Handball
- Position: Left back/Centre back
- Current club: ONE Veszprém
- Number: 39

Senior clubs
- Years: Team
- –2016: Heliopolis
- 2016–2017: Al Ahly
- 2017–2018: Ribe-Esbjerg HH
- 2018–2022: Zamalek
- 2022–: ONE Veszprém
National team
| Years | Team | Apps |
| – | Egypt | 145 |
Medal record
African Championship
| Gold medal – first place | 2020 Tunisia |
| Gold medal – first place | 2022 Egypt |
| Gold medal – first place | 2024 Egypt |
| Gold medal – first place | 2026 Rwanda |
Mediterranean Games
| Silver medal – second place | 2022 Oran | Team |

Yehia Mohamed Yehia El-Deraa (Arabic: يحيى محمد يحيى الدرع; also spelled Elderaa, born 17 July 1995) is an Egyptian handball player for ONE Veszprém and the Egyptian national team.

He represented Egypt at the World Men's Handball Championship in 2015, 2017, 2019, 2021, 2023 and in the 2016 Summer Olympics, 2020 Summer Olympics and 2024 Summer Olympics.

== Honours ==
Club

Heliopolis SC

- Egyptian Cup: 2015

Al Ahly SC

- Egyptian League: 2016–17
- African Champions League: 2016
- African Cup Winners' Cup: 2017
- African Super Cup: 2017

Zamalek SC

- Egyptian League: 2018–19, 2019–20, 2020–21
- African Champions League: 2018, 2019
- African Super Cup: 2018, 2019, 2021

Veszprém KC

- Nemzeti Bajnokság I: 2022–23, 2023–24, 2024–25, 2025–26
- Magyar Kupa: 2022–23, 2023–24, 2025–26
- Super Globe: 2024, 2026

International

Egypt

- African Championship: 2020, 2022, 2024, 2026

Individual

- MVP at 2020 African Championship
- Best Left Back at 2024 African Championship
