= Mohamed Ibrahim Ramadan =

Egyptian handball player

Mohamed Ramadan
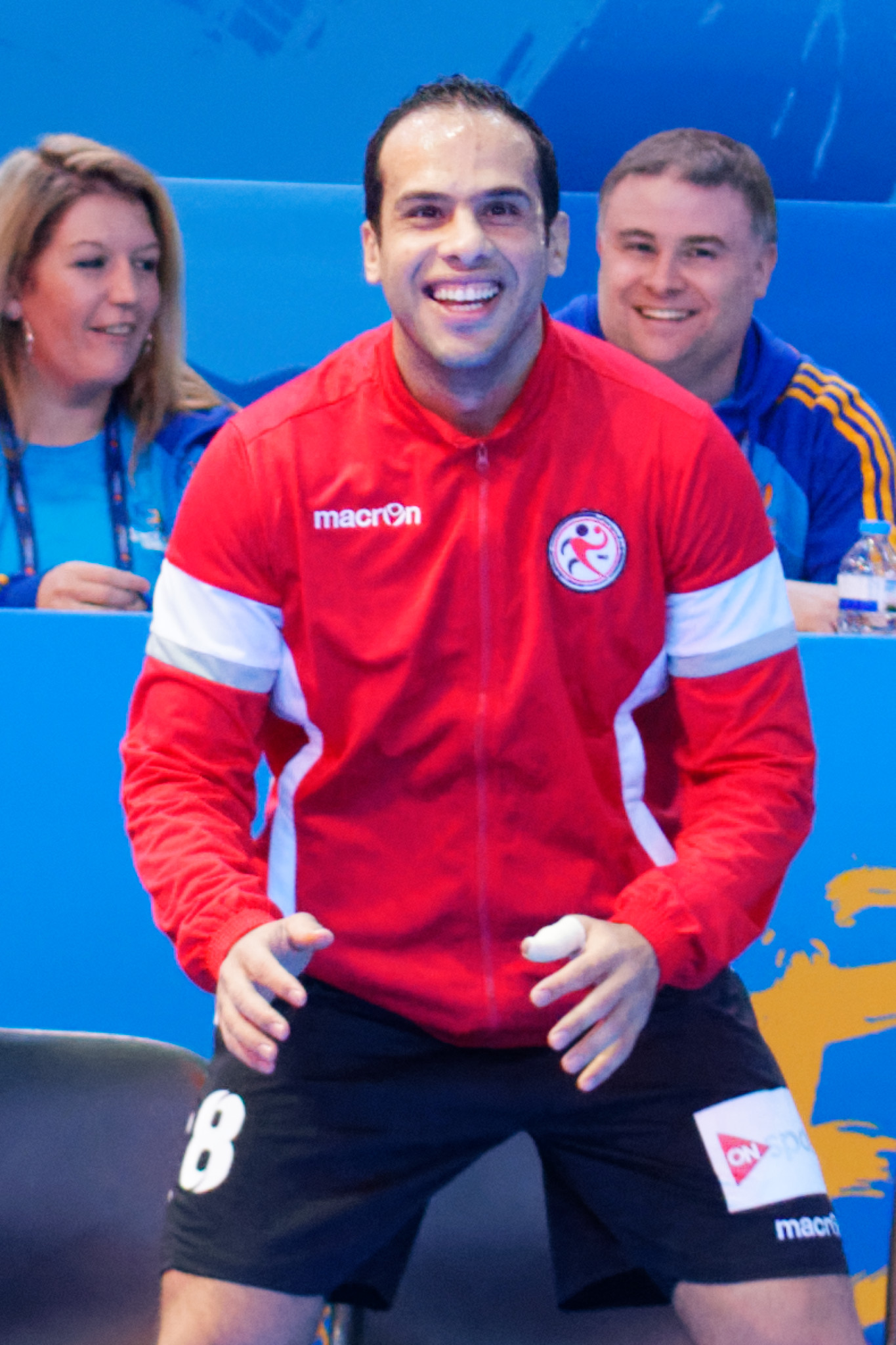
- Mohamed Ramadan in 2017

Personal information
- Full name: Mohamed Ibrahim Ramadan
- Nationality: Egyptian
- Born: 7 March 1984 (age 42)
- Height: 1.87 m (6 ft 2 in)

Sport
- Sport: Handball
- Position: Pivot
- Current club: Al Ahly
- Number: 8

Senior clubs
- Years: Team
- 2006-present: Al Ahly
National team
Years	Team	Apps	(Gls)
2007-	Egypt	178	(633)

Mohamed Ibrahim Ramadan (Arabic: محمد رمضانborn 7 March 1984) is an Egyptian handball player, playing for Al Ahly and the Egyptian national team.

He competed at the 2008 Summer Olympics, where the Egyptian team placed 10th, and at the 2016 Summer Olympics, where they placed 9th.

== Honours ==
=== National team ===
African Championship

- Winner (2): 2008 Angola, 2016 Egypt
- Runners-up: 2010 Egypt, 2018 Gabon

Mediterranean Games

- Gold Medalist: Handball at the 2013 Mediterranean Games

== Club ==
=== Al Ahly ===
Egyptian Handball League

- (gold) Winner: (7) : 2005–06, 2007–08, 2011–12, 2012–13, 2013–14, 2016–17, 2017-18 .

Egypt Handball Cup

- (gold) Winner: (2) : 2008–09, 2013-14 .

IHF Super Globe

- Runners-up: 2007 IHF Super Globe

African Super Cup

- Winner: (1) 2017 Aghadir

African Champions League

- Winner:(2) 2012 Tangier, Ouagadougou 2016

African Cup Winners' Cup

- Winner: (3) 2013 Hamammat, 2017 Aghadir, 2018 Cairo

Arab Championship of Champions

- Winner :(1) 2010 Cairo

Arab Handball Championship of Winners' Cup

- Winner :(1) 2011 Makkah
