= Islam Hassan =

Egyptian handball player (born 1988)

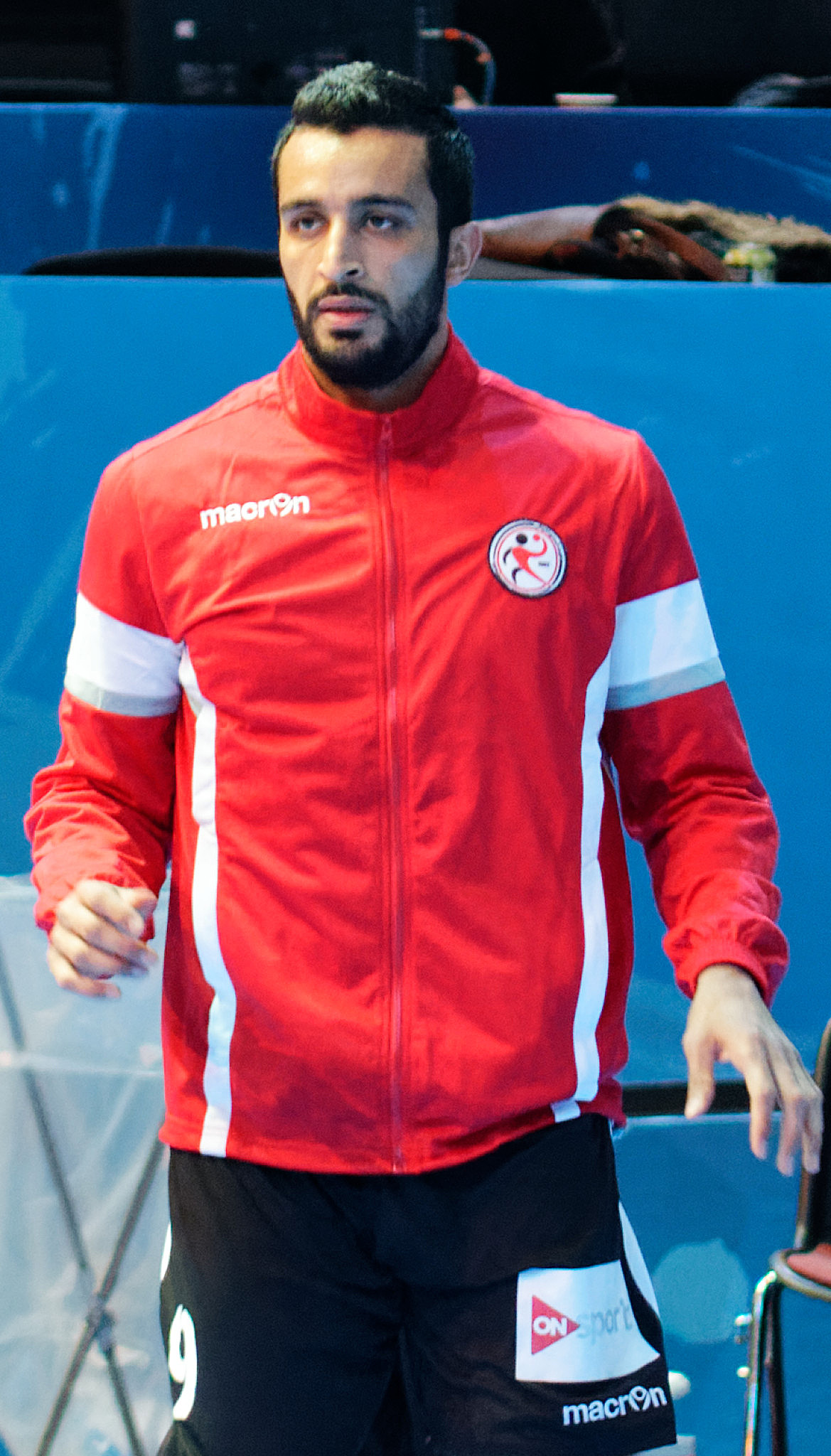
- Islam Hassan in 2017

Personal information
- Nationality: Egyptian
- Born: 2 July 1988 (age 38)
- Height: 1.86 m (6 ft 1 in)

Sport
- Sport: Handball
- Position: Center back
- Current club: Al-Wehda Club
- Number: 44

Senior clubs
- Years: Team
- 2009-2013: Al Ahly SC
- 2013-2014: Aigle sportif de Téboulba
- 2014-2015: Club Africain
- 2014-2015: Al-Gharafa SC
- 2015-: Al Wehda FC
National team
Years	Team	Apps	(Gls)
2009–	Egypt	194	(127)
Medal record
African Championship
Gold medal – first place	2016 Egypt
Silver medal – second place	2018 Gabon
Bronze medal – third place	2012 Morocco
Bronze medal – third place	2014 Algeria
Mediterranean Games
Gold medal – first place	2013 Mersin	Team
- Updated on 11 September 2021

Islam Hassan (Arabic: إسلام حسن) also known as Eslam Issa or Eslam Eissa (إسلام عيسى) (born 2 July 1988) is an Egyptian handball player for Saudi Arabian captains club Al-Wehda Club and the Egyptian national team. He has also played for clubs in Tunisia and Qatar.

== Honours ==
=== National team ===
- African Championship: Winner: 2016 Egypt; Runners-up:2018 Gabon
- Mediterranean Games: Gold Medalist: Handball at the 2013 Mediterranean Games

== Club ==
=== Al Ahly ===
- Egyptian Handball League: (gold) Winner: 2011–12, 2012–13, 2013–14, 2016–17, 2017-18 .
- Egypt Handball Cup: (gold) Winner: (2) : 2008–09, 2013–14
- African Super Cup: Winner: (1) 2017 Aghadir
- African Champions League: Winner:(2) 2012 Tangier, Ouagadougou 2016
- African Cup Winners' Cup: Winner: (3) 2013 Hamammat, 2017 Aghadir, 2018 Cairo
- Arab Championship of Champions: Winner :(1) 2010 Cairo
- Arab Handball Championship of Winners' Cup: Winner :(1) 2011 Makkah

=== Club African ===
- Tunisian Handball League: (gold) Winner: 2014-15 .
- Tunisian Handball League: (gold) Winner: 2014–15
- African Super Cup: Winner: (1) 2015 Gabon
- African Champions League: Winner:(1) 2014 Tunis, Ouagadougou 2016
