= Clubs with the most international titles in handball =

The Most International titles in handball is a list of handball teams around the world with most international titles representing all the International Handball Federation Affiliated Confederations such as the Asian Handball Federation (AHF), African Handball Confederation (CAHB), European Handball Federation (EHF), North America and the Caribbean Handball Confederation (NACHC), Oceania Continent Handball Federation (OCHF), and the South and Central America Handball Confederation (SCAHC).

Regional Titles are not accounted in this list because it does not affiliated with the International Handball Federation Competitions.

== Top 10 ==
Pos.	Team	Titles	Continental	Trophies
1	(Algeria) MC Alger	29	CAHB	(11) African Handball Champions League + (9) African Handball Cup Winners' Cup + (9) African Handball Super Cup
2	(Spain) FC Barcelona	28	EHF	(5) IHF Super Globe + (12) EHF Champions League + (5) EHF Cup Winner's Cup + (1) EHF Cup + (5) European Super Cup
3	(Egypt) Zamalek SC	26	CAHB	(12) African Handball Champions League + (7) African Handball Cup Winners' Cup + (7) African Handball Super Cup
4	(Egypt) Al Ahly SC	19	CAHB	(9) African Handball Champions League + (5) African Handball Cup Winners' Cup + (5) African Handball Super Cup
5	(Germany) SC Magdeburg	14	EHF	(3) IHF Super Globe + (4) EHF Champions League + (4) EHF Confederation Cup + (3) EHF Men's Champions Trophy
6	(Germany) VfL Gummersbach	13	EHF	(5) EHF Champions League + (4) EHF Cup Winner's Cup + (2) EHF Cup + (2) EHF Men's Champions Trophy
7	(Spain) BM Ciudad Real	10	EHF	(3) EHF Champions League + (3) EHF Men's Champions Trophy + (2) EHF Cup Winner's Cup + (2) IHF Super Globe
=	(Germany) THW Kiel	10	EHF	(4) EHF Champions League + (4) EHF Cup + (1) EHF Men's Champions Trophy + (1) IHF Super Globe
9	(Australia) Sydney University	8	OCHF	(8) Oceania Handball Champions Cup
10	(Tunisia) Club Africain	7	CAHB	(1) African Handball Champions League + (5) African Handball Cup Winners' Cup + (1) African Handball Super Cup

== Countries with most teams in top 10 ==
Pos.	Country	Teams #	Top 3	Top 5	Top 10
1	Egypt	2	1	2	2
2	Spain	2	1	1	2
3	Algeria	1	1	1	1
4	Germany	3	0	2	3
5	Australia	1	0	0	1
=	Tunisia	1	0	0	1

== Countries with most titles in top 10 ==
Pos.	Country	Titles #
1	Egypt	41
2	Spain	37
=	Germany	37
4	Algeria	29
5	Australia	8
6	Tunisia	7
