= Khairy =

Khairy is an Arab-based given name and surname. Notable persons with the name or surname include:

== People with the given name ==
- Khairy Beshara (born 1947), Egyptian film director
- Khairy Hirzalla, Jordanian painter
- Khairy Jamaluddin (born 1976), commonly known as KJ, Malaysian politician and government minister
- Sheikh Khairy Khedr (????-2014), Founder and commander of the Yezidi militia Malik Al-Tawus, which later became known as the Sinjar Resistance
- Khairy Shalaby (1938-2011), Egyptian novelist and writer
- Khairy Alzahaby (born 1946), Syrian novelist and thinker, historian and columnist and scenarist

== People with the surname ==
- Abla Khairy (born 1961), Egyptian swimmer
- Ahmed Khairy (athlete), Egyptian sprinter
- Ahmed Khairy (footballer), Egyptian footballer
- Ahmed Khairy (handballer), Egyptian handball player
- Mohamed Khairy (born 1981), Egyptian snooker player
- Mohamed Khairy (equestrian) (born 1919), Egyptian equestrian
- Najat El-Khairy, Canadian artist of Palestinian origin, collector and lecturer on Palestinian embroidery
- Omer Khairy (1939–1999), Sudanese modern painter

== See also ==
- Khairy Pasha Palace, neo-Mamluk building and former palace of Khairy Pasha in Cairo,
