= 2018 African Handball Super Cup =

Tournament details
- Host country: Egypt
- Venue(s): 1 (in 1 host city)
- Dates: 12 April 2018
- Teams: 4 (from 3 confederations)

Final positions
- Champions: (Egypt) Zamalek (5th title) (Angola) 1º de Agosto (4th title)
- Runner-up: (Egypt) Al Ahly SC (Cameroon) FAP Yaoundé

Tournament statistics
- Matches played: 2
- Goals scored: 90 (45 per match)

The 2018 African Handball Super Cup (24th edition), also known as Babacar Fall Super Cup, in honour of the first chairman of the African Handball Confederation, was a handball competition organized by the African Handball Confederation, under the auspices of the International Handball Federation, the handball sport governing body. The matches, held on 12 April 2018 at the Salle Omnisport Al Inbiâat, in Cairo, Egypt, were contested by Zamalek, the 2017 African Handball Champions League winner and Al Ahly, the 2017 African Handball Cup Winners' Cup winner, on the man's side and Clube Desportivo Primeiro de Agosto, the 2017 African Women's Handball Champions League winner and FAP Yaoundé, the 2017 African Women's Handball Cup Winners' Cup runner-up (Primeiro de Agosto was the winner as well). Zamalek, on the man's side and Primeiro de Agosto, on the woman's side, were the winners.

== 2018 Africa Men's Handball Super Cup ==
Thu, 12 Apr 2018; 18:00 WEST (UTC+1)	Zamalek (Egypt)	21–20	(Egypt) Al Ahly	Cairo, Egypt
Thu, 12 Apr 2018; 18:00 WEST (UTC+1)		(09–10)		Cairo, Egypt

== 2018 Africa Women's Handball Super Cup ==
Thu, 12 Apr 2018; 16:00 WEST (UTC+1)	1º de Agosto (Angola)	26–23	(Cameroon) FAP Yaoundé	Cairo, Egypt
Thu, 12 Apr 2018; 16:00 WEST (UTC+1)		(14–14)		Cairo, Egypt

== Awards ==
2018 Africa Men's Handball Super Cup Winners	2018 Africa Women's Handball Super Cup Winners
Al Zamalek Handball Club; 5th title	Clube Desportivo Primeiro de Agosto; 4th title

== See also ==
- 2018 African Handball Champions League
- 2018 African Women's Handball Champions League
- 2018 African Handball Cup Winners' Cup
- 2018 African Women's Handball Cup Winners' Cup
