= Ahmed Abdelrahman =

Ahmed Abdelrahman may refer to:

- Ahmed Abdelrahman (handballer) (born 1984), Egyptian handball player
- Ahmed Abdelrahman (judoka) (born 1996), Egyptian judoka
