= Abla (name) =

Abla is both a given name and a surname. It is a feminine Muslim name, meaning 'perfectly formed'. Notable people with the name include:

== People with the given name ==
- Abla Farhoud (1945–2021), Lebanese-born Canadian writer
- Abla Kamel (born 1960), Egyptian actress
- Abla Khairy (born 1961), Egyptian swimmer
- Abla Mehio Sibai, Lebanese professor
- Lalla Abla bint Tahar (1909–1992), Moroccan princess
- ʿAbla, love of Antarah ibn Shaddad

== Fictitious character ==
- Abla Fahita, Egyptian satirical puppet character

== People with the surname ==
- Diana Abla (born 1995), Brazilian water polo player
- Mohamed Abla (born 1953), Egyptian artist
