= Mohamed Amer (handballer) =

Egyptian handball player

Personal information
- Nationality: Egyptian
- Born: 12 December 1987 (age 38)
- Height: 1.86 m (6 ft 1 in)

Sport
- Sport: Handball
- Position: Right wing
- Current club: Al Ahly
National team
Years	Team	Apps	(Gls)
–	Egypt	150	(498)

Mohamed Amer (born 12 December 1987) is an Egyptian handball player for Al Ahly and the Egyptian national team.
