= Hady Shahin =

Egyptian handball player

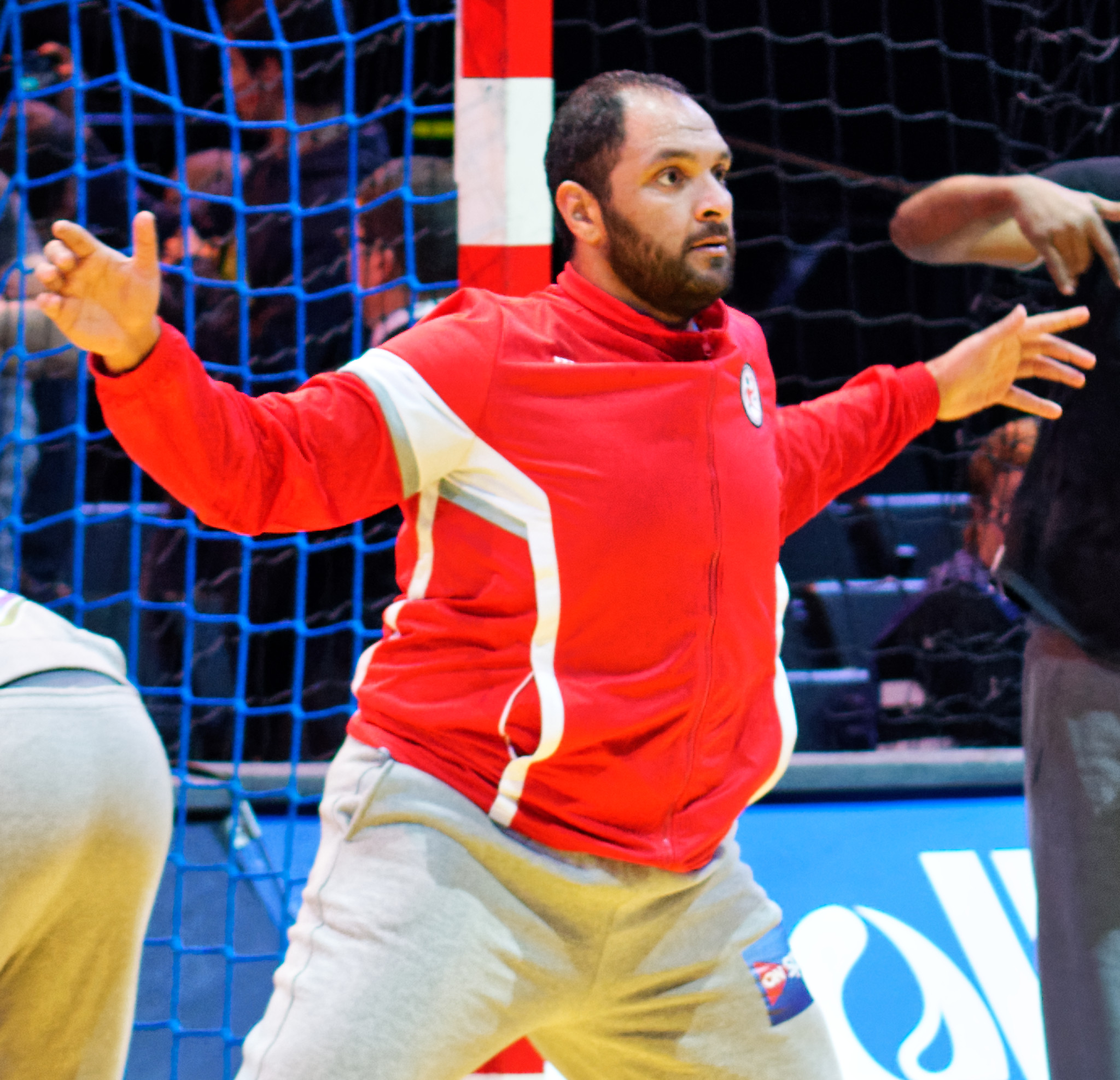

Personal information
- Nationality: Egyptian
- Born: 2 September 1986 (age 40)
- Height: 1.96 m (6 ft 5 in)

Sport
- Sport: Handball
- Position: Goalkeeper
- Current club: Al Ahly
National team
Years	Team	Apps	(Gls)
–	Egypt	180	(0)

Hady Shahin (born 2 September 1986) is an Egyptian handball player for Heliopolis SC and the Egyptian national team.

He participated at the 2017 World Men's Handball Championship.
