= Ibrahim El-Masry (handballer) =

Egyptian handball player

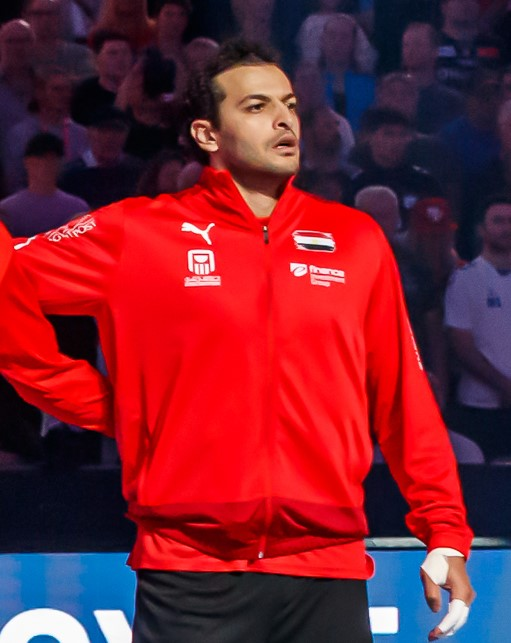

Personal information
- Nationality: Egyptian
- Born: 11 March 1989 (age 37) Cairo, Egypt
- Height: 1.95 m (6 ft 5 in)

Sport
- Sport: Handball
- Position: Pivot
- Current club: Al Ahly
- Number: 24

Senior clubs
- Years: Team
- 2007-2010: Al-Nady SC 6th October
- 2010-2013: Ittihad El-Shorta
- 2013-: Al Ahly
National team
Years	Team	Apps
–	Egypt	295
Medal record
African Championship
Gold medal – first place	2022 Egypt
Gold medal – first place	2024 Egypt
Gold medal – first place	2026 Rwanda
Mediterranean Games
Gold medal – first place	2013 Mersin	Team
Silver medal – second place	2022 Oran	Team

Ibrahim El-Masry (Arabic: إبراهيم المصري; born 11 March 1989) is an Egyptian handball player for Al Ahly and the Egyptian national team. He is known as a defensive specialist.

He represented Egypt at the World Men's Handball Championship in 2013, 2015, 2017, 2019, and 2021, and in the 2016 and 2024 Summer Olympics.

He has won gold medals at the 2013 Mediterranean Games and the 2022 and 2024 Afrcan Championships.

At the 2025 world championship he once again represented Egypt, playing 7 games and scoring 1 goal, when the team finished 5th.
