= Ahmed Khairy (handballer) =

Egyptian handball player

Personal information
- Nationality: Egyptian
- Born: 15 September 1994 (age 32) Cairo, Egypt
- Height: 1.90 m (6 ft 3 in)

Sport
- Sport: Handball
- Position: Centre back
- Current club: Al Ahly
- Number: 17

Senior clubs
- Years: Team
- 2013–2018: Al Gazira
- 2018–2020: Al Ahly
- 2020–2021: Steaua București
- 2021–2022: CS Dinamo București
- 2022–2025: Al Ahly
- 2025–2026: SC DHfK Leipzig Handball
- 2026–: Al Ahly
National team
Years	Team	Apps
–	Egypt	91
Medal record
African Championship
Gold medal – first place	2022 Tunisia
Gold medal – first place	2022 Egypt
Gold medal – first place	2024 Egypt

Ahmed Khairy (born 15 September 1994) is an Egyptian handball player for Al Ahly and the Egyptian national team.

He participated at the 2017, 2019 and 2023 2025 World Championships.

== Honours club ==
- Egyptian League
  - Winner: 2022–23, 2023–24, 2024–25
- Egyptian Cup
  - Winner: 2018–19, 2019–20, 2022–23, 2024–25
- Egyptian Super Cup
  - Winner: 2023–24, 2024–25
- Romanian League
  - Winner: 2021–22
- Romanian Cup
  - Winner: 2021–22
- African Champions League
  - Winner: 2023, 2024, 2025
- African Super Cup
  - Winner: 2022–23, 2023–24, 2024–25
