= 2017 African Handball Champions League =

Tournament details
- Host country: Tunisia
- Venues: 3 (in 1 host city)
- Dates: October 20–29
- Teams: 14 (from 1 confederation)

Final positions
- Champions: (Egypt) Zamalek (10th title)
- Runners-up: (Tunisia) Espérance Tunis
- Third place: (Egypt) Al Ahly
- Fourth place: (Tunisia) AS Hammamet

The 2017 African Handball Champions League was the 39th edition, organized by the African Handball Confederation, under the auspices of the International Handball Federation, the handball sport governing body. The tournament was held from October 20–29, 2017 at the salles Hammamet and Nabeul in Hammamet, Tunisia, contested by 14 teams and won by Zamalek of Egypt.

Zamalek qualified to the 2018 IHF Super Globe.

== Draw ==
Group A	Group B	Group C
APR Rwanda (Republic of the Congo) AS Caïman (Cameroon) FAP Yaoundé (Tunisia) Espérance de Tunis (Democratic Republic of the Congo) JS Kinshasa	(Libya) Al-Ittihad; Phoenix Gabon (Ivory Coast) Red Star (Morocco) Widad Smara (Egypt) Zamalek	(Egypt) Al Ahly (Tunisia) AS Hammamet (Cameroon) Fanz (Democratic Republic of the Congo) HC Oka

== Preliminary rounds ==
Times given below are in CET UTC+1.

=== Group A ===
Fri, 20 Oct 2017
Espérance (Tunisia)	58 (30:10) 20	APR Rwanda
FAP Yaoundé (Cameroon)	26 (15:15) 28	(Democratic Republic of the Congo) JS Kinshasa
Sat, 21 Oct 2017
APR Rwanda	19 (12:18) 42	(Republic of the Congo) AS Caïman
JS Kinshasa (Democratic Republic of the Congo)	25 (09:16) 32	(Tunisia) Espérance
Sun, 22 Oct 2017
AS Caïman (Republic of the Congo)	21 (12:10) 24	(Cameroon) FAP Yaoundé
APR Rwanda	15 (04:20) 43	(Democratic Republic of the Congo) JS Kinshasa
Tue, 24 Oct 2017
AS Caïman (Republic of the Congo)	32 (-:-) 36	(Democratic Republic of the Congo) JS Kinshasa
FAP Yaoundé (Cameroon)	22 (11:11) 29	(Tunisia) Espérance
Wed, 25 Oct 2017
Espérance (Tunisia)	33 (14:16) 32	(Republic of the Congo) AS Caïman
FAP Yaoundé (Cameroon)	41 (18:14) 27	APR Rwanda

Team	Pld	W	D	L	GF	GA	GDIF	Pts
(Tunisia) Espérance	4	4	0	0	152	99	+53	8
(Democratic Republic of the Congo) JS Kinshasa	4	3	0	1	132	105	+27	6
(Cameroon) FAP Yaoundé	4	2	0	2	113	105	+8	4
(Republic of the Congo) AS Caïman	4	1	0	3	127	112	+15	2
APR Rwanda	4	0	0	4	81	184	-103	0

- Note: Advance to quarter-finals
  Relegated to 9th place classification
  Relegated to 13th place classification

=== Group B ===
Fri, 20 Oct 2017
Widad Smara (Morocco)	25 (13:10) 24	(Libya) Al-Ittihad
Zamalek (Egypt)	38 (-:-) 24	(Ivory Coast) Red Star
Sat, 21 Oct 2017
Al-Ittihad (Libya)	19 (08:19) 39	(Egypt) Zamalek
Phoenix Gabon	24 (11:13) 25	(Morocco) Widad Smara
Sun, 22 Oct 2017
Widad Smara (Morocco)	29 (15:13) 29	(Ivory Coast) Red Star
Phoenix Gabon	26 (12:03) 15	(Libya) Al-Ittihad
Tue, 24 Oct 2017
Zamalek (Egypt)	33 (17:13) 22	Phoenix Gabon
Red Star (Ivory Coast)	22 (-:-) 26	(Libya) Al-Ittihad
Wed, 25 Oct 2017
Zamalek (Egypt)	40 (20:12) 28	(Morocco) Widad Smara
Red Star (Ivory Coast)	21 (10:13) 23	Phoenix Gabon

Team	Pld	W	D	L	GF	GA	GDIF	Pts
(Egypt) Zamalek	4	4	0	0	150	93	+57	8
(Morocco) Widad Smara	4	2	1	1	107	117	-10	5
Phoenix Gabon	4	2	0	2	95	94	+1	4
(Libya) Al-Ittihad	4	1	0	3	84	112	-28	2
(Ivory Coast) Red Star	4	0	1	3	96	116	-20	1

- Note: Advance to quarter-finals
  Relegated to 9th place classification
  Relegated to 13th place classification

=== Group C ===
Fri, 20 Oct 2017
Hammamet (Tunisia)	36 (21:13) 20	(Democratic Republic of the Congo) HC Oka
Sat, 21 Oct 2017
Al Ahly (Egypt)	33 (17:05) 12	(Democratic Republic of the Congo) HC Oka
Sun, 22 Oct 2017
Hammamet (Tunisia)	31 (16:11) 22	(Cameroon) Fanz
Tue, 24 Oct 2017
Al Ahly (Egypt)	34 (-:-) 19	(Cameroon) Fanz
Wed, 25 Oct 2017
Al Ahly (Egypt)	26 (10:15) 26	(Tunisia) Hammamet
Fanz (Cameroon)	30 (18:09) 22	(Democratic Republic of the Congo) HC Oka

Team	Pld	W	D	L	GF	GA	GDIF	Pts
(Egypt) Al Ahly	3	2	1	0	93	57	+36	5
(Tunisia) AS Hammamet	3	2	1	0	93	68	+25	5
(Cameroon) Fanz	3	1	0	2	71	87	-16	2
(Democratic Republic of the Congo) HC Oka	3	0	0	3	54	99	-45	0

- Note: Advance to quarter-finals
  Relegated to 9th place classification

== Knockout stage ==
Championship bracket

Quarter-finals
Fri 26 Oct 2017 – 14:00
(Egypt) Zamalek	26
(Cameroon) FAP Yaoundé	21
Fri 26 Oct 2017 – 18:00
(Egypt) Al Ahly	30
(Democratic Republic of the Congo) JS Kinshasa	15
Fri 26 Oct 2017 – 16:00
(Tunisia) Espérance Tunis	38
Phoenix Gabon	24
Fri 26 Oct 2017 – 16:00
(Tunisia) Hammamet	31
(Morocco) Widad Smara	26

Semi-finals
Sat 28 Oct 2017 – 16:15
(Egypt) Zamalek	26
(Egypt) Al Ahly	21
Sat 28 Oct 2017 – 18:30
(Tunisia) Espérance Tunis	30
(Tunisia) Hammamet	24

Final
Sun 30 Oct 2017 – 18:00
(Egypt) Zamalek	31
(Tunisia) Espérance Tunis	29
Third place
Sun 30 Oct 2017 – 14:00
(Egypt) Al Ahly	23
(Tunisia) Hammamet	21

5-8th bracket

5–8th place
Sat 28 Oct 2017 – 16:00
(Cameroon) FAP Yaoundé	22
(Democratic Republic of the Congo) JS Kinshasa	21
Sat 28 Oct 2017 – 14:00
Phoenix Gabon	33
(Morocco) Widad Smara	31

Fifth place
Sun 29 Oct 2017 – 14:45
Phoenix Gabon	19
(Cameroon) FAP Yaoundé	18
Seventh place
Sun 29 Oct 2017 – 11:15
(Democratic Republic of the Congo) JS Kinshasa	31
(Morocco) Widad Smara	22

9th place

Semi-finals
Thu 26 Oct 2017 – 14:00
(Republic of the Congo) AS Caïman	29
(Cameroon) Fanz	27
Thu 26 Oct 2017 – 16:00
(Libya) Al-Ittihad	28
(Democratic Republic of the Congo) HC Oka	24

Ninth place
Sat 28 Oct 2017 – 12:00
(Republic of the Congo) AS Caïman	29
(Libya) Al-Ittihad	28
Third place
Sat 28 Oct 2017 – 08:00
(Cameroon) Fanz	34
(Democratic Republic of the Congo) HC Oka	32

=== 9-12th classification ===
Thu, 26 Oct 2017
AS Caïman (Republic of the Congo)	29 (12:14) 27	(Cameroon) Fanz
Al-Ittihad (Libya)	28 (12:11) 24	(Democratic Republic of the Congo) HC Oka

=== Quarter-finals ===
Thu, 26 Oct 2017
Zamalek (Egypt)	26 (14:13) 21	(Cameroon) FAP Yaoundé
Widad Smara (Morocco)	26 (12:16) 31	(Tunisia) Hammamet
Espérance (Tunisia)	38 (16:10) 24	Phoenix Gabon
Al Ahly (Egypt)	30 (15:06) 15	(Democratic Republic of the Congo) JS Kinshasa

=== 13th place ===
Sat, 28 Oct 2017
APR Rwanda	27 (-:-) 35	(Ivory Coast) Red Star

=== 9th place classification ===
Sat, 28 Oct 2017
Al-Ittihad (Libya)	28 (13:13) 29	(Republic of the Congo) AS Caïman
Sun, 29 Oct 2017
Fanz (Cameroon)	30 (17:10) 20	(Libya) Al-Ittihad
AS Caïman (Republic of the Congo)	27 (12:11) 26	(Democratic Republic of the Congo) HC Oka

=== 5-8th classification ===
Sat, 28 Oct 2017
JS Kinshasa (Democratic Republic of the Congo)	21 (10:13) 22	(Cameroon) FAP Yaoundé
Phoenix Gabon	33 (15:14) 31	(Morocco) Widad Smara

=== Semi-finals ===
Sat, 28 Oct 2017
Al Ahly (Egypt)	21 (12:12) 26	(Egypt) Zamalek
Espérance (Tunisia)	30 (15:12) 24	(Tunisia) Hammamet

=== 7th place ===
Sun, 29 Oct 2017
Widad Smara (Morocco)	22 (11:15) 31	(Democratic Republic of the Congo) JS Kinshasa

=== 5th place ===
Sun, 29 Oct 2017
Phoenix Gabon	19 (10:13) 18	(Cameroon) FAP Yaoundé

=== 3rd place ===
Sun, 29 Oct 2017
Al Ahly (Egypt)	23 (11:09) 21	(Tunisia) Hammamet

=== Final ===
Sun, 29 Oct 2017
Zamalek (Egypt)	31 (12:13) 29	(Tunisia) Espérance

== Final standings ==
Rank	Team	Record
Gold medal	(Egypt) Zamalek	7–0
Silver medal	(Tunisia) Espérance Tunis	6–1
Bronze medal	(Egypt) Al Ahly	4–1
4	(Tunisia) AS Hammamet	3–2
5	Phoenix Gabon	4–3
6	(Cameroon) FAP Yaoundé	3–4
7	(Democratic Republic of the Congo) JS Kinshasa	4–3
8	(Morocco) Widad Smara	2–4
9	(Republic of the Congo) AS Caïman	4–3
10	(Cameroon) Fanz	2–3
11	(Libya) Al-Ittihad	2–5
12	(Democratic Republic of the Congo) HC Oka	0–5
13	(Ivory Coast) Red Star	1–3
14	APR Rwanda	0–5

Qualified to the 2018 IHF Super Globe

== Awards ==
2017 African Handball Champions League winner

Al Zamalek Sporting Club
10th title

Best Player

== See also ==
- 2017 African Handball Cup Winners' Cup
