= Ahmed Abdelrahman (handballer) =

Egyptian handball player

Personal information
- Nationality: Egyptian
- Born: 26 January 1984 (age 42)
- Height: 1.85 m (6 ft 1 in)

Sport
- Sport: Handball
- Position: Pivot
- Current club: Al Ahly
National team
Years	Team	Apps	(Gls)
–	Egypt	75	(300)
Medal record
African Championships
Gold medal – first place	2024 Egypt
Mediterranean Games
Gold medal – first place	2013 Mersin	Team

Ahmed Ali Abdelrahman (born 26 January 1984) is an Egyptian handball player for Al Ahly and the Egyptian national team.
