= 2024 IHF Men's Club World Championship =

Club handball world championship

2024 IHF Men’s Club World Championship

Tournament details
- Host country: Egypt
- Venue: 1 (in 1 host city)
- Dates: 27 September – 3 October
- Teams: 9 (from 6 confederations)

Final positions
- Champions: (Hungary) Telekom Veszprém (1st title)
- Runners-up: (Germany) SC Magdeburg
- Third place: (Egypt) Al Ahly
- Fourth place: (Spain) Barcelona

Tournament statistics
- Matches played: 18
- Goals scored: 1,163 (64.61 per match)
- Attendance: 9,595 (533 per match)
- Top scorers: Mojtaba Al-Salem (34 goals)

Awards
- Best player: Nedim Remili

‌The 2024 IHF Men’s Club World Championship is the 17th edition of the yearly club world championship in handball, held from 27 September to 3 October in New Administrative Capital, Egypt under the aegis of the International Handball Federation (IHF).

Telekom Veszprém secured their first title after a 34–33 win over SC Magdeburg in the final.

== Host ==
The contract with the Saudi Arabian Handball Federation was not extended. Instead the Egyptian Handball Federation received a contract for three editions. The tournament will be held in the New Capital Sports Hall in New Administrative Capital.

== Format ==
The nine teams will be split into three groups of three teams. The group winners and the best second-placed team advance to the semifinals. The remaining sides will play in placement games.

== Teams ==
Nine teams compete in the tournament: the winners of the continental tournaments, the defending champion, a host teams and a wild card team. On 10 July 2024, seven teams were named.

Team	Qualified as
(Germany) SC Magdeburg	Defending champion
(Egypt) Zamalek SC	Runner-up of African Handball Super Cup
(Saudi Arabia) Khaleej Club	Winner of Asian Club League Championship
(Australia) Sydney Uni HC	Winner of Oceania Handball Champions Cup
(United States) California Eagles	Winner of North American and Caribbean Senior Club Championship
(Brazil) Handebol Taubaté	Winner of South and Central American Men's Club Handball Championship
(Spain) Barcelona	Winner of EHF Champions League
(Egypt) Al Ahly	Host
(Hungary) Telekom Veszprém	Wildcard

- As Al-Ahly qualified as the host team, Zamalek took their place after placing second in the African qualification.

== Draw ==
The draw was held on 21 August 2024.

=== Seeding ===
Pot 1	Pot 2	Pot 3
(Germany) SC Magdeburg (Spain) Barcelona (Hungary) Telekom Veszprém	(Egypt) Al Ahly (Egypt) Zamalek SC (Saudi Arabia) Khaleej Club	(Brazil) Handebol Taubaté (United States) California Eagles (Australia) Sydney Uni HC

== Referees ==
The referee pairs were announced on 15 August 2024.

Referees
Bosnia and Herzegovina	Amar Konjičanin; Dino Konjičanin
Denmark	Mads Hansen; Jesper Madsen
Egypt	Heidy El-Saied; Yasmina El-Saied
France	Karim Gasmi; Raouf Gasmi

Referees
North Macedonia	Gjorgji Nachevski; Slave Nikolov
Montenegro	Ivan Pavićević; Miloš Ražnatović
Uruguay	Cristian Lemes; Mathías Sosa
Uzbekistan	Khasan Ismoilov; Khusan Ismoilov

== Preliminary round ==
All times are local (UTC+3).

=== Group A ===
Pos	Team	Pld	W	D	L	GF	GA	GD	Pts	Qualification
1	(Hungary) Telekom Veszprém	2	2	0	0	77	44	+33	4	Semifinals
2	(Egypt) Zamalek SC	2	1	0	1	57	59	−2	2	
3	(Brazil) Handebol Taubaté	2	0	0	2	42	73	−31	0	

Source: IHF
Rules for classification: 1) points; 2) head-to-head points; 3) head-to-head goal difference; 4) head-to-head number of goals scored; 5) goal difference.

27 September 2024; 21:00	Handebol Taubaté (Brazil)	25–30	(Egypt) Zamalek SC	New Capital Sports Hall, New Administrative Capital; Attendance: 200; Referees: Konjičanin, Konjičanin (BIH)
27 September 2024; 21:00	G. Da Silva, Perin 6	(6–18)	Omar 5	New Capital Sports Hall, New Administrative Capital; Attendance: 200; Referees: Konjičanin, Konjičanin (BIH)
27 September 2024; 21:00	1× (yellow card) 5× (suspension)	Report	5× (suspension)	New Capital Sports Hall, New Administrative Capital; Attendance: 200; Referees: Konjičanin, Konjičanin (BIH)

28 September 2024; 15:00	Telekom Veszprém (Hungary)	43–17	(Brazil) Handebol Taubaté	New Capital Sports Hall, New Administrative Capital; Attendance: 95; Referees: Gasmi, Gasmi (FRA)
28 September 2024; 15:00	Descat 10	(22–6)	Andrade, E. Da Silva 4	New Capital Sports Hall, New Administrative Capital; Attendance: 95; Referees: Gasmi, Gasmi (FRA)
28 September 2024; 15:00	1× (yellow card) 1× (suspension)	Report	1× (yellow card) 7× (suspension)	New Capital Sports Hall, New Administrative Capital; Attendance: 95; Referees: Gasmi, Gasmi (FRA)

29 September 2024; 17:30	Zamalek SC (Egypt)	27–34	(Hungary) Telekom Veszprém	New Capital Sports Hall, New Administrative Capital; Attendance: 800; Referees: Hansen, Madsen (DEN)
29 September 2024; 17:30	El-Ahmar, Yosri 4	(15–18)	Grahovac, Sandell 5	New Capital Sports Hall, New Administrative Capital; Attendance: 800; Referees: Hansen, Madsen (DEN)
29 September 2024; 17:30	1× (yellow card) 7× (suspension) 1× (red card)	Report	5× (suspension)	New Capital Sports Hall, New Administrative Capital; Attendance: 800; Referees: Hansen, Madsen (DEN)

=== Group B ===
Pos	Team	Pld	W	D	L	GF	GA	GD	Pts	Qualification
1	(Spain) Barcelona	2	2	0	0	84	46	+38	4	Semifinals
2	(Egypt) Al Ahly	2	1	0	1	72	46	+26	2	Semifinals
3	(Australia) Sydney Uni HC	2	0	0	2	38	102	−64	0	

Source: IHF
Rules for classification: 1) points; 2) head-to-head points; 3) head-to-head goal difference; 4) head-to-head number of goals scored; 5) goal difference.

27 September 2024; 18:30	Sydney Uni HC (Australia)	15–49	(Egypt) Al Ahly	New Capital Sports Hall, New Administrative Capital; Attendance: 500; Referees: Lemes, Sosa (URU)
27 September 2024; 18:30	three players 3	(6–20)	Dahroug 9	New Capital Sports Hall, New Administrative Capital; Attendance: 500; Referees: Lemes, Sosa (URU)
27 September 2024; 18:30	1× (yellow card) 6× (suspension)	Report	3× (suspension)	New Capital Sports Hall, New Administrative Capital; Attendance: 500; Referees: Lemes, Sosa (URU)

28 September 2024; 20:00	Barcelona (Spain)	53–23	(Australia) Sydney Uni HC	New Capital Sports Hall, New Administrative Capital; Attendance: 350; Referees: Ismoilov, Ismoilov (UZB)
28 September 2024; 20:00	Ortega 9	(27–12)	Messerschmidt 7	New Capital Sports Hall, New Administrative Capital; Attendance: 350; Referees: Ismoilov, Ismoilov (UZB)
28 September 2024; 20:00	6× (suspension)	Report	2× (suspension)	New Capital Sports Hall, New Administrative Capital; Attendance: 350; Referees: Ismoilov, Ismoilov (UZB)

29 September 2024; 20:00	Al Ahly (Egypt)	23–31	(Spain) Barcelona	New Capital Sports Hall, New Administrative Capital; Attendance: 1,000; Referees: Pavićević, Ražnatović (MNE)
29 September 2024; 20:00	Adel 6	(10–17)	Gómez 6	New Capital Sports Hall, New Administrative Capital; Attendance: 1,000; Referees: Pavićević, Ražnatović (MNE)
29 September 2024; 20:00	1× (yellow card) 2× (suspension)	Report	4× (suspension)	New Capital Sports Hall, New Administrative Capital; Attendance: 1,000; Referees: Pavićević, Ražnatović (MNE)

=== Group C ===
Pos	Team	Pld	W	D	L	GF	GA	GD	Pts	Qualification
1	(Germany) SC Magdeburg	2	2	0	0	92	49	+43	4	Semifinals
2	(Saudi Arabia) Khaleej Club	2	1	0	1	76	60	+16	2	
3	(United States) California Eagles	2	0	0	2	46	105	−59	0	

Source: IHF
Rules for classification: 1) points; 2) head-to-head points; 3) head-to-head goal difference; 4) head-to-head number of goals scored; 5) goal difference.

27 September 2024; 15:00	California Eagles (United States)	25–48	(Saudi Arabia) Khaleej Club	New Capital Sports Hall, New Administrative Capital; Attendance: 700; Referees: Ismoilov, Ismoilov (UZB)
27 September 2024; 15:00	Damm 6	(16–22)	Al-Salem 11	New Capital Sports Hall, New Administrative Capital; Attendance: 700; Referees: Ismoilov, Ismoilov (UZB)
27 September 2024; 15:00	4× (suspension) 1× (red card)	Report	1× (yellow card) 3× (suspension)	New Capital Sports Hall, New Administrative Capital; Attendance: 700; Referees: Ismoilov, Ismoilov (UZB)

28 September 2024; 17:30	SC Magdeburg (Germany)	57–21	(United States) California Eagles	New Capital Sports Hall, New Administrative Capital; Attendance: 1,000; Referees: El-Saied, El-Saied (EGY)
28 September 2024; 17:30	Mertens 16	(28–14)	Vagset 7	New Capital Sports Hall, New Administrative Capital; Attendance: 1,000; Referees: El-Saied, El-Saied (EGY)
28 September 2024; 17:30	1× (suspension)	Report	1× (yellow card) 5× (suspension)	New Capital Sports Hall, New Administrative Capital; Attendance: 1,000; Referees: El-Saied, El-Saied (EGY)

29 September 2024; 15:00	Khaleej Club (Saudi Arabia)	28–35	(Germany) SC Magdeburg	New Capital Sports Hall, New Administrative Capital; Attendance: 350; Referees: Nachevski, Nikolov (MKD)
29 September 2024; 15:00	A. Al-Ibrahim 7	(14–15)	Persson 9	New Capital Sports Hall, New Administrative Capital; Attendance: 350; Referees: Nachevski, Nikolov (MKD)
29 September 2024; 15:00	3× (suspension)	Report	1× (yellow card) 4× (suspension)	New Capital Sports Hall, New Administrative Capital; Attendance: 350; Referees: Nachevski, Nikolov (MKD)

=== Second-placed teams ranking ===
Pos	Grp	Team	Pld	W	D	L	GF	GA	GD	Pts	Qualification
1	B	(Egypt) Al Ahly	2	1	0	1	72	46	+26	2	Semifinals
2	C	(Saudi Arabia) Khaleej Club	2	1	0	1	76	60	+16	2	
3	A	(Egypt) Zamalek SC	2	1	0	1	57	59	−2	2	

Source: IHF
Rules for classification: 1) points; 2) goal difference.

== Placement round ==
=== Standings ===
Pos	Team	Pld	W	D	L	GF	GA	GD	Pts
1	(Egypt) Zamalek SC	2	2	0	0	71	47	+24	4
2	(Saudi Arabia) Khaleej Club	2	2	0	0	76	54	+22	4
3	(Australia) Sydney Uni HC	2	1	0	1	62	77	−15	2
4	(Brazil) Handebol Taubaté	2	0	0	2	51	59	−8	0
5	(United States) California Eagles	2	0	0	2	53	76	−23	0

Source: IHF
Rules for classification: 1) points; 2) head-to-head points; 3) head-to-head goal difference; 4) head-to-head number of goals scored; 5) goal difference.

=== Results ===
1 October 2024; 11:00	Khaleej Club (Saudi Arabia)	29–27	(Brazil) Handebol Taubaté	New Capital Sports Hall, New Administrative Capital; Attendance: 250; Referees: Konjičanin, Konjičanin (BIH)
1 October 2024; 11:00	Moj. Al-Salem 7	(13–13)	Perin 6	New Capital Sports Hall, New Administrative Capital; Attendance: 250; Referees: Konjičanin, Konjičanin (BIH)
1 October 2024; 11:00	2× (suspension) 1× (red card)	Report	5× (suspension)	New Capital Sports Hall, New Administrative Capital; Attendance: 250; Referees: Konjičanin, Konjičanin (BIH)

1 October 2024; 14:00	California Eagles (United States)	23–41	(Egypt) Zamalek SC	New Capital Sports Hall, New Administrative Capital; Attendance: 100; Referees: Lemes, Sosa (URU)
1 October 2024; 14:00	Vagset 6	(11–21)	Saad 6	New Capital Sports Hall, New Administrative Capital; Attendance: 100; Referees: Lemes, Sosa (URU)
1 October 2024; 14:00	3× (suspension)	Report	3× (suspension)	New Capital Sports Hall, New Administrative Capital; Attendance: 100; Referees: Lemes, Sosa (URU)

2 October 2024; 16:00	Sydney Uni HC (Australia)	35–30	(United States) California Eagles	New Capital Sports Hall, New Administrative Capital; Attendance: 50; Referees: El-Saied, El-Saied (EGY)
2 October 2024; 16:00	three players 6	(18–15)	Raff 7	New Capital Sports Hall, New Administrative Capital; Attendance: 50; Referees: El-Saied, El-Saied (EGY)
2 October 2024; 16:00	1× (yellow card) 4× (suspension)	Report	4× (suspension)	New Capital Sports Hall, New Administrative Capital; Attendance: 50; Referees: El-Saied, El-Saied (EGY)

3 October 2024; 11:00	Khaleej Club (Saudi Arabia)	47–27	(Australia) Sydney Uni HC	New Capital Sports Hall, New Administrative Capital; Attendance: 150; Referees: Ismoilov, Ismoilov (UZB)
3 October 2024; 11:00	Al-Salem, Al-Sayyaf 11	(19–11)	Delpire 8	New Capital Sports Hall, New Administrative Capital; Attendance: 150; Referees: Ismoilov, Ismoilov (UZB)
3 October 2024; 11:00	1× (suspension)	Report	1× (suspension)	New Capital Sports Hall, New Administrative Capital; Attendance: 150; Referees: Ismoilov, Ismoilov (UZB)

3 October 2024; 14:00	Handebol Taubaté (Brazil)	24–30	(Egypt) Zamalek SC	New Capital Sports Hall, New Administrative Capital; Attendance: 150; Referees: Pavićević, Ražnatović (MNE)
3 October 2024; 14:00	Perin 7	(9–17)	Sadek 6	New Capital Sports Hall, New Administrative Capital; Attendance: 150; Referees: Pavićević, Ražnatović (MNE)
3 October 2024; 14:00	4× (suspension)	Report	2× (suspension)	New Capital Sports Hall, New Administrative Capital; Attendance: 150; Referees: Pavićević, Ražnatović (MNE)

== Knockout stage ==
=== Bracket ===
Semi-finals
1 October
(Germany) SC Magdeburg	28
(Egypt) Al Ahly	24
1 October
(Spain) Barcelona	34
(Hungary) Telekom Veszprém (ET)	39

Final
3 October
(Germany) SC Magdeburg	33
(Hungary) Telekom Veszprém (ET)	34
Third place
3 October
(Egypt) Al Ahly	32
(Spain) Barcelona	29

=== Semifinals ===
1 October 2024
17:00
Barcelona (Spain)
34–39 (ET)
(Hungary) Telekom Veszprém
New Capital Sports Hall, New Administrative Capital
Attendance: 500
Referees: Nachevski, Nikolov (MKD)
Gómez 10
(13–15)
Descat 9
1× (yellow card) 1× (suspension) 1× (red card)
Report
2× (yellow card) 3× (suspension)

FT: 29–29 ET: 5–10

1 October 2024; 20:00	SC Magdeburg (Germany)	28–24	(Egypt) Al Ahly	New Capital Sports Hall, New Administrative Capital; Attendance: 500; Referees: Gasmi, Gasmi (FRA)
1 October 2024; 20:00	Zehnder 9	(12–15)	Hassan 6	New Capital Sports Hall, New Administrative Capital; Attendance: 500; Referees: Gasmi, Gasmi (FRA)
1 October 2024; 20:00	3× (suspension)	Report	1× (yellow card) 7× (suspension)	New Capital Sports Hall, New Administrative Capital; Attendance: 500; Referees: Gasmi, Gasmi (FRA)

=== Third place game ===
3 October 2024; 17:00	Al Ahly (Egypt)	32–29	(Spain) Barcelona	New Capital Sports Hall, New Administrative Capital; Attendance: 3,000; Referees: Konjičanin, Konjičanin (BIH)
3 October 2024; 17:00	Ramadan 7	(18–15)	Janc 6	New Capital Sports Hall, New Administrative Capital; Attendance: 3,000; Referees: Konjičanin, Konjičanin (BIH)
3 October 2024; 17:00	4× (suspension)	Report	1× (suspension)	New Capital Sports Hall, New Administrative Capital; Attendance: 3,000; Referees: Konjičanin, Konjičanin (BIH)

=== Final ===
3 October 2024
20:00
SC Magdeburg (Germany)
33–34 (ET)
(Hungary) Telekom Veszprém
New Capital Sports Hall, New Administrative Capital
Attendance: 3,000
Referees: Hansen, Madsen (DEN)
Magnússon 7
(14–13)
Fabregas 9
2× (yellow card)
Report
1× (yellow card) 2× (suspension)

FT: 28–28 ET: 5–6

== Final ranking ==
Rank	Team
1st place, gold medalist(s)	(Hungary) Telekom Veszprém
2nd place, silver medalist(s)	(Germany) SC Magdeburg
3rd place, bronze medalist(s)	(Egypt) Al Ahly
4	(Spain) Barcelona
5	(Saudi Arabia) Khaleej Club
6	(Egypt) Zamalek SC
7	(Australia) Sydney Uni HC
8	(Brazil) Handebol Taubaté
9	(United States) California Eagles

== All-Star Team ==
The All-Star Team was announced on 12 November 2023.

Position	Player	Club
Goalkeeper	(Spain) Rodrigo Corrales	Veszprém KC
Right wing	(Spain) Aleix Gómez	FC Barcelona
Right back	(Iceland) Ómar Ingi Magnússon	SC Magdeburg
Centre back	(Croatia) Luka Cindrić	Veszprém KC
Left back	(Iceland) Gísli Þorgeir Kristjánsson	SC Magdeburg
Left wing	(France) Hugo Descat	Veszprém KC
Pivot	(Egypt) Ahmed Adel	Al Ahly
MVP	(France) Nedim Remili	Veszprém KC
