= Ahmed Mesilhy =

Egyptian handball player

Personal information
- Full name: Ahmed Adel Mesilhy
- Nationality: Egypt
- Born: 25 November 1994 (age 31)
- Height: 1.84 m (6 ft 0 in)

Sport
- Sport: Handball
- Club: Al Ahly
Medal record
Mediterranean Games
Silver medal – second place	2022 Oran	Team

Ahmed Adel Mesilhy (Arabic: احمد عادل مصيلحي; born 25 November 1994), known as Ahmed Adel (أحمد عادل), is an Egyptian handball player for Al Ahly and the Egyptian national team. He competed in the 2020 Summer Olympics.
