= Najat El-Khairy =

Canadian artist of Palestinian origin

Najat El-Khairy is a Canadian artist of Palestinian origin. As a collector and lecturer on Palestinian embroidery, she began painting Palestinian embroidery motifs on porcelain tiles with the hope of preserving Palestine's cultural legacy. Much of her work has been exhibited internationally, including at the United Nations headquarters in New York City.
