= Al Ahly (handball) =

Egyptian handball club

Al Ahly SC Handball
- Full name: Al Ahly Handball Club
- Nickname: Commandos
- Short name: AHL, ASC
- Founded: 1959
- Arena: Al Ahly Sports Hall
- Capacity: 2,500
- President: (Egypt) Mahmoud El Khatib
- Head coach: (Spain) David Davis
- Captain: (Egypt) Ibrahim El-Masry
- League: (Egypt) Egyptian Handball League
- 2025–26: Champion
Home	Away

Al Ahly Handball Club (Arabic: النادي الاهلي لكرة اليد) is one of Al Ahly Sporting Club's sections that represent the club in Egypt as well as in international handball competitions. Al Ahly Handball team was founded in 1959. The Al Ahly handball team has participated in the Egyptian Handball League since the beginning in 1960s until the present. The Championship was played under the name of the Republic League. The first championship win for the Al Ahly team in the Egyptian Handball League was in 1968 and 1969. The Al Ahly Handball Club has won the most titles in the league, 26 of which were gold medals. It participated in 8 different championships every season : The Egyptian Handball League, the Egyptian Handball cup, the Egyptian Handball Federation, the African Handball Champions League, the African Handball Cup Winners' Cup, the African Handball Super Cup, the Arab Handball Championship of Champions, and the Arab Handball Championship of Winners' Cup.

Al Ahly had the best record in the IHF Super Globe when it achieved a silver medal in 2007. For many years, Al Ahly preferred to participate in Arab tournaments instead of African tournaments, causing Al Ahly to remain at the top of Arab handball clubs with 8 total trophies. Al Ahly was the first team to qualify to the African Super Cup in 1994, but it withdrew its participation in Arab Championships.

Al Ahly has had many successful generations in handball, with the 1990s being particularly successful. During this period, they won six Egyptian Leagues, two Egypt Cups, two African Handball Champion Leagues, and six Arab Championships, in addition to contributing significantly to the Egypt men's national handball team.

Al Ahly player Gohar Nabil was nominated as the Best Handball Player in the World in 1998 and 2000. Further, Sameh Abdel Warth was chosen at the Handball World Team in 1997.

== Men's team honours ==
=== National titles ===
- Egyptian Handball League 27 (Record)
  - Champions : 1968–69, 1973–74, 1977–78, 1981–82, 1983–84, 1985–86, 1991–92, 1992–93, 1993–94, 1996–97, 1997–98, 1999–00, 2001–02, 2002–03, 2003–04, 2005–06, 2007–08, 2012–13, 2013–14, 2014–15, 2016–17, 2017–18, 2022–23, 2023–24, 2024–25, 2025–26
- Egyptian Handball Cup 12
  - Champions : 1995–96, 1997–98, 1999–00, 2004–05, 2008–09, 2013–14, 2018–19, 2019–20, 2020–21, 2022–23, 2024–25, 2025–26
- Egyptian Handball Super Cup 4 (Record Shared)
  - Champions : 2023, 2024, 2025, 2026
- Egyptian Federation Handball Cup 3 (Record)
  - Champions : 2015,"بالصور.. الأهلى يتوج بلقب كأس اتحاد اليد". 2016,2017
- 25 January Cup : (Played instead of cancelled league due to shortage time after 25 January Revolution and the champion qualify to African Handball Champions League)
  - Champions : 2011
- Egyptian Excellence Cup (Defunct)
  - Champions : 2003

=== International titles ===
- IHF Super Globe
  - Silver Runners-up : 2007 (Best African team record in IHF Super Globe)
  - Bronze Third place : 2024, 2026
- African Handball Champions League 9
  - Champions : 1985, 1993, 1994, 2012, 2016, 2023, 2024, 2025, 2026
  - Runners-up : 2013, 2014, 2018
- African Handball Cup Winners' Cup 5
  - Champions : 2013, 2017, 2018, 2021, 2025
  - Runners-up : 1985, 2001, 2014, 2015, 2019
- African Handball Super Cup 5
  - Champions : 2017, 2022, 2023, 2024, 2025
  - Runners-up : 2013, 2014, 2018, 2019, 2021

=== Regional titles ===
- Arab Handball Championship of Champions 5
  - Champions : 1993, 1994, 1995, 1998, 2010
  - Runners-up : 1986, 1999
- Arab Handball Championship of Winners' Cup 3 (Record Shared)
  - Champions : 1996, 1997, 2011
  - Runners-up : none

== Squad ==
Squad for the 2022–2023 season :

Goalkeepers

- 01 (Egypt) Abdelrahman Mohamed
- 16 (Egypt) Abdelrahman Taha
- 97 (Egypt) Mohammed Ibrahim

Right Wingers

- 19 (Egypt) Omar Sami
- 98 (Egypt) Omar Castilo

Left Wingers

- 11 (Egypt) Abdel Aziz Ehab
- 79 (Egypt) Mohamed Hesham
- 04 (Egypt) Islam Rady

Line players

- 24 (Egypt) Ibrahim El-Masry
- 72 (Egypt) Yasser Seif Eldin
- 80 (Egypt) Ahmed Adel
- 44 (Egypt) Omar Sherif

Left Backs

- 07 (Egypt) Mostafa Khalil
- 08 (Egypt) Shehab Abdallah
- 10 (Egypt) Abdelrahman Abdou

Central Backs

- 13 (Egypt) Seif Hany
- 17 (Egypt) Ahmed Khairy

Right Backs

- 05 (Egypt) Mohsen Ramadan
- 48 (Egypt) Mohab Saeed
- 55 (Egypt) Mohamed Lashin

== Transfers ==
- Transfers for the 2022–23 season

Joining

- (Brazil) Raul Nantes From (Romania) CS Dinamo București
- (Egypt) Ahmed Khairy From (Romania) CS Dinamo București
- (Egypt) Shehab Abdallah From (Egypt) Tala'ea El Gaish SC
- (Egypt) Mohammed Ibrahim From (Czech Republic) KH Kopřivnice

Leaving

- (Tunisia) Oussama Jaziri to ??
- (Egypt) Mahmoud Noaman to ??
- (Egypt) Omar Haggag to ??

Transfers for the 2020–21 season

Joining

- (Egypt) Mostafa Khalil From (Egypt) Zamalek SC
- (Egypt) Omar Haggag From (United Arab Emirates) Molayha

Leaving

- (Egypt) Mohamed El-Tayar to (Germany) DHfK Leipzig
- (Egypt) Mamdouh Taha to ??
- (Egypt) Baher Elbadrawy to ??
- (Egypt) Mohamed Gamal to (Egypt) Sporting
- (Egypt) Omar Yassin to ??

Transfers for the 2019–20 season

Joining

- (Egypt) Mohsen Ramadan From (Egypt) Heliopolis Sporting Club
- (Tunisia) Oussama Jaziri From (Tunisia) Espérance Sportive
- (Egypt) Mahmoud Noaman From (Egypt) Smouha SC
- (Egypt) Omar Yassin From (Qatar) Al Sadd SC
- (Egypt) Ahmed Sessa From (Egypt) Tala'ea El Gaish SC
- (Egypt) Omar Sami From (Egypt) Tala'ea El Gaish SC

Leaving

- (Egypt) Ahmed Khairey to (Romania) CSA Steaua București
- (Egypt) Fayez Naeem to (United Arab Emirates) Sharjah FC
- (Tunisia) Skander Zaïdi to (Tunisia) Espérance Sportive de Tunis
- (Tunisia) Youssef Maaraf to Espérance Sportive de Tunis
- (Egypt) Mahmoud Assem Hammad to (Egypt) Al Ahly Bank SC
- (Egypt) Abdelrahman Homayed to (Poland) Wisła Płock loan

Joining

- (Egypt) Mohamed Gamal from ElGazira SC
- (Egypt) Baher El Badrawy From Tala'ea El Gaish SC
- (Egypt) Ahmed Adel From Tala'ea El Gaish SC
- (Egypt) Abdel Aziz Ehab From (Egypt) Smouha SC
- (Tunisia) Skander Zaïdi From (Tunisia) Club Africain

Leaving

- (Egypt) Hady Refaat to (Egypt) Heliopolis Sporting Club
- (Egypt) Mostafa Khalil to (Egypt) Zamalek SC
- (Egypt) Ahmed Hossam to (Egypt) Zamalek SC
- (Egypt) Baggio to (Egypt) Al Ahly Bank SC
- (Egypt) Omar Elwakeel to (Egypt) Zamalek SC
- (Egypt) Mohamed Ibrahim to Alexandria Sporting Club
- (Egypt) Omar Hagag to (United Arab Emirates) mulaiha fc
- (Egypt) Ahmed Abd ElRahman (Egypt) Smouha SC
- (Egypt) Hady Hamido to (Egypt) El maadi fc

Transfers for the 2018–19 season

Joining

- (Egypt) Ahmed Khairey from ElGazira SC
- (Tunisia) Youssef Maaraf From El Makarem de Mahdia

Leaving

- (Egypt) (Qatar) Mahmoud Hassaballa to (Qatar) Al Ahli SC (Doha)
- (Egypt) Mohamed Abd Elwarth to (United Arab Emirates) Al Wahda FC
- (Egypt) Mohamed Amer Boody to (Egypt) Smouha SC
- (Egypt) ِAbd Alhamid Elsayed to (Egypt) Smouha SC
- (Egypt) ElSayed Mohamed to (Egypt) Smouha SC
- (Egypt) Mohamed Aktham to ??
- (Egypt) Ahmed Hesham to (Egypt) Smouha SC
- (Egypt) Aktham ElKhamisi to (Denmark) Nordsjælland Håndbold

Transfers for the 2017–18 season

Joining

- (Egypt) Mahmoud Hassaballa from El-Sadd (Qatar)
- (Egypt) Omar Haggag from ElShaab UAE
- (Egypt) Mohamed Aktham (back from loan)

Leaving

- (Egypt) karem El saeed Retire
- (Egypt) Baher ElBadrwey to (Egypt) ElGeish
- (Egypt) Mostafa Bisher (Saudi Arabia) Khaleej FC
- (Egypt) Mohamed Ali to (Egypt) Zamalek SC
- (Egypt) Khaled Essam to (Hungary) Ferencvárosi TC

Transfers for the 2016–17 season

Joining

- (Egypt) Islam Hassan
- (Egypt) Omar Yassin
- (Egypt) Hady Refaat
- (Egypt) Omar El Qualuobby (back from loan)

Leaving

- (Egypt) Mohamed Aktham
- (Egypt) Mohamed Abu Alatta
- (Egypt) Mohamed Ramadan Hitlr

== Technical and managerial staff ==
Name	Role	Nationality
David Davis	Head coach	(Spain) Spanish
Ahmed Salem	Assistant coach	Egyptian
Mohamed Ibrahim	Assistant coach	Egyptian
Yasser Labib	Team Manager	Egyptian
Mostafa naguib	Physiotherapist	Egyptian
Moahmed Elattar	Masseur	Egyptian
Venio Losert	Goalkeeper's Trainer	Croatian

== Recent titles ==
=== Egyptian league title ===
≥ Final round matches

Round	Team	Home	Away
1 & 6	(Egypt) Sporting	26–28	36–25
2 & 7	(Egypt) Smouha SC	27–21	32–22
3 & 8	(Egypt) Heliopolis SC	26–21	34–26
4 & 9	(Egypt) El Gaish	29–29(ET); 5–4(Pen)	27–24
5 & 10	(Egypt) Zamalek SC	21–18	17–18

≥ Final League Ranking

RNK	Team	PLD	W-L	(GF)	(GA)	(C)	(FRP)	(PRP)	(Tpts)
1st	(Egypt) Al Ahly SC	10	8-2	280	236	+44	26	3	29
2nd	(Egypt) Zamalek SC	10	8-2	278	267	+11	26	3	29
3rd	(Egypt) El Gaish	10	6-4	309	277	+23	20	2	22
4th	(Egypt) Sporting	10	5-5	272	268	+4	20	1	21
5th	(Egypt) Smouha SC	10	3-7	260	282	-22	16	1	17
6th	(Egypt) Heliopolis SC	10	1-9	267	336	-69	12	2	14

After the equal points of Al Ahly SC and Zamalek SC they played a tiebreak game when Al Ahly won 27–26, and were then announced as the Champion of Egyptian Handball league

=== The road to 2016 African Handball Champions League ===
#	Round	Team	Home
1	Group stage (Group A)	(Rwanda) Police HBC	43–20
2	Group stage (Group A)	(Republic of the Congo) AS Caïman	34-23
3	Group stage (Group A)	(Cameroon) Minuh Yaoundé	34–23
4	Group stage (Group A)	(Tunisia) Espérance de Tunis	29-24
5	Quarter Final	(Democratic Republic of the Congo) JS Kinshasa	31-20
6	Semifinal	(Morocco) Widad Smara	31-23
7	Final	(Tunisia) Espérance de Tunis	26-23

=== The road to 2018 African Handball Cup Winners' Cup ===
#	Round	Team	Home
1	Group stage (Group D)	(Cameroon) AS Minuh	28–15
2	Group stage (Group D)	(Libya) Al-Ittihad	28-20
3	Quarter Final	(Ivory Coast) Red Star	41-17
4	Semifinal	(Morocco) Widad Smara	37-19
7	Final	(Libya) Al-Ittihad	25-12

== Men's African competition records ==
Men's African Club Competitions
Year	African Handball Champions League	African Handball Cup Winners' Cup	African Handball Super Cup
1979	Did not enter "	started in 1985	Started in 1994
1980	Did not enter	started in 1985	Started in 1994
1981	Did not enter	started in 1985	Started in 1994
1982	Did not enter	started in 1985	Started in 1994
1983	Did not enter	started in 1985	Started in 1994
1984	Did not enter	started in 1985	Started in 1994
1985	Winner	started in 1985	Started in 1994
1986	Semi-finals	Runner-up	Started in 1994
1987	Did not enter	Did not enter	Started in 1994
1988	Did not enter	Did not enter	Started in 1994
1989	Did not enter	Semi-finals	Started in 1994
1990	Did not qualify"	Did not enter	Started in 1994
1991	Did not enter	Did not enter	Started in 1994
1992	Did not enter	Did not enter	Started in 1994
1993	Winner	Did not enter	Started in 1994
1994	Winner	Did not enter	Withdrew after qualifying
1995	Did not enter	Did not enter	Withdrew after qualifying
1996	Did not enter	Did not enter	Did not qualify
1997	Did not enter	Did not enter	Did not qualify
1998	Did not enter	Did not enter	Did not qualify
1999	Did not enter	Did not enter	Did not qualify
2000	Did not enter	Did not enter	Did not qualify
2001	Did not enter	Runner-up	Did not qualify
2002	Did not enter	Did not enter	Did not qualify
2003	Semi-finals	Did not enter	Did not qualify
2004	Did not enter	Did not enter	Did not qualify
2005	Did not enter	Did not enter	Did not qualify
2006	Did not enter	Did not enter	Did not qualify
2007	Did not enter	Did not enter	Did not qualify
2008	Did not enter	Did not enter	Did not qualify
2009	Did not enter	Did not enter	Did not qualify
2010	Did not enter	Quarter-finals	Did not qualify
2011	Quarter-finals	Did not enter	Did not qualify
2012	Winner	Did not enter	Did not qualify
2013	Runner-up	Winner	Runner-up
2014	Runner-up	Runner-up	Runner-up
2015	Quarter-finals	Runner-up	Did not qualify
2016	winner	Did not enter	Did not qualify
2017	Semi-finals	winner	winner
2018	Runner-up	winner	Runner-up
2019	Did not qualify	Runner up	Runner-up
2021	Canceled	winner	Runner up
2022	Semi-finals	Runner up	winner
2023	winner	Runner up	winner
2024	winner	Third place	winner
2025	winner	winner	winner

== The "Glory Season" ==
In the 2016/2017 season, Al Ahly HB had one of its best seasons when the team won five championships from six competitions competed.

- In the first months of the season, specifically in October 2017, Al Ahly won the 2016 African Handball Champions League in Burkina Faso after beat Espérance de Tunis in the final 26–23 achieving the fifth title in this tournament and the first title of this season.
- In the beginning of 2018 in January specifically Al Ahly crowned the Egyptian Federation Handball Cup after beat Al Gazira in the final and thus Al Ahly added his second title in this season.
- In the same month Al Ahly crowned a friendly championship of Alshaab club after the victory over the Algerian GS Pétroliers in the final 28–21, but this friendly championship is not calculated among the five trophies.
- In April 2018 the team won three trophies :
  - On April 12, in Agadir, Morocco Al Ahly won the 2017 African Handball Super Cup after beat Zamalek SC 29–23, this was the third title of Al Ahly in the season.
  - On April 22, Al Ahly won the 2017 African Handball Cup Winners' Cup after beat AS Hammamet in the final 31–22, this was the fourth title of this season.
  - On April 30, Al Ahly won the Egyptian Handball League after beating Sporting SC in the 24th round, Al Ahly had 24 wins in row (without any loss or a draw), this was the fifth title in this great season.

== Head coaches ==
This is a list of the senior team's head coaches in the recent years.

2025–présent	(Spain) David Davis
2024–2025	(Denmark) Stefan Madsen
10/2022–2024	(Spain) David Davis
4/2022–10/2022	(Spain) Daniel Gordo
2021–2022	(Egypt) Tarek Mahrous
2019–2020	(Sweden) Ola Lindgren
2019	(Slovenia) Niko Markovič
2016–2018	(Egypt) Assem Hammad
2014–2016	(Egypt) Tarik Mahrous
2012–2014	(Egypt) Assem Hammad
2010–2012	(Egypt) Mamdouh Seleman
2008–2010	(Egypt) Mohamed Abd moaty
2007–2008	(Serbia) Zoran Kurteš
2004–2007	(Egypt) Ashraf Shokry
2000–2004	(Egypt) Assem El Saadany
1998–2000	(Egypt) Assem Hammad
1993–1998	(Egypt) Gamal Shams
1991–1993	(Egypt) Mohamed Abd moaty
1990–1991	(Egypt) Khaled Khatab
1989–1990	(Egypt) Gamal Shams
1989	(Egypt) Mosaad Abbas
1985–1987	(Poland) Edward Strząbała
1984–1985	(Egypt) Gamal Shams
1982–1984	(Egypt) Talaat Sheta
	(Egypt) Fawzy Fadaaly
	(Egypt) Abdelaziz Tawfik
	(Egypt) ِKhalil Zaki
	(Egypt) Hassan Moustafa
	(Egypt) Kamal Abdel Hameed
	(Egypt) Mohamed Wahdan

== Al Ahly in Super Globe Championship ==
→ Al Ahly participate 4 times in IHF Super Globe. Al Ahly Hosted the IHF Super Globe 2007 In Al ahly hall in Gezira

=== 2007 IHF Super Globe ===
This competition was held in league format, and 5 teams took part. Al Ahly Fixtures was:

NO	Team 1	Result	Team 2
1	(Egypt) Ahly SC	35-13	(Kuwait) Al-Qadsiya
2	(Egypt) Ahly SC	26-23	(Brazil) Metodista SBC
3	(Egypt) Ahly SC	28-20	(Algeria) Mouloudia MCA
4	(Egypt) Ahly SC	28-29	(Spain) Ciudad Real

Final Ranking:

1st place, gold medalist(s)	(Spain) Ciudad Real
2nd place, silver medalist(s)	(Egypt) Al Ahly SC
3rd place, bronze medalist(s)	(Algeria) Mouloudia MCA
4	(Brazil) Metodista SBC
5	(Kuwait) Al-Qadsiya

=== 2015 IHF Super Globe ===
This competition was held in Knock out format starting form Quarter Finals, and 8 teams participated in this competition. Al Ahly Fixtures was:

NO	Team 1	Result	Team 2
Quarter Final	(Egypt) Ahly SC	16-20	(Spain) FC Barcelona Handbol
5–8th place	(Egypt) Ahly SC	20-17	(Tunisia) Club Africain
5-6th place	(Egypt) Ahly SC	28-24	(Brazil) HC Taubaté

- Final ranking

1st place, gold medalist(s)	(Germany) Füchse Berlin
2nd place, silver medalist(s)	(Hungary) MKB Veszprém
3rd place, bronze medalist(s)	(Spain) FC Barcelona
4	(Australia) Sydney University
5	(Egypt) Al Ahly
6	(Brazil) HC Taubaté
7	(Tunisia) Club Africain
8	(Qatar) Al Sadd

=== 2017 IHF Super Globe ===
Al Ahly Qualified to super globe after beat Zamalek SC in the 2017 African Handball Super Cup but later withdraw due to Political problems with Host Country Qatar. and Espérance participate instead of Al Ahly sc

=== 2022 IHF Men's Super Globe ===
Al Ahly Qualified to super globe after beat Zamalek SC in the 2022 African Handball Super Cup 32–31 The draw was held on 29 September 2022. and put Al Ahly beside both of (Portugal) SL Benfica and (Saudi Arabia) Mudhar Group B

Pos	Team	Pld	W	D	L	GF	GA	GD	Pts	Qualification
1	(Egypt) Al Ahly	2	2	0	0	65	58	+7	4	Semifinals
2	(Portugal) SL Benfica	2	1	0	1	67	56	+11	2	5–8th place semifinals
3	(Saudi Arabia) Mudhar	2	0	0	2	57	75	−18	0	9–12th place semifinals

Source: IHF
Rules for classification: 1) points; 2) head-to-head points; 3) head-to-head goal difference; 4) head-to-head number of goals scored; 5) goal difference.

18 October 2022; 19:45	Al Ahly (Egypt)	36–30	(Saudi Arabia) Mudhar	Dammam Sports Hall, Dammam; Attendance: 3,275; Referees: Madsen, García, Lee
18 October 2022; 19:45	Dahroug 9	(18–17)	Bannour 10	Dammam Sports Hall, Dammam; Attendance: 3,275; Referees: Madsen, García, Lee
18 October 2022; 19:45	5× (suspension) 1× (red card)	Report	1× (yellow card) 4× (suspension)	Dammam Sports Hall, Dammam; Attendance: 3,275; Referees: Madsen, García, Lee

20 October 2022; 16:45	Al Ahly (Egypt)	29–28	(Portugal) SL Benfica	Dammam Sports Hall, Dammam; Attendance: 2,100; Referees: Horáček, Novotný (CZE)
20 October 2022; 16:45	Khaled Hassan 8	(12–13)	Đorđić 9	Dammam Sports Hall, Dammam; Attendance: 2,100; Referees: Horáček, Novotný (CZE)
20 October 2022; 16:45	5× (suspension)	Report	1× (yellow card) 10× (suspension) 1× (red card)	Dammam Sports Hall, Dammam; Attendance: 2,100; Referees: Horáček, Novotný (CZE)

Championship bracket

Semi-finals
22 October
(Germany) SC Magdeburg	36
(Egypt) Al Ahly	28
22 October
(Poland) Łomża Industria Kielce	28
(Spain) Barcelona	39

Final
23 October
(Germany) SC Magdeburg (ET)	41
(Spain) Barcelona	39
Third place
23 October
(Egypt) Al Ahly	26
(Poland) Łomża Industria Kielce	35

Semifinals

22 October 2022; 18:00	SC Magdeburg (Germany)	36–28	(Egypt) Al Ahly	Dammam Sports Hall, Dammam; Attendance: 3,000; Referees: Lah, Sok (SLO)
22 October 2022; 18:00	Magnússon 8	(18–17)	Mahmoud 7	Dammam Sports Hall, Dammam; Attendance: 3,000; Referees: Lah, Sok (SLO)
22 October 2022; 18:00	2× (yellow card) 2× (suspension)	Report	2× (suspension) 1× (red card)	Dammam Sports Hall, Dammam; Attendance: 3,000; Referees: Lah, Sok (SLO)

Third place game

23 October 2022; 18:00	Al Ahly (Egypt)	26–35	(Poland) Łomża Industria Kielce	Dammam Sports Hall, Dammam; Attendance: 1,800; Referees: Schulze, Tönnies (GER)
23 October 2022; 18:00	Mesilhy 5	(13–16)	Tournat 8	Dammam Sports Hall, Dammam; Attendance: 1,800; Referees: Schulze, Tönnies (GER)
23 October 2022; 18:00	1× (suspension)	Report	4× (suspension)	Dammam Sports Hall, Dammam; Attendance: 1,800; Referees: Schulze, Tönnies (GER)

Final ranking

Rank	Team
1st place, gold medalist(s)	(Germany) SC Magdeburg
2nd place, silver medalist(s)	(Spain) Barcelona
3rd place, bronze medalist(s)	(Poland) Łomża Industria Kielce
4	(Egypt) Al Ahly
5	(Tunisia) Espérance de Tunis
6	(Saudi Arabia) Khaleej
7	(Portugal) SL Benfica
8	(Brazil) Handebol Taubaté
9	Al Kuwait
10	(Saudi Arabia) Mudhar
11	(Australia) Sydney University
12	(Mexico) Club Ministros

== Kit manufacturers and shirt sponsors ==
Period	Kit supplier	Shirt sponsors
2006-2009	(Germany) Puma	(United Kingdom) Vodafone / (Egypt) Juhayna / (United States) Chevrolet / (United States) Coca-Cola
2009-2011	(Germany) Adidas	(United Kingdom) Vodafone / (Egypt) Juhayna / (United States) Chevrolet / (United States) Coca-Cola
2011-2015	(Germany) Adidas	(United Arab Emirates) Etisalat / (Egypt) Juhayna / (United States) Chevrolet
2015-2017	(Italy) Diadora	(United Kingdom) Vodafone / (Egypt) Juhayna / (China) Huawei / (Egypt) Egyptian Steel / (United Kingdom) Shell Helix / (United States) Domino's
2017-2018	(Germany) Hummel	(United Kingdom) Vodafone / (Egypt) Juhayna / (China) Huawei / (Egypt) Egyptian Steel / (United Kingdom) Shell Helix / (United States) Domino's
2018-2019	(Germany) Hummel	(Egypt) TORNADO / (India) LAVA / (United Kingdom) Vodafone
2019-2020	(Spain) Kelme	(Egypt) WE / (Egypt) TIGER / (Egypt) GLC Paints / (United Kingdom) Shell Helix

== Notable players ==
- (Egypt) Hassan Moustafa
- (Egypt) Gamal Shams
- (Egypt) Mohamed El Alfey
- (Egypt) Yasser Labib
- (Egypt) Assem El Saadney
- (Egypt) Khaled El Awady
- (Egypt) Sameh Abdel Waress
- (Egypt) Ashraf Mabrouk Awaad
- (Egypt) Hazem Awaad
- (Egypt) Gohar Nabil
- (Egypt) Hany El-Fakharany
- (Egypt) Ashraf Shokrey
- (Egypt) Atef Abdelrahman
- (Egypt) Mahmoud Ashour
- (Egypt) Saber Heussin
- (Egypt) Ahmed Salem
- (Egypt) Mamdouh Seleman
- (Egypt) Tarek El Dorey
- (Egypt) Karim El Saaeed (N)
- (Egypt) Karim El Din Shoukry (N)
- (Egypt) Ayman El Alfey
- (Egypt) Eslam Issa

== Club presidents ==
No	Period	Name	From	To
1	1st	(England) Mitchel Ince	1907	1908
2	1st	(Egypt) Aziz Ezzat Pacha	1908	1916
3	1st	(Egypt) Abdelkhaleq Tharwat Pacha	1916	1924
4	1st	(Egypt) Gaafar Waly Pacha	1924	1940
5	1st	(Egypt) Mohamed Taher Pacha	1940	1941
6	2nd	(Egypt) Gaafar Waly Pacha	1941	1944
7	1st	(Egypt) Ahmed Hasanein Pacha	1944	1946
8	1st	(Egypt) Ahmed Aboud Pacha	1946	1961
9	1st	(Egypt) Salah Desouky Sheshtawy	1961	1965
10	1st	(Egypt) Abdelmohsen Kamel Mortagy	1965	1967
11	1st	(Egypt) Ibrahim El Wakil	1967	1972
12	2nd	(Egypt) Abdelmohsen Kamel Mortagy	1972	1980
13	1st	(Egypt) Saleh Selim	1980	1988
14	1st	(Egypt) Mohamed Abdou Saleh El Wahsh	1988	1992
15	2nd	(Egypt) Saleh Selim	1992	2002
16	1st	(Egypt) Hassan Hamdy	2002	2014
17	1st	(Egypt) Mahmoud Taher	2014	2017
18	1st	(Egypt) Mahmoud El Khatib	2017	Present

== See also ==
- Al Ahly FC
- Al Ahly FC Women
- Al Ahly (volleyball)
- Al Ahly Women's Volleyball
- Al Ahly (basketball)
- Al Ahly Women's Basketball
- Al Ahly Women's Handball
- Al Ahly (table tennis)
- Al Ahly (water polo)
- Port Said Stadium riot
- Al-Ahly TV
