= 2017 African Handball Super Cup =

Tournament details
- Host country: Morocco
- Venue(s): 1 (in 1 host city)
- Dates: 12 April 2017
- Teams: 4 (from 4 confederations)

Final positions
- Champions: (Egypt) Al Ahly SC (1st title) (Angola) 1º de Agosto (3rd title)
- Runner-up: (Egypt) Zamalek (Republic of the Congo) CARA Brazzaville

Tournament statistics
- Matches played: 2
- Goals scored: 122 (61 per match)

The 2017 African Handball Super Cup (23rd edition), also known as Babacar Fall Super Cup, in honour of the first chairman of the African Handball Confederation, was a handball competition organized by the African Handball Confederation, under the auspices of the International Handball Federation, the handball sport governing body. The matches, held on 12 April 2017 in Agadir, Morocco, were contested by Al Ahly SC, the 2016 African Handball Champions League winner and Zamalek, the 2016 African Handball Cup Winners' Cup winner, on the man's side and Clube Desportivo Primeiro de Agosto, the 2016 African Women's Handball Champions League winner and CARA Brazzaville in absence of TKC of Cameroon. Al Ahly SC, on the man's side and Primeiro de Agosto, on the woman's side, were the winners.

Al Ahly SC and Primeiro de Agosto qualified for the 2017 IHF Super Globe.

== 2017 Africa Men's Handball Super Cup ==
Wed, 12 Apr 2017; 18:00 WEST (UTC+1)	Al Ahly (Egypt)	29–23	(Egypt) Zamalek	Agadir, Morocco
Wed, 12 Apr 2017; 18:00 WEST (UTC+1)		(15–12)		Agadir, Morocco

== 2017 Africa Women's Handball Super Cup ==
Wed, 12 Apr 2017; 16:00 WEST (UTC+1)	1º de Agosto (Angola)	26–17	(Republic of the Congo) CARA Brazzaville	Agadir, Morocco
Wed, 12 Apr 2017; 16:00 WEST (UTC+1)		(14–09)		Agadir, Morocco

== Awards ==
2017 Africa Men's Handball Super Cup Winners	2017 Africa Women's Handball Super Cup Winners
Al Ahly Sport Club; 1st title	Clube Desportivo Primeiro de Agosto; 3rd title

== See also ==
- 2016 African Handball Champions League
- 2016 African Women's Handball Champions League
- 2016 African Handball Cup Winners' Cup
- 2016 African Women's Handball Cup Winners' Cup
