= 2007 IHF Super Globe =

Tournament details
- Host country: Egypt
- Venue(s): 1 (in 1 host city)
- Dates: 5 – 9 June 2007
- Teams: 5 (from 4 confederations)

Final positions
- Champions: (Spain) BM Ciudad Real (1st title)
- Runner-up: (Egypt) Al Ahly
- Third place: (Algeria) Mouloudia Club d'Alger
- Fourth place: (Brazil) Metodista São Bernardo

Tournament statistics
- Matches played: 10
- Goals scored: 529 (52.9 per match)

The 2007 IHF Super Globe was the third edition of the tournament. It was held in Cairo, Egypt at from 5 – 9 June 2007.

The tournament was played on round-robin format. BM Ciudad Real wins the title by defeating all the other opponents.

== Teams ==
(Algeria) Mouloudia Club d'Alger
(Brazil) Metodista São Bernardo
(Egypt) Al-Ahly Club Cairo
(Spain) BM Ciudad Real
(Kuwait) Al-Qadsiya

== Round-robin ==
Team	Pld	W	D	L	GF	GA	GD	Pts
(Spain) BM Ciudad Real	4	4	0	0	138	110	+28	8
(Egypt) Al-Ahly Club Cairo	4	3	0	1	117	85	+32	6
(Algeria) Mouloudia Club d'Alger	4	2	0	2	94	98	−4	4
(Brazil) Metodista São Bernardo	4	1	0	3	102	115	−13	2
(Kuwait) Al-Qadsiya	4	0	0	4	78	121	−43	0

== Match results ==
5 June 2007	Al-Qadsiya (Kuwait)	13 – 35	(Egypt) Al-Ahly Cairo	Cairo
5 June 2007		(4 – 18)		Cairo

5 June 2007	BM Ciudad Real (Spain)	43 – 33	(Brazil) Metodista São Bernardo	Cairo
5 June 2007		(21 – 20)		Cairo

6 June 2007	Metodista São Bernardo (Brazil)	23 – 26	(Egypt) Al-Ahly Cairo	Cairo
6 June 2007		(10 – 15)		Cairo

6 June 2007	MC d'Alger (Algeria)	26 – 29	(Spain) BM Ciudad Real	Cairo
6 June 2007		(12 – 18)		Cairo

7 June 2007	MC d'Alger (Algeria)	20 – 28	(Egypt) Al-Ahly Cairo	Cairo
7 June 2007		(9 – 13)		Cairo

7 June 2007	Metodista São Bernardo (Brazil)	25 – 22	(Kuwait) Al-Qadsiya	Cairo
7 June 2007		(12 – 10)		Cairo

8 June 2007	MC d'Alger (Algeria)	24 – 21	(Brazil) Metodista São Bernardo	Cairo
8 June 2007		(13 – 9)		Cairo

8 June 2007	BM Ciudad Real (Spain)	37 – 23	(Kuwait) Al-Qadsiya	Cairo
8 June 2007		(20 – 12)		Cairo

9 June 2007	Al-Qadsiya (Kuwait)	20 – 24	(Algeria) MC d'Alger	Cairo
9 June 2007		(9 – 12)		Cairo

9 June 2007	BM Ciudad Real (Spain)	29 – 28	(Egypt) Al-Ahly Cairo	Cairo
9 June 2007		(15 – 16)		Cairo

== Final ranking ==
1st place, gold medalist(s)	(Spain) BM Ciudad Real
2nd place, silver medalist(s)	(Egypt) Al-Ahly Club Cairo
3rd place, bronze medalist(s)	(Algeria) Mouloudia Club d'Alger
4	(Brazil) Metodista São Bernardo
5	(Kuwait) Al-Qadsiya
