= African Handball Super Cup =

International club handball competition

- Founded: 1994
- Country: Africa
- Confederation: CAHB members
- Most recent champion: (Egypt) Al Ahly (5 titles)
- Most titles: (Algeria) MC Alger (9 titles)
- 2026 African Handball Super Cup

African Handball Super Cup or Super Cup Babacar Fall is an annual international club handball competition run by the African Handball Confederation. It is between the winners of the Champions League and the Cup Winners' Cup.

== Finals ==
| Year | Host | Final | | | | | |
| Year | Host | Champion | Score | Runner-up | | | |
|---|---|---|---|---|---|---|---|
| 1994; Details | (Senegal) Dakar | (Algeria); MC Alger | 22–18 | (Senegal); Sélection de Dakar | | | |
| 1995; Details | (Republic of the Congo) Brazzaville | (Algeria); MC Alger | 24–19 | (Gabon); Petro sports | | | |
| 1996; Details | (Algeria) Algiers | (Algeria); MC Alger | 18–16 | (Algeria); MM Batna | | | |
| 1997; Details | (Nigeria) Kano | (Algeria); MC Alger | 26–17 | (Cameroon); FAP Yaoundé | | | |
| 1998; Details | (Niger) Niamey | (Algeria); MC Alger | 28–20 | (Cameroon); Minuh Yaoundé | | | |
| 1999; Details | (Benin) Cotonou | (Algeria); MC Alger | 22–15 | (Benin); Pélican Cotonou | | | |
| 2000 | — | Postponed | | | | | |
| 2001; Details | (Gabon) Libreville | (Cameroon); FAP Yaoundé | w/o | (Algeria); MC Alger | | | |
| 2002; Details | (Gabon) Libreville | (Egypt); Zamalek | 25–23 | (Tunisia); Club Africain | | | |
| 2003; Details | (Benin) Cotonou | (Angola); Primeiro de Agosto | 32–26 | (Cameroon); Minuh Yaoundé | | | |
| 2004; Details | (Tunisia) Tunis | (Algeria); MC Alger | 27–31 | (Tunisia); ES Tunis | | | |
| 2004; Details | (Algeria) Algiers | (Algeria); MC Alger | 19–14 | (Tunisia); ES Tunis | | | |
| 2005; Details | (Tunisia) Tunis | (Algeria); MC Alger | 33–27 | (Tunisia); Club Africain | | | |
| 2005; Details | (Algeria) Algiers | (Algeria); MC Alger | 23–22 | (Tunisia); Club Africain | | | |
| 2006; Details | (Algeria) Algiers | (Algeria); MC Alger | 20–16 | (Tunisia); Club Africain | | | |
| 2006; Details | (Tunisia) Tunis | (Algeria); MC Alger | 21–21 | (Tunisia); Club Africain | | | |
| 2007 | — | Postponed | | | | | |
| 2008 | — | Postponed | | | | | |
| 2009 | — | Postponed | | | | | |
| 2010; Details | (Burkina Faso) Ouagadougou | (Egypt); Zamalek | 28–27 | (Algeria); GS Pétroliers | | | |
| 2011; Details | (Cameroon) Yaounde | (Egypt); Zamalek | 25–21 | (Tunisia); ES Sahel | | | |
| 2012; Details | (Tunisia) Hammamet | (Egypt); Zamalek | 32–18 | (Cameroon); FAP Yaoundé | | | |
| 2013; Details | (Tunisia) Sousse | (Tunisia); ES Sahel | 28–25 | (Egypt); Al Ahly | | | |
| 2014; Details | (Republic of the Congo) Oyo | (Tunisia); ES Tunis | 21–20 | (Egypt); Al Ahly | | | |
| 2015; Details | (Gabon) Libreville | (Tunisia); Club Africain | 26–22 | (Tunisia); ES Tunis | | | |
| 2016; Details | (Western Sahara) Laayoune | (Tunisia); ES Tunis | 33–32 | (Egypt); Zamalek | | | |
| 2017; Details | (Morocco) Agadir | (Egypt); Al Ahly | 29–23 | (Egypt); Zamalek | | | |
| 2018; Details | (Egypt) Cairo | (Egypt); Zamalek | 21–20 | (Egypt); Al Ahly | | | |
| 2019; Details | (Morocco) Oujda | (Egypt); Zamalek | 38–35 | (Egypt); Al Ahly | | | |
| 2020 | (Angola) Luanda | Cancelled due to the COVID-19 pandemic | | | | | |
| 2021; Details | (Egypt) Cairo | (Egypt); Zamalek | 28–27 | (Egypt); Al Ahly | | | |
| 2022; Details | (Niger) Niamey | (Egypt); Al Ahly | 32–31 | (Egypt); Zamalek | | | |
| 2023; Details | (Egypt) Cairo | (Egypt); Al Ahly | 27–24 | (Egypt); Zamalek | | | |
| Year | Host | Final | | | Third place match | | |
| Year | Host | Champion | Score | Runner-up | Third place | Score | Fourth place |
| 2024; Details | (Algeria) Oran | (Egypt); Al Ahly | 23–21 | (Egypt); Zamalek | (Republic of the Congo); BMC | 38–21 | (Democratic Republic of the Congo); JS Kinshasa |
| 2025; Details | (Egypt) Cairo | (Egypt); Al Ahly | 24–15 | (Tunisia); ES Tunis | (Egypt); Zamalek | 41–20 | (Morocco); Montada Derb Sultan |
| 2026; Details | (Democratic Republic of the Congo) Kinshasa | | – | | | – | |

== Winners by club ==
| # | Clubs | Winners | Runners up | Total Finals |
|---|---|---|---|---|
| 1 | (Algeria) MC Alger | 9 | 2 | 11 |
| 2 | (Egypt) Zamalek S.C | 7 | 5 | 12 |
| 3 | (Egypt) Al Ahly SC | 5 | 5 | 10 |
| 4 | (Tunisia) ES Tunis H.C | 2 | 3 | 5 |
| 5 | (Tunisia) Club Africain | 1 | 3 | 4 |
| 6 | (Cameroon) FAP Yaoundé | 1 | 3 | 4 |
| 7 | (Tunisia) ÉS Sahel H.C | 1 | 1 | 2 |
| 8 | (Angola) Primeiro de Agosto | 1 | 0 | 1 |
| 9 | (Cameroon) Minuh Yaoundé | 0 | 2 | 2 |
| 10 | (Senegal) Dakar | 0 | 1 | 1 |
| 10 | (Gabon) Petro sports | 0 | 1 | 1 |
| 10 | (Algeria) MM Batna | 0 | 1 | 1 |
| Total | | 25 | 25 | 50 |

- Rq:

MC Alger (ex. GS Pétroliers)

== Winners by country ==
| # | Nation | Winners | Runners up | Total Finals |
|---|---|---|---|---|
| 1 | Egypt | 12 | 10 | 22 |
| 2 | Algeria | 9 | 3 | 12 |
| 3 | Tunisia | 4 | 7 | 11 |
| 4 | Cameroon | 1 | 5 | 6 |
| 5 | Angola | 1 | 0 | 1 |
| Total | | 25 | 25 | 50 |

== See also ==
- African Handball Champions League
- African Handball Cup Winners' Cup
