= Abla Khairy =

Egyptian swimmer

Abla Adel Khairy
- Born: Abla Adel Khairy; 1961 (age 63–64)
- Occupation: swimmer
- Parent: Inas Hakky Khairy

Abla Khairy (born 1961) is an Egyptian swimmer. At the age of 13, she became the youngest ever swimmer to cross the English Channel when she swam from England to France in August 1974. The previous youngest Channel swimmer was Leonore Modell. Abla's time was 12 hours and 30 minutes, which also beat Modell's mark by three hours. She repeated the crossing twice.

Abla's mother Inas Hakky Khairy was also a swimmer and made a failed attempt across the channel in her youth. Abla was awarded the Order of the Republic for Sports, First Class by President Anwar Sadat after her successful swim.
