= African Handball Champions League =

Handball competition

- Founded: 1979
- Country: Africa
- Confederation: CAHB members
- Most recent champion: (Egypt) Al Ahly SC (9th)
- Most titles: (Egypt) Zamalek SC (12 titles)
- 2026 African Handball Champions League

African Handball Champions League is an annual international club handball competition run by the African Handball Confederation. The top club sides from Africa's handball leagues are invited to participate in the tournament, which serves as a qualifying tournament for the IHF Super Globe.

== Summary ==
Year	Host	Final			Third place match		
Year	Host	Champion	Score	Second place	Third place	Score	Fourth place
1979; Details	(Egypt); Cairo	(Egypt); Zamalek SC	23–16	(Togo); ASFOSA	(Senegal); ASC Diaraf	–	
1980; Details	(Ivory Coast); Bouaké	(Egypt); Zamalek SC	20–19	(Algeria); DNC Alger		–	
1981; Details	(Senegal); Dakar	(Egypt); Zamalek SC	34–26	(Senegal); ASC Diaraf	(Egypt); Club of Shebeen for Spinning	–	
1982; Details	(Ivory Coast); Bouake	(Algeria); Nadit Alger	18–14	(Republic of the Congo); Inter Club Brazzaville		–	
1983; Details	(Republic of the Congo); Brazzaville	(Algeria); MP Alger	33–32 (ET)	(Republic of the Congo); Inter Club Brazzaville	(Algeria); Nadit Alger	–	(Angola); Primeiro de Agosto
1984; Details	(Senegal); Dakar	(Republic of the Congo); Inter Club Brazzaville	15–11	(Algeria); IRB Alger	(Egypt); Zamalek SC	–	(Nigeria); Niger United
1985; Details	(Morocco); Rabat	(Egypt); Al Ahly SC	18–18 (7–6 p)	(Algeria); MP Alger	(Ivory Coast); AS Biao	23–22	(Angola); Primeiro de Agosto
1986; Details	(Gabon); Libreville	(Egypt); Zamalek SC	19–17	(Republic of the Congo); Inter Club Brazzaville	(Angola); Primeiro de Agosto	31–22	(Egypt); Al Ahly SC
1987; Details	(Nigeria); Owerri	(Nigeria); IMO Lions	22–18	(Nigeria); Niger United	(Algeria); IR Binaa Alger	21–19	(Republic of the Congo); Inter Club Brazzaville
1988; Details	(Benin); Cotonou	(Nigeria); IMO Lions	27–24	(Cameroon); Rail HC	(Nigeria); Niger United	–	
1989; Details	(Ivory Coast); Abidjan / Bouake	(Ivory Coast); OMNESS Dabou	–	(Nigeria); Niger United	(Republic of the Congo); Munisport	–	
1990; Details	(Republic of the Congo); Brazzaville	(Egypt); Port Said SC	–	(Republic of the Congo); Avenir du Rail	(Republic of the Congo); Munisport	–	
1991; Details	(Nigeria); Kano	(Egypt); Zamalek SC	–	(Ivory Coast); RC Abidjan	(Nigeria); Kano Pyramids	–	
1992; Details	(Ivory Coast); Yamoussoukro	(Cameroon); FAP Yaoundé	–	(Ivory Coast); RC Abidjan	(Egypt); Zamalek SC	–	
1993; Details	(Tunisia); Tunis	(Egypt); Al Ahly SC	25–24	(Tunisia); Espérance de Tunis	(Angola); Primeiro de Agosto	–	(Tunisia); ÉS Sahel H.C
1994; Details	(Benin); Cotonou	(Egypt); Al Ahly SC	32–23	(Gabon); Petro Sport	(Nigeria); Niger United	–	
1995; Details	(Benin); Cotonou	(Algeria); MM Batna	24 – 14	(Cameroon); FAP Yaoundé	(Angola); Primeiro de Agosto	–	
1996; Details	(Benin); Cotonou	(Cameroon); FAP Yaoundé	–	(Nigeria); Sokota Rima	(Algeria); MM Batna	–	
1997; Details	(Niger); Niamey	(Algeria); MC Alger	30–16	(Cameroon); FAP Yaoundé	(Cameroon); Minuh Yaoundé	–	
1998; Details	(Benin); Cotonou	(Algeria); MC Alger	30–24	(Benin); Pelican Cotonou	(Cameroon); FAP Yaoundé	28–25	(Cameroon); Minuh Yaoundé
1999; Details	(Niger); Niamey	(Algeria); MC Alger	–	(Cameroon); FAP Yaoundé	(Cameroon); Minuh Yaoundé	–	
2000; Details	(Benin); Cotonou	(Algeria); MC Alger	–	(Nigeria); Kano Pyramids	(Republic of the Congo); Étoile du Congo	–	
2001; Details	Benin City	(Egypt); Zamalek SC	26–14	(Nigeria); Niger United	(Cameroon); Minuh Yaoundé	–	
2002; Details	(Gabon); Libreville	(Egypt); Zamalek SC	37–28	(Angola); Sporting de Luanda	(Senegal); ASC Diaraf	–	
2003; Details	(Benin); Cotonou	(Algeria); MC Alger	–	(Cameroon); Minuh Yaoundé	(Egypt); Al Ahly SC	–	
2004; Details	(Morocco); Casablanca	(Algeria); MC Alger	–	(Cameroon); Minuh Yaoundé	(Algeria); US Biskra	–	(Morocco); AS Casablanca
2005; Details	(Ivory Coast); Abidjan	(Algeria); MC Alger	23–22	(Tunisia); Espérance de Tunis	(Angola); Primeiro de Agosto	27–19	(Ivory Coast); Red Star OJA
2006; Details	(Ivory Coast); Abidjan	(Algeria); MC Alger	32–22	(Angola); GD da Banca	(Cameroon); Minuh Yaoundé	–	
2007; Details	(Benin); Cotonou	(Angola); Primeiro de Agosto	28–18	(Cameroon); Minuh Yaoundé	(Algeria); MC Alger	–	
2008; Details	(Morocco); Casablanca	(Algeria); MC Alger	22–20	(Morocco); AS Casablanca	(Cameroon); Minuh Yaoundé	–	(Angola); Primeiro de Agosto
2009; Details	(Cameroon); Yaoundé	(Algeria); MC Alger	27–22	(Cameroon); Minuh Yaoundé	(Angola); Primeiro de Agosto	34–30	(Republic of the Congo); Munisport
2010; Details	(Morocco); Casablanca	(Tunisia); ÉS Sahel H.C	26–22	(Algeria); MC Alger	(Algeria); JSE Skikda	35–30	(Morocco); AS Casablanca
2011; Details	(Nigeria); Kaduna	(Egypt); Zamalek SC	27–24	(Tunisia); ÉS Sahel H.C	(Angola); Primeiro de Agosto	26–20	(Algeria); JSE Skikda
2012; Details	(Morocco); Tangier	(Egypt); Al Ahly SC	21–17	(Egypt); Zamalek SC	(Tunisia); Espérance de Tunis	32–23	(Algeria); JSE Skikda
2013; Details	(Morocco); Marrakesh	(Tunisia); Espérance de Tunis	31–24	(Egypt); Al Ahly SC	(Tunisia); Club Africain	31–28	(Cameroon); FAP Yaoundé
2014; Details	(Tunisia); Tunis	(Tunisia); Club Africain	24–18	(Egypt); Al Ahly SC	(Tunisia); Espérance de Tunis	31–30	(Egypt); Alexandria Sporting Club
2015; Details	(Morocco); Nador	(Egypt); Zamalek SC	35–22	(Tunisia); Club Africain	(Egypt); Alexandria Sporting Club	24–23	(Tunisia); Espérance de Tunis
2016; Details	(Burkina Faso); Ouagadougou	(Egypt); Al Ahly SC	26–23	(Tunisia); Espérance de Tunis	(Egypt); Zamalek SC	30–24	(Morocco); Widad Smara
2017; Details	(Tunisia); Hammamet	(Egypt); Zamalek SC	31–29 (ET)	(Tunisia); Espérance de Tunis	(Egypt); Al Ahly SC	23–21	(Tunisia); AS Hammamet
2018; Details	(Ivory Coast); Abidjan	(Egypt); Zamalek SC	27–25	(Egypt); Al Ahly SC	(Algeria); MC Alger	33–31	(Democratic Republic of the Congo); JS Kinshasa
2019; Details	(Cape Verde); Praia	(Egypt); Zamalek SC	33–31 (ET)	(Egypt); Alexandria Sporting Club	(Angola); Interclube	24–21	(Democratic Republic of the Congo); JS Kinshasa
2020		Canceled due to COVID-19 pandemic					
2021		Canceled due to lack of host country					
2022; Details	(Tunisia); Hammamet	(Tunisia); Espérance de Tunis	28–24	(Egypt); Zamalek SC	(Egypt); Al Ahly SC	30–22	(Tunisia); Club Africain
2023; Details	(Republic of the Congo); Brazzaville	(Egypt); Al Ahly SC	37–27	(Democratic Republic of the Congo); JS Kinshasa	(Republic of the Congo); BMC	24–23	(Cameroon); FAP Yaoundé
2024; Details	(Morocco); Laayoune	(Egypt); Al Ahly SC	43–22	(Benin); Flowers SC	(Egypt); Zamalek SC	35–25	(Morocco); Montada Derb Sultan
2025; Details	(Morocco); Casablanca	(Egypt); Al Ahly SC	31–20	(Morocco); Montada Derb Sultan	(Ivory Coast); Red Star	24–21	(Cameroon); FAP Yaoundé
2026; Details	(Angola); Luanda	(Egypt); Al Ahly SC	26–25	(Egypt); Zamalek SC	(Democratic Republic of the Congo); JS Kinshasa	23–20	(Angola); Petro Atletico De Luanda

^1 A round-robin tournament determined the final standings.

== Winners by club ==
#	Clubs	Gold	Silver	Bronze	Total
1	(Egypt) Zamalek SC	12	3	4	19
2	(Algeria) MC Alger	11	2	2	15
3	(Egypt) Al Ahly SC	9	3	3	15
4	(Tunisia) Espérance de Tunis	2	4	2	8
5	(Cameroon) FAP Yaoundé	2	3	1	6
6	(Nigeria) IMO Lions	2	0	0	2
7	(Republic of the Congo) Inter Club	1	3	0	4
8	(Algeria) Nadit Alger	1	1	1	3
9	(Tunisia) Club Africain	1	1	1	3
10	(Tunisia) ÉS Sahel H.C	1	1	0	2
11	(Angola) Primeiro de Agosto	1	0	6	7
12	(Algeria) MM Batna	1	0	1	2
13	(Egypt) Port Said SC	1	0	0	1
14	(Ivory Coast) OMNESS Dabou	1	0	0	1
15	(Cameroon) Minuh Yaoundé	0	4	5	9
16	(Nigeria) Niger United	0	3	2	5
17	(Algeria) IRB Alger	0	2	1	3
18	(Ivory Coast) RC Abidjan	0	2	0	2
19	(Senegal) ASC Diaraf	0	1	2	3
20	(Nigeria) Kano Pyramids	0	1	1	2
21	(Egypt) Alexandria Sporting Club	0	1	1	2
22	(Morocco) AS Casablanca	0	1	0	1
23	(Togo) ASFOSA	0	1	0	1
24	(Republic of the Congo) Avenir du Rail	0	1	0	1
25	(Angola) GD da Banca	0	1	0	1
26	(Cameroon) Rail HC	0	1	0	1
27	(Benin) Pelican Cotonou	0	1	0	1
28	(Gabon) Petro Sport	0	1	0	1
29	(Nigeria) Sokota Rima	0	1	0	1
30	(Angola) Sporting de Luanda	0	1	0	1
31	(Morocco) Montada Derb Sultan	0	1	0	1
32	(Republic of the Congo) Munisport	0	0	2	2
33	(Egypt) Club of Shebeen for Spinning	0	0	1	1
34	(Ivory Coast) AS Biao	0	0	1	1
35	(Republic of the Congo) Étoile du Congo	0	0	1	1
36	(Algeria) JSE Skikda	0	0	1	1
37	(Algeria) US Biskra	0	0	1	1
38	(Angola) Interclube	0	0	1	1
Total		46	45	41	132

- Rq:

GS Pétroliers (ex. MC Alger & MP Alger)
OC Alger (ex. DNC Alger & IRB Alger)

== Winners by country ==
#	Nation	Winners	Runners-up	Thirds	Total
1	Egypt	22	7	9	35
2	Algeria	13	4	7	24
3	Tunisia	4	6	3	13
4	Cameroon	2	8	6	16
5	Nigeria	2	5	3	10
6	(Republic of the Congo) Congo	1	4	3	8
7	Angola	1	2	7	10
8	Ivory Coast	1	2	1	4

2nd & Third Placed Nations
#	Nation	Winners	Runners-up	Thirds	Total
9	Morocco	0	2	0	2
10	Senegal	0	1	2	3
11	Benin	0	1	0	1
11	Gabon	0	1	0	1
11	Togo	0	1	0	1
Total		45	45	43	133

== IHF Super Globe record ==
Pos	(Austria) 1997	(Qatar) 2002	(Egypt) 2007	(Qatar) 2010	(Qatar) 2011	(Qatar) 2012	(Qatar) 2013	(Qatar) 2014	(Qatar) 2015	(Qatar) 2016	(Qatar) 2017	(Qatar) 2018	(Saudi Arabia) 2019	(Saudi Arabia) ~~2020~~	(Saudi Arabia) 2021	(Saudi Arabia) 2022	(Saudi Arabia) 2023	(Egypt) 2024	(Egypt) 2025	(Egypt) 2026
1																				
2			(Egypt) AHLY																	
3			(Algeria) MCA	(Egypt) ZAM														(Egypt) AHLY		(Egypt) AHLY
4		(Cameroon) FAP			(Egypt) ZAM	(Egypt) ZAM	(Tunisia) ESS									(Egypt) AHLY			(Egypt) AHLY	(Egypt) ZAM
5								(Tunisia) EST	(Egypt) AHLY	(Tunisia) EST			(Egypt) ZAM		(Egypt) ZAM	(Tunisia) EST	(Egypt) AHLY		(Egypt) ZAM	
6											(Tunisia) EST	(Tunisia) HAM						(Egypt) ZAM		
7	(Algeria) MCA								(Tunisia) CA											
8	(Morocco) KACM																			(Morocco) MDS
Total	2	1	2	1	1	1	1	1	2	1	1	1	1	-	1	2	1	2	2	3

== See also ==
- African Handball Cup Winners' Cup
- African Handball Super Cup
- African Men's Handball Championship
