= 2017 IHF Super Globe =

Tournament details
- Host country: Qatar
- Venue: 1 (in 1 host city)
- Dates: 25–28 August
- Teams: 8 (from 5 confederations)

Final positions
- Champions: (Spain) Barcelona (3rd title)
- Runners-up: (Germany) Füchse Berlin
- Third place: (North Macedonia) RK Vardar
- Fourth place: (Qatar) Al Sadd

Tournament statistics
- Matches played: 12
- Goals scored: 700 (58.33 per match)
- Attendance: 10,600 (883 per match)
- Top scorers: (Iran) Mohammad Ghasemi (24 goals)

The 2017 IHF Super Globe was the eleventh edition of the tournament. It was held in Doha, Qatar at the Duhail Handball Sports Hall from 25 to 28 August 2017.

Barcelona captured their third title after a 29–25 final win over Berlin.

== Teams ==
The best club of each continent through their tournaments, a host team and a wild card team participated.

Team	Qualified as
(Germany) Füchse Berlin	Defending champion
(Tunisia) Espérance Sportive de Tunis	Runner-up of African Champions League
(Iran) Naft & Gaz Gachsaran	4th of Asian Club League Championship
(Australia) Sydney University	Winner of Oceania Champions Cup
(Brazil) EC Pinheiros	Winner of Pan American Club Championship
(North Macedonia) RK Vardar	Winner of EHF Champions League
(Spain) Barcelona	Wild card
(Qatar) Al Sadd	Host

== Referees ==
The following Referee pairs were selected for the tournament.

Referees
Argentina	Julian Grillo / Sebastián Lenci
Latvia	Renars Līcis / Zigmars Sondors
Norway	Kjersti Arntsen / Guro Røen
South Korea	Lee See-ok / Koo Bon-ok
Spain	Ignacio García / Andreu Marín
Tunisia	Ismail Boualloucha / Ramzi Khenissi

== Results ==
All times are local (UTC+3).

=== Bracket ===
Quarterfinals
25 August
(Qatar) Al Sadd	33
(Australia) Sydney University	25
25 August
(Germany) Füchse Berlin	33
(Brazil) EC Pinheiros	31
25 August
(North Macedonia) RK Vardar	30
(Iran) Naft & Gaz Gachsaran	22
25 August
(Spain) Barcelona	42
(Tunisia) Espérance Sportive de Tunis	24

Semifinals
26 August
(Qatar) Al Sadd	23
(Germany) Füchse Berlin	30
26 August
(North Macedonia) RK Vardar	29
(Spain) Barcelona	32

Final
28 August
(Germany) Füchse Berlin	25
(Spain) Barcelona	29
Third place
28 August
(Qatar) Al Sadd	19
(North Macedonia) RK Vardar	37

5th place bracket

5–8th place semifinals
26 August
(Australia) Sydney University	26
(Brazil) EC Pinheiros	32
26 August
(Iran) Naft & Gaz Gachsaran	28
(Tunisia) Espérance Sportive de Tunis	35

Fifth place
28 August
(Brazil) EC Pinheiros	32
(Tunisia) Espérance Sportive de Tunis	29
Seventh place
28 August
(Australia) Sydney University	24
(Iran) Naft & Gaz Gachsaran	27

=== Quarterfinals ===
25 August 2017; 13:00	Barcelona (Spain)	42–24	(Tunisia) Espérance Sportive de Tunis	Duhail Handball Sports Hall, Doha; Attendance: 1,500; Referees: Līcis, Sondors (LAT)
25 August 2017; 13:00	Gómez 9	(19–10)	Amri, Bhar 5	Duhail Handball Sports Hall, Doha; Attendance: 1,500; Referees: Līcis, Sondors (LAT)
25 August 2017; 13:00	3× (yellow card) 5× (suspension)	Report	1× (yellow card) 2× (suspension)	Duhail Handball Sports Hall, Doha; Attendance: 1,500; Referees: Līcis, Sondors (LAT)

25 August 2017; 15:00	RK Vardar (North Macedonia)	30–22	(Iran) Naft & Gaz Gachsaran	Duhail Handball Sports Hall, Doha; Attendance: 400; Referees: Boualloucha, Khenissi (TUN)
25 August 2017; 15:00	Borozan, Cindrić 5	(15–10)	Nosrati 7	Duhail Handball Sports Hall, Doha; Attendance: 400; Referees: Boualloucha, Khenissi (TUN)
25 August 2017; 15:00	3× (yellow card) 2× (suspension)	Report	3× (yellow card) 3× (suspension)	Duhail Handball Sports Hall, Doha; Attendance: 400; Referees: Boualloucha, Khenissi (TUN)

25 August 2017; 17:00	Füchse Berlin (Germany)	33–31	(Brazil) EC Pinheiros	Duhail Handball Sports Hall, Doha; Attendance: 800; Referees: García, Marín (ESP)
25 August 2017; 17:00	Nenadić 7	(16–14)	Flosi 8	Duhail Handball Sports Hall, Doha; Attendance: 800; Referees: García, Marín (ESP)
25 August 2017; 17:00	1× (yellow card) 1× (suspension)	Report	3× (yellow card) 5× (suspension)	Duhail Handball Sports Hall, Doha; Attendance: 800; Referees: García, Marín (ESP)

25 August 2017; 19:00	Al Sadd (Qatar)	33–25	(Australia) Sydney University	Duhail Handball Sports Hall, Doha; Attendance: 700; Referees: Koo, Lee (KOR)
25 August 2017; 19:00	Al-Karbi 7	(14–11)	Briffe 7	Duhail Handball Sports Hall, Doha; Attendance: 700; Referees: Koo, Lee (KOR)
25 August 2017; 19:00	4× (yellow card) 6× (suspension)	Report	2× (yellow card) 6× (suspension) 1× (red card)	Duhail Handball Sports Hall, Doha; Attendance: 700; Referees: Koo, Lee (KOR)

=== 5–8th place semifinals ===
26 August 2017; 13:00	Naft & Gaz Gachsaran (Iran)	28–35	(Tunisia) Espérance Sportive de Tunis	Duhail Handball Sports Hall, Doha; Attendance: 400; Referees: Koo, Lee (KOR)
26 August 2017; 13:00	Ghasemi 10	(12–16)	Boughanmi 9	Duhail Handball Sports Hall, Doha; Attendance: 400; Referees: Koo, Lee (KOR)
26 August 2017; 13:00	1× (yellow card) 4× (suspension)	Report	2× (yellow card) 3× (suspension)	Duhail Handball Sports Hall, Doha; Attendance: 400; Referees: Koo, Lee (KOR)

26 August 2017; 15:00	Sydney University (Australia)	26−32	(Brazil) EC Pinheiros	Duhail Handball Sports Hall, Doha; Attendance: 1,200; Referees: Arntsen, Røen (NOR)
26 August 2017; 15:00	Briffe 6	(11–16)	Hackbarth, Souto 9	Duhail Handball Sports Hall, Doha; Attendance: 1,200; Referees: Arntsen, Røen (NOR)
26 August 2017; 15:00	3× (yellow card) 5× (suspension)	Report	4× (yellow card) 5× (suspension)	Duhail Handball Sports Hall, Doha; Attendance: 1,200; Referees: Arntsen, Røen (NOR)

=== Semifinals ===
26 August 2017; 17:00	RK Vardar (North Macedonia)	29–32	(Spain) Barcelona	Duhail Handball Sports Hall, Doha; Attendance: 1,200; Referees: Grillo, Lenci (ARG)
26 August 2017; 17:00	Cindrić 7	(12–15)	Mem 6	Duhail Handball Sports Hall, Doha; Attendance: 1,200; Referees: Grillo, Lenci (ARG)
26 August 2017; 17:00	3× (yellow card) 2× (suspension)	Report	3× (yellow card) 4× (suspension)	Duhail Handball Sports Hall, Doha; Attendance: 1,200; Referees: Grillo, Lenci (ARG)

26 August 2017; 19:00	Al Sadd (Qatar)	23–30	(Germany) Füchse Berlin	Duhail Handball Sports Hall, Doha; Attendance: 2,000; Referees: Boualloucha, Khenissi (TUN)
26 August 2017; 19:00	three players 4	(13–16)	Lindberg 8	Duhail Handball Sports Hall, Doha; Attendance: 2,000; Referees: Boualloucha, Khenissi (TUN)
26 August 2017; 19:00	4× (yellow card) 3× (suspension)	Report	4× (yellow card) 5× (suspension)	Duhail Handball Sports Hall, Doha; Attendance: 2,000; Referees: Boualloucha, Khenissi (TUN)

=== Seventh place game ===
28 August 2017; 13:00	Sydney University (Australia)	24–27	(Iran) Naft & Gaz Gachsaran	Duhail Handball Sports Hall, Doha; Attendance: 600; Referees: Grillo, Lenci (ARG)
28 August 2017; 13:00	Hock 9	(12–13)	Ghasemi 10	Duhail Handball Sports Hall, Doha; Attendance: 600; Referees: Grillo, Lenci (ARG)
28 August 2017; 13:00	2× (yellow card) 7× (suspension)	Report	1× (yellow card) 5× (suspension)	Duhail Handball Sports Hall, Doha; Attendance: 600; Referees: Grillo, Lenci (ARG)

=== Fifth place game ===
28 August 2017; 15:00	EC Pinheiros (Brazil)	32–29	(Tunisia) Espérance Sportive de Tunis	Duhail Handball Sports Hall, Doha; Attendance: 300; Referees: Arntsen, Røen (NOR)
28 August 2017; 15:00	Hubner 8	(15–17)	Amri 8	Duhail Handball Sports Hall, Doha; Attendance: 300; Referees: Arntsen, Røen (NOR)
28 August 2017; 15:00	2× (yellow card) 3× (suspension)	Report	3× (yellow card) 4× (suspension) 1× (red card)	Duhail Handball Sports Hall, Doha; Attendance: 300; Referees: Arntsen, Røen (NOR)

=== Third place game ===
28 August 2017; 17:00	Al Sadd (Qatar)	19–37	(North Macedonia) RK Vardar	Duhail Handball Sports Hall, Doha; Referees: García, Marín (ESP)
28 August 2017; 17:00	three players 3	(10–14)	Shishkarev 8	Duhail Handball Sports Hall, Doha; Referees: García, Marín (ESP)
28 August 2017; 17:00	3× (yellow card) 5× (suspension)	Report	1× (yellow card) 4× (suspension)	Duhail Handball Sports Hall, Doha; Referees: García, Marín (ESP)

=== Final ===
28 August 2017; 19:00	Füchse Berlin (Germany)	25–29	(Spain) Barcelona	Duhail Handball Sports Hall, Doha; Attendance: 1,500; Referees: Līcis, Sondors (LAT)
28 August 2017; 19:00	three players 5	(12–15)	Rivera 9	Duhail Handball Sports Hall, Doha; Attendance: 1,500; Referees: Līcis, Sondors (LAT)
28 August 2017; 19:00	2× (yellow card) 8× (suspension) 2× (red card)	Report	2× (yellow card) 4× (suspension)	Duhail Handball Sports Hall, Doha; Attendance: 1,500; Referees: Līcis, Sondors (LAT)

== Final ranking ==
1st place, gold medalist(s)	(Spain) Barcelona
2nd place, silver medalist(s)	(Germany) Füchse Berlin
3rd place, bronze medalist(s)	(North Macedonia) RK Vardar
4	(Qatar) Al Sadd
5	(Brazil) EC Pinheiros
6	(Tunisia) Espérance Sportive de Tunis
7	(Iran) Naft & Gaz Gachsaran
8	(Australia) Sydney University
