= 2017 African Handball Cup Winners' Cup =

Tournament details
- Host country: Morocco
- Venue(s): 1 (in 1 host city)
- Dates: April 13–22, 2017
- Teams: 10 (from 1 confederation)

Final positions
- Champions: (Egypt) Al Ahly SC (2nd title)
- Runner-up: (Tunisia) AS Hammamet
- Third place: (Morocco) Widad Smara
- Fourth place: (Morocco) Raja d'Agadir

Tournament statistics
- Matches played: 23
- Goals scored: 1,562 (67.91 per match)

The 2017 African Handball Cup Winners' Cup was the 23rd edition, organized by the African Handball Confederation, under the auspices of the International Handball Federation, the handball sport governing body. The tournament was held from April 13–22, 2017 and took place at the Salle Omnisport Al Inbiâat, in Agadir, Morocco, contested by 10 teams and won by Al Ahly SC of Egypt.

== Draw ==
Group A	Group B
(Tunisia) AS Hammamet (Cameroon) FAP Yaoundé; Phoenix Gabon (Ivory Coast) Red Star (Morocco) Widad Smara	(Egypt) Al Ahly SC (Democratic Republic of the Congo) JS Kinshasa (Nigeria) Kano Pillars (Republic of the Congo) Patronage (Morocco) Raja d'Agadir

== Preliminary rounds ==
Times given below are in WEST UTC+1.

=== Group A ===
Thu, 13 Apr 2017
15:00	AS Hammamet (Tunisia)	0 (:) 10	(Cameroon) FAP Yaoundé
17:00	Widad Smara (Morocco)	23 (12:09) 20	(Ivory Coast) Red Star
Fri, 14 Apr 2017
16:00	Phoenix Gabon	29 (13:18) 31	(Tunisia) AS Hammamet
18:00	FAP Yaoundé (Cameroon)	19 (09:13) 28	(Morocco) Widad Smara
Sat, 15 Apr 2017
16:00	FAP Yaoundé (Cameroon)	17 (10:15) 26	Phoenix Gabon
18:00	AS Hammamet (Tunisia)	33 (15:10) 21	(Ivory Coast) Red Star
Sun, 16 Apr 2017
16:00	FAP Yaoundé (Cameroon)	17 (08:09) 19	(Ivory Coast) Red Star
20:00	Widad Smara (Morocco)	30 (:) 21	Phoenix Gabon
Tue, 18 Apr 2017
16:00	Red Star (Ivory Coast)	23 (13:11) 20	Phoenix Gabon
18:00	AS Hammamet (Tunisia)	35 (18:13) 28	(Morocco) Widad Smara

Team	Pld	W	D	L	GF	GA	GDIF	Pts
(Tunisia) AS Hammamet	4	3	0	1	99	88	+11	6
(Morocco) Widad Smara	4	3	0	1	109	95	+14	6
(Ivory Coast) Red Star	4	2	0	2	83	93	-10	4
Phoenix Gabon	4	1	0	3	96	101	-5	2
(Cameroon) FAP Yaoundé	4	0	0	4	63	73	-10	0

* Note: Advance to quarter-finals
Relegated to 9th classification

=== Group B ===
Thu, 13 Apr 2017
20:00	Raja d'Agadir (Morocco)	30 (14:10) 22	(Republic of the Congo) Patronage
20:00	Al Ahly SC (Egypt)	37 (:) 24	(Democratic Republic of the Congo) JS Kinshasa
Fri, 14 Apr 2017
20:00	Kano Pillars (Nigeria)	15 (13:14) 23	(Morocco) Raja d'Agadir
22:00	Patronage (Republic of the Congo)	24 (13:14) 31	(Egypt) Al Ahly SC
Sat, 15 Apr 2017
14:00	Patronage (Republic of the Congo)	25 (13:12) 24	(Nigeria) Kano Pillars
20:00	Raja d'Agadir (Morocco)	32 (19:07) 18	(Democratic Republic of the Congo) JS Kinshasa
Sun, 16 Apr 2017
14:00	Al Ahly SC (Egypt)	31 (15:08) 24	(Nigeria) Kano Pillars
18:00	JS Kinshasa (Morocco)	28 (14:11) 19	(Republic of the Congo) Patronage
Tue, 18 Apr 2017
16:00	Kano Pillars (Nigeria)	21 (09:09) 27	(Democratic Republic of the Congo) JS Kinshasa
20:00	Raja d'Agadir (Morocco)	27 (14:17) 28	(Egypt) Al Ahly SC

Team	Pld	W	D	L	GF	GA	GDIF	Pts
(Egypt) Al Ahly SC	4	4	0	0	127	99	+28	8
(Morocco) Raja d'Agadir	4	3	0	1	112	83	+29	6
(Democratic Republic of the Congo) JS Kinshasa	4	2	0	2	97	109	-12	4
(Republic of the Congo) Patronage	4	1	0	3	90	113	-23	2
(Nigeria) Kano Pillars	4	0	0	4	84	106	-22	0

* Note: Advance to quarter-finals
Relegated to 9th classification

== Knockout stage ==
Championship bracket

Quarter-finals
Wed 19 Apr 2017 – 16:00
(Egypt) Al Ahly SC	25
(Cameroon) FAP Yaoundé	19
Wed 19 Apr 2017 –
(Morocco) Widad Smara	32
(Democratic Republic of the Congo) JS Kinshasa	25
Wed 19 Apr 2017 – 14:00
(Tunisia) AS Hammamet	37
(Republic of the Congo) Patronage	25
Wed 19 Apr 2017 –
(Morocco) Raja d'Agadir	24
(Democratic Republic of the Congo) Red Star	18

Semi-finals
Thu 20 Apr 2017 – 18:00
(Morocco) Widad Smara	18
(Egypt) Al Ahly SC	33
Thu 20 Apr 2017 –
(Tunisia) AS Hammamet	26
(Morocco) Raja d'Agadir	17

Final
Sat 22 Apr 2017 – 18:30
(Egypt) Al Ahly SC	31
(Tunisia) AS Hammamet	22
Third place
Sat 22 Apr 2017 – 16:30
(Morocco) Widad Smara	26
(Morocco) Raja d'Agadir	20

5-8th bracket

5th-8th place
Thu 20 Apr 2017 – 14:00
(Ivory Coast) Red Star	27
(Republic of the Congo) Patronage	23
Thu 20 Apr 2017 –
(Cameroon) FAP Yaoundé	19
(Democratic Republic of the Congo) JS Kinshasa	29

Fifth place
Sat 22 Apr 2017 – 10:00
(Ivory Coast) Red Star	24
(Democratic Republic of the Congo) JS Kinshasa	27
Seventh place
Fri 13 May 2016 – 14:00
(Cameroon) FAP Yaoundé	0
(Republic of the Congo) Patronage	20

9th place

Semi-finals

Ninth place
Thu 20 Apr 2017 – 10:00
Phoenix Gabon	20
(Nigeria) Kano Pillars	15
Third place

== Final standings ==
Rank	Team	Record
Gold medal	(Egypt) Al Ahly SC	7–0
Silver medal	(Tunisia) AS Hammamet	5–2
Bronze medal	(Morocco) Widad Smara	5–2
4	(Morocco) Raja d'Agadir	4–3
5	(Democratic Republic of the Congo) JS Kinshasa	4–3
6	(Ivory Coast) Red Star	3–4
7	(Republic of the Congo) Patronage	2–5
8	(Cameroon) FAP Yaoundé	0–7
9	Phoenix Gabon	2–3
10	(Nigeria) Kano Pillars	0–5

== Awards ==
2017 African Handball Cup Winners' Cup Winner

Al Ahly Sport Club
2nd title

Best Player

== See also ==
2017 African Handball Champions League
