= 2016 African Handball Champions League =

Handball tournament edition

Tournament details
- Host country: Burkina Faso
- Venue: 1 (in 1 host city)
- Dates: October 21–30
- Teams: 10 (from 1 confederation)

Final positions
- Champions: (Egypt) Al Ahly (5th title)
- Runners-up: (Tunisia) Espérance Tunis
- Third place: (Egypt) Zamalek
- Fourth place: (Morocco) Widad Smara

Tournament statistics
- Matches played: 39
- Goals scored: 2,152 (55.18 per match)

The 2016 African Handball Champions League was the 38th edition, organized by the African Handball Confederation, under the auspices of the International Handball Federation, the handball sport governing body. The tournament was held from October 21–30, 2016 at the Palais de Sports de Ouagadougou in Burkina Faso, contested by 10 teams and won by Al Ahly of Egypt.

Al Ahly qualified to the 2017 IHF Super Globe.

== Draw ==
Group A	Group B
(Egypt) Al Ahly (Republic of the Congo) AS Caïman (Tunisia) Espérance de Tunis (Cameroon) Minuh Yaoundé (Rwanda) Police HBC	(Burkina Faso) AS Douane (Cameroon) FAP Yaoundé (Democratic Republic of the Congo) JS Kinshasa (Ivory Coast) Red Star (Morocco) Widad Smara (Egypt) Zamalek

== Preliminary rounds ==
Times given below are in GMT UTC+0.

=== Group A ===
Fri, 21 Oct 2016
Al Ahly (Egypt)	43 (20:10) 20	(Rwanda) Police HBC
Espérance (Tunisia)	37 (17:11) 21	(Republic of the Congo) AS Caïman
Sat, 22 Oct 2016
Police HBC (Rwanda)	33 (18:18) 36	(Republic of the Congo) AS Caïman
Minuh Yaoundé (Cameroon)	32 (13:23) 47	(Tunisia) Espérance
Sun, 23 Oct 2016
AS Caïman (Republic of the Congo)	23 (11:20) 34	(Egypt) Al Ahly
Minuh Yaoundé (Cameroon)	44 (24:09) 24	(Rwanda) Police HBC
Mon, 24 Oct 2016
Police HBC (Rwanda)	20 (07:18) 43	(Tunisia) Espérance
Al Ahly (Egypt)	34 (15:12) 23	(Cameroon) Minuh Yaoundé
Tue, 25 Oct 2016
AS Caïman (Republic of the Congo)	27 (14:10) 21	(Cameroon) Minuh Yaoundé
Espérance (Tunisia)	24 (08:14) 29	(Egypt) Al Ahly

Team	Pld	W	D	L	GF	GA	GDIF	Pts
(Egypt) Al Ahly	4	4	0	0	140	90	+50	8
(Tunisia) Espérance	4	3	0	1	151	102	+49	6
(Republic of the Congo) AS Caïman	4	2	0	2	107	125	-18	4
(Cameroon) Minuh Yaoundé	4	1	0	3	120	132	-12	2
(Rwanda) Police HBC	4	0	0	4	97	166	-69	0

- Note: Advance to quarter-finals
  Relegated to 9th place classification

=== Group B ===
Fri, 21 Oct 2016
Widad Smara (Morocco)	20 (-:-) 0	(Ivory Coast) Red Star
Zamalek (Egypt)	30 (16:09) 23	(Cameroon) FAP Yaoundé
AS Douane (Burkina Faso)	21 (10:13) 35	(Democratic Republic of the Congo) JS Kinshasa
Sat, 22 Oct 2016
Widad Smara (Morocco)	26 (-:-) 25	(Cameroon) JS Kinshasa
FAP Yaoundé (Cameroon)	30 (13:13) 21	(Burkina Faso) AS Douane
Zamalek (Egypt)	38 (18:12) 24	(Ivory Coast) Red Star
Sun, 23 Oct 2016
Red Star (Ivory Coast)	21 (11:10) 24	(Cameroon) FAP Yaoundé
Widad Smara (Morocco)	33 (-:-) 24	(Burkina Faso) AS Douane
JS Kinshasa (Democratic Republic of the Congo)	24 (-:-) 35	(Egypt) Zamalek
Mon, 24 Oct 2016
JS Kinshasa (Democratic Republic of the Congo)	25 (10:19) 20	(Ivory Coast) Red Star
FAP Yaoundé (Cameroon)	23 (10:15) 24	(Morocco) Widad Smara
AS Douane (Burkina Faso)	21 (08:19) 34	(Egypt) Zamalek
Tue, 25 Oct 2016
Zamalek (Egypt)	35 (18:14) 26	(Morocco) Widad Smara
Red Star (Ivory Coast)	37 (18:09) 18	(Burkina Faso) AS Douane
FAP Yaoundé (Cameroon)	22 (14:08) 19	(Democratic Republic of the Congo) JS Kinshasa

Team	Pld	W	D	L	GF	GA	GDIF	Pts
(Egypt) Zamalek	5	5	0	0	172	118	+54	10
(Morocco) Widad Smara	5	4	0	1	129	107	+22	8
(Cameroon) FAP Yaoundé	5	3	0	2	122	115	+7	6
(Democratic Republic of the Congo) JS Kinshasa	5	2	0	3	128	124	+4	4
(Ivory Coast) Red Star	5	1	0	4	102	125	-23	2
(Burkina Faso) AS Douane	5	0	0	5	105	169	-64	2

- Note: Advance to quarter-finals
  Relegated to 9th place classification

== Knockout stage ==
Championship bracket

Quarter-finals
Thu 27 Oct 2016 – 13:00
(Egypt) Al Ahly	31
(Democratic Republic of the Congo) JS Kinshasa	20
Thu 27 Oct 2016 – 14:45
(Morocco) Widad Smara	28
(Republic of the Congo) AS Caïman	26
Thu 27 Oct 2016 – 20:00
(Tunisia) Espérance Tunis	33
(Cameroon) FAP Yaoundé	20
Thu 27 Oct 2016 – 21:45
(Egypt) Zamalek	41
(Cameroon) Minuh Yaoundé	25

Semi-finals
Fri 28 Oct 2016 – 16:45
(Egypt) Al Ahly	31
(Morocco) Widad Smara	23
Fri 28 Oct 2016 – 20:15
(Tunisia) Espérance Tunis	23
(Egypt) Zamalek	19

Final
Sun 30 Oct 2016 – :
(Egypt) Al Ahly	26
(Tunisia) Espérance Tunis	23
Third place
Sat 29 Oct 2016 – :
(Egypt) Zamalek	30
(Morocco) Widad Smara	24

5-8th bracket

5–8th place
Fri 28 Oct 2016 – 13:15
(Cameroon) FAP Yaoundé	34
(Cameroon) Minuh Yaoundé	30
Fri 28 Oct 2016 – 09:45
(Republic of the Congo) AS Caïman	28
(Democratic Republic of the Congo) JS Kinshasa	25

Fifth place
Sat 29 Oct 2016 – 14:45
(Cameroon) FAP Yaoundé	30
(Republic of the Congo) AS Caïman	28
Seventh place
Sat 29 Oct 2016 – 11:15
(Democratic Republic of the Congo) JS Kinshasa	39
(Cameroon) Minuh Yaoundé	26

9th place

Semi-finals
Thu 27 Oct 2016 – 08:00
(Burkina Faso) AS Douane	34
(Rwanda) Police HBC	32

Ninth place
Sat 29 Oct 2016 – 08:00
(Ivory Coast) Red Star	33
(Rwanda) Police HBC	17
Third place

== Final standings ==
Rank	Team	Record
Gold medal	(Egypt) Al Ahly	7–0
Silver medal	(Tunisia) Espérance Tunis	5–2
Bronze medal	(Egypt) Zamalek	7–1
4	(Morocco) Widad Smara	5–3
5	(Cameroon) FAP Yaoundé	5–3
6	(Republic of the Congo) AS Caïman	3–4
7	(Democratic Republic of the Congo) JS Kinshasa	3–5
8	(Cameroon) Minuh Yaoundé	1–6
9	(Ivory Coast) Red Star	2–4
10	(Burkina Faso) AS Douane	1–5
11	(Rwanda) Police HBC	0–6

Qualified to the 2017 IHF Super Globe

== Awards ==
2016 African Handball Champions League Winner

Al Ahly Sport Club
5th title

Best Player

== See also ==
- 2016 African Handball Cup Winners' Cup
