= Hamadi Bousbiaâ =

Tunisian businessman (died 2022)

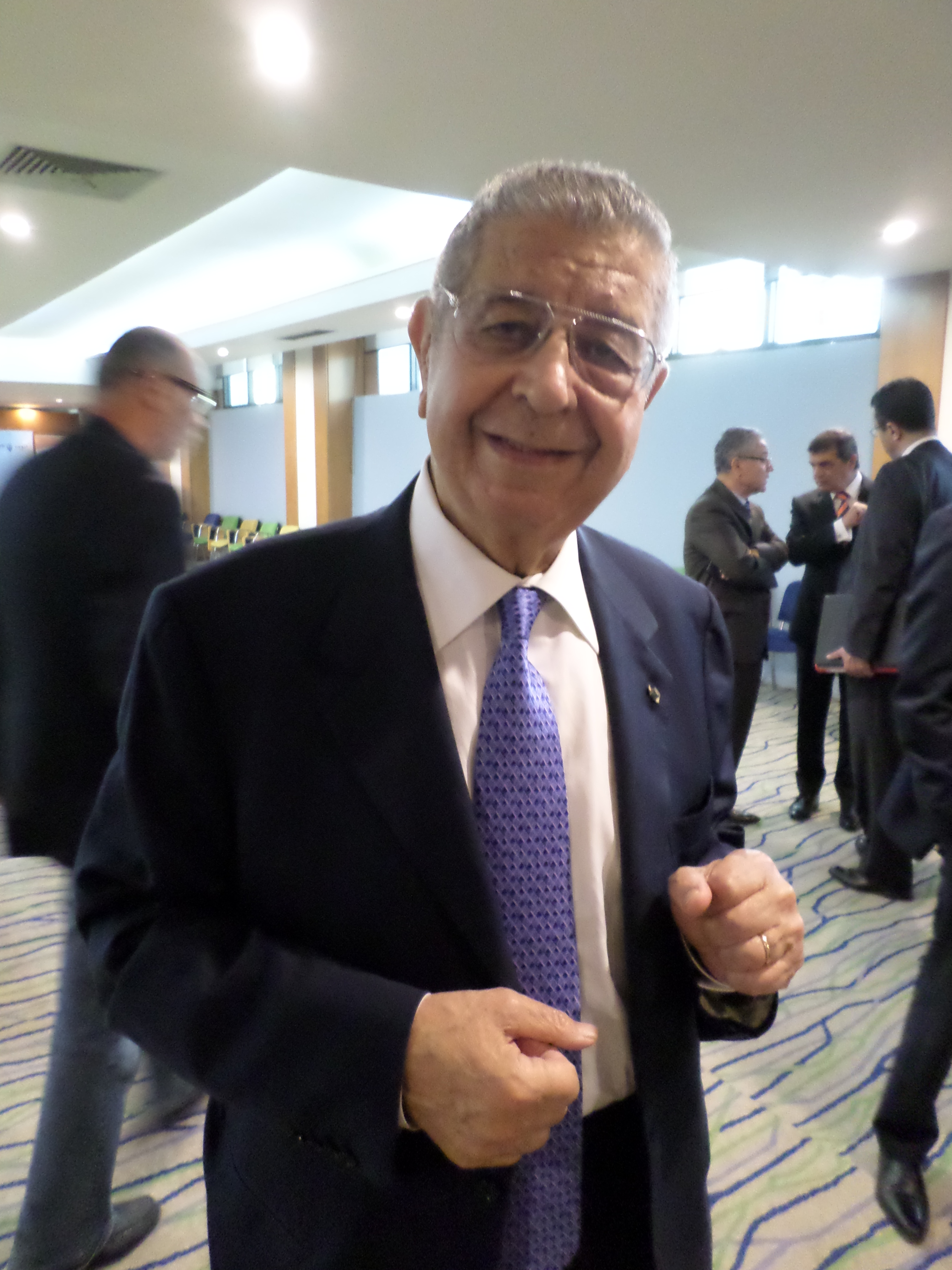
- Bousbiaâ in 2016
- Born: 1934; Tunis, Tunisia
- Died: 4 December 2022 (aged 87–88)
- Education: Sadiki College
- Occupation: Businessman

Hamadi Bousbiaâ (Arabic: حمادي بوصبيع; died 4 December 2022) was a Tunisian businessman and football personality.

== Biography ==
Bousbiaâ served as director-general of the Société de fabrication des boissons de Tunisie. He was president of the Club africain from 1988 to 1989 and again from 1993 to 1994. During his mandates, the omnisport club was champion of the Tunisian Handball League, the Tunisian Women's Handball League twice, the Tunisian Handball Cup, Tunisian Women's Handball Cup, the Tunisian Men's Volleyball League, Tunisian Women's Volleyball League, Tunisian Women's Volleyball Cup, the Women's African Volleyball Clubs Championship, and the Arab Volleyball Clubs Championship.

Hamadi Bousbiaâ died on 4 December 2022.
