= 2015 African Handball Super Cup =

Tournament details
- Host country: Gabon
- Venue(s): 1 (in 1 host city)
- Dates: 12 May 2015
- Teams: 4 (from 2 confederations)

Final positions
- Champions: (Tunisia) Club Africain (1st title) (Angola) 1º de Agosto (1st title)
- Runner-up: (Tunisia) ES Tunis (Angola) Petro Atlético

Tournament statistics
- Matches played: 1
- Goals scored: 60 (60 per match)

The 2015 African Women's Handball Super Cup (21st edition), also known as Babacar Fall Super Cup, in honour of the first chairman of the African Handball Confederation, was a handball competition organized by the African Handball Confederation, under the auspices of the International Handball Federation, the handball sport governing body. The matches, held on 12 May 2015 in Libreville, Gabon, were contested by Club Africain, the 2014 African Handball Champions League winner and Espérance Sportive de Tunis, the 2014 African Handball Cup Winners' Cup winner, on the man's side and Clube Desportivo Primeiro de Agosto, the 2014 African Women's Handball Champions League winner and Petro Atlético, the 2014 African Women's Handball Cup Winners' Cup winner, on the woman's side. Clube Africain and Primeiro de Agosto were the winners, the woman's match being the first ever final contested by teams from the same country.

Club Africain qualified to the 2015 IHF Super Globe.

== 2015 Africa Men's Handball Super Cup ==
Tue, 12 May 2015; 18:00 WAT (UTC+1)	Club Africain (Tunisia)	26–22	(Tunisia) ES Tunis	Libreville, Gabon
Tue, 12 May 2015; 18:00 WAT (UTC+1)		(12–06)		Libreville, Gabon

== 2015 Africa Women's Handball Super Cup ==
Tue, 12 May 2015; 16:00 WAT (UTC+1)	1º de Agosto (Angola)	32–28	(Angola) Petro Atlético	Libreville, Gabon
Tue, 12 May 2015; 16:00 WAT (UTC+1)		(17–17)		Libreville, Gabon

== Awards ==
2015 Africa Men's Handball Super Cup Winner	2015 Africa Women's Handball Super Cup Winner
Club Africain; 1st title	Clube Desportivo Primeiro de Agosto; 1st title

== See also ==
- 2014 African Handball Champions League
- 2014 African Women's Handball Champions League
- 2014 African Handball Cup Winners' Cup
- 2014 African Women's Handball Cup Winners' Cup
