= Oussama Boughanmi (handballer) =

Tunisian handball player (born 1990)

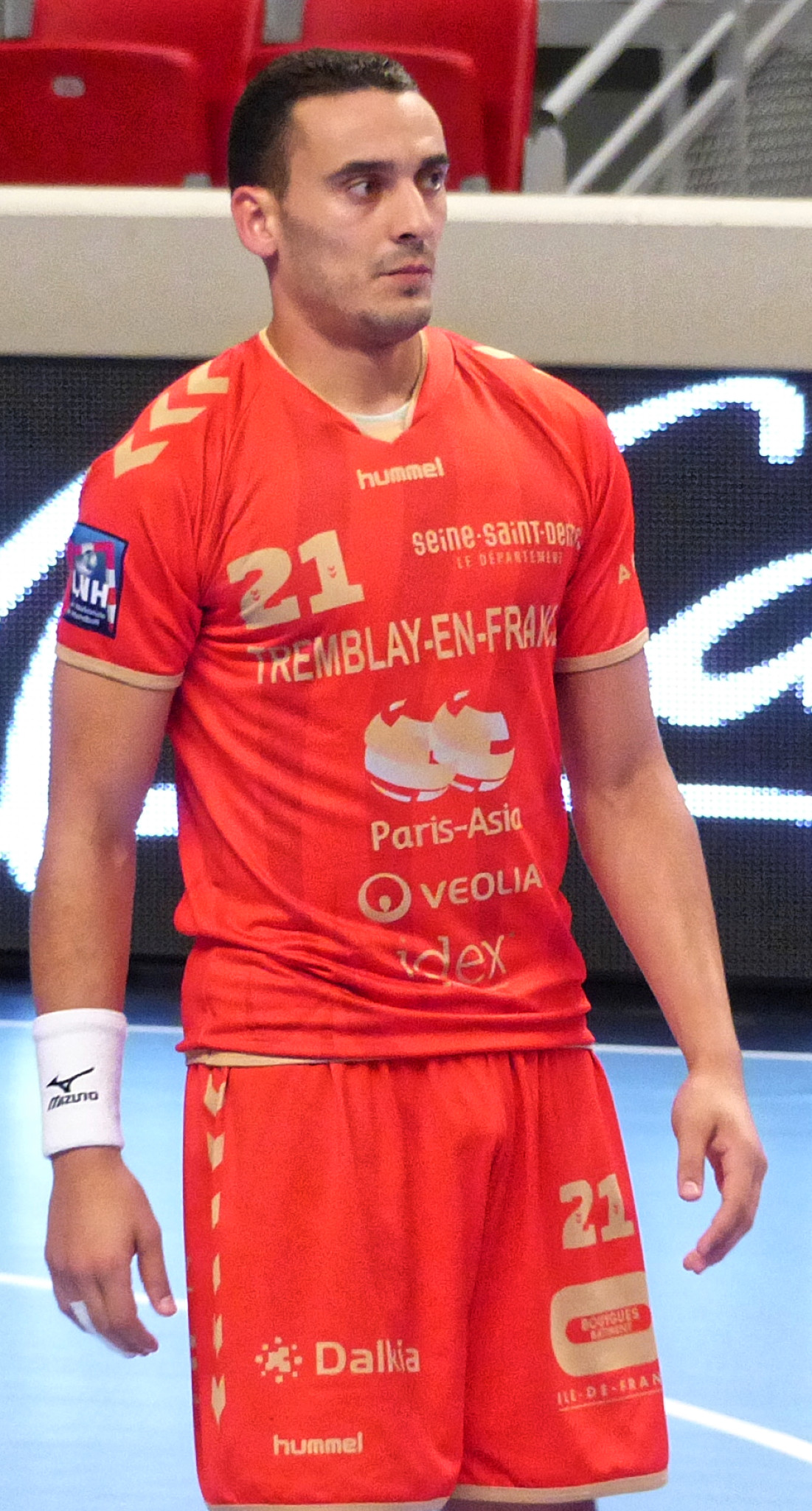
- Boughanmi in 2014

Personal information
- Nationality: Tunisian
- Born: 5 February 1990 (age 36) Tunis, Tunisia
- Height: 1.85 m (6 ft 1 in)

Sport
- Sport: Handball
- Position: Left wing
- Current club: Espérance de Tunis
- Number: 21

Senior clubs
- Years: Team
- 2008–2013: Club Africain
- 2013–2016: Tremblay Handball
- 2016–: Espérance de Tunis
National team
Years	Team	Apps	(Gls)
2011–	Tunisia	138	(621)
Medal record
African Championships
Gold medal – first place	2012 Morocco
Silver medal – second place	2014 Algeria
Silver medal – second place	2016 Egypt
Silver medal – second place	2020 Tunisia
Junior World Championships
Bronze medal – third place	2011 Greece

Oussama Boughanmi (born 5 February 1990) is a Tunisian handball player for Espérance de Tunis and the Tunisian national team.

He competed for the Tunisian national team at the 2012 Summer Olympics in London, where the Tunisian team reached the quarterfinals. He also participated at the 2016 Summer Olympics.

== Honours ==
=== Club ===
Club Africain

Arab Club Championship

- (gold) Winner: 2012 Berkane

Tunisia National Cup

- (gold) Winner: 2011

Espérance de Tunis

Arab Club Championship

- (gold) Winner: 2018 Sfax, 2021 Hammamet, 2022 Hammamet

Tunisian Handball League

- (gold) Winner: 2015–16, 2016–17, 2018–19, 2019–20, 2020–21

Tunisia National Cup

- (gold) Winner: 2018, 2021

African Handball Super Cup

- (gold) Winner: 2016, 2019

=== National team ===
African Championship

- Winner: 2012 Morocco
- Silver Medalist: 2014 Algeria, 2016 Egypt, 2020 Tunisia

Pan Arab Games

- Bronze Medalist: 2011 Qatar

Junior World Championship

- Bronze Medalist: 2011 Greece

=== Individual ===
- Best left wing in the 2011 Junior world championship
- Best left wing in the 2009 Youth world championship
