= 2008 African Handball Champions League =

Tournament details
- Host country: Morocco
- Venue: 1 (in 1 host city)
- Dates: November 27–December 6
- Teams: 13

Final positions
- Champions: (Algeria) GS Pétroliers (10th title)
- Runners-up: (Morocco) Rabita
- Third place: (Angola) 1º de Agosto
- Fourth place: (Cameroon) Minuh Yaoundé

The 2008 African Handball Champions League was the 30th edition, organized by the African Handball Confederation, under the auspices of the International Handball Federation, the handball sport governing body. The tournament was held from November 27 to December 6, 2008, at the Complexe sportif Mohammed V in Casablanca, Morocco, contested by 13 teams and won by Groupement Sportif des Pétroliers of Algeria.

== Draw ==
Group A	Group B	Group C
(Cameroon) FAP Yaoundé (Democratic Republic of the Congo) HC Héritage (Nigeria) Niger United (Angola) Primeiro de Agosto (Egypt) Talae El Djeich	(Gabon) CMS (Angola) Kabuscorp (Cameroon) Minuh Yaoundé (Ivory Coast) SOA	(Republic of the Congo) Étoile du Congo (Algeria) GS Pétroliers (Morocco) KACM (Morocco) Rabita de Casablanca

== Preliminary round ==
Times given below are in WET UTC+0.

=== Group A ===
27 November 2008
FAP Yaoundé (Cameroon)	22 : 26	(Egypt) Talae El Djeich
Niger United (Nigeria)	30 : 23	(Angola) 1º de Agosto
28 November 2008
1º de Agosto (Angola)	25 : 22	(Cameroon) FAP Yaoundé
HC Héritage (Democratic Republic of the Congo)	22 : 27	(Nigeria) Niger United
29 November 2008
FAP Yaoundé (Cameroon)	26 : 29	(Nigeria) Niger United
Talae El Djeich (Egypt)	38 : 27	(Democratic Republic of the Congo) HC Héritage
30 November 2008
Talae El Djeich (Egypt)	23 : 23	(Angola) 1º de Agosto
FAP Yaoundé (Cameroon)	31 : 27	(Democratic Republic of the Congo) HC Héritage
1 December 2008
1º de Agosto (Angola)	37 : 18	(Democratic Republic of the Congo) HC Héritage
Talae El Djeich (Egypt)	:	(Nigeria) Niger United

Team	Pld	W	D	L	GF	GA	GDIF	Pts

=== Group B ===
28 November 2008
Minuh Yaoundé (Cameroon)	26 : 27	(Angola) Kabuscorp
SOA (Ivory Coast)	21 : 24	(Gabon) CMS
29 November 2008
Kabuscorp (Angola)	23 : 12	(Ivory Coast) SOA
CMS (Gabon)	25 : 25	(Cameroon) Minuh Yaoundé
1 December 2008
Minuh Yaoundé (Cameroon)	:	(Ivory Coast) SOA
CMS (Gabon)	24 : 24	(Angola) Kabuscorp

Team	Pld	W	D	L	GF	GA	GDIF	Pts

=== Group C ===
27/28 November 2008
Rabita (Morocco)	34 : 27	(Republic of the Congo) Étoile du Congo
GS Pétroliers (Algeria)	28 : 27	(Morocco) KACM
29 November 2008
KACM (Morocco)	27 : 24	(Republic of the Congo) Étoile du Congo
Rabita (Morocco)	12 : 27	(Algeria) GS Pétroliers
30 November 2008
Étoile du Congo (Republic of the Congo)	22 : 30	(Algeria) GS Pétroliers
KACM (Morocco)	30 : 32	(Morocco) Rabita

Team	Pld	W	D	L	GF	GA	GDIF	Pts
(Algeria) GS Pétroliers	3	3	0	0	85	61	+24	6
(Morocco) Rabita	3	2	0	1	78	84	-6	4
(Morocco) KACM	3	1	0	2	84	84	0	2
(Republic of the Congo) Étoile du Congo	3	0	0	3	73	91	-18	0

* Note: Advance to quarter-finals
Relegated to 9-12th classification

== Knockout stage ==
Championship bracket

Quarter-finals
Thu 04 Dec 2008 –
(Angola) Kabuscorp	16
(Angola) 1º de Agosto	21
Thu 04 Dec 2008 –
(Algeria) GS Pétroliers	24
(Egypt) Talae El Djeich	22
Thu 04 Dec 2008 –
(Nigeria) Niger United
(Cameroon) Minuh Yaoundé
Thu 04 Dec 2008 –
(Morocco) Rabita	33
(Gabon) CMS	32

Semi-finals
Fri 05 Dec 2008
(Algeria) GS Pétroliers	27
(Angola) 1º de Agosto	14
Fri 05 Dec 2008
(Morocco) Rabita	26
(Cameroon) Minuh Yaoundé	23

Final
Sat 06 Dec 2008 –
(Algeria) GS Pétroliers	22
(Morocco) Rabita	20
Third place
Fri 05 Dec 2008 –
1º de Agosto	25
Minuh Yaoundé	24

5-8th bracket

5–8th place
Fri 05 Dec 2008
(Egypt) Talae El Djeich
Fri 05 Dec 2008
(Angola) Kabuscorp

Fifth place
Sat 06 Dec 2008 –
(Egypt) Talae El Djeich
(Nigeria) Niger United
Seventh place
Sat 06 Dec 2008 –
(Angola) Kabuscorp
(Gabon) CMS

9-12th bracket

9–12th place
Thu 04 Dec 2008 –
(Cameroon) FAP Yaoundé
Thu 04 Dec 2008 –
(Morocco) KACM

Ninth place
Fri 05 Dec 2008
(Cameroon) FAP Yaoundé
(Morocco) KACM
Eleventh place
Fri 05 Dec 2008
(Ivory Coast) SOA
(Republic of the Congo) Étoile du Congo

== Final ranking ==
Rank	Team	Record
Gold medal	(Algeria) GS Pétroliers	–
Silver medal	(Morocco) Rabita de Casablanca	–
Bronze medal	(Angola) 1º de Agosto	–
4	(Cameroon) Minuh Yaoundé	–
5	(Egypt) Talae El Djeich	–
6	(Nigeria) Niger United	–
7	(Angola) Kabuscorp	–
8	(Gabon) CMS	–
9	(Cameroon) FAP Yaoundé	–
10	(Morocco) KACM	–
11	(Ivory Coast) SOA	–
12	(Republic of the Congo) Étoile du Congo	–
13	(Democratic Republic of the Congo) HC Héritage	–

== Awards ==
2008 African Handball Champions Cup Winner

Groupement Sportif des Pétroliers
10th title

Best Player
