= Club Africain Women's Handball =

Tunisian handball team

Club Africain
- Full name: Club Africain
- Founded: 4 October 1956
- Arena: Salle Chérif Bellamine
- Capacity: 2,500
- League: National A
- 2022–23: National A, 1st
- Club colours
Home	Away

Club Africain Women's Handball Club (Arabic: النادي الإفريقي لكرة اليد للسيدات, English: African Club or CA) is a Tunisian handball team based in Capital Tunis, that plays in Tunisian Handball League Division A.it is the most decorated Tunisian Women's handball club having dominated the league and the cups.

== History ==
Club Africain’s women’s handball team remained virtually unbeatable for many years. It won its first league title in 1963 and went on to dominate Tunisian women’s handball from 1967 to 1969 and again from 1972 to 1988. The team also enjoyed considerable success in the Tunisian Cup, winning the competition in 1967, 1969, 1971, from 1973 to 1976, from 1978 to 1989, from 1991 to 1994, and again in 2016, 2017, 2021, 2022, 2023, 2024 In 1994, the team won its final league title before being disbanded in 1997. Club Africain later revived its women’s handball program at youth level before returning to the senior category during the 2013–2014 season. In 2014, the team won the Arab Women’s Handball Clubs Championship for the first time in the team's history, and return to won it in 2021, 2025 to become the dominant club in this competition.

== Honours ==
=== National titles ===
- Tunisian Handball League 30 :

Champions : 1962–63, 1966–67, 1967–68, 1968–69, 1971–72, 1972–73, 1973–74, 1974–75, 1975–76, 1976–77, 1977–78, 1978–79, 1979–80, 1980–81, 1981–82, 1982–83, 1983–84, 1984–85, 1985–86, 1986–87, 1987–88, 1992–93, 1993–94, 2015–16, 2016–17, 2018–19, 2019–20, 2020–21, 2023–24, 2024–25

- Tunisian Handball Cup 30 :

Champions : 1966–67, 1968–69, 1970–71, 1972–73, 1973–74, 1974–75, 1976–76, 1977–78, 1978–79, 1979–80, 1980–81, 1981–82, 1982–83, 1983–84, 1984–85, 1985–86, 1986–87, 1987–88, 1988–89, 1990–91, 1991–92, 1992–93, 1993–94, 2015–16, 2016–17, 2020–21, 2021–22, 2022–23, 2023–24, 2023–24

=== Regional titles ===
- Arab Women's Handball Championship of Champions 3 :

Champions : 2014, 2021, 2025

- Arab Women's Handball Championship of Winners' Cup 1 :

Champions : 2017

== Team ==
=== Current squad ===
Club Africain Handball roster
Goalkeepers: 11 (Tunisia) Echraf Abdallah; 16 (Tunisia) Fadia Omrani (C); 01 (Tunisia) Arbia Arfaoui; Wingers: 07 (Tunisia) Fatma Bouri; 09 (Tunisia) Amal Hamrouni; 21 (Tunisia) Mariem Rezgui; 03 (Tunisia) Rania Ben Ammar; Line players: 14 (Tunisia) Mouna Jlezi; 15 (Tunisia) Rakia Rezgui; 0? (Tunisia) Syrine Ben Helal	Back players: 0? (Tunisia) Oumayma Dardour; 05 (Tunisia) Aya Ben Abdallah; 95 (Tunisia) Sahar Haggui; 19 (Tunisia) Ghofrane Dridi; 0? (Tunisia) Oumayma Mannai; 0? (Tunisia) Jawaher Ferchichi	Technical staff: Head coach : (Tunisia) Mohammed Dallel; Assistant coach : (Tunisia) Khemais Belhaj Jalloul Rania Fezzani; Club doctor : (Tunisia) Khélil Soua

=== Notable players ===
- (Tunisia) Raja Toumi

== See also ==
- Club Africain (football)
- Club Africain (basketball)
- Club Africain (handball)
