= Saudi Women's Handball League =

- Current season, competition or edition: 2025–26 Saudi Women's Handball League
- Sport: Handball
- First season: 2021; 5 years ago
- Administrator: SAHF
- No. of teams: 6 teams
- Country: Saudi Arabia
- Confederation: AHF
- Continent: Asia
- Most recent champion: Al-Raed (1st title) (2025–26)
- Most titles: Al-Ahli (2 titles)
- Level on pyramid: Level 1
- Relegation to: National 2
- Domestic cups: Saudi Cup; Saudi Super Cup
- International cups: AHF Asian Club Championship; Arab Clubs Championship

The Saudi Women's Handball League (Arabic : دوري السيدات السعودي لكرة اليد ), also referred to as the Saudi Women's Handball Championship or the First Women's Handball League, is a women's handball competition in Saudi Arabia. It is organized by the Saudi Arabian Handball Federation (SAHF) through its women's committee.

The first official women's handball league in Saudi Arabia was held in Riyadh in December 2021. The tournament was described by the Saudi Arabian Handball Federation and Saudi media as the first official women's handball competition in the history of the sport in the country. Six teams participated in the inaugural competition, which was played from 27 to 30 December 2021. Najd won the inaugural title after defeating Najd Al-Mustaqbal in the final.

== History ==
=== Establishment ===
The Saudi Arabian Handball Federation established its women's committee as part of the development of women's handball in the Kingdom. In December 2021, the federation organized the first official women's handball league in Saudi Arabia.

The inaugural tournament was held in Riyadh from 27 to 30 December 2021. Six teams were divided into two groups of three teams each. The competition was staged at the sports hall of the Saudi Paralympic Committee in Riyadh.

Saudi government reference material also describes the 2021 competition as the first official women's handball league in the history of the sport in Saudi Arabia since the establishment of the Saudi Arabian Handball Federation.

=== Inaugural season ===
The inaugural edition featured six teams:

- Najd
- Jeddah Hands
- Al-Majd
- Najd Al-Mustaqbal
- Elite
- Al-Himma

The teams were divided into two groups. Najd, Jeddah Hands and Al-Majd formed one group, while Najd Al-Mustaqbal, Elite and Al-Himma formed the other. Najd and Elite advanced to the final. Najd subsequently defeated Najd Al-Mustaqbal 7–3 in the final to become the first champions of the competition.

== Format ==
The inaugural competition consisted of a group stage followed by knockout matches leading to the final. Six teams were divided into two groups of three.

The 2021 tournament was a short-format competition rather than a conventional long-season home-and-away league. The available sources do not establish that the competition subsequently adopted a permanent multi-round league format.

== Champions ==
Season	Edition	Champions	Runners-up	Final score
2021	1st	Najd	Najd Al-Mustaqbal	7–3
2022	No Competition			
2023	2nd	Al-Ahli Saudi FC	Al-Nahda	23–8
2024	3rd	Al-Ahli Saudi FC	Al-Ettifaq Club	33–11
2025	4th	Al-Ettifaq Club	Al-Nahda	18–10
2026	5th	Al-Raed	Al-Ettifaq Club	

== Performance by club ==
Rk.	Club	Titles	Seasons
1	Al-Ahli	2	2023, 2024
2	Najd	1	2021
=	Al-Ettifaq	1	2025
=	Al-Raed	1	2026

Note: The competition was not held in 2022; the second edition took place in 2023. The competition has subsequently been described as the Women's Kingdom Championship (بطولة المملكة النسائية لكرة اليد) in federation-related reporting.

== Officials and development ==
The inaugural league also included a development programme for female match officials. Saudi female referees who had participated in courses organized by the Saudi Arabian Handball Federation in cooperation with the Ministry of Sport's Leadership Preparation Institute were selected to officiate matches.

During the tournament, technical and refereeing workshops were also held for players and officials.

== Significance ==
The establishment of the women's handball league represented an important step in the development of women's sport in Saudi Arabia. The Saudi Arabian Handball Federation described the 2021 competition as the first official women's league in the sport's history in the Kingdom.

The competition also provided a domestic pathway for players and officials and contributed to the development of women's handball alongside the establishment and development of Saudi women's national-team activities.

== See also ==
- Saudi Arabian Handball Federation
- Saudi Women's national team
- Saudi Handball League
