= 2015 IHF Super Globe =

Tournament details
- Host country: Qatar
- Venue(s): 1 (in 1 host city)
- Dates: 7–10 September
- Teams: 8 (from 5 confederations)

Final positions
- Champions: (Germany) Füchse Berlin (1st title)
- Runner-up: (Hungary) MKB Veszprém
- Third place: (Spain) FC Barcelona
- Fourth place: (Australia) Sydney University

Tournament statistics
- Matches played: 12
- Goals scored: 572 (47.67 per match)
- Top scorer(s): (Serbia) Petar Nenadić (22 goals)

The 2015 IHF Super Globe was the ninth edition. It was held at the Duhail Handball Sports Hall in Doha, Qatar from 7–10 September 2015.

Füchse Berlin captured their first title by defeating MKB Veszprém in the final.

== Teams ==
Eight teams participated.

Team	Qualified as
(Spain) FC Barcelona	Defending champion
(Tunisia) Club Africain	Winner of African Champions League
(Australia) Sydney University	Winner of Oceania Champions Cup
(Brazil) HC Taubaté	Winner of Pan American Club Championship
(Hungary) MKB Veszprém	Runner-up of EHF Champions League (Note: FC Barcelona was the winner of the EHF Champions League but they are already qualified as Defending champion)
(Qatar) Al Sadd	Host
(Germany) Füchse Berlin	Wildcard as winner of EHF Cup
(Egypt) Al Ahly	Wildcard as runner-up of African Champions League (Note: Substitute of Asia)

== Results ==
All times are local (UTC+3).

=== Bracket ===
Quarterfinals
7 September
(Germany) Füchse Berlin	27
(Tunisia) Club Africain	24
7 September
(Spain) FC Barcelona	20
(Egypt) Al Ahly	16
7 September
(Qatar) Al Sadd	20
(Australia) Sydney University	21
7 September
(Hungary) MKB Veszprém	27
(Brazil) HC Taubaté	24

Semifinals
8 September
(Germany) Füchse Berlin	26
(Spain) FC Barcelona	25
8 September
(Australia) Sydney University	17
(Hungary) MKB Veszprém	29

Final
10 September
(Germany) Füchse Berlin (ET)	28
(Hungary) MKB Veszprém	27
Third place
10 September
(Spain) FC Barcelona	30
(Australia) Sydney University	20

5th place bracket

5–8th place semifinals
8 September
(Tunisia) Club Africain	17
(Egypt) Al Ahly	20
8 September
(Qatar) Al Sadd	24
(Brazil) HC Taubaté	32

Fifth place
10 September
(Egypt) Al Ahly	28
(Brazil) HC Taubaté	24
Seventh place
10 September
(Tunisia) Club Africain	26
(Qatar) Al Sadd	20

=== Quarterfinals ===
7 September 2015; 13:00	MKB Veszprém (Hungary)	27–24	(Brazil) HC Taubaté	Duhail Handball Sports Hall, Doha; Referees: El-Sayed, Rashed (EGY)
7 September 2015; 13:00	three players 5	(12–12)	Silva 5	Duhail Handball Sports Hall, Doha; Referees: El-Sayed, Rashed (EGY)
7 September 2015; 13:00	2× (yellow card) 5× (suspension)	Report	2× (yellow card) 3× (suspension)	Duhail Handball Sports Hall, Doha; Referees: El-Sayed, Rashed (EGY)

7 September 2015; 15:00	Füchse Berlin (Germany)	27–24	(Tunisia) Club Africain	Duhail Handball Sports Hall, Doha; Attendance: 1,200; Referees: Stark, Ştefan (ROU)
7 September 2015; 15:00	Nenadić 10	(14–12)	Soussi 6	Duhail Handball Sports Hall, Doha; Attendance: 1,200; Referees: Stark, Ştefan (ROU)
7 September 2015; 15:00	3× (yellow card) 3× (suspension)	Report	3× (yellow card) 3× (suspension)	Duhail Handball Sports Hall, Doha; Attendance: 1,200; Referees: Stark, Ştefan (ROU)

7 September 2015; 17:00	FC Barcelona (Spain)	20–16	(Egypt) Al Ahly	Duhail Handball Sports Hall, Doha; Attendance: 2,000; Referees: Volodkov, Zotin (RUS)
7 September 2015; 17:00	Jallouz 5	(12–8)	Abouebaid 5	Duhail Handball Sports Hall, Doha; Attendance: 2,000; Referees: Volodkov, Zotin (RUS)
7 September 2015; 17:00	3× (yellow card) 6× (suspension)	Report	3× (yellow card) 5× (suspension) 1× (red card)	Duhail Handball Sports Hall, Doha; Attendance: 2,000; Referees: Volodkov, Zotin (RUS)

7 September 2015; 20:00	Al Sadd (Qatar)	20–21	(Australia) Sydney University	Duhail Handball Sports Hall, Doha; Attendance: 3,000; Referees: Kolahdouzan, Mousaviannazhad (IRN)
7 September 2015; 20:00	Al-Ghamdi 6	(10–9)	Llorente 9	Duhail Handball Sports Hall, Doha; Attendance: 3,000; Referees: Kolahdouzan, Mousaviannazhad (IRN)
7 September 2015; 20:00	3× (yellow card) 3× (suspension)	Report	3× (yellow card) 4× (suspension)	Duhail Handball Sports Hall, Doha; Attendance: 3,000; Referees: Kolahdouzan, Mousaviannazhad (IRN)

=== 5–8th place semifinals ===
8 September 2015; 14:00	Club Africain (Tunisia)	17–20	(Egypt) Al Ahly	Duhail Handball Sports Hall, Doha; Attendance: 2,000; Referees: Kolahdouzan, Mousaviannazhad (IRN)
8 September 2015; 14:00	Bannour 10	(9–9)	Abouebaid 4	Duhail Handball Sports Hall, Doha; Attendance: 2,000; Referees: Kolahdouzan, Mousaviannazhad (IRN)
8 September 2015; 14:00	3× (yellow card) 7× (suspension)	Report	3× (yellow card) 3× (suspension)	Duhail Handball Sports Hall, Doha; Attendance: 2,000; Referees: Kolahdouzan, Mousaviannazhad (IRN)

8 September 2015; 16:00	Al Sadd (Qatar)	24–32	(Brazil) HC Taubaté	Duhail Handball Sports Hall, Doha; Referees: Volodkov, Zotin (RUS)
8 September 2015; 16:00	Abdelhak 11	(11–15)	Teixeira 6	Duhail Handball Sports Hall, Doha; Referees: Volodkov, Zotin (RUS)
8 September 2015; 16:00	3× (yellow card) 4× (suspension)	Report	3× (yellow card) 4× (suspension)	Duhail Handball Sports Hall, Doha; Referees: Volodkov, Zotin (RUS)

=== Semifinals ===
8 September 2015; 18:00	Füchse Berlin (Germany)	26–25	(Spain) FC Barcelona	Duhail Handball Sports Hall, Doha; Attendance: 2,000; Referees: El-Sayed, Rashed (EGY)
8 September 2015; 18:00	Nenadić 8	(12–15)	Lazarov 11	Duhail Handball Sports Hall, Doha; Attendance: 2,000; Referees: El-Sayed, Rashed (EGY)
8 September 2015; 18:00	2× (yellow card) 3× (suspension)	Report	2× (yellow card) 2× (suspension)	Duhail Handball Sports Hall, Doha; Attendance: 2,000; Referees: El-Sayed, Rashed (EGY)

8 September 2015; 20:00	Sydney University (Australia)	17–29	(Hungary) MKB Veszprém	Duhail Handball Sports Hall, Doha; Attendance: 1,500; Referees: Krstić, Ljubič (SLO)
8 September 2015; 20:00	Lennström 4	(5–9)	Ilić 8	Duhail Handball Sports Hall, Doha; Attendance: 1,500; Referees: Krstić, Ljubič (SLO)
8 September 2015; 20:00	3× (yellow card) 5× (suspension) 1× (red card)	Report	3× (yellow card) 4× (suspension)	Duhail Handball Sports Hall, Doha; Attendance: 1,500; Referees: Krstić, Ljubič (SLO)

=== Seventh place game ===
10 September 2015; 14:00	Club Africain (Tunisia)	26–20	(Qatar) Al Sadd	Duhail Handball Sports Hall, Doha; Referees: Volodkov, Zotin (RUS)
10 September 2015; 14:00	Ben Ghali, Ben Salah 6	(9–8)	Padežanin 6	Duhail Handball Sports Hall, Doha; Referees: Volodkov, Zotin (RUS)
10 September 2015; 14:00	4× (yellow card) 5× (suspension)	Report	3× (yellow card)	Duhail Handball Sports Hall, Doha; Referees: Volodkov, Zotin (RUS)

=== Fifth place game ===
10 September 2015; 16:00	Al Ahly (Egypt)	28–24	(Brazil) HC Taubaté	Duhail Handball Sports Hall, Doha; Attendance: 1,500; Referees: Krstić, Ljubič (SLO)
10 September 2015; 16:00	Mohamed 6	(16–11)	Pacheco 5	Duhail Handball Sports Hall, Doha; Attendance: 1,500; Referees: Krstić, Ljubič (SLO)
10 September 2015; 16:00	2× (yellow card) 4× (suspension)	Report	3× (yellow card) 4× (suspension)	Duhail Handball Sports Hall, Doha; Attendance: 1,500; Referees: Krstić, Ljubič (SLO)

=== Third place game ===
10 September 2015; 18:00	FC Barcelona (Spain)	30–20	(Australia) Sydney University	Duhail Handball Sports Hall, Doha; Referees: Kolahdouzan, Mousaviannazhad (IRN)
10 September 2015; 18:00	four players 4	(15–10)	Llorente 5	Duhail Handball Sports Hall, Doha; Referees: Kolahdouzan, Mousaviannazhad (IRN)
10 September 2015; 18:00	3× (yellow card) 5× (suspension)	Report	3× (yellow card) 4× (suspension)	Duhail Handball Sports Hall, Doha; Referees: Kolahdouzan, Mousaviannazhad (IRN)

=== Final ===
10 September 2015
20:00
Füchse Berlin (Germany)
28–27 (ET)
(Hungary) MKB Veszprém
Duhail Handball Sports Hall, Doha
Attendance: 5,000
Referees: Stark, Ştefan (ROU)
Tønnesen 6
(15–13)
Sulić 8
3× (yellow card) 4× (suspension)
Report
2× (yellow card) 3× (suspension)

FT: 24–24 ET: 4–3

== Final ranking ==
1st place, gold medalist(s)	(Germany) Füchse Berlin
2nd place, silver medalist(s)	(Hungary) MKB Veszprém
3rd place, bronze medalist(s)	(Spain) FC Barcelona
4	(Australia) Sydney University
5	(Egypt) Al Ahly
6	(Brazil) HC Taubaté
7	(Tunisia) Club Africain
8	(Qatar) Al Sadd
