= 2010 African Handball Champions League =

Tournament details
- Host country: Morocco
- Venue(s): 2 (in 1 host city)
- Dates: October 21–30
- Teams: 17

Final positions
- Champions: (Tunisia) Étoile du Sahel (1st title)
- Runners-up: (Algeria) GS Pétroliers
- Third place: (Algeria) JSE Skikda
- Fourth place: (Morocco) Rabita de Casablanca

The 2010 African Handball Champions League was the 32nd edition, organized by the African Handball Confederation, under the auspices of the International Handball Federation, the handball sport governing body. The tournament was held from October 21–30, 2010 at the Complexe Sportif Mohammed V in Casablanca, Morocco, contested by 17 teams and won by Étoile Sportive du Sahel of Tunisia.

== Draw ==
Group A	Group B	Group C	Group C
(Democratic Republic of the Congo) Blessing (Algeria) GS Pétroliers (Guinea) Novotel (Angola) Primeiro de Agosto	(Libya) Al-Nasr Benghazi (Republic of the Congo) Inter Club (Algeria) JSE Skikda (Angola) Kabuscorp	(Cameroon) Minuh Yaoundé (Morocco) Rabita de Casablanca (Ivory Coast) SOA (Senegal) US Gorée (Egypt) Zamalek	(Burundi) AS Sonaby (Tunisia) Étoile du Sahel (Cameroon) FAP Yaoundé (Gabon) Stade Mandji

== Preliminary round ==
Times given below are in WET UTC+0.

=== Group A ===
Fri, 22 Oct 2010
GS Pétroliers (Algeria)	27 : 18	(Angola) 1º de Agosto
Novotel (Guinea)	23 : 41	(Democratic Republic of the Congo) Blessing
Sun, 24 Oct 2010
Blessing (Democratic Republic of the Congo)	20 : 29	(Algeria) GS Pétroliers
1º de Agosto (Angola)	36 : 13	(Guinea) Novotel
Mon, 25 Oct 2010
Novotel (Guinea)	14 : 39	(Algeria) GS Pétroliers
Blessing (Democratic Republic of the Congo)	21 : 26	(Angola) 1º de Agosto

Team	Pld	W	D	L	GF	GA	GDIF	Pts
(Algeria) GS Pétroliers	3	3	0	0	95	52	+43	6
(Angola) 1º de Agosto	3	2	0	1	80	61	+19	4
(Democratic Republic of the Congo) Blessing	3	1	0	2	82	78	+4	2
(Guinea) Novotel	3	0	0	3	57	109	-52	0

* Note: Advance to quarter-finals
Relegated to 9-12th classification
Relegated to 13-16th classification

=== Group B ===
Fri, 22 Oct 2010
Inter Club (Republic of the Congo)	38 : 37	(Libya) Al-Nasr
Kabuscorp (Angola)	31 : 26	(Algeria) JSE Skikda
Sun, 24 Oct 2010
JSE Skikda (Algeria)	32 : 26	(Republic of the Congo) Inter Club
Al-Nasr (Libya)	26 : 30	(Angola) Kabuscorp
Tue, 26 Oct 2010
Kabuscorp (Angola)	22 : 31	(Republic of the Congo) Inter Club
JSE Skikda (Algeria)	39 : 27	(Libya) Al-Nasr

Team	Pld	W	D	L	GF	GA	GDIF	Pts
(Algeria) JSE Skikda	3	2	0	1	97	84	+13	4
(Republic of the Congo) Inter Club	3	2	0	1	95	91	+4	4
(Angola) Kabuscorp	3	2	0	1	83	83	0	4
(Libya) Al-Nasr	3	0	0	3	90	107	-17	0

* Note: Advance to quarter-finals
Relegated to 9-12th classification
Relegated to 13-16th classification

=== Group C ===
Thu/Fri, 21/22 Oct 2010
Rabita (Morocco)	32 : 20	(Senegal) US Gorée
Minuh Yaoundé (Cameroon)	22 : 26	(Egypt) Zamalek
Sat, 23 Oct 2010
US Gorée (Senegal)	28 : 28	(Cameroon) Minuh Yaoundé
SOA (Ivory Coast)	16 : 21	(Morocco) Rabita
Sun, 24 Oct 2010
Zamalek (Egypt)	39 : 24	(Senegal) US Gorée
Minuh Yaoundé (Cameroon)	24 : 16	(Ivory Coast) SOA
Mon, 25 Oct 2010
SOA (Ivory Coast)	23 : 31	(Egypt) Zamalek
Rabita (Morocco)	29 : 27	(Cameroon) Minuh Yaoundé
Tue, 26 Oct 2010
US Gorée (Senegal)	19 : 19	(Ivory Coast) SOA
Zamalek (Egypt)	34 : 27	(Morocco) Rabita

Team	Pld	W	D	L	GF	GA	GDIF	Pts
(Egypt) Zamalek	4	0	0	4	130	96	+34	8
(Morocco) Rabita	4	3	0	1	109	97	+12	6
(Cameroon) Minuh	4	1	1	2	101	99	+2	3
(Senegal) US Gorée	4	0	2	2	91	118	-27	2
(Ivory Coast) SOA	4	0	1	3	74	95	-21	1

* Note: Advance to quarter-finals
Relegated to 9-12th classification
Relegated to 13-16th classification

=== Group D ===
Sat, 23 Oct 2010
Stade Mandji (Gabon)	22 : 28	(Tunisia) ES Sahel
FAP Yaoundé (Cameroon)	24 : 35	(Burundi) AS Sonaby
Mon, 25 Oct 2010
ES Sahel (Tunisia)	26 : 25	(Cameroon) FAP Yaoundé
AS Sonaby (Burundi)	26 : 33	(Gabon) Stade Mandji
Tue, 26 Oct 2010
Stade Mandji (Gabon)	27 : 18	(Cameroon) FAP Yaoundé
ES Sahel (Tunisia)	51 : 17	(Burundi) AS Sonaby

Team	Pld	W	D	L	GF	GA	GDIF	Pts
(Tunisia) ES Sahel	3	3	0	0	105	64	+41	6
(Gabon) Stade Mandji	3	2	0	1	82	72	+10	4
(Cameroon) FAP Yaoundé	3	1	0	2	67	88	-21	2
(Burundi) AS Sonaby	3	0	0	3	78	108	-30	0

* Note: Advance to quarter-finals
Relegated to 9-12th classification
Relegated to 13-16th classification

== Knockout stage ==
Championship bracket

Quarter-finals
Thu 28 Oct 2010 – 10:00
(Algeria) GS Pétroliers	30
(Gabon) Stade Mandji	14
Thu 28 Oct 2010 – 18:00
(Tunisia) ES Sahel	27
(Angola) 1º de Agosto	22
Thu 28 Oct 2010 – 18:00
(Egypt) Zamalek	30
(Algeria) JSE Skikda	32
Thu 28 Oct 2010 – 20:00
(Republic of the Congo) Inter Club	27
(Morocco) Rabita	31

Semi-finals
Fri 29 Oct 2010 – 15:00
(Tunisia) ES Sahel	37
(Algeria) JSE Skikda	28
Fri 29 Oct 2010 – 19:00
(Algeria) GS Pétroliers	22
(Morocco) Rabita	19

Final
Sat 30 Oct 2010 – 16:30
(Tunisia) ES Sahel	26
(Algeria) GS Pétroliers	22
Third place
Sat 30 Oct 2010 – 11:00
(Morocco) Rabita	31
(Algeria) JSE Skikda	35

5-8th bracket

5–8th place
Fri 28 Oct 2011 -
(Egypt) Zamalek
Fri 28 Oct 2011 -
(Republic of the Congo) Inter Club

Fifth place
Sat 29 Oct 2011 –
(Egypt) Zamalek
(Republic of the Congo) Inter Club
Seventh place
Sat 29 Oct 2011 –
(Angola) 1º de Agosto
(Gabon) Stade Mandji

9-12th bracket

9–12th place
Fri 28 Oct 2011 -
(Cameroon) Minuh	27
(Angola) Kabuscorp	21
Fri 28 Oct 2011 -
(Cameroon) FAP Yaoundé	31
(Democratic Republic of the Congo) Blessing	26

Ninth place
Sat 29 Oct 2011 –
(Cameroon) Minuh
(Cameroon) FAP Yaoundé
Eleventh place
Sat 29 Oct 2011 –
(Democratic Republic of the Congo) Blessing	32
(Angola) Kabuscorp	31

13-16th bracket

12–16th place
Fri 28 Oct 2011 - 14:30
(Libya) Al-Nasr	10
(Senegal) US Gorée *	0
Fri 28 Oct 2011 - 16:30
(Burundi) AS Sonaby	10
(Guinea) Novotel *	0

Thirteenth place
Sat 29 Oct 2011 – 09:00
(Burundi) AS Sonaby	32
(Libya) Al-Nasr	37
Fifteenth place
Sat 29 Oct 2011 – 10:30

* Penalty for failing to pay participation fees

== Final ranking ==
Rank	Team	Record
Gold medal	(Tunisia) Étoile du Sahel	–
Silver medal	(Algeria) GS Pétroliers	–
Bronze medal	(Algeria) JSE Skikda	–
4	(Morocco) Rabita de Casablanca	–
5	(Egypt) Zamalek	–
6	(Republic of the Congo) Inter Club	–
7	(Angola) 1º de Agosto	–
8	(Gabon) Stade Mandji	–
9	(Cameroon) Minuh	–
10	(Cameroon) FAP Yaoundé	–
11	(Democratic Republic of the Congo) Blessing	–
12	(Angola) Kabuscorp	–
13	(Libya) Al-Nasr	–
14	(Burundi) AS Sonaby	–
15	(Senegal) US Gorée	–
16	(Guinea) Novotel	–
17	(Ivory Coast) SOA	–

== Awards ==
2010 African Handball Champions Cup Winner

Étoile Sportive du Sahel
1st title

Best Player
