= Tunisian Women's Handball Cup =

- Founded: 1964
- Country: Tunisia
- Confederation: CAHB (Africa)
- Most recent champion: Club Africain (2024–25)
- Most titles: Club Africain (30 titles)
- Broadcasters: TV Tunisia 1, TV Tunisia 2
- International cup: Cup Winners' Cup
- Website: federationhandball.tn
- 2025–26 Tunisian Women's Handball Cup

The Tunisian Women's Handball Cup or in ( Arabic language : كأس تونس لكرة اليد للسيدات ) is a Tunisian women's handball competition held every year since its inception in 1964, it is Ruled by The Tunisian Handball Federation. Club Africain is the dominant club with more than 30 Cups record 12 of them are consecutive, Followed by ASF Sahel by 10 Cups and in third rank we find ASE Ariana by 4 Cups, However The Cup winners will Qualify directly to the Cup Winners' Cup.

== Winners list ==
No.	Season	Champion
1	1964–1965	CA Gas
2	1965–1966	CA Gas
3	1966–1967	Club Africain
4	1967–1968	Stade Soussien
5	1968–1969	Club Africain
6	1969–1970	Zitouna Sports
7	1970–1971	Club Africain
8	1971–1972	Zitouna Sports
9	1972–1973	Club Africain
10	1973–1974	Club Africain
11	1974–1975	Club Africain
12	1975–1976	Club Africain
13	1976–1977	ASF Tunis
14	1977–1978	Club Africain
15	1978–1979	Club Africain
16	1979–1980	Club Africain
17	1980–1981	Club Africain
18	1981–1982	Club Africain
19	1982–1983	Club Africain
20	1983–1984	Club Africain
21	1984–1985	Club Africain
22	1985–1986	Club Africain
23	1986–1987	Club Africain
24	1987–1988	Club Africain
25	1988–1989	Club Africain
26	1989–1990	Zaoui Meubles Sports*
27	1990–1991	Club Africain
28	1991–1992	Club Africain
29	1992–1993	Club Africain
30	1993–1994	Club Africain

No.	Season	Champion
31	1994–1995	AS Mégrine
32	1995–1996	ASF Sahel
33	1996–1997	ASF Sahel
34	1997–1998	ASF Sahel
35	1998–1999	ASF Sahel
36	1999–2000	ASF Sahel
37	2000–2001	ASF Sahel
38	2001–2002	ASF Sahel
39	2002–2003	ASE Ariana
40	2003–2004	ASF Sahel
41	2004–2005	ASF Mahdia
42	2005–2006	ASE Ariana
43	2006–2007	ASF Sfax
44	2007–2008	ASE Ariana
45	2008–2009	ASF Sfax
46	2009–2010	ASF Sahel
47	2010–2011	ES Rejiche
48	2011–2012	ES Rejiche
49	2012–2013	ASE Ariana
50	2013–2014	ASF Mahdia
51	2014–2015	ASF Téboulba
52	2015–2016	Club Africain
53	2016–2017	Club Africain
54	2017–2018	ASF Téboulba
55	2018–2019	ASF Sfax
56	2019–2020	ES Rejiche
57	2020–2021	Club Africain
58	2021–2022	Club Africain
59	2022–2023	Club Africain
60	2023–2024	Club Africain
61	2024–2025	Club Africain

== Most successful clubs ==
Rank	Club	Titles
1	Club Africian	30
2	ASF Sahel	10
3	ASE Ariana	4
4	ASF Sfax	3
=	ES Rejiche	3
6	Zitouna Sports	2
=	ASF Téboulba	2
=	ASF Mahdia	2
=	CA Gas	2
10	ASF Tunis	1
=	AS Mégrine	1
=	Stade Soussien	1

- Notes: : ASF Sahel old name was Zaoui Meubles Sports

== See also ==
- Tunisian Handball League
- Tunisian Handball Cup
- Tunisian Women's Handball League
