= Arab Women's Handball Championship of Winners' Cup =

International club handball competition

- Founded: 2013
- Country: Arab World
- Confederation: AHF
- Most recent champion: (Tunisia) ASF Sfax (2018)
- Most titles: (Algeria) GS Pétroliers (2 title)
- 2018 Arab Women's Championship of CWC

The Arab Women's Handball Championship of Club Winners' Cup, also known as the Princess Khadija Handball Championship, is an international club handball competition organized by the Arab Handball Federation.

== Results ==
| Year | Host | Final | | | Third place match | | |
| Year | Host | Champion | Score | Second place | Third place | Score | Fourth place |
|---|---|---|---|---|---|---|---|
| 2013; Details | (Morocco); Marrakesh | (Algeria); GS Pétroliers | 32 – 15 | (Tunisia); AS Mégrine | (Egypt); Al Ahly HBC | – | (Algeria); ESF Constantine |
| 2015; Details | (Morocco); Agadir | (Algeria); GS Pétroliers | – | (Algeria); HBC El Biar | (Egypt); Al Ahly HBC | – | (Morocco); Raja Agadir |
| 2017; Details | (Tunisia); Hammamet | (Tunisia); Club Africain | 26 – 23 | (Algeria); GS Pétroliers | (Tunisia); AS Mégrine | — | |
| 2018; Details | (Tunisia); Sfax | (Tunisia); ASF Sfax | 28 – 24 | (Tunisia); Club Africain | (Algeria); HBC El Biar | 35 – 11 | (Algeria); ESF Constantine |

MC Alger (ex. GS Pétroliers).

== Winners by club ==
| Rank | Club | Winners | Runners-up | Third | Total |
|---|---|---|---|---|---|
| 1 | (Algeria) MC Alger | 2 | 1 | 0 | 3 |
| 2 | (Tunisia) Club Africain | 1 | 1 | 0 | 2 |
| 3 | (Tunisia) ASF Sfax | 1 | 0 | 0 | 1 |
| 4 | (Tunisia) AS Mégrine | 0 | 1 | 1 | 2 |
| - | (Algeria) HBC El Biar | 0 | 1 | 1 | 2 |
| 6 | (Egypt) Al Ahly HBC | 0 | 0 | 2 | 2 |

MC Alger (ex. GS Pétroliers).

== Winners by country ==
| Rank | Nation | Winners | Runners-up | Third | Total |
|---|---|---|---|---|---|
| 1 | Algeria | 2 | 2 | 2 | 6 |
| 1 | Tunisia | 2 | 2 | 2 | 6 |
| 3 | Egypt | 0 | 0 | 2 | 6 |

== See also ==
- Arab Women's Handball Championship of Champions
- Arab Women's Handball Super Cup
- Arab Handball Championship of Champions
- Arab Handball Championship of Winners' Cup
- Arab Handball Super Cup
