= Arab Handball Federation =

International sports governing body

Arab Handball Federation AHF
- Sport: Handball
- Official website: arabhandball.com

History
- Year of formation: 16 March 1975; 51 years ago Riyadh, Saudi Arabia

Demographics
- Membership size: 16 Members
- International federation: International Handball Federation (IHF)
- IHF member since: 1975
- Other affiliation(s): African Handball Confederation; Asian Handball Federation

Secretariat
- Address: Prince Faisal bin Fahd Olympic Complex Prince Faisal bin Fahd St 11432 Al Faruq, Riyadh
- Country: Saudi Arabia
- Official Language(s): Arabic & English

The Arab Handball Federation (Arabic: الاتحاد العربي لكرة اليد) or simply AHF is a handball association for countries in the Arab world. It organises the Championships for national teams in the men and women categories, as well as for clubs.

The Arab Handball Federation (AHF) is the governing body of handball in the Arab world. It organizes regional competitions, promotes the sport among Arab nations, and represents Arab handball internationally. The federation works alongside the International Handball Federation and the Asian Handball Federation.

== History ==
The Arab Handball Federation was founded on 16 March 1975 in Riyadh, Saudi Arabia.

Its mission was to unify Arab handball activities and organize regional championships. Over the years, the federation has expanded its membership and hosted numerous tournaments across the Arab world.

== Competitions ==
=== For nations ===
- Arab Men's Handball Cup
- Arab Men's Junior Handball Championship (U-20)
- Arab Men's Youth Handball Championship (U-17)
- Arab Women's Handball Championship

=== For clubs ===
- Arab Handball Championship of Champions
- Arab Handball Championship of Winners' Cup
- Arab Handball Super Cup
- Arab Women's Handball Championship of Champions
- Arab Women's Handball Championship of Winners' Cup
- Arab Women's Handball Super Cup

=== Related competition ===
- Handball at the Arab Games (men & women)
