= Sport in Tunisia =

Football is the most popular sport in Tunisia. The most watched sports in Tunisia are football, handball, basketball, volleyball, tennis, and rugby union.

Sport is encouraged in school, and local sports clubs receive financial support from the local governments.

The national stadium is the Stade Olympique de Radès.

== Football ==
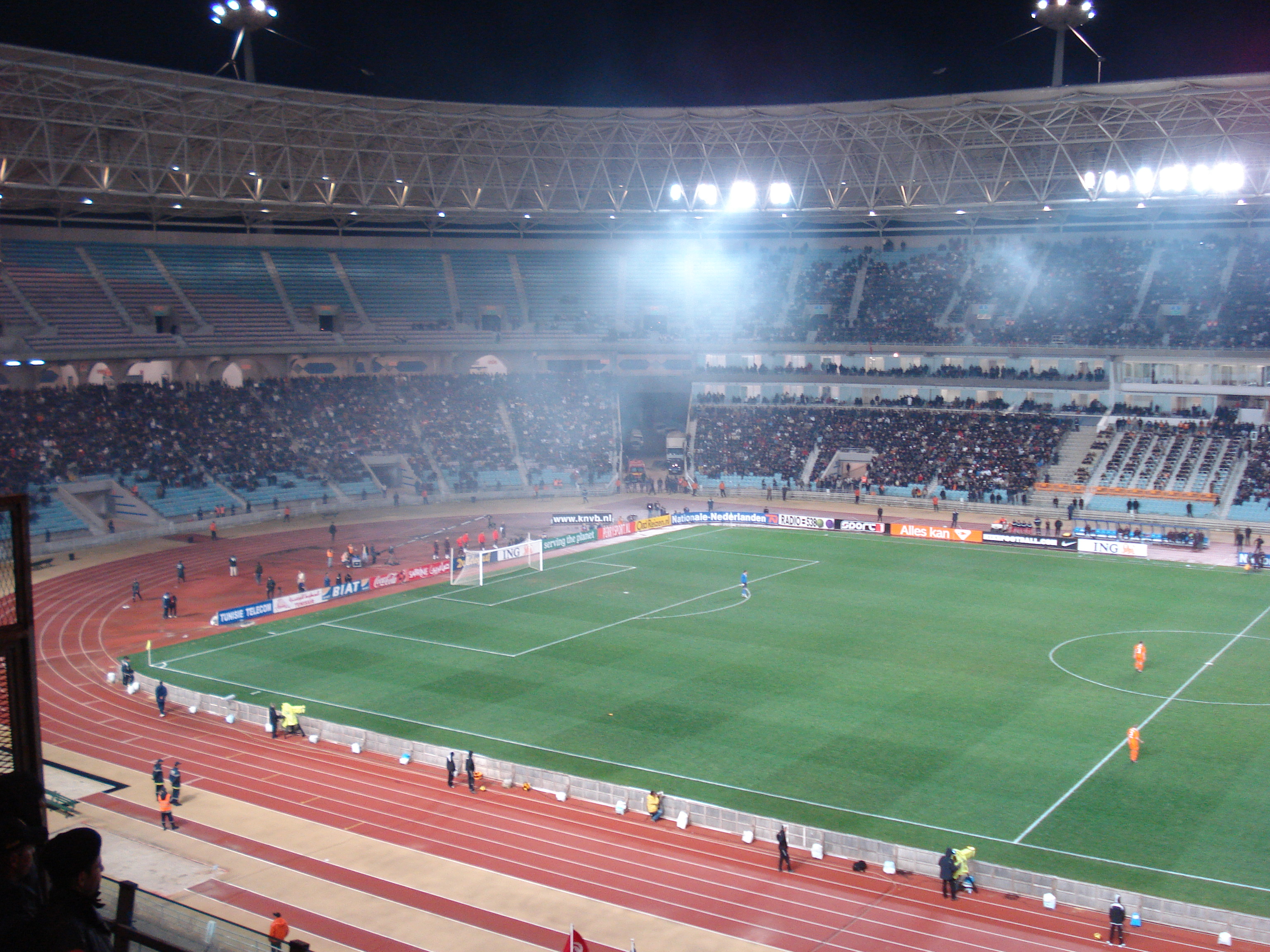
Stade Olympique de Radès

Football is the most popular sport in Tunisia. The Tunisia national football team, also known as "The Eagles of Carthage", won the 2004 African Cup of Nations (CAN) which was held in Tunisia. They also represented Africa in the 2005 Confederations Cup which was held in Germany, but they could not go beyond the first round. The Eagles of Carthage have participated in 6 FIFA World Cup Championships.

The Premier Football League is the "Tunisian Ligue Professionnelle 1". The main clubs are Espérance Sportive de Tunis, Club Africain, Club Sportif Sfaxien and Étoile du Sahel. The latter team participated in the 2007 FIFA Club World Cup and reached the semi-final match, in which it was eliminated by Boca Juniors from Argentina.

== Handball ==
Handball is the second most popular sport in Tunisia. The Tunisia men's national handball team has participated in Handball World Championships. In 2005, Tunisia held the 2005 Handball World Championship, and they came fourth. The national league consists of about 12 teams, with Club Africain, Etoile du Sahel and Espérance Sportive de Tunis dominating. The Tunisian national handball team won the African Cup 10 times. The Tunisians won the 2012 African Cup in Morocco for the 2nd Consecutive time and it is the 9th title at all by defeating Algeria in the final, the last time tunisia won the African Cup was in 2018 against Egypt.

== Basketball ==
Tunisia is one of the few North African nations to have won the FIBA Africa Championship, which it has done on three occasions, most recently in 2017 and 2021.

== Beach volleyball ==
Tunisia featured a men's national team in beach volleyball that competed at the 2018–2020 CAVB Beach Volleyball Continental Cup.

== Cycling ==
Cycling is a recreational sport, with the Tour De Tunisia, being the main annual competition of Cycling in Tunisia.

== Rugby union ==
Rugby union is mostly played in the north of Tunisia. They are currently ranked 44th in the men's rankings.

== Tennis ==
In tennis, Tunisia holds a tournament called Tunis Open. Tennis is a minor sport in Tunisia. The Tunisian Tennis Federation is governing body of sport in Tunisia.

== See also ==
- Tunisia at the Olympics
- Tunisia at the Paralympics
