= Tunisian Handball Cup =

- Founded: 1956
- Country: Tunisia
- Confederation: CAHB (Africa)
- Most recent champion: Espérance de Tunis (2025–26)
- Most titles: Espérance de Tunis (32 titles)
- Broadcasters: TV Tunisia 1 TV Tunisia 2
- International cup: African Cup Winners' Cup
- Website: federationhandball.tn
- 2025–26 Tunisian Handball Cup

The Tunisian Handball Cup is an elimination handball tournament held annually in Tunisia. It is the second local most important competition in handball after the Tunisian Handball League. It started in 1956, just after Tunisia had gained its Independence, The tournament is dominated mostly by two teams from Tunis with Espérance de Tunis won 32 tournament Cups as a record 16 of them are consecutive followed by Club Africain with 19 Cups and Third team we find Etoile du Sahel with 7 Cups, however The tournament winners will represent Tunisia in the African Handball Cup Winners' Cup.

== Winners list ==
No.	Season	Champion
1	1955–56	Stade Gaulois (1)
2	1956–57	USM Menzel Bourguiba (1)
3	1957–58	Force Sports Club (Tunis) (1)
4	1958–59	Force Sports Club (Tunis) (2)
5	1959–60	Espérance de Tunis (1)
6	1960–61	ASPTT Tunis (1)
7	1961–62	ASPTT Tunis (2)
8	1962–63	Al Mansoura Chaâbia Hammam-Lif (1)
9	1963–64	Club Africain (1)
10	1964–65	Club Africain (2)
11	1965–66	Club Africain (3)
12	1966–67	Club Africain (4)
13	1967–68	Club Africain (5)
14	1968–69	Club Africain (6)
15	1969–70	Espérance de Tunis (2)
16	1970–71	Espérance de Tunis (3)
17	1971–72	Espérance de Tunis (4)
18	1972–73	Espérance de Tunis (5)
19	1973–74	Espérance de Tunis (6)
20	1974–75	Espérance de Tunis (7)
21	1975–76	Espérance de Tunis (8)
22	1976–77	Not Held
23	1977–78	Espérance de Tunis (9)
24	1978–79	Espérance de Tunis (10)

No.	Season	Champion
25	1979–80	Espérance de Tunis (11)
26	1980–81	Espérance de Tunis (12)
27	1981–82	Espérance de Tunis (13)
28	1982–83	Espérance de Tunis (14)
29	1983–84	Espérance de Tunis (15)
30	1984–85	Espérance de Tunis (16)
31	1985–86	Espérance de Tunis (17)
32	1986–87	Club Africain (7)
33	1987–88	Club Africain (8)
34	1988–89	Club Africain (9)
35	1989–90	El Mahdia HC (1)
36	1990–91	Étoile du Sahel (1)
37	1991–92	Espérance de Tunis (18)
38	1992–93	Espérance de Tunis (19)
39	1993–94	Espérance de Tunis (20)
40	1994–95	Espérance de Tunis (21)
41	1995–96	Club Africain (10)
42	1996–97	Club Africain (11)
43	1997–98	Club Africain (12)
44	1998–99	El Mahdia HC (2)
45	1999–00	Étoile du Sahel (2)
46	2000–01	Club Africain (13)
47	2001–02	Espérance de Tunis (22)
48	2002–03	Club Africain (14)

No.	Season	Champion
49	2003–04	Club Africain (15)
50	2004–05	Espérance de Tunis (23)
51	2005–06	Espérance de Tunis (24)
52	2006–07	Club Africain (16)
53	2007–08	Étoile du Sahel (3)
54	2008–09	Étoile du Sahel (4)
55	2009–10	Étoile du Sahel (5)
56	2010–11	Club Africain (17)
57	2011–12	AS Hammamet (1)
58	2012–13	Espérance de Tunis (25)
59	2013–14	Étoile du Sahel (6)
60	2014–15	Club Africain (18)
61	2015–16	Club Africain (19)
62	2016–17	Étoile du Sahel (7)
63	2017–18	Espérance de Tunis (26)
64	2018–19	Club sportif de Sakiet Ezzit (1)
65	2019–20	Club sportif de Sakiet Ezzit (2)
66	2020–21	Espérance de Tunis (27)
67	2021–22	Espérance de Tunis (28)
68	2022–23	Espérance de Tunis (29)
69	2023–24	Espérance de Tunis (30)
70	2024–25	Espérance de Tunis (31)
71	2025–26	Espérance de Tunis (32)

== Most successful clubs ==
Rank	Club	Champions
1	Espérance de Tunis	32
2	Club Africain	19
3	Étoile du Sahel	7
4	El Makarem de Mahdia	2
4	Club sportif de Sakiet Ezzit	2
4	Force Sports Club (Tunis)	2
4	ASPTT Tunis	2
7	AS Hammamet	1
7	Stade Gaulois	1
7	USM Menzel Bourguiba	1
7	Al Mansoura Chaâbia (Hammam-Lif)	1

== See also ==
- Tunisian Handball League
- Tunisian Women's Handball League
- Tunisian Women's Handball Cup
