= Oumayma Dardour =

Tunisian handball player

Personal information
- Nationality: Tunisian
- Born: 6 January 1996 (age 30) Djerba, Tunisia
- Height: 1.78 m (5 ft 10 in)

Sport
- Sport: Handball
- Position: Right back
- Current club: Rouen Handball

Senior clubs
- Years: Team
- 2014-?: Club Africain
- 2019-2020: Handball Plan-de-Cuques
- 2020-2021: Le Havre
- 2021-: Rouen Handball
National team
Years	Team	Apps	(Gls)
–	Tunisia	88	(191)
Medal record
African Championship
Bronze medal – third place	2021 Yaoundé
Bronze medal – third place	2024 Kinshasa
Mediterranean Games
Silver medal – second place	2026 Taranto	Team

Oumayma Dardour (born 6 January 1996) is a Tunisian handball player for Club Africain and the Tunisian national team.

She participated at the 2015 and 2017 World Women's Handball Championship.
