= Étoile Sportive du Sahel H.C. =

Étoile Sportive du Sahel (Handball)
- Full name: Étoile Sportive du Sahel
- Founded: 1925 (1963)
- Arena: Sousse Indoor Sports Hall, Sousse, Tunisia
- Capacity: 5,000
- League: National A
- 2017–18: National A, 1st
- Club colours
Home	Away

Étoile Sportive du Sahel H.C (Arabic: النجم الرياضي الساحلي لكرة اليد, lit. 'Sport Star of Sahel Handball') is a Tunisian handball team based in Sousse, that plays in Tunisian Professional Handball League.

== Honours ==
=== National titles ===
- Tunisian Handball League 9
- Tunisian Handball Cup 7

=== International titles ===
African Handball Champions League 1 :

- (gold) Winners: 2010

(silver) Runners-up : 2011

African Handball Cup Winners' Cup 2 :

- (gold) Winners: 2012
- (gold) Winners: 2019

(bronze) Third : 2013

African Handball Super Cup 1 :

- (gold) Winners: 2013
- (silver) Runners-up : 2011

=== Regional titles ===
Arab Club Handball Championship 3 :

- (gold) Winners: 2001, 2004, 2015

Arab Handball Championship of Winners' Cup 3 :

- (gold) Winners: 2000, 2001, 2015
- (silver) Runners-up: 1996, 2002
- (bronze) Third: 1999

== Famous Former Players ==
- (Tunisia) Anouar Ayed
- (Tunisia) Marouen Maggaiz
- (Tunisia) Sobhi Saïed
- (Tunisia) Selim Hedoui
- (Tunisia) Abdelhak Ben Salah

== Managers ==
Nationality	Name	From	To	Honours
(Tunisia)	Mohamed Ben Salah	1964	1965	
(Tunisia)	Mohamed Ben Salah	1965	1966	
(Tunisia)	Mahmoud Methanni	1966	1967	
(Tunisia)	Mohamed Ben Salah	1967	1970	
(Tunisia)	Ezzeddine Ben Abdeljelil	1970	1972	
(Tunisia)	Slim Messaoud	1974	1975	
(Tunisia)	Kamel Fellah	1976	1977	
(Tunisia)	Taoufik Zalila	1977	1978	
(Tunisia)	Lotfi Laâbaied	1978	1979	
(Tunisia)	Sayed Ayari	1979	1981	
(Poland)	Ryszard Stutnik	1981	1983	
(Tunisia)	Sayed Ayari	1983	1985	
(Tunisia)	Hamadi Sayeh	1985	1986	
(Poland)	Stephen Wrzesniewski	1986	1989	1987-1988 Tunisian Handball League
(Tunisia)	Khaled Achour	1989	1991	1990-1991 Tunisian Handball Cup
(Russia)	Gregory Tchernich	1991	1994	
(Tunisia)	Hafedh Zouabi	1994	1995	
(Tunisia)	Khaled Achour	1995	1997	1995-1996 Tunisian Handball League; (silver) 1996 Arab Handball Championship of Winners' Cup
(Algeria)	Kamel Akkeb	1997	2006	1998-1999 Tunisian Handball League; (bronze) 1999 Arab Handball Championship of Winners' Cup; 1999-2000 Tunisian Handball Cup; (gold) 2000 Arab Handball Championship of Winners' Cup; (gold) 2001 Arab Handball Championship of Winners' Cup; (gold) 2001 Arab Handball Championship of Champions; 2001-2002 Tunisian Handball League; (silver) 2002 Arab Handball Championship of Winners' Cup; 2002-2003 Tunisian Handball League; (gold) 2004 Arab Handball Championship of Champions; 2005-2006 Tunisian Handball League
(Ukraine)	Nicolaï Stepenets	2006	2007	2006-2007 Tunisian Handball League
(Tunisia)	Sayed Ayari	2007	2008	2007-2008 Tunisian Handball Cup
(Algeria)	Moussa Tsabet	2008	2009	
(Algeria)	Kamel Akkeb	2009	2010	2008-2009 Tunisian Handball Cup; 2009-2010 Tunisian Handball Cup
(Tunisia)	Mohamed Moâtamri	2010	2011	2010 African Handball Champions League
(Tunisia)	Sami Saïdi	2011	30 August 2013	2010-2011 Tunisian Handball League; 2011 African Handball Super Cup; 2011 African Handball Champions League; 2012 African Handball Cup Winners' Cup; 2013 African Handball Cup Winners' Cup; 2013 African Handball Super Cup; 2013 IHF Super Globe Fourth Place
(Egypt)	Mamdouh Souleiman	6 September 2013	24 June 2014	2013-2014 Tunisian Handball League
(Tunisia)	Dhaker Sboui	1 July 2014	28 May 2016	(gold) 2015 Arab Handball Championship of Champions; (gold) 2015 Arab Handball Championship of Winners' Cup
(Tunisia)	Sami Saïdi	2 July 2016	16 June 2019	2016-2017 Tunisian Handball Cup; 2017-2018 Tunisian Handball League; 2019 African Handball Cup Winners' Cup
(Algeria)	Kamel Akkeb	16 June 2019	present	

== Presidents ==
N°	Country	Name	Years
1	(Tunisia)	Hamed Karoui	1963–1981
2	(Tunisia)	Abdeljelil Bouraoui	1981–1984
3	(Tunisia)	Hamadi Mestiri	1984–1988
4	(Tunisia)	Abdeljelil Bouraoui	1988–1990
5	(Tunisia)	Hamadi Mestiri	1990–1993
6	(Tunisia)	Othman Jenayah	1993–2006
7	(Tunisia)	Moez Driss	2006–2009
8	(Tunisia)	Hamed Kammoun	2009–2011
9	(Tunisia)	Hafedh Hmaied	2011–2012
10	(Tunisia)	Ridha Charfeddine	2012–2021
11	(Tunisia)	Maher Karoui	2021–present
