= 2014 African Handball Champions League =

Tournament details
- Host country: Tunisia
- Venue(s): 5 (in 1 host city)
- Dates: October 9–18
- Teams: 10 (from 1 confederation)

Final positions
- Champions: (Tunisia) Club Africain (1st title)
- Runner-up: (Egypt) Al Ahly
- Third place: (Tunisia) Espérance Tunis
- Fourth place: (Egypt) Alexandria Sporting Club

Tournament statistics
- Matches played: 33
- Goals scored: 1,673 (50.7 per match)

The 2014 African Handball Champions League was the 36th edition, organized by the African Handball Confederation, under the auspices of the International Handball Federation, the handball sport governing body. The tournament was held from October 9–18, 2014 in four venues: Salle Beni Khiar, Salle Hammamet, Salle Nabeul and Salle Zouaoui, in Tunis, Tunisia, contested by 10 teams and won by Club Africain of Tunisia.

Club African and Al Ahly qualified to the 2015 IHF Super Globe.

== Preliminary rounds ==
Times given below are in CET UTC+1.

=== Group A ===
Thu, 09 Oct 2014
Wydad Smara (Morocco)	27 (13:11) 23	(Democratic Republic of the Congo) Blessing
Club Africain (Tunisia)	41 (20:10) 23	(Republic of the Congo) Étoile du Congo
Fri, 10 Oct 2014
Étoile du Congo (Republic of the Congo)	17 (08:14) 35	(Egypt) Al Ahly
Club Africain (Tunisia)	38 (19:04) 15	(Democratic Republic of the Congo) Blessing
10 October, 2014
Wydad Smara (Morocco)	25 (12:15) 26	(Tunisia) Club Africain
Al Ahly (Egypt)	35 (21:09) 23	(Democratic Republic of the Congo) Blessing
Sat, 11 Oct 2014
Blessing (Democratic Republic of the Congo)	11 (06:13) 31	(Republic of the Congo) Étoile du Congo
Wydad Smara (Morocco)	19 (09:15) 30	(Egypt) Al Ahly
Mon, 13 Oct 2014
Wydad Smara (Morocco)	27 (14:07) 21	(Republic of the Congo) Étoile du Congo
Al Ahly (Egypt)	27 (13:15) 25	(Tunisia) Club Africain

Team	Pld	W	D	L	GF	GA	GDIF	Pts
(Egypt) Al Ahly	4	4	0	0	127	84	+43	8
(Tunisia) Club Africain	4	3	0	1	130	90	+40	6
(Morocco) Wydad Smara	4	2	0	2	98	100	-2	4
(Republic of the Congo) Étoile du Congo	4	1	0	3	92	114	-22	2
(Democratic Republic of the Congo) Blessing	4	0	0	4	72	131	-59	0

* Note: Advance to quarter-finals
Relegated to 9th place classification

=== Group B ===
Thu, 09 Oct 2014
JS Kinshasa (Democratic Republic of the Congo)	12 (09:13) 32	(Egypt) Alexandria Sporting Club
Espérance Tunis (Tunisia)	25 (10:11) 24	(Gabon) Stade Mandji
Fri, 10 Oct 2014
FAP Yaoundé (Cameroon)	21 (10:18) 29	(Egypt) Alexandria Sporting Club
JS Kinshasa (Democratic Republic of the Congo)	23 (10:18) 35	(Tunisia) Espérance Tunis
Sat, 11 Oct 2014
FAP Yaoundé (Cameroon)	26 (13:18) 29	(Gabon) Stade Mandji
Espérance Tunis (Tunisia)	25 (09:09) 22	(Egypt) Alexandria Sporting Club
Mon, 13 Oct 2014
FAP Yaoundé (Cameroon)	32 (13:19) 33	(Democratic Republic of the Congo) JS Kinshasa
Alexandria Sporting Club (Egypt)	43 (23:21) 42	(Gabon) Stade Mandji
Tue, 14 Oct 2014
Espérance Tunis (Tunisia)	35 (18:15) 22	(Cameroon) FAP Yaoundé
JS Kinshasa (Democratic Republic of the Congo)	30 (15:19) 31	(Gabon) Stade Mandji

Team	Pld	W	D	L	GF	GA	GDIF	Pts
(Tunisia) Espérance Tunis	4	4	0	0	120	91	+29	8
(Egypt) Alexandria Sporting Club	4	3	0	1	126	100	+26	6
(Gabon) Stade Mandji	4	2	0	2	126	124	+2	4
(Democratic Republic of the Congo) JS Kinshasa	4	1	0	3	98	130	-32	2
(Cameroon) FAP Yaoundé	4	0	0	4	101	126	-25	0

* Note: Advance to quarter-finals
Relegated to 9th place classification

== Knockout stage ==
Championship bracket

Quarter-finals
Thu 16 Oct 2014 – 14:00
(Egypt) Al Ahly	30
(Democratic Republic of the Congo) JS Kinshasa	23
Thu 16 Oct 2014 – 16:30
(Egypt) Alexandria Sporting Club	29
(Morocco) Wydad Smara	25
Thu 16 Oct 2014 – 19:00
(Tunisia) Club Africain	37
(Gabon) Stade Mandji	18
Thu 16 Oct 2014 – 19:00
(Tunisia) Espérance Tunis	42
(Republic of the Congo) Étoile du Congo	24

Semi-finals
Fri 17 Oct 2014 – 12:00
(Egypt) Al Ahly	25
(Egypt) Alexandria Sporting Club	23
Fri 17 Oct 2014 – 10:00
(Tunisia) Club Africain	28
(Tunisia) Espérance Tunis	23

Final
Sat 18 Oct 2014 – 11:00
(Egypt) Al Ahly	18
(Tunisia) Club Africain	24
Third place
Sat 18 Oct 2014 – 08:30
(Egypt) Alexandria Sporting Club	30
(Tunisia) Espérance Tunis	31

5-8th bracket

5–8th place
Fri 17 Oct 2014 – 12:00
(Democratic Republic of the Congo) JS Kinshasa	26
(Morocco) Wydad Smara	23
Fri 17 Oct 2014 – 10:00
(Gabon) Stade Mandji	34
(Republic of the Congo) Étoile du Congo	32

Fifth place
Sat 18 Oct 2014 – 11:00
(Democratic Republic of the Congo) JS Kinshasa	33
(Gabon) Stade Mandji	27
Seventh place
Sat 18 Oct 2014 – 08:30
(Morocco) Wydad Smara	29
(Republic of the Congo) Étoile du Congo	28

9th place

Semi-finals

Ninth place
Thu 16 Oct 2014 – 11:30
(Democratic Republic of the Congo) Blessing	26
(Cameroon) FAP Yaoundé	28
Third place

== Final standings ==
Rank	Team	Record
Gold medal	(Tunisia) Club Africain	6–1
Silver medal	(Egypt) Al Ahly	6–1
Bronze medal	(Tunisia) Espérance Tunis	6–1
4	(Egypt) Alexandria Sporting Club	4–3
5	(Democratic Republic of the Congo) J.S.K.	3–4
6	(Gabon) Stade Mandji	3–4
7	(Morocco) Wydad Smara	3–4
8	(Republic of the Congo) Étoile du Congo	1–6
9	(Cameroon) FAP Yaoundé	1–4
10	(Democratic Republic of the Congo) Blessing	0–5

* Note: Qualified to the 2015 IHF Super Globe

== Awards ==
2014 African Handball Champions League Winner

Club Africain
1st title

Most Valuable Player

== See also ==
2014 African Handball Cup Winners' Cup
