= Tunisian Women's Handball League =

- Founded: 1962
- No. of teams: 10
- Country: Tunisia
- Confederation: CAHB (Africa)
- Most recent champion: Club Africain (2024-25)
- Most titles: Club Africain (30 titles)
- Broadcasters: TV Tunisia 1, TV Tunisia 2
- Level on pyramid: 1
- Relegation to: National B
- International cups: Champions League; Cup Winners' Cup
- Website: federationhandball.tn
- 2025-26

The Tunisian Women's Handball League or the National Women's Handball A League is the Tunisian women's handball Top Division. The league started in 1963, it is Rule by The Tunisian Handball Federation. Club Africain is the dominant club with more than 30 titles record 17 of them are consecutive, Followed by ASF Sahel by 13 title and in third rank we find ASE Ariana by 7 titles, However The league serve as a Qualified Tournament to the African competitions such as Champions League and also the Cup Winners' Cup.

== Winners list ==
No.	Season	Champion
1	1962–63	Club Africain
2	1963–64	CA Gaz
3	1964–65	CS cheminots
4	1965–66	Zitouna Sports
5	1966–67	Club Africain
6	1967–68	Club Africain
7	1968–69	Club Africain
8	1969–70	Zitouna Sports
9	1970–71	Zitouna Sports
10	1971–72	Club Africain
11	1972–73	Club Africain
12	1973–74	Club Africain
13	1974–75	Club Africain
14	1975–76	Club Africain
15	1976–77	Club Africain
16	1977–78	Club Africain
17	1978–79	Club Africain
18	1979–80	Club Africain
19	1980–81	Club Africain
20	1981–82	Club Africain
21	1982–83	Club Africain
22	1983–84	Club Africain
23	1984–85	Club Africain
24	1985–86	Club Africain
25	1986–87	Club Africain
26	1987–88	Club Africain
27	1988–89	Zaoui Meubles Sports*
28	1989–90	Zaoui Meubles Sports*
29	1990–91	Zaoui Meubles Sports*
30	1991–92	Zaoui Meubles Sports*
31	1992–93	Club Africain

No.	Season	Champion
32	1993–94	Club Africain
33	1994–95	ASF Sahel
34	1995–96	ASF Sahel
35	1996–97	ASF Sahel
36	1997–98	ASE Ariana
37	1998–99	ASF Sahel
38	1999–00	ASF Sahel
39	2000–01	ASF Sahel
40	2001–02	ASE Ariana
41	2002–03	ASE Ariana
42	2003–04	ASF Sahel
43	2004–05	ASF Sahel
44	2005–06	ASE Ariana
45	2006–07	ASF Sfax
46	2007–08	ASE Ariana
47	2008–09	ASF Sfax
48	2009–10	ES Rejiche
49	2010–11	ES Rejiche
50	2011–12	ASF Sahel
51	2012–13	ASE Ariana
52	2013–14	ASE Ariana
53	2014–15	ASF Téboulba
54	2015–16	Club Africain
55	2016–17	Club Africain
56	2017–18	ASF Sfax
57	2018–19	Club Africain
58	2019–20	Club Africain
59	2020–21	Club Africain
60	2021–22	ASF Teboulba
61	2022–23	CSF Moknine
62	2023–24	Club Africain
63	2024–25	Club Africain

|-

== Most successful clubs ==
Rank	Club	Titles
1	Club Africian	30
2	ASF Sahel	13
3	ASE Ariana	7
4	Zitouna Sports	3
=	ASF Sfax	3
6	ES Rejiche	2
=	ASF Teboulba	2
8	CSF Moknine	1
=	CA Gaz	1
=	CS cheminots	1

- Notes: : ASF Sahel old name was Zaoui Meubles Sports

== See also ==
- Tunisian Handball League
- Tunisian Handball Cup
- Tunisian Women's Handball Cup
