= Club Africain (handball) =

Tunisian handball team

- Full name: Club Africain
- Nickname(s): CA; El Ghalia (الغالية); Bab Jedid's Team (فريق باب الجديد); Bab Jedid's Club (نادي باب الجديد)
- Founded: 4 October 1956
- Arena: Salle Chérif Bellamine
- Capacity: 2,500
- League: National A
- 2024–25: National A, 3rd
- Club colours
Home	Away

Club Africain (Arabic: النادي الافريقي, English: African Club) is a Tunisian handball team based in Capital Tunis, that plays in Tunisian Professional Handball League, founded on October 4, 1956. Its men's team is the second-most decorated club in Tunisia, behind Espérance Sportive de Tunis.

== History ==
Club Africain Handball was founded on October 4, 1956. The following year, the club earned promotion to Tunisia’s top division, thanks to the efforts of its pioneers, including Hédi Malek, Abdellatif and Hmid Dhib, Ridha Bachrouche, Mohamed Hédi Gueddana, Abdelaziz Driss, and Noureddine Ben Ammar. The club quickly established itself as one of the leading teams in Tunisian handball, winning six consecutive Tunisian Cups between 1964 and 1969, as well as three league titles in 1965, 1968, and 1970. However, it was subsequently overshadowed by its arch-rival, Espérance Sportive de Tunis, for more than two decades. Club Africain eventually returned to prominence, joining Espérance and Étoile Sportive du Sahel in shaping the domestic championship. The club won the Tunisian league title in 1965, 1868, 1970, 1986, 1987, 1989, 1990, 1998, 2000, 2001, 2008, 2015 and 2022. It also claimed the Tunisian Cup in 1964, 1965, 1966, 1967, 1968, 1969, 1987, 1988, 1989, 1996, 1997, 1998, 2001, 2003, 2004, 2007, 2011, 2015 and 2016. On the international stage, Club Africain won the Men's African Cup Winners' Cup five times, in 2001, 2004, 2005, 2007, and 2008. The club also won the African Handball Champions League in 2014.

== Honours ==
=== National titles ===
- Tunisian Handball League 13 :

Champions : 1964–65, 1967–68, 1969–70, 1985–86, 1986–87, 1988–89, 1989–90, 1997–98, 1999–2000, 2000–01, 2007–08, 2014–15, 2021-22

- Tunisian Handball Cup 19 :

Champions : 1963–64, 1964–65, 1965–66, 1966–67, 1967–68, 1968–69, 1986–87, 1987–88, 1988–89, 1995–96, 1996–97, 1997–98, 2000–01, 2002–03, 2003–04, 2006–07, 2010–11, 2014–15, 2015–16

=== International titles ===
- African Handball Champions League (1)

- Champions : 2014
- Runners Up : 2015

- African Handball Cup Winners' Cup (5)

- Champions : 2001, 2004, 2005, 2007, 2008

- African Handball Super Cup (1)

- Champions : 2015
- Runners Up : 2002, 2005, 2006

=== Regional titles ===
- Arab Handball Championship of Champions (2) :

Champions : 1986, 2012

- Arab Handball Championship of Winners' Cup (2) :

Champions : 1999, 2002
Runners Up : 2001

- Double

Winners (7): 1964–65, 1967–68, 1986–87, 1988–89, 1997–98, 2000–01, 2014–15

=== Worldwide ===
- Super Globe
  - Seventh-Place : 2015

== Team ==
=== Current squad ===
Club Africain Handball roster
Goalkeepers: 01 (Tunisia) MOUTII LIMAM (C); 16 (Tunisia) WAJDI AAGAL; 12 (Tunisia) Idriss Idrissi; Wingers: 10 (Tunisia) Aziz Lakha; 17 (Tunisia) Ghazi Ghribi; 21 (Tunisia) Anouar Ayed; 03 (Tunisia) Hamza Mhadhbi; Line players: 31 (Tunisia) Yousri Ghali; 14 (Tunisia) Makram Slama; 05 (Tunisia) Bilel Attig; 06 (Tunisia) Rami Hmam	Back players: 09 (Tunisia) Amine Bannour; 33 (Tunisia) Zoubayer Essaiess; 13 (Tunisia) Oussama Hosni; 07 (Tunisia) Ahmed Guizani; 19 (Tunisia) Mohamed Jilani Maaref; 25 (Tunisia) Abdelhak Ben Salah; 15 (Tunisia) Khaled Haj Youssef; 69 (Egypt) Islam Hassan; 39 (Tunisia) Mohamed Soussi; 99 (Tunisia) Ramzi Majdoub; 25 (Tunisia) Firas Jlizi	Technical staff: Head Coach (France) Stéphane Imbratta; Assistant Coach (Tunisia) Adel Hihi; Director (Tunisia) Raouf Hammami; Club doctor (Tunisia) Khélil Soua

=== Notable players ===
- (Tunisia) Oualid Ben Amor
- (Tunisia) Aymen Hammed
- (Tunisia) Hafedh Zouabi
- (Tunisia) Oussama Boughanmi
- (Tunisia) Amine Bannour
- (Tunisia) Abdelhak Ben Salah
- (Tunisia) Riadh Sanaa
- (Tunisia) Ali Madi
- (Tunisia) Rami Hmam

== See also ==
- Club Africain (football)
- Club Africain (basketball)
- Club Africain Women's Handball
