= Arab Handball Championship of Winners' Cup =

- Founded: 1996
- Country: Arab World
- Confederation: AHF
- Most recent champion: (Qatar) Al-Shamal SC (2020)
- Most titles: (Tunisia) ES Sahel HT (Egypt) Al Ahly SC (3 times)
- 2022 Arab Championship of CWC

The Arab Handball Championship of Club Winners' Cup also known Prince Faisal bin Fahd Handball Championship is an international club handball competition organized by the Arab Handball Federation, it concerne the club winners' cup of countries of the Arab World.

== Results ==
Year	Host	Final			Third place match		
Year	Host	Champion	Score	Second place	Third place	Score	Fourth place
1996; Details	(Tunisia); Mahdia	(Egypt); Al Ahly	^{n/a}	(Tunisia); ES Sahel	(Tunisia); EM Mahdia	^{n/a}	(Algeria); OC Alger
1997; Details	(Jordan); Amman	(Egypt); Al Ahly	–	(United Arab Emirates); Al Ahli Dubai	(Egypt); El-Olympi	–	
1999; Details	(Tunisia); Tunis	(Tunisia); Club Africain	–	(Saudi Arabia); Al-Khaleej Club	(Tunisia); ES Sahel	–	(Algeria); MC Oran
2000; Details	(Tunisia); Sousse	(Tunisia); ES Sahel	–	(Algeria); OC Alger	(Egypt); Al Ahly	–	(Qatar); Al Ahli SC
2001; Details	(Tunisia); Sousse	(Tunisia); ES Sahel	–	(Tunisia); Club Africain	(Algeria); MC Alger	–	
2002; Details	(Tunisia); Tunis	(Tunisia); Club Africain	–	(Tunisia); ES Sahel	(Qatar); Al Sadd	–	
2003; Details	(Morocco); Casablanca	(Morocco); AS Casablanca	25 – 19	(Kuwait); Al Salibikhaet SC	(Saudi Arabia); Al-Wehda Club	–	
2005; Details	(Morocco); Casablanca	(Saudi Arabia); Al-Ahli Jeddah	–	(Morocco); AS Casablanca	(Kuwait); Al Salibikhaet SC	–	(Algeria); US Biskra
2011; Details	(Saudi Arabia); Makkah	(Egypt); Al Ahly	28 – 27	(Saudi Arabia); Al-Wehda Club	(Saudi Arabia); Mudhar Club	33 – 29	(Morocco); AS Casablanca
2013; Details	(Morocco); Marrakesh	(Tunisia); ES Tunis	25 – 23	(Saudi Arabia); Al-Ahli Jeddah	(Tunisia); EM Mahdia	32 – 32 (5–4)	(Algeria); GS Pétroliers
2014; Details	(Tunisia); Mahdia	(Kuwait); Al-Qurain SC	27 – 25	(Tunisia); AS Teboulba	(Bahrain); Al-Najma	30 – 26	(Tunisia); EM Mahdia
2015; Details	(Morocco); Casablanca	(Tunisia); ES Sahel	26 – 20	(Bahrain); Al-Najma	(Bahrain); Barbar HC	30 – 30; 4 – 3	(Egypt); Heliopolis SC
2017; Details	(Tunisia); Hammamet	(Tunisia); CS Sakiet Ezzit	20 – 18	(Tunisia); AS Hammamet	(Iraq); Al-Shorta SC	36 – 26	(Algeria); CRB Baraki
2018; Details	(Tunisia); Sfax	(Qatar); Al-Gharafa HC	29 – 27	(Libya); Al-Ittihad Tripoli	(Tunisia); CS Sakiet Ezzit	28 – 26	(Saudi Arabia); Al-Ahli Jeddah
2020; Details	(Tunisia); Béni Khiar	(Qatar); Al-Shamal SC	33 – 31	(Qatar); Al Arabi SC	(Tunisia); Club Africain	40 – 31	(Saudi Arabia); Al-Khaleej Club
2022; Details	(Algeria); Oran		–			–	

^n/a A round-robin tournament determined the final standings.
MC Alger (ex. GS Pétroliers).

== Winners by club ==
Rank	Club	Winners	Runners-Up	Third	Total
1	(Tunisia) ES Sahel	3	2	1	6
2	(Egypt) Al Ahly	3	0	1	4
3	(Tunisia) Club Africain	2	1	1	4
4	(Saudi Arabia) Al-Ahli Jeddah	1	1	0	2
5	(Morocco) AS Casablanca	1	1	0	2
6	(Tunisia) CS Sakiet Ezzit	1	0	1	2
7	(Tunisia) ES Tunis	1	0	0	1
-	(Kuwait) Al-Qurain SC	1	0	0	1
-	(Qatar) Al-Gharafa HC	1	0	0	1
-	(Qatar) Al-Shamal SC	1	0	0	1
11	(Algeria) OC Alger	0	1	0	1
-	(Saudi Arabia) Al-Wehda Club	0	1	1	2
-	(Kuwait) Al Salibikhaet SC	0	1	1	2
-	(Bahrain) Al-Najma	0	1	1	2
15	(Tunisia) AS Teboulba	0	1	0	1
-	(Tunisia) AS Hammamet	0	1	0	1
-	(Saudi Arabia) Al-Khaleej Club	0	1	0	1
-	(United Arab Emirates) Al Ahli Dubai	0	1	0	1
-	(Libya) Al-Ittihad Tripoli	0	1	0	1
-	(Qatar) Al Arabi SC	0	1	0	1
21	(Tunisia) EM Mahdia	0	0	2	2
22	(Algeria) MC Alger	0	0	1	1
-	(Egypt) El-Olympi	0	0	1	1
-	(Qatar) Al Sadd	0	0	1	1
-	(Saudi Arabia) Mudhar Club	0	0	1	1
-	(Bahrain) Barbar HC	0	0	1	1
-	(Iraq) Al-Shorta SC	0	0	1	1

MC Alger (ex. GS Pétroliers).

== Winners by country ==
Rank	Nation	Winners	Runners-Up	Third	Total
1	Tunisia	7	5	5	17
2	Egypt	3	0	2	5
3	Qatar	2	1	1	4
4	Saudi Arabia	1	3	2	6
5	Kuwait	1	1	1	3
6	Morocco	1	1	0	2
7	Bahrain	0	1	2	3
8	Algeria	0	1	1	2
9	United Arab Emirates	0	1	0	1
-	Libya	0	1	0	1
11	Iraq	0	0	1	1

== See also ==
- Arab Handball Championship of Champions
- Arab Handball Super Cup
- Arab Women's Handball Championship of Champions
- Arab Women's Handball Championship of Winners' Cup
- Arab Women's Handball Super Cup
