= Rabii Bhouri =

Tunisian sports journalist

- Born: 12 November 1975 (age 50); Lille
- Occupations: Sports journalist, Television presenter

Rabii Bhouri ربيع البحوري (Arabic: ربيع البحوري) is a Tunisian sports journalist officiating at the Tunisian National Television. He is basketball commentator, reporter, producer and presenter. He graduated from the Institute of Press and Information Sciences of Tunis in 2001.

As a producer-presenter Rabii Bhouri produced and presented many sport's program as "sunday sport","sport mag","foot ball show","daily summaries of the African Cup of Nations", he also presented the sports section in the newscast 20h.

Rabii Bhouri commented various basketball events such as the 2012 Olympic games, the championship of Tunisia from 2003 to 2018, Arab nations championships 2008, 2009 and 2016 the African Champions League in 2013,2014 and 2017 (he got the award for Best Media Coverage in Championship African club champions in 2014), the Afro Basketball 2009,2015 and 2017, Arab Championship 2008 champions clubs, the 2013 Mediterranean games, Maghreb Championship Champion Clubs 2012, etc. Rabii Bhouri also was a reporter on the show "Sunday Sport" from 1999 to 2010.

Rabii Bhouri provided coverage of the Paralympic Summer Games 2008 in Beijing, the final of the Champion's league football in Africa in Abuja, Nigeria in 2004, the world championship of handball in Germany in 2007, the Arab Club Championship in Basketball in Egypt in 2009, Handball Africa cup of nations in Egypt 2016 etc....
