= Hafedh Zouabi =

Tunisian handball coach

Personal information
- Nationality: Tunisian
- Born: 7 February 1961 (age 65) Kairouan, Tunisia
- Height: 178 cm (70 in)

Sport
- Sport: Handball
- Current club: Club Africain (Manager)

Youth career
- Years: Team
- –: JS Kairouan

Senior clubs
- Years: Team
- 1982–1984: Club Africain

Teams managed
- 2000–2002: AS Hammamet
- 2001–2012: Jordan
- 2003-2005: Al Ahli SC (Qatar)
- 2005–2009: Club Africain
- 2009–2010: AS Hammamet
- 2009–2011: Tunisia (youth)
- 2012-2015: Al Ahli SC (Qatar)
- 2015–2016: Club Africain
- 2016–2017: Tunisia
- 2017–2018: Club Africain
- 2020–2021: Club Africain
- 2025–: Rwanda

Hafedh Zouabi (born 7 February 1961) is a Tunisian handball coach of the Tunisian national team.

== Biography ==
He joined from a young age the JS Kairouan with which he played in 1977 the final of the Tunisia Cup for cadets, before joining the senior team in 1980 and establishing himself in his first year as a goalscorer since he reached the final of the championship, notably scoring eleven goals in the semi-final.

It was not long before he was called up to the national team "B" then "A" in 1981. He won the university handball championship with the team from the National Sports Institute in passing and contested in 1982 the final of the cup of Tunisia.

In 1983–1984, he was recruited Club Africain with which he won several titles.

Armed with his physical education teacher and handball coaching diplomas, he devoted himself in 1990 to the coaching career and led numerous teams in Tunisia and abroad, including notably the Jordanian and Tunisian teams. He was responsible for preparing for the world tournament in Gdańsk (Poland) counting towards the qualifications for the 2016 Summer Olympics. In 2017 he was fired as the head coach of Tunisia after disappointing results at the 2017 World Men's Handball Championship.
