= Mamdouh Abouebaid =

Egyptian handball player

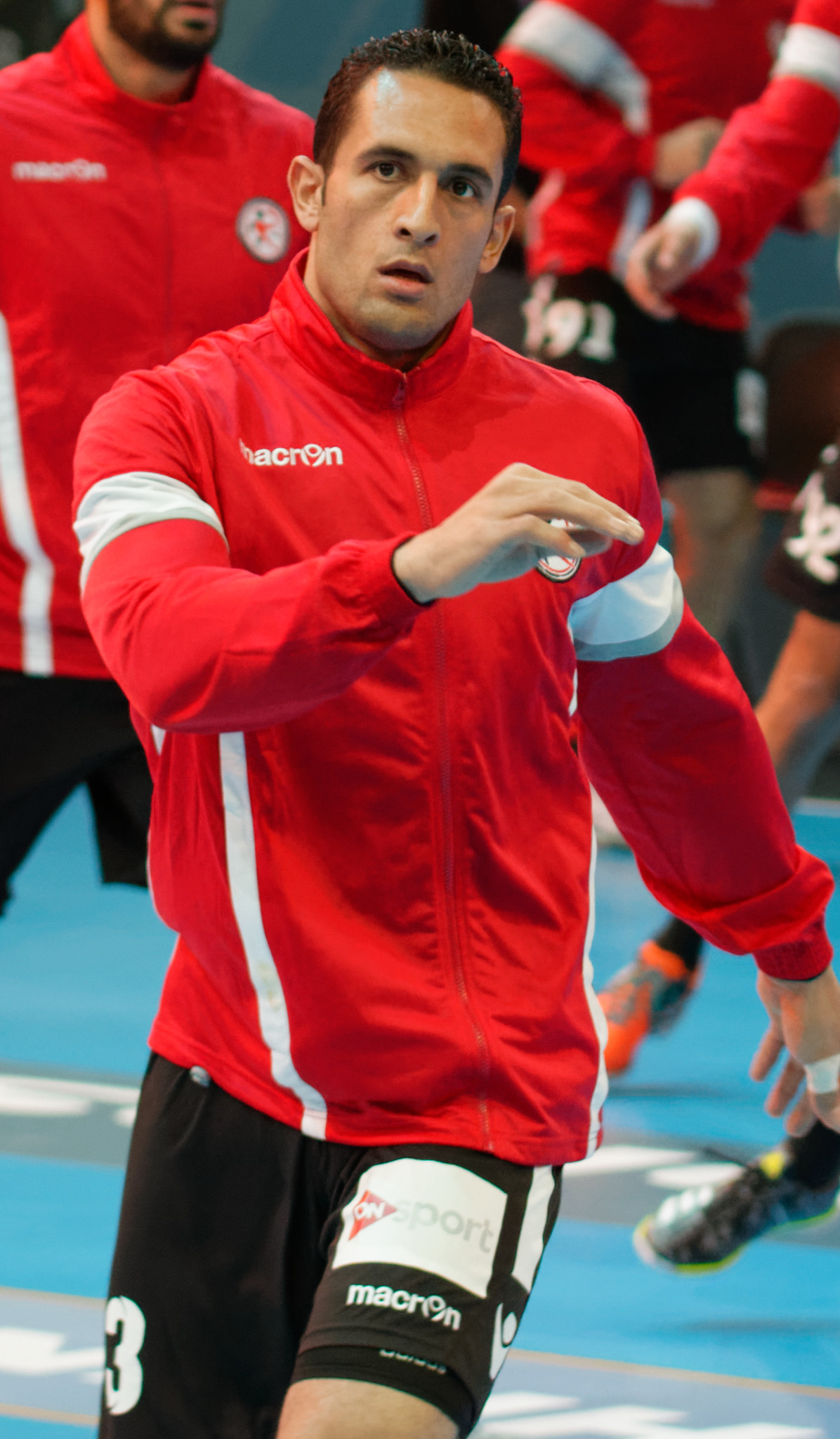

Personal information
- Full name: Mamdouh Taha Abouebaid
- Nationality: Egyptian
- Born: 1 January 1988 (age 38)
- Height: 1.87 m (6 ft 2 in)

Sport
- Sport: Handball
- Position: Right back
- Current club: Al Ahly
National team
| Years | Team | Apps | (Gls) |
| – | Egypt | 144 | (512) |
Medal record
Mediterranean Games
| Gold medal – first place | 2013 Mersin | Team |

Mamdouh Taha Al-Husseini Abouebaid (born 1 January 1988) is an Egyptian handball player for Al Ahly and the Egyptian national team.
