= Arab Women's Handball Championship of Champions =

- Founded: 1997
- Country: Arab World
- Confederation: AHF
- Most recent champion: (Algeria) HBC El Biar (2023)
- Most titles: (Algeria) MC Alger (3 title)
- 2025 Arab W-Championship of Champions

The Arab Women's Handball Championship of Champions is an international club handball competition organized by the Arab Handball Federation, it concerne the women's club Champions of countries of the Arab World.

== Results ==
Year	Host	Final			Third place match		
Year	Host	Champion	Score	Second place	Third place	Score	Fourth place
1997; Details	(Tunisia); Sousse	(Algeria); MC Alger	^{n/a}	(Tunisia); ASF Sahel	(Egypt); Smouha SC	^{n/a}	(Algeria); Nadit Alger
1998; Details	(Jordan); Amman	(Algeria); MC Alger	^{n/a}	(Tunisia); ASF Sahel		^{n/a}	
2019; Details	(Jordan); Amman	(Algeria); MC Alger	^{n/a}	(Jordan); Hartha SC	(Jordan); Amman SC	^{n/a}	
2021; Details	(Tunisia); Hammamet	(Tunisia); Club Africain	26 – 21	(Algeria); HBC El Biar	(Tunisia); Ezzahra Sports	–	
2022; Details	(Tunisia); Hammamet	(Tunisia); CSF Moknine	34 – 24	(Tunisia); ASF Mahdia	(Algeria); CNF Boumerdès	–	
2023; Details	(Tunisia); Mahdia	(Algeria); HBC El Biar	23 – 16	(Tunisia); Club Africain	(Saudi Arabia); Al-Ahli Jeddah	26 – 23	(Tunisia); ES Rejiche
2025; Details	(Tunisia); Hammamet / Grombalia		–			–	

^n/a A round-robin tournament determined the final standings.

== See also ==
- Arab Women's Handball Championship of Winners' Cup
- Arab Women's Handball Super Cup
- Arab Handball Championship of Champions
- Arab Handball Championship of Winners' Cup
- Arab Handball Super Cup
