= El Watania 2 =

Tunisian public television channel

Tunisia NAT 2
- Country: Tunisia
- Broadcast area: Tunisia
- Headquarters: Tunis, Tunisia

Programming
- Picture format: 576i (4:3 SDTV)

Ownership
- Owner: Télévision Tunisienne
- Sister channels: El Watania 1

History
- Launched: 12 June 1983; 43 years ago
- Replaced: Tunis 2 (1990–1994)
- Former names: RTT 2 (1983–1989); Tunis 2 (1990–1994); Canal 21 (1994–2007); Tunisie 21 (2007–2011); El Watania 2 (2011–present)

Links
- Website: www.watania2.tn

El Watania 2, also known as Télévision Tunisienne 2, is the second Tunisian public national television channel. It is owned and operated by Télévision Tunisienne (formerly ERTT). Formerly known as Canal 21 (1994–2007), then as Tunisie 21 (2007–2011), and as El Watania 2 since 2011. The television channel started broadcasting in its current form on November 7, 1994.

== History ==
The French, who wanted to set up the relay for the second ORTF channel in Tunisia in 1966, came up against the refusal of Tunisian officials. In 1969, ORTF officials agreed to finance the creation of a second French-speaking Tunisian channel, to fit out a studio at the RTT headquarters equipped with light technical means of transmission and to install four transmitters and repeaters around the capital, and in the north of the country. The project stumbled and the agreement was not signed until 1982.

The 25 December 1982 decree provided the creation within the direction of television of a sub-direction of the international channel which must “ensure the design, the programming, the production and the diffusion of the programs in French language”.

Officially launched on 12 June 1983 at 8:30pm with the national anthem, RTT 2 broadcast its programs daily between 8:30pm and 11pm (7pm to midnight on Saturdays and Sundays) from studio 12 of the RTT house. However, aside from its television news, the channel didn't have its own budget or means of production.

10% of Tunisian television's total budget allocated to it was primarily used to pay its staff. Added to this was unattractive programming. For lack of live and spontaneity, the managers of the second channel are forced to select programs from French public channels and TV5. A study carried out in 1988 credited RTT 2 with a weekly audience of 20%.

The channel disappeared in 1989 when its signal was transferred to the relays of the second French television channel, Antenne 2 (which became France 2 in 1992) until the end of October 1999, when Canal 21 (which since 1994 broadcasts daily on the same channel for more than two hours) obtained exclusive use of the network.

One year after the creation of the Arab Maghreb Union in 1989 and a few months after the disappearance of RTT 2 whose technical means were no longer used, it was decided to launch the Arab Maghreb Channel to mark the pro-Maghreb orientation from the Tunisian government.

Since the second UHF channel is now used for the broadcast of Antenne 2, the choice falls on the VHF channel used since August 1960 for the broadcast of Rai Uno programs in Tunisia. Thus, Italian broadcasts were interrupted on this VHF channel for almost three hours a day. They were not cut on the UHF frequencies covering the entire Tunisian territory.

Around 1993, faced with the stagnation of the Maghreb process and the low audience that the channel aroused (notably because its broadcasting territory was restricted to Tunis), the channel was renamed Tunis 2 and a more “Tunisian” orientation was adopted. However, the lineup still consisted mostly of reruns.

The channel disappeared on November 6, 1994, when Canal 21 was created; studio 12 used by Tunis 2 must be used for the production of programs for the new channel. The Tunis 2 and Rai Uno VHF channel is definitively abandoned on this date.

Aimed at the youth, the number 21 evoking the Youth Day held on March 21, it only broadcasts its programs between 5:40pm and 8:15pm instead of those of France 2 (in particular during the 8pm newscast deemed critical of the Tunisian government). Following President Ben Ali's triumphant re-election in 1999 (with over 99% of the vote), the French media, including France 2, strongly criticized the Tunisian government and punished the regime's lack of democracy.

In response, the latter summoned the ERTT to put an end to the broadcasting of the French channel, which was done at the end of October 1999. From that date, the second terrestrial network was entirely occupied by Canal 21 which broadcast from 4pm (later 2pm) to midnight. However, the channel is struggling to find its audience with an audience share not exceeding 5% because it faces strong competition from private national channels and other Arab channels broadcast by satellite. In addition, its distribution is exclusively terrestrial.

On July 25, 2007, Ben Ali announced in a speech the “conversion of the second national television channel Canal 21 into a satellite channel in a new form and with modern programming”.

The channel was effectively renamed Tunisie 21 on November 7 and began broadcasting on the satellite the same day. The broadcast takes place between noon and midnight while a new schedule and a new look for the channel are put in place. This satellite broadcast allows the channel to expand its audience.

In March 2010, Tunisie 21 moved into the new premises of Tunisian Television. After the fall of President Zine el-Abidine Ben Ali on January 14, 2011, on the occasion of the Tunisian revolution, the channel changed its name again on January 20 to National Tunisian Television 2 (التلفزة التونسية ـ الوطنية 2) in Arabic and Télévision Tunisienne 2 in French.

From January 2, 2012, the channel changed register and adopted programming devoted to the regions; its broadcast then covers 17 hours a day. From January 1, 2013, the channel switches to 24-hour broadcasting, but in the Night until 6:00 AM Tunisian time this channel rebroadcast of programmes from the sister station El Watania 1.

During the 2016 Olympic games in Rio de Janeiro, the channel had live broadcasts covering the games. These broadcasts included a daily program summarizing the main competitors and reporting on the athletes representing Tunisia, this was prepared by Rabii Bhouri and presented by Thouraya Majbri
