= Abdelhak Ben Salah =

Tunisian handball player (born 1990)

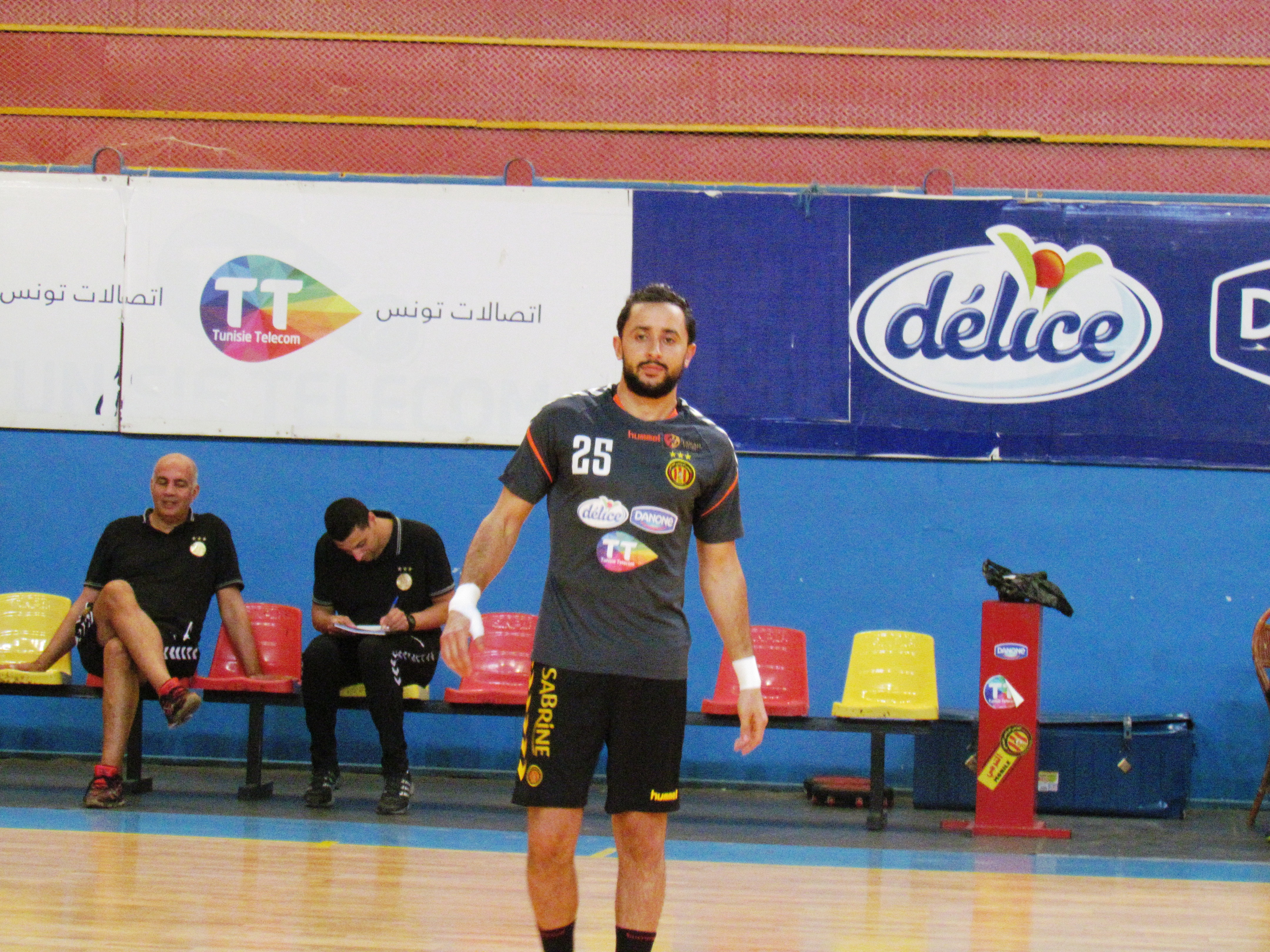
- Ben Salah with Esperance Sportive de Tunis

Personal information
- Nationality: Tunisian
- Born: 25 April 1990 (age 36) Sfax, Tunisia
- Height: 1.84 m (6 ft 0 in)

Sport
- Sport: Handball
- Position: Centre back
- Current club: Esperance

Senior clubs
- Years: Team
- –: JS Chihia
- –2014: ES Sahel
- 2013: → Club Africain
- 2013: → Al Sadd
- 2014–2017: Club Africain
- 2017: Esperance
National team
Years	Team	Apps	(Gls)
2011–	Tunisia	84	(170)
Medal record
African Championships
Bronze medal – third place	2024 Egypt
- Updated on 24 December 2024

Abdelhak Ben Salah (born 25 April 1990) is a Tunisian handball player for Esperance Sportive de Tunis and the Tunisian national team.

He participated in the 2015 World Men's Handball Championship.
