= Tunisian Handball League =

- Founded: 1954
- No. of teams: 12
- Country: Tunisia
- Confederation: CAHB (Africa)
- Most recent champion: Espérance de Tunis (2025–26)
- Most titles: Espérance de Tunis (38 titles)
- Broadcaster: Television Tunisienne 1
- Level on pyramid: 1
- Relegation to: National B
- International cups: Champions League; Cup Winners' Cup
- Website: federationhandball.tn
- 2025–26

The Tunisian Handball League or the National A is the top Tunisian professional handball. The league started in 1954, just after Tunisia had gained its independence. 12 teams participate in the league, which is the strongest in Africa. The Espérance Sportive de Tunis H.C is the most successful team, and the first team in the world to win a total of 38 titles in its national league, 15 of them consecutively. Club Africain H.C have won 13 titles. Both clubs focus on international competitions rather than the domestic league, however, since they make up the bulk of the national team.

== Winners list ==
| No. | Season | Champion |
|---|---|---|
| 1 | 1955–56 | Tunis University S.C (1) |
| 2 | 1956–57 | Tunis University S.C (2) |
| 3 | 1957–58 | USM Menzel Bourguiba (1) |
| 4 | 1958–59 | Force Sports Club (1) |
| 5 | 1959–60 | Force Sports Club (2) |
| 6 | 1960–61 | Tunisian United Club (1) |
| 7 | 1961–62 | PTT Sport Association (1) |
| 8 | 1962–63 | Al Mansoura Chaâbia Hammam-Lif (1) |
| 9 | 1963–64 | Club athlétique du Gaz (1) |
| 10 | 1964–65 | Club Africain (1) |
| 11 | 1965–66 | CS Hammam-Lif (1) |
| 12 | 1966–67 | Espérance de Tunis (1) |
| 13 | 1967–68 | Club Africain (2) |
| 14 | 1968–69 | Espérance de Tunis (2) |
| 15 | 1969–70 | Club Africain (3) |
| 16 | 1970–71 | Espérance de Tunis (3) |
| 17 | 1971–72 | Espérance de Tunis (4) |
| 18 | 1972–73 | Espérance de Tunis (5) |
| 19 | 1973–74 | Espérance de Tunis (6) |
| 20 | 1974–75 | Espérance de Tunis (7) |
| 21 | 1975–76 | Espérance de Tunis (8) |
| 22 | 1976–77 | Espérance de Tunis (9) |
| 23 | 1977–78 | Espérance de Tunis (10) |

| No. | Season | Champion |
|---|---|---|
| 24 | 1978–79 | Espérance de Tunis (11) |
| 25 | 1979–80 | Espérance de Tunis (12) |
| 26 | 1980–81 | Espérance de Tunis (13) |
| 27 | 1981–82 | Espérance de Tunis (14) |
| 28 | 1982–83 | Espérance de Tunis (15) |
| 29 | 1983–84 | Espérance de Tunis (16) |
| 30 | 1984–85 | Espérance de Tunis (17) |
| 31 | 1985–86 | Club Africain (4) |
| 32 | 1986–87 | Club Africain (5) |
| 33 | 1987–88 | Étoile du Sahel (1) |
| 34 | 1988–89 | Club Africain (6) |
| 35 | 1989–90 | Club Africain (7) |
| 36 | 1990–91 | Espérance de Tunis (18) |
| 37 | 1991–92 | Espérance de Tunis (19) |
| 38 | 1992–93 | Espérance de Tunis (20) |
| 39 | 1993–94 | El Makarem de Mahdia (1) |
| 40 | 1994–95 | Espérance de Tunis (21) |
| 41 | 1995–96 | Étoile du Sahel (2) |
| 42 | 1996–97 | Espérance de Tunis (22) |
| 43 | 1997–98 | Club Africain (8) |
| 44 | 1998–99 | Étoile du Sahel (3) |
| 45 | 1999–00 | Club Africain (9) |
| 46 | 2000–01 | Club Africain (10) |

| No. | Season | Champion |
|---|---|---|
| 47 | 2001–02 | Étoile du Sahel (4) |
| 48 | 2002–03 | Étoile du Sahel (5) |
| 49 | 2003–04 | Espérance de Tunis (23) |
| 50 | 2004–05 | Espérance de Tunis (24) |
| 51 | 2005–06 | Étoile du Sahel (6) |
| 52 | 2006–07 | Étoile du Sahel (7) |
| 53 | 2007–08 | Club Africain (11) |
| 54 | 2008–09 | Espérance de Tunis (25) |
| 55 | 2009–10 | Espérance de Tunis (26) |
| 56 | 2010–11 | Étoile du Sahel (8) |
| 57 | 2011–12 | Espérance de Tunis (27) |
| 58 | 2012–13 | Espérance de Tunis (28) |
| 59 | 2013–14 | Espérance de Tunis (29) |
| 60 | 2014–15 | Club Africain (12) |
| 61 | 2015–16 | Espérance de Tunis (30) |
| 62 | 2016–17 | Espérance de Tunis (31) |
| 63 | 2017–18 | Étoile du Sahel (9) |
| 64 | 2018–19 | Espérance de Tunis (32) |
| 65 | 2019–20 | Espérance de Tunis (33) |
| 66 | 2020–21 | Espérance de Tunis (34) |
| 67 | 2021–22 | Club Africain (13) |
| 68 | 2022–23 | Espérance de Tunis (35) |
| 69 | 2023–24 | Espérance de Tunis (36) |
| 70 | 2024–25 | Espérance de Tunis (37) |
| 71 | 2025–26 | Espérance de Tunis (38) |

== Most successful clubs ==
| Rank | Club | Titles |
|---|---|---|
| 1 | Espérance de Tunis | 38 |
| 2 | Club Africain | 13 |
| 3 | Étoile du Sahel | 9 |
| 4 | Tunis University S.C | 2 |
| 4 | Force Sports Club | 2 |
| 6 | USM Menzel Bourguiba | 1 |
| 6 | Tunisian United Club | 1 |
| 6 | PTT Sport Association | 1 |
| 6 | Al Mansoura Chaâbia (Hammam-Lif) | 1 |
| 6 | Club athlétique du gaz | 1 |
| 6 | CS Hammam-Lif | 1 |
| 6 | El Makarem de Mahdia | 1 |

== See also ==
- Tunisian Handball Cup
- Tunisian Women's Handball League
- Tunisian Women's Handball Cup
