= 2014 African Handball Cup Winners' Cup =

Tournament details
- Host country: Congo
- Venue(s): 2 (in 1 host city)
- Dates: 20–29 May 2014
- Teams: 7 (from 1 confederation)

Final positions
- Champions: (Tunisia) ES Tunis (3rd title)
- Runner-up: (Egypt) Al Ahly
- Third place: (Gabon) Salinas HC
- Fourth place: (Republic of the Congo) Patronage St Anne

Tournament statistics
- Matches played: 21

The 2014 African Handball Cup Winners' Cup was the 20th edition, organized by the African Handball Confederation, under the auspices of the International Handball Federation, the international handball sport governing body. The tournament was held from May 20–29, 2014 in Oyo, Republic of the Congo, contested by 7 teams and won by Espérance Sportive de Tunis of Tunisia.

== Results ==
Tue, 20 May 2014
ASPAC HC (Benin)	29 (16:14) 19	(Cameroon) Volcan
Salinas HC (Gabon)	30 (18:12) 24	(Republic of the Congo) Patronage
Wed, 21 May 2014
Al Ahly (Egypt)	28 (14:11) 24	(Cameroon) Volcan
ASPAC HC (Benin)	34 (16:17) 32	(Cameroon) FAP Yaoundé
ES Tunis (Tunisia)	37 (16:09) 23	(Gabon) Salinas HC
Thu, 22 May 2014
FAP Yaoundé (Cameroon)	29 (14:09) 31	(Republic of the Congo) Patronage
Fri, 23 May 2014
FAP Yaoundé (Cameroon)	21 (10:15) 33	(Cameroon) Volcan
Al Ahly (Egypt)	37 (19:11) 29	(Benin) ASPAC HC
Patronage (Republic of the Congo)	26 (11:14) 26	(Tunisia) ES Tunis
Sat, 24 May 2014
Salinas HC (Gabon)	34 (16:17) 26	(Benin) ASPAC HC
ES Tunis (Tunisia)	24 (13:11) 22	(Cameroon) Volcan
Patronage (Republic of the Congo)	23 (09:17) 34	(Egypt) Al Ahly
Mon, 26 May 2014
Volcan (Cameroon)	27 (11:14) 28	(Gabon) Salinas HC
ASPAC HC (Benin)	25 (11:21) 43	(Tunisia) ES Tunis
Al Ahly (Egypt)	28 (16:10) 18	(Cameroon) FAP Yaoundé
Tue, 27 May 2014
Volcan (Cameroon)	33 (15:19) 36	(Republic of the Congo) Patronage
ES Tunis (Tunisia)	35 (18:11) 23	(Cameroon) FAP Yaoundé
Salinas HC (Gabon)	30 (09:20) 37	(Egypt) Al Ahly
Thu, 29 May 2014
FAP Yaoundé (Cameroon)	25 (12:14) 31	(Gabon) Salinas HC
Patronage (Republic of the Congo)	28 (14:12) 28	(Benin) ASPAC HC
Al Ahly (Egypt)	24 (13:14) 26	(Tunisia) ES Tunis

P	Team	Pld	W	D	L	GF	GA	GDIF	Pts
Gold medal	(Tunisia) ES Tunis	6	5	1	0	191	143	+48	11
Silver medal	(Egypt) Al Ahly	6	5	0	1	188	150	+38	10
Bronze medal	(Gabon) Salinas HC	6	4	0	2	176	166	+10	8
4	(Republic of the Congo) Patronage	6	2	2	2	168	180	-12	6
5	(Benin) ASPAC HC	6	2	2	2	171	193	-22	6
6	(Cameroon) Volcan	6	1	1	4	158	166	-8	3
7	(Cameroon) FAP Yaoundé	6	0	0	6	148	192	-44	0

== Final standings ==
Rank	Team	Record
Gold medal	(Tunisia) Espérance Tunis	5–0
Silver medal	(Egypt) Al Ahly	5–1
Bronze medal	(Gabon) Salinas HC	4–2
4	(Republic of the Congo) Patronage St Anne	2–2
5	(Benin) ASPAC HC	2–2
6	(Cameroon) Volcan de Yaoundé	1–4
7	(Cameroon) FAP Yaoundé	3–5

== Awards ==
2014 African Handball Cup Winner's Cup Winner

Espérance Sportive de Tunis
2nd title

Best player
