= Rabita de Casablanca =

- Full name: Alliance Sportive de Casablanca
- Nickname: ASC Rabita
- Founded: 1977
- Arena: Salle Mohammed V, Casablanca, Morocco
- Capacity: 10,000
- League: Division A
- 2011–12: Division A, 1ST
- Club colours
Home	Away

Alliance Sportive de Casablanca or Rabita de Casablanca (Arabic: الرابطة الرياضية البيضاوية), is a Moroccan handball team based in Casablanca, that plays in Moroccan Handball League.

== Honours ==
=== National titles ===
- Moroccan Handball League 12 :

Champions : 1985–86, 1986–87, 1987–88, 1990–91, 2001–02, 2002–03, 2003–04, 2004–05, 2006–07, 2007–08, 2008–09, 2009–10.

- Moroccan Handball Cup 12 :

Champions : 1983–84, 1984–85, 1986–87, 1987–88, 1998–99, 2000–01, 2002–03, 2003–04, 2004–05, 2005–06, 2007–08, 2009–10

=== International titles ===
- African Handball Cup Winners' Cup :

Runners-up :

- Arab Handball Championship of Champions :

Champions :
Runners-up :

- Arab Handball Championship of Winners' Cup :

Champions :
