= 2016 Handball League Australia =

Handball League Australia
- Season: 1
- Champion: Sydney University
- Matches played: 12
- Goals scored: 585 (48.75 per match)
- Top goalscorer: Viktor Bruhn (28)
- Biggest home win: Sydney - Hawks; 38 - 20
- Biggest away win: Wolves - Kilda; 20 - 32
- Highest scoring: Wolves - Hawks; 28 - 38 (66)
- Longest winning run: Sydney University 6
- Longest unbeaten run: Sydney University 6
- Longest winless run: Brisbane Wolves 6
- Longest losing run: Brisbane Wolves 6
- All statistics correct as of 2017-12-07.

The 2016 Handball League Australia was the first round robin handball league in Australia. The principal idea was to play round robin games in each capital city. There are four teams representing four states.

The inaugural competition was won by current Australian and Oceania champions Sydney University Handball Club.

== Calendar ==
Date	Host city	Tournament
2–3 June 2016	Geelong, Victoria	Oceania Champions Cup & Australian Handball Club Championship
2–4 September 2016	Canberra, Australian Capital Territory	Handball League Australia
~~November 2016~~	~~Brisbane, Queensland~~	~~Handball League Australia~~ Cancelled
10–11 December 2016	Sydney, New South Wales	Handball League Australia Finals

== Franchises ==
Location of teams in the 2016 Australian Handball League

Legend:

BW – Brisbane Wolves
Hks – UTS-UC Hawks Handball Club
SK – Saint Kilda Handball Club
SU – Sydney University

Team	Qualification
(New South Wales) Sydney University Handball Club	Current Oceania, Australian & New South Wales Champion's
(New South Wales) (Australian Capital Territory) UTS-UC Hawks Handball Club	Combined University of Technology Sydney & University of Canberra
(Queensland) Brisbane Wolves	Combined from University of Queensland, Northern Panthers & Logan Wizards
(Victoria (state)) Saint Kilda Handball Club	Victorian Champion

== Results ==
=== Table ===
Team	Pld	W	D	L	GF	GA	GD	Pts
(New South Wales) Sydney University	6	6	0	0	174	103	+71	12
(New South Wales) (Australian Capital Territory) Hawks HC	6	3	1	2	153	162	−9	7
(Victoria (state)) St Kilda HBC	6	2	1	3	143	138	+5	5
(Queensland) Brisbane Wolves	6	0	0	6	115	182	−67	0

=== Round 1 – Geelong (Victoria) ===
2 June 2016; 10:50	Sydney University	38–20	Hawks HC	Corio Leisuretime Center, Geelong; Referees: Freya Brent, Jessica Fearnside
2 June 2016; 10:50		Report		Corio Leisuretime Center, Geelong; Referees: Freya Brent, Jessica Fearnside

2 June 2016; 13:10	Brisbane Wolves	20–32	St Kilda HBC	Corio Leisuretime Center, Geelong; Referees: Kiki Lange, Daniela Diedrich
2 June 2016; 13:10		Report		Corio Leisuretime Center, Geelong; Referees: Kiki Lange, Daniela Diedrich

3 June 2016; 14:20	Sydney University	18–17	St Kilda HBC	Corio Leisuretime Center, Geelong
3 June 2016; 14:20		Report		Corio Leisuretime Center, Geelong

=== Round 2 – Canberra (ACT) ===
2 September 2016; 17:30	Sydney University	29–19	Hawks HC	Australian Institute of Sport
2 September 2016; 17:30	Joan Cornella 9	(12–8)	Karl Warrerner 5	Australian Institute of Sport
2 September 2016; 17:30		Report		Australian Institute of Sport

3 September 2016; 12:00	Sydney University	30–11	Brisbane Wolves	Australian Institute of Sport
3 September 2016; 12:00	Luka Krajnc 7	(14–5)	Hamish Langenberg 4	Australian Institute of Sport
3 September 2016; 12:00		Report		Australian Institute of Sport

3 September 2016; 14:00	St Kilda HBC	22–22	Hawks HC	Australian Institute of Sport
3 September 2016; 14:00	Fabien Guillard 6	(14–9)	Karl Warrerner 5	Australian Institute of Sport
3 September 2016; 14:00		Report		Australian Institute of Sport

3 September 2016; 19:00	St Kilda HBC	26–21	Brisbane Wolves	Australian Institute of Sport
3 September 2016; 19:00	2 players 4	(12–9)	Scott Marshall 6	Australian Institute of Sport
3 September 2016; 19:00		Report		Australian Institute of Sport

4 September 2016; 11:00	Hawks HC	24–20	Brisbane Wolves	Australian Institute of Sport
4 September 2016; 11:00	Agustin Bruno 7	(12–6)	2 players 4	Australian Institute of Sport
4 September 2016; 11:00		Report		Australian Institute of Sport

=== Round 3 – Brisbane (QLD) ===
Cancelled

=== Round 4 – Sydney (NSW) ===
10 December 2016; 11:30	Sydney University	32-15	Brisbane Wolves	Sydney University Sports & Aquatic Centre
10 December 2016; 11:30	Joan Cornella 7	(19-6)	Caleb Gahan 6	Sydney University Sports & Aquatic Centre
10 December 2016; 11:30		Report		Sydney University Sports & Aquatic Centre

10 December 2016; 16:00	Sydney University	27-21	St Kilda HBC	Sydney University Sports & Aquatic Centre
10 December 2016; 16:00	Tomasz Szklarski 7	(16-11)	Pedro De Xavier Pinto 7	Sydney University Sports & Aquatic Centre
10 December 2016; 16:00		Report		Sydney University Sports & Aquatic Centre

10 December 2016; 18:00	Brisbane Wolves	28-38	Hawks HC	Sydney University Sports & Aquatic Centre
10 December 2016; 18:00	Scott Marshall 8	(10-19)	Viktor Bruhn 12	Sydney University Sports & Aquatic Centre
10 December 2016; 18:00		Report		Sydney University Sports & Aquatic Centre

11 December 2016; 13:30	St Kilda HBC	25-30	Hawks HC	Sydney University Sports & Aquatic Centre
11 December 2016; 13:30		(19-17)		Sydney University Sports & Aquatic Centre
11 December 2016; 13:30		Report		Sydney University Sports & Aquatic Centre

== Top goalscorers ==
Rank	Name	Team	Goals
1	(Sweden) Viktor Bruhn	(New South Wales) (Australian Capital Territory) Hawks HC	28
2	(Brazil) Alexandre Niyama	(Victoria (state)) St Kilda HBC	27
3	(Australia) Scott Marshall	(Queensland) Brisbane Wolves	24
4	(Spain) Joan Cornellà	(New South Wales) Sydney University	21
5	(France) Fabien Guillard	(Victoria (state)) St Kilda HBC	20
6	(Australia) Caleb Gahan	(New South Wales) Sydney University (Queensland) Brisbane Wolves	19
7	(Australia) Robert Ridley	(New South Wales) (Australian Capital Territory) Hawks HC	18
8	(France) Pierre Bonnin	(New South Wales) Sydney University	17
8	(Netherlands) Daan Versleeuwen	(New South Wales) Sydney University	17
8	(Australia) Tomasz Szklarski	(New South Wales) Sydney University	17
