= Queensland Handball League =

Australian handball league

The Queensland Handball League is a Brisbane based championship for handball. The Queensland Handball Association was incorporated in 1983 and the competition has been running for most years since then. The winner of this league qualifies for the Australian Handball Club Championship which is a qualifying event for the Oceania Handball Champions Cup.

== Winners ==
Both men's & women's trophies

Year	Men's	Women's	Junior Boys	Youth Boys	Junior Girls	Youth Girls
1983 - 2010	Confirmed information unavailable					
2011	University of Queensland	no competition				
2012	Logan Wizards	Logan Wizards	no competition			
2013	Northern Panthers	Northern Panthers	no competition			
2014	University of Queensland	no competition	North Brisbane Panther Cubs			
2015	Northern Panthers	Northern Panthers	North Brisbane Panther Cubs		North Brisbane Pink Panthers	
2016	no competition		St Patrick's College	Brisbane State High School	Brisbane State High School Yellow	
2017	unknown		St Patrick's College	Cavendish Road State High School	Brisbane State High School	
2018	unknown		Redeemer Lutheran College		Cavendish Road State High School	
2019	TBA		Cavendish Road State High School	Redlands College	Brisbane State High School	

== See also ==
- Australian Handball Federation
- Handball League Australia
