= UTS Sport =

- University: University of Technology Sydney
- UniSport: Division 1 and Division 2
- Location: Sydney, New South Wales
- Colors: Robin egg blue and White
- Website: activateuts.com.au/sport/intervarsity-sport

The UTS Sport are the athletic teams that represent the University of Technology Sydney, located in Sydney, New South Wales, Australia. They compete at all events of UniSport.

== Sports sponsored ==
Men's sports	Women's sports	Mixed sports	Open sports
Division 1
Australian Rules Football			
			Baseball
	Basketball		
Beach Volleyball			
Cycling			
Fencing			
Football			
Futsal			
		Handball	
Judo			
Kendo			
			Lawn Bowls
	Netball		
Rugby 7's			
			Sailing
	Softball		
Squash			
Table Tennis			
Taekwondo			
Tennis			
			Tenpin
Touch Football			
Ultimate			
Volleyball			
Water polo			
Division 2
Badminton			
Basketball			
Standalone Championships
3x3 Basketball
Athletics
Distance Running
League of Legends
Orienteering
Rowing
Surfing
Swimming
T20 Cricket
Taekwondo
Triathlon
Indigenous Nationals
Nationals Snow

=== Australian rules football ===
The UTS Australian Football Club is an Australian rules football club that competes in the AFL Sydney competition. Founded in 2000, the club have won nine Division 1 premierships, including one by the women's team in 2016. The club plays its home games at the Trumper Park Oval in Paddington, an inner city suburb of Sydney.

=== Cricket ===
The UTS North Sydney District Cricket Club was founded in 1858 and is one of Australia's oldest cricket clubs. It competes in the NSW Premier Cricket competition, and has won five first grade premierships. The club's home ground is located at the North Sydney Oval, where it has played since its foundation. Its notable past players include Don Bradman, Bill O'Reilly and Stan McCabe.

=== Handball ===
For the Handball League Australia they did a joint venture with University of Canberra. They were called UTS-UC Hawks Handball Club. At the Australian Handball Club Championship won the men two silver and one bronze medal and the women's one silver and two bronze medals. The men's won two silver medal and one bronze medal at the Oceania Handball Champions Cup. The women's won one bronze medal at the Oceania Women's Handball Champions Cup.

They are the most successful team at the UniSport Division 1 Handball Nationals with 3 titles and in total 6 medals. They have also won 1 title and a bronze medal in the UniSport Division 2 Handball Nationals.

=== Netball ===
The UTS Randwick Sparks (formerly UTS St George Sparks) is a netball club that competes in the Netball NSW Premier League. It was formed through a partnership between the University of Technology Sydney and the Randwick Netball Association. The Under-23s team have won two premierships (2017, 2020) and were runners up in 2016.

=== Rowing ===
The UTS Haberfield Rowing Club is a rowing club located at Dobroyd Point, in the Inner West of Sydney. Since 2014, the club have shared its clubhouse with St Catherine's School, Waverley, as their in-house school partner. The club has produced 42 Olympians, including 16 Olympic medallists. Its notable past rowers include Stuart Welch, Victoria Roberts and James Chapman.

=== Track and field ===
The UTS Northern Suburbs Athletic Club is one of Australia's largest athletic clubs. Founded in 1927, the club has produced 11 Olympians and 12 Commonwealth Games representatives throughout its history. The club's athletics tracks are located at the Rotary Athletics Field in Lane Cove North, on the Lower North Shore of Sydney.

=== Water polo ===
The UTS Balmain Water Polo Club, founded in 1884, is Australia's oldest water polo club. The club has produced 21 Olympians throughout its history, including multiple Olympic medallists. Its notable past players include Bronwyn Mayer, Taryn Woods and Rowena Webster.

== UniSport ==
=== UniSport Nationals ===
UTS were the overall champion on two occasions (2016, 2017), and were awarded the Spirit of the Games Shield (now known as the John White Spirit Trophy) on one occasion in 1995.

Sport	Division	Gender	Gold	Silver	Bronze	Total
Athletics	Division 1	Men	0	0	1	1
Badminton	Division 1	Men	0	0	1	1
Badminton	Division 1	Women	1	1	0	2
Cross Country	Division 1	Overall	0	1	0	1
Soccer	Division 1	Men	0	1	0	1
Handball	Division 1	Mixed	3	2	1	6
Handball	Division 2	Mixed	1	0	1	2
Kendo	Division 1	Overall	1	0	1	2
Netball	Division 1	Mixed	1	1	1	3
Rowing	Division 1	Overall	1	1	1	3
Rowing	Division 1	Men's Eight	3	1	2	6
Rowing	Division 1	Women's Eight	1	0	1	2
Rugby Union 7's	Division 1	Men	1	0	0	1
Softball	Division 1	?	0	0	1	1
Tennis	Division 1	Women	1	1	2	4
Touch Football	Division 1	Men	1	1	0	2
Touch Football	Division 1	Women	0	1	0	1
Water Polo	Division 1	Women	0	0	2	2

=== Standalone National Championships ===
==== T20 Cricket ====
UTS have won the Nationals T20 Cricket on three occasions (2014, 2018, 2022).

==== Futsal ====
UTS were the overall champion at the Nationals Futsal Championships in 2023, with both men's and women's team finishing first in their respective rankings.

=== Nationals Snow ===
UTS were the overall champion at the Nationals Snow on two occasions (2022, 2023), and were awarded the Spirit of the Mountain Trophy twice, in 2019 and 2023.

=== Indigenous Nationals ===
UTS were overall champion of the Indigenous Nationals on two occasions (2003, 2019).
