= 2016 Queensland Handball League =

Seasons
- ← 2015 2017 →

The 2016 Queensland Handball League is a Brisbane based championship for Handball. It is a home and away structure conducted in April to July 2016, with the winning team qualifying for the National Club Championship. The competition was not held due to a combined Queensland team called the Brisbane Wolves competing in the 2016 Australian Handball Club Championship, 2016 Oceania Handball Champions Cup and the 2016 Australian Handball League.

The North Brisbane Pre-Season Competition was held in February and was a mixed male and female teams competition (similar to University Games rules) which was won by the Panthers Green team.

The Junior competition was run by Northern Panthers Handball Association and held during the second school term (April–June 2016) for the third season and featured three mixed boys and girls teams, won by North Brisbane.

The inaugural Brisbane Schools Handball Championship was held at Brisbane State High School with over one hundred participants in three sections. The Junior Boys was won by St Patrick's College, Shorncliffe after defeating Brisbane State High School 1. Mt Gravatt High School were third. The Junior Girls saw Brisbane State High School Yellow win. The Youth Boys was a tie between the two Brisbane State High School teams.

== Standings ==
=== Brisbane Schools Championship ===
==== Junior Boys ====
Team	Pld	W	D	L	GF	GA	GD	Pts
St Patrick's College	3	2	0	1	36	20	+16	4
Brisbane State High School 1	3	2	0	1	40	31	+9	4
Mt Gravatt High School	3	2	0	1	29	22	+7	4
Brisbane State High School 2	3	0	0	3	16	48	−32	0

Final

16 October 2016; 13:30	St Patrick's College	9 - 8	Brisbane State High School 1	Brisbane State High School
16 October 2016; 13:30		(5 - 4)		Brisbane State High School

==== Junior Girls ====
Team	Pld	W	D	L	GF	GA	GD	Pts
Brisbane State High School Yellow	2	2	0	0	18	13	+5	4
Brisbane State High School Blue	2	1	0	1	18	15	+3	2
Brisbane State High School Maroon	2	0	0	2	10	18	−8	0

Final

16 October 2016; 14:15	Brisbane State High School Yellow	9 - 7	Brisbane State High School Blue	Brisbane State High School
16 October 2016; 14:15		(5 - 2)		Brisbane State High School

==== Youth Boys ====
Team 1	Agg.	Team 2	1st leg	2nd leg
Brisbane State High School 1	15-15	Brisbane State High School 2	7-7	8-8

=== North Brisbane Pre-Season Competition ===
Team	Pld	W	D	L	GF	GA	GD	Pts
Panthers Green	2	2	0	0	-	-	—	4
Panthers Youth	2	1	0	1	-	-	—	2
Panthers Orange	2	0	0	2	-	-	—	0

=== North Brisbane Junior Competition ===
Team	Pld	W	D	L	GF	GA	GD	Pts
North Brisbane Panther Cubs	4	2	1	1	-	-	—	5
Brisbane City United	4	1	1	2	-	-	—	3
South Brisbane Jesters	4	1	0	3	-	-	—	2
