= 2014 Queensland Handball League season =

Australian handball league season

2014 Queensland Handball League

Seasons
- ← 2013 2015 →

The 2014 Queensland Handball League is a Brisbane based championship for Handball. It is a home and away structure conducted in March to May 2014, with the winning team qualifying for the National Club Championship.

The University of Queensland Firsts team won the competition from the University of Queensland Seconds team. The defending champions Logan Wizards came third. 2013 runners up Northern Panthers were fourth with Griffith Vikings fifth.

The Junior competition was run by Northern Panthers Handball Association and featured three mixed boys and girls teams won by North Brisbane.

== Standings ==
=== Men's Open ===
Team	Pld	W	D	L	GF	GA	GD	Pts
University of Queensland 1	8	7	0	1	206	113	+93	14
University of Queensland 2	8	6	0	2	253	170	+83	12
Logan Wizards	8	5	0	3	226	163	+63	10
Northern Panthers	8	2	0	6	200	213	−13	4
Griffith Vikings	8	0	0	8	57	288	−231	0

=== Northern University Games - Mixed ===
Team	Pld	W	D	L	GF	GA	GD	Pts
Griffith 1	8	8	0	0	184	104	+80	16
QUT 1	8	4	0	4	142	125	+17	8
Griffith 2	8	0	0	8	78	175	−97	0

=== Junior Mixed ===
Team	Pld	W	D	L	GF	GA	GD	Pts
North Brisbane Panther Cubs	18	11	1	6	139	131	+8	23
South Brisbane Jesters	18	8	0	10	120	102	+18	16
The Gap Goats	18	7	1	10	126	138	−12	15
