= 2015 Australian Handball Club Championship =

Handball competition in Australia

The 2015 Australian Handball Club Championship is split into two parts. The first was the Beach Handball competition held in Glenelg, South Australia during February 2015 and the second is the Indoor titles which was held in March, 2015. Both were organised by the Australian Handball Federation and featured teams from New South Wales, Victoria, Queensland, Northern Territory, Australian Capital Territory, South Australia and hosts Western Australia.

The Beach tournament was split into Men's, Women's and Mixed. The men's title was won by the St Kilda from Victoria. The women's event was won by RUOK from Queensland and the mixed event was won by Spinners from New South Wales.

The Indoor tournament was split into two divisions. The Northern Division was won by Sydney University and the Southern Division by St Kilda HC. They won the right to represent Australia in the Oceania Handball Champions Cup.

== Beach results ==
=== Men's final ===
7 February 2015; 12:20	(Victoria (state)) St Kilda HC	2 legs 0	(Victoria (state)) East Melbourne Spartans	Glenelg Beach

=== Women's final ===
7 February 2015; 13:20	(Queensland) RUOK	2 legs 0	(New South Wales) S. Betta	Glenelg Beach

=== Mixed final ===
7 February 2015; 11:30	(New South Wales) Spinners	2 legs 0	(New South Wales) S.Betta	Glenelg Beach

== Men's indoor results ==
=== Northern conference ===
==== Round Robin ====
Team	Pld	W	D	L	GF	GA	GD	Pts
Sydney University	3	3	0	0	99	38	+61	6
Canberra HC	3	2	0	1	62	71	−9	4
University of Queensland HC	3	1	0	2	61	80	−19	2
Logan Wizards	3	0	0	3	48	81	−33	0

28 March 2015; 11:30	(New South Wales) Sydney University	28 - 15	(Australian Capital Territory) Canberra HC	All Sorts Sports Centre, Sydney
28 March 2015; 11:30		(14 - 5)		All Sorts Sports Centre, Sydney

13:30	Uni of Queensland HC	25 - 19	(Queensland) Logan Wizards	All Sorts Sports Centre, Sydney
13:30		(12 - 9)		All Sorts Sports Centre, Sydney

18:30	(New South Wales) Sydney University	38 - 14	Uni of Queensland HC	All Sorts Sports Centre, Sydney
18:30		(20 - 2)		All Sorts Sports Centre, Sydney

20:30	(Australian Capital Territory) Canberra HC	24 - 20	(Queensland) Logan Wizards	All Sorts Sports Centre, Sydney
20:30		(13 - 9)		All Sorts Sports Centre, Sydney

29 March 2015; 12:30	(New South Wales) Sydney University	32 - 9	(Queensland) Logan Wizards	All Sorts Sports Centre, Sydney
29 March 2015; 12:30		(16 - 4)		All Sorts Sports Centre, Sydney

14:30	(Australian Capital Territory) Canberra HC	23 - 22	Uni of Queensland HC	All Sorts Sports Centre, Sydney
14:30		(15 - 10)		All Sorts Sports Centre, Sydney

=== Southern Conference ===
1. St Kilda Handball Club (results to follow)

=== Final ===
7 June 2015; 11:00	(Australia) St Kilda HC	16 – 24	(Australia) Sydney University	Sydney Olympic Park
7 June 2015; 11:00		(10 - 11)		Sydney Olympic Park

8 June 2015; 13:00	(Australia) Sydney University	23 - 16	(Australia) St Kilda HC	Sydney Olympic Park; Referees: Ridley, Ridley (AUS)
8 June 2015; 13:00		(13 - 7)		Sydney Olympic Park; Referees: Ridley, Ridley (AUS)
