= 2017 Handball League Australia =

Handball League Australia
- Season: 2
- Champion: Saint Kilda Handball Club
- Matches played: 12 + 4 = 16
- Goals scored: 867
- Average goals/game: 54.19
- Longest winning run: Sydney University 7
- Longest unbeaten run: Sydney University 7
- Longest winless run: Brisbane Wolves 8
- Longest losing run: Brisbane Wolves 8
- All statistics correct as of 2018-07-06.

The 2017 Australian Handball League is the second season round robin handball league in Australia. The principal idea was to play round robin games in each capital city. There are four teams representing four states.

== Calendar ==
Date	Host city	Tournament
May 2017	Geelong, Victoria	Oceania Champions Cup & Australian Handball Club Championship
July 2017	Gold Coast, Queensland	Handball League Australia
~~TBA~~	~~Canberra, Australian Capital Territory~~	~~Handball League Australia~~ Cancelled
November 18, 19	Sydney, New South Wales	Handball League Australia Finals

== Franchises ==
Location of teams in the 2017 Australian Handball League

Legend:

BW – Brisbane Wolves
Hks – UTS/UC Hawks
SK – St Kilda HC
SU – Sydney University

Team	Qualification
(New South Wales) Sydney University Handball Club	Current Oceania, Australian & New South Wales Champion's
(New South Wales) (Australian Capital Territory) UTS-UC Hawks Handball Club	Combined University of Technology Sydney & University of Canberra
(Queensland) Brisbane Wolves	Combined from University of Queensland, Northern Panthers & Logan Wizards
(Victoria (state)) Saint Kilda Handball Club	Victorian Champion

== Results ==
=== Table ===
Team	Pld	W	D	L	GF	GA	GD	Pts
(New South Wales) Sydney University	6	6	0	0	189	136	+53	12
(Victoria (state)) St Kilda HC	6	3	1	2	143	147	−4	7
(New South Wales) (Australian Capital Territory) UTS-UC Hawks	6	2	1	3	175	178	−3	5
(Queensland) Brisbane Wolves	6	0	0	6	146	192	−46	0

=== Round 1 – Geelong (Victoria) ===
11 May 2017; 10:00	Sydney University	31-17	Brisbane Wolves	Corio Leisuretime Center, Geelong
11 May 2017; 10:00	Puentes (7)	(14-9)	Duffy & Gahan (4)	Corio Leisuretime Center, Geelong
11 May 2017; 10:00	3× (yellow card) 2× (suspension)	Report	3× (yellow card) 3× (suspension)	Corio Leisuretime Center, Geelong

12 May 2017; 10:20	St Kilda	15-15	UTS-UC Hawks	Corio Leisuretime Center, Geelong
12 May 2017; 10:20	Pahlen (3)	(9-9)	Warrerner (6)	Corio Leisuretime Center, Geelong
12 May 2017; 10:20	1× (yellow card) 2× (suspension)	Report		Corio Leisuretime Center, Geelong

13 May 2017; 15:20	Sydney University	26-11	St Kilda	Corio Leisuretime Center, Geelong
13 May 2017; 15:20	Cornella (8)	(11-6)	Pinto (4)	Corio Leisuretime Center, Geelong
13 May 2017; 15:20	2× (yellow card) 6× (suspension)	Report	1× (yellow card) 3× (suspension)	Corio Leisuretime Center, Geelong

13 May 2017; 16:40	Brisbane Wolves	32-38	UTS-UC Hawks	Corio Leisuretime Center, Geelong
13 May 2017; 16:40	Gahan & Marshall (7)	(14-16)	Dlb (12)	Corio Leisuretime Center, Geelong
13 May 2017; 16:40	4× (yellow card) 6× (suspension)	Report		Corio Leisuretime Center, Geelong

14 May 2017; 10:20	St Kilda	32-23	Brisbane Wolves	Corio Leisuretime Center, Geelong
14 May 2017; 10:20	Nicolas (10)	(16-18)	Gahan (8)	Corio Leisuretime Center, Geelong
14 May 2017; 10:20	1× (yellow card) 1× (suspension)	Report	2× (suspension)	Corio Leisuretime Center, Geelong

14 May 2017; 13:00	Sydney University	30-24	UTS-UC Hawks	Corio Leisuretime Center, Geelong
14 May 2017; 13:00	Versleeuwen (7)	(19-11)	Besseman & Dlb (6)	Corio Leisuretime Center, Geelong
14 May 2017; 13:00	1× (yellow card) 3× (suspension)	Report	1× (yellow card) 2× (suspension)	Corio Leisuretime Center, Geelong

=== Round 2 – Gold Coast (Queensland) ===
29 July 2017; 09:30	Brisbane Wolves	17-25	St Kilda	Runaway Bay Sport Super Centre, Gold Coast
29 July 2017; 09:30	Gahan (8)	(9-13)	Rohl (8)	Runaway Bay Sport Super Centre, Gold Coast
29 July 2017; 09:30	3× (yellow card) 1× (suspension)	Report	2× (yellow card) 1× (suspension)	Runaway Bay Sport Super Centre, Gold Coast

29 July 2017; 11:00	Sydney University	36-32	UTS-UC Hawks	Runaway Bay Sport Super Centre, Gold Coast
29 July 2017; 11:00	Szklarski (13)	(16-11)	Warrerner (11)	Runaway Bay Sport Super Centre, Gold Coast
29 July 2017; 11:00	2× (yellow card)	Report	3× (yellow card) 2× (suspension)	Runaway Bay Sport Super Centre, Gold Coast

29 July 2017; 14:00	Sydney University	33-26	St Kilda	Runaway Bay Sport Super Centre, Gold Coast
29 July 2017; 14:00	Carvalho & Kwiatkowski (8)	(17-11)	Stabel (8)	Runaway Bay Sport Super Centre, Gold Coast
29 July 2017; 14:00	3× (yellow card) 1× (suspension)	Report	3× (yellow card) 2× (suspension)	Runaway Bay Sport Super Centre, Gold Coast

29 July 2017; 15:30	Brisbane Wolves	31-33	UTS-UC Hawks	Runaway Bay Sport Super Centre, Gold Coast
29 July 2017; 15:30	Gahan (8)	(16-11)	Warrerner (8)	Runaway Bay Sport Super Centre, Gold Coast
29 July 2017; 15:30	2× (yellow card)	Report	2× (yellow card)	Runaway Bay Sport Super Centre, Gold Coast

30 July 2017; 11:30	UTS-UC Hawks	33-34	St Kilda	Runaway Bay Sport Super Centre, Gold Coast
30 July 2017; 11:30	Warrerner (10)	(16-16)	Pahlen & Stabel (8)	Runaway Bay Sport Super Centre, Gold Coast
30 July 2017; 11:30	3× (yellow card)	Report	3× (yellow card)	Runaway Bay Sport Super Centre, Gold Coast

30 July 2017; 14:00	Brisbane Wolves	26-33	Sydney University	Runaway Bay Sport Super Centre, Gold Coast
30 July 2017; 14:00	Gahan (12)	(13-17)	Szklarski (13)	Runaway Bay Sport Super Centre, Gold Coast
30 July 2017; 14:00	2× (yellow card) 2× (suspension)	Report	1× (yellow card) 1× (suspension)	Runaway Bay Sport Super Centre, Gold Coast

=== Round 3 – Canberra (ACT) ===
Cancelled

=== Finals - Sydney ===
Semifinals
4	Brisbane Wolves	32
1	Sydney University	34
2	St Kilda	28
3	UTS-UC Hawks	20

Final
1	Sydney University	17
3	St Kilda	22
Small Final
3	UTS-UC Hawks	34
4	Brisbane Wolves	27

==== Semi-finals ====
18 November 2017; 18:30	4. Brisbane Wolves	32-34	1. Sydney University	Sydney Boys High School, Sydney
18 November 2017; 18:30	Gahan & Marshall (8)	(13-10)	Szklarski (16)	Sydney Boys High School, Sydney
18 November 2017; 18:30	1× (yellow card) 5× (suspension)	Report	2× (suspension)	Sydney Boys High School, Sydney

18 November 2017; 20:00	2. St Kilda	28-20	3. UTS-UC Hawks	Sydney Boys High School, Sydney
18 November 2017; 20:00	Phalan (7)	(15-10)	Warrener (5)	Sydney Boys High School, Sydney
18 November 2017; 20:00	2× (yellow card) 3× (suspension)	Report	1× (yellow card) 2× (suspension)	Sydney Boys High School, Sydney

=== Bronze Medal match ===
19 November 2017; 10:30	UTS-UC Hawks	34–27	Brisbane Wolves	Valentine Sports Park, Sydney
19 November 2017; 10:30	Warrener & Turecek (9)	(21–13)	Gahan (7)	Valentine Sports Park, Sydney
19 November 2017; 10:30	1× (yellow card)	Report	2× (yellow card)	Valentine Sports Park, Sydney

=== Gold Medal match ===
19 November 2017; 12:30	Sydney University	17-22	St Kilda	Valentine Sports Park, Sydney
19 November 2017; 12:30	Sancho (4)	(10-10)	Guillard (8)	Valentine Sports Park, Sydney
19 November 2017; 12:30	2× (yellow card) 1× (suspension)	Report	1× (yellow card)	Valentine Sports Park, Sydney

== Final standings ==
Classification
1st place, gold medalist(s)	(Victoria (state)) Saint Kilda Handball Club
2nd place, silver medalist(s)	(New South Wales) Sydney University Handball Club
3rd place, bronze medalist(s)	(New South Wales) (Australian Capital Territory) UTS-UC Hawks Handball Club
4	(Queensland) Brisbane Wolves
