= 2019 Queensland Handball League =

Australian sports league

The 2019 Queensland Handball League was a Brisbane based championship for Handball.

The University Competition is the only competition currently finished. This was played during the National Championships on the Gold Coast. The University of Queensland won over University of the Sunshine Coast. Bond University was third.

The school tournament was played in October. The Senior Boys division was won by Cavendish Road State High School. Junior boys was won by Redlands College. The Junior & Senior girls tournament was merged. The winner was Brisbane State High School.

== Opens Championship ==
Team	Pld	W	D	L	GF	GA	GD	Pts
UQ Wildcats	2	2	0	0	72	51	+21	4
UQ Jimmy & The Kids	2	2	0	0	70	50	+20	4
Goal Diggers	2	0	0	2	55	72	−17	0
Brisbane Handball Club	2	0	0	2	46	70	−24	0

=== Round 1 ===
August 2019	UQ Jimmy & The Kids	36 - 28	Goal Diggers	University of Queensland

August 2019	UQ Wildcats	36 - 24	Brisbane Handball Club	University of Queensland

=== Round 2 ===
September 2019	UQ Wildcats	36 - 27	Goal Diggers	University of Queensland

September 2019	UQ Jimmy & The Kids	34 - 22	Brisbane Handball Club	University of Queensland

=== Finals ===
==== Gold medal match ====
October 2019	UQ Wildcats	Def	UQ Jimmy & The Kids	University of Queensland

==== Bronze medal match ====
October 2019	Brisbane Handball Club	Def	Goal Diggers	University of Queensland

== University Competition ==
Team	Pld	W	D	L	GF	GA	GD	Pts
University of the Sunshine Coast	2	1	1	0	33	32	+1	3
University of Queensland	2	0	2	0	13	13	0	2
Bond University	2	0	1	1	19	20	−1	1

=== Pool games ===
October 2019	University of Queensland	13 - 13	University of the Sunshine Coast	Coomera Indoor Sports Stadium

October 2019	Bond University	19 - 20	University of the Sunshine Coast	Coomera Indoor Sports Stadium

October 2019	University of Queensland	cancelled	Bond University	Coomera Indoor Sports Stadium

=== Final ===
October 2019	University of Queensland	16 - 9	University of the Sunshine Coast	Coomera Indoor Sports Stadium

== Queensland All Schools Championship ==
=== Senior Boys ===
1. Cavendish Road State High School
2. Redeemer Lutheran College
3. Brisbane State High 1
4. Brisbane State High 2

=== Junior Boys ===
1. Redlands College
2. Brisbane State High School
3. Cavendish Road State High School

=== Senior Girls ===
1. Brisbane State High School
2. United Brisbane Schools
3. Cavendish Road State High School

== Brisbane Junior Competition ==
=== Term 3 Competition ===
Team	Pld	W	D	L	GF	GA	GD	Pts
Team 3	17	12	1	4	–	–	—	25
Banana Benders	17	11	1	5	–	–	—	23
Spirit	18	7	0	11	–	–	—	14
Camp Hill Anglican College	10	0	0	10	–	–	—	0

==== Bronze Medal match ====
16 September 2019	Spirit	10 - 9	Camp Hill Anglican College	Balmoral High School

==== Gold Medal match ====
16 September 2019	Team 3	12 - 14	Banana Benders	Balmoral High School
