= Saint Kilda Handball Club =

- Full name: Saint Kilda Handball Club
- Short name: St Kilda HBC
- Founded: 2012
- League: Handball League Australia; Victorian Handball League
- Club colours
Home	Away

The Saint Kilda Handball Club is a handball team from St Kilda, Australia. They are two times Men's National Runner-up's.

== Records ==
=== Men ===
- Oceania Handball Champions Cup

Runner-up - 2014, 2015
3rd Place - 2016, 2017

- Australian Handball Club Championship

Runner-up - 2014, 2015
3rd Place - 2016, 2017

- Handball League Australia - 1 title

Winners - 2017
3rd Place - 2016

- Victorian Handball League - 2 titles

Winners - 2017, 2016
