= 2015 Queensland Handball League season =

2015 Queensland Handball League

Seasons
- ← 2014 2016 →

The 2015 Queensland Handball League is a Brisbane based championship for Handball. It is a home and away structure conducted in April to July 2015, with the winning team qualifying for the National Club Championship.

The Northern Panthers firsts team won the competition from the Logan Wizards. Third was the Northern Panthers seconds and defending champions the University of Queensland were fourth. In the women, the Northern Panthers defeated the University of Queensland to claim the title.

The North Brisbane Spring Competition was held in September 2015 and was a mixed male and female teams competition (similar to University Games rules) which was won by the Panthers Green team. The University of Queensland were the only non Northern Panthers team to participate.

The Northern University Games were held at Toowoomba in July 2015, with defending champions Griffith University again taking out the gold medal. Silver medal winners were again the Queensland University of Technology. This year the University of New England took bronze.

The Junior competition was run by Northern Panthers Handball Association and held during the second school term (April–June 2015) for the second season and featured three boys and one girls team, won by North Brisbane.

== Standings ==
=== Men's Open ===
Team	Pld	W	D	L	GF	GA	GD	Pts
Northern Panthers 1	0	0	0	0	0	0	0	0
Logan Wizards	0	0	0	0	0	0	0	0
Northern Panthers 2	0	0	0	0	0	0	0	0
University of Queensland	0	0	0	0	0	0	0	0

Final

9 July 2015	Northern Panthers 1	? – ?	Logan Wizards	MacGregor State High School

=== Women's Open ===
1. Northern Panthers
2. University of Queensland

=== North Brisbane Seniors Spring Competition ===
Team	Pld	W	D	L	GF	GA	GD	Pts
Panthers Green	12	7	3	2	58	44	+14	17
Panthers Youth	12	6	2	4	46	48	−2	14
Panthers Orange	12	2	5	5	42	41	+1	9
University of Queensland	8	1	1	6	22	35	−13	3

=== Northern University Games - Mixed ===
Team	Pld	W	D	L	GF	GA	GD	Pts
Griffith University	8	8	0	0	244	118	+126	16
Queensland University of Technology	8	4	0	4	138	163	−25	8
University of New England	8	0	0	8	84	185	−101	0

=== Junior ===
Team	Pld	W	D	L	GF	GA	GD	Pts
North Brisbane Panther Cubs	20	15	2	3	121	75	+46	32
Brisbane City United	20	13	1	6	119	91	+28	27
South Brisbane Jesters	20	9	1	10	96	84	+12	19
Pink Panther Cubs	20	1	0	19	49	135	−86	2
