= New South Wales Handball League =

The New South Wales Handball League is a Sydney based championship for Handball run by The New South Wales Handball Association.

== Winners ==
Year	Men's	Women's
1989	Sydney University	unknown
2001	Sydney University	unknown
2002	Sydney University	unknown
2003	Sydney University	unknown
2004	unknown	Sydney University
2005	unknown	Sydney University
2007	Canberra HC	Sydney University
2008	Sydney University	unknown
2009	Sydney University	Sydney University
2010	Five Dock	Sydney University
2011	Canberra HC	Sydney University
2012	Sydney University	Sydney University
2013	unknown	Sydney University
2014	Sydney University	Sydney University
2015	Sydney University	Sydney University
2016	Sydney University	Sydney University
2017	Sydney University	Harbourside
2018	Sydney University	UTS
2019	Sydney University	UTS
2020	Sydney University	Sydney University
2021	Sydney University	UTS
2022	Sydney University	Sydney University

== See also ==
- Australian Handball Federation
- Handball League Australia
