= 2016 New South Wales Handball League =

Seasons
- ← 2015 2017 →

The 2016 Club Season started in July 2016 and went through until September 2016. Competitions are held for open women’s and open men’s teams. There is also a schools competition. The winner of the men's and women's competition qualifies for the National Club championship.

== Results ==
=== Men's open ===
Pos	Team	Pld	W	D	L	GF	GA	GD	Pts
1	Sydney University Handball Club	10	10	0	0	392	215	+177	24
2	UTS	10	7	0	3	313	289	+24	20
3	Harbourside	10	4	0	6	323	295	+28	14
4	Hills Heat	10	2	0	8	206	333	−127	12
5	UNSW	8	1	0	7	159	263	−104	10

==== 3rd/4th play off ====
24 September 2016; 9:00	Harbourside	35 - 18	Hills HC	Valentine Park, Sydney

==== Final ====
29 September 2016; 10:30	Sydney Uni	38 - 29	UTS	Valentine Park, Sydney

=== Women's open ===
Pos	Team	Pld	W	D	L	GF	GA	GD	Pts
1	Sydney University Handball Club	8	6	1	1	191	114	+77	21
2	University of Technology Sydney	14	0	2	12	114	191	−77	11

=== Schools competition ===
New South Wales Handball runs the Schools’ Championships for NSW schools. In 2015, the Championships will be contested in two divisions, the Open division for players 15+ (born ’00 or earlier) and the Youth division for players aged 11-14 (born ’01-’04), with male and female categories for each. The tournament will be held at a venue in the Sydney metropolitan area over four days (one day for each category). Results to follow.
