= Brisbane Wolves =

- Full name: Brisbane Wolves Handball Club
- Short name: Wolves
- Founded: 2016
- Head coach: Todd Morschel
- League: Handball League Australia
- Club colours
Home	Away

The Brisbane Wolves is or was a handball team from Brisbane, Queensland, Australia.

== Records ==
The team was established in 2016. As of 2017, their best result at National Club Championship was fourth.

=== Men ===
- Oceania Handball Champions Cup

4th Place - 2017
5th Place - 2016

- Australian Handball Club Championship

4th Place - 2017
5th Place - 2016

- Handball League Australia

4th Place - 2016, 2017
