= Baseball at the Australian University Games =

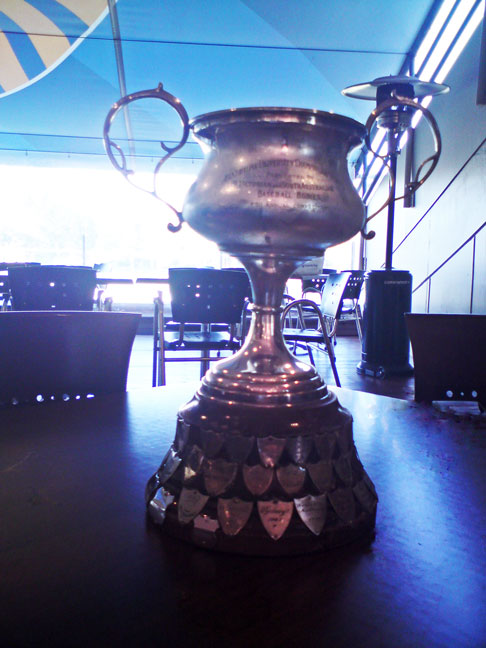
The AUG Cup was first awarded in 1925

Baseball at the Australian University Games has been part of the Australian University Games program since the 2004 games. The games are held in the last week of September during mid-Semester break. The reigning champions and most successful team is The University of Sydney who are members of the Sydney Uni Baseball Club.

== History ==
The first university baseball was established by the Sydney Uni Baseball Club when it formed in 1899. By 1904, it was playing in the New South Wales Baseball Association Second Grade. The next earliest reports of university baseball was the University of Melbourne playing in the Victorian league in 1908. Inter-varsity baseball started in Australia in 1923 when Sydney, Adelaide and Melbourne played a triangular inter-varsity series.

== List of Champions ==
| Year | City | Gold | Silver | Bronze | Teams Competing |
|---|---|---|---|---|---|
| 2004 | Perth | Edith Cowan University | Monash University | University of Wollongong | 14 |
| 2005 | Brisbane | Queensland University of Technology | University of Melbourne | Macquarie University | 11 |
| 2006 | Adelaide | University of Sydney | Monash University | University of Western Australia | 11 |
| 2007 | Gold Coast | University of Western Australia | University of Melbourne | Macquarie University | 14 |
| 2008 | Melbourne | University of Melbourne | University of Sydney | Macquarie University | 9 |
| 2009 | Gold Coast | University of Sydney | Griffith University | Monash University | 8 |
| 2010 | Perth | University of Sydney | Monash University | University of Melbourne | 4 |
| 2011 | Gold Coast | Monash University | University of Queensland | Griffith University | 10 |
| 2012 | Adelaide | University of Melbourne | University of Newcastle | Monash University | 10 |
| 2013 | Gold Coast | University of Melbourne | Monash University | Griffith University | 12 |
| 2014 | Sydney | University of Sydney | Monash University | University of Melbourne | 10 |
| 2015 | Gold Coast | Griffith University | University of Sydney | Queensland University of Technology | 13 |
| 2016 | Perth | University of Melbourne | Griffith University | University of Sydney | 10 |
| 2017 | Gold Coast | Griffith University | Queensland University of Technology | University of Sydney | 14 |
| 2018 | Gold Coast | University of Sydney | Griffith University | University of Technology Sydney | 9 |

=== Historical results ===
- 1923 – Adelaide
- 1924 – Sydney
- 1925 – Sydney
- 1926 – Sydney
- 1927 – Sydney
- 1928 – Adelaide/Sydney
- 1931 – Adelaide

== Wollongong 1994 ==
The 1994 Australian University Games were hosted by the University of Wollongong. The baseball was held at Fred Finch Reserve at Berkeley, Wollongong. A massive 16 teams from around Australia participated. The finals were contested with –

- The University of Newcastle winning Gold against the University of Melbourne, Silver.
- The University of Wollongong won the Bronze medal beating the University of New South Wales coming in 4th.

== Perth 2004 ==
The 2004 Australian University Games were held in Perth, Western Australia. Edith Cowan University won the gold medal match over Monash University. University of Wollongong won bronze over University of Western Australia.

14 teams participated including University of Wollongong, University of Sydney, University of Ballarat, University of Western Sydney, RMIT University, University of New South Wales, University of Queensland, Queensland University of Technology, Melbourne University, Monash University and University of Notre Dame Australia.

== Brisbane 2005 ==
The 2005 Australian University Games was hosted in Brisbane, Queensland. Griffith University were the overall winners, while the Queensland University of Technology won the baseball sports program.

=== Results ===
2005 AUG Results

| 26 September | Macquarie University | 6–1 | University of Western Sydney | Pool B |

| University of Wollongong | 4–4 | University of Sydney | Pool A |

| Monash University | 6–2 | University of Queensland | Pool B |

| University of Western Australia | 9–6 | University of Western Sydney | Pool B |

| University of Wollongong | 8–8 | Southern Cross University | Pool A |

| University of Western Australia | 6–2 | University of New South Wales | Pool B |

| Queensland University of Technology | 1–5 | University of Melbourne | Pool A |

| Macquarie University | 2–6 | University of New South Wales | Pool B |

| Queensland University of Technology | 1–5 | University of Melbourne | Pool A |

| 27 September | University of Wollongong | 3–5 | University of Melbourne | Pool A |

| Southern Cross University | 7–2 | University of Sydney | Pool A |

| University of Wollongong | 4–10 | Monash University | Pool B |

| University of Queensland | 1–7 | University of Western Sydney | Pool B |

| Queensland University of Technology | 8–5 | Southern Cross University | Pool A |

| University of Melbourne | 2–1 | University of Sydney | Pool A |

| Macquarie University | 7–1 | University of Queensland | Pool B |

| Monash University | 1–8 | University of New South Wales | Pool B |

| 28 September | University of New South Wales | 11–2 | University of Western Sydney | Pool B |

| University of Western Australia | 3–11 | University of Queensland | Pool B |

| Queensland University of Technology | 11–0 | University of Wollongong | Pool A |

| Macquarie University | 13–3 | Monash University | Pool B |

| University of Queensland | 2–8 | University of New South Wales | Pool B |

| University of Melbourne | 16–3 | Southern Cross University | Pool A |

| Macquarie University | 6–2 | University of Western Australia | Pool B |

| Monash University | 15–0 | University of Western Sydney | Pool B |

| 29 September | University of Sydney | 8–1 | University of Western Sydney | 9th Playoff |

| University of Wollongong | 7–4 | University of Western Australia | 7th Playoff |

| University of Queensland | 2–1 | University of Western Sydney | 10th Playoff |

| Southern Cross University | 1–5 | Monash University | 5th Playoff |

| University of Melbourne | 10–0 | Macquarie University | Semi-final |

| University of New South Wales | 10–0 | Queensland University of Technology | Semi-final |

| 30 September | Macquarie University | 11–4 | University of New South Wales | Bronze Playoff |

| University of Melbourne | 5–8 | Queensland University of Technology | Final |

== Adelaide 2006 ==
The 2006 Australian University Games was hosted in Adelaide, South Australia. The University of Adelaide, University of South Australia and Flinders University were the overall winners, while the University of Sydney won the baseball sports program.

=== Results ===
Final Standings
| Rank | University | Points |
| 1st | University of Sydney | 27 |
| 2nd | Monash University | 24 |
| 3rd | University of Western Australia | 22 |
| 4th | Macquarie University | 21 |
| 5th | University of Melbourne | 19 |
| 6th | Griffith University | 18 |
| 7th | University of New South Wales | 17 |
| 8th | Australian National University | 16 |
| 9th | University of Ballarat | 14 |
| 10th | Victoria University | 12 |
| 11th | University of Western Sydney | 11 |

== Gold Coast 2007 ==
The 2007 Australian University Games was hosted on the Gold Coast, Queensland. Griffith University were the overall winners, while the University of Western Australia won the baseball sports program. The baseball program was split into two divisions.

=== Results ===
Division 1 Standings
| Rank | University | Wins | Draws | Losses | Points |
| 1st | University of Western Australia | 5 | 1 | 0 | 17 |
| 2nd | University of Melbourne | 4 | 1 | 1 | 15 |
| 3rd | Macquarie University | 4 | 0 | 2 | 14 |
| 4th | Monash University | 3 | 1 | 2 | 13 |
| 5th | University of Sydney | 2 | 1 | 3 | 11 |
| 6th | Griffith University 1 | 1 | 0 | 5 | 8 |
| 7th | QUT | 0 | 0 | 6 | 6 |

Division 2 Standings
| Rank | University | Wins | Draws | Losses | Points |
| 1st | Australian College of PE | 4 | 1 | 0 | 14 |
| 2nd | Southern Cross University | 3 | 1 | 1 | 12 |
| 3rd | Macquarie University | 3 | 1 | 1 | 12 |
| 4th | Griffith University 2 | 3 | 0 | 2 | 11 |
| 5th | University of Western Sydney | 3 | 0 | 2 | 11 |
| 6th | University of New South Wales | 1 | 0 | 4 | 7 |
| 7th | Victorian University | 0 | 0 | 5 | 5 |

== Melbourne 2008 ==
The 2008 Australian University Games was hosted in Melbourne. Victoria University and Monash University were the overall winners, while the University of Melbourne won the baseball sports program. Silver went to The University of Sydney.

Pool A Standings
| Rank | University | Wins | Draws | Losses | Points |
| 1st | Macquarie University | 4 | 0 | 0 | 12 |
| 2nd | Flinders University | 2 | 0 | 2 | 8 |
| 3rd | University of Sydney | 1 | 1 | 2 | 7 |
| 4th | La Trobe University | 1 | 1 | 2 | 7 |
| 5th | Griffith University | 1 | 0 | 3 | 6 |

Pool B Standings
| Rank | University | Wins | Draws | Losses | Points |
| 1st | University of Melbourne | 3 | 0 | 0 | 9 |
| 2nd | Monash University | 2 | 0 | 1 | 7 |
| 3rd | Victoria University | 1 | 0 | 2 | 5 |
| 4th | University of New South Wales | 0 | 0 | 3 | 3 |

2008 AUG Results

| 29 September | Flinders University | 8–3 | University of Sydney | Pool A |

| Griffith University | 7–3 | La Trobe University | Pool A |

| Victoria University | 2–12 | University of Melbourne | Pool B |

| Monash University | 8–0 | University of New South Wales | Pool B |

| La Trobe University | 0–8 | Macquarie University | Pool A |

| Flinders University | 4–3 | Griffith University | Pool A |

| 30 September | Griffith University | 2–7 | Macquarie University | Pool A |

| University of New South Wales | 1–14 | Victoria University | Pool B |

| Monash University | 5–6 | University of Melbourne | Pool B |

| Flinders University | 2–4 | La Trobe University | Pool A |

| University of Sydney | 1–5 | Macquarie University | Pool A |

| 1 October | La Trobe University | 8–8 | University of Sydney | Pool A |

| Victoria University | 3–10 | Monash University | Pool B |

| University of Melbourne | 10–0 | University of New South Wales | Pool B |

| Macquarie University | 13–3 | Monash University | Pool B |

| Macquarie University | 9–1 | Flinders University | Pool A |

| Griffith University | 4–7 | University of Sydney | Pool A |

| 2 October | University of New South Wales | 1–13 | Griffith University | Group J (7th–9th) |

| Flinders University | 1–4 | Victoria University | Repechage – A2 vs B3 |

| University of Sydney | 10–1 | Monash University | Repechage – A3 vs B2 |

| Macquarie University | 2–7 | University of Sydney | Semi-final – A1 vs Winner R2 |

| University of Melbourne | 31–6 | Victoria University | Semi-final – B1 vs Winner R1 |

| 3 October | Griffith University | 12–2 | La Trobe University | Group J (7th–9th) |

| La Trobe University | 15–3 | University of New South Wales | Group J (7th–9th) |

| Flinders University | 13–11 | Monash University | 5th Playoff |

| Macquarie University | 12–2 | Victoria University | 3rd Playoff |

| University of Sydney | 3–12 | University of Melbourne | Final |

Repechage
A2 | Flinders University | 1
B3 | Victoria University | 4
A3 | University of Sydney | 10
B2 | Monash University | 1

Semi-finals
B1 | University of Melbourne | 31
R1 | Victoria University | 6
A1 | Macquarie University | 2
R2 | University of Sydney | 7

Grand-Final
S1 | University of Melbourne | 12
S2 | University of Sydney | 3

== Gold Coast 2009 ==
The 2009 Australian University Games were held on the Gold Coast, Queensland from 27 September – 2 October between 8 teams.

The University of Sydney won gold at with an 8–5 victory over Griffith University at Sir Bruce Small Park.

Pool A Standings
| Rank | University | Wins | Draws | Losses | Win% |
| 1st | Monash University | 3 | 0 | 0 | 100% |
| 2nd | University of Melbourne | 2 | 0 | 1 | 66% |
| 3rd | Flinders University | 1 | 0 | 2 | 33% |
| 4th | University of New England | 0 | 0 | 3 | 0% |

Pool B Standings
| Rank | University | Wins | Draws | Losses | Win % |
| 1st | Macquarie University | 3 | 0 | 0 | 100% |
| 2nd | Griffith University | 2 | 0 | 1 | 66% |
| 3rd | University of Sydney | 1 | 0 | 2 | 33% |
| 4th | University of New South Wales | 0 | 0 | 3 | 0% |

Quarter-finals
A1 | Monash University | 2
B4 | University of New South Wales | 1
A2 | University of Melbourne | 2
B3 | University of Sydney | 9
A3 | Flinders University | 5
B2 | Griffith University | 8
A4 | University of New England | 9
B1 | Macquarie University | 23

Semi-finals
A1 | Monash University | 8
B2 | Griffith University | 9
B3 | University of Sydney | 10
A1 | Macquarie University | 6

Final
B2 | Griffith University | 5
B3 | University of Sydney | 8

== Perth 2010 ==
The 2010 Australian University Games were held at Perth, Western Australia from 26 September to 1 October 2010. University of Sydney defeated Monash University 8–7 for the gold medal. The games had the lowest number of entrants since its inception, with only hosts University of Western Australia and bronze medallists University of Melbourne being the other two entrants.

== Gold Coast 2011 ==
The 2011 Australian University Games were held on the Gold Coast, Queensland from 25 to 30 September 2011. There was a total of 10 teams competing with Monash University defeating University of Queensland 8–7 in the final game. Griffith University won the bronze.

== Adelaide 2012 ==
The 2012 Australian University Games were hosted in Adelaide, South Australia from 23 to 28 September 2012. A total of 10 teams competing with University of Melbourne defeating University of Newcastle 9–2. The previous year's winners Monash University were awarded the bronze.

== Gold Coast 2013 ==
The 2013 Australian University Games were hosted on the Gold Coast, Queensland from 29 September to 4 October 2013. A total of 12 teams competed, the most since 2007, with University of Melbourne defeating Monash University 9–5 to win their second consecutive gold. Griffith University won the bronze.

== Sydney 2014 ==
The 2014 Australian University Games were held in Sydney, the first time since 2001, from 28 September to 3 October 2014 with 10 teams competing. The University of Sydney won gold with a 15–10 win over Monash University in the championship game, while The University of Melbourne defeated University of Newcastle 13–3 in the bronze medal match.

== Gold Coast 2015 ==
The 2015 Australian University Games were hosted on the Gold Coast, Queensland from 28 September to 2 October 2015. A total of 13 teams competed, the most since 2013, with Griffith University defeating University of Sydney 9–4 to win their first gold medal since 2005. Queensland University of Technology won the bronze with a 9–8 win over Monash University.

== Perth 2016 ==
The 2016 Australian University Games will be held in Perth, Western Australia from 26 to 30 September 2016. A total of 9 teams will compete in the tournament being held at Kingsway Regional Sporting Complex, the home of the Wanneroo Giants Baseball Club.

== See also ==
- Baseball in Australia
- Australian University Games
- Baseball awards#Australia
