= UniSport Division 1 Handball Nationals =

Mixed gender handball tournament in Australia

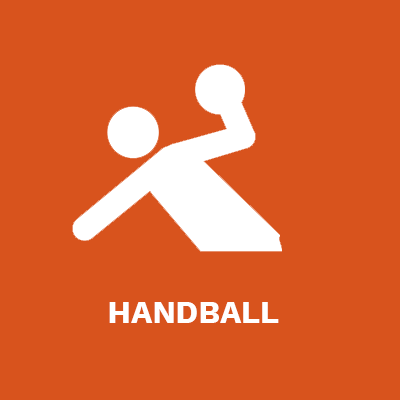

Tournament information
- Sport: Handball
- Location: Australia
- Established: 2007
- Teams: 8

Current champion
- University of Queensland Handball Club (2)

The UniSport Division 1 Handball Nationals is an annual mixed gender tournament conducted by the UniSport to determine the national champion of Division 1 collegiate handball in Australia. The tournament was first held in 2007.

== Results ==
Year	Final			3rd place match			Teams
Year	Champions	Score	Runners-up	3rd place	Score	4th place	Teams
2007 (Note: Only men); Tallebudgera, Queensland	Griffith University	18-9	University of New South Wales	University of Sydney	30-10	University of South Australia	5
2008; Melbourne	Macquarie University	27-25	Royal Melbourne Institute of Technology	Victoria University	20-19	University of Melbourne	8
2009	Bond University	?	Macquarie University	Victoria University	?	University of Sydney	6
2010	Curtin University	?	University of Western Australia	Monash University	?	Edith Cowan University	9
2011	University of Sydney	?	University of Western Australia	Edith Cowan University	?	University of New South Wales	8
2012; Adelaide	University of Technology Sydney	44-30	University of Sydney	Monash University	17-14	University of Ballarat	8
2013; Tallebudgera	University of Technology Sydney	27-19	University of Queensland	University of Western Australia	24-11	University of Sydney	8
2014; Sydney	University of Sydney	19-17	Deakin University	University of Western Australia	27-17	University of Technology Sydney	8
2015; Tallebudgera	University of Technology Sydney	25-23	Deakin University	Australian College of Physical Education	23-15	University of Sydney	8
2016; Mount Claremont	Deakin University	27-24	Queensland University of Technology	University of Technology Sydney	41-31	University of Adelaide	8
2017; Carrara, Queensland	Griffith University	35-24	University of Canberra	Queensland University of Technology	25-23	University of Western Sydney	11
2018; Coomera, Queensland	University of Queensland	34-30	University of Technology Sydney	Queensland University of Technology	36-25	Australian College of Physical Education	9
2019; Coomera, Queensland	University of Queensland	27-17	University of Technology Sydney	University of New South Wales	26-11	University of the Sunshine Coast	8
2020	Tournament canceled due to the COVID-19 outbreak						

== Medal count ==
Rank	University	Gold	Silver	Bronze	Total
1	University of Technology Sydney	3	2	1	6
2	University of Sydney	2	1	1	4
3	University of Queensland	2	1	0	3
4	Griffith University	2	0	0	2
5	Deakin University	1	2	0	3
6	Macquarie University	1	1	0	2
7	Bond University	1	0	0	1
7	Curtin University	1	0	0	1
9	University of Western Australia	0	2	2	4
10	Queensland University of Technology	0	1	2	3
11	University of New South Wales	0	1	1	2
12	Royal Melbourne Institute of Technology	0	1	0	1
12	University of Canberra	0	1	0	1
14	Monash University	0	0	2	2
14	Victoria University	0	0	2	2
16	Australian College of Physical Education	0	0	1	1
16	Edith Cowan University	0	0	1	1
Totals (17 entries)		13	13	13	39

== See also ==
- UniSport Division 2 Handball Nationals
