= Sydney Uni Sport and Fitness =

University of Sydney's sporting body

Sydney Uni Sport & Fitness (SUSF) is the University of Sydney's sporting body. SUSF currently manages and administers more than 40 sport and recreation clubs, also organising sporting and recreation events, and offering student and non-student members a comprehensive range of sporting facilities. SUSF also provides sport scholarships and other support to student-athletes.

== History ==
Dorette Margarethe MacCallum was a supporter of women's suffrage and she became the founding President of the Sydney University Women's Sports Association (SUWSA) in 1910. MacCallum had been a leading figure of the University Tennis Club and this was one of the three clubs that merged to create the SUWSA. 24 women students were present, this was a lower percentage representation than for male students anfd their association. Each of the women present were asked to sign their commitment to support the SUWSA as the new body intended to challenge the monopoly of the Sydney University Sports Union (of men) over the university's playing fields. One of the two dozen women was Jessie Lillingston who would go on to lead similar challenges to the patriarchy.

On 1 January 2003, the Sydney University Sports Union (1890) and the Sydney University Women's Sports Association (1910) amalgamated. In 2008, the organisation was renamed and Sydney Uni Sport & Fitness was launched. Today, SUSF manages and administers more than 40 sport and recreation clubs, organises sporting and recreation events and offers sporting facilities to students and the wider Sydney community.

Sporting events run by SUSF include lunchtime social sport, short courses, tennis coaching, learn to swim and a school holiday sports program. Intervarsity Sport competitions, Intercollegiate Sport and Intramural Sport are also run by the organisation.

Since 1990, SUSF has provided sporting scholarships.

== Registered clubs ==
Sydney University Football Club, founded in 1863, is the oldest rugby union club in Australia. The club was a member of the inaugural Sydney club competition in 1874. The club currently in the Shute Shield.

In women's basketball, the Sydney Uni Flames compete in the WNBL. The Flames were transferred to owners of the Sydney Kings, TSE, in 2020. The men's and women's water polo clubs also compete in their national leagues.

The cricket club, founded in 1864, has competed in the Sydney Grade Cricket competition since its inception. The University fielded a rugby league team in the New South Wales Rugby League's Sydney premiership from 1920 to 1937. It currently competes in the NSW Tertiary Student Rugby League competition.

The Sydney Uni Baseball Club was established in 1904, and enters three teams in the Sydney Winter Baseball League, which is the highest calibre competition in the state for the winter season. The club also enters a fourth team into the Pacific Coast Baseball League.

The Sydney Uni Boxing Club (SUBxC) was established as an independent club in 1908, having existed prior to this as a division of Sydney Uni Athletics Club (est. 1878).

The Sydney University Fencing Club (SUFC) was founded in 1945 and is the oldest university fencing club in Australia. The club actively competes in all state and national level tournaments with active members on the international circuit, including several Olympians.

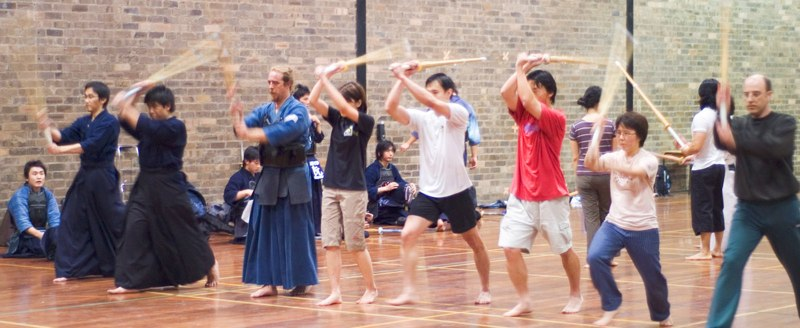
Kendo Club training at HK Ward Gym

The Kendo club actively participates in all regional and national level tournaments, as well as Australian University Games (now Nationals) every year. The club is a member of New South Wales Kendo Association governed by the Australian Kendo Renmei.

The Sydney University Soccer Football Club was founded in 1946. The club fields elite teams for men and women in the Football NSW Super League and Premier League respectively. The club also fields all age men's teams in the Eastern Suburbs Football Association and all age women's teams in the North West Sydney Women's Soccer Association. They also have a number of junior girls' teams and an over 35 men's team.

The Australian rules football club has teams in the Sydney AFL and the women's SWAFL competitions.

The American football club, the Lions, was founded in 1984 and is the most successful club in the Gridiron NSW league, with twenty nine championship game appearances and twenty state titles, including the last sixteen in a row (2003–2018).

The Sydney University Taekwondo Club is a World Taekwondo Federation club formed in mid-2001 to cater for students who wish to learn mainstream taekwondo and represent Sydney University at the annual inter-university sporting events, such as Australian University Games.

The Sydney University Handball Club are five times National Champions, five times Oceania Champions and qualified for the 2012, 2013, 2014, 2015 and 2016 IHF Super Globe competitions. The men's team has won the State Championship nine times, in 2015, 2014, 2012, 2009, 2008, 2003, 2002, 2001, and 1998. The women's team has won the State Championship also nine times.

- Australian Rules
- American Football
- Archery
- Athletics
- Badminton
- Baseball
- Basketball
- Basketball (Wheelchair Flames)
- Boxing
- Canoe/Kayak
- Cheerleading
- Cricket
- Cycling & Triathlon
- Fencing
- Football
- Golf
- Gymnastics
- Handball
- Hockey
- Judo
- Kempo Karate
- Kendo
- Netball
- Rockclimbing &Mountaineering
- Rowing
- Rugby League
- Rugby Union
- Soccer
- Squash
- Swimming
- Table Tennis
- Taekwondo
- Tennis
- Touch
- Ultimate Frisbee
- Volleyball
- Water polo
- Waterski & Wakeboard
- Wrestling & Grappling
