= Luca Bellisomo =

South African soccer player

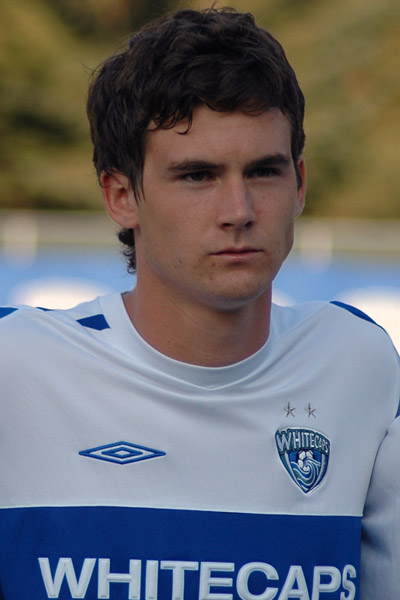

Personal information
- Full name: Luca Bellisomo
- Date of birth: 25 October 1986 (age 40)
- Place of birth: Johannesburg, South Africa
- Height: 6 ft 2 in (1.88 m)
- Position: Defender

Youth career
- 2001: Queensland Academy of Sport
- 2003: North Shore Metro
- 2004: Delta Selects
- 2006–2008: Vancouver Columbus FC

College career
Years	Team	Apps	(Gls)
2004–2007	Simon Fraser Clan		

Senior career*
Years	Team	Apps	(Gls)
2002	Brisbane Wolves		
2008	Whitecaps Residency	2	(0)
2008–2010	Vancouver Whitecaps	50	(3)
2009	→ Whitecaps Residency (loan)	9	(0)
2011–2012	IFK Mariehamn	26	(1)
- * Club domestic league appearances and goals as of 22 October 2019

Luca Bellisomo (born 25 October 1986) is a South African soccer player who last played for Finnish Veikkausliiga club IFK Mariehamn.

== Career ==
=== Youth and college ===
Bellisomo was born in South Africa, and moved with his family to the Greater Vancouver area in 1994. He played youth soccer on Lower Mainland, before moving again with his family, this time to Australia in 2001

In Australia, Bellisomo was student at The Cathedral School of St Anne & St James in the Australian city of Townsville, Queensland, and went on to play for the Queensland Academy of Sport, the Queensland U-17 state team, and the North Queensland schoolboys side. He also played on a couple of senior men's soccer teams, notably the Brisbane Wolves in the Queensland Soccer Federation XXXX League.

He returned to Canada in 2004 and played four years of college soccer at Simon Fraser University, where he was named an NAIA Third Team All-American in his third year and First Team All American in his final year. He subsequently joined the Vancouver Whitecaps youth academy, Vancouver Whitecaps Residency, and played for the team in the USL Premier Development League in 2008.

=== Professional ===
Bellisomo was called up to the senior Vancouver Whitecaps side on 18 August 2008 and played 11 games in the USL First Division. He was signed to a full professional contract by the Whitecaps in February, 2009 and continued to play for the senior team in 2010.

Bellisomo moved to Finland in 2011 when he signed for Veikkausliiga club IFK Mariehamn. He made his debut for Mariehamn on 18 January 2011 in a 4–0 victory over FC Haka in the Finnish League Cup.

=== International ===
Bellisomo captained Canada to a fourth-place finish at the 2007 Summer Universiade in Bangkok, Thailand, eventually finishing in fourth place when Canada lost on penalties to hosts Thailand in the bronze medal playoff game. He also played 3 seasons with for Vancouver Columbus FC in 2006, 2007 and 2008.

== Honours ==
=== Vancouver Whitecaps ===
- USL First Division championship (1): 2008

== Club statistics ==
Season	Team	League	Domestic League		Domestic Playoffs		Domestic Cup		Continental Championship		Total	
Season	Team	League	Apps	Goals	Apps	Goals	Apps	Goals	Apps	Goals	Apps	Goals
2008	Vancouver Whitecaps FC	USL-1	11	1	-	-	-	-	-	-	11	1
2009	Vancouver Whitecaps FC	USL-1	10	0	6	0	-	-	-	-	16	0
2010	Vancouver Whitecaps FC	USSF D-2	29	2	4	0	4	0	-	-	37	2
Career Total			50	3	10	0	4	0	-	-	64	3

Updated: 20 October 2010.
