= 2013 Oceania Handball Champions Cup =

2013 handball competition

The 2013 Oceania Handball Champions Cup was held in Sydney, Australia on 18 and 19 May 2013. This was organised by the Oceania Handball Federation and featured teams from Australia and New Zealand.

The tournament was won by Australian team Sydney University who then won the right to represent Oceania in the 2013 IHF Super Globe.

== Results ==
=== Leg One ===
18 May 2013; 6:30 pm	(Australia) Sydney University	25 – 20	(New Zealand) Auckland Region	Sydney Olympic Park

=== Leg Two ===
19 May 2013; 12:30 pm	(New Zealand) Auckland Region	21 – 26	(Australia) Sydney University	Sydney Olympic Park
