= 2014 New South Wales Handball League =

Seasons
- ← 2013 2015 →

The 2014 Club Season started on Saturday May 17 at Sydney Olympic Park and went through until September 2014. Competitions are held for open women’s and open men’s teams. There is also a schools competition.

The winner of the men's competition qualifies for the National Club championship.

== Results ==
=== Men's open ===
Pos	Team	Pld	W	D	L	GF	GA	GD	Pts
1	Harbourside	13	9	1	3	338	266	+72	29
2	Sydney University	13	9	1	3	311	191	+120	25
3	Hills Heat	13	4	2	7	308	289	+19	22
4	UTS	13	5	2	6	260	245	+15	22
5	UNSW	12	1	2	9	157	383	−226	16

==== Semi finals ====
23 August 2014; 09:00	Sydney University	31 – 19	Hills Heat

23 August 2014; 11:00	Harbourside	33 – 25	UTS

==== Final ====
30 August 2014; 11:00	Harbourside	14 - 32	Sydney University

=== Women's open ===
Pos	Team	Pld	W	D	L	GF	GA	GD	Pts
1	Sydney Uni Scorpions	16	16	0	0	536	249	+287	45
2	UTS Black	16	7	0	9	275	282	−7	27
3	Sydney Uni Lions	15	5	0	10	270	363	−93	25
4	UTS White	15	3	0	12	113	300	−187	13

=== Schools Competition ===
The XIX Schools’ Championships were held at Sydney Olympic Park Sports Halls on May 26 (girls) and May 27 (boys), 2014. Many schools participated – the most entrants since 2008 – and all teams improved over the course of each day, with some great handball displays from the seasoned competitors through to the teams who had never played until the tournament.

Pos	Girls Team	Pos	Boys Team
1	Turramurra High School	1	Sefton High School Light
2	Fairvale High School	=	Fairvale High School
3	OLMC Parramatta	3	Fairfield High School
4	Chatswood High School Dark	4	Miller Technology High School
5	Pennant Hills High School	5	Chatswood High School Light
6	Baulkham Hills High School Light	=	Turramurra High School
7	St Marks Catholic College	7	The Hills Grammar School
8	Mary MacKillop College	=	Baulkham Hills High School
9	Miller Technology High School	9	Epping Boys High School
10	St Marys Senior High School	10	Chatswood High School Dark
=	The Hills Grammar School	11	Sefton High School Dark
12	Sefton High School	12	Figtree High School
13	Baulkham Hills High School Dark	13	Glenwood High School
14	St Scholastica’s College		
15	Chatswood High School Light		
