= 2015 New South Wales Handball League =

Seasons
- ← 2014 2016 →

The 2015 Club Season started in May 2015 and went through until August 2015. Competitions are held for open women’s and open men’s teams. There is also a schools competition. The winner of the men's competition qualifies for the National Club championship.

== Results ==
=== Men's open ===
Pos	Team	Pld	W	D	L	GF	GA	GD	Pts
1	Sydney Uni Blue	17	16	0	1	660	294	+366	43
2	Sydney Uni Gold	17	12	1	4	494	366	+128	38
3	Harbourside	17	9	1	7	496	484	+12	34
4	UTS	17	8	0	9	466	542	−76	29
5	Hills Heat	17	4	1	12	315	502	−187	25
6	UNSW	17	0	1	16	226	469	−243	13

==== Semi finals ====
22 August 2015; 09:00	Sydney Uni Blue	49 – 21	UTS

22 August 2015; 10:30	Harbourside	27 – 36	Sydney Uni Gold

==== 5th/6th play off ====
29 August 2015; 10:30	Hills Heat	19 - 14	UNSW

==== 3rd/4th play off ====
29 August 2015; 9:00	Harbourside	31 - 37	UTS

==== Final ====
30 August 2015; 11:00	Sydney Uni Blue	26 - 20	Sydney Uni Gold

=== Women's open ===
Pos	Team	Pld	W	D	L	GF	GA	GD	Pts
1	Sydney Uni Scorpions	13	12	1	0	306	196	+110	38
2	University of Technology Sydney	14	0	2	12	206	316	−110	16
3	Australian Junior Women	3	1	1	1	57	57	0	6

=== Schools competition ===
The XX Schools’ Championships were held at Sydney Olympic Park Sports Halls on April 29 (girls) and April 30 (boys), 2015. Many schools participated from across Sydney and Wollongong and all teams improved over the course of each day, with some great handball displays from the seasoned competitors through to the teams who had never played until the tournament.

Pos	Girls Team	Pos	Boys Team
1	St Marks Catholic College	1	Fairvale High School
2	Turramurra High School	2	Sefton High School
3	Fairfield High School	3	Turramurra High School
4	Sefton High School	4	Epping Boys High School
5	Pennant Hills High School	5	Figtree High School
6	Fairvale High School	6	Moriah College Light
7	OLMC Parramatta	7	Moriah College Dark
8	Mary MacKillop College Dark		
9	Mary MacKillop College Light		
10	Moriah College		
