= UniSport Division 2 Handball Nationals =

Tournament information
- Sport: Handball
- Location: Australia
- Established: 2009
- Defunct: 2016

The UniSport Division 2 Handball Nationals is an annual mixed gender tournament conducted by the UniSport to determine the national champion of Division 2 collegiate handball in Australia. The tournament was first held in 2009 and last held in 2016.

== Results ==
Year	Final			3rd place match			Teams
Year	Champions	Score	Runners-up	3rd place	Score	4th place	Teams
2009	University of New South Wales	?	University of Western Australia	University of Technology Sydney	?	Edith Cowan University	6
2010	No Tournament						
2011	University of Technology Sydney	?	Bond University	University of Queensland	?	Deakin University	11
2012; Adelaide	Victoria University	23-12	University of Wollongong	Griffith University	28-16	University of Newcastle	8
2013; Tallebudgera	Deakin University	25-24	Griffith University	Australian College of Physical Education	21-16	Queensland University of Technology	14
2014; Sydney	Australian College of Physical Education	20-12	University of Adelaide	Queensland University of Technology	22-19	Griffith University	11
2015; Tallebudgera	Queensland University of Technology	31-25	University of Canberra	Griffith University	30-15	RMIT University	10
2016; Mount Claremont	Griffith University	37-28	University of Canberra	Flinders University	26-22	University of Wollongong	7

== Medal count ==
Rank	University	Gold	Silver	Bronze	Total
1	Griffith University	1	1	2	4
2	Australian College of Physical Education	1	0	1	2
2	Queensland University of Technology	1	0	1	2
2	University of Technology Sydney	1	0	1	2
5	Deakin University	1	0	0	1
5	University of New South Wales	1	0	0	1
5	Victoria University	1	0	0	1
8	University of Canberra	0	2	0	2
9	Bond University	0	1	0	1
9	University of Adelaide	0	1	0	1
9	University of Western Australia	0	1	0	1
9	University of Wollongong	0	1	0	1
13	Flinders University	0	0	1	1
13	University of Queensland	0	0	1	1
Totals (14 entries)		7	7	7	21

== See also ==
- UniSport Division 1 Handball Nationals
