= 2014 Australian Handball Club Championship =

The 2014 Australian Handball Club Championship consisted of two components. The first was the Beach Handball competition held in Scarborough, Western Australia during February 2014 and the second is the Indoor titles which was held in Sydney, Australia in March, 2014. Both were organised by the Australian Handball Federation and featured teams from New South Wales, Victoria, Queensland, Northern Territory, Australian Capital Territory, South Australia and hosts Western Australia.

The Beach tournament was split into Men's, Women's and Mixed. The men's title was won by the East Melbourne Spartans from Victoria. The women's and the mixed event was won by Tang from New South Wales.

The Indoor tournament was won by Sydney University. They won the right to represent Australia in the Oceania Handball Champions Cup.

== Beach results ==
=== Men's final ===
16 February 2014; 12:45	(Victoria (state)) East Melbourne Spartans	2 legs 0	(New South Wales) Tang	Scarborough Beach

=== Women's final ===
16 February 2014; 12:00	(New South Wales) Tang	2 legs 0	(Victoria (state)) Melbourne BHC	Scarborough Beach

=== Mixed final ===
15 February 2014; 17:15	(New South Wales) Tang	2 legs 0	(Northern Territory) (New South Wales) (Australian Capital Territory) NT Harbourside	Scarborough Beach

== Men's indoor results ==
=== Round Robin ===
Team	Pld	W	D	L	GF	GA	GD	Pts
Sydney University	3	3	0	0	92	59	+33	6
Saint Kilda HC	3	2	0	1	74	76	−2	4
Hills Heat HC	3	1	0	2	66	72	−6	2
Logan Wizards	3	0	0	3	63	88	−25	0

14 March 2014; 19:00	(New South Wales) Sydney University	30 - 22	(Victoria (state)) St Kilda HC	Sydney Olympic Park
14 March 2014; 19:00		(15 - 9)		Sydney Olympic Park

14 March 2014; 20:30	(New South Wales) Hills Heat HC	27 - 19	(Queensland) Logan Wizards	Sydney Olympic Park
14 March 2014; 20:30		(12 - 7)		Sydney Olympic Park

15 March 2014; 09:00	(New South Wales) Sydney University	30 - 16	(Queensland) Logan Wizards	Sydney Olympic Park
15 March 2014; 09:00		(11 - 6)		Sydney Olympic Park

15 March 2014; 09:00	(New South Wales) Hills Heat HC	18 - 21	(Victoria (state)) St Kilda HC	Sydney Olympic Park
15 March 2014; 09:00		(9 - 11)		Sydney Olympic Park

15 March 2014; 14:00	(Victoria (state)) St Kilda HC	31 - 28	(Queensland) Logan Wizards	Sydney Olympic Park
15 March 2014; 14:00		(17 - 16)		Sydney Olympic Park

15 March 2014; 15:30	(New South Wales) Sydney University	32 - 21	(New South Wales) Hills Heat HC	Sydney Olympic Park
15 March 2014; 15:30		(11 - 10)		Sydney Olympic Park

=== Final ===
16 March 2014; 10:00	(New South Wales) Sydney University	(26 - 26); OT: 34 - 28	(Victoria (state)) St Kilda HC	Sydney Olympic Park; Referees: Richard Ridley, Robert Ridley (Australia)
16 March 2014; 10:00	J.Lennstrom 11; O.Garcia Mila 8	(12 - 16)	B.Stankovic 11; V.Vulakija 5	Sydney Olympic Park; Referees: Richard Ridley, Robert Ridley (Australia)
16 March 2014; 10:00		Report		Sydney Olympic Park; Referees: Richard Ridley, Robert Ridley (Australia)

=== 3rd place play-off ===
16 March 2014; 14:30	(New South Wales) Hills Heat HC	24 - 17	(Queensland) Logan Wizards	Sydney Olympic Park
16 March 2014; 14:30		(11 - 9)		Sydney Olympic Park
