= Adam White (volleyball) =

Australian volleyball player (born 1989)

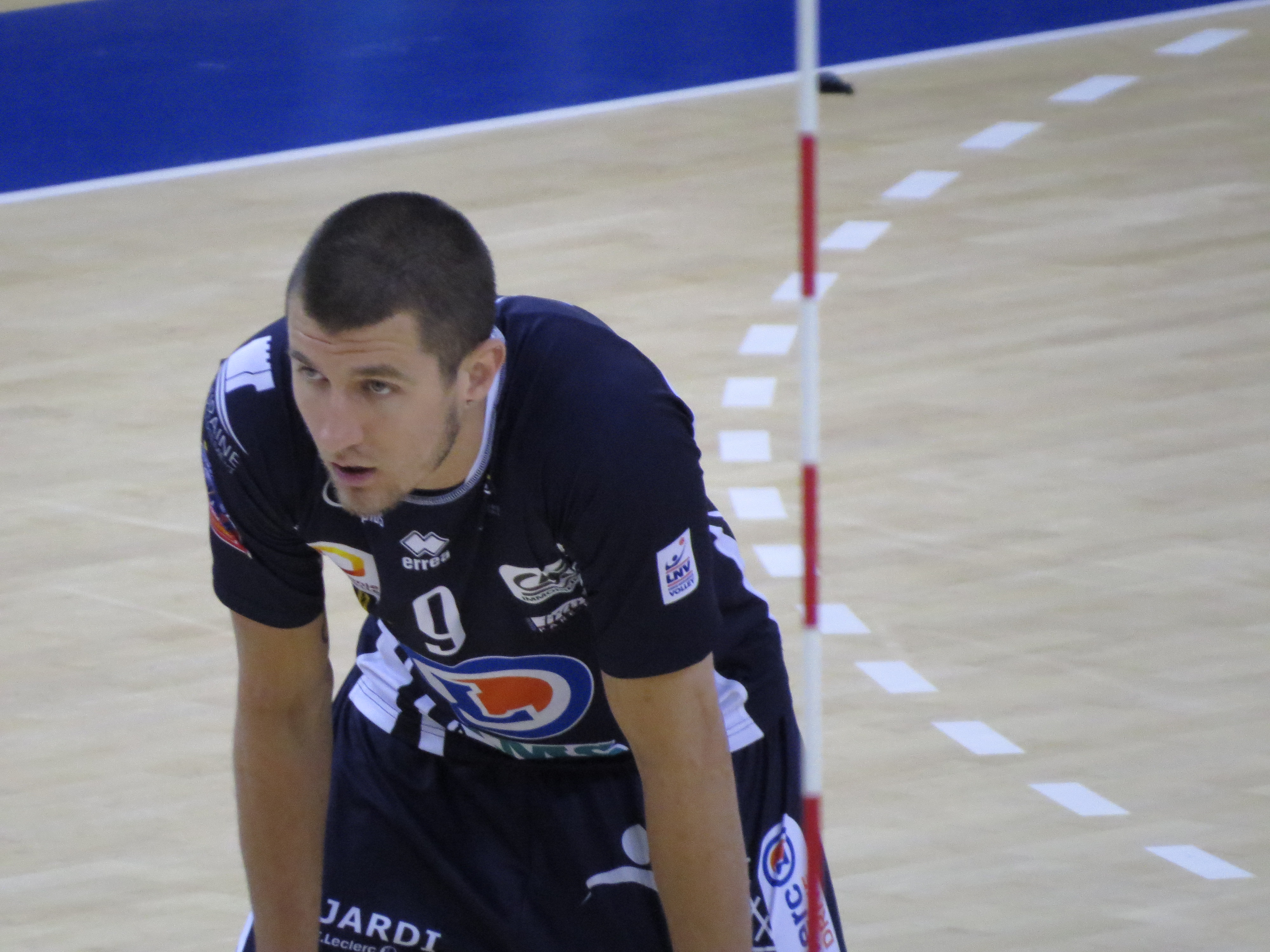

Personal information
- Nationality: Australian
- Born: 8 November 1989 (age 36)
- Height: 203 cm (6 ft 8 in)
- Weight: 89 kg (196 lb)
- Spike: 351 cm (138 in)
- Block: 336 cm (132 in)

Volleyball information
- Number: 9

Career
Years	Teams
2010	BluVolley Verona

National team
2010–2012	Australia

Adam White (born 8 November 1989) is an Australian volleyball player. He competed for Australia at the 2012 Summer Olympics.

== Early life ==
White was born on 8 November 1989 in Everton Park, Queensland, Australia. He is 203 centimetres (80 in) in height, and weighs 90 kilograms (200 lb). His nickname is "Beanery". White's hobbies include mixing music and producing music. His primary school was St. Flannan's in Queensland. He went to high school at St. Patrick's College, a private, Roman Catholic day school in Shorncliffe, Brisbane, Queensland.

== Volleyball ==
White currently plays for Active Living Orion (Netherlands). He plays in the wing spiker position. His standing reach is 260 centimetres (102 in), and his blocking reach is 357 centimetres (141 in). White's block reach is 336 centimetres (132 in). He plays in the zone four (or "Zone 4") volleyball position in the game. He has played on the national team for Australia, Australia men's national volleyball team (coached by Jon Uriarte), for five years. His international volleyball début was in 2007 with the Daejeon Samsung Bluefangs. His career started with the Australian Institute of Sport in 2004. He became captain of the Australian Institute of Sport volleyball team in 2007, and won titles with the team, in every single season, between 2005 and 2008. He first played at senior national level at the 2008 Asian Men's Cup Volleyball Championship. He was part of the Australia men's national volleyball team at the 2010 FIVB Volleyball Men's World Championship in Italy. He has been selected for Australia's national team 118 times.

His recent performances include finishing first at the 2011 International Series, when he played against Thailand. At the 2011 China Volleyball Challenge 1, he finished in second position. At the second challenge of that event, along with his team, he finished in third position. At the Rashid International Volleyball Tournament in Dubai, 2011, he finished in second position. At the 2011 Asian Championships in Tehran, Iran, he finished in fourth position. At the 2012 Volleyball International Series, his team drew with the Netherlands. At the 2012 Olympic Qualification Tournament in Tokyo, Japan, along with his team, White finished in second position.

== Clubs ==
- Langhenkel Orion (2009) NL
- TV Ingersoll Bühl (2012) GER
- BluVolley Verona (2013) ITA
- Tours volleyball (2015–2017) FRA
- Berlin Recycling Volleys (2017–2020) GER
- Active Living Orion (2020–..) NL
