= Sydney Uni Boxing Club =

- Full name: Sydney University Boxing Club
- Short name(s): SUBxC
- Founded: 1908
- Location: Sydney, Australia
- Gym(s): Bryden's Boxing Gym, Sydney University Sports & Aquatic Centre, University of Sydney
- President: Patrick Cunningham
- Treasurer: Allen Zhou
- Committee: Patrick Cunningham; Justin Rowsell; Glenn Richards; Chen Khong; Nina Mao; Allen Zhou; Deborah Lin; Amine Mikati
- Coach(es): Patrick Cunningham; Justin Rowsell; George Plellis; Leonard Purea; Glenn Richards; Jim Staninovski; Amine Mikati; Aram Tayebi; George Koskinas; Philip Le, Chen Khong

Official website
- https://sydneyuniboxing.com/

Sydney Uni Boxing Club (SUBxC), established in 1908, is the University of Sydney's boxing club. Prior to 1908, the Club existed as a division of Sydney University Athletics Club. SUBxC is a founding member of the NSW Amateur Boxing Association (NSW ABA, known also as Boxing NSW), and is currently a member club of Sydney Uni Sport and Fitness, where it conducts all levels of boxing training at the dedicated facilities of the University Sports & Aquatic Centre. Historically, the Club has competed against other Australian universities, as well as teams from the Australian military.

== Competition ==
Sydney Uni Boxing Club enters its own competitive boxers in State/National competition, and also hosts the annual University of Sydney Inter-Collegiate and Club Boxing Tournament, which has traditionally been held on the second Wednesday of October.

=== Club and College Competition ===
Competition between the University of Sydney's Colleges occur as part of the University of Sydney Inter-Collegiate and Club Boxing Tournament, with male boxers representing St. Andrew's, St. John's, St. Paul's and Wesley competing for the trophy. Female boxers have never represented their colleges because, until 2009, it was illegal for females to compete in boxing in New South Wales. Profits from the Tournament's raffle go to aid the efforts of a local charity, the Glebe Youth Service.

=== Female boxers ===
In the University of Sydney Inter-Collegiate and Club Boxing Tournament of October 14, 2009, female boxers competed on University soil for the first time.

== Coaching and Training ==
As an active team, Sydney Uni Boxing Club conducts club training sessions all year round, coached by the various club coaches.
