= St Patrick's College, Shorncliffe =

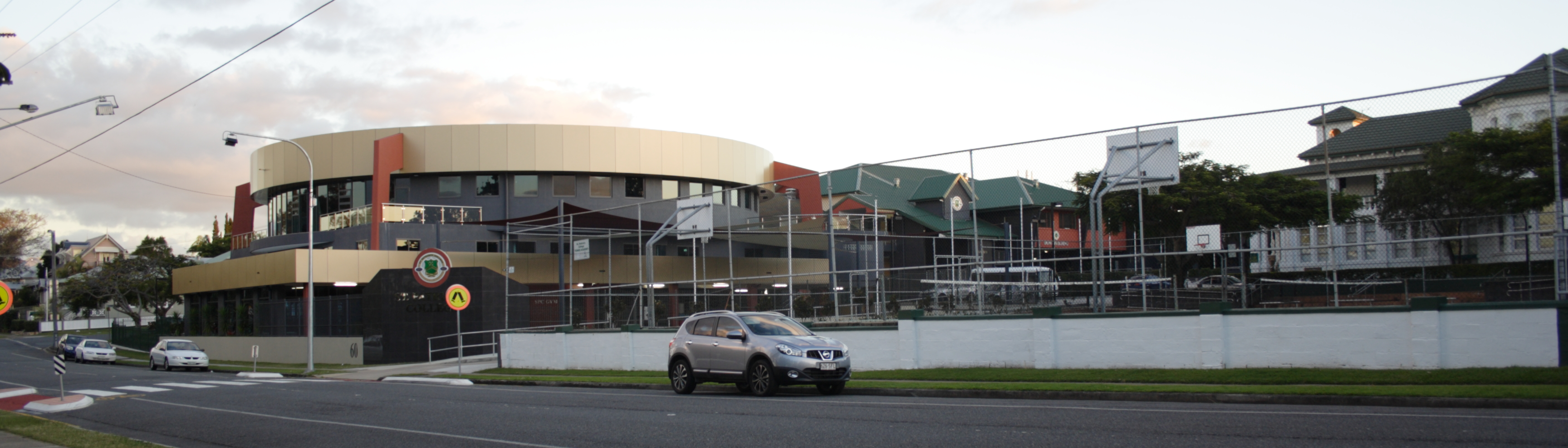
- Park Parade entrance

Location
- Shorncliffe, Brisbane, Queensland; Australia; 27°19′25.82″S 153°4′57.48″E

Information
- Type: Independent primary and secondary day school
- Motto: Latin: Certa Bonum Certamen (Fight the Good Fight)
- Religious affiliation: Catholicism
- Denomination: Congregation of Christian Brothers
- Established: 1952; 74 years ago
- Trust: Edmund Rice Education Australia
- Principal: Amber Hauff
- Years offered: 5–12
- Enrolment: 1400
- Campus: Suburban
- Colours: Green and gold
- Affiliation: Associated Independent Colleges
- Website: stpatricks.qld.edu.au

St Patrick's College is an independent Catholic primary and secondary day school for boys, located on the waterfront in Shorncliffe, north of Brisbane, in Queensland, Australia. Established by the Congregation of Christian Brothers in 1952, the college currently enrols approximately 1400 students across eight grades (Years 5 to 12).

== History ==
=== 1800s ===
In 1862, John McConnel, a pastoralist and member of the Queensland Legislative Council, began construction on a house for his family on Park Parade. McConnel commissioned Benjamin Backhouse, another politician at the time, and his architectural firm to design the property; a single-story timber house facing the waterfront. By 1864, construction was complete. A number of other properties under McConnel's name during the 1870s were built, including the Seaview Hotel built on Kate Street (now Pier Avenue) and Holland House, a boarding home.

In 1879, Moses Ward, a land speculator and chairman of the Redcliffe and Sandgate Steam Ferry Company, purchased the property. Ward sold the property the following year to David Brown of the firm Thomas Brown and Sons located in inner-city Brisbane. The property was named “Morven” after Brown's homeland in Scotland and is still known by that name today. In 1886, architect F.D.G. Stanley renovated the property to a Georgian, two-story mansion and in 1891, further work was performed by the architectural firm Oakden, Addison and Kemp.

Due to the waterfront views the building provides and its lavish upgrade, Morven became a popular residence for Brisbane's wealthy, including the likes of Queensland Governor Henry Wylie Norman.

=== 1900s ===
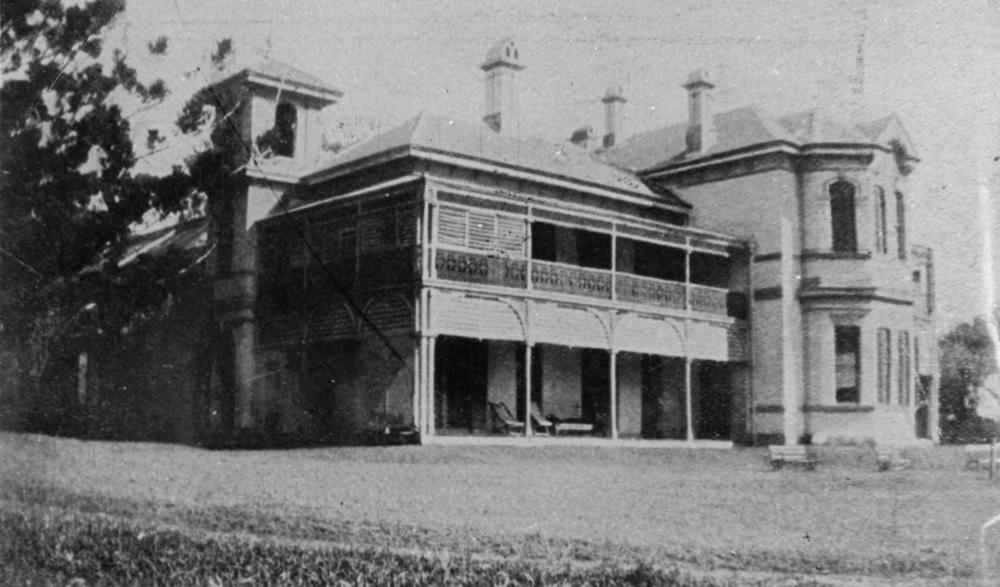
Morven during its years as a guesthouse, ca. 1932

In 1910, Edward Goddard Blume purchased Morven and in the following years it was run as a guesthouse by Blume's sister-in-law and her daughters. In 1943, Blume died and the property became derelict. Morven was commonly referred to as a 'haunted house' by locals and was in complete disuse until 1947 where the evangelical Christian movement known for their beach missions, Children's Special Service Mission, made use of the run-down property.

In 1951, the dilapidated Morven building was purchased by the parish priest of Sandgate, Father Patrick O’Rourke, in order to build a Catholic boys' school due to overcrowding at Sacred Heart, a local convent school. St Patrick’s College commenced on 29 January 1952 with Brother Coffey as the principal and 172 enrolled students.

On 22 October 1988, Tony Fitzgerald, an 'old boy' of SPC, talked at a speech night at the college in his first public outing since his appointment as chair of the Fitzgerald Inquiry. The speech focused on the youth and their role in the challenges the inquiry brought to light, saying "the solutions to the problems with which my inquiry is concerned lie with us collectively, with our attitudes and behaviour as a community".

More facilities were built over the decades to accommodate the growing student body, including a tuckshop in 1958, a swimming pool in 1972, and a middle school building for Years 5-6 in 1977 (called the Morrissey Building). In 1992, the college's main sporting fields were built on top of an old rubbish dump on Curlew Street in Sandgate, becoming known as Curlew Park.

=== 2000s ===
==== Heritage listing of Morven ====
In 2004, the Christian Brother's stopped residing in the college after 52 years of living within Morven. It was declared a local heritage place that same year due to its historical and social significance. The building now contains offices for teachers and the administration office.

==== 2010 stabbing of student ====
On 15 February 2010, twelve-year-old Elliot Fletcher was stabbed in the college's bathroom by a thirteen-year-old classmate before dying upon arrival at hospital. Media reports claimed the alleged offender was a victim of bullying at the college who stabbed Elliot using a knife intended to "scare" his tormentors. After fleeing the college grounds, the attacker was found with minor wounds and taken to hospital by police; he was charged with murder the same day.

A Facebook memorial page was created following the tragedy, seeing hundreds of people paying tribute to Elliot. After a number of graphic images were put up in an effort to vandalise the tribute page, Queensland Police launched an investigation and, in the following months, the man responsible for the defacement was charged with child exploitation offenses.

Elliot's funeral was attended by thousands of mourners, including hundreds of fellow students who formed a guard of honour around the hearse to pay tribute.

==== Support for LGBTQ+ rights ====
In 2021, the college organised activities for celebrating IDAHOBIT which involved age-appropriate education surrounding LGBTQ+ issues. This garnered backlash from some in the Catholic community, a Catholic Weekly article penning that the education was "a dangerous institutionalised cave-in hidden beneath the title of pastoral care". A QNews article instead highlighted the "overwhelming response" on social media to their "inclusive approach" to the issue.

== Sport ==
St Patrick's College is one of eight member schools of the Associated Independent Colleges (AIC) and participates in that association's sporting competitions for high school and junior school students. The college has had success in AIC, winning four aggregate cross country championships (2011, 2012, 2013, 2014), two First XI cricket premierships (2018, 2020) and two First XI football premierships (2013, 2015).

=== AIC premierships ===
St Patrick's College has won the following AIC premierships as of July 2024:

- Australian Football – 2020
- Basketball – 2015
- Chess – 2020
- Cricket (2) – 2018, 2020
- Cross Country (4) – 2011, 2012, 2013, 2014
- Rugby Union – 2018
- Rugby League – 2021
- Football (2) – 2013, 2015
- Tennis – 2006
- Volleyball – 2015

St Patrick's College also won the Balharry Shield in 2014, an AIC golf tournament.

=== Non-AIC sports ===
College esports started in Term 3 2022 with the college's participation and first place finish in the Acer High Schools Cup's annual Rocket League competition.

== Culture ==
St Patrick's College offers a number of cultural programs, including:

- Instrumental and Vocal Music – there are over 20 ensembles ranging from percussion to jazz performing at the college and other events such as the QCMF.
- Chess
- Debating
- Theatresports
- Art Club
- Film Crew (and Junior Film Crew)
- School Musical
- Senior Drama Production
- Tech Crew
- Dance Crew

The college stages biannual senior and junior musicals with another Catholic secondary school, St John Fisher College, and in collaboration with local community theatre company Brisbane Junior Theatre. The most recent senior school musicals were High School Musical (2017), Grease (2019), The Addams Family (2021) and Shrek The Musical (2023). The college also stages biannual dramatic stage play productions, starting with The Ghost of Morven in 2022, an entirely original play based on local folktale about the college. The students of the college also help organise a yearly "Showcase" event where each house competes in a battle of stage performance.

== House system ==
There are nine houses at St Patrick's College:

- Coffey (blue) – named after Brother Coffey, the first principal of the college from 1952 to 1957
- Kennedy (purple) – named after John J. Kennedy, principal of the college from 1995 to 1999
- Mooney (green) – named after Brother Mooney, principal of the college from 1966 to 1971
- O'Rourke (yellow) – named after Father Patrick O'Rourke, the college's founder
- Quane (red) – named after Brother Quane, principal of the college from 1964 to 1965
- Rice (orange) – named after Edmund Ignatius Rice, the catholic missionary who founded the Congregation of Christian Brothers
- Ryan (white) – named after Brother Ryan, principal of the college from 1972 to 1977
- Treacy (teal) – named after Brother Patrick Ambrose Treacy, a prominent Christian Brother in the congregation
- Xavier (maroon) – named after St Francis Xavier, the patron saint of Roman Catholic missions

== Notable alumni ==
Alumni of St Patrick’s College are called Old Boys and can join the St Patrick’s Old Boys' Association (SPCOBA). Notable Old Boys include:

- Jayson Bukuya – former rugby league footballer; represented the Cronulla Sharks, the New Zealand Warriors, and Fiji's national team
- Joseph Champness – footballer for the New Zealand national team and professional rapper JOWIC
- Michael Crocker – former Australian rugby league footballer; represented Queensland and the Australian Kangaroos
- Lolo Fakaosilea – rugby union footballer for the Kintetsu Liners
- Tony Fitzgerald AC KC – former Australian judge; chaired the Fitzgerald Inquiry in Queensland relating to police corruption
- Drew Mitchell – former Australian rugby union footballer; represented the Queensland Reds, the Waratahs, and Australia's national team
- Jesse Mogg – Australian rugby union footballer for the ACT Brumbies
- Dylan Napa – rugby league footballer for the Catalans Dragons
- Jeral Skelton – Australian rugby league footballer for the Canterbury Bulldogs
- Ryan Smith – Australian rugby union footballer for the Queensland Reds
- Cheynee Stiller – former Australian rules footballer; represented the Brisbane Lions
- Corey Wagner – Australian rules footballer
- Josh Wagner – former Australian rules footballer
- Adam White – Australian volleyball player; represented Australia's national team and competed in the 2012 Summer Olympics
- Brendan Whitecross – former Australian rules footballer; represented the Hawthorn Hawks
- Matthew Lydement – Australian weightlifter; competed in the 2020 Summer Olympics
- Brendan Creevey – former Australian cricketer; represented Queensland
- Tim Ryan – Australian rugby union footballer for the Queensland Reds
- Bryan Roe – Australian priest and former professional tennis player

== See also ==
- Catholic education in Australia
- List of schools in Queensland
- List of Christian Brothers schools
