= UTS-UC Hawks Handball Club =

Hawks HC
- Full name: UTS-UC Hawks Handball Club
- Short name: Hawks
- Founded: June 2016
- Head coach: Richard Ridley
- League: Handball League Australia
- Club colours
Home	Away

The UTS-UC Hawks Handball Club is a handball club. It's a joint venture of the UTS Handball Club from the University of Technology Sydney and University of Canberra from Sydney and Canberra, Australia. The team's best result in Handball League Australia is second.

== Records ==
=== Men ===
- Oceania Handball Champions Cup

Second 2017

- Handball League Australia

Second - 2016
Third - 2017
