= Sydney Uni Baseball Club =

Australian baseball club

- Logo

Information
- League: Sydney Winter Baseball League, Pacific Coast Baseball League
- Location: The University of Sydney
- Founded: 1904
- Nickname: Cynics
- Colours: Blue and Gold
- Website: www.sydneybaseball.com

Sydney Uni Baseball Club (SUBC) is an Australian baseball club established in 1904, making it one of the oldest sports clubs in Australia.

Sydney Uni Baseball Club is affiliated with Sydney University Sport and Fitness, which dates back to 1852.

== The History of Sydney Uni Baseball Club ==
The NSW baseball competition was established in 1899, and the club's affiliation was made and the club constituted in 1904.

=== Foundation years ===
1912 SUBC First Grade

In its inaugural season, the Sydney Uni Baseball Club (SUBC) competed in the NSW Baseball Association's (NSWBA) Second Grade division, achieving a 10–2 win-loss record. The club played home games at Rushcutters Bay Oval and trained twice a week on The Square at Sydney University.

=== 1920s ===
1920 SUBC First Grade

In 1923, the club played its first inter-varsity match, sending a team to play against Adelaide University. The club fielded three teams in the New South Wales Baseball Association (NSWBA) for the first time since its inception. In 1926, a triangular series was held between Sydney, Adelaide, and Melbourne universities, with Sydney remaining undefeated. They replicated this success in the following year's series.

In 1927, Jack Mould, then the first-grade captain—after whom the club's MVP trophy is named—was selected to captain the New South Wales (NSW) team. Mould, who received a Blue for baseball, later became a patron of the club from 1941 to 1983, with 60 years of association as a player, administrator, and coach.

In 1928, Sydney University participated in the first international university baseball match in Australia, playing against Stanford University. The match ended with Stanford defeating Sydney 5-2. Following this, Stanford played a combined team consisting of players from Sydney, Melbourne, and Adelaide universities, and defeated the Australians 31-6.

=== 1950s and 1960s ===
Also in 1962, Jeffrey, A. Alderson and F. Hampshire were selected to compete for NSW in the Claxton Shield in Perth. In 1966, the club participated in the inter-varsity competition held in Sydney. Seven universities contested, with all games being played on the two ovals. Sydney was undefeated and won the Hugh J. Ward Cup for the first time since 1957.

== Scholarships ==
Students of The University of Sydney can apply for scholarships while representing the Baseball Club via the Elite Athlete Scholarships.

=== Ron Rushbrooke Scholarship ===
The Ron Rushbrooke trust originated as a bequest from the estate of alumnus Mr. Ron Rushbrooke in 2004, the Club's centenary year, to ensure the viability of baseball at Sydney University.
