= Brendan Creevey =

Australian cricketer (born 1970)

Personal information
- Born: 18 February 1970 (age 56); Charleville, Queensland, Australia
- Source: Cricinfo, 1 October 2020

Brendan Creevey (born 18 February 1970) is an Australian cricketer. He played in 12 first-class and 31 List A matches for Queensland between 1996 and 2001.

Creevey was born in Charleville, Queensland before moving with his family to Augathella and then to Brisbane.

He is now a principal in a school on the gold coast

== See also ==
- List of Queensland first-class cricketers
