= Sydney University Handball Club =

Australian university sports team

Sydney Uni Handball Club
- Full name: Sydney University Handball Club
- Short name: Sydney Uni
- Founded: 1995
- Arena: Sydney University Sports & Aquatic Centre
- Head coach: Chris Scholl
- Captain: Tomasz Piotr Szklarski
- League: Handball League Australia; New South Wales Handball League
- Club colours
| Home | Away |

The Sydney University Handball Club is a handball team from the University of Sydney from Sydney, Australia. They are five times Men's National Champions, eleven times Men's Oceania Champions and qualified for seven IHF Super Globe competitions. The men's team has won the State Championship eleven times. The women's team has also won the State Championship nine times.

== Records ==
=== Men ===
- IHF Super Globe (World Club Championship)

Qualified - 2012, 2013, 2014, 2015, 2016, 2017, 2018, 2019, 2021, 2022, 20242025, and 2026
Best Finish - 4th 2015

- Oceania Handball Champions Cup - 10 titles

Winners - 2011, 2013, 2014, 2015, 2016, 2017, 2018, 2019, 2022, 2024

- Australian Handball Club Championship - 7 titles

Winners - 2014, 2015, 2016, 2017, 2019, 2020, 2022, 2024

- Handball League Australia - 1 title

Winners - 2016
Runner-up- 2017

- Australian University Games

Bronze Medal - 2007

- New South Wales Handball League - 12 titles

Winners - 2018 (Season 1), 2017, 2016, 2015, 2014, 2012, 2009, 2008, 2003, 2002, 2001, 1998

=== Women ===
- New South Wales Handball League - 11 titles

Winners - 2016, 2015, 2014, 2013, 2011, 2010, 2009, 2007, 2005, 2004.

=== Mixed ===
- Australian University Games

Gold Medal - 2011, 2014
Silver Medal - 2012

=== Coaches ===
•Philipp Enders •Lionel Puyhardy •Michael Roth •Srdjan Skercevic •Chris Scholl

=== former players ===
- Bevan Calvert
- Jonathan Lennström
- Tomasz Szklarski
- Kai Dippe
- Zoltan Marczinka
- Stephen Oroszvari
- Peter Bach
- Zeke Desiatnik
- Morten Christiansen
- Christoph Mecker
