= Cavendish Road State High School =

Location
- 695 Cavendish Road; Holland Park, Queensland; Australia; 27.5164°S 153.0729°E

Information
- Type: Public
- Motto: Nil sine pulvere, nil praeter optima (Latin) (Nothing without effort, nothing but the best)
- Established: 1952
- Principal: Richard Usher
- Enrolment: 1251
- Colours: Bottle green and white
- Website: cavendishroadshs.eq.edu.au

Cavendish Road State High School is a co-educational, state secondary school, located at 695 Cavendish Road, Holland Park, Brisbane, Queensland, Australia.

== History ==
Established in 1952, Cavendish Road State High School was the second state high school to be built in the suburbs of Brisbane.

A new sports centre, the Alan Sampson Sports Centre, was opened in September 2019 by Queensland Minister for Education and Industrial Relations Grace Grace. It was named in honour of former principal Alan Sampson, who served from 1997 to 2010.

== Location ==
The school is a short distance from the Brisbane CBD, giving it access to a range of corporations and tertiary education associations.

== Motto and programs ==
The school motto, Nil sine pulvere, nil praeter optima, translates from Latin as "Nothing without effort, nothing but the best".

The school has developed partnerships with the University of Queensland, Griffith University, and the Queensland University of Technology, which allow eligible students to exit Year 12 with credit, fee-free, towards a university degree. A number of relationships with various sporting associations and private businesses (for apprenticeships/traineeships) in Queensland have also been developed.

== Notable alumni ==
- Katrina Gorry, midfielder soccer player for the Australia women's national soccer team
- Paul Harpur (1994–1997), lawyer, academic, Paralympic athlete, namesake of Harpur House at the school
- Loretta Harrop (1988–1992), gold and silver winning olympic triathlete, namesake of Harrop House at the school, and three other members of her family
- Ian Henderson, former state politician
- Dick Johnson, five-time Australian Touring Car Championship, three-time winner of the Bathurst 1000, namesake of Johnson House at the school
- Tahj Minniecon, soccer player for the Loyola Meralco Sparks F.C.
- Stephen Page (1994–1997), choreographer, artistic director of the Bangarra Dance Theatre from 1991 to 2022; namesake of Page House at the school
- Dario Vidošić, soccer player for the Melbourne City FC and as an attacking midfielder for the Australia national football team
- Jesse Williams, defensive tackle and first Australian to win a Super Bowl Ring with the Seattle Seahawks in 2013
- Ella O'Grady, soccer player for the Melbourne Victory FC (women)

== See also ==
- List of schools in Queensland
