= 2016 Australian Handball Club Championship =

The 2016 Australian Handball Club Championship was again split into two categories, with the beach championships held on Coolangatta Beach in conjunction with the 2016 Oceania Beach Handball Championship in February and the indoor held at Geelong, Victoria between June 2–5, 2016 in conjunction with the 2016 Oceania Handball Champions Cup.

The beach titles, held in glorious sunshine on Queensland's Gold Coast, was dominated by New South Wales teams. In the mixed, it was an all New South Wales final with Maroubra Bluebottles beating Harbourside. The women's had Maroubra Bluebottles also winning against defending champions RUOK? from Queensland. The men's saw Victorian side East Melbourne Spartans beat surprise packet Drop Bears from South Australia.

In the indoor event Seven teams from four states and two countries entered the men's division and five teams from three states entered the women's. For the first time there was also a wheelchair category.

== Beach Results ==
=== Men's Final ===
28 February 2016	(Victoria (state)) East Melbourne Spartans	2 legs 0	(South Australia) Drop Bears	Coolangatta Beach

=== Women's Final ===
28 February 2016	(New South Wales) Maroubra Bluebottles	2 legs 1	(Queensland) RUOK?	Coolangatta Beach

=== Mixed Final ===
28 February 2016	(New South Wales) Maroubra Bluebottles	2 legs 0	(New South Wales) Harbourside	Coolangatta Beach

=== University Mixed ===
11 May 2016	University of Western Sydney 2nd	2 legs 0	University of Western Sydney 1st	Tallebudgera Beach, Queensland; Referees: Paul Langenberg
11 May 2016		Report		Tallebudgera Beach, Queensland; Referees: Paul Langenberg

== Results - Men's Indoor ==
=== Round Robin - Pool A ===
Team	Pld	W	D	L	GF	GA	GD	Pts
West Adelaide (SA)	2	2	0	0	52	50	+2	4
St Kilda HC (VIC)	2	1	0	1	58	47	+11	2
Wolves HC (QLD)	2	0	0	2	44	59	−15	0

2 June 2016; 10:50	(South Australia) West Adelaide	27 - 26	(Victoria (state)) St Kilda HC	Corio Leisuretime Center, Geelong - Court 1 Referees: Andrew Kelso, Daniela Diedrich

2 June 2016; 13:10	(Queensland) Wolves HC	20 - 32	(Victoria (state)) St Kilda HC	Corio Leisuretime Center, Geelong - Court 2 Referees: Kiki Lange, Daniela Diedrich

2 June 2016; 16:10	(South Australia) West Adelaide	25 - 24	(Queensland) Wolves HC	Corio Leisuretime Center, Geelong - Court 1 Referees: Jack Duke, Andrew Kelso

=== Round Robin - Pool B ===
Team	Pld	W	D	L	GF	GA	GD	Pts
Sydney University (NSW)	3	3	0	0	122	39	+83	6
University of Technology Sydney (NSW)	3	2	0	1	98	72	+26	4
Olympique de Nouméa	3	1	0	2	51	79	−28	2
Deakin University (VIC)	3	0	0	3	43	107	−64	0

2 June 2016; 9:30	(Victoria (state)) Deakin University	16 - 25	(New Caledonia) Olympique de Nouméa	Corio Leisuretime Center, Geelong - Court 2

2 June 2016; 10:50	(New South Wales) Sydney University	38 - 20	(New South Wales) University of Technology Sydney	Corio Leisuretime Center, Geelong - Court 2 Referees: Freya Brent, Jessica Fearnside

2 June 2016; 13:30	(New South Wales) University of Technology Sydney	35 - 18	(New Caledonia) Olympique de Nouméa	Corio Leisuretime Center, Geelong - Court 1

2 June 2016; 14:50	(New South Wales) Sydney University	39 - 11	(Victoria (state)) Deakin University	Corio Leisuretime Center, Geelong - Court 2 Referees: Vela Vujaklija, Ronny Fifi

3 June 2016; 09:00	(New South Wales) Sydney University	45 - 8	(New Caledonia) Olympique de Nouméa	Corio Leisuretime Center, Geelong - Court 1 Referees: Vela Vujaklija, Ronny Fifi

3 June 2016; 09:00	(New South Wales) University of Technology Sydney	43 - 16	(Victoria (state)) Deakin University	Corio Leisuretime Center, Geelong - Court 2 Referees: Rachel Wilkie, Laura Jetten

=== Fifth-Seventh round robin ===
Team	Pld	W	D	L	GF	GA	GD	Pts
Olympique de Nouméa	2	2	0	0	46	36	+10	4
Wolves HC (QLD)	2	1	0	1	46	46	0	2
Deakin University (VIC)	2	0	0	2	42	50	−8	0

2 June 2016; 9:30	(Victoria (state)) Deakin University	16 - 25	(New Caledonia) Olympique de Nouméa	Corio Leisuretime Center, Geelong - Court 2

3 June 2016; 11:40	(New Caledonia) Olympique de Nouméa	21 - 20	(Queensland) Wolves HC	Corio Leisuretime Center, Geelong - Court 2 Referees: Kiki Lange, Lucia Rehakova

4 June 2016; 13:00	(Victoria (state)) Deakin University	25 - 26	(Queensland) Wolves HC	Corio Leisuretime Center, Geelong - Court 1 Referees: Birte Biehler, Ana Meded

=== Semi Final round robin ===
Team	Pld	W	D	L	GF	GA	GD	Pts
Sydney University (NSW)	3	3	0	0	89	63	+26	6
West Adelaide	3	1	1	1	83	91	−8	3
St Kilda HC (VIC)	3	1	0	2	63	60	+3	2
University of Technology Sydney (NSW)	3	0	1	2	68	87	−19	1

2 June 2016; 10:50	(South Australia) West Adelaide	27 - 26	(Victoria (state)) St Kilda HC	Corio Leisuretime Center, Geelong - Court 1 Referees: Andrew Kelso, Daniela Diedrich

2 June 2016; 10:50	(New South Wales) Sydney University	38 - 20	(New South Wales) University of Technology Sydney	Corio Leisuretime Center, Geelong - Court 2 Referees: Freya Brent, Jessica Fearnside

3 June 2016; 11:40	(New South Wales) University of Technology Sydney	30 - 30	(South Australia) West Adelaide	Corio Leisuretime Center, Geelong - Court 1 Referees: Daniela Diedrich, Ana Meded

3 June 2016; 14:20	(New South Wales) Sydney University	18 - 17	(Victoria (state)) St Kilda HC	Corio Leisuretime Center, Geelong - Court 1

4 June 2016; 10:20	(New South Wales) University of Technology Sydney	18 - 19	(Victoria (state)) St Kilda HC	Corio Leisuretime Center, Geelong - Court 1
4 June 2016; 10:20		(10-7)		Corio Leisuretime Center, Geelong - Court 1

4 June 2016; 14:20	(New South Wales) Sydney University	35 - 26	(South Australia) West Adelaide	Corio Leisuretime Center, Geelong - Court 1
4 June 2016; 14:20		(25-12)		Corio Leisuretime Center, Geelong - Court 1

=== Fifth Place Play off ===
4 June 2016; 13:00	(New Caledonia) Olympique de Nouméa	15 - 23	(Queensland) Wolves HC	Corio Leisuretime Center, Geelong - Court 1 Referees: Birte Biehler, Ana Meded

=== Third Place play off ===
5 June 2016; 10:20	(New South Wales) University of Technology Sydney	26 - 37	(Victoria (state)) St Kilda HC	Corio Leisuretime Center, Geelong - Court 1

=== Final ===
5 June 2016; 13:30	(New South Wales) Sydney University	30 - 18	(South Australia) West Adelaide	Corio Leisuretime Center, Geelong - Court 1 Referees: Andrew Kelso, Pavol Rydl
5 June 2016; 13:30		(17-10)		Corio Leisuretime Center, Geelong - Court 1 Referees: Andrew Kelso, Pavol Rydl

=== Final standings - Men ===
Classification
1st place, gold medalist(s)	(New South Wales) Sydney University
2nd place, silver medalist(s)	(South Australia) West Adelaide
3rd place, bronze medalist(s)	(Victoria (state)) St Kilda HC
4	(New South Wales) University of Technology Sydney
5	(Queensland) Wolves HC
6	(New Caledonia) Olympique de Nouméa
7	(Victoria (state)) Deakin University

== Results - Women's Indoor ==
=== Round robin ===
Team	Pld	W	D	L	GF	GA	GD	Pts
Melbourne (VIC)	4	4	0	0	113	62	+51	8
University of Technology Sydney (NSW)	4	3	0	1	105	78	+27	6
University of Queensland (QLD)	4	2	0	2	96	84	+12	4
Sydney University (NSW)	4	1	0	3	57	79	−22	2
Southside (VIC)	4	0	0	4	56	113	−57	0

2 June 2016; 09:30	(New South Wales) Sydney University	16 - 11	(Victoria (state)) Southside	Corio Leisuretime Center, Geelong - Court 1 Referees: Ana Meded, Vanja Smiljanic

2 June 2016; 12:10	(New South Wales) University of Queensland	19 - 23	(Victoria (state)) Melbourne	Corio Leisuretime Center, Geelong - Court 1 Referees: Chris Ducourant, Thomas Gertsch

2 June 2016; 12:10	(New South Wales) University of Technology Sydney	38 - 13	(Victoria (state)) Southside	Corio Leisuretime Center, Geelong - Court 2 Referees: Chris Ducourant, Thomas Gertsch

3 June 2016; 10:20	(Victoria (state)) Melbourne	39 - 12	(Victoria (state)) Southside	Corio Leisuretime Center, Geelong - Court 1

3 June 2016; 12:10	(New South Wales) Sydney University	17 - 24	University of Queensland	Corio Leisuretime Center, Geelong - Court 2 Referees: Andrew Kelso, Jack Duke

3 June 2016; 13:00	(New South Wales) University of Technology Sydney	24 - 23	University of Queensland	Corio Leisuretime Center, Geelong - Court 1

3 June 2016; 15:40	(New South Wales) University of Technology Sydney	19 - 30	(Victoria (state)) Melbourne	Corio Leisuretime Center, Geelong - Court 1

4 June 2016; 09:00	(New South Wales) Sydney University	12 - 21	(Victoria (state)) Melbourne	Corio Leisuretime Center, Geelong - Court 1 Referees: Pavol Rydl, Stephane Tabardin
4 June 2016; 09:00		(10-6)		Corio Leisuretime Center, Geelong - Court 1 Referees: Pavol Rydl, Stephane Tabardin

4 June 2016; 11:40	(New South Wales) University of Queensland	30 - 20	(Victoria (state)) Southside	Corio Leisuretime Center, Geelong - Court 1
4 June 2016; 11:40		(16-13)		Corio Leisuretime Center, Geelong - Court 1

4 June 2016; 15:40	(New South Wales) Sydney University	12-23	(Victoria (state)) University of Technology Sydney	Corio Leisuretime Center, Geelong - Court 1
4 June 2016; 15:40		(7-11)		Corio Leisuretime Center, Geelong - Court 1

=== Third Place play off ===
5 June 2016; 09:00	University of Queensland	26 - 12	(New South Wales) Sydney University	Corio Leisuretime Center, Geelong - Court 1 Referees: Richard Ridley, Robert Ridley

=== Final ===
5 June 2016; 11:40	(Victoria (state)) Melbourne	24 - 17	(Queensland) University of Technology Sydney	Corio Leisuretime Center, Geelong - Court 1 Referees: Stephane Tabardin, Fabien
5 June 2016; 11:40		(11-9)		Corio Leisuretime Center, Geelong - Court 1 Referees: Stephane Tabardin, Fabien

=== Final standings - Women ===
Classification
1st place, gold medalist(s)	(Victoria (state)) Melbourne HC
2nd place, silver medalist(s)	(New South Wales) University of Technology Sydney
3rd place, bronze medalist(s)	University of Queensland
4	(New South Wales) Sydney University
5	(Victoria (state)) Southside

== Australian Handball League ==
See main page 2016 Australian Handball League

== External references ==
- 2016 Australian Beach Handball Championships. Change her game. 25 Feb, 2016
- 2016 Beach titles. Beach titles report. WHM Magazine pages 64-65.
- Competition details on Handball Australia webpage
- NSW CLUBS TO COMPETE IN AUSTRALIAN CHAMPIONSHIPS. NSWHF webpage. 31 May 2016.
- Geelong ready to host Australian club championships. Handball Australia. 1 June 2016.
- Sydney University aiming to defend title. 2 June 2016.
- Draw on Handball Victoria Webpage
- Day three report. Handball Australia. 4 June 2016.
