= 2016 Oceania Handball Champions Cup =

The 2016 Oceania Handball Champions Cup was held at Geelong, Victoria between June 2–5, 2016 in conjunction with the 2016 Australian Handball Club Championship.

In the event has seven teams from Australia and New Caledonia entered. The Australian teams dominated with Sydney University winning their fifth straight title over West Adelaide. Two time runners up St Kilda HC came third from University of Technology Sydney in fourth. Surprise packet Wolves HC consisting of mainly of the Australian Junior team players finished fifth, with Olympique de Nouméa sixth and Deakin University seventh.

== Results ==
=== Round Robin - Pool A ===
Team	Pld	W	D	L	GF	GA	GD	Pts
West Adelaide (SA)	2	2	0	0	52	50	+2	4
St Kilda HC (VIC)	2	1	0	1	58	47	+11	2
Wolves HC (QLD)	2	0	0	2	44	59	−15	0

2 June 2016; 10:50	(South Australia) West Adelaide	27 - 26	(Victoria (state)) St Kilda HC	Corio Leisuretime Center, Geelong - Court 1 Referees: Andrew Kelso, Daniela Diedrich

2 June 2016; 13:10	(Queensland) Wolves HC	20 - 32	(Victoria (state)) St Kilda HC	Corio Leisuretime Center, Geelong - Court 2 Referees: Kiki Lange, Daniela Diedrich

2 June 2016; 16:10	(South Australia) West Adelaide	25 - 24	(Queensland) Wolves HC	Corio Leisuretime Center, Geelong - Court 1 Referees: Jack Duke, Andrew Kelso

=== Round Robin - Pool B ===
Team	Pld	W	D	L	GF	GA	GD	Pts
Sydney University (NSW)	3	3	0	0	122	39	+83	6
University of Technology Sydney (NSW)	3	2	0	1	98	72	+26	4
Olympique de Nouméa	3	1	0	2	51	79	−28	2
Deakin University (VIC)	3	0	0	3	43	107	−64	0

2 June 2016; 9:30	(Victoria (state)) Deakin University	16 - 25	(New Caledonia) Olympique de Nouméa	Corio Leisuretime Center, Geelong - Court 2

2 June 2016; 10:50	(New South Wales) Sydney University	38 - 20	(New South Wales) University of Technology Sydney	Corio Leisuretime Center, Geelong - Court 2 Referees: Freya Brent, Jessica Fearnside

2 June 2016; 13:30	(New South Wales) University of Technology Sydney	35 - 18	(New Caledonia) Olympique de Nouméa	Corio Leisuretime Center, Geelong - Court 1

2 June 2016; 14:50	(New South Wales) Sydney University	39 - 11	(Victoria (state)) Deakin University	Corio Leisuretime Center, Geelong - Court 2 Referees: Vela Vujaklija, Ronny Fifi

3 June 2016; 09:00	(New South Wales) Sydney University	45 - 8	(New Caledonia) Olympique de Nouméa	Corio Leisuretime Center, Geelong - Court 1 Referees: Vela Vujaklija, Ronny Fifi

3 June 2016; 09:00	(New South Wales) University of Technology Sydney	43 - 16	(Victoria (state)) Deakin University	Corio Leisuretime Center, Geelong - Court 2 Referees: Rachel Wilkie, Laura Jetten

=== Fifth-Seventh round robin ===
Team	Pld	W	D	L	GF	GA	GD	Pts
Olympique de Nouméa	2	2	0	0	46	36	+10	4
Wolves HC (QLD)	2	1	0	1	46	46	0	2
Deakin University (VIC)	2	0	0	2	42	50	−8	0

2 June 2016; 9:30	(Victoria (state)) Deakin University	16 - 25	(New Caledonia) Olympique de Nouméa	Corio Leisuretime Center, Geelong - Court 2

3 June 2016; 11:40	(New Caledonia) Olympique de Nouméa	21 - 20	(Queensland) Wolves HC	Corio Leisuretime Center, Geelong - Court 2 Referees: Kiki Lange, Lucia Rehakova

4 June 2016; 13:00	(Victoria (state)) Deakin University	25 - 26	(Queensland) Wolves HC	Corio Leisuretime Center, Geelong - Court 1 Referees: Birte Biehler, Ana Meded

=== Semi Final round robin ===
Team	Pld	W	D	L	GF	GA	GD	Pts
Sydney University (NSW)	3	3	0	0	89	63	+26	6
West Adelaide	3	1	1	1	83	91	−8	3
St Kilda HC (VIC)	3	1	0	2	63	60	+3	2
University of Technology Sydney (NSW)	3	0	1	2	68	87	−19	1

2 June 2016; 10:50	(South Australia) West Adelaide	27 - 26	(Victoria (state)) St Kilda HC	Corio Leisuretime Center, Geelong - Court 1 Referees: Andrew Kelso, Daniela Diedrich

2 June 2016; 10:50	(New South Wales) Sydney University	38 - 20	(New South Wales) University of Technology Sydney	Corio Leisuretime Center, Geelong - Court 2 Referees: Freya Brent, Jessica Fearnside

3 June 2016; 11:40	(New South Wales) University of Technology Sydney	30 - 30	(South Australia) West Adelaide	Corio Leisuretime Center, Geelong - Court 1 Referees: Daniela Diedrich, Ana Meded

3 June 2016; 14:20	(New South Wales) Sydney University	18 - 17	(Victoria (state)) St Kilda HC	Corio Leisuretime Center, Geelong - Court 1

4 June 2016; 10:20	(New South Wales) University of Technology Sydney	18 - 19	(Victoria (state)) St Kilda HC	Corio Leisuretime Center, Geelong - Court 1
4 June 2016; 10:20		(10-7)		Corio Leisuretime Center, Geelong - Court 1

4 June 2016; 14:20	(New South Wales) Sydney University	35 - 26	(South Australia) West Adelaide	Corio Leisuretime Center, Geelong - Court 1
4 June 2016; 14:20		(25-12)		Corio Leisuretime Center, Geelong - Court 1

=== Fifth Place Play off ===
4 June 2016; 13:00	(New Caledonia) Olympique de Nouméa	15 - 23	(Queensland) Wolves HC	Corio Leisuretime Center, Geelong - Court 1 Referees: Birte Biehler, Ana Meded

=== Third Place playoff ===
5 June 2016; 10:20	(New South Wales) University of Technology Sydney	26 - 37	(Victoria (state)) St Kilda HC	Corio Leisuretime Center, Geelong - Court 1

=== Final ===
5 June 2016; 13:30	(New South Wales) Sydney University	30 - 18	(South Australia) West Adelaide	Corio Leisuretime Center, Geelong - Court 1 Referees: Andrew Kelso, Pavol Rydl
5 June 2016; 13:30		(17-10)		Corio Leisuretime Center, Geelong - Court 1 Referees: Andrew Kelso, Pavol Rydl

=== Final standings - Men ===
Classification
1st place, gold medalist(s)	(Australia) Sydney University
2nd place, silver medalist(s)	(Australia) West Adelaide
3rd place, bronze medalist(s)	(Australia) Saint Kilda Handball Club
4	(Australia) University of Technology Sydney
5	(Australia) Wolves HC
6	(New Caledonia) Olympique de Nouméa
7	(Australia) Deakin University

== External references ==
- Competition details on Handball Australia webpage
- NSW CLUBS TO COMPETE IN AUSTRALIAN CHAMPIONSHIPS. NSWHF webpage. 31 May 2016.
- Geelong ready to host Oceania club championships. Handball Australia. 1 June 2016.
- Sydney University aiming to defend title. 2 June 2016.
- Draw on Handball Victoria Webpage
- Day three report. Handball Australia. 4 June 2016.
