= Handball League Australia =

- Founded: 2016
- No. of teams: 4
- Country: Australia
- Confederation: OCHF
- Most recent champion: St Kilda HBC (2017)
- Most titles: Sydney University & St Kilda HBC (1 title)
- Level on pyramid: 1
- Website: Website
- 2020 Handball League Australia

The Handball League Australia (HLA) was an Australian-based championship for handball run by Australian Handball Federation. The principal idea was to play round robin games in each capital city. There are four teams representing four states.

== Season ==
In the first season four rounds were planned but the third round was cancelled. The season starts in June and ends in December. Each team plays two matches against every other team.

== Teams ==
The four teams of the 2016 season were:

Locations of the 2017 Handball League Australian teams

Team	Location	Arena	Capacity
Brisbane Wolves	Brisbane		
UTS-UC Hawks Handball Club	Sydney; Canberra	Australian Institute of Sport	
Saint Kilda Handball Club	St Kilda	Leisuretime Centre	
Sydney University Handball Club	Sydney	Sydney University Sports & Aquatic Centre	

== Champions ==
The complete list of the Handball League Australia champions since 2016:

Year	Venue	Winner	Runner-up	3rd Place	4th Place
2016	Various	Sydney University	Hawks HC	St Kilda HBC	Brisbane Wolves
2017	Various	St Kilda HBC	Sydney University	Hawks HC	Brisbane Wolves

Men's medal count

Rank	Team	Gold	Silver	Bronze	Total
1	Sydney University	1	1	0	2
2	St Kilda HBC	1	0	1	2
3	Hawks HC	0	1	1	2
Totals (3 entries)		2	2	2	6

== See also ==
- Australian Handball Federation
