= Australian Handball Club Championship =

Handball Australia hosts two separate national club championships. The first is a Beach Handball nationals competition and the second is the Australia Handball Club Championships featuring the state champions for Handball. The winner of the Handball Club Championships qualifies to represent Australia in the Oceania Handball Champions Cup.

The inaugural winner of the Handball Club Championships competition was New South Wales based Sydney Uni over Victorian based St Kilda HC. The tournament was held at Sydney Olympic Park and featured teams from New South Wales, Victoria and Queensland.

The inaugural winners of the beach competition for men was won by the East Melbourne Spartans from Victoria. The women's and the mixed event was won by Tang from New South Wales.

== Champions ==
=== Men's Handball ===
Year	Venue	Final			Third Place Match		
Year	Venue	Winner	Score	Runner-up	3rd Place	Score	4th Place
2014	Sydney Olympic Park	Sydney University	34–28	St. Kilda HC	Hill Heat	24–17	Logan Wizards
2015	Sydney Olympic Park	Sydney University	47–36 two legs	St. Kilda HC	Canberra HC	round robin	University of Queensland
2016	Geelong, Victoria	Sydney University	30-18	West Adelaide	St. Kilda HC	37-26	University of Technology Sydney
2017	Geelong, Victoria	Sydney University	30-24	University of Technology Sydney	St. Kilda HC	32-23	Brisbane Wolves
2018	Geelong, Victoria	Sydney University	30-14	University of Technology Sydney	University of Queensland	24-23	St. Kilda HC
2019	Gold Coast, Queensland	Sydney University	33-32	University of Queensland	Handball SA	35-27	St. Kilda HC
2020	Cancelled due to COVID-19 pandemic						
2021	Gold Coast, Queensland	University of Queensland	27-17	St. Kilda HC	Brisbane Handball Club	27-17	University of South Australia
2022	Gold Coast, Queensland	Sydney University	26-21	University of Queensland	Canberra HC	20-18	University of Technology Sydney
2023	Canberra, ACT	University of Queensland	31-25	St. Kilda HC	Sydney University	23-17	Canberra HC
2024	Canberra, ACT	Sydney University	23-20	University of Queensland	St. Kilda HC	34-31	University of Technology Sydney
2025	Coffs Harbour, New South Wales	Sydney University	30–19	University of Queensland	Canberra HC	32–22	St. Kilda HC
2026	Coffs Harbour, New South Wales	Sydney University	40–22	Canberra HC	University of Technology Sydney	32–31	St. Kilda HC

=== Women's Handball ===
Year	Venue	Final			Third Place Match		
Year	Venue	Winner	Score	Runner-up	3rd Place	Score	4th Place
2016	Geelong, Victoria	Melbourne HC	24 - 17	University of Technology Sydney	University of Queensland	26 - 12	Sydney University
2017	Geelong, Victoria	AS Dumbea	24 - 17	Melbourne HC	University of Technology Sydney	24 - 20	Auckland Region
2018	Geelong, Victoria	Melbourne HC	18 - 13	University of Queensland	Handball West	25 - 13	JS Mont Dore
2019	Gold Coast, Queensland	University of Queensland	18 - 11	Melbourne HC	University of Technology Sydney	-	No match played
2020	Cancelled due to COVID-19 pandemic						
2021	Gold Coast, Queensland	Canberra HC		UTS	Brisbane HC		
2022	Gold Coast, Queensland	Sydney University	28 - 15	Canberra HC	University of Technology Sydney	23 - 16	Brisbane HC
2023	Canberra, ACT	Sydney University	25 - 20	University of Technology Sydney	Brisbane HC	No match played, group ranking used	Canberra HC
2024	Canberra, ACT	University of Queensland	28 - 24	Sydney University	Melbourne HC	26 - 15	Canberra HC
2025	Coffs Harbour, New South Wales	University of Queensland	20 – 13	University of Technology Sydney	Canberra HC	26 – 22	Sydney University
2026	Coffs Harbour, New South Wales	University of Queensland	20 – 12	University of Technology Sydney	Sydney University	No match played, round robin	

=== Men's Beach Handball ===
Year	Venue	Final			Third Place Match		
Year	Venue	Winner	Score	Runner-up	3rd Place	Score	4th Place
2011	Kirra Beach	Monash Grey	unknown	Monash Blue	unknown	unknown	unknown
2012	St Kilda Beach	Brisbane Tigers	2 legs 0	Australian Capital Territory	unknown	unknown	unknown
2013	Maroubra Beach	unknown	unknown	unknown	unknown	unknown	unknown
2014	Scarborough Beach	East Melbourne Spartans (VIC)	2 legs 0	Tang (NSW)	WA Gold (WA)	2 legs 0	NT Harbourside (NT, NSW, ACT)
2015	Glenelg Beach	St Kilda HC (VIC)	2 legs 0	East Melbourne Spartans (VIC)	Melbourne Kicks (VIC)	unknown	unknown
2016	Coolangatta Beach	East Melbourne Spartans (VIC)	2 legs 0	Drop Bears (SA)	unknown	unknown	unknown
2017	Glenelg Beach	East Melbourne Spartans (VIC)	unknown	Maroubra Bluebottles (NSW)	SA Vikings (SA)	unknown	unknown
2018	Glenelg Beach						
2019	Glenelg Beach						
2020	Coolangatta Beach						
2021	Coolangatta Beach						
2022	Coolangatta Beach						
2023	Coolangatta Beach						

=== Women's Beach Handball ===
Year	Venue	Final			Third Place Match		
Year	Venue	Winner	Score	Runner-up	3rd Place	Score	4th Place
2011	Kirra Beach	South Coast (NSW)	unknown	UTS II	unknown	unknown	unknown
2012	St Kilda Beach	New South Wales	2 legs 0	Western Australia	unknown	unknown	unknown
2013	Maroubra Beach	unknown	unknown	unknown	unknown	unknown	unknown
2014	Scarborough Beach	Tang (NSW)	2 legs 0	Melbourne BHC (VIC)	WA Foxes (WA)	2 legs 0	SA Sharknados (SA)
2015	Glenelg Beach	RUOK (QLD)	2 legs 0	S Betta (NSW)	Sharknachos (SA)	unknown	unknown
2016	Coolangatta Beach	Maroubra Bluebottles (NSW)	2 legs 1	RUOK (QLD)	unknown	unknown	unknown
2017	Glenelg Beach	Maroubra Bluebottles (NSW)	unknown	RUOK (QLD)	The Beachsters (VIC)	unknown	unknown
2018	Glenelg Beach						
2019	Glenelg Beach						
2020	Coolangatta Beach						
2021	Coolangatta Beach						
2022	Coolangatta Beach						
2023	Coolangatta Beach						

=== Mixed Beach ===
Year	Venue	Final			Third Place Match		
Year	Venue	Winner	Score	Runner-up	3rd Place	Score	4th Place
2012	St Kilda Beach	New South Wales	2 legs 0	Monash University (VIC)	unknown	unknown	unknown
2013	Maroubra Beach	unknown	unknown	unknown	unknown	unknown	unknown
2014	Scarborough Beach	Tang (NSW)	2 legs 0	NT Harbourside (NT/NSW/ACT)	Monash (VIC)	2 legs 1	WA Vipers (WA)
2015	Glenelg Beach	Spinners	2 legs 0	S Betta (NSW)	Monash University (VIC)	unknown	Wildfire Tigersharks (SA)
2016	Coolangatta Beach	Maroubra Bluebottles (NSW)	2 legs 0	Harbourside (NSW)	unknown	unknown	unknown
2017	Glenelg Beach	Parrots (NZ/QLD)	unknown	Maroubra Bluebottles (NSW)	Made In France (VIC)	unknown	unknown

=== Men's wheelchair ===
Year	Venue	Final			Third Place Match		
Year	Venue	Winner	Score	Runner-up	3rd Place	Score	4th Place
2017	Geelong, Victoria	Darebin City WHC (VIC)	unknown	Coconut WHC (VIC)	only two teams		

== Handball League Australia ==
See main article - Handball League Australia

== See also ==
- Australian Handball Federation
- Handball League Australia
- Oceania Handball Champions Cup
