= Brisbane Handball Club =

- Full name: Brisbane European Handball Club
- Short name: BHC
- Founded: 2018
- Arena: Balmoral State High School and Nissan Arena
- Capacity: 200
- President: David Gillespie
- League: Queensland Handball League; Australian Handball Club Championship
- Club colours

The Brisbane Handball Club is a handball club based in Brisbane, Australia. The club offers handball programs for children and adults across all skill levels and operates all year round.

Membership is available for a school term or on a casual basis.

JUNIORS/SENIORS (Age 15+) The senior club trains and plays at Nissan Arena

YOUTH (10-15) Youth players (10-15) come from all over Brisbane to train and play mixed handball on Sundays at Balmoral State High School. The club has Australia's only dedicated youth European Handball club, fostering future Olympians!

OLYMPICS 2032 With Australia hosting the 2032 2032 Olympics, every sport on the 2032 program is automatically granted qualification!

The club is affiliated with Handball Australia, Handball Queensland, and plays in the Brisbane Handball League.

== Accomplishments ==
National

- 2023 National Championships, Canberra
- 2024 Official Olympics Live Site, Brisbane
- 2024 National Championships, Gold Coast
- 2025 Handball Cup Tournament, Brisbane

International

- 2023 Interamnia World Cup, Italy
- 2024 Interamnia World Cup, Italy
- 2024 National Club Championships, Wellington NZ
- 2025 California Cup, USA
- 2025 Partille World Cup, Sweden

== See also ==
- Queensland Handball League
- Australian Handball Club Championship
