= University of Queensland Handball Club =

University of Queensland
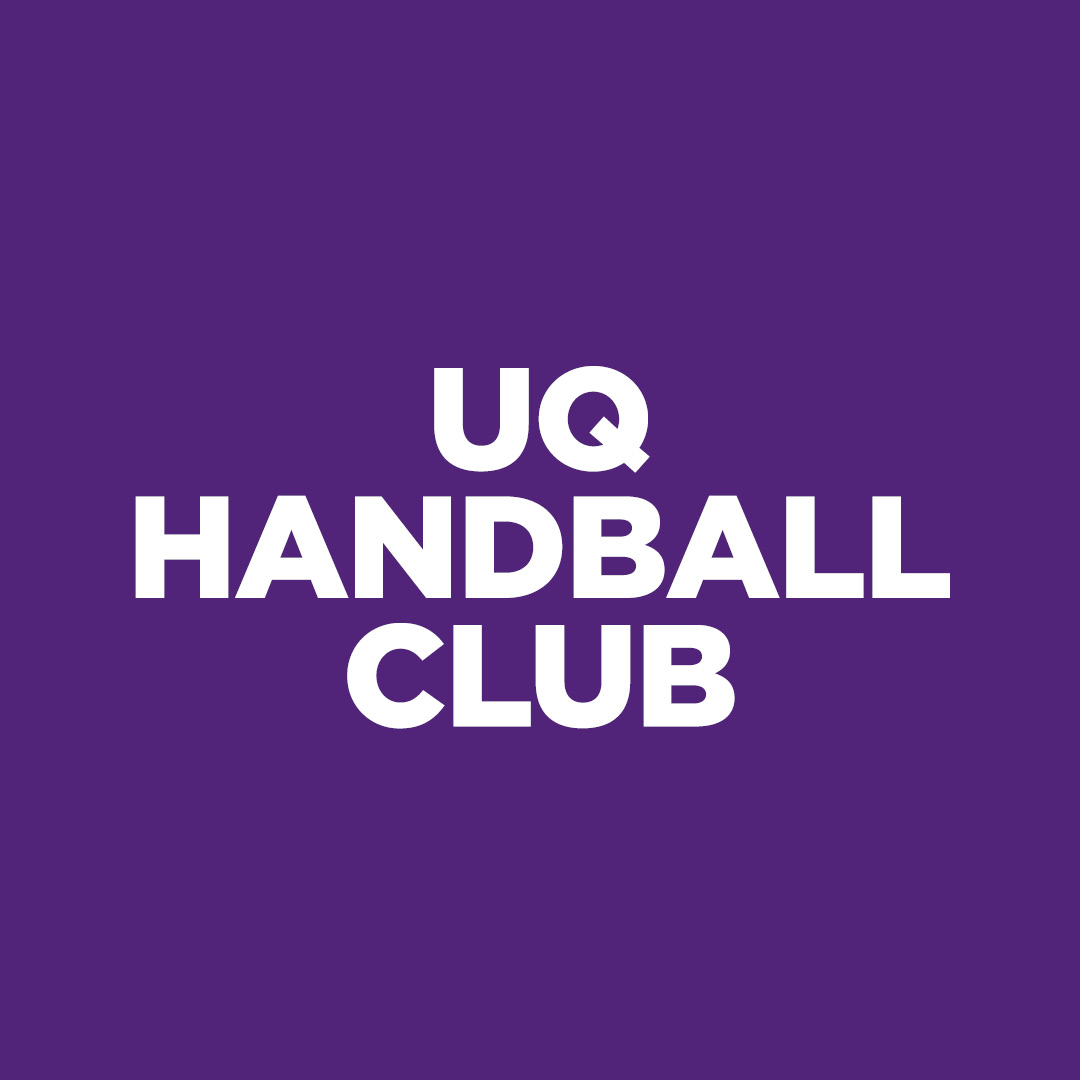
- Full name: University of Queensland Handball Club
- Founded: 1992
- Arena: UQ Sport Fitness Centre
- President: Jack Neubecker
- Head coach: Juan Santiago and Mayuko Kanda
- League: Queensland Handball League; Australian Handball Club Championship
- Club colours

The University of Queensland Handball Club is based in Brisbane, Queensland, Australia. The club has been affiliated with the University of Queensland since 1992. The club consists of a combination of UQ domestic and international students, non university members and youth players.

== Club history ==
The University of Queensland Handball Club was founded in 1992. Collectively, the men's and women's teams have won the Queensland Handball League fifteen times, which includes both teams success in the latest competition in 2024.

The main events for the club include the Australian Handball Club Championship and high participation of club members at the Australian National Handball Championship.

The club's men's and women's teams consistently perform highly at the main event of the year Australian Handball Club Championship.

Australian Handball Club Championship Results
	Men's	Women's
2015	4th	Did not appear
2016	Did not appear	Bronze
2018	Bronze	Silver
2019	Silver	Gold
2020	No competition due to Covid-19	
2021	Gold	Did not appear
2022	Silver	Did not appear
2023	Gold	Did not appear
2024	Silver	Gold
2025	Silver	Gold

In 2019, the women's team represented Australia at the first ever IHF Women's Super Globe in Wuxi, China placing seventh out of eight clubs competing. Long standing club member, Jemima Harbort, received MVP as a goalkeeper in one of the games. They qualified by winning the National Championship on the Gold Coast in June 2019.

2023 saw the UQ Handball Men's team qualify for the 2023 IHF Men's Super Globe in Saudi Arabia at the Australian Handball Club Championship in 2023.

The University of Queensland Handball Club has also participated in the mixed Australian University Games.

Australian University Games Results
2013	Silver
2018	Gold
2019	Gold
2024	Gold

== State representation ==
The University of Queensland Handball club has strong state representation in both men's and women's teams.

Senior Queensland teams have consisted of majority University of Queensland handball players during recent years, with the men's Queensland Team in 2024 consisting entirely of University of Queensland players.

The Queensland women's state handball team won gold at the Australian National Handball Championship in 2010, 2013, 2014, 2017, 2022, 2023, and 2024, while placing 2nd at the 2025 Australian National Handball Championship.

Queensland men's team won gold at the Australian National Handball Championship in 2014, 2018, 2024 and 2025.

== National team representation ==
The University of Queensland Handball Club also has a high number of current and past members that have been involved with multiple nations national teams.

The most recent men's 2026 Asian Men's Handball Championship hosted in Kuwait in January 2026 saw five current and two past members of the University of Queensland Handball Club compete with the Australia men's national handball team.

One current and two past University of Queensland Handball Club members also represented Australia at their most recent appearance at the 2019 World Women's Handball Championship.

== Youth handball ==
The University of Queensland Handball Club has recently invested in a youth club, accommodating for ages 6 to 15.

== Beach handball ==
Beach Handball at the University of Queensland Handball Club is a developing side of the club that saw its first mixed team participate at the Australian Beach Handball National Championships in Coolangatta in 2024.

Many current and past club members are or have not only represented Queensland at the Australian Beach Handball National Championships, but have represented various countries such as Australia, New Zealand, and Japan at international beach handball tournaments.

== See also ==
- Queensland Handball League
- Australian Handball Club Championship
- Handball League Australia
