= UTS Library =

University library in Sydney, Australia

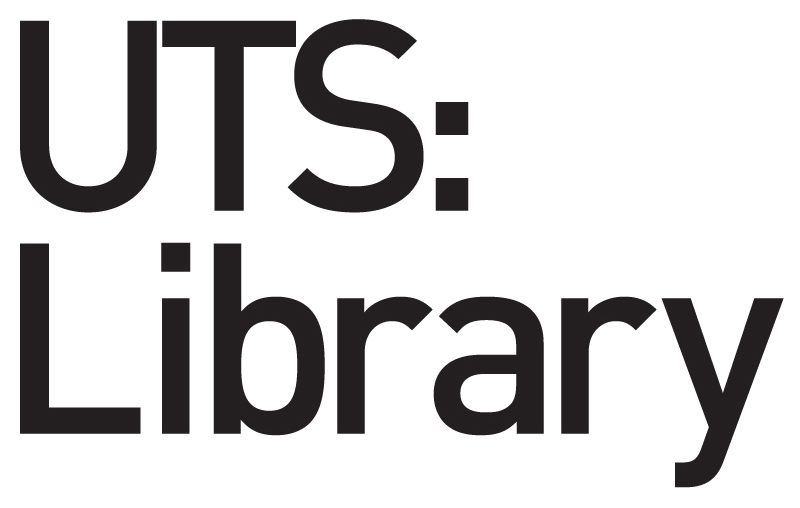
- Location: Sydney, Australia
- Type: Academic library
- Established: 1988

Access and use
- Population served: 49,825 (2018)

Other information
- Director: Michael Gonzalez (2018–)
- Employees: 110
- Website: lib.uts.edu.au

The UTS Library is a library for teaching, learning, and research needs for the students, teachers and staff of University of Technology Sydney (UTS). The library is located in Building 2 next to the UTS Tower and opposite Central Park on Broadway, across Levels 5 - 9 within UTS Central. The main entrance to the new UTS Library is on Level 7 of UTS Central. The UTS Library also has study spaces, academic support, and services across various levels of UTS Central.

== History ==
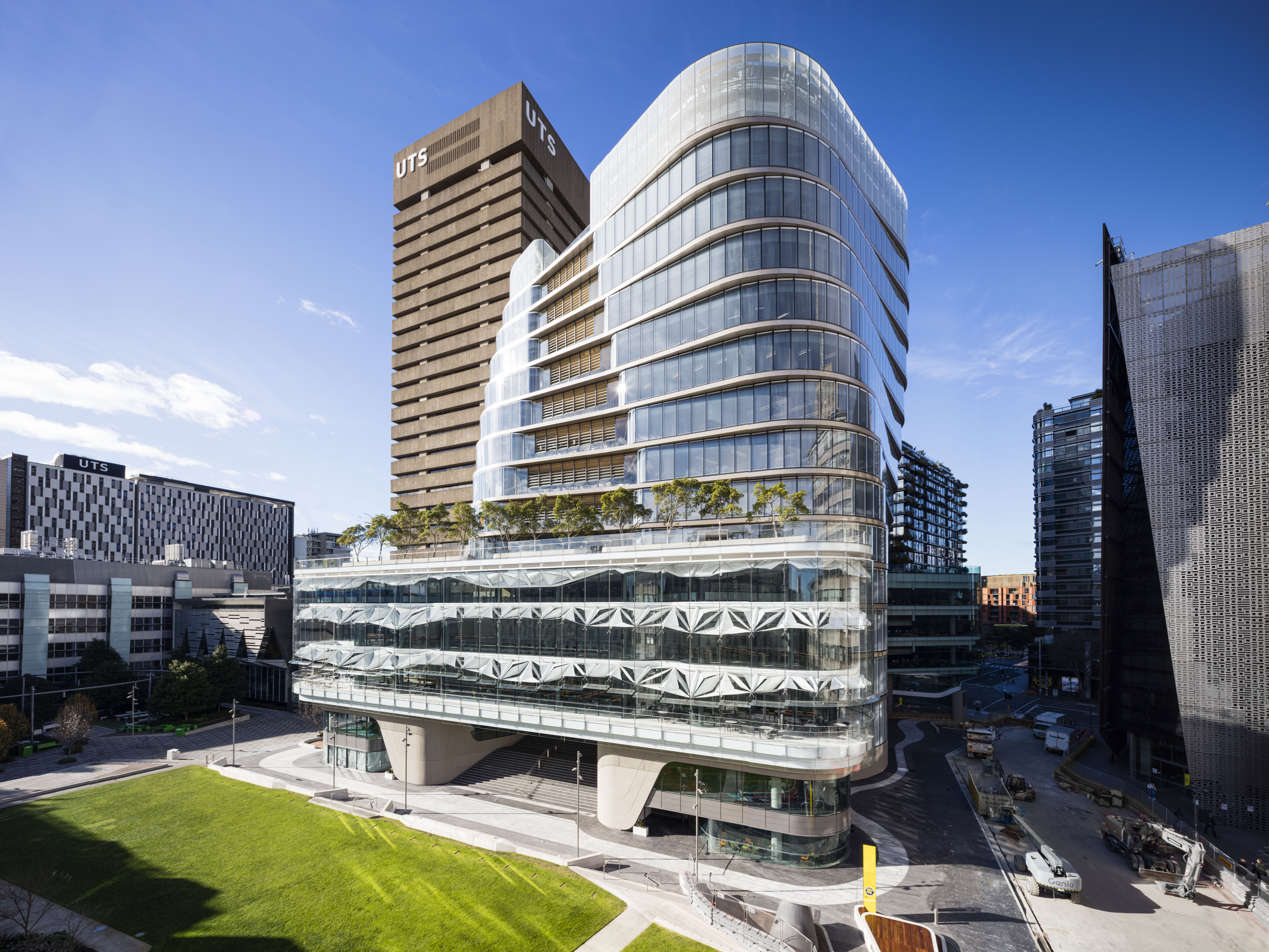
UTS Central as viewed from Alumni Green (Broadway), University of Technology Sydney

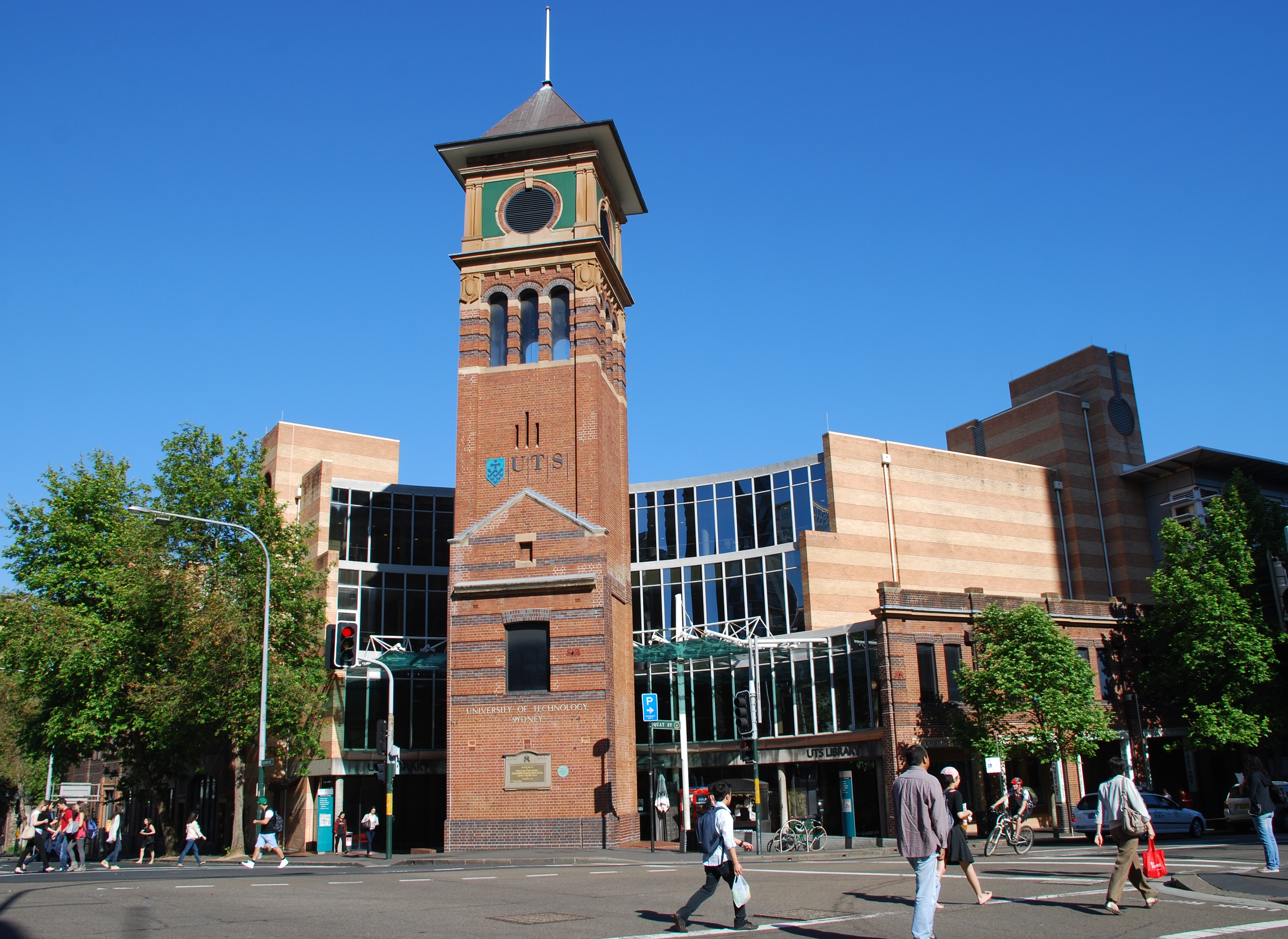
Blake Library (Haymarket Campus), University of Technology Sydney

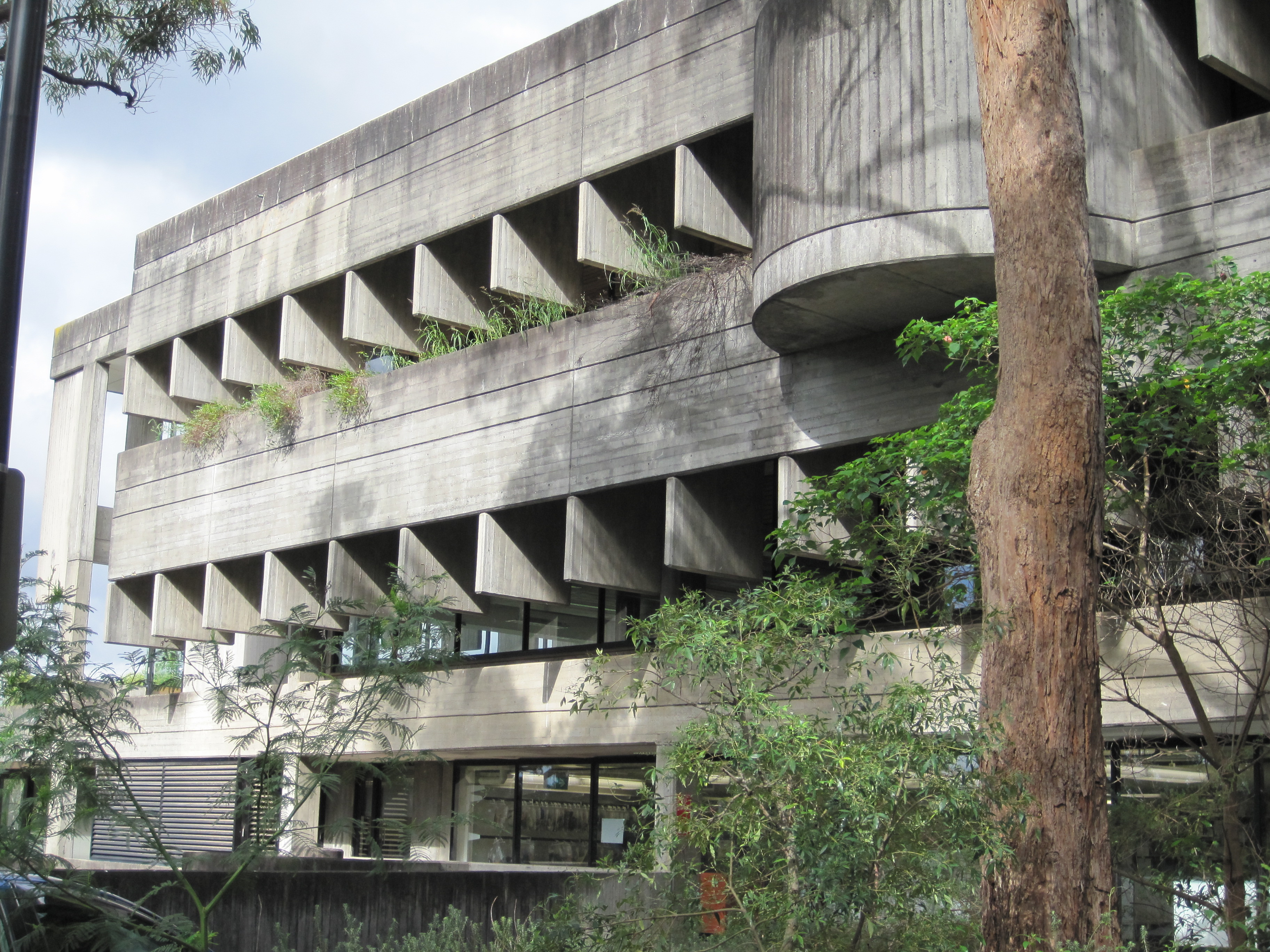
George Muir Library (Kuring-gai Campus), University of Technology Sydney

The University of Technology Sydney was originally known as the New South Wales Institute of Technology (1965–1988). At that time, library services were provided through the libraries of the Sydney Technical College (STC) and at the East Sydney Technical College (ESTC) from 1965 to 1971.

Other library services were established in:

- 1971 – Gore Hill Library opened in the Dunbar Building, Gore Hill.
- 1972 – James N. Kirby Library (Brickfield Hill) opened in the Anthony Hordern Building in George Street, Brickfield Hill.
- 1976 – Broadway Library opened and was located on the top floor of Building 4, Harris Street, Broadway.
- 1984 – Markets Library, Ultimo which was renamed the Blake Library (City Campus) in 2002 after Professor Tony Blake a past UTS Vice-Chancellor.
- 1990 – George Muir Library (Kuring-gai Campus) was named after the founding principal of the Kuring-gai College of Advanced Education.
- 2019 – Blake Library relocates to UTS Central at Broadway, Ultimo.

The Markets Library was the University's first purpose-built library. Originally planned to replace the Brickfield Hill Library, it was large enough to also house the Broadway Library collection. The architect Philip Cox, effectively combined old brickwork and the bell tower of the Sydney Markets into the design of the new building. The restored bell tower stands sentinel outside the library. The Kuring-gai Campus Library was closed in late 2015 as UTS consolidated services at the city campus.

=== University librarians ===
There have been five University librarians at UTS Library:

- Dorothy Peake
- Steve O'Connor
- Dr Alex Byrne
- Mal Booth
- Michael Gonzalez

== Architectural features ==
UTS Library has two balconies and offers access across 3 floors of the building. Some of the collection is available in the UTS Reading Room which is separate to the Library. This is a large traditional reading room available for quiet study.

== Facilities ==
The library has individual and group study areas, silent study rooms, discussion and group presentation rooms, assistive technology rooms with adaptive equipment and software, a Scholars' center for postgraduate research students and staff, express catalogues and self-service loans machines. Internet access for mobile devices and laptops is available throughout the library, as well as printing and photocopying services. Library staff provide face-to-face assistance at the Level 7 Service desk and deliver a comprehensive information skills training program throughout the semester. The library allows access to casual day visitors (except during exam periods) and is also home to 300 general access computers for UTS students and staff.

== Library retrieval system ==
The Library Retrieval System (LRS) is an automated storage and retrieval system for the library's low use items. The LRS currently houses (as of December 2019) approximately 640,000 items, whilst 125,000 of the more recent and regularly accessed items of the library collection remain sitting physically on shelves. The system has capacity for around one million items.

UTS is the second university library in Australia to use this technology. UTS Library's LRS is located underground and the first to combine ASRS with Radio-frequency identification (RFID) taggingd. The LRS forms part of the university's City Campus Masterplan, which has seen a rollout of major new buildings and facilities.

It is envisaged in the City Campus Master Plan that the library will eventually be relocated to a new premises forming part of the UTS Central project on Broadway, at the heart of the university campus. The future library is planned to open to students in November 2019, relocating from Haymarket to building 2 on Broadway.

== Information literacy programs ==
The Library has adopted the Australian Information Literacy Standards as the basis for the information literacy framework and information skills programs at UTS.

== UTS ePRESS ==
UTS ePress is the digital, open access scholarly publishing arm of the university. The press publishes scholarly titles across a broad range of academic disciplines, including governance, history, law, literacy, international studies, society and social justice and indigenous studies. UTS ePress was established in 2004 to further open access to scholarly outputs, publishing peer-reviewed, scholarly literature in areas of strategic priority for UTS and beyond, attracting the involvement of scholars from around the world. The UTS eScholarship team are responsible for the management and publication of scholarly output through UTSePress. Published works are harvested by and searchable via Google Scholar. In addition, UTS eScholarship supports the data management of UTS and is home to the Australian Data Archive (ADA) NSW node and the national host of the Aboriginal and Torres Strait Islander Data Archive (ATSIDA).
