= Vicki Sara =

Australian endocrinologist

- Born: 17 September 1946 (age 79); Sydney, Australia
- Education: Ph.D, University of Sydney
- Awards: Officer of the Order of Australia
- Scientific career
- Fields: Endocrinology
- Thesis: The action of prenatal trophic hormones on brain growth and behaviour (1973)

Vicki Rubian Sara AO, FTSE, FAA (born 17 September 1946) is an Australian endocrinologist, who specialises in research into growth hormones and foetal brain development.

== Biography ==
Sara was born in Sydney, and attended Sydney Girls High School. She attended the University of Sydney, graduating with a Bachelor of Arts with Honours and a PhD in 1974 for her thesis titled "The action of prenatal trophic hormones on brain growth and behaviour". She worked at the Garvan Institute of Medical Research from 1973 to 1976, then as a research fellow at the International Brain Research Organization (IBRO). In 1980, she joined the Karolinska Institute in Stockholm, Sweden where she worked until 1993, when she returned to Australia to head the life sciences faculty at Queensland University of Technology. In 1996, she became dean of science at QUT.

Professor Sara's previous appointments include chief executive officer of the Australian Research Council (ARC) from 2001 to 2004 and chair of the council and a member of the Prime Minister's Science Engineering and Innovation Council (PMSEIC), and the CSIRO Board from 1997 to 2001.

Sara was appointed as the first female chair of ARC from 1997 to 2000.

On 15 December 2004, Sara was appointed as Chancellor of University of Technology Sydney, serving in the role until 17 February 2016. Following this, Sara vowed to continue her work advancing the cause and accepted the role of Patron of the UTS Creating Futures Bequest Society quoting "Together, we can ensure that UTS continues to educate global citizens for the many years to come and produce research with real impact." Sara's legacy gift to the UTS is providing scholarships to support opportunities for study at UTS.

In February 2015, the UTS Vicki Sara Building, also known as the Science Faculty Building, named in her honour was officially opened.

== Education ==
Educated University of Sydney (BA, PhD)

== Awards ==
- Centenary Medal in January 2001.
- Officer of the Order of Australia in 2010.
- Awarded the Rolf Luft medal in 1993 for excellence in endocrine research by the Karolinska Institute, Sara also received the Sir John Eccles Award from the NH&MRC in 1994.
- Awarded the Centenary Medal in 2003
- Awarded an Honorary Doctor of the University, Queensland University of Technology in 2006.
- Awarded an Honorary Doctor of Science by the University of Southern Queensland in 2004, the Victoria University in 2005, the University of Technology Sydney in 2009, and the University of Sydney in 2016

== Publications ==
Academic offices
Preceded by Sir Gerard Brennan	Chancellor of the University of Technology Sydney; 2004–2016	Succeeded by Brian Wilson
