= UTS Central =

Building in Sydney, Australia

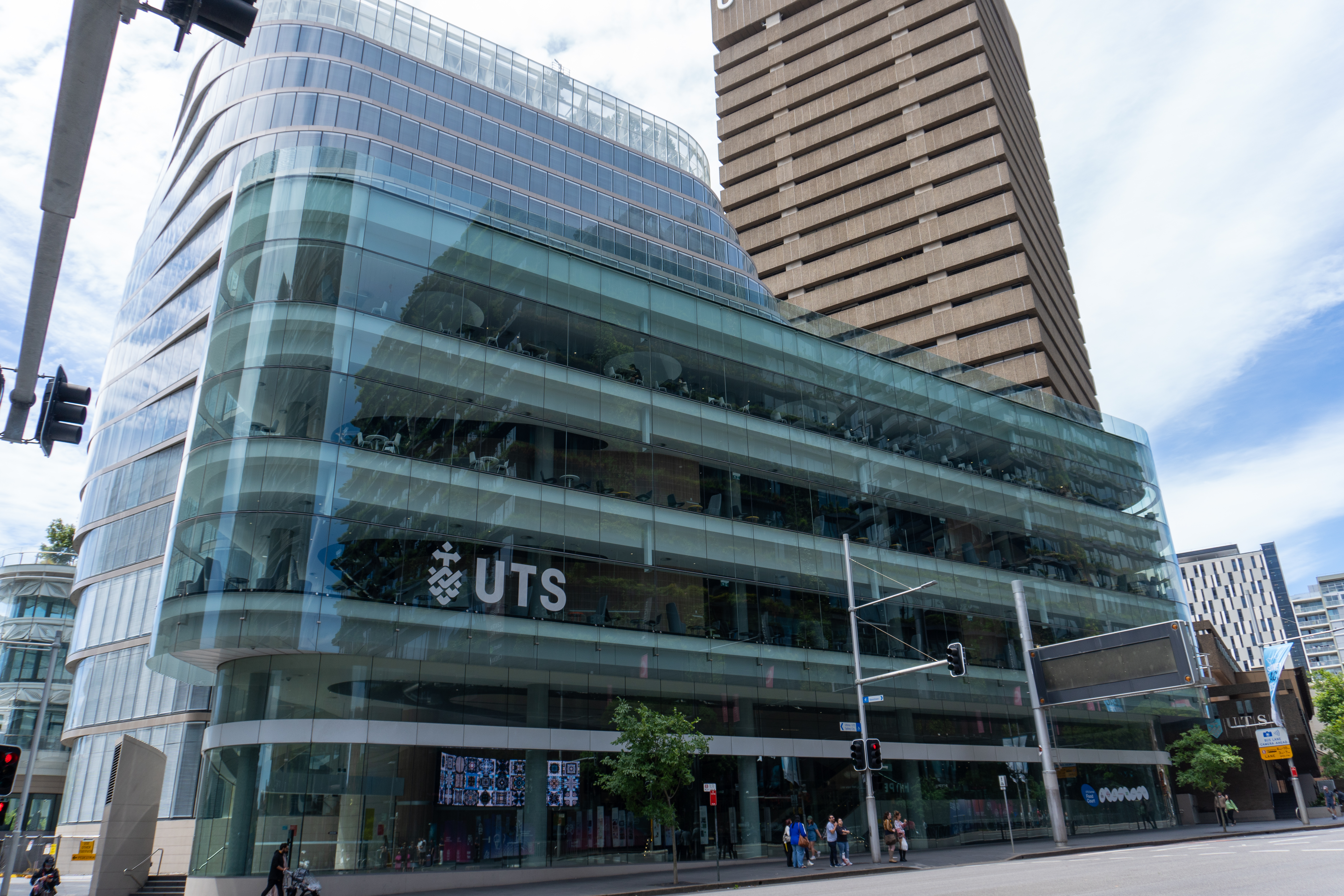
- UTS Central as viewed from Broadway
- Interactive map of the UTS Central area
- Alternative names: Building 2

General information
- Status: Completed
- Type: Public
- Architectural style: Neo-futurism
- Location: Ultimo, New South Wales, 61 Broadway, Ultimo 2007
- Coordinates: 33.88367°S 151.20013°E
- Construction started: Early 2017
- Opened: August 2019
- Cost: A$368.6 million
- Owner: University of Technology Sydney

Height
- Height: 66 metres (217 ft)

Technical details
- Floor count: 17
- Floor area: 32,400
- Lifts/elevators: 9

Design and construction
- Architecture firm: Francis-Jones Morehen Thorp
- Other designers: Lacoste+Stevenson, DJRD
- Main contractor: Richard Crookes Construction

UTS Central, also known as Building 2, is the building housing the Faculty of Law and UTS Library at the University of Technology Sydney. It is the final building to be opened under the A$1 billion City Campus Master Plan. The building is designed by Francis-Jones Morehen Thorp (FJMT), with elements of an original podium design by Lacoste+Stevenson in association with DJRD. Construction was overseen by head contractor Richard Crookes Constructions. The building is located next to the UTS Tower in Ultimo. It opened in August 2019.

== Design ==
The building is located next to the UTS tower and opposite Central Park in Broadway. The glass-encased UTS Central is made up of a dual design, with a 10-level twisted tower sitting above a 5-level podium and two underground floors. The UTS Central design is notable for its elegant, curved lines, which provide a complementary contrast to the modular, utilitarian design of the Brutalist UTS Tower. UTS Central is linked directly with the UTS Tower through pedestrian links on levels 3–6.

=== Double helix staircase ===
An intertwining double helix staircase made from Australian steel and curved glass connects levels 4 to 7. The double ribbon spiral design originated with architects FJMT and is inspired by the double helix structure of a DNA molecule, a reminder of how breakthroughs in science and technology have transformed our world. The double helix is one of four ‘architectural’ stairways in the building. All of the helical staircases in the UTS Central building, including the double helix, were designed in collaboration with a leading Australian stair designer and manufacturer.

=== Glass facade ===
The building's façade comprises around 3600 glass pieces made from 48 types of glass, the largest measuring 6 by 2.3 metres (19.7 by 7.5 ft) and weighing almost 700 kilograms (1,500 lb).

== Key features ==
=== UTS Library ===
The UTS Library relocated from Building 5 to UTS Central in November 2019. The relocation allows the UTS Library to be directly connected to the library retrieval system (LRS) located below the Alumni Green. Sitting above the reading room, the library spans over three levels granting views out over Alumni Green; Level 8 offers access to two outdoor terraces and Level 9 is for silent studies. It also has two public exhibition areas, one outside and one inside.

=== UTS Reading Room ===
The design of the UTS Reading Room was inspired by traditional scholarly spaces, with a triple-height atrium opening to a large skylight and an uninterrupted glass façade overlooking Alumni Green.

=== Hive Superlab ===
Located below ground on level 1, the Hive Superlab can accommodate up to 270 students and contains specialist audio-visual facilities (including bone conduction headphones) that allow seven classes to run simultaneously.

=== Classrooms ===
The two largest classrooms hold up to 350 students, while a third accommodates 198 students.

=== Faculty of Law ===
The upper levels of UTS Central will be home to the Faculty of Law. It will accommodate offices for the Law faculty, student areas and centres including AntiSlavery Australia and the UTS-UNSW Australasian Legal Information Institute. A moot court and two trial courts with modern technologies found in Australian courts will be available for law students.

=== Public food court ===
A large food court is located on level 3 with 440 seats and eight food outlets.

== Sustainability ==
The building is targeting a 5 star Green Star rating from the Green Building Council of Australia. UTS Central has been developed with many sustainability features including;

- Intelligent sensors connected to the building management system adjust heating, cooling and ventilation based on the amount of occupants in the building
- Recycled water used for toilet flushing and irrigation of the building's landscaping
- Adjustable louvre blinds which are connected to the building management system control the amount of sunlight hitting the glass facade
- Chilled water supplied from the nearby Central Park provides cooling for the air-conditioning at UTS Central and other buildings

== Gallery ==
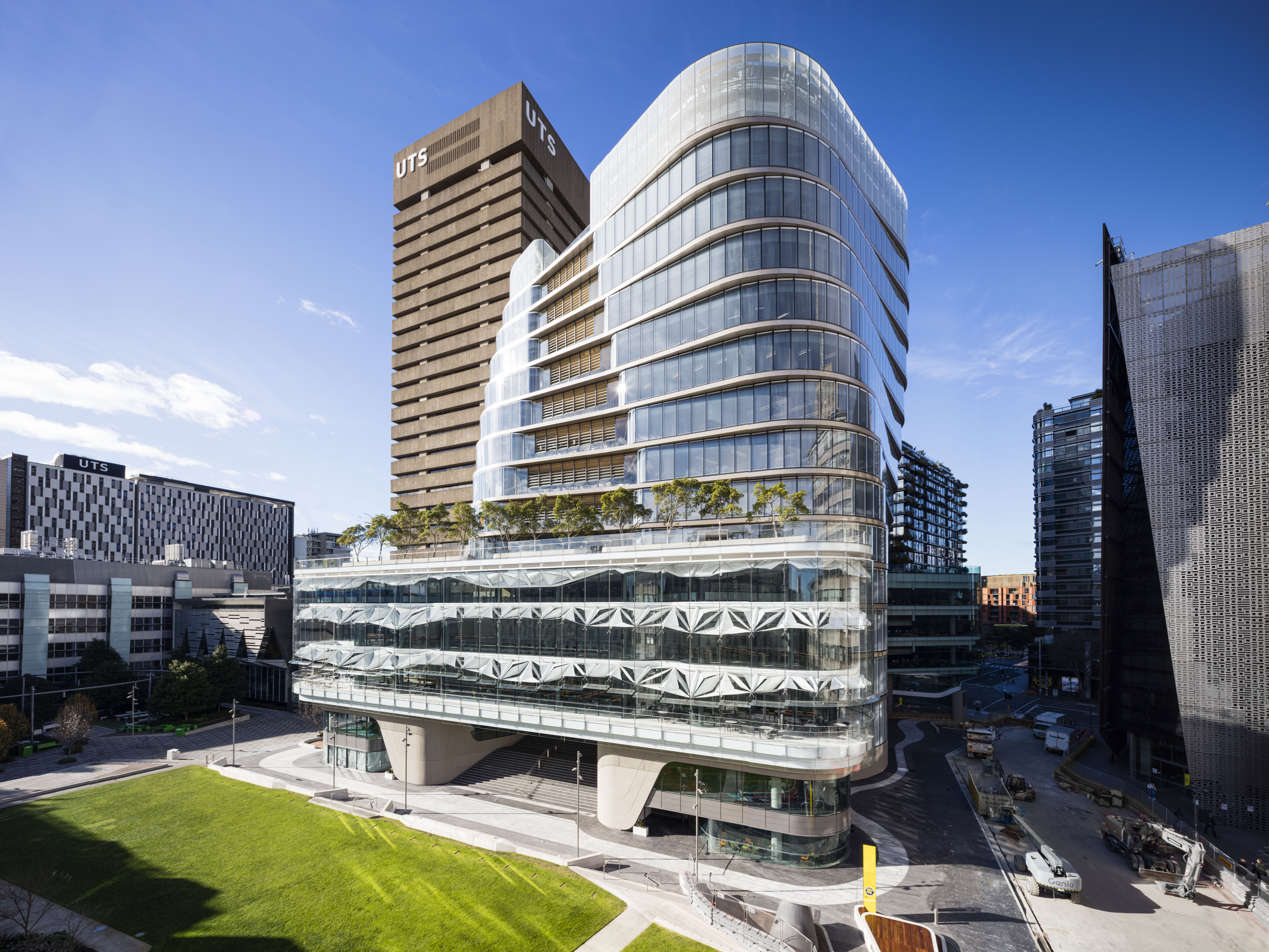
UTS Central as viewed from Alumni Green

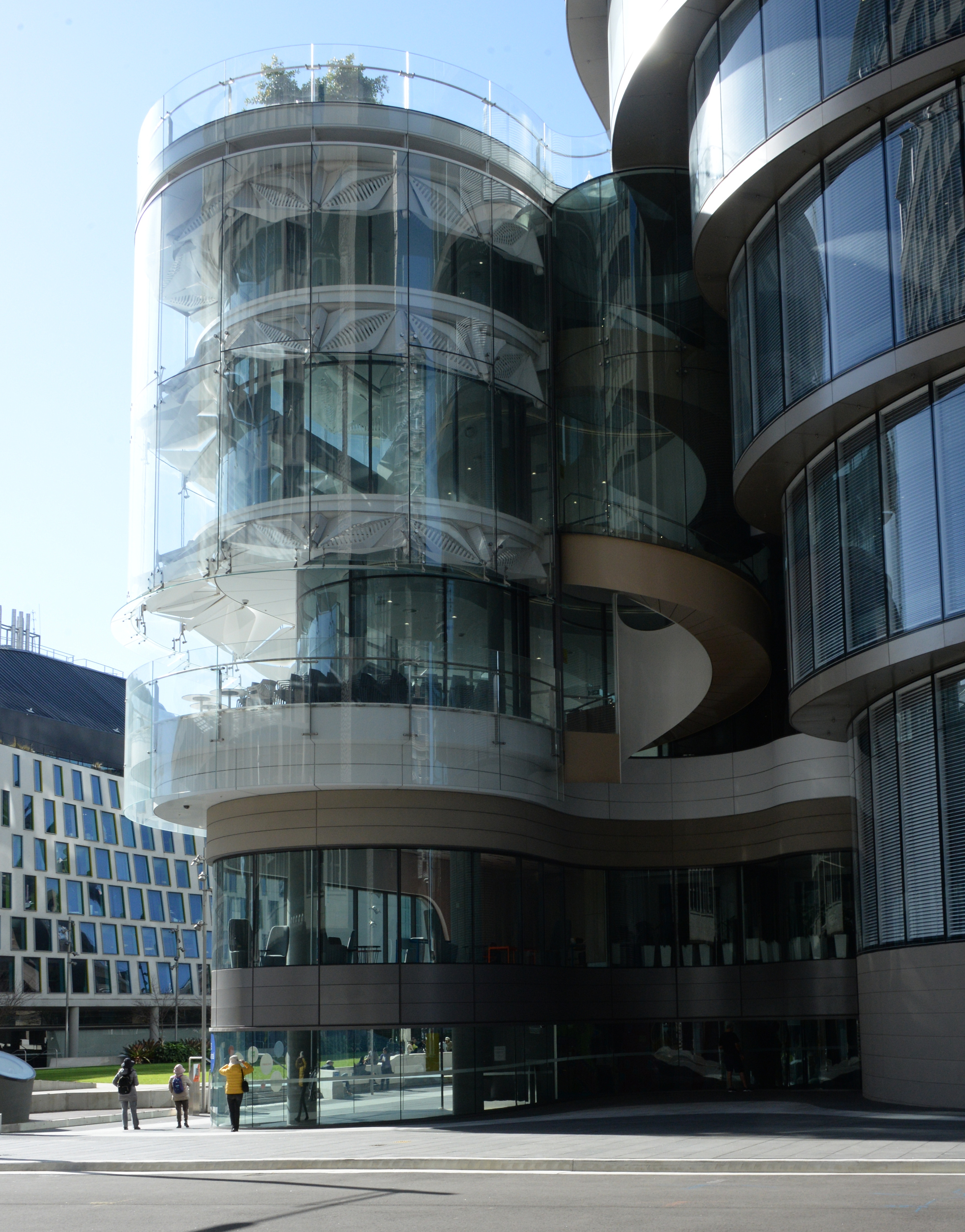
UTS Central as viewed from Jones Street

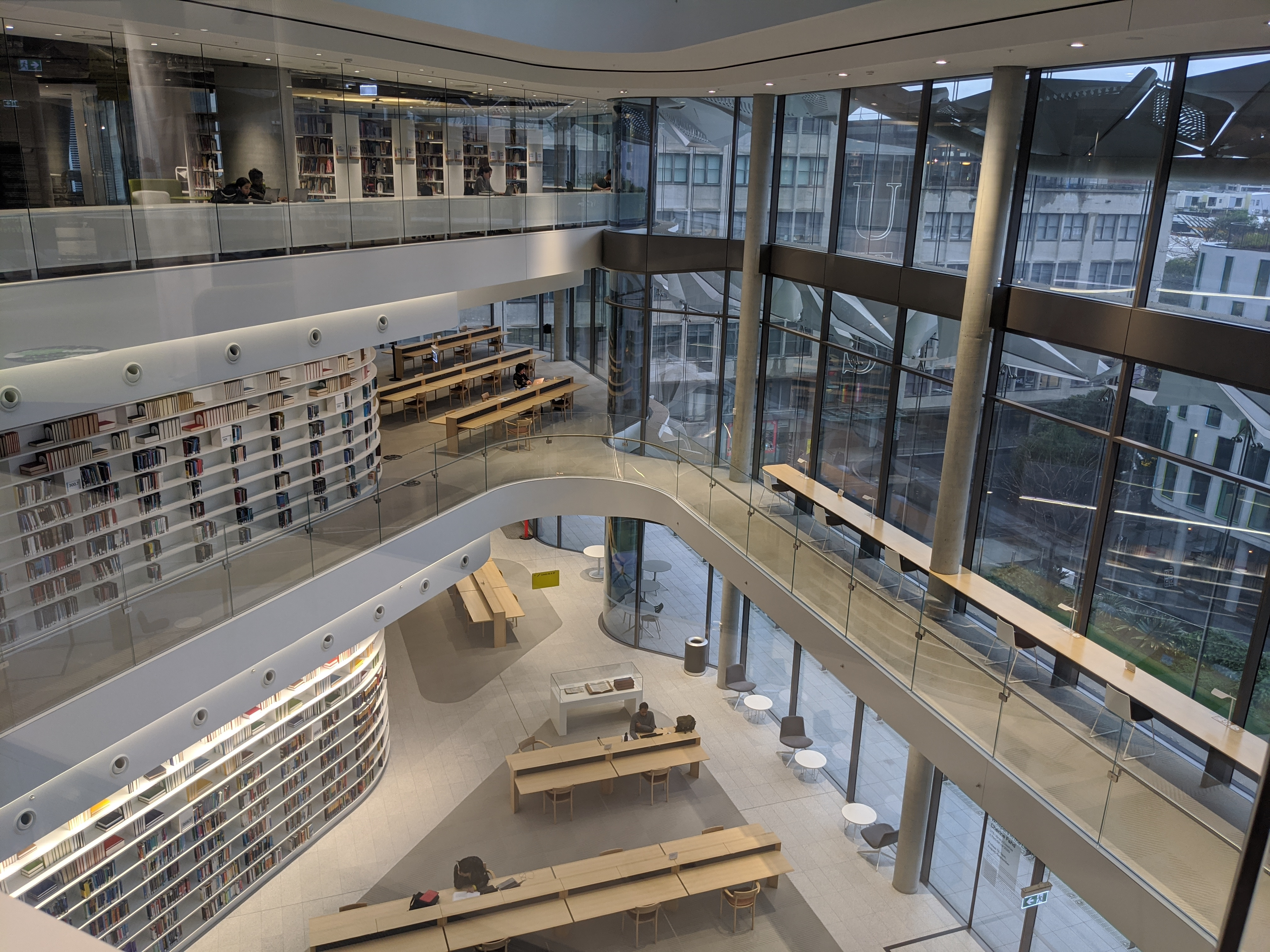
Interior view of UTS Library and Reading Room

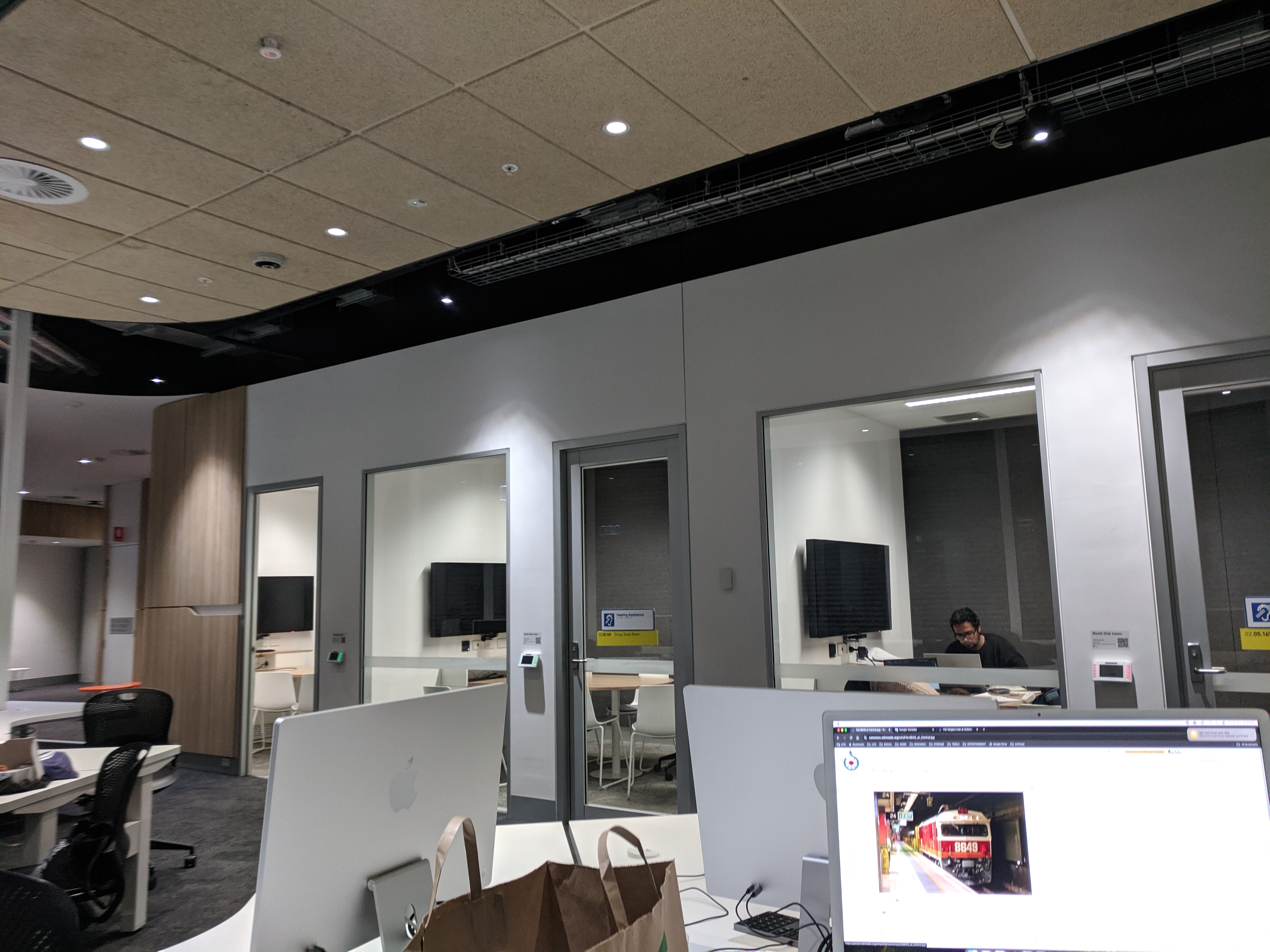
Study rooms located throughout levels 4 to 9.

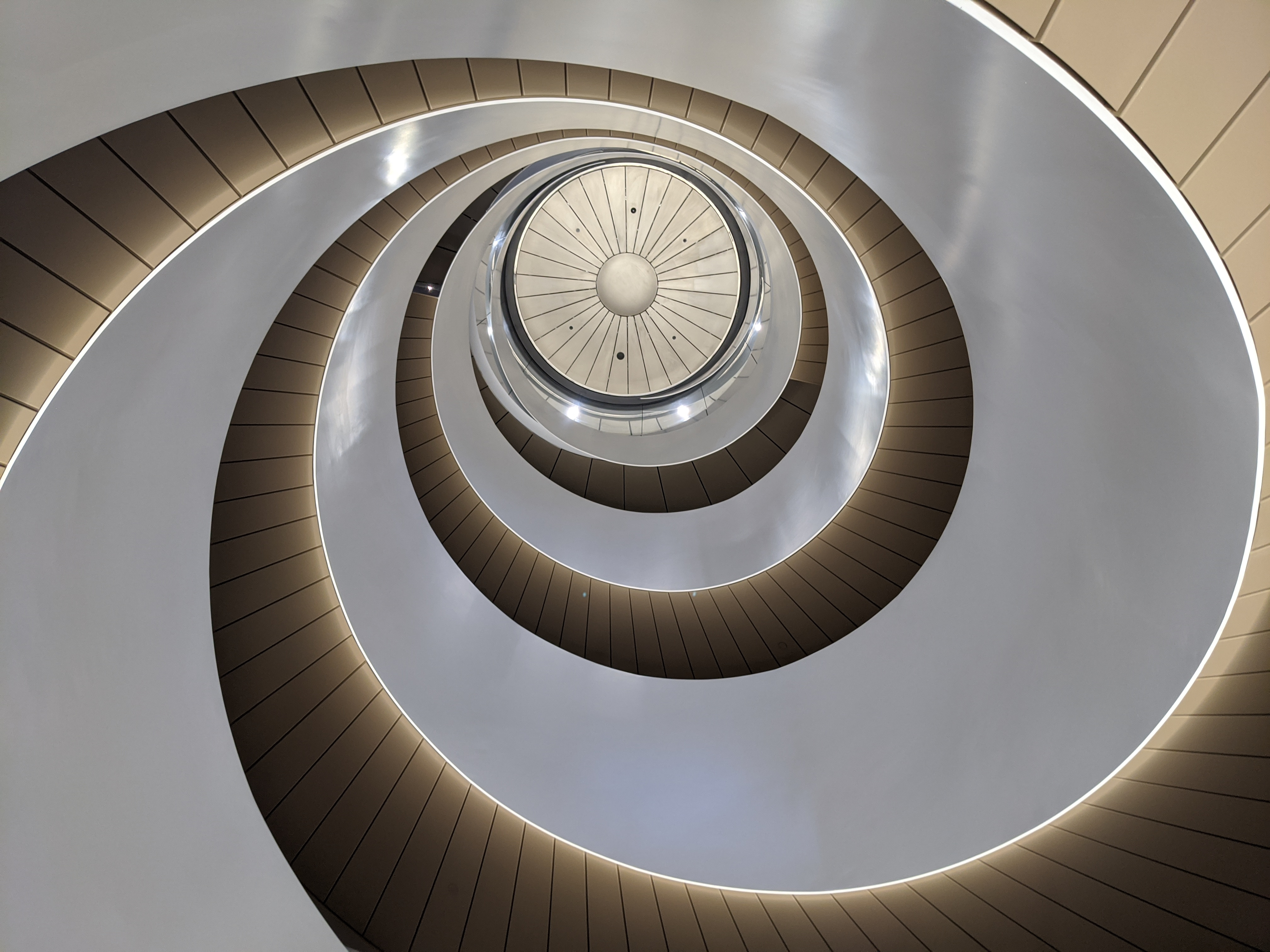
The double helix staircase in UTS Central

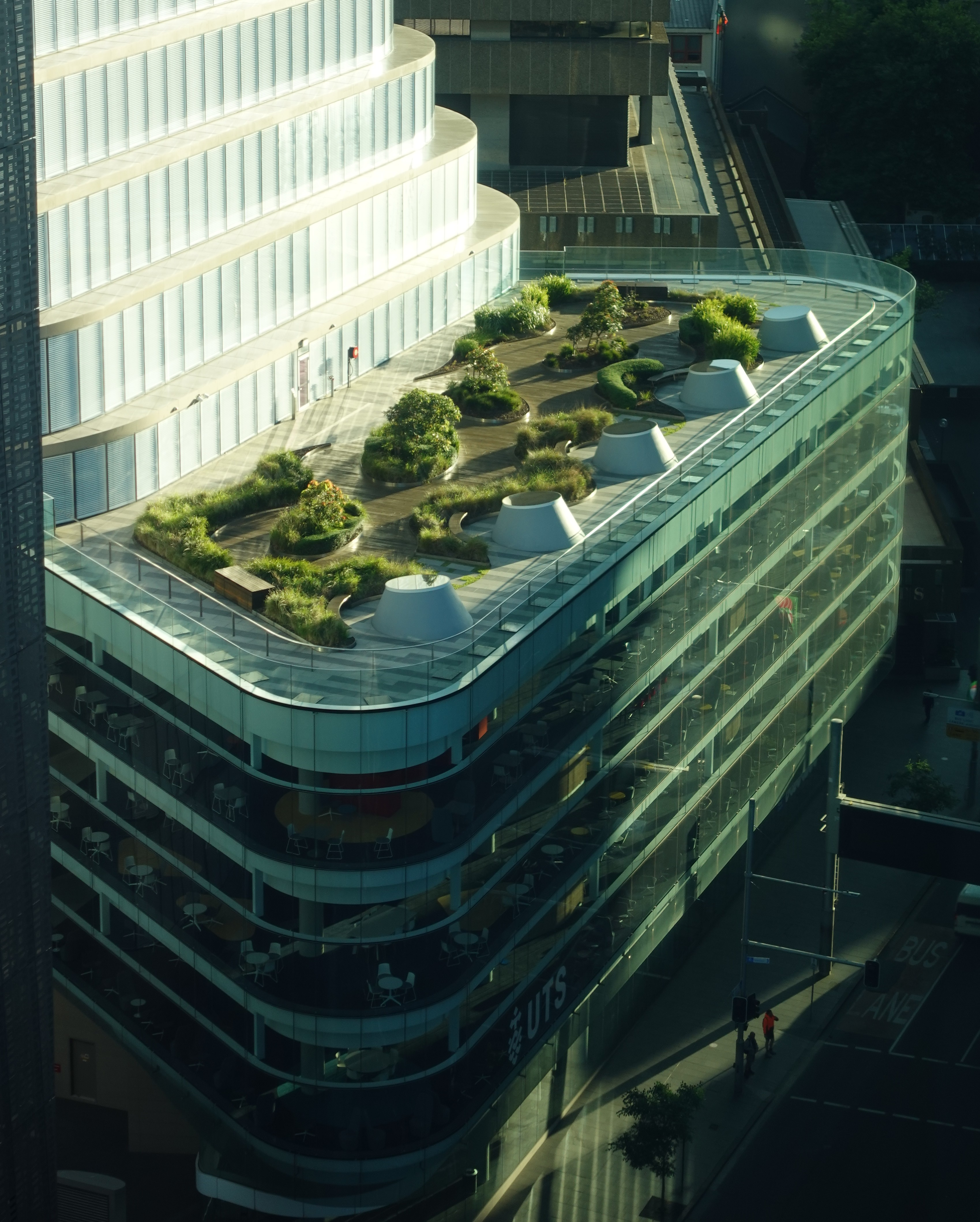
Aerial view of the rooftop garden

== See also ==
- Buildings and architecture of Sydney
- University of Technology Sydney
