= University of Technology Sydney =

Public research university in Australia

- Former names: New South Wales Institute of Technology (1964–1988)
- Motto: Think. Change. Do.
- Type: Public research university
- Established: 26 January 1988; 38 years ago
- Accreditation: TEQSA
- Academic affiliations: ATN; WUN; UA
- Budget: A$1.39 billion (2024)
- Visitor: Governor of New South Wales (ex officio)
- Chancellor: Michael Rose
- Vice-Chancellor: Andrew Parfitt
- Academic staff: 2,014 (2024)
- Administrative staff: 2,249 (2024)
- Total staff: 4,264 (2024)
- Students: 51,038 (2024)
- Undergraduates: 35,453 (2024)
- Postgraduates: 15,585 (2024)
- Location: Sydney, New South Wales, Australia; 33.883611°S 151.200833°E
- Campus: Urban
- Colours: Black, white, blue and red
- Sporting affiliations: UniSport; EAEN
- Mascot: Lenny the Lizard
- Website: uts.edu.au

The University of Technology Sydney (UTS) is a public research university located in Sydney, New South Wales, Australia. The university was founded in its current form in 1988, though its origins as a technical institution can be traced back to the 1870s. UTS is a founding member of the Australian Technology Network (ATN), and is a member of Universities Australia (UA) and the Worldwide Universities Network (WUN).

The university is organised into nine faculties and schools, which together administers 130 undergraduate courses and 210 postgraduate courses. In 2024, the university enrolled 51,038 students, including 35,453 undergraduate students. The university is home to over 45 research centres and institutes, who regularly collaborates along with industry and government partners.

UTS recognises more than 180 different clubs and societies. Its varsity sports teams, which is overseen by UTS Sport, competes in the UniSport Nationals as well as in standalone national championships throughout the year. As of 2024, the university has over 280,000 alumni worldwide.

== History ==
The Sydney Mechanics' School of Arts (the oldest continuously running Mechanics' Institute in Australia) was established in 1833. In the 1870s, the school expanded into technical education and formed the Working Men's College, which was taken over by the NSW government to form the Sydney Technical College in 1878.

In 1940 the NSW Parliament passed an Act to establish an Institute of Technology, which in 1964 led to the establishment of the New South Wales Institute of Technology (NSWIT). In 1968, the NSWIT amalgamated with the NSW Institute of Business Studies. In 1976 NSWIT established the first law school in NSW outside the university sector. The Haymarket campus officially opened in 1985.

On 8 October 1987 university status was granted to NSWIT, which was followed by the passing of the University of Technology, Sydney, Act 1987. It was reconstituted as the University of Technology Sydney (UTS) on 26 January 1988, along with the incorporation of the School of Design of the former Sydney College of the Arts. In 1989, the University of Technology, Sydney, Act 1989 (NSW) formed UTS by absorbing the Kuring-gai College of Advanced Education (KCAE) and the Institute of Technical and Adult Teacher Education (ITATE) of the Sydney College of Advanced Education. By 1991, an academic structure of nine faculties and 25 schools was established.

The School of Design was initially housed at a campus in Balmain, which closed at the end of 1994, with the school moved to a new building at the city campus. The environmental, biological and biomedical science schools were located on a campus at St Leonards, which was closed in 2006, which also relocated to the city campus following a redevelopment.

The Kuring-Gai campus closed at the end of 2015, with classes and facilities moved into the main Haymarket campus. This marked the consolidation of UTS into a single unified campus in the Sydney CBD.

Following an academic restructure in 2025, the Faculty of Design, Architecture and Building was merged alongside the former Faculty of Arts and Social Sciences (FASS) and the UTS Animal Logic Academy to form the Faculty of Design and Society.

== Campus ==
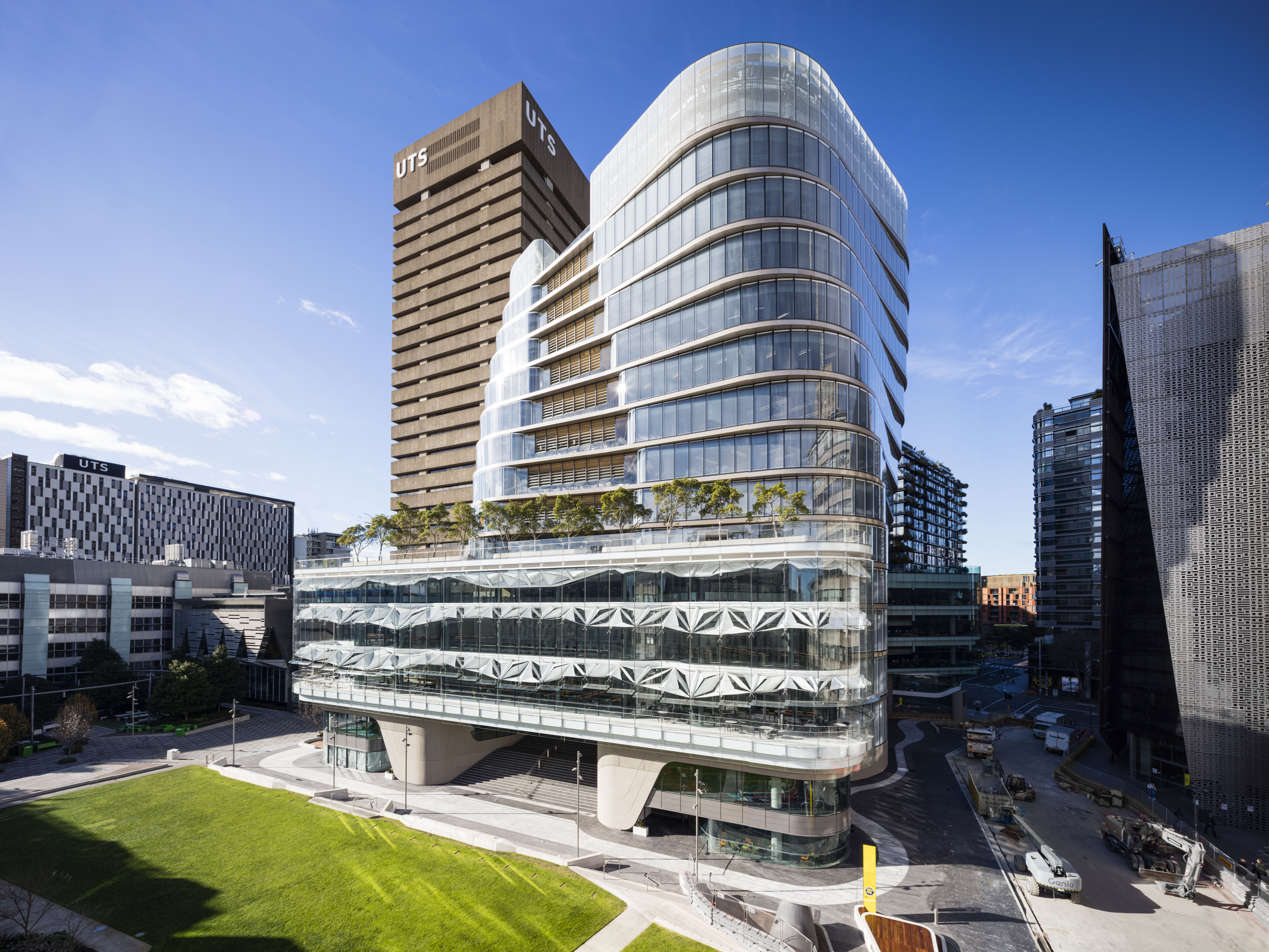
UTS City Campus

The UTS city campus is located at the southern border of the Sydney central business district, close to Central station and Railway Square, within Sydney's emerging Tech Central. The UTS Tower is the nucleus of the city campus, fronting on to Broadway.

The campus consists of five distinct precincts. Broadway, Haymarket and Blackfriars are located at the city campus, while precincts at Moore Park and Botany integrate specialist facilities with surrounding industry organisations. Broadway (located in Ultimo) is home to the faculties of Science, Health, Law, Arts and Social Sciences, Engineering and IT, and Design, Architecture and Building, as well as the UTS Library. Haymarket is the location of the Business School, UTS Startups, the UTS Animal Logic Academy and two lecture theatres in the Powerhouse Museum. The Blackfriars precinct in Chippendale contains the Blackfriars Children's Centre and research and innovation teams while the Moore Park precinct features sports facilities within the Rugby Australia Building and the Botany precinct consists of the specialist research facility UTS Tech Lab.

The campus has been substantially transformed since 2008 by the university's City Campus Master Plan, a $1 billion-plus investment in new buildings and facilities, major upgrades and refurbishments.

=== Buildings and architecture ===
The UTS Tower on Broadway (Building 1) is an example of brutalist architecture with square and block concrete designs. Completed and officially opened in 1979 by Premier Neville Wran, the Tower initially housed the NSW Institute of Technology, which transformed to become UTS in the late 1980s. In October 2006, the UTS Tower was voted the ugliest building in Sydney in a poll hosted by the Sydney Morning Herald, receiving 23% of the total vote. The Tower is the largest campus building in terms of both height and floor space.

Other notable buildings in the Broadway precinct include:

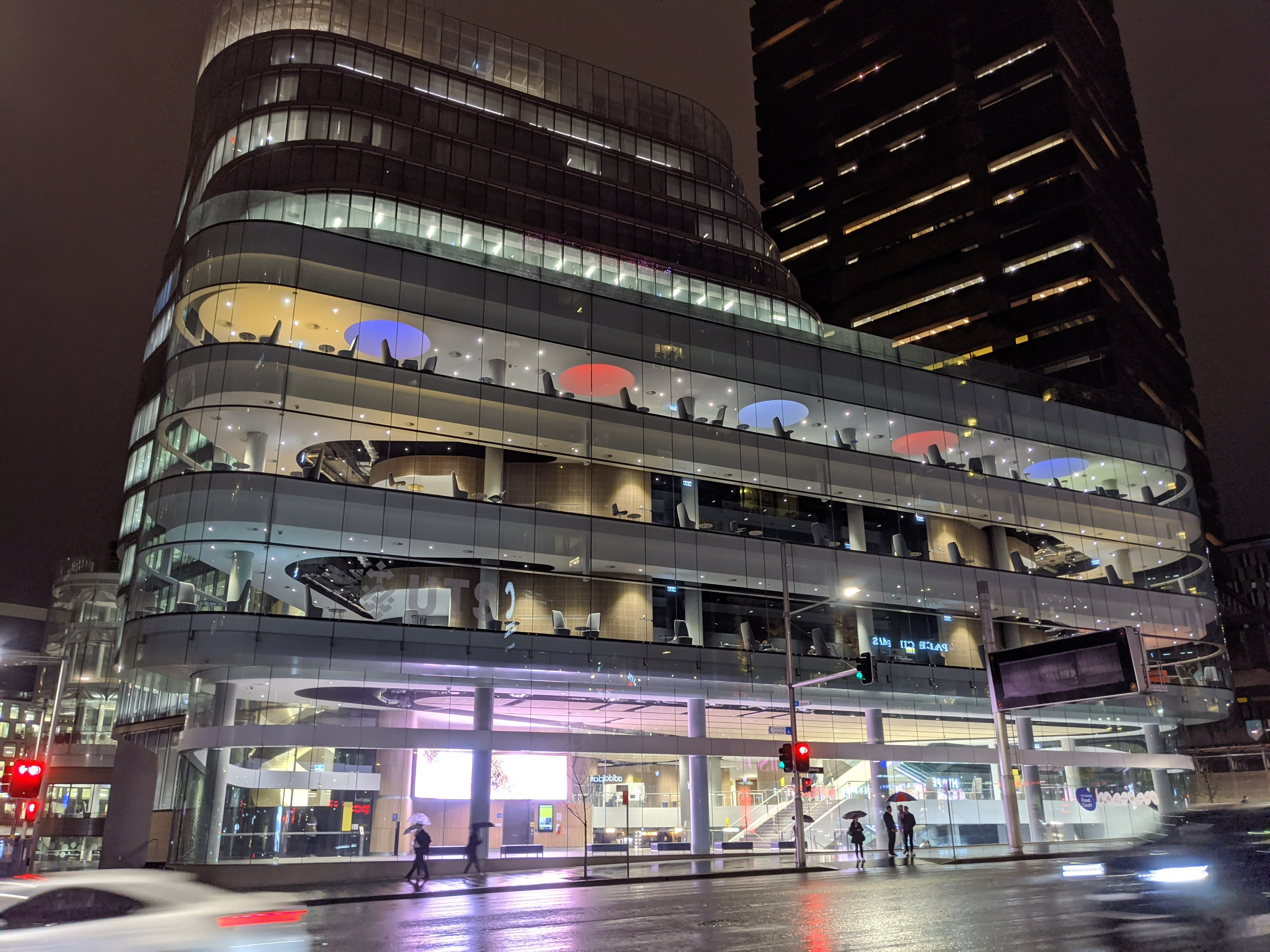
UTS Central as viewed from Broadway at night

- Building 2, UTS Central, is intended as a central hub for the campus. Opened in August 2019, the 17-storey building is encased in glass and includes the UTS Library, the Faculty of Law, the Hive Super Lab, three large collaborative classrooms, student spaces and a food court. The new food court includes outlets such as Mad Mex, Chatime, PapaRich and Uni Bros, and all single-use plastic packaging has been replaced with fully compostable, reusable or recyclable alternatives. It was designed by Australian architectural firm Francis-Jones Morehan Thorp.
- Building 3, the Bon Marche Building, which dates to the 1890s and was named after the Parisian department store Le Bon Marché. Originally a department store operated by Marcus Clark & Co, the building was incorporated into the university campus in 2000 and now accommodates recording studios and other specialist facilities for the Faculty of Arts and Social Sciences.
- Building 7, or the Vicki Sara Building, home to Faculty of Science administration and specialist facilities such as the SuperLab, Crime Scene Simulation Spaces, and the original home of the Graduate School of Health (which moved to Building 20 at 100 Broadway in 2020). Designed by architects Durbach Block Jaggers, in association with BVN Architecture, it has been awarded a 6 Star Green Star Design and As-Built rating, certified by the Green Building Council of Australia, and includes many sustainable features including a rooftop garden with stormwater collection and recycled building materials.
- Building 10 on Jones St colloquially known as 'the Fairfax Building' as it originally accommodated the printing facilities for the Fairfax Media owned Sydney Morning Herald. It was later home to the Sydney Organising Committee for the Olympic Games (SOCOG), before being incorporated within the UTS campus in the early 2000s. It accommodates the Faculty of Arts and Social Sciences and the Faculty of Health. The refurbished building received the 2003 Sir John Sulman Award for Public Architecture.

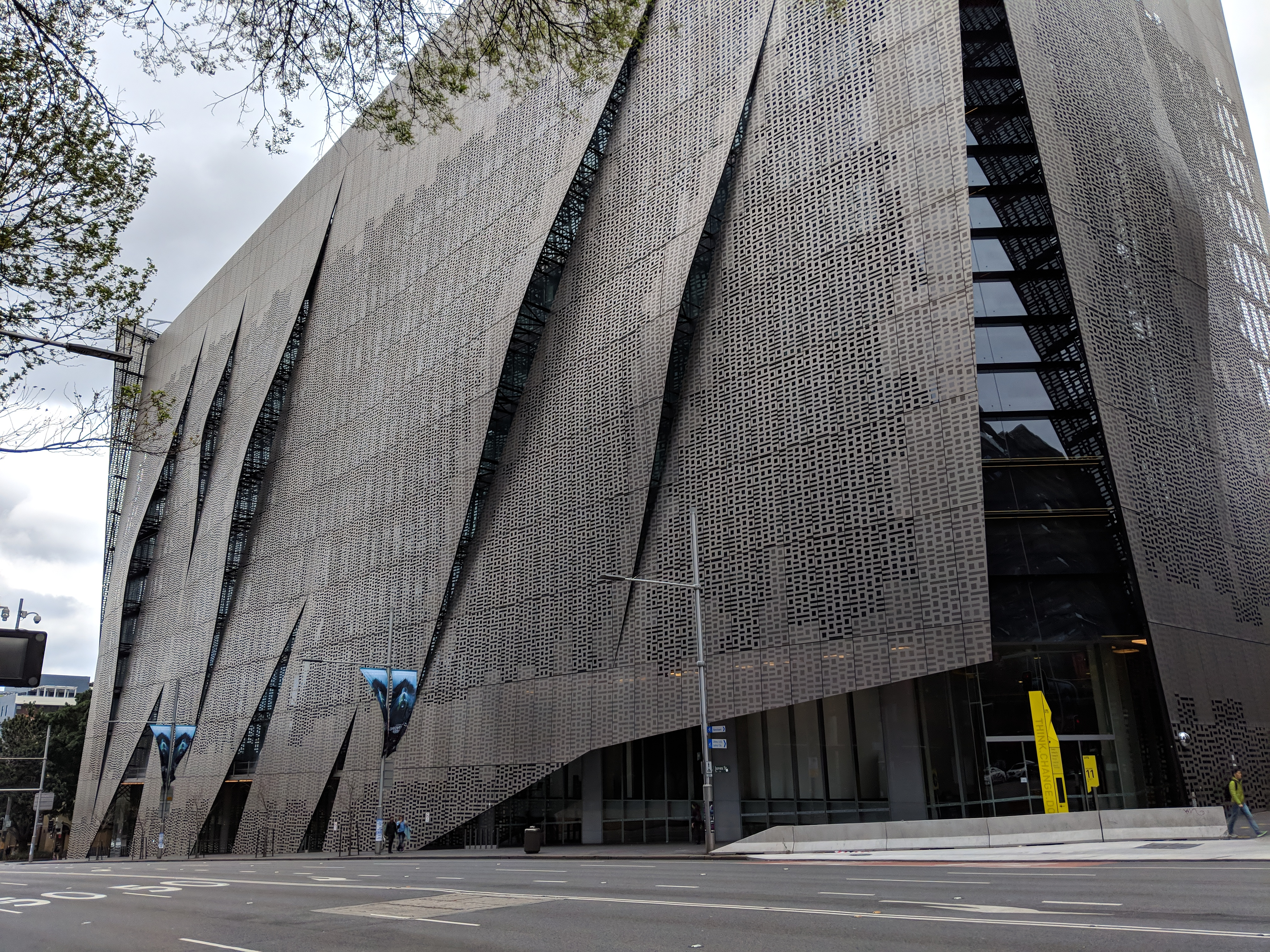
Faculty of Engineering and IT Building

- Building 11, which opened in 2014 and accommodates the Faculty of Engineering and IT, along with many of its specialist facilities. Designed by architects Denton Corker Marshall, the building is encased in aluminium screens perforated with binary code that spells out the name of the faculty. 'Gills' creased into the aluminium plates light up green at night and symbolically represent the building as a living, breathing structure.
- Alumni Green, the central green space on campus, encircled by prominent campus buildings including the Tower. Designed by landscape architects ASPECT Studios, Alumni Green consists of three distinct zones: a garden area with outdoor seating; a paved open space modelled on celebrated town squares; and a 1200m^{2} raised grass platform, which creates a green roof for a 13,000m^{2} underground Library Retrieval System.

The Haymarket precinct includes buildings such as:

- Building 5, former market buildings with a heritage façade and modern interior, designed by architect Phillip Cox. The building accommodates administrative, teaching and learning space for the UTS College.
- Building 8, the Dr Chau Chak Wing Building, is the first Australian building designed by celebrated architect Frank Gehry and is considered a contemporary architectural icon. The building accommodates teaching, learning, research and office space for the UTS Business School. Design features include a prominent polished stainless steel staircase that acts as a sculptural focal point in the main lobby, undulating brickwork with approximately 320,000 individual bricks referencing Sydney sandstone laid by hand and two oval classrooms constructed of large laminated timber beams.

Additionally in the Moore Park precinct, the Rugby Australia Building contains specialist facilities for UTS students, staff and researchers working across sport and exercise science, physiotherapy and sport media. Designed by architects Populous, the building is also the headquarters of Rugby Australia and home to Australia's national rugby teams. The external fixed aluminium shading controls solar penetration, while internal spaces include the purpose-built laboratories of the Human Performance Research Centre.

A number of UTS campus buildings have received a certified Green Star rating from the Green Building Council of Australia. The Vicki Sara Building has been awarded a 6 Star Green Star Design and As-Built Rating, while the Faculty of Engineering and IT and Dr Chau Chak Wing Buildings has been awarded 5 stars.

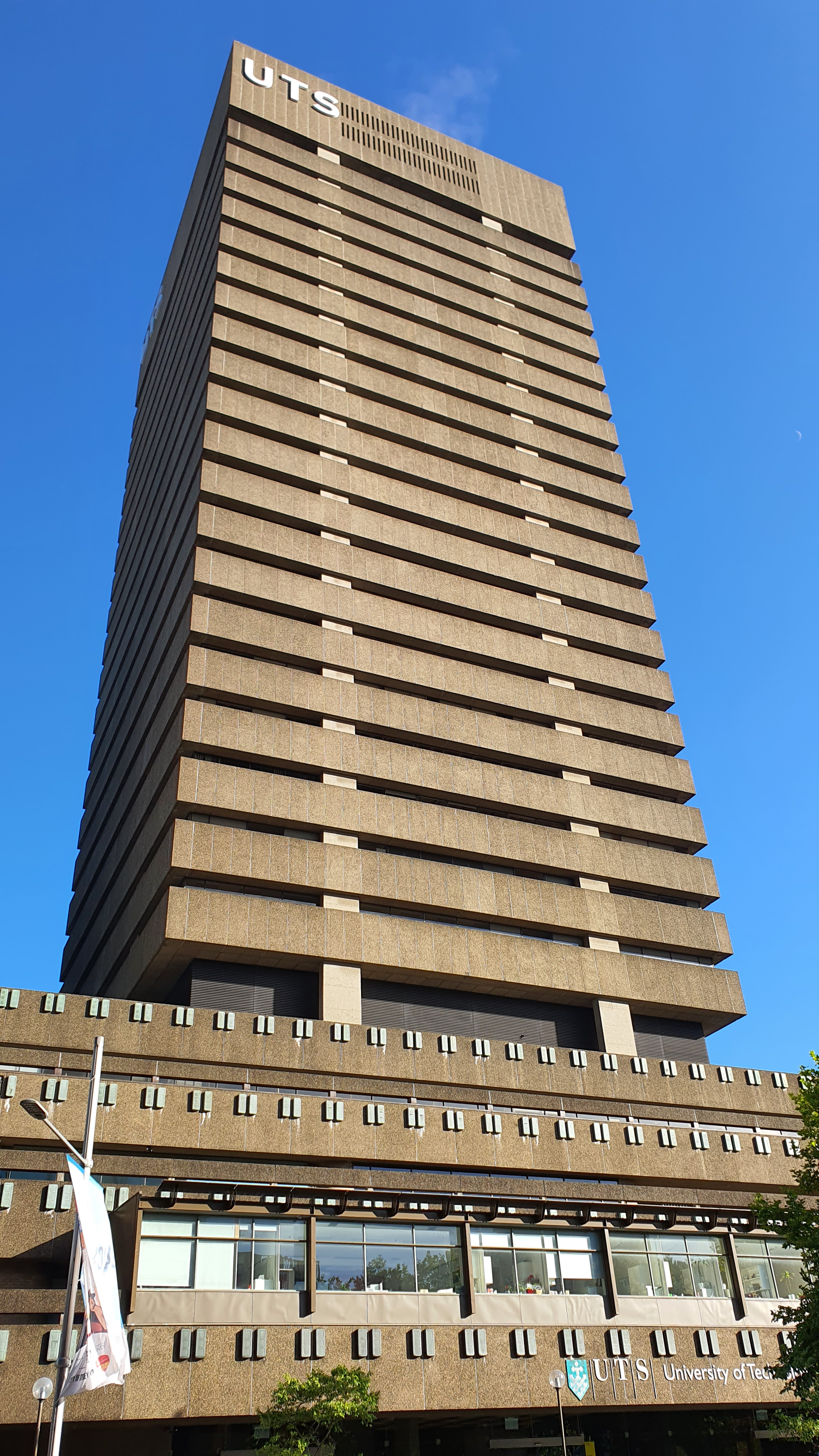
UTS Tower

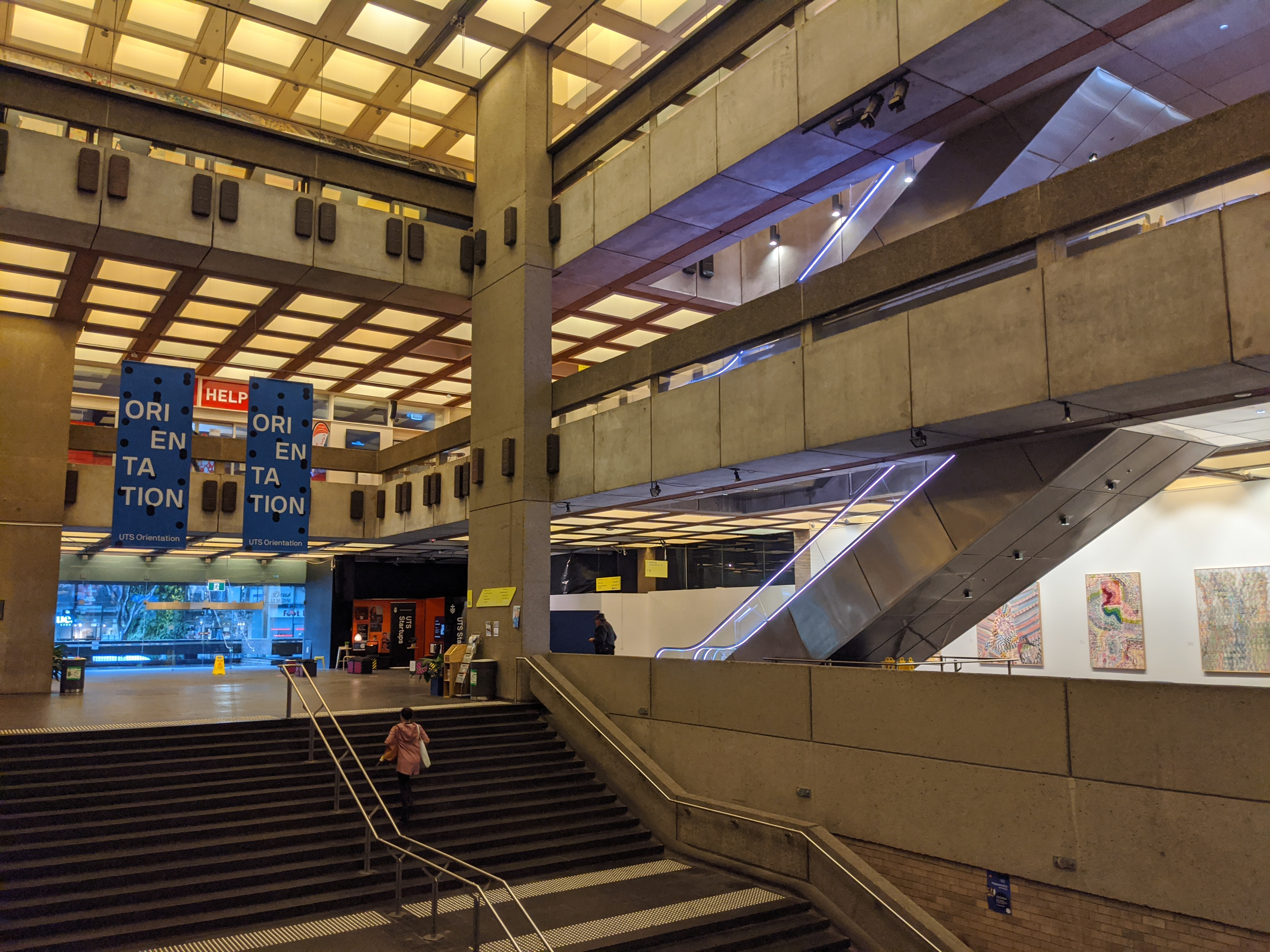
Internal atrium of the UTS Tower

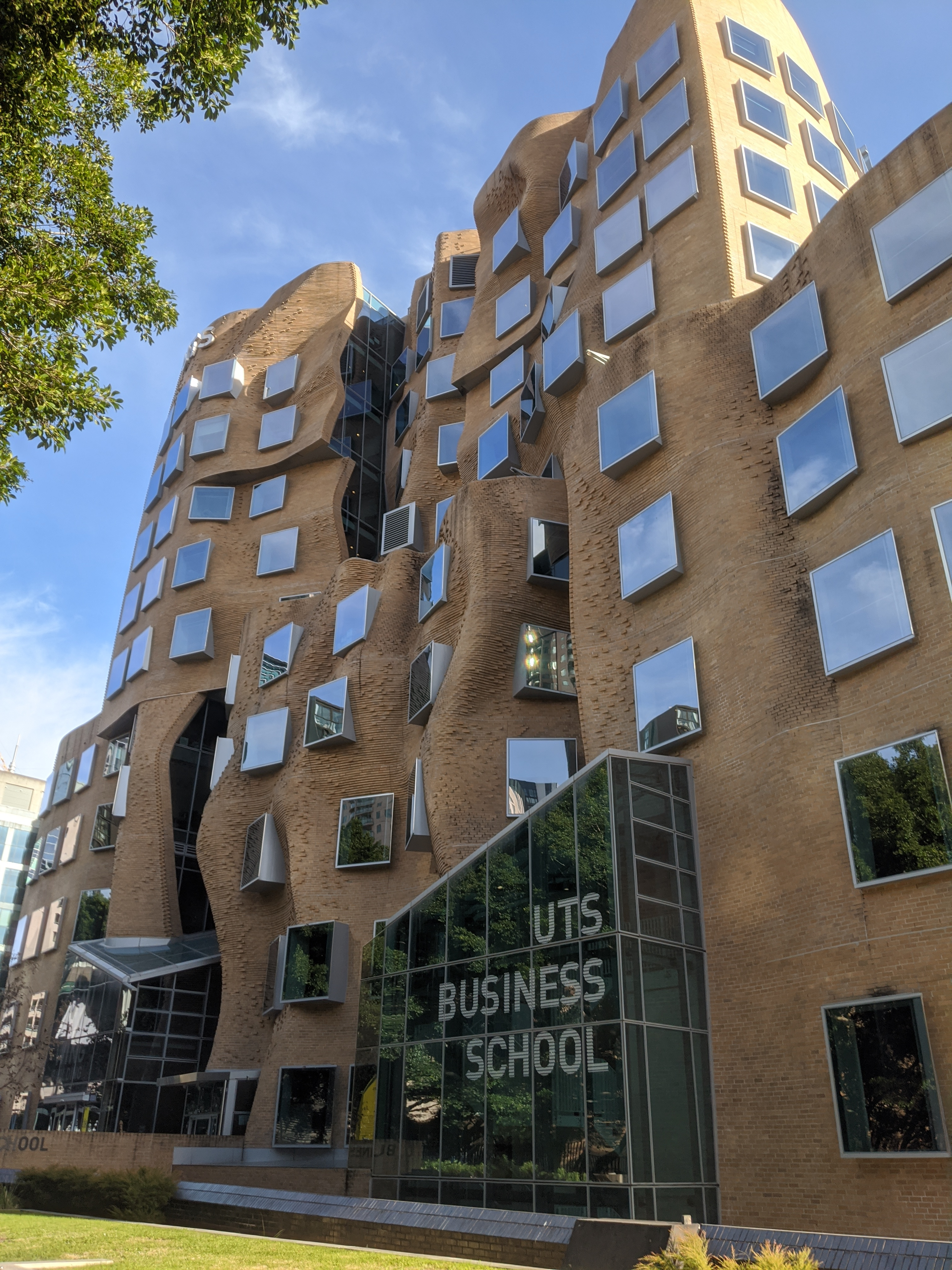
Dr Chau Chak Wing Building was designed by Canadian architect Frank Gehry

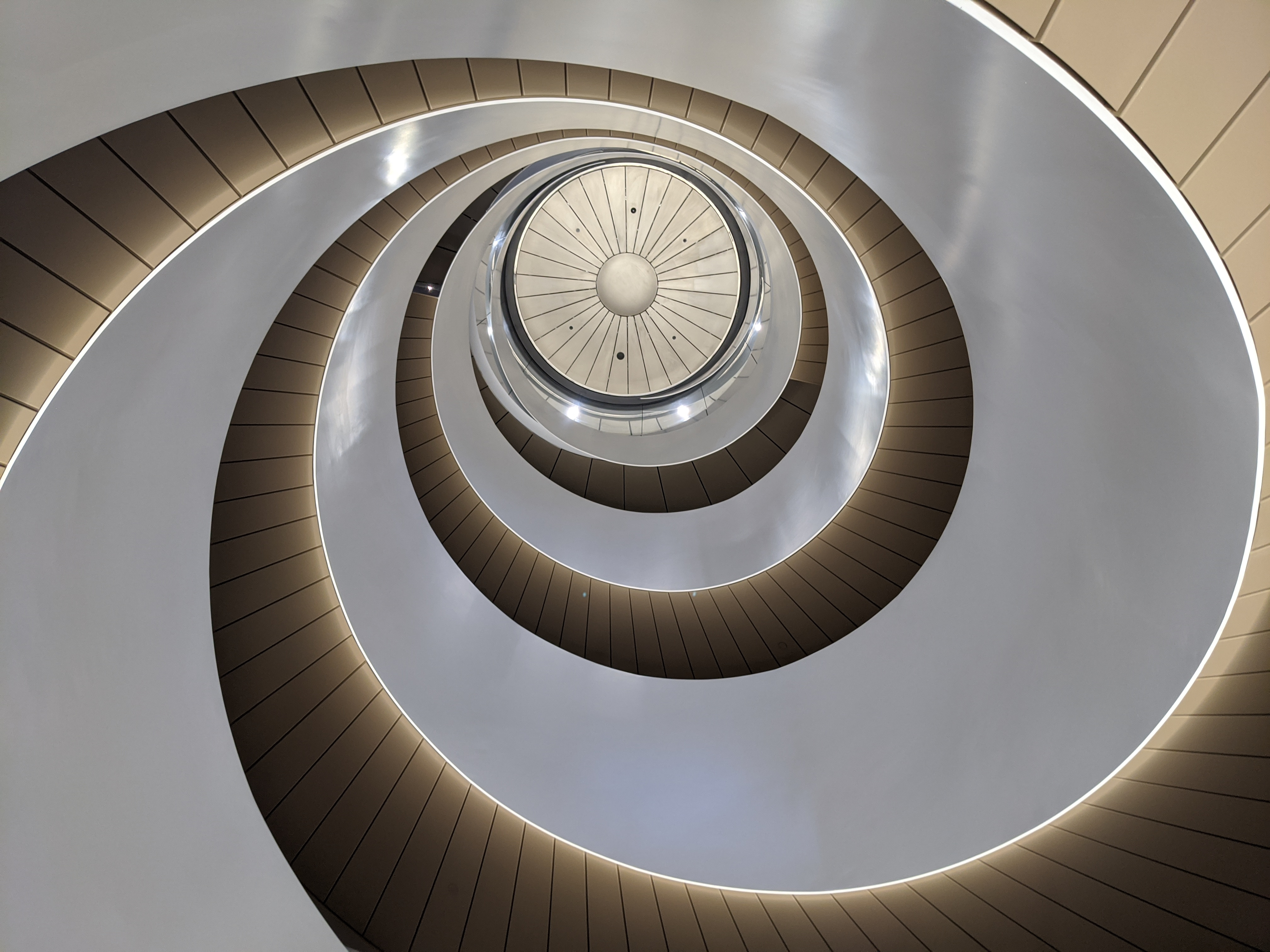
The double helix staircase inside UTS Central

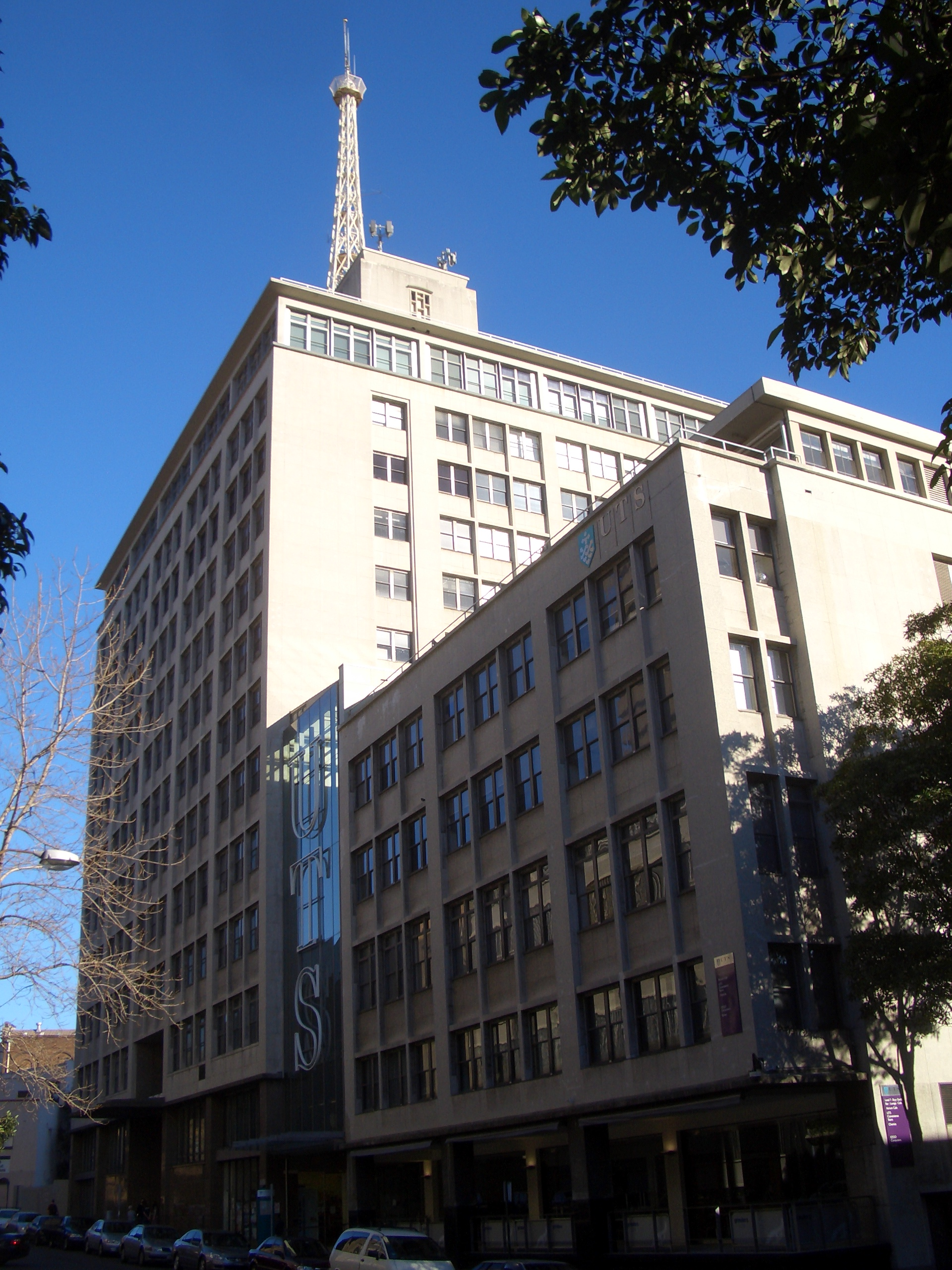
Building 10 was the headquarters of Fairfax

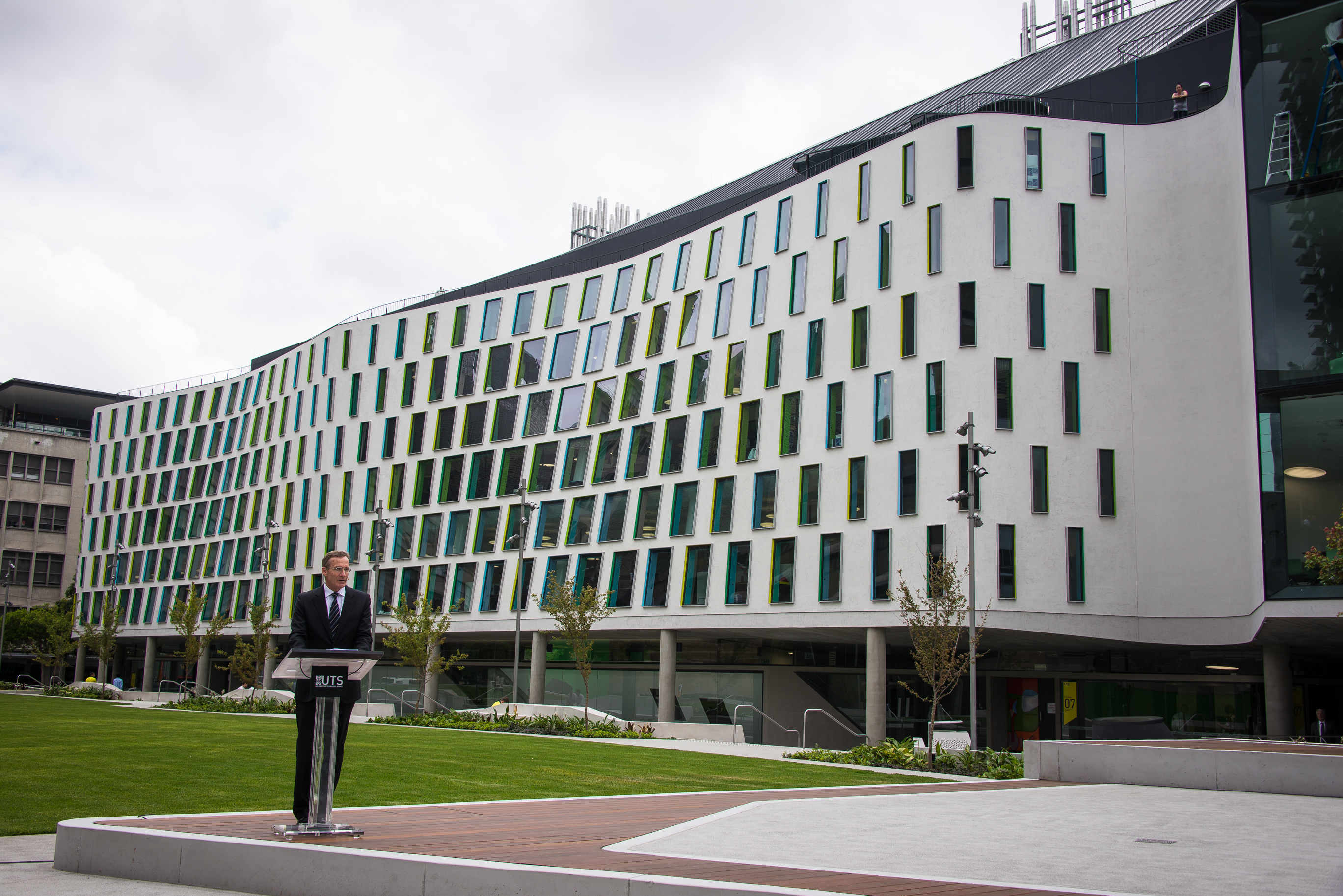
UTS Vicki Sara Building as viewed from Alumni Green

=== Library and galleries ===
==== UTS Library ====
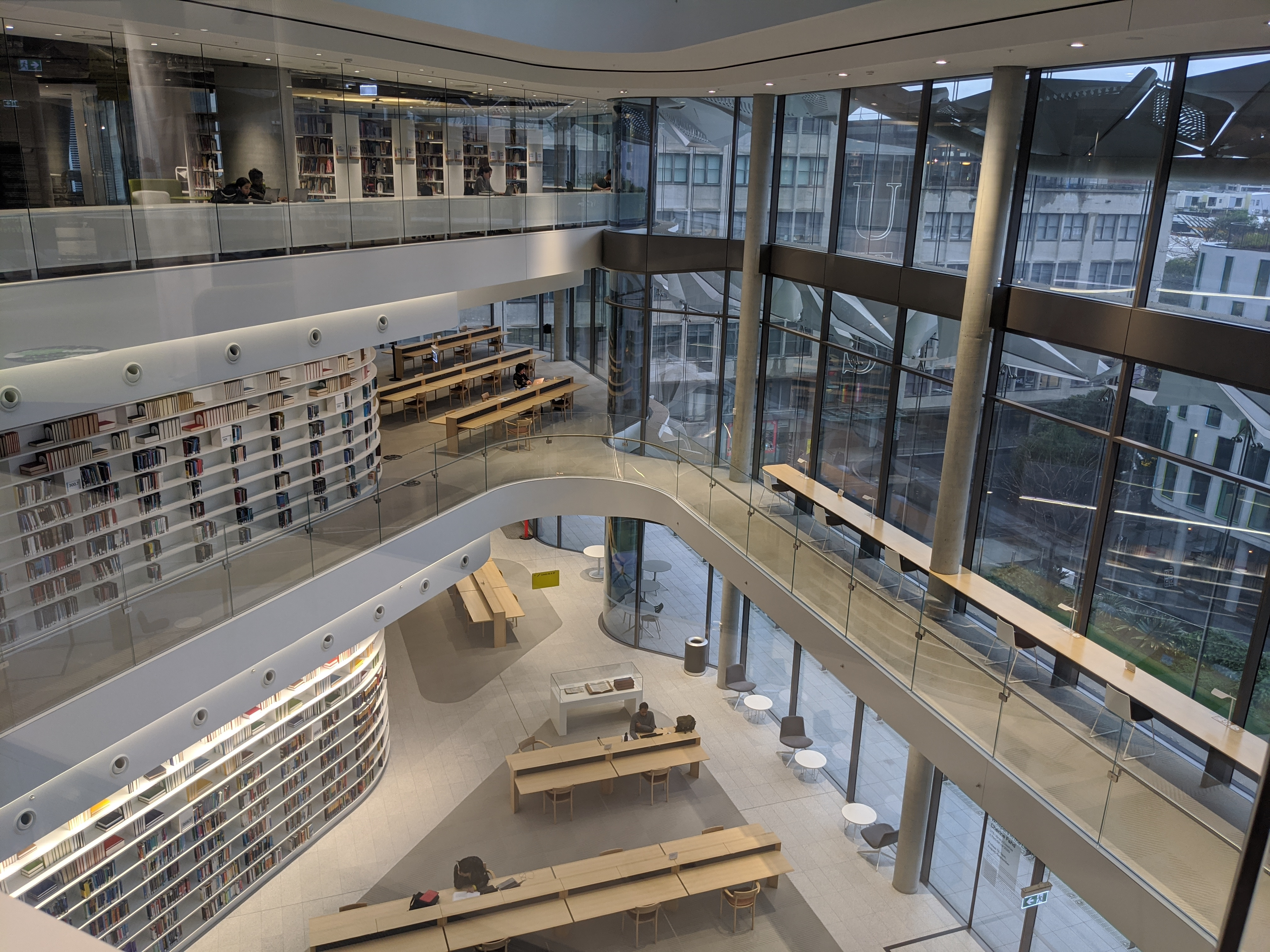
Interior view of the UTS Library and Reading Room

UTS provides library services through the UTS Library and Reading Room in Building 2 (UTS Central), as well as a range of online services on the UTS Library website.

==== UTS Art Collection ====
The UTS Gallery and Art Collection contains over 850 works, with a focus on contemporary Australian and Indigenous art. The artworks from the collection are on display throughout the UTS campus, including in every building. The university has been expanding its collection of digital and new media works. UTS Central is home to a 12-metre wide digital screen, which showcases large-scale digital artworks by leading Australian artists.

=== Neighbouring organisations ===
The core of the UTS city campus is located close to many Sydney landmarks and notable organisations including the Australian Broadcasting Corporation, the Powerhouse Museum, TAFE NSW Ultimo, the International Convention Centre Sydney, Darling Harbour and Chinatown.

Entities within the Central Park development, opposite the UTS Tower on Broadway, partner with the University on sustainability initiatives, which include a recycled water partnership and a district energy-sharing project commended at the 2018 Smart City Awards.

== Organisation and administration ==
=== University Council ===
==== Chancellor and Vice-Chancellor ====
List of Chancellors

- Peter Johnson (1989—1999)
- Sir Gerard Brennan (1999—2005)
- Vicki Sara (2005—2016)
- Catherine Livingstone (2016—2025)
- Michael Rose (2025—present)

List of Vice-Chancellors

- Gus (Roy David) Guthrie (1988—1996)
- Tony (Anthony John Dyson) Blake (1996—2002)
- Ross Milbourne (2002—2014)
- Attila Brungs (2014—2021)
- Andrew Parfitt (2021—present)

=== Academic Board ===
The UTS Academic Board is the principal advisory body to the UTS Council on academic matters.

The Academic Board is concerned with policy development as it relates to the University's academic programs in education, scholarship and research, and community service. It refers to policy recommendations to Council and discusses matters referred to it by Council.

Academic Board plays a key role in the UTS community in providing a forum for the discussion and debate of the academic directions of the University as well as the quality of its academic programs. The Board consists of academic staff members as well as student members elected for a general period of 1–2 years.

=== Faculties and schools ===
The university consists of a number of faculties and schools:

- UTS Business School
- Faculty of Design and Society
- Faculty of Engineering and Information Technology
- Faculty of Health
- Graduate Research School
- Faculty of Law
- Faculty of Science
- Transdisciplinary School

=== Other entities ===
In addition to the faculties, there are a number other units falling under the Provost and Senior Vice-President's division, within the remit of the Vice-Chancellor and President. As of 2021, these comprise three administrative units (Planning and Quality Unit, UTS Internal Audit and Chief Data Officer), as well as the:

- Centre for Social Justice and Inclusion.
- Jumbunna Institute for Indigenous Education and Research (formerly Jumbunna Indigenous House of Learning).

The Graduate Research School, Institute for Public Policy and Governance, and the Institute for Sustainable Futures fall under the Deputy Vice-Chancellor and Vice-President (Research), a number of units relating to international students are governed by the Deputy Vice-Chancellor and Vice-President (International), and many other administrative units exist under similar divisions under the Vice-Chancellor and President.

==== UTS College ====
UTS College (formerly UTS Insearch) is a private higher education provider and pathways provider to UTS. UTS College provides academic English programs, foundation studies and diplomas, with the option to continue undergraduate studies at UTS. Programs are designed in collaboration with UTS and delivered in smaller class sizes, with additional learning support services. Programs are offered in several locations throughout the world, including Sydney.

== Academic profile ==
=== Admissions ===
Admissions statistics (Note: Includes applicants who apply through UAC, excluding international applicants.)
	2024	2023	2022
Total preferences	46,006	43,365	37,764
First preferences	10,886	10,502	9,498
Total offers	14,389	14,111	12,131

As of 2024, UTS had the third highest demand for places in New South Wales for university applicants.

For domestic applications, an Australian Tertiary Admission Rank (ATAR) is required, with selection ranks varying between courses. Applicants may also be eligible for admission if they have completed a UTS foundation course or an AQF Diploma. Applicants applying with an IB Diploma will have their scores converted into a UAC Rank for admission.

In 2024, statistics by the Universities Admissions Centre (UAC) revealed that the Bachelor of Business program at UTS was the second most in-demand course in the state, with 956 applicants placing it as their first preference. The Bachelor of Nursing program was the ninth most in-demand course with 608 applicants.

=== Rankings ===
University rankings

Global – Overall
- ARWU World: 201–300 (2025)
- CWTS World: 178 (Note: The CWTS Leiden Ranking is based on P (top 10%).) (2024)
- QS World: =87 (2027)
- QS Employability: 62 (2022)
- THE World: =145 (2026)
- THE Reputation: 201–300 (2025)
- USNWR Global: 83 (25/26)

National – Overall
- ARWU National: 9–13 (2025)
- CWTS National: 6 (2024)
- QS National: 9 (2027)
- THE National: 8 (2026)
- USNWR National: 6 (25/26)
- AFR National: =8 (2025)

In the 2024 Aggregate Ranking of Top Universities, which measures aggregate performance across the QS, THE and ARWU rankings, the university attained a position of #140 (9th nationally).

National publications

In the Australian Financial Review Best Universities Ranking 2025, the university was tied #8 amongst Australian universities.

Global publications

In the 2026 Quacquarelli Symonds World University Rankings (published 2025), the university attained a position of #96 (9th nationally).

In the Times Higher Education World University Rankings 2026 (published 2025), the university attained a tied position of #145 (8th nationally).

In the 2025 Academic Ranking of World Universities, the university attained a position of #201–300 (tied 9–13th nationally).

In the 2025–2026 U.S. News & World Report Best Global Universities, the university attained a position of #83 (6th nationally).

In the CWTS Leiden Ranking 2024, the university attained a position of #178 (6th nationally).

=== Student outcomes ===
The Australian Government's QILT (Note: Abbreviation for Quality Indicators for Learning and Teaching.) conducts national surveys documenting the student life cycle from enrolment through to employment. These surveys place more emphasis on criteria such as student experience, graduate outcomes and employer satisfaction than perceived reputation, research output and citation counts.

In the 2023 Employer Satisfaction Survey, graduates of the university had an overall employer satisfaction rate of 86.5%.

In the 2023 Graduate Outcomes Survey, graduates of the university had a full-time employment rate of 77.5% for undergraduates and 87.1% for postgraduates. The initial full-time salary was A$70,000 for undergraduates and A$95,200 for postgraduates.

In the 2023 Student Experience Survey, undergraduates at the university rated the quality of their entire educational experience at 76.9% meanwhile postgraduates rated their overall education experience at 79.6%.

=== Research ===
In the Australian Research Council's State of Australian University Research 2018-19 Excellence in Research for Australia national report, 100% of the university's research was rated at world standard or above. In the accompanying Engagement and Impact Assessment 2018-19 national report, almost 80% of the university's assessed research areas were rated as having a high impact, with the Australian university sector average at 43%.

UTS is home to over 50 research centres and institutes. UTS mainly focuses its research in the areas of health, data science, sustainability, future work, and industry and social futures. As of 2020 some of the major research centres include: Centre for Autonomous System, Centre for Health Technology, Advanced Analytics Institute, Centre for Forensic Science, Centre for Quantum Software and Information, the Australian Institute for Microbiology & Infection (AIMI, formerly the i3 Institute), Climate Change Cluster (C3), and the Institute for Sustainable Future.

The Australian Artificial Intelligence Institute (AAII) was established in March 2017 as the Centre for Artificial Intelligence (CAI), within the School of Computer Science in the Faculty of Engineering and IT. It was elevated to the status of an institute in August 2020, in recognition of its high-quality research and its collaboration with local and international collaboration researchers. As of 2024 it is led by Jie Lu, and has a staff of 35 academic staff, 10 postdoctoral associates, and over 200 PhD students.

== Student life ==
=== Student demographics ===
Demographics of student body
	2024	2023	2022
Female	50%	50%	50%
Under 25	70%	69%	70%
Language other than English	43%	44%	42%
Born outside Australia	44%	45%	43%
Indigenous	1%	1%	1%

In 2024, the university had an enrolment of 51,038 students. 35,453 are undergraduate students and 15,585 postgraduate students. Of all students, 37,231 (73%) are Australian citizens or permanent residents and 13,807 (27%) are international students.

Students were enrolled in 9 schools or faculties: The largest being the Faculty of Engineering and Information Technology at 27.2%, followed by the School of Business at 19.9% and the Faculty of Health at 10.3%.

=== Student union ===
ActivateUTS (formerly UTS Union) operates a range of on-campus student services, including food and beverage outlets, cultural activities, fitness and catering services as well as clubs and societies, student publications and Orientation Day. The City Campus is home to two licensed bars, 'The Underground' and 'The Loft'.

ActivateUTS is governed by a board of thirteen directors consisting of seven students (elected by the student cohort in annual elections), two staff members (elected by the staff of the university), the CEO of ActivateUTS, the chair (appointed by the university council), the treasurer (appointed by the university council) and one other director (appointed by the university council, usually external to the university or a former student). From the seven students elected, a president and a vice-president is elected each year by the board. The chair is responsible for the conduct of the board meetings.

==== Clubs and societies ====
The University of Technology Sydney recognises over 180 clubs and societies. 6,784 students were involved in a club or society in 2021.

During Orientation Day in 2020, there were over 6,765 club membership purchases from 3,505 students, up nearly 200% from the previous year.

=== Student newspaper and radio ===
UTS has its own community radio station on campus, 2SER FM. The studio is located in building 18, known as the terraces, and broadcasts to the entire Sydney region. The station is jointly owned by UTS and Macquarie University, with a second studio at Macquarie University. UTS Journalism students help produce the station's news and current affairs programs including "The Wire" and "Razors Edge".

The UTS Students' Association is the representative student organisation at UTS. It publishes the student newspaper, Vertigo, runs the second hand bookshop and advocates on behalf of students both individually and collectively.

=== Sports and athletics ===
The University of Technology Sydney's sports teams are overseen by UTS Sport. The university sponsors 35 sports clubs, which together has over 4,700 members. Its sports clubs play in a variety of sports, including Australian rules football, basketball, cricket, hockey, netball, rowing, rugby union, soccer, tennis, volleyball and water polo.

UTS were the overall champion at the UniSport Nationals on two occasions (2016, 2017), and were awarded the Spirit of the Games Shield (now known as the John White Spirit Trophy) in 1995. UTS were the overall champion at the Indigenous Nationals on two occasions (2003, 2019). UTS were the overall champion at the Nationals Snow on two occasions (2022, 2023), and were awarded the Spirit of the Mountain Trophy twice, in 2019 and 2023.

UTS supports over 300 student athletes via the UTS Elite Athlete Program each year.

== Notable people ==
=== Notable alumni ===
As of 2024, the University of Technology Sydney has over 280,000 alumni worldwide. The UTS Alumni Awards, which is held annually, recognises graduates of the university who have made important contributions in their field. The university has been home to numerous Fulbright Scholars, John Monash Scholars, one Rhodes Scholar, and one Schwarzman Scholar.

Several notable alumni have served as politicians at either federal, state or local level, or some famus social activists worldwide including former Deputy Leader of the Opposition Tanya Plibersek, former Premier of New South Wales Morris Iemma, former Leader of the Opposition in New South Wales John Robertson, former Deputy Lord Mayor of Sydney Henry Tsang and Current Chinese Social Activist Kong Junyou

Notable alumni in arts and entertainment include actor Hugh Jackman, actress Rachel Ward, actor and comedian Anh Do, actress Natasha Liu Bordizzo, dancer and singer Emma Watkins, comedy writer and performer Chris Taylor, actress Charlotte Best and media personality Sonia Kruger.

Other notable alumni include billionaire entrepreneur Robin Khuda, billionaire businessman Richard White, Gojek CEO Andre Soelistyo, Federal Court judge Jane Needham, businessman David Murray, journalist and anchor Lynda Kinkade, former Crown Prosecutor of New South Wales Margaret Cunneen, cricketer Pat Cummins, businessman Russell Balding, entertainment journalist Brooke Boney, author Janine Shepherd, cricketer Alyssa Healy, economist Cristina Cifuentes, sports journalist Lara Pitt, author Kate Grenville, investigative journalist Caro Meldrum-Hanna, Chinese Minister of Justice He Rong, businesswoman Kim McKay, and Qantas CEO Vanessa Hudson.

== Controversies ==
=== Diane Jolly harassment scandal (2021) ===
In 2021, the former Dean of Science Diane Jolley was found guilty of causing financial disadvantage by deception after orchestrating a campaign of intimidation – against herself – while pushing to cut the UTS traditional Chinese medicine degree. Cutting of the traditional Chinese medicine degree was hotly disputed and a petition of 9000 students and alumni fought to keep the course running affecting more than 20 staff and 250 students at the time. Jolley was sentenced to 2 years 6 months, to be served by way of Intensive Corrections Order for dishonestly causing financial disadvantage by deception by conveying information likely to make a person fear for the safety of a person, knowing that the information was false or misleading.

=== Management, staff distress, and SafeWork intervention (2025) ===
In 2025, UTS launched a cost-cutting plan, dubbed the Operational Sustainability Initiative, aiming to reduce approximately 400 staff roles and save A$100 million, which included suspending nearly 150 course intakes for the 2026 academic year. Staff reported elevated levels of psychological distress amid a perceived lack of consultation and transparency. The National Tertiary Education Union (NTEU) denounced the leadership's handling as symptomatic of serious governance failures, citing budget blow-outs, flawed decision-making and low morale; particularly when the university published 50 tips for staff wellbeing, including washing delicates or flossing teeth. In response to mounting concerns, SafeWork NSW issued a prohibition notice, pausing all redundancy-related meetings and the formal change proposal due to a "serious and imminent risk of psychological harm" to staff. This is an unprecedented step in the history of SafeWork NSW.

== See also ==
- List of universities in Australia
- UTS Glenda Adams Award for New Writing, a literary award sponsored by UTS
