= UTS Tower =

Landmark building of the University of Technology, Sydney

UTS Building 1
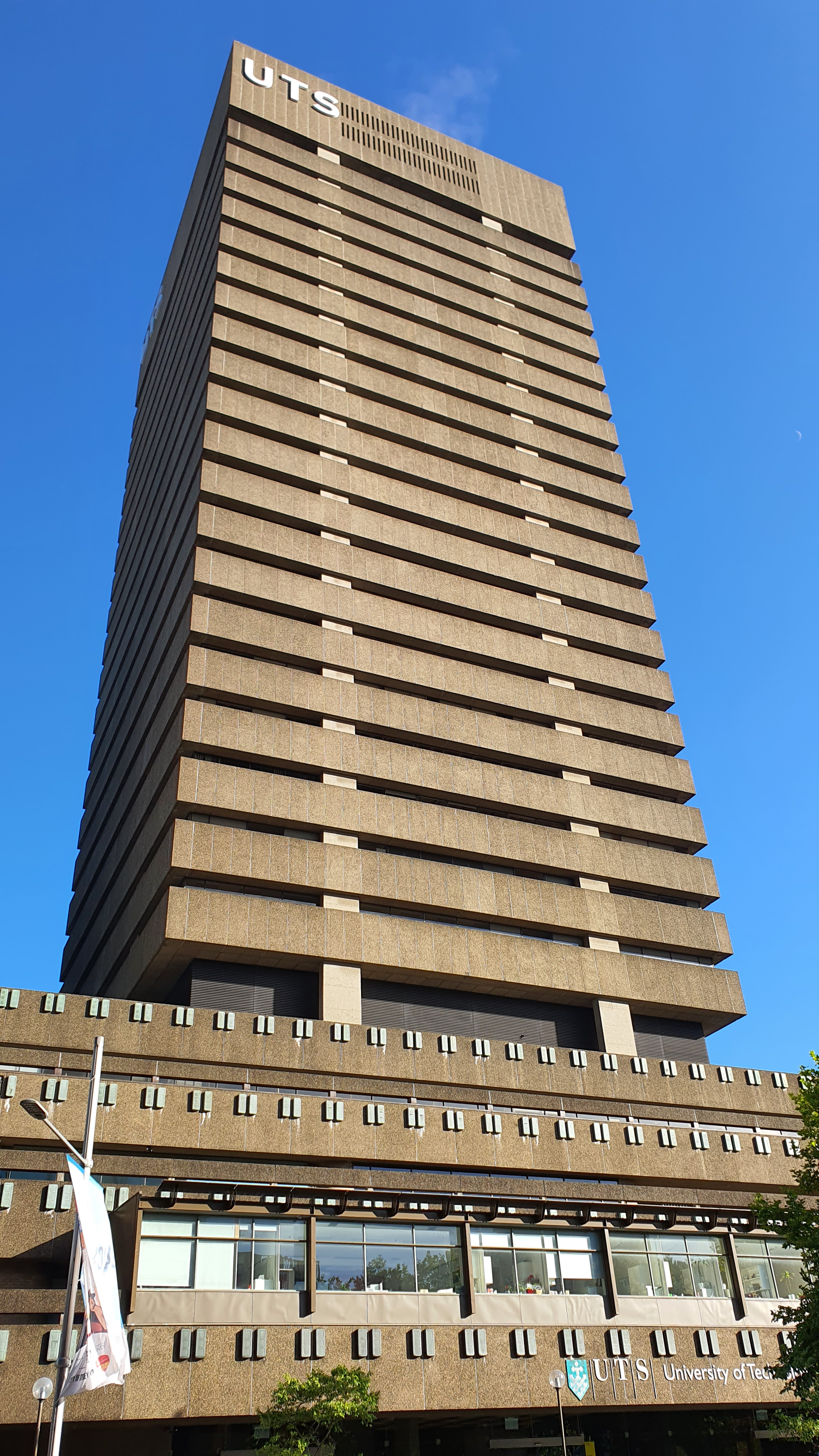
- Alternative names: UTS Central, UTS Tower

General information
- Type: University administration
- Architectural style: Late Twentieth Century Brutalist
- Location: 15 Broadway, Sydney, New South Wales, Australia
- Coordinates: 33°53′01″S 151°12′03″E
- Construction started: 1969
- Opened: October 15, 1979
- Cost: A$32 million
- Client: New South Wales Institute of Technology
- Owner: University of Technology Sydney

Height
- Height: 120 metres (390 ft)

Design and construction
- Architect: Michael Dysart
- Architecture firm: NSW Government Architect's Office

Renovating team
- Renovating firm: Tonkin Zulaikha Greer (2014); Burtenshaw Scoufis (2011–)

UTS Building 1, also known as the UTS Tower, is a landmark building on Broadway at the southern gateway to Sydney's central business district. Many of the administrative units of the University of Technology, Sydney are located across the building's 27 occupied floors. Completed in 1979 in the brutalist architectural style from a 1968 plan by Michael Dysart of the NSW Government Architect's Office, the Tower was officially opened by NSW Premier Neville Wran.

== Location ==
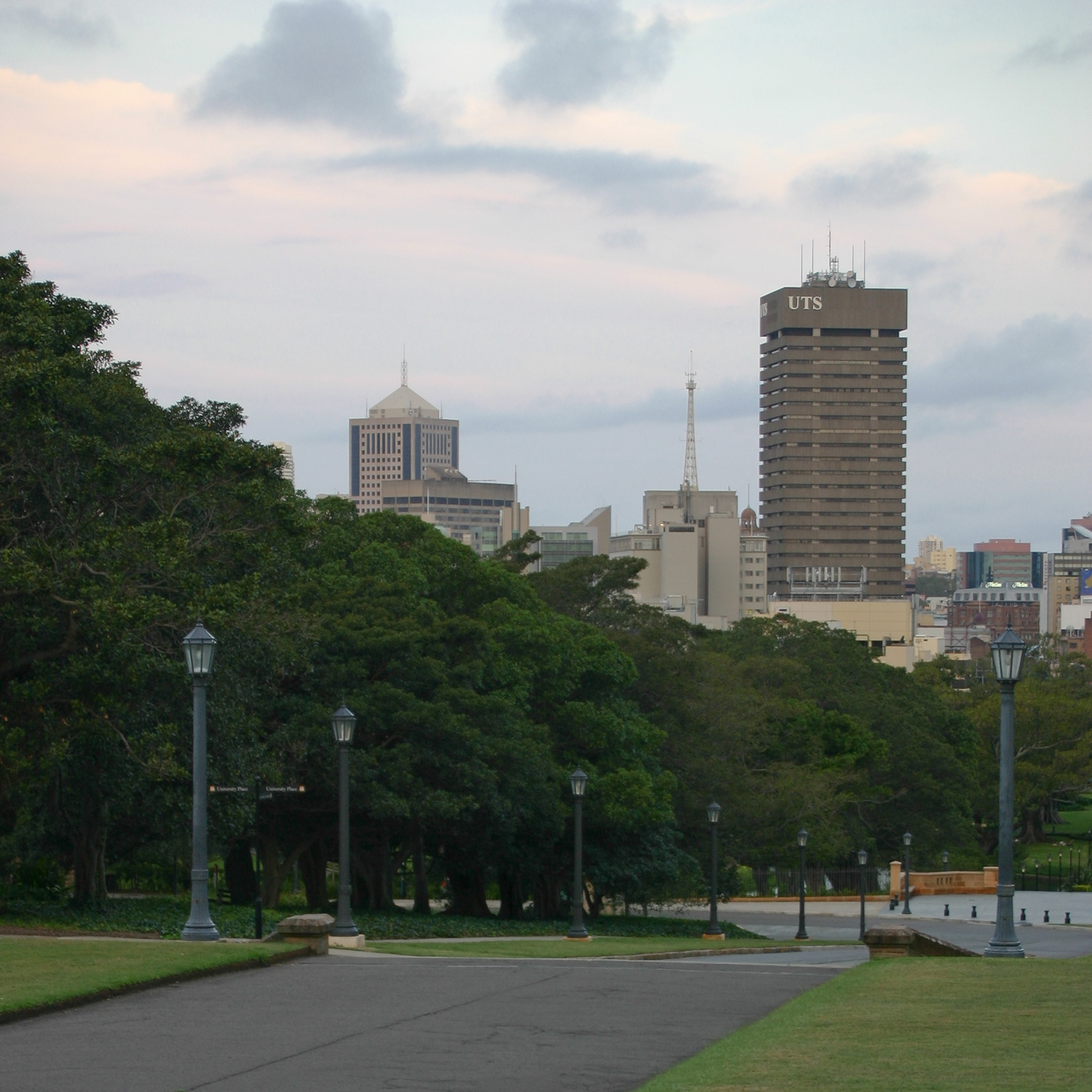
The building as seen from the University of Sydney

The UTS Tower is located at 15 Broadway, Sydney, south of the city's central business district, near to Central Railway station and opposite One Central Park.

It sits between the UTS Bon Marche Building and Terraces (home to radio station 2SER) and the newly constructed UTS Central (Building 2).

== History ==
The original 1964 plan envisaged three towers of varying heights plus a podium. By the mid-1970s, with cutbacks in commonwealth funding, the original plan was reduced to the main Tower and smaller 11-level Building 2 next door.

Construction of the building commenced in 1969 and lower floors were occupied from 1975. The building was officially opened on 15 October 1979 by the NSW Premier Neville Wran where the Tower was declared the tallest educational facility in Australia at the time. The adjoining Building 2 opened in 1980.

Originally occupied by the NSW Institute of Technology, the Tower became part of the newly created University of Technology Sydney in January 1988.

== Criticism of architectural style ==
The Tower has been described very colourfully and identified numerous times as Sydney's ugliest building, notably in The Sydney Morning Herald, and by architect Frank Gehry. Journalist and author Mike Carlton described it as "a menacing concrete monolith in an architectural genre that the old East German Stasi brought to perfection".

The Tower's visibility in the central business district skyline has also been described positively, as marking Sydney as a University town.

=== Proposed redesign ===
One scheme for renovation suggested by Chris Bosse from Laboratory for Visionary Architecture involved covering the building with a lightweight composite mesh textile, which would be able to store rainwater, generate electricity and cool down the building. However, such plans were not taken up by the university beyond a simple refurbishment, with one observer noting: "It may be that, for better or for worse, the Tower is finally valued as an essential part of the University’s identity."

=== Redevelopment of Building 2 ===
As part of the UTS Campus Master Plan, Building 2 next to the Tower was demolished in 2016/2017 to make way for a vibrant new student hub and faculty space for the university. UTS Central (Building 2) opened in August 2019 and features direct pedestrian connections with the UTS Tower across four levels.
