= UTS Vicki Sara Building =

Vicki Sara Building (Building 7)
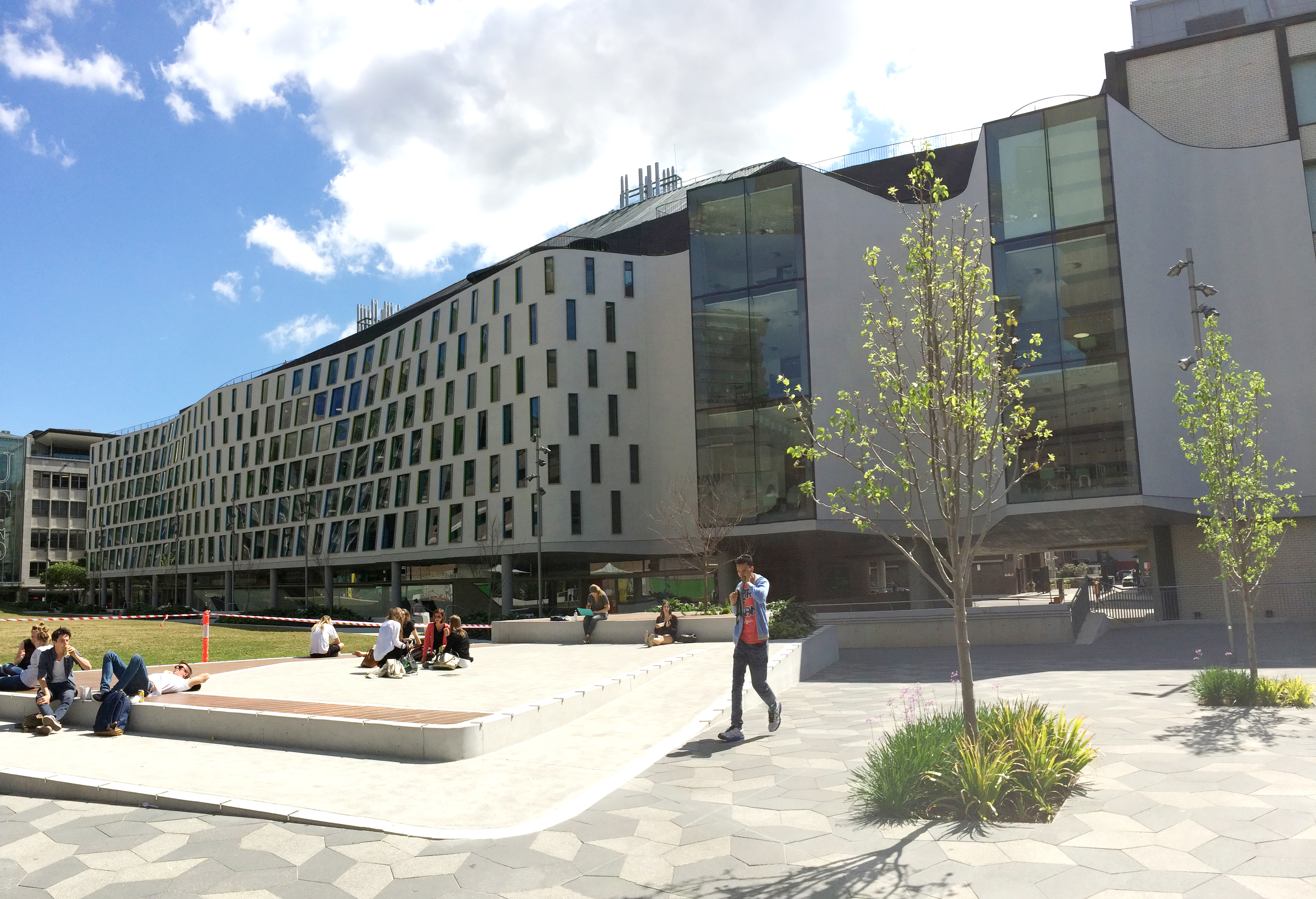
- The UTS Vicki Sara Building
- Interactive map of the Vicki Sara Building (Building 7) area
- Alternative names: Science and Graduate School of Health Building UTS

General information
- Type: commercial
- Location: Corner of Thomas Street and Jones Street, Ultimo, Sydney, Australia
- Coordinates: 33°52′59″S 151°11′58″E
- Completed: October 2014
- Inaugurated: February 2015
- Cost: $154 million (for the Thomas St Project, which also includes Alumni Green and an underground Library Retrieval System)

Technical details
- Floor area: Gross building area: 13,800m2 Usable floor area: 8,900m2 Six levels (including plant) + 3 underground plant and laboratory levels

Design and construction
- Architect: Durbach Block Jaggers in association with BVN Architecture
- Main contractor: Richard Crookes Constructions

The UTS Vicki Sara Building, also known as the Science Faculty Building, is the building housing the Faculty of Science and the Graduate School of Health in the University of Technology Sydney in New South Wales, Australia. It is the third building to be opened under the plan for $154 million worth of structures designed by Durbach Block Jaggers (DBJ) in association with BVN Architecture constructed by Richard Crookes Constructions. The building is located in the City Campus at 67 Thomas St, Ultimo. It was completed in October 2014 and opened for teaching in February 2015. The building has 8 levels that provide spaces for over 1200 staff and students including teaching, learning and research facilities.

The organic form of the building is inspired by the shapes of grove of trees. The undulatory form of the building is inflected by 700 multi-colored, box-like openings piercing the glossy off-white surface of the façade. The external cladding has been crafted from 75% recycled glass.

== Features ==
=== Spiral staircase ===
A large spiral staircase allows light to penetrate the building from above.

=== Super Lab ===
The Super Lab is a 52-metre-long room which can accommodate up to 220 students. It is configured into 12 different classrooms, allowing different classes to be held simultaneously.

=== Green auditorium ===
The auditorium was designed with conical flask lighting which produce a green hue, thought to encourage creativity and a state of calmness.

== Sustainability ==
Sustainability measures in the building include: a green roof for research, external cladding made out of 75% recycled glass, and a 27,000-litre rainwater tank supply of recycled water for the rooftop garden and the building's toilets. The ventilation system has been integrated with a natural cooling system which reduces energy use by up to 20%.

The Faculty of Science and Graduate School of Health Building has used many strategies in order to improve sustainability. Critical environmental practices include:

- Rainwater harvesting
- Water-saving sanitary appliances
- Sustainable building materials
- Recycled materials
- Low-emitting materials and finishes
- Sustainable urban drainage system
- Smart design (passive design strategies)
- Maximised daylighting system.

== Notable awards ==
- 2015 NSW Architecture Awards: Inaugural William E. Kemp Award for Educational Architecture.
- 2015 Sydney Design Awards: Gold Winner, Architecture – Mixed Use – Constructed.

== Gallery ==
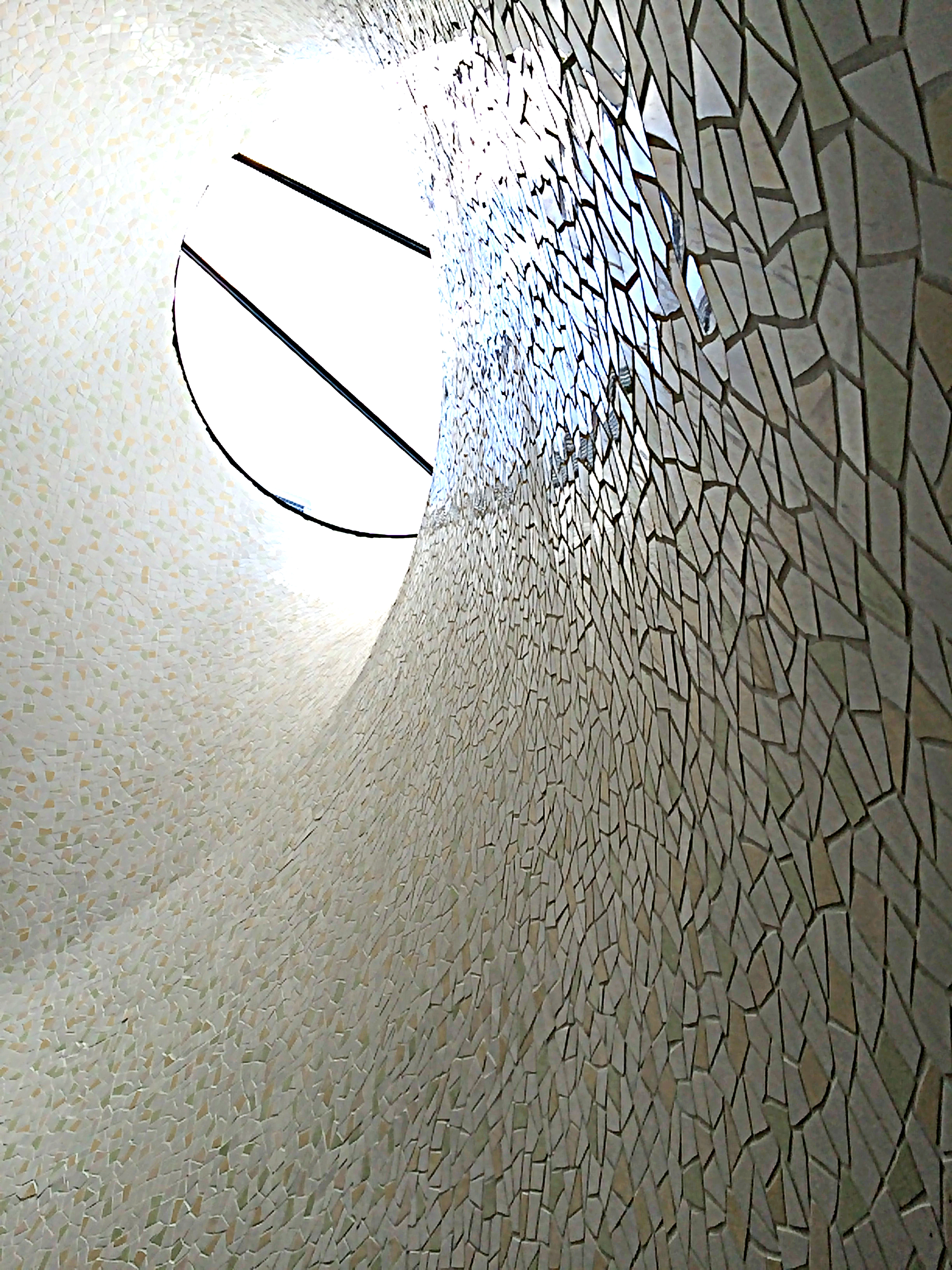
Detail view of pastel tiles and skylight constructed over spiral staircase

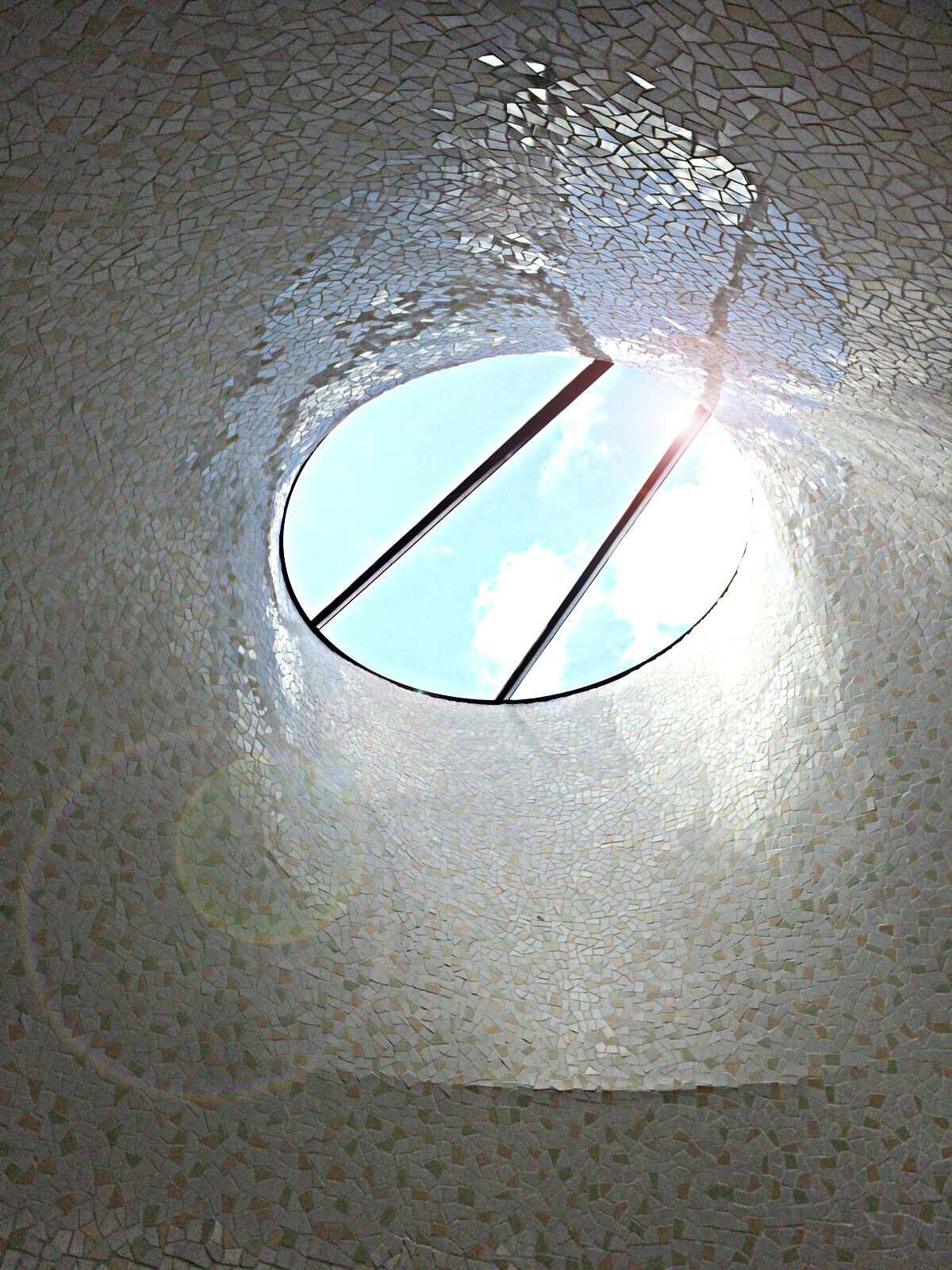
Perspective from the skylight constructed over spiral staircase

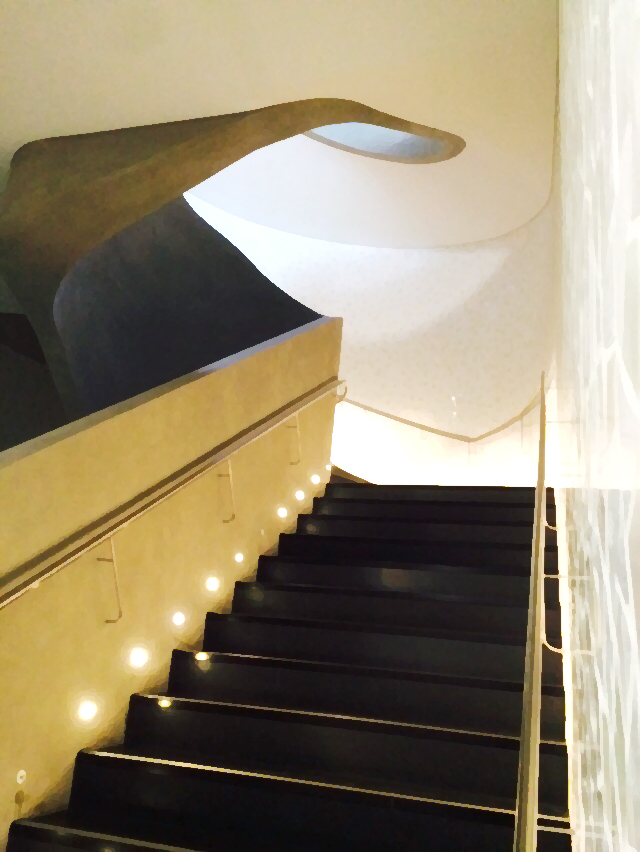
Spiral concrete staircase

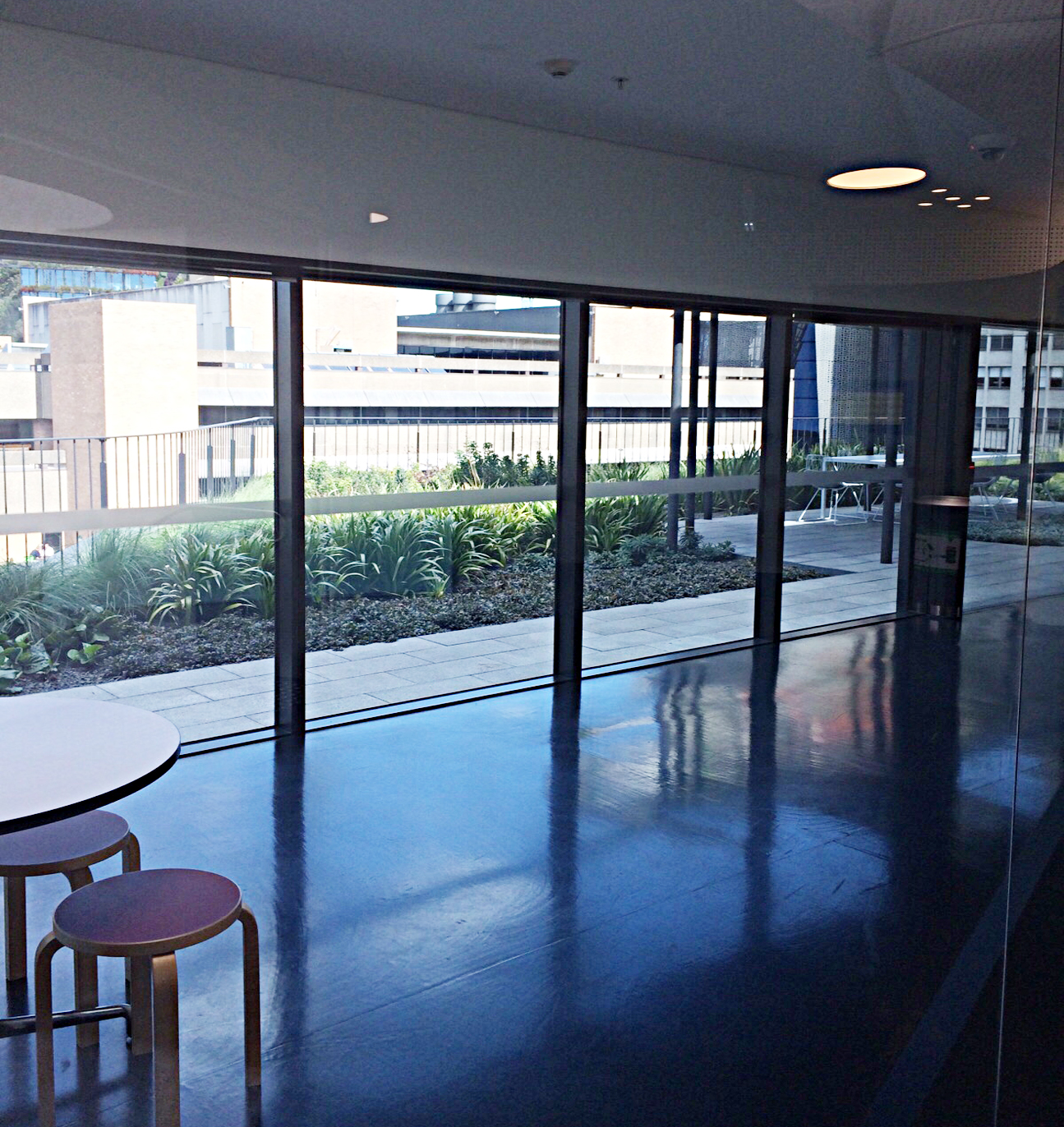
Green balcony (Level 1)

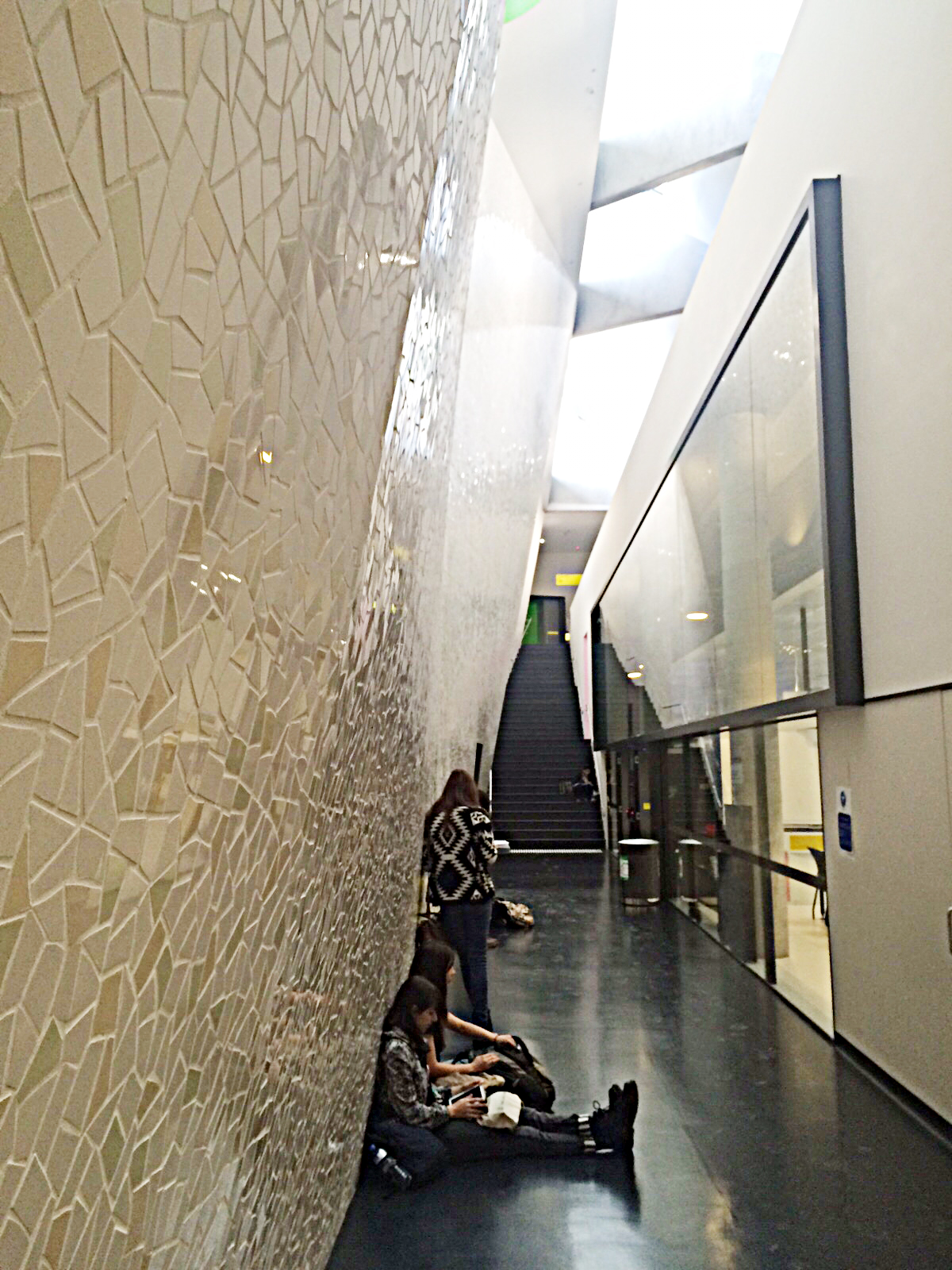
Corridor and entrance to Super Labs (Level 2)

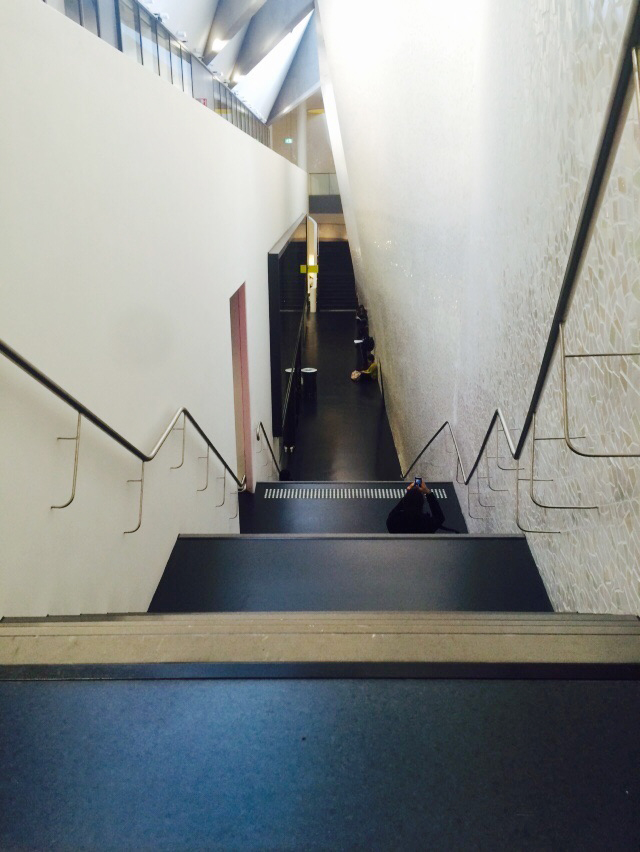
The skylight facing Alumni Green

== See also ==
- Holman House, Dover Heights
- List of universities in Australia
