= 2024 Men's African Handball Club Cup Winners Championship =

2024 Men's African Club Cup Winners Championship
البطولة الإفريقية للأندية الفائزة بالكؤوس 2024

Tournament details
- Host country: Algeria
- Venues: 2 (in 1 host city)
- Dates: 18-27 April
- Teams: 11 (from 1 confederation)

Final positions
- Champions: (Tunisia) ES Tunis (4th title)
- Runners-up: (Egypt) Zamalek
- Third place: (Egypt) Al Ahly
- Fourth place: (Algeria) JSE Skikda

Tournament statistics
- Matches played: 30
- Goals scored: 1,629 (54.3 per match)

The 2024 Men's African Club Cup Winners Championship is the 40th edition of the African Handball Cup Winners' Cup, organized by the African Handball Confederation, under the auspices of the International Handball Federation, the handball sport governing body. The tournament will be held from the 18 to 27 April 2024 in Oran, Algeria.

== Teams ==
For the first time, twelve teams take part to the tournament. AS Caïman from Congo withdrew the tournament, it was replaced by the Algerian team CRB Mila. APR HC of Rwanda withdrew the tournament after coming in Oran.

Participating teams
(Algeria) OM Annaba (wnc)	(Algeria) HBC El Biar (rnc)	(Algeria) ES Ain Touta	(Algeria) JSE Skikda
(Algeria) CRB Mila	(Republic of the Congo) BMC	(Democratic Republic of the Congo) JS Kinshasa	(Egypt) Al Ahly (wnc)
(Egypt) Zamalek	(Ivory Coast) Red Star	(Tunisia) ES Tunis wnc)	

== Venues ==
Cities	Venues	Capacity
Bir El Djir (Oran east)	Miloud Hadefi Complex Omnisport Arena	7,000
Mdina Jdida (Oran center)	Hamou Boutlélis Sports Palace	5,000

== Preliminary rounds ==
=== Group A ===
Pos	Team	Pld	W	D	L	GF	GA	GD	Pts	Qualification
1	(Egypt) Al Ahly	2	2	0	0	66	50	+16	4	Main rounds
2	(Algeria) JSE Skikda	2	1	0	1	44	53	−9	2	Main rounds
3	(Algeria) ES Ain Touta	2	0	0	2	54	61	−7	0	Classification playoffs (9–12th places)

Rules for classification: 1) points; 2) head-to-head points; 3) head-to-head goal difference; 4) head-to-head number of goals scored; 5) goal difference.

18 April 2024; 20:00 WAT (UTC+1)	ES Ain Touta (Algeria)	23–25	(Algeria) JSE Skikda	Miloud Hadefi Complex Omnisport Arena, Oran; Attendance: 500; Referees: Awedni, Zribi (TUN)
18 April 2024; 20:00 WAT (UTC+1)	Amokrane, Djebrouni 5	(10–14)	Bounab 8	Miloud Hadefi Complex Omnisport Arena, Oran; Attendance: 500; Referees: Awedni, Zribi (TUN)
18 April 2024; 20:00 WAT (UTC+1)	1× (yellow card) 3× (suspension)	Report	1× (yellow card) 2× (suspension)	Miloud Hadefi Complex Omnisport Arena, Oran; Attendance: 500; Referees: Awedni, Zribi (TUN)

19 April 2024; 18:00 WAT (UTC+1)	Al Ahly (Egypt)	36–31	(Algeria) ES Ain Touta	Miloud Hadefi Complex Omnisport Arena, Oran
19 April 2024; 18:00 WAT (UTC+1)		(16–15)		Miloud Hadefi Complex Omnisport Arena, Oran

20 April 2024; 18:00 WAT (UTC+1)	JSE Skikda (Algeria)	19–30	(Egypt) Al Ahly	Hamou Boutlélis Sports Palace, Oran
20 April 2024; 18:00 WAT (UTC+1)		(8–17)		Hamou Boutlélis Sports Palace, Oran

=== Group B ===
Pos	Team	Pld	W	D	L	GF	GA	GD	Pts	Qualification
1	(Algeria) OM Annaba	2	2	0	0	58	47	+11	4	Main rounds
2	(Algeria) CRB Mila	2	0	1	1	50	53	−3	1	Main rounds
3	(Ivory Coast) Red Star	2	0	1	1	43	51	−8	1	Classification playoffs (9–12th places)

Rules for classification: 1) points; 2) head-to-head points; 3) head-to-head goal difference; 4) head-to-head number of goals scored; 5) goal difference.

18 April 2024; 21:30 WAT (UTC+1)	Red Star (Ivory Coast)	20–28	(Algeria) OM Annaba	Hamou Boutlélis Sports Palace, Oran
18 April 2024; 21:30 WAT (UTC+1)		(12–15)		Hamou Boutlélis Sports Palace, Oran

19 April 2024; 16:00 WAT (UTC+1)	CRB Mila (Algeria)	27–30	(Algeria) OM Annaba	Miloud Hadefi Complex Omnisport Arena, Oran
19 April 2024; 16:00 WAT (UTC+1)		(14–13)		Miloud Hadefi Complex Omnisport Arena, Oran

20 April 2024; 18:00 WAT (UTC+1)	CRB Mila (Algeria)	23–23	(Ivory Coast) Red Star	Miloud Hadefi Complex Omnisport Arena, Oran
20 April 2024; 18:00 WAT (UTC+1)		(8–12)		Miloud Hadefi Complex Omnisport Arena, Oran

=== Group C ===
Pos	Team	Pld	W	D	L	GF	GA	GD	Pts	Qualification
1	(Algeria) HBC El Biar	2	2	0	0	67	44	+23	4	Main rounds
2	(Democratic Republic of the Congo) JS Kinshasa	2	0	0	2	44	67	−23	0	Main rounds
3	(Rwanda) APR HC	0	0	0	0	0	0	0	0	Withrew

Rules for classification: 1) points; 2) head-to-head points; 3) head-to-head goal difference; 4) head-to-head number of goals scored; 5) goal difference.

18 April 2024; 20:00 WAT (UTC+1)	HBC El Biar (Algeria)	30–21	(Democratic Republic of the Congo) JS Kinshasa	Hamou Boutlélis Sports Palace, Oran
18 April 2024; 20:00 WAT (UTC+1)		(14–10)		Hamou Boutlélis Sports Palace, Oran

19 April 2024; 16:00 WAT (UTC+1)	APR HC (Rwanda)	Canceled	(Algeria) HBC El Biar	Hamou Boutlélis Sports Palace, Oran

20 April 2024; 14:00 WAT (UTC+1)	JS Kinshasa (Democratic Republic of the Congo)	Canceled	(Rwanda) APR HC	Hamou Boutlélis Sports Palace, Oran

20 April 2024; 14:00 WAT (UTC+1)	JS Kinshasa (Democratic Republic of the Congo)	23–37	(Algeria) HBC El Biar	Hamou Boutlélis Sports Palace, Oran
20 April 2024; 14:00 WAT (UTC+1)		(9–18)		Hamou Boutlélis Sports Palace, Oran

=== Group D ===
Pos	Team	Pld	W	D	L	GF	GA	GD	Pts	Qualification
1	(Egypt) Zamalek	2	2	0	0	63	51	+12	4	Main rounds
2	(Tunisia) ES Tunis	2	1	0	1	70	64	+6	2	Main rounds
3	(Republic of the Congo) BMC	2	0	0	2	46	64	−18	0	Classification playoffs (9–12th places)

Rules for classification: 1) points; 2) head-to-head points; 3) head-to-head goal difference; 4) head-to-head number of goals scored; 5) goal difference.

18 April 2024; 16:00 WAT (UTC+1)	Zamalek (Egypt)	26–19	(Republic of the Congo) BMC	Miloud Hadefi Complex Omnisport Arena, Oran; Attendance: 500; Referees: Ghoul, Chergui (ALG)
18 April 2024; 16:00 WAT (UTC+1)	Zaki 6	(15–7)	Adjeng 6	Miloud Hadefi Complex Omnisport Arena, Oran; Attendance: 500; Referees: Ghoul, Chergui (ALG)
18 April 2024; 16:00 WAT (UTC+1)	1× (suspension)	Report	1× (yellow card) 5× (suspension)	Miloud Hadefi Complex Omnisport Arena, Oran; Attendance: 500; Referees: Ghoul, Chergui (ALG)

19 April 2024; 18:00 WAT (UTC+1)	BMC (Republic of the Congo)	27–38	(Tunisia) ES Tunis	Hamou Boutlélis Sports Palace, Oran
19 April 2024; 18:00 WAT (UTC+1)		(12–22)		Hamou Boutlélis Sports Palace, Oran

20 April 2024; 20:00 WAT (UTC+1)	ES Tunis (Tunisia)	32–37	(Egypt) Zamalek	Hamou Boutlélis Sports Palace, Oran
20 April 2024; 20:00 WAT (UTC+1)		(15–19)		Hamou Boutlélis Sports Palace, Oran

== Main rounds ==
=== Group MI ===
Pos	Team	Pld	W	D	L	GF	GA	GD	Pts	Qualification
1	(Egypt) Al Ahly	1	1	0	0	40	19	+21	2	Knockout stage
2	(Algeria) JSE Skikda	1	1	0	0	26	23	+3	2	Knockout stage
3	(Algeria) OM Annaba	1	0	0	1	23	26	−3	0	Knockout stage
4	(Algeria) CRB Mila	1	0	0	1	19	40	−21	0	Knockout stage

Rules for classification: 1) points; 2) head-to-head points; 3) head-to-head goal difference; 4) head-to-head number of goals scored; 5) goal difference.

22 April 2024; 14:00 WAT (UTC+1)	CRB Mila (Algeria)	19–40	(Egypt) Al Ahly	Miloud Hadefi Complex Omnisport Arena, Oran; Attendance: 500; Referees: Koné, Yapo (CIV)
22 April 2024; 14:00 WAT (UTC+1)	Boutra, Deghoul 4	(11–19)	Seif Eldin 9	Miloud Hadefi Complex Omnisport Arena, Oran; Attendance: 500; Referees: Koné, Yapo (CIV)
22 April 2024; 14:00 WAT (UTC+1)	1× (yellow card) 2× (suspension)	Report	1× (yellow card) 5× (suspension)	Miloud Hadefi Complex Omnisport Arena, Oran; Attendance: 500; Referees: Koné, Yapo (CIV)

22 April 2024; 16:00 WAT (UTC+1)	OM Annaba (Algeria)	23–26	(Algeria) JSE Skikda	Miloud Hadefi Complex Omnisport Arena, Oran; Attendance: 500; Referees: Hamdy, Mahmoud (EGY)
22 April 2024; 16:00 WAT (UTC+1)	Boudjerada, Guermache, Berriah 5	(11–12)	Bounab 8	Miloud Hadefi Complex Omnisport Arena, Oran; Attendance: 500; Referees: Hamdy, Mahmoud (EGY)
22 April 2024; 16:00 WAT (UTC+1)	1× (yellow card) 3× (suspension)	Report	1× (yellow card) 3× (suspension) 1× (red card)	Miloud Hadefi Complex Omnisport Arena, Oran; Attendance: 500; Referees: Hamdy, Mahmoud (EGY)

=== Group MII ===
Pos	Team	Pld	W	D	L	GF	GA	GD	Pts	Qualification
1	(Egypt) Zamalek	1	1	0	0	41	21	+20	2	Knockout stage
2	(Tunisia) ES Tunis	1	1	0	0	25	23	+2	2	Knockout stage
3	(Algeria) HBC El Biar	1	0	0	1	23	25	−2	0	Knockout stage
4	(Democratic Republic of the Congo) JS Kinshasa	1	0	0	1	21	41	−20	0	Knockout stage

Rules for classification: 1) points; 2) head-to-head points; 3) head-to-head goal difference; 4) head-to-head number of goals scored; 5) goal difference.

22 April 2024; 20:00 WAT (UTC+1)	HBC El Biar (Algeria)	23–25	(Tunisia) ES Tunis	Miloud Hadefi Complex Omnisport Arena, Oran; Attendance: 500; Referees: Faye, Fadel (SEN)
22 April 2024; 20:00 WAT (UTC+1)	Salmi 5	(12–13)	Becha 5	Miloud Hadefi Complex Omnisport Arena, Oran; Attendance: 500; Referees: Faye, Fadel (SEN)
22 April 2024; 20:00 WAT (UTC+1)	1× (yellow card) 2× (suspension)	Report	1× (yellow card)	Miloud Hadefi Complex Omnisport Arena, Oran; Attendance: 500; Referees: Faye, Fadel (SEN)

22 April 2024; 20:00 WAT (UTC+1)	JS Kinshasa (Democratic Republic of the Congo)	21–41	(Egypt) Zamalek	Hamou Boutlélis Sports Palace, Oran
22 April 2024; 20:00 WAT (UTC+1)		(10–20)		Hamou Boutlélis Sports Palace, Oran

== Knockout stage ==
Championship bracket

Quarter-finals
23 Apr 2024 – 20:00
(Egypt) Al Ahly	40
(Algeria) OM Annaba	21
23 Apr 2024 – 16:00
(Tunisia) ES Tunis	38
(Democratic Republic of the Congo) JS Kinshasa	25
23 Apr 2024 – 16:00
(Egypt) Zamalek	28
(Algeria) HBC El Biar	25
23 Apr 2024 – 20:00
(Algeria) JSE Skikda	26
(Algeria) CRB Mila	18

Semi-finals
25 Apr 2024 – 14:00
(Egypt) Al Ahly	21
(Tunisia) ES Tunis	25
25 Apr 2024 – 19:00
(Egypt) Zamalek	30
(Algeria) JSE Skikda	26

Final
27 Apr 2024 – 18:30
(Tunisia) ES Tunis	30
(Egypt) Zamalek	25
Third place
27 Apr 2024 – 14:00
(Egypt) Al Ahly	37
(Algeria) JSE Skikda	28

=== Quarter-finals ===
23 April 2024; 20:00 WAT (UTC+1)	Al Ahly (Egypt)	40–21	(Algeria) OM Annaba	Miloud Hadefi Complex Omnisport Arena, Oran; Attendance: 500; Referees: Awedni, Zribi (TUN)
23 April 2024; 20:00 WAT (UTC+1)	Khairy, Adel 6	(19–13)	Boudjerada 10	Miloud Hadefi Complex Omnisport Arena, Oran; Attendance: 500; Referees: Awedni, Zribi (TUN)
23 April 2024; 20:00 WAT (UTC+1)	2× (suspension)	Report	1× (yellow card) 3× (suspension)	Miloud Hadefi Complex Omnisport Arena, Oran; Attendance: 500; Referees: Awedni, Zribi (TUN)

23 April 2024; 16:00 WAT (UTC+1)	ES Tunis (Tunisia)	38–25	(Democratic Republic of the Congo) JS Kinshasa	Hamou Boutlélis Sports Palace, Oran; Attendance: 500
23 April 2024; 16:00 WAT (UTC+1)	Boughanmi 10	(16–17)	Ruben 9	Hamou Boutlélis Sports Palace, Oran; Attendance: 500
23 April 2024; 16:00 WAT (UTC+1)	3× (suspension)	Report		Hamou Boutlélis Sports Palace, Oran; Attendance: 500

23 April 2024; 16:00 WAT (UTC+1)	Zamalek (Egypt)	28–25	(Algeria) HBC El Biar	Miloud Hadefi Complex Omnisport Arena, Oran; Attendance: 500; Referees: Faye, Fadel (SEN)
23 April 2024; 16:00 WAT (UTC+1)	Saad 7	(14–11)	Abrous 7	Miloud Hadefi Complex Omnisport Arena, Oran; Attendance: 500; Referees: Faye, Fadel (SEN)
23 April 2024; 16:00 WAT (UTC+1)	2× (suspension)	Report		Miloud Hadefi Complex Omnisport Arena, Oran; Attendance: 500; Referees: Faye, Fadel (SEN)

23 April 2024; 20:00 WAT (UTC+1)	JSE Skikda (Algeria)	26–18	(Algeria) CRB Mila	Hamou Boutlélis Sports Palace, Oran; Attendance: 500; Referees: Y. El Saied, H. El Saied (EGY)
23 April 2024; 20:00 WAT (UTC+1)	Haouchette 6	(12–7)	Ameziane 6	Hamou Boutlélis Sports Palace, Oran; Attendance: 500; Referees: Y. El Saied, H. El Saied (EGY)
23 April 2024; 20:00 WAT (UTC+1)	1× (suspension)	Report	1× (yellow card) 5× (suspension)	Hamou Boutlélis Sports Palace, Oran; Attendance: 500; Referees: Y. El Saied, H. El Saied (EGY)

=== Semi-finals ===
25 April 2024; 14:00 WAT (UTC+1)	Al Ahly (Egypt)	21–25	(Tunisia) ES Tunis	Miloud Hadefi Complex Omnisport Arena, Oran; Attendance: 500; Referees: Hamidi, Belkhiri (ALG)
25 April 2024; 14:00 WAT (UTC+1)	Ahmed, Abdou 4	(9–10)	Boughanmi 6	Miloud Hadefi Complex Omnisport Arena, Oran; Attendance: 500; Referees: Hamidi, Belkhiri (ALG)
25 April 2024; 14:00 WAT (UTC+1)	5× (suspension)	Report	8× (suspension)	Miloud Hadefi Complex Omnisport Arena, Oran; Attendance: 500; Referees: Hamidi, Belkhiri (ALG)

25 April 2024; 19:00 WAT (UTC+1)	Zamalek (Egypt)	30–26	(Algeria) JSE Skikda	Miloud Hadefi Complex Omnisport Arena, Oran; Attendance: 500; Referees: Faye, Fadel (SEN)
25 April 2024; 19:00 WAT (UTC+1)	Saad 5	(20–12)	Haouchette, Boulahsa 6	Miloud Hadefi Complex Omnisport Arena, Oran; Attendance: 500; Referees: Faye, Fadel (SEN)
25 April 2024; 19:00 WAT (UTC+1)	1× (yellow card) 2× (suspension)	Report	2× (suspension)	Miloud Hadefi Complex Omnisport Arena, Oran; Attendance: 500; Referees: Faye, Fadel (SEN)

=== Third place match ===
27 April 2024; 14:00 WAT (UTC+1)	Al Ahly (Egypt)	37–28	(Algeria) JSE Skikda	Miloud Hadefi Complex Omnisport Arena, Oran; Attendance: 500; Referees: Awedni, Zribi (TUN)
27 April 2024; 14:00 WAT (UTC+1)	Hassan 7	(19–15)	Bouadila 8	Miloud Hadefi Complex Omnisport Arena, Oran; Attendance: 500; Referees: Awedni, Zribi (TUN)
27 April 2024; 14:00 WAT (UTC+1)	3× (suspension)	Report	2× (suspension)	Miloud Hadefi Complex Omnisport Arena, Oran; Attendance: 500; Referees: Awedni, Zribi (TUN)

=== Final ===
27 April 2024; 18:30 WAT (UTC+1)	ES Tunis (Tunisia)	30–25	(Egypt) Zamalek	Miloud Hadefi Complex Omnisport Arena, Oran; Attendance: 500; Referees: Hamidi, Belkhiri (ALG)
27 April 2024; 18:30 WAT (UTC+1)	Becha 7	(16–11)	four players 5	Miloud Hadefi Complex Omnisport Arena, Oran; Attendance: 500; Referees: Hamidi, Belkhiri (ALG)
27 April 2024; 18:30 WAT (UTC+1)	1× (yellow card) 7× (suspension)	Report	3× (suspension)	Miloud Hadefi Complex Omnisport Arena, Oran; Attendance: 500; Referees: Hamidi, Belkhiri (ALG)

== Classification play-offs ==
=== 9–12th places ===
Pos	Team	Pld	W	D	L	GF	GA	GD	Pts
1	(Republic of the Congo) BMC	2	2	0	0	58	45	+13	4
2	(Algeria) ES Ain Touta	2	1	0	1	60	49	+11	2
3	(Ivory Coast) Red Star	2	0	0	2	44	68	−24	0

Rules for classification: 1) points; 2) head-to-head points; 3) head-to-head goal difference; 4) head-to-head number of goals scored; 5) goal difference.

24 April 2024; 14:00 WAT (UTC+1)	ES Ain Touta (Algeria)	36–23	(Ivory Coast) Red Star	Hamou Boutlélis Sports Palace, Oran; Attendance: 500; Referees: Berebere, Sahgui (BEN)
24 April 2024; 14:00 WAT (UTC+1)	Salaheddine 11	(16–13)	Nagalourou 6	Hamou Boutlélis Sports Palace, Oran; Attendance: 500; Referees: Berebere, Sahgui (BEN)
24 April 2024; 14:00 WAT (UTC+1)	4× (suspension)	Report	6× (suspension)	Hamou Boutlélis Sports Palace, Oran; Attendance: 500; Referees: Berebere, Sahgui (BEN)

25 April 2024; 16:00 WAT (UTC+1)	Red Star (Ivory Coast)	21–32	(Republic of the Congo) BMC	Hamou Boutlélis Sports Palace, Oran; Attendance: 500
25 April 2024; 16:00 WAT (UTC+1)	Aho 8	(11–16)	Adjeng 11	Hamou Boutlélis Sports Palace, Oran; Attendance: 500
25 April 2024; 16:00 WAT (UTC+1)	1× (suspension) 1× (red card)	Report	3× (suspension)	Hamou Boutlélis Sports Palace, Oran; Attendance: 500

April 2024; 11:00 WAT (UTC+1)	BMC (Republic of the Congo)	26–24	(Algeria) ES Ain Touta	Hamou Boutlélis Sports Palace, Oran
April 2024; 11:00 WAT (UTC+1)		(14–12)		Hamou Boutlélis Sports Palace, Oran

=== 5–8th places ===
5–8th place
24 Apr 2024
(Algeria) OM Annaba	24
(Democratic Republic of the Congo) JS Kinshasa	21
24 Apr 2024
(Algeria) CRB Mila	23
(Algeria) HBC El Biar	30

Fifth place
27 Apr 2024
(Algeria) OM Annaba	19
(Algeria) HBC El Biar	22
Seventh place
27 Apr 2024
(Democratic Republic of the Congo) JS Kinshasa	33
(Algeria) CRB Mila	29

==== 5–8th place matches ====
24 April 2024; 18:00 WAT (UTC+1)	OM Annaba (Algeria)	24–21	(Democratic Republic of the Congo) JS Kinshasa	Miloud Hadefi Complex Omnisport Arena, Oran; Attendance: 500; Referees: Y. El Saied, H. El Saied (EGY)
24 April 2024; 18:00 WAT (UTC+1)	Chekkat 8	(12–8)	Ruben, Lombé 4	Miloud Hadefi Complex Omnisport Arena, Oran; Attendance: 500; Referees: Y. El Saied, H. El Saied (EGY)
24 April 2024; 18:00 WAT (UTC+1)	1× (yellow card) 2× (suspension)	Report	1× (suspension)	Miloud Hadefi Complex Omnisport Arena, Oran; Attendance: 500; Referees: Y. El Saied, H. El Saied (EGY)

24 April 2024; 18:00 WAT (UTC+1)	CRB Mila (Algeria)	23–30	(Algeria) HBC El Biar	Hamou Boutlélis Sports Palace, Oran; Attendance: 500; Referees: Hamdy, Mahmoud (EGY)
24 April 2024; 18:00 WAT (UTC+1)	Haddadi, Allag 5	(12–14)	Arib, Remili 4	Hamou Boutlélis Sports Palace, Oran; Attendance: 500; Referees: Hamdy, Mahmoud (EGY)
24 April 2024; 18:00 WAT (UTC+1)	1× (suspension) 1× (red card)	Report	6× (suspension)	Hamou Boutlélis Sports Palace, Oran; Attendance: 500; Referees: Hamdy, Mahmoud (EGY)

==== Seventh place ====
27 April 2024; 9:00 WAT (UTC+1)	JS Kinshasa (Democratic Republic of the Congo)	33–29	(Algeria) CRB Mila	Hamou Boutlélis Sports Palace, Oran; Attendance: 500
27 April 2024; 9:00 WAT (UTC+1)	Lombé, Notsawo 8	(20–19)	Deghoul 11	Hamou Boutlélis Sports Palace, Oran; Attendance: 500
27 April 2024; 9:00 WAT (UTC+1)	1× (yellow card) 2× (suspension)	Report	4× (suspension)	Hamou Boutlélis Sports Palace, Oran; Attendance: 500

==== Fifth place ====
27 April 2024; 10:00 WAT (UTC+1)	OM Annaba (Algeria)	19–22	(Algeria) HBC El Biar	Miloud Hadefi Complex Omnisport Arena, Oran; Attendance: 500; Referees: Hamdy, Mahmoud (EGY)
27 April 2024; 10:00 WAT (UTC+1)	Benamara 5	(10–11)	Abrous 4	Miloud Hadefi Complex Omnisport Arena, Oran; Attendance: 500; Referees: Hamdy, Mahmoud (EGY)
27 April 2024; 10:00 WAT (UTC+1)	4× (suspension)	Report	4× (suspension)	Miloud Hadefi Complex Omnisport Arena, Oran; Attendance: 500; Referees: Hamdy, Mahmoud (EGY)

== Final standings ==
Rank	Team
Gold medal	(Tunisia) ES Tunis
Silver medal	(Egypt) Zamalek
Bronze medal	(Egypt) Al Ahly SC
4	(Algeria) JSE Skikda
5	(Algeria) HBC El Biar
6	(Algeria) OM Annaba
7	(Democratic Republic of the Congo) JS Kinshasa
8	(Algeria) CRB Mila
9	(Republic of the Congo) BMC
10	(Algeria) EC Ain Touta
11	(Ivory Coast) Red Star
