= 2024 Women's African Handball Club Cup Winners Championship =

2024 Women's African Club Cup Winners Championship
البطولة الإفريقية للأندية الفائزة بالكؤوس 2024

Tournament details
- Host country: Algeria
- Venue(s): 2 (in 1 host city)
- Dates: 18-27 April
- Teams: 8 (from 1 confederation)

Final positions
- Champions: (Angola) Primeiro de Agosto (5th title)
- Runner-up: (Angola) Petro Atlético
- Third place: (Egypt) Al Ahly
- Fourth place: (Republic of the Congo) AS Otohô

Tournament statistics
- Matches played: 22
- Goals scored: 1,041 (47.32 per match)

The 2024 Women's African Club Cup Winners Championship is the 40th edition of the African Women's Handball Cup Winners' Cup, organized by the African Handball Confederation, under the auspices of the International Handball Federation, the handball sport governing body. The tournament will be held from the 18 to 27 April 2024 in Oran, Algeria.

== Teams ==
Height teams take part to the tournament.

Participating teams
(Algeria) CF Bourmerdes	(Algeria) HBC El Biar	(Angola) Petro Atlético	(Angola) Primeiro de Agosto
(Republic of the Congo) AS Otohô	(Republic of the Congo) DGSP	(Egypt) Al Ahly	(Ivory Coast) Abidjan HBC

== Venues ==
Cities	Venues	Capacity
Bir El Djir (Oran east)	Miloud Hadefi Complex Omnisport Arena	7,000
Mdina Jdida (Oran center)	Hamou Boutlélis Sports Palace	5,000

== Preliminary rounds ==
=== Group A ===
Pos	Team	Pld	W	D	L	GF	GA	GD	Pts	Qualification
1	(Angola) Primeiro de Agosto	3	3	0	0	86	57	+29	6	Knockout stage
2	(Egypt) Al Ahly	3	2	0	1	78	65	+13	4	Knockout stage
3	(Republic of the Congo) DGSP	3	1	0	2	59	72	−13	2	Knockout stage
4	(Algeria) HBC El Biar	3	0	0	3	55	84	−29	0	Knockout stage

Rules for classification: 1) points; 2) head-to-head points; 3) head-to-head goal difference; 4) head-to-head number of goals scored; 5) goal difference.

18 April 2024; 14:00 WAT (UTC+1)	DGSP (Republic of the Congo)	21–26	(Egypt) Al Ahly	Miloud Hadefi Complex Omnisport Arena, Oran
18 April 2024; 14:00 WAT (UTC+1)		(8–15)		Miloud Hadefi Complex Omnisport Arena, Oran

18 April 2024; 16:00 WAT (UTC+1)	Primeiro de Agosto (Angola)	32–19	(Algeria) HBC El Biar	Hamou Boutlélis Sports Palace, Oran
18 April 2024; 16:00 WAT (UTC+1)		(19–12)		Hamou Boutlélis Sports Palace, Oran

20 April 2024; 16:00 WAT (UTC+1)	Al Ahly (Egypt)	23–27	(Angola) Primeiro de Agosto	Hamou Boutlélis Sports Palace, Oran
20 April 2024; 16:00 WAT (UTC+1)		(11–13)		Hamou Boutlélis Sports Palace, Oran

20 April 2024; 16:00 WAT (UTC+1)	HBC El Biar (Algeria)	19–23	(Republic of the Congo) DGSP	Miloud Hadefi Complex Omnisport Arena, Oran
20 April 2024; 16:00 WAT (UTC+1)		(10–11)		Miloud Hadefi Complex Omnisport Arena, Oran

22 April 2024; 14:00 WAT (UTC+1)	Primeiro de Agosto (Angola)	27–15	(Republic of the Congo) DGSP	Hamou Boutlélis Sports Palace, Oran
22 April 2024; 14:00 WAT (UTC+1)		(14–6)		Hamou Boutlélis Sports Palace, Oran

22 April 2024; 16:00 WAT (UTC+1)	Al Ahly (Egypt)	29–17	(Algeria) HBC El Biar	Hamou Boutlélis Sports Palace, Oran
22 April 2024; 16:00 WAT (UTC+1)		(13–7)		Hamou Boutlélis Sports Palace, Oran

=== Group B ===
Pos	Team	Pld	W	D	L	GF	GA	GD	Pts	Qualification
1	(Angola) Petro Atlético	3	3	0	0	92	65	+27	6	Knockout stage
2	(Republic of the Congo) AS Otohô	3	2	0	1	63	74	−11	4	Knockout stage
3	(Ivory Coast) Abidjan HBC	3	0	1	2	81	85	−4	1	Knockout stage
4	(Algeria) CF Bourmerdes	3	0	1	2	74	86	−12	1	Knockout stage

Rules for classification: 1) points; 2) head-to-head points; 3) head-to-head goal difference; 4) head-to-head number of goals scored; 5) goal difference.

18 April 2024; 12:00 WAT (UTC+1)	AS Otohô (Republic of the Congo)	24–23	(Ivory Coast) Abidjan HBC	Miloud Hadefi Complex Omnisport Arena, Oran; Attendance: 500; Referees: Y. El Saied, H. El Saied (EGY)
18 April 2024; 12:00 WAT (UTC+1)	Domingos 7	(10–18)	Traoré 6	Miloud Hadefi Complex Omnisport Arena, Oran; Attendance: 500; Referees: Y. El Saied, H. El Saied (EGY)
18 April 2024; 12:00 WAT (UTC+1)	5× (suspension)	Report	1× (yellow card) 4× (suspension)	Miloud Hadefi Complex Omnisport Arena, Oran; Attendance: 500; Referees: Y. El Saied, H. El Saied (EGY)

18 April 2024; 12:00 WAT (UTC+1)	Petro Atlético (Angola)	31–23	(Algeria) CF Bourmerdes	Hamou Boutlélis Sports Palace, Oran
18 April 2024; 12:00 WAT (UTC+1)		(17–14)		Hamou Boutlélis Sports Palace, Oran

20 April 2024; 14:00 WAT (UTC+1)	Abidjan HBC (Ivory Coast)	29–32	(Angola) Petro Atlético	Miloud Hadefi Complex Omnisport Arena, Oran
20 April 2024; 14:00 WAT (UTC+1)		(12–20)		Miloud Hadefi Complex Omnisport Arena, Oran

20 April 2024; 20:00 WAT (UTC+1)	CF Bourmerdes (Algeria)	22–26	(Republic of the Congo) AS Otohô	Miloud Hadefi Complex Omnisport Arena, Oran
20 April 2024; 20:00 WAT (UTC+1)		(11–13)		Miloud Hadefi Complex Omnisport Arena, Oran

22 April 2024; 18:00 WAT (UTC+1)	Petro Atlético (Angola)	29–13	(Republic of the Congo) AS Otohô	Miloud Hadefi Complex Omnisport Arena, Oran; Attendance: 500; Referees: Awedni, Zribi (TUN)
22 April 2024; 18:00 WAT (UTC+1)	Nenganga 9	(16–7)	Touba 3	Miloud Hadefi Complex Omnisport Arena, Oran; Attendance: 500; Referees: Awedni, Zribi (TUN)
22 April 2024; 18:00 WAT (UTC+1)	1× (suspension)	Report	3× (suspension)	Miloud Hadefi Complex Omnisport Arena, Oran; Attendance: 500; Referees: Awedni, Zribi (TUN)

22 April 2024; 18:00 WAT (UTC+1)	Abidjan HBC (Ivory Coast)	29–29	(Algeria) CF Bourmerdes	Hamou Boutlélis Sports Palace, Oran
22 April 2024; 18:00 WAT (UTC+1)		(18–16)		Hamou Boutlélis Sports Palace, Oran

== Knockout stage ==
Championship bracket

Quarter-finals
23 Apr 2024 – 14:00
(Angola) Primeiro de Agosto	33
(Algeria) CF Bourmerdes	22
23 Apr 2024 – 18:00
(Republic of the Congo) AS Otohô	17
(Republic of the Congo) DGSP	16
23 Apr 2024 – 14:00
(Angola) Petro Atlético	25
(Algeria) HBC El Biar	22
23 Apr 2024 – 18:00
(Egypt) Al Ahly	28
(Ivory Coast) Abidjan HBC	16

Semi-finals
25 Apr 2024 – 18:00
(Angola) Primeiro de Agosto	31
(Republic of the Congo) AS Otohô	11
25 Apr 2024 – 16:30
(Angola) Petro Atlético	24
(Egypt) Al Ahly	19

Final
27 Apr 2024 – 16:00
(Angola) Primeiro de Agosto (ET)	23
(Angola) Petro Atlético	22
Third place
27 Apr 2024 – 12:00
(Republic of the Congo) AS Otohô	20
(Egypt) Al Ahly	23

=== Quarter-finals ===
23 April 2024; 14:00 WAT (UTC+1)	Primeiro de Agosto (Angola)	33–22	(Algeria) CF Bourmerdes	Miloud Hadefi Complex Omnisport Arena, Oran; Attendance: 500; Referees: Koné, Yapo (CIV)
23 April 2024; 14:00 WAT (UTC+1)	Belo 7	(17–10)	Ammari 5	Miloud Hadefi Complex Omnisport Arena, Oran; Attendance: 500; Referees: Koné, Yapo (CIV)
23 April 2024; 14:00 WAT (UTC+1)	3× (suspension)	Report	2× (suspension)	Miloud Hadefi Complex Omnisport Arena, Oran; Attendance: 500; Referees: Koné, Yapo (CIV)

23 April 2024; 18:00 WAT (UTC+1)	AS Otohô (Republic of the Congo)	17–16	(Republic of the Congo) DGSP	Hamou Boutlélis Sports Palace, Oran; Attendance: 500
23 April 2024; 18:00 WAT (UTC+1)	Mbunga 5	(9–7)	Nnomo 5	Hamou Boutlélis Sports Palace, Oran; Attendance: 500
23 April 2024; 18:00 WAT (UTC+1)	6× (suspension)	Report	3× (suspension)	Hamou Boutlélis Sports Palace, Oran; Attendance: 500

23 April 2024; 14:00 WAT (UTC+1)	Petro Atlético (Angola)	25–22	(Algeria) HBC El Biar	Hamou Boutlélis Sports Palace, Oran; Attendance: 500; Referees: Fofana, Youla (GUI)
23 April 2024; 14:00 WAT (UTC+1)	Nenganga 7	(12–12)	Masri 6	Hamou Boutlélis Sports Palace, Oran; Attendance: 500; Referees: Fofana, Youla (GUI)
23 April 2024; 14:00 WAT (UTC+1)	3× (suspension)	Report	1× (yellow card) 4× (suspension)	Hamou Boutlélis Sports Palace, Oran; Attendance: 500; Referees: Fofana, Youla (GUI)

23 April 2024; 18:00 WAT (UTC+1)	Al Ahly (Egypt)	28–16	(Ivory Coast) Abidjan HBC	Miloud Hadefi Complex Omnisport Arena, Oran; Attendance: 500; Referees: Hamidi, Belkhiri (ALG)
23 April 2024; 18:00 WAT (UTC+1)	Ahmed 6	(13–11)	Traoré 6	Miloud Hadefi Complex Omnisport Arena, Oran; Attendance: 500; Referees: Hamidi, Belkhiri (ALG)
23 April 2024; 18:00 WAT (UTC+1)	3× (suspension)	Report	4× (suspension)	Miloud Hadefi Complex Omnisport Arena, Oran; Attendance: 500; Referees: Hamidi, Belkhiri (ALG)

=== Semi-finals ===
25 April 2024; 18:00 WAT (UTC+1)	Primeiro de Agosto (Angola)	31–11	(Republic of the Congo) AS Otohô	Hamou Boutlélis Sports Palace, Oran; Attendance: 500
25 April 2024; 18:00 WAT (UTC+1)	five players 4	(17–5)	Olikaka, Domingos, Koah 2	Hamou Boutlélis Sports Palace, Oran; Attendance: 500
25 April 2024; 18:00 WAT (UTC+1)	1× (suspension)	Report	2× (suspension)	Hamou Boutlélis Sports Palace, Oran; Attendance: 500

25 April 2024; 16:30 WAT (UTC+1)	Petro Atlético (Angola)	24–19	(Egypt) Al Ahly	Miloud Hadefi Complex Omnisport Arena, Oran; Attendance: 500; Referees: Ghoul, Chergui (ALG)
25 April 2024; 16:30 WAT (UTC+1)	Venancio 10	(12–11)	Molkova 7	Miloud Hadefi Complex Omnisport Arena, Oran; Attendance: 500; Referees: Ghoul, Chergui (ALG)
25 April 2024; 16:30 WAT (UTC+1)	4× (suspension)	Report		Miloud Hadefi Complex Omnisport Arena, Oran; Attendance: 500; Referees: Ghoul, Chergui (ALG)

=== Third place match ===
27 April 2024; 12:00 WAT (UTC+1)	AS Otohô (Republic of the Congo)	20–23	(Egypt) Al Ahly	Miloud Hadefi Complex Omnisport Arena, Oran; Attendance: 500; Referees: Faye, Fadel (SEN)
27 April 2024; 12:00 WAT (UTC+1)	Touba 6	(10–12)	Ahmed 5	Miloud Hadefi Complex Omnisport Arena, Oran; Attendance: 500; Referees: Faye, Fadel (SEN)
27 April 2024; 12:00 WAT (UTC+1)	4× (suspension)	Report		Miloud Hadefi Complex Omnisport Arena, Oran; Attendance: 500; Referees: Faye, Fadel (SEN)

=== Final ===
27 April 2024
16:00 WAT (UTC+1)
Primeiro de Agosto (Angola)
23–22 (ET)
(Angola) Petro Atlético
Miloud Hadefi Complex Omnisport Arena, Oran
Attendance: 500
Referees: Y. El Saied, H. El Saied (EGY)
Machado 6
(5–10)
Nenganga 10
1× (yellow card) 5× (suspension) 1× (red card)
Report
4× (suspension)

FT: 19–19 ET: 4–3

== Classification play-offs ==
=== 5–8th place matches ===
24 April 2024; 16:00 WAT (UTC+1)	CF Bourmerdes (Algeria)	21–30	(Republic of the Congo) DGSP	Miloud Hadefi Complex Omnisport Arena, Oran; Attendance: 500; Referees: S. Haggui, R. Haggui (TUN)
24 April 2024; 16:00 WAT (UTC+1)	Ammari 6	(7–19)	Monteiro 11	Miloud Hadefi Complex Omnisport Arena, Oran; Attendance: 500; Referees: S. Haggui, R. Haggui (TUN)
24 April 2024; 16:00 WAT (UTC+1)	2× (suspension)	Report	2× (suspension)	Miloud Hadefi Complex Omnisport Arena, Oran; Attendance: 500; Referees: S. Haggui, R. Haggui (TUN)

24 April 2024; 16:00 WAT (UTC+1)	HBC El Biar (Algeria)	32–18	(Ivory Coast) Abidjan HBC	Hamou Boutlélis Sports Palace, Oran; Attendance: 500
24 April 2024; 16:00 WAT (UTC+1)	Yelles 9	(12–9)	Traoré, Bakayoko 3	Hamou Boutlélis Sports Palace, Oran; Attendance: 500
24 April 2024; 16:00 WAT (UTC+1)	1× (suspension)	Report	4× (suspension) 1× (red card)	Hamou Boutlélis Sports Palace, Oran; Attendance: 500

== Final standings ==
Rank	Team
Gold medal	(Angola) Primeiro de Agosto
Silver medal	(Angola) Petro Atlético
Bronze medal	(Egypt) Al Ahly SC
4	(Republic of the Congo) AS Otohô
5	(Republic of the Congo) DGSP
6	(Algeria) HBC El Biar
7	(Ivory Coast) Abidjan HBC
8	(Algeria) CF Bourmerdes
