= 2014 Oceania Handball Champions Cup =

The 2014 Oceania Handball Champions Cup was held in Noumea from 18 to 21 June 2014. This was organised by the Oceania Handball Federation and featured teams from Australia and host's New Caledonia.

The tournament was won by Australian team Sydney University. They won the right to represent Oceania in the 2014 IHF Super Globe.

== Results ==
=== Round Robin Stage ===
18 June 2014	(New Caledonia) AS Dumbea	26– 44	(Australia) St Kilda HC

18 June 2014	(New Caledonia) ACB Poya	14 – 35	(Australia) Sydney University

19 June 2014	(Australia) Sydney University	22 – 21	(Australia) St Kilda HC

19 June 2014	(New Caledonia) ACB Poya	unknown	(New Caledonia) AS Dumbea

20 June 2014	(New Caledonia) ACB Poya	39 – 15	(Australia) St Kilda HC

20 June 2014	(Australia) Sydney University	41 - 23	(New Caledonia) AS Dumbea

=== 3rd-place play-off ===
21 June 2014	(New Caledonia) ACB Poya	33 - 32	(New Caledonia) AS Dumbea

=== Final ===
21 June 2014	(Australia) Sydney University	24 - 23	(Australia) St Kilda HC

== Final standings ==
Classification
1st place, gold medalist(s)	(Australia) Sydney University
2nd place, silver medalist(s)	(Australia) Saint Kilda Handball Club
3rd place, bronze medalist(s)	(New Caledonia) ACB Poya
4	(New Caledonia) AS Dumbea
