= 2024 African Handball Super Cup =

2024 كأس إفريقيا الممتازة لكرة اليد

Tournament details
- Host country: Algeria
- Venue(s): 1 (in 1 host city)
- Dates: 15–16 April
- Teams: 8 (4 men & 4 women) (from 1 confederation)

Final positions
- Champions: M: (Egypt) Al Ahly; W: (Angola) Primeiro de Agosto
- Runner-up: M: (Egypt) Zamalek; W: (Angola) Petro Atlético

Tournament statistics
- Matches played: 8
- Goals scored: 446 (55.75 per match)

The 2024 African Handball Super Cup (men and women), officially 31st Men's and Women's Super Cup Final Four is the 31st edition of the African Handball Super Cup, it is a handball competition organized by the African Handball Confederation, under the auspices of the International Handball Federation, the handball sport governing body. The matches, held from 15 to 16 April 2024 at the Miloud Hadefi Complex Omnisport Arena, in Oran, Algeria, and is contested by the finalists of the 2023 African Handball Champions League and of the 2023 African Handball Cup Winners' Cup for the man and also the finalists of the 2023 African Women's Handball Champions League and of the 2023 African Women's Handball Cup Winners' Cup for the women. For the first time, four teams for men and also for women participated to the tournament. The winners of the men's tournament will participate to the 2024 IHF Men's Super Globe.

== Participating teams ==
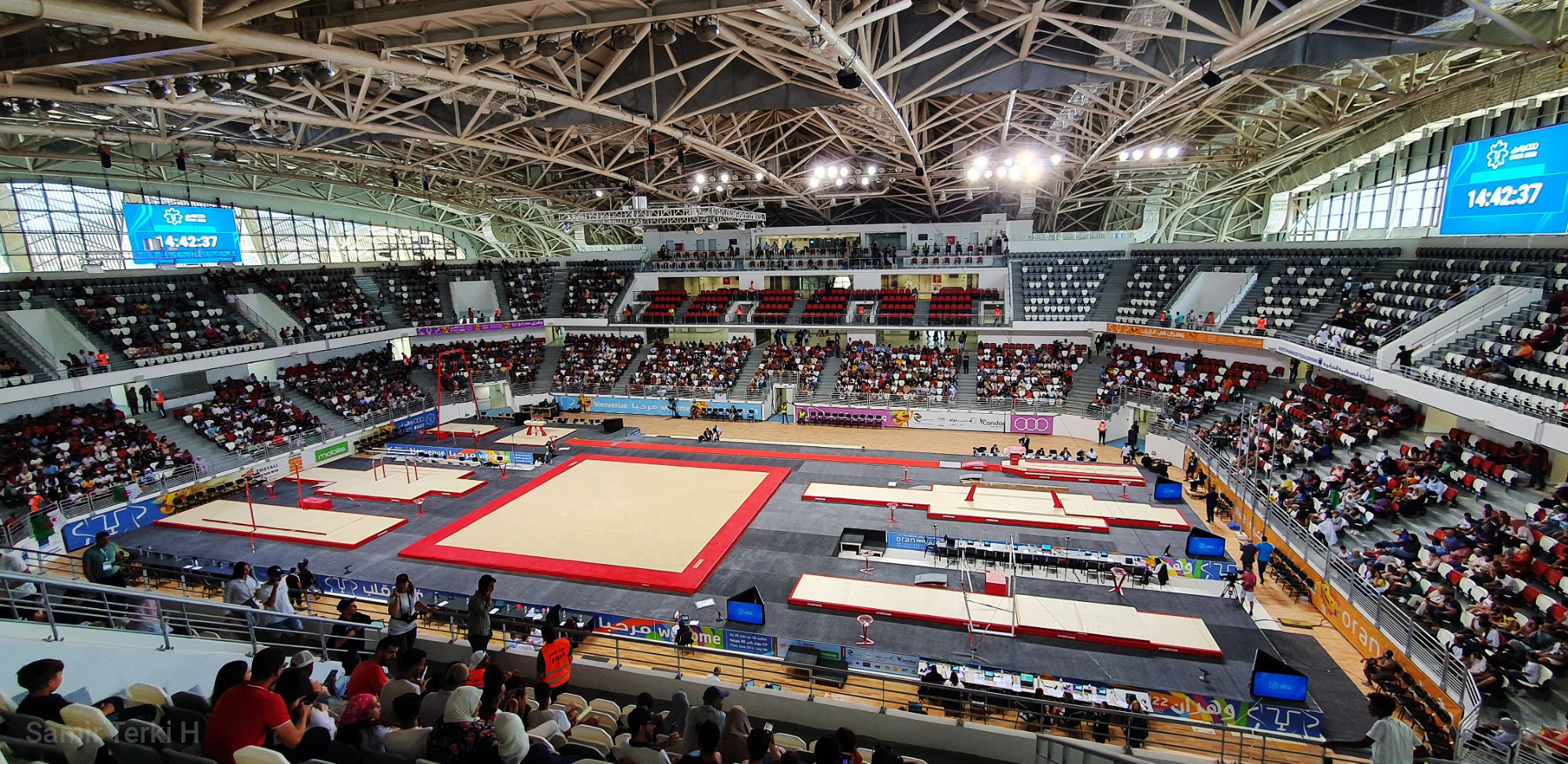
The Miloud Hadefi Complex Omnisport Arena

=== For men ===
BMC of Congo replaced Alexandria Sporting Club who had forfeited the tournament.

| Team | Qualification | Previous participation (bold indicates winners) |
|---|---|---|
| (Egypt) Al Ahly | 2023 African Handball Champions League winners | 8 (2013, 2014, **2017**, 2018, 2019, 2021, **2022**, **2023**) |
| (Democratic Republic of the Congo) JS Kinshasa | 2023 African Handball Champions League runners-up | None |
| (Egypt) Zamalek | 2023 African Men's Handball Cup Winners' Cup winners | 11 (**2002**, **2010**, **2011**, **2012**, 2016, 2017, **2018**, **2019**, **2021**, 2022, 2023) |
| (Republic of the Congo) BMC | 2023 African Handball Champions League third place | None |

=== For women ===
DGSP and Al Ahly were chosen because the two Angolan teams Primeiro de Agosto and Petro Atlético were the finalists of both African Women's Handball Champions League and African Women's Handball Cup Winners' Cup.

| Team | Qualification | Previous participation (bold indicates winners) |
|---|---|---|
| (Angola) Primeiro de Agosto | 2023 African Women's Handball Champions League winners | 7 (**2015**, **2016**, **2017**, **2018**, **2019**, **2021**, 2023) |
| (Angola) Petro Atlético | 2023 African Women's Handball Champions League runners-up | 23 (**1994**, 1995, **1996**, **1998**, **1999**, **2000**, **2001**, **2002**, **2003**, **2005**, **2006**, **2007**, **2008**, **2009**, **2010**, **2011**, **2012**, **2013**, **2014**, 2015, 2019, 2021, **2023**) |
| (Republic of the Congo) DGSP | 2023 African Women's Handball Champions League third place | None |
| (Egypt) Al Ahly | 2023 African Women's Handball Cup Winners' Cup third place | None |

== 2024 Africa Men's Handball Super Cup ==
=== Semifinals ===
| 15 April 2024; 13:30 WAT (UTC+1) | Zamalek (Egypt) | 41–29 | (Democratic Republic of the Congo) JS Kinshasa | Miloud Hadefi Complex Omnisport Arena, Oran; Attendance: 500; Referees: Koné, Yapo (CIV) |
| 15 April 2024; 13:30 WAT (UTC+1) | Saad 10 | (21–13) | Lombé, Notsan 9 | Miloud Hadefi Complex Omnisport Arena, Oran; Attendance: 500; Referees: Koné, Yapo (CIV) |
| 15 April 2024; 13:30 WAT (UTC+1) | 1× (suspension) | Report | 1× (suspension) | Miloud Hadefi Complex Omnisport Arena, Oran; Attendance: 500; Referees: Koné, Yapo (CIV) |

| 15 April 2024; 18:30 WAT (UTC+1) | Al Ahly (Egypt) | 38–21 | (Republic of the Congo) BMC | Miloud Hadefi Complex Omnisport Arena, Oran |
| 15 April 2024; 18:30 WAT (UTC+1) | | (17–9) | | Miloud Hadefi Complex Omnisport Arena, Oran |

=== 3–4th places ===
| 16 April 2024; 14:30 WAT (UTC+1) | JS Kinshasa (Democratic Republic of the Congo) | 21–38 | (Republic of the Congo) BMC | Miloud Hadefi Complex Omnisport Arena, Oran; Attendance: 500; Referees: Chergui, Ghoul (ALG) |
| 16 April 2024; 14:30 WAT (UTC+1) | Notsan 9 | (10–19) | Adjeng, Malonga 7 | Miloud Hadefi Complex Omnisport Arena, Oran; Attendance: 500; Referees: Chergui, Ghoul (ALG) |
| 16 April 2024; 14:30 WAT (UTC+1) | 5× (suspension) 1× (red card) | Report | 3× (suspension) | Miloud Hadefi Complex Omnisport Arena, Oran; Attendance: 500; Referees: Chergui, Ghoul (ALG) |

=== Final ===
| 16 April 2024; 18:30 WAT (UTC+1) | Zamalek (Egypt) | 21–23 | (Egypt) Al Ahly | Miloud Hadefi Complex Omnisport Arena, Oran; Attendance: 1,000; Referees: Hamidi, Belkhiri (ALG) |
| 16 April 2024; 18:30 WAT (UTC+1) | El-Wakil 7 | (10–10) | Abdou 6 | Miloud Hadefi Complex Omnisport Arena, Oran; Attendance: 1,000; Referees: Hamidi, Belkhiri (ALG) |
| 16 April 2024; 18:30 WAT (UTC+1) | 1× (yellow card) 5× (suspension) 1× (red card) | Report | 6× (suspension) | Miloud Hadefi Complex Omnisport Arena, Oran; Attendance: 1,000; Referees: Hamidi, Belkhiri (ALG) |

== 2024 Africa Women's Handball Super Cup ==
=== Semifinals ===
| 15 April 2024; 11:00 WAT (UTC+1) | Primeiro de Agosto (Angola) | 33–24 | (Republic of the Congo) DGSP | Miloud Hadefi Complex Omnisport Arena, Oran; Attendance: 1,000; Referees: S. Haggui, R. Haggui (TUN) |
| 15 April 2024; 11:00 WAT (UTC+1) | Machado, Belinha 5 | (18–12) | Monteiro 7 | Miloud Hadefi Complex Omnisport Arena, Oran; Attendance: 1,000; Referees: S. Haggui, R. Haggui (TUN) |
| 15 April 2024; 11:00 WAT (UTC+1) | 2× (suspension) | Report | 5× (suspension) | Miloud Hadefi Complex Omnisport Arena, Oran; Attendance: 1,000; Referees: S. Haggui, R. Haggui (TUN) |

| 15 April 2024; 16:00 WAT (UTC+1) | Petro Atlético (Angola) | 26–23 | (Egypt) Al Ahly | Miloud Hadefi Complex Omnisport Arena, Oran; Attendance: 500; Referees: Hamidi, Belkhiri (ALG) |
| 15 April 2024; 16:00 WAT (UTC+1) | Nenganga 8 | (13–14) | Molkova 5 | Miloud Hadefi Complex Omnisport Arena, Oran; Attendance: 500; Referees: Hamidi, Belkhiri (ALG) |
| 15 April 2024; 16:00 WAT (UTC+1) | 3× (suspension) | Report | 2× (yellow card) 2× (suspension) | Miloud Hadefi Complex Omnisport Arena, Oran; Attendance: 500; Referees: Hamidi, Belkhiri (ALG) |

=== 3–4th places ===
| 16 April 2024; 12:00 WAT (UTC+1) | DGSP (Republic of the Congo) | 20–29 | (Egypt) Al Ahly | Miloud Hadefi Complex Omnisport Arena, Oran; Attendance: 500; Referees: Faye, Fadel (SEN) |
| 16 April 2024; 12:00 WAT (UTC+1) | Monteiro, Momboly 7 | (11–14) | Salama, Zaki 6 | Miloud Hadefi Complex Omnisport Arena, Oran; Attendance: 500; Referees: Faye, Fadel (SEN) |
| 16 April 2024; 12:00 WAT (UTC+1) | 3× (suspension) | Report | | Miloud Hadefi Complex Omnisport Arena, Oran; Attendance: 500; Referees: Faye, Fadel (SEN) |

=== Final ===
| 16 April 2024; 16:00 WAT (UTC+1) | Primeiro de Agosto (Angola) | 31–28 | (Angola) Petro Atlético | Miloud Hadefi Complex Omnisport Arena, Oran; Attendance: 500; Referees: Hamdy, Mahmoud (EGY) |
| 16 April 2024; 16:00 WAT (UTC+1) | Machado, Mario 6 | (13–13) | Nenganga 12 | Miloud Hadefi Complex Omnisport Arena, Oran; Attendance: 500; Referees: Hamdy, Mahmoud (EGY) |
| 16 April 2024; 16:00 WAT (UTC+1) | 2× (suspension) | Report | 1× (suspension) | Miloud Hadefi Complex Omnisport Arena, Oran; Attendance: 500; Referees: Hamdy, Mahmoud (EGY) |

== See also ==
- 2023 African Handball Champions League
- 2023 African Women's Handball Champions League
- 2023 African Men's Handball Cup Winners' Cup
- 2023 African Women's Handball Cup Winners' Cup
