= Tahitian Handball League =

The Tahitian Handball League is a European handball competition held in Tahiti. Handball is a very popular sport in French Polynesia as the roots of the sport are European. The winner and runner-up of this tournament qualify for the Oceania Handball Champions Cup.

== Champions ==
Year	Men's	Women's
1990	Central HC	AS Dragon
1991	AS Dragon	AS Dragon
1992	Excelsior	Excelsior
1993	Central HC	AS Dragon
1994	Central HC	AS Dragon
1995	AS Dragon	AS Dragon
1996	AS Dragon	AS Dragon
1997	Central HC	Excelsior
1998	Central HC	Excelsior
1999	AS Faa'a	AS Dragon
2000	AS Dragon	AS Dragon
2001	Central HC	Central HC
2002	AS Faa'a	Central HC
2003	Excelsior	Excelsior
2004	Excelsior	AS Dragon
2005	AS Faa'a	Excelsior
2006	AS Dragon	AS Dragon
2007	AS Dragon	AS Dragon
2008	AS Faa'a	unknown
2009	AS Faa'a	unknown
2010	AS Faa'a	unknown
2011	AS Faa'a	unknown
2012	AS Faa'a	unknown
2013	AS Faa'a	AS Faa'a
2014	AS Dragon	AS Faa'a
2015	Excelsior	AS Dragon
2016	unknown	AS Faa'a
