= 2017 Oceania Women's Handball Champions Cup =

The 2017 Oceania Women's Handball Champions Cup was the first since 2010 and first ever held in Australia. It was held at Geelong, Victoria and was held in conjunction with the 2017 Australian Handball Club Championship.

The event saw seven teams from three nations. The eventual winner was AS Dumbea from New Caledonia. They were runners up in the 2010 championship and this was their first win. Runners up were 2016 Australian Champions and co-hosts Melbourne HC. Third place was Australian side University of Technology Sydney who beat Auckland in the play off. Fifth were co-hosts Deakin/Southside, then New Zealand team Canterbury Quakes and Sydney University seventh.

== Results ==
=== Round Robin - Pool A ===
Team	Pld	W	D	L	GF	GA	GD	Pts
(New Caledonia) AS Dumbea	3	2	1	0	107	65	+42	5
(Australia) Melbourne HC	3	1	2	0	55	39	+16	4
(New Zealand) Canterbury Quakes	3	1	1	1	50	69	−19	3
(Australia) Sydney University	3	0	0	3	66	105	−39	0

11 May 2017	(Australia) Sydney University	18 - 34	(Australia) Melbourne HC	Corio Leisuretime Center, Geelong - Court 2

11 May 2017	(Australia) Sydney University	26 - 28	(New Zealand) Canterbury Quakes	Corio Leisuretime Center, Geelong - Court 1

11 May 2017	(Australia) Melbourne HC	21 - 21	(New Caledonia) AS Dumbea	Corio Leisuretime Center, Geelong - Court 1

12 May 2017	(New Caledonia) AS Dumbea	43 - 22	(New Zealand) Canterbury Quakes	Corio Leisuretime Center, Geelong - Court 1

12 May 2017	(Australia) Sydney University	22 - 43	(New Caledonia) AS Dumbea	Corio Leisuretime Center, Geelong - Court 1

12 May 2017; 15:40	(Australia) Melbourne HC	cancelled	(New Zealand) Canterbury Quakes	Corio Leisuretime Center, Geelong - Court 1

=== Round Robin - Pool B ===
Team	Pld	W	D	L	GF	GA	GD	Pts
(Australia) University of Technology Sydney	2	2	0	0	42	25	+17	4
(New Zealand) Auckland Region	2	1	0	1	34	32	+2	2
(Australia) Deakin/Southside	2	0	0	2	26	45	−19	0

11 May 2017	(New Zealand) Auckland Region	23 - 12	(Australia) Deakin/Southside	Corio Leisuretime Center, Geelong - Court 1

11 May 2017	(Australia) University of Technology Sydney	20 - 11	(New Zealand) Auckland Region	Corio Leisuretime Center, Geelong - Court 2

12 May 2017	(Australia) University of Technology Sydney	22 - 14	(Australia) Deakin/Southside	Corio Leisuretime Center, Geelong - Court 1

=== Grading 5th - 7th place ===
Team	Pld	W	D	L	GF	GA	GD	Pts
(Australia) Deakin/Southside	2	2	0	0	52	42	+10	4
(New Zealand) Canterbury Quakes	2	1	0	1	49	52	−3	2
(Australia) Sydney University	2	0	0	2	47	54	−7	0

11 May 2017	(Australia) Sydney University	26 - 28	(New Zealand) Canterbury Quakes	Corio Leisuretime Center, Geelong - Court 1

13 May 2017	(Australia) Sydney University	21 - 26	(Australia) Deakin/Southside	Corio Leisuretime Center, Geelong - Court 1

14 May 2017	(New Zealand) Canterbury Quakes	21 - 26	(Australia) Deakin/Southside	Corio Leisuretime Center, Geelong - Court 2

=== Semi-finals ===
13 May 2017	(New Zealand) Auckland Region	17 - 32	(New Caledonia) AS Dumbea	Corio Leisuretime Center, Geelong - Court 1

14 May 2017	(Australia) Melbourne HC	23 - 16	(Australia) University of Technology Sydney	Corio Leisuretime Center, Geelong - Court 1

=== Third place play-off ===
14 May 2017	(New Zealand) Auckland Region	20 - 24	(Australia) University of Technology Sydney	Corio Leisuretime Center, Geelong - Court 1

=== Grand Final ===
14 May 2017	(New Caledonia) AS Dumbea	27 - 26	(Australia) Melbourne HC	Corio Leisuretime Center, Geelong - Court 1

== Rankings ==
Classification
1st place, gold medalist(s)	(New Caledonia) AS Dumbea
2nd place, silver medalist(s)	(Australia) Melbourne HC
3rd place, bronze medalist(s)	(Australia) University of Technology Sydney
4	(New Zealand) Auckland Region
5	(Australia) Deakin/Southside
6	(New Zealand) Canterbury Quakes
7	(Australia) Sydney University
