= 2014 IHF Super Globe =

Tournament details
- Host country: Qatar
- Venue(s): 1 (in 1 host city)
- Dates: 7–12 September
- Teams: 8 (from 5 confederations)

Final positions
- Champions: (Spain) FC Barcelona (2nd title)
- Runner-up: (Qatar) Al Sadd
- Third place: (Germany) Flensburg-Handewitt
- Fourth place: (Qatar) El Jaish

Tournament statistics
- Matches played: 20
- Goals scored: 1,091 (54.55 per match)
- Attendance: 23,900 (1,195 per match)
- Top scorer(s): (Cuba) Jorge Paván (38 goals)

The 2014 IHF Super Globe was the eighth edition. It was held in Doha, Qatar, at the Al-Gharafa Sports Club Hall from 7 to 12 September 2014.

FC Barcelona won the title for the second consecutive time by defeating Al Sadd 34–26 in the final.

== Teams ==
The teams that were taking part were the respectives continental champions:

Team	Qualified as
(Spain) FC Barcelona	Defending champion
(Tunisia) Espérance Tunis	Winner of African Champions League
(Qatar) El Jaish	Winner of Asian Men's Club League Handball Championship
(Australia) Sydney University	Winner of Oceania Champions Cup
(Brazil) HC Taubaté	Winner of Pan American Club Championship
(Germany) SG Flensburg-Handewitt	Winner of EHF Champions League
(Qatar) Al Sadd	Host
(Qatar) Al Ahli	Wildcard

== Draw ==
=== Seedings ===
The seedings were announced on 18 June with the draw being held at 19 June.

Pot 1	Pot 2	Pot 3	Pot 4
(Spain) FC Barcelona (Germany) SG Flensburg-Handewitt	(Qatar) El Jaish (Tunisia) Espérance Tunis	(Qatar) Al Sadd (Brazil) HC Taubaté	(Qatar) Al Ahli (Australia) Sydney University

== Preliminary round ==
Legend
Qualified for the semifinals

All times are local (UTC+3).

=== Group A ===
Team	Pld	W	D	L	GF	GA	GD	Pts
(Germany) SG Flensburg-Handewitt	3	3	0	0	86	66	+20	6
(Qatar) El Jaish	3	2	0	1	89	79	+10	4
(Brazil) HC Taubaté	3	1	0	2	78	91	−13	2
(Qatar) Al Ahli	3	0	0	3	69	86	−17	0

7 September 2014; 15:00	Flensburg-Handewitt (Germany)	28–22	(Brazil) HC Taubaté	Al-Gharafa Sports Club Hall, Doha; Attendance: 500; Referees: Gubica, Milošević (CRO)
7 September 2014; 15:00	three players 5	(12–9)	Migueles 5	Al-Gharafa Sports Club Hall, Doha; Attendance: 500; Referees: Gubica, Milošević (CRO)
7 September 2014; 15:00	3× (yellow card) 7× (suspension)	Report	2× (yellow card) 3× (suspension)	Al-Gharafa Sports Club Hall, Doha; Attendance: 500; Referees: Gubica, Milošević (CRO)

7 September 2014; 17:00	El Jaish (Qatar)	28–23	(Qatar) Al Ahli	Al-Gharafa Sports Club Hall, Doha; Attendance: 2,500; Referees: Rashed, El-Sayed (EGY)
7 September 2014; 17:00	El-Ahmar 9	(10–10)	Paván 10	Al-Gharafa Sports Club Hall, Doha; Attendance: 2,500; Referees: Rashed, El-Sayed (EGY)
7 September 2014; 17:00	3× (yellow card) 5× (suspension) 2× (red card)	Report	3× (yellow card) 2× (suspension)	Al-Gharafa Sports Club Hall, Doha; Attendance: 2,500; Referees: Rashed, El-Sayed (EGY)

8 September 2014; 16:00	HC Taubaté (Brazil)	27–37	(Qatar) El Jaish	Al-Gharafa Sports Club Hall, Doha; Attendance: 1,000; Referees: Lee, Koo (KOR)
8 September 2014; 16:00	three players 6	(14–15)	El-Ahmar 9	Al-Gharafa Sports Club Hall, Doha; Attendance: 1,000; Referees: Lee, Koo (KOR)
8 September 2014; 16:00	3× (yellow card) 5× (suspension)	Report	3× (yellow card) 2× (suspension)	Al-Gharafa Sports Club Hall, Doha; Attendance: 1,000; Referees: Lee, Koo (KOR)

8 September 2014; 20:00	Al Ahli (Qatar)	20–29	(Germany) Flensburg-Handewitt	Al-Gharafa Sports Club Hall, Doha; Attendance: 900; Referees: Kliko, Johansson (SWE)
8 September 2014; 20:00	Paván 8	(13–13)	Blohme, Kaufmann 5	Al-Gharafa Sports Club Hall, Doha; Attendance: 900; Referees: Kliko, Johansson (SWE)
8 September 2014; 20:00	3× (yellow card) 4× (suspension)	Report	3× (yellow card) 3× (suspension)	Al-Gharafa Sports Club Hall, Doha; Attendance: 900; Referees: Kliko, Johansson (SWE)

9 September 2014; 16:00	Flensburg-Handewitt (Germany)	29–24	(Qatar) El Jaish	Al-Gharafa Sports Club Hall, Doha; Attendance: 1,500; Referees: Nachevski, Nikolov (MKD)
9 September 2014; 16:00	Eggert 10	(16–13)	Marković 8	Al-Gharafa Sports Club Hall, Doha; Attendance: 1,500; Referees: Nachevski, Nikolov (MKD)
9 September 2014; 16:00	4× (yellow card) 4× (suspension)	Report	4× (yellow card) 4× (suspension)	Al-Gharafa Sports Club Hall, Doha; Attendance: 1,500; Referees: Nachevski, Nikolov (MKD)

9 September 2014; 18:00	HC Taubaté (Brazil)	29–26	(Qatar) Al Ahli	Al-Gharafa Sports Club Hall, Doha; Attendance: 900; Referees: Gubica, Milošević (CRO)
9 September 2014; 18:00	three players 6	(16–12)	Paván 6	Al-Gharafa Sports Club Hall, Doha; Attendance: 900; Referees: Gubica, Milošević (CRO)
9 September 2014; 18:00	3× (yellow card) 3× (suspension)	Report	3× (yellow card) 4× (suspension)	Al-Gharafa Sports Club Hall, Doha; Attendance: 900; Referees: Gubica, Milošević (CRO)

=== Group B ===
Team	Pld	W	D	L	GF	GA	GD	Pts
(Spain) FC Barcelona	3	3	0	0	105	66	+39	6
(Qatar) Al Sadd	3	2	0	1	87	86	+1	4
(Tunisia) Espérance de Tunis	3	1	0	2	81	87	−6	2
(Australia) Sydney University	3	0	0	3	61	95	−34	0

7 September 2014; 13:00	Espérance de Tunis (Tunisia)	29–20	(Australia) Sydney University	Al-Gharafa Sports Club Hall, Doha; Attendance: 300; Referees: Lee, Koo (KOR)
7 September 2014; 13:00	Mrabet, Yahiaoui 6	(14–5)	Llorrente 4	Al-Gharafa Sports Club Hall, Doha; Attendance: 300; Referees: Lee, Koo (KOR)
7 September 2014; 13:00	4× (yellow card) 5× (suspension)	Report	3× (yellow card) 6× (suspension)	Al-Gharafa Sports Club Hall, Doha; Attendance: 300; Referees: Lee, Koo (KOR)

7 September 2014; 20:15	FC Barcelona (Spain)	34–25	(Qatar) Al Sadd	Al-Gharafa Sports Club Hall, Doha; Attendance: 600; Referees: Nachevski, Nikolov (MKD)
7 September 2014; 20:15	Sigurðsson, Lazarov 6	(17–12)	Bannour, Tomić 5	Al-Gharafa Sports Club Hall, Doha; Attendance: 600; Referees: Nachevski, Nikolov (MKD)
7 September 2014; 20:15	3× (yellow card) 1× (suspension)	Report	3× (yellow card) 3× (suspension)	Al-Gharafa Sports Club Hall, Doha; Attendance: 600; Referees: Nachevski, Nikolov (MKD)

8 September 2014; 14:00	Sydney University (Australia)	18–34	(Spain) FC Barcelona	Al-Gharafa Sports Club Hall, Doha; Attendance: 200; Referees: Rashed, El-Sayed (EGY)
8 September 2014; 14:00	Rui Tupan 6	(12–15)	three players 5	Al-Gharafa Sports Club Hall, Doha; Attendance: 200; Referees: Rashed, El-Sayed (EGY)
8 September 2014; 14:00	3× (yellow card) 5× (suspension)	Report	3× (yellow card) 2× (suspension)	Al-Gharafa Sports Club Hall, Doha; Attendance: 200; Referees: Rashed, El-Sayed (EGY)

8 September 2014; 18:00	Al Sadd (Qatar)	30–29	(Tunisia) Espérance de Tunis	Al-Gharafa Sports Club Hall, Doha; Attendance: 1,500; Referees: Gubica, Milošević (CRO)
8 September 2014; 18:00	Bannour 13	(12–15)	Hamed 6	Al-Gharafa Sports Club Hall, Doha; Attendance: 1,500; Referees: Gubica, Milošević (CRO)
8 September 2014; 18:00	3× (yellow card) 7× (suspension)	Report	4× (yellow card) 12× (suspension)	Al-Gharafa Sports Club Hall, Doha; Attendance: 1,500; Referees: Gubica, Milošević (CRO)

9 September 2014; 14:00	FC Barcelona (Spain)	37–23	(Tunisia) Espérance de Tunis	Al-Gharafa Sports Club Hall, Doha; Attendance: 300; Referees: Kliko, Johansson (SWE)
9 September 2014; 14:00	Tomás 8	(20–10)	Alouini 6	Al-Gharafa Sports Club Hall, Doha; Attendance: 300; Referees: Kliko, Johansson (SWE)
9 September 2014; 14:00	3× (yellow card) 6× (suspension)	Report	3× (yellow card) 7× (suspension)	Al-Gharafa Sports Club Hall, Doha; Attendance: 300; Referees: Kliko, Johansson (SWE)

9 September 2014; 20:00	Al Sadd (Qatar)	32–23	(Australia) Sydney University	Al-Gharafa Sports Club Hall, Doha; Attendance: 2,000; Referees: Koo, Lee (KOR)
9 September 2014; 20:00	Bannour 5	(18–13)	Hessellund 6	Al-Gharafa Sports Club Hall, Doha; Attendance: 2,000; Referees: Koo, Lee (KOR)
9 September 2014; 20:00	3× (yellow card) 3× (suspension)	Report	3× (yellow card) 8× (suspension)	Al-Gharafa Sports Club Hall, Doha; Attendance: 2,000; Referees: Koo, Lee (KOR)

== Knockout stage ==
=== Placement matches ===
Bracket

5th–8th-place semifinals
11 September
(Brazil) HC Taubaté	23
(Australia) Sydney University	15
11 September
(Qatar) Al Ahli	22
(Tunisia) Espérance de Tunis	38

5th-place match
12 September
(Brazil) HC Taubaté	31
(Tunisia) Espérance de Tunis	32
7th-place match
12 September
(Australia) Sydney University	24
(Qatar) Al Ahli	25

==== 5th–8th-place semifinals ====
11 September 2014; 14:00	Al Ahli (Qatar)	22–38	(Tunisia) Espérance de Tunis	Al-Gharafa Sports Club Hall, Doha; Attendance: 100; Referees: Nachevski, Nikolov (MKD)
11 September 2014; 14:00	Stanković, Paván 5	(10–16)	Bhar 9	Al-Gharafa Sports Club Hall, Doha; Attendance: 100; Referees: Nachevski, Nikolov (MKD)
11 September 2014; 14:00	3× (yellow card) 5× (suspension)	Report	3× (yellow card) 4× (suspension)	Al-Gharafa Sports Club Hall, Doha; Attendance: 100; Referees: Nachevski, Nikolov (MKD)

11 September 2014; 16:00	HC Taubaté (Brazil)	23–15	(Australia) Sydney University	Al-Gharafa Sports Club Hall, Doha; Attendance: 500; Referees: Kliko, Johansson (SWE)
11 September 2014; 16:00	Migueles 5	(11–7)	Lennström 3	Al-Gharafa Sports Club Hall, Doha; Attendance: 500; Referees: Kliko, Johansson (SWE)
11 September 2014; 16:00	3× (yellow card) 1× (suspension)	Report	3× (yellow card) 5× (suspension)	Al-Gharafa Sports Club Hall, Doha; Attendance: 500; Referees: Kliko, Johansson (SWE)

==== 5th-place match ====
12 September 2014; 13:30	Al Ahli (Qatar)	25–24	(Australia) Sydney University	Al-Gharafa Sports Club Hall, Doha; Attendance: 100; Referees: Rashed, El-Sayed (EGY)
12 September 2014; 13:30	Paván 7	(13–11)	Aubard 7	Al-Gharafa Sports Club Hall, Doha; Attendance: 100; Referees: Rashed, El-Sayed (EGY)
12 September 2014; 13:30	2× (yellow card) 2× (suspension)	Report	3× (yellow card) 4× (suspension)	Al-Gharafa Sports Club Hall, Doha; Attendance: 100; Referees: Rashed, El-Sayed (EGY)

==== 7th-place match ====
12 September 2014; 15:30	Espérance de Tunis (Tunisia)	32–31	(Brazil) HC Taubaté	Al-Gharafa Sports Club Hall, Doha; Attendance: 1,000; Referees: Lee, Koo (KOR)
12 September 2014; 15:30	Alouini 9	(18–16)	Silva 9	Al-Gharafa Sports Club Hall, Doha; Attendance: 1,000; Referees: Lee, Koo (KOR)
12 September 2014; 15:30	3× (yellow card) 4× (suspension)	Report	4× (yellow card) 6× (suspension)	Al-Gharafa Sports Club Hall, Doha; Attendance: 1,000; Referees: Lee, Koo (KOR)

=== Final round ===
Bracket

Semifinals
11 September
(Germany) Flensburg	26
(Qatar) Al Sadd	27
11 September
(Qatar) El Jaish	29
(Spain) FC Barcelona	39

Final
12 September
(Qatar) Al Sadd	26
(Spain) FC Barcelona	34
Bronze match
12 September
(Germany) Flensburg	27
(Qatar) El Jaish	17

==== Semifinals ====
11 September 2014; 18:00	Al Sadd (Qatar)	27–26	(Germany) Flensburg-Handewitt	Al-Gharafa Sports Club Hall, Doha; Attendance: 2,000; Referees: Rashed, El-Sayed (EGY)
11 September 2014; 18:00	Kević 8	(11–17)	Svan Hansen 8	Al-Gharafa Sports Club Hall, Doha; Attendance: 2,000; Referees: Rashed, El-Sayed (EGY)
11 September 2014; 18:00	3× (yellow card) 2× (suspension)	Report	3× (yellow card) 6× (suspension)	Al-Gharafa Sports Club Hall, Doha; Attendance: 2,000; Referees: Rashed, El-Sayed (EGY)

11 September 2014; 20:15	FC Barcelona (Spain)	39–29	(Qatar) El Jaish	Al-Gharafa Sports Club Hall, Doha; Attendance: 2,500; Referees: Gubica, Milošević (CRO)
11 September 2014; 20:15	Sigurðsson 7	(19–14)	Sanai 7	Al-Gharafa Sports Club Hall, Doha; Attendance: 2,500; Referees: Gubica, Milošević (CRO)
11 September 2014; 20:15	3× (yellow card) 5× (suspension)	Report	3× (yellow card) 3× (suspension)	Al-Gharafa Sports Club Hall, Doha; Attendance: 2,500; Referees: Gubica, Milošević (CRO)

==== Bronze match ====
12 September 2014; 17:30	Flensburg-Handewitt (Germany)	27–17	(Qatar) El Jaish	Al-Gharafa Sports Club Hall, Doha; Attendance: 2,500; Referees: Kliko, Johansson (SWE)
12 September 2014; 17:30	Jakobsson, Radivojević 6	(15–6)	Megannem 6	Al-Gharafa Sports Club Hall, Doha; Attendance: 2,500; Referees: Kliko, Johansson (SWE)
12 September 2014; 17:30	3× (yellow card) 4× (suspension)	Report	2× (yellow card) 3× (suspension)	Al-Gharafa Sports Club Hall, Doha; Attendance: 2,500; Referees: Kliko, Johansson (SWE)

==== Final ====
12 September 2014; 20:00	Al Sadd (Qatar)	26–34	(Spain) FC Barcelona	Al-Gharafa Sports Club Hall, Doha; Attendance: 3,000; Referees: Nachevski, Nikolov (MKD)
12 September 2014; 20:00	Bannour 6	(14–16)	three players 5	Al-Gharafa Sports Club Hall, Doha; Attendance: 3,000; Referees: Nachevski, Nikolov (MKD)
12 September 2014; 20:00	4× (yellow card) 2× (suspension)	Report	3× (yellow card) 3× (suspension)	Al-Gharafa Sports Club Hall, Doha; Attendance: 3,000; Referees: Nachevski, Nikolov (MKD)

== Final ranking ==
1	(Spain) FC Barcelona
2	(Qatar) Al Sadd
3	(Germany) Flensburg-Handewitt
4	(Qatar) El Jaish
5	(Tunisia) Espérance de Tunis
6	(Brazil) HC Taubaté
7	(Qatar) Al Ahli
8	(Australia) Sydney University
