= 2007 Oceania Women's Handball Champions Cup =

The 2007 Oceania Women's Handball Champions Cup was held in New Caledonia from the 12 to 15 September, 2007. With 8 teams from 5 countries competing in Noumea for the first edition of the Women's Oceania Champions Cup.

Local teams dominated the tournament with ACB Poya winning from fellow New Caledonia team CS Sinoj. Tahitian sides filled third, AS Dragon, and fourth, Tiare Anani. JS Mont Dore also from New Caledonia was fifth, Monash University from Australia sixth, then Auckland from New Zealand and HB Kafika from Wallis and Futuna.

== Final standings ==
Classification
1st place, gold medalist(s)	(New Caledonia) ACB Poya
2nd place, silver medalist(s)	(New Caledonia) CS Sinoj
3rd place, bronze medalist(s)	(French Polynesia) AS Dragon
4	(French Polynesia) Tiare Anani
5	(New Caledonia) JS Mont Dore
6	(Australia) Monash University
7	(New Zealand) Auckland Region
8	(Wallis and Futuna) HB Kafika
