= 2007 Oceania Handball Champions Cup =

The 2007 Oceania Handball Champions Cup was held in Tahiti from the 22 October to 2 November 2007. With 6 teams from 4 countries competing in Tahiti for the second edition of the Men Oceania Champions Cup, the level of play was much higher than during the first edition.

The final saw defending champions JS Mont Dore from New Caledonia taking another Oceania Champions Cup over hosts AS Dragon. The third place play off saw Australian side Canberra beat AS Dumbea of New Caledonia. Auckland were fifth and Tahitian side A.S. Faa'a were sixth.

== Modus ==
All six team played a round robin. The best two teams played the final. All games expect the final were 2×20 min. The final was the regular 2×30.

== Round robin stage ==
Pos	Team	Pld	W	D	L	GF	GA	GD	Pts	Qualification or relegation
1	(New Caledonia) JS Mont Dore	5	4	1	0	91	70	+21	14	Qualification for the final
2	(French Polynesia) AS Dragon	5	4	0	1	90	81	+9	13	Qualification for the final
3	(Australia) Canberra	5	2	1	2	83	84	−1	10	Qualification for the 3rd place game
4	(New Caledonia) AS Dumbea	5	2	1	2	82	93	−11	10	Qualification for the 3rd place game
5	(New Zealand) Auckland	5	1	1	3	81	82	−1	8	Qualification for the 5th place game
6	(French Polynesia) A.S. Faa'a	5	0	0	5	75	92	−17	5	Qualification for the 5th place game

Source: fthandball

Day 1:

28 October 2007	AS Dumbea (New Caledonia)	18–17	(French Polynesia) A.S. Faa'a
28 October 2007		(7–6)

28 October 2007	AS Dragon (French Polynesia)	16–15	(Australia) Canberra
28 October 2007		(10–8)

28 October 2007	JS Mont Dore (New Caledonia)	12–12	(Australia) Auckland
28 October 2007		(6–4)

Day 2:

29 October 2007	AS Dragon (French Polynesia)	16–11	(New Caledonia) AS Dumbea
29 October 2007		(6–5)

29 October 2007	Auckland (Australia)	15–11	(French Polynesia) A.S. Faa'a
29 October 2007		(6–7)

29 October 2007	JS Mont Dore (New Caledonia)	18–14	(Australia) Canberra
29 October 2007		(9–7)

Day 3:

30 October 2007	Canberra (Australia)	18–15	(French Polynesia) A.S. Faa'a
30 October 2007		(9–7)

30 October 2007	JS Mont Dore (New Caledonia)	18–15	(French Polynesia) AS Dragon
30 October 2007		(10–6)

30 October 2007	AS Dumbea (New Caledonia)	20–18	(Australia) Auckland
30 October 2007		(9–10)

Day 4:

31 October 2007	AS Dragon (French Polynesia)	20–16	(French Polynesia) A.S. Faa'a
31 October 2007		(10–8)

31 October 2007	JS Mont Dore (New Caledonia)	22–13	(New Caledonia) AS Dumbea
31 October 2007		(9–6)

31 October 2007	Canberra (Australia)	16–15	(Australia) Auckland
31 October 2007		(9–6)

1 November 2007	AS Dragon (French Polynesia)	23–21	(Australia) Auckland
1 November 2007		(10–10)

1 November 2007	JS Mont Dore (New Caledonia)	21–16	(French Polynesia) A.S. Faa'a
1 November 2007		(13–7)

1 November 2007	AS Dumbea (New Caledonia)	20–20	(Australia) Canberra
1 November 2007		(11–8)

== Placement games ==
=== 5th place game ===
1 November 2007; 15:00	Auckland (Australia)	24–21	(French Polynesia) A.S. Faa'a
1 November 2007; 15:00		(13–10)

=== 3rd place game ===
1 November 2007; 16:30	Canberra (Australia)	19–15	(New Caledonia) AS Dumbea
1 November 2007; 16:30		(9–7)

=== Final ===
1 November 2007; 19:30	JS Mont Dore (New Caledonia)	27–22	(French Polynesia) AS Dragon
1 November 2007; 19:30		(14–10)

== Final standings ==
Classification
1st place, gold medalist(s)	(New Caledonia) JS Mont Dore
2nd place, silver medalist(s)	(French Polynesia) AS Dragon
3rd place, bronze medalist(s)	(Australia) Canberra
4	(New Caledonia) AS Dumbea
5	(New Zealand) Auckland
6	(French Polynesia) A.S. Faa'a
