= 2013 African Handball Champions League =

Tournament details
- Host country: Morocco
- Venue: 1 (in 1 host city)
- Dates: October 3–12
- Teams: 11

Final positions
- Champions: (Tunisia) ES Tunis (1st title)
- Runners-up: (Egypt) Al Ahly
- Third place: (Tunisia) Club Africain
- Fourth place: (Cameroon) FAP Yaoundé

Tournament statistics
- Matches played: 39
- Goals scored: 2,058 (52.77 per match)

The 2013 African Handball Champions League was the 35th edition, organized by the African Handball Confederation, under the auspices of the International Handball Federation, the handball sport governing body. The tournament was held from October 3–12 in Marrakesh, Morocco, contested by 11 teams and won by Espérance Sportive de Tunis of Tunisia.

Espérance de Tunis qualified for the 2014 IHF Super Globe.

== Draw ==
| Group A | Group B |
|---|---|
| (Libya) Aljazeera Sports Club (Tunisia) Espérance de Tunis (Nigeria) Kano Pyramid (Morocco) HC Mouloudia (Angola) Primeiro de Agosto (Gabon) Stade Mandji | (Egypt) Al Ahly SC (Libya) Al-Hilal SC (Tunisia) Club Africain (Cameroon) FAP Yaoundé (Morocco) Wydad Smara |

== Preliminary round ==
Times given below are in WET UTC+0.

=== Group A ===
Thu, 3 Oct 2013
| ES Tunis (Tunisia) | 34 (17:11) 24 | (Libya) Aljazeera |
| Mouloudia (Morocco) | 22 (12:10) 21 | (Gabon) Stade Mandji |
| Kano Pyramid (Nigeria) | 0 (:) 20 | (Angola) 1º de Agosto |
Sat, 5 Oct 2013
| 1º de Agosto (Angola) | 36 (14:07) 19 | (Libya) Aljazeera |
| Mouloudia (Morocco) | 26 (09:13) 19 | (Nigeria) Kano Pyramid |
| ES Tunis (Tunisia) | 30 (12:14) 22 | (Gabon) Stade Mandji |
Sun, 6 Oct 2013
| Stade Mandji (Gabon) | 37 (15:16) 30 | (Libya) Aljazeera |
| Mouloudia (Morocco) | 25 (13:11) 27 | (Angola) 1º de Agosto |
| ES Tunis (Tunisia) | 45 (21:12) 28 | (Nigeria) Kano Pyramid |
Mon, 7 Oct 2013
| Kano Pyramid (Nigeria) | 27 (11:14) 31 | (Gabon) Stade Mandji |
| 1º de Agosto (Angola) | 25 (16:14) 27 | (Tunisia) ES Tunis |
| Mouloudia (Morocco) | 35 (16:18) 28 | (Libya) Aljazeera |
Tue, 8 Oct 2013
| Aljazeera (Libya) | 20 (09:14) 26 | (Nigeria) Kano Pyramid |
| 1º de Agosto (Angola) | 30 (12:16) 27 | (Gabon) Stade Mandji |
| ES Tunis (Tunisia) | 33 (18:13) 26 | (Morocco) Mouloudia |

| Team | Pld | W | D | L | GF | GA | GDIF | Pts |
|---|---|---|---|---|---|---|---|---|
| (Tunisia) ES Tunis | 5 | 5 | 0 | 0 | 169 | 125 | +44 | 10 |
| (Angola) 1º de Agosto | 5 | 4 | 0 | 1 | 138 | 98 | +40 | 8 |
| (Morocco) HC Mouloudia | 5 | 3 | 0 | 2 | 134 | 128 | +6 | 6 |
| (Gabon) Stade Mandji | 5 | 2 | 0 | 3 | 138 | 139 | -1 | 4 |
| (Nigeria) Kano Pyramid | 5 | 1 | 0 | 4 | 100 | 142 | -42 | 2 |
| (Libya) Aljazeera | 5 | 0 | 0 | 5 | 121 | 168 | -47 | 0 |

* Note: Advance to quarter-finals
Relegated to 9-11th classification

=== Group B ===
Thu, 03 Oct 2013
| Al Ahly (Egypt) | 29 (14:10) 19 | (Libya) Al-Hilal |
| FAP Youndé (Cameroon) | 24 (12:14) 29 | (Tunisia) Club Africain |
Sat, 05 Oct 2013
| Al-Hilal (Libya) | 22 (11:18) 31 | (Cameroon) FAP Youndé |
| Wydad Smara (Morocco) | 21 (10:14) 25 | (Egypt) Al Ahly |
Sun, 6 Oct 2013
| Wydad Smara (Morocco) | 18 (09:09) 17 | (Libya) Al-Hilal |
| Al Ahly (Egypt) | 22 (09:11) 21 | (Tunisia) Club Africain |
Mon, 7 Oct 2013
| FAP Youndé (Cameroon) | 41 (19:12) 25 | (Morocco) Wydad Smara |
| Club Africain (Tunisia) | 28 (14:12) 24 | (Libya) Al-Hilal |
Tue, 8 Oct 2013
| Club Africain (Tunisia) | 28 (13:09) 18 | (Morocco) Wydad Smara |
| Al Ahly (Egypt) | 29 (11:12) 24 | (Cameroon) FAP Youndé |

| Team | Pld | W | D | L | GF | GA | GDIF | Pts |
|---|---|---|---|---|---|---|---|---|
| (Egypt) Al Ahly SC | 4 | 4 | 0 | 0 | 105 | 85 | +20 | 8 |
| (Tunisia) Club Africain | 4 | 3 | 0 | 1 | 106 | 88 | +18 | 6 |
| (Cameroon) FAP Youndé | 4 | 2 | 0 | 2 | 120 | 105 | +15 | 4 |
| (Morocco) Wydad Smara | 4 | 1 | 0 | 3 | 82 | 111 | -29 | 2 |
| (Libya) Al-Hilal SC | 4 | 0 | 0 | 4 | 82 | 106 | -24 | 0 |

* Note: Advance to quarter-finals
Relegated to 9-11th classification

== Knockout stage ==
=== Bracket ===
Quarter-finals
Thu 10 Oct 2013 – 20:00
(Morocco) HC Mouloudia | 18
(Tunisia) Club Africain | 27
Thu 10 Oct 2013 – 15:00
(Tunisia) Espérance Tunis | 38
(Morocco) Wydad Smara | 27
Thu 10 Oct 2013 – 15:00
(Cameroon) FAP Yaoundé | 34
(Angola) 1º de Agosto | 33
Thu 10 Oct 2013 – 20:00
(Egypt) Al Ahly | 31
(Gabon) Stade Mandji | 30

Semi-finals
Fri 11 Oct 2013 – 17:00
(Tunisia) Club Africain | 23
(Tunisia) Espérance Tunis | 28
Fri 11 Oct 2013 – 19:30
(Cameroon) FAP Yaoundé | 26
(Egypt) Al Ahly | 32

Final
Sat 12 Oct 2013 – 17:30
(Tunisia) Espérance Tunis | 31
(Egypt) Al Ahly | 24
Third place
Sat 12 Oct 2013 – 13:00
(Tunisia) Club Africain | 31
(Cameroon) FAP Yaoundé | 28

5-8th bracket

5-8th place
Fri 11 Oct 2013 – 16:00
(Angola) 1º de Agosto | 35
(Gabon) Stade Mandji | 18
Fri 11 Oct 2013 – 18:00
(Morocco) Wydad Smara | 20
(Morocco) HC Mouloudia | 21

Fifth place
Sat 12 Oct 2013 – 13:00
(Angola) 1º de Agosto | 26
(Morocco) HC Mouloudia | 19
Seventh place
Sat 12 Oct 2013 – 11:00
(Morocco) Wydad Smara | 33
(Gabon) Stade Mandji | 31

9-11th bracket

9-11th place
(Nigeria) Kano Pyramid
Thu 10 Oct 2013 – 10:00
(Libya) Aljazeera | 26
(Libya) Al-Hilal | 21

Ninth place
Fri 11 Oct 2013 – 13:00
(Nigeria) Kano Pyramid | 27
(Libya) Al-Hilal | 25
Third place

== Final ranking ==
| Rank | Team | Record |
|---|---|---|
| Gold medal | (Tunisia) ES Tunis | 8–0 |
| Silver medal | (Egypt) Al Ahly SC | 6–1 |
| Bronze medal | (Tunisia) Club Africain | 5–2 |
| 4 | (Cameroon) FAP Yaoundé | 3–4 |
| 5 | (Angola) 1º de Agosto | 6–2 |
| 6 | (Morocco) HC Mouloudia | 4–4 |
| 7 | (Morocco) Wydad Smara | 2–5 |
| 8 | (Gabon) Stade Mandji | 2–6 |
| 9 | (Nigeria) Kano Pyramid | 2–4 |
| 10 | (Libya) Aljazeera SC | 1–5 |
| 11 | (Libya) Al-Hilal SC | 0–6 |

* Note: Qualified to the 2014 IHF Super Globe

== Awards ==
2013 African Handball Champions Cup Winner

Espérance Sportive de Tunis
1st title

Best Player

== See also ==
- 2014 African Handball Championship
