= Aymen Hammed =

Tunisian handball player

Personal information
- Nationality: Tunisian
- Born: 26 July 1983 (age 43) Msaken
- Height: 1.96 m (6 ft 5 in)

Sport
- Sport: Handball
- Position: Right back
- Current club: Espérance de Tunis
- Number: 27

Senior clubs
- Years: Team
- 2005-2009: Club Africain
- 2009-2011: Montpellier Handball
- 2011-2013: Club Africain
- 2013-: ES Tunis
National team
Years	Team	Apps	(Gls)
–	Tunisia	114	(380)

Aymen Hammed (born 26 July 1983) is a Tunisian handball player for Espérance de Tunis and the Tunisian national team.
