= 2008 Oceania Handball Champions Cup =

The 2008 Oceania Handball Champions Cup was in New Caledonia 2–8 November 2008 with seven teams from five countries competing for the third edition of the Men Oceania Champions Cup.

The final saw AS Dumbea from New Caledonia finally winning an Oceania Champions Cup over former champions JS Mont Dore. The third place play off saw the Wellington Falcons of New Zealand beat Tahitian side AS Faa'a. A Sydney regional team were fifth and Tahitian side AS Tohieva were sixth. HB Kafika from Wallis and Futuna rounded out the field in seventh.

== Final standings ==
Classification
1st place, gold medalist(s)	(New Caledonia) AS Dumbea
2nd place, silver medalist(s)	(New Caledonia) JS Mont Dore
3rd place, bronze medalist(s)	(New Zealand) Wellington
4	(French Polynesia) AS Faa'a
5	(Australia) Sydney Region
6	(French Polynesia) AS Tohieva
7	(Wallis and Futuna) HB Kafika
