= 2015 Oceania Handball Champions Cup =

The 2015 Oceania Handball Champions Cup was held in Sydney, Australia from 6 to 8 June 2015. This was organised by the Oceania Handball Federation and featured two teams from Australia and one from New Caledonia.

The winner was Sydney University, retaining their title and will represent Oceania in the 2015 IHF Super Globe.

== Results ==
Team	Pld	W	D	L	GF	GA	GD	Pts
Sydney University	2	2	0	0	62	38	+24	4
Saint Kilda Handball Club	2	1	0	1	43	44	−1	2
AS Dumbea	2	0	0	2	42	65	−23	0

=== Round Robin Stage ===
6 June 2015; 19:30	(New Caledonia) AS Dumbea	20 – 27	(Australia) St Kilda HC	Sydney Olympic Park; Referees: Ridley, Ridley (AUS)
6 June 2015; 19:30		(10 - 11)		Sydney Olympic Park; Referees: Ridley, Ridley (AUS)

7 June 2015; 11:00	(Australia) St Kilda HC	16 – 24	(Australia) Sydney University	Sydney Olympic Park
7 June 2015; 11:00		(10 - 11)		Sydney Olympic Park

7 June 2015; 19:30	(Australia) Sydney University	38 – 22	(New Caledonia) AS Dumbea	Sydney Olympic Park; Referees: Ridley, Ridley (AUS)
7 June 2015; 19:30		(22 - 10)		Sydney Olympic Park; Referees: Ridley, Ridley (AUS)

=== Final ===
8 June 2015; 13:00	(Australia) Sydney University	23 - 16	(Australia) St Kilda HC	Sydney Olympic Park; Referees: Ridley, Ridley (AUS)
8 June 2015; 13:00		(13 - 7)		Sydney Olympic Park; Referees: Ridley, Ridley (AUS)

== Final standings ==
Classification
1st place, gold medalist(s)	(Australia) Sydney University
2nd place, silver medalist(s)	(Australia) Saint Kilda Handball Club
3rd place, bronze medalist(s)	(New Caledonia) AS Dumbea
