= JS Mont Dore (handball) =

- Full name: Jeunesse Sportive du Mont Dore
- League: FFHB Ligue De Handball Nouvelle Caledonie
- Club colours
| Home | Away |

The Jeunesse Sportive du Mont Dore is a handball club in New Caledonia.

== Records ==
=== Men ===
- Oceania Handball Champions Cup - 2 titles

Winners - 2006, 2007
Runners-up - 2008

=== Women ===
- Oceania Women's Handball Champions Cup

Best Finish - 5th 2007

== See also ==
- Oceania Handball Champions Cup
- Oceania Women's Handball Champions Cup
