= 2013 Arab Handball Championship of Winners' Cup =

Tournament details
- Host country: Morocco
- City: Marrakesh
- Dates: 19 – 29 March 2013
- Teams: 15 (from 2 confederations)

Final positions
- Champions: (Tunisia) ES Tunis
- Runners-up: (Saudi Arabia) Al-Ahli SC
- Third place: (Algeria) GS Pétroliers

The 2013 Arab Handball Championship of Club Winners' Cup is the 10th edition of the Arab Handball Championship of Winners' Cup, it's concerne Arab world's premier club handball tournament held in Marrakesh, Morocco. Al Ahly SC is the defending champion.

== Venues ==
- Salle M'hamid, Marrakesh
- Salle Sidi Youssef Ben Ali, Marrakesh

== Group stage ==
=== Group A ===
Team	Pld	W	D	L	GF	GA	GD	Pts
(Tunisia) ES Tunis	4	4	0	0	137	94	+43	8
(Libya) Al-Ahly SC	4	2	1	1	100	109	−9	5
(Kuwait) Qadsia SC	4	2	0	2	103	106	−3	4
(Iraq) Naft Al-Janoob	4	1	1	2	101	108	−7	3
(Oman) Al-Ahli SC	4	0	0	4	107	131	−24	0

=== Group B ===
Team	Pld	W	D	L	GF	GA	GD	Pts
(Algeria) GS Pétroliers	4	4	0	0	111	85	+26	8
(Bahrain) Al-Najma	4	2	1	1	119	110	+9	5
(Morocco) MC Marrakech	4	2	1	1	104	98	+6	5
(Libya) Al-Nasr SC	4	1	0	3	99	116	−17	2
(Oman) Seeb SC	4	0	0	4	93	117	−24	0

=== Group C ===
Team	Pld	W	D	L	GF	GA	GD	Pts
(Tunisia) EM Mahdia	4	4	0	0	127	87	+40	8
(Saudi Arabia) Al-Ahli SC	4	3	0	1	121	98	+23	6
(Algeria) ES Aïn Touta	4	2	0	2	118	93	+25	4
(Iraq) Al-Jaish SC	4	1	0	3	95	108	−13	2
(Yemen) Al-Saqr SC	4	0	0	4	84	159	−75	0

== Knockout stage ==
Quarter-finals
25 March – Marrakesh
(Saudi Arabia) Al-Ahli SC	38
(Bahrain) Al-Najma	33
25 March – Marrakesh
(Tunisia) EM Mahdia	38
(Libya) Al-Ahly SC	21
25 March – Marrakesh
(Tunisia) ES Tunis	27
(Algeria) ES Aïn Touta	23
25 March – Marrakesh
(Algeria) GS Pétroliers	23
(Morocco) MC Marrakech	21

Semi-finals
27 March – Marrakesh
(Saudi Arabia) Al-Ahli SC	27
(Algeria) GS Pétroliers	16
27 March – Marrakesh
(Tunisia) EM Mahdia	32
(Tunisia) ES Tunis	33 (a.e.t.)

Final
29 March – Marrakesh
(Saudi Arabia) Al-Ahli SC	23
(Tunisia) ES Tunis	25
Third place
29 March – Marrakesh
(Algeria) GS Pétroliers	32 (3)
(Tunisia) EM Mahdia	32 (2)

=== Quarterfinals ===
25 March 2013; 17:00	Al-Ahli SC (Saudi Arabia)	38 – 33	(Bahrain) Al-Najma	Salle M'hamid, Marrakesh

25 March 2013; 17:00	EM Mahdia (Tunisia)	38 – 21	(Libya) Al-Ahly SC	Salle Sidi Youssef Ben Ali, Marrakesh

25 March 2013; 19:30	ES Tunis (Tunisia)	27 – 23	(Algeria) ES Aïn Touta	Salle Sidi Youssef Ben Ali, Marrakesh

25 March 2013; 19:30	GS Pétroliers (Algeria)	23 – 21	(Morocco) MC Marrakech	Salle M'hamid, Marrakesh

=== Semifinals ===
27 March 2013; 17:00	Al-Ahli SC (Saudi Arabia)	27 – 16	(Algeria) GS Pétroliers	Salle M'hamid, Marrakesh

27 March 2013; 19:30	EM Mahdia (Tunisia)	32 – 33 (a.e.t.)	(Tunisia) ES Tunis	Salle M'hamid, Marrakesh

=== 3rd Place Match ===
29 March 2013; 15:30	GS Pétroliers (Algeria)	32 – 32 (P: 5-4)	(Tunisia) EM Mahdia	..., Marrakesh
29 March 2013; 15:30		(16–12)		..., Marrakesh

=== Final ===
29 March 2013; 17:30	Al-Ahli SC (Saudi Arabia)	23 – 25	(Tunisia) ES Tunis	Salle M'hamid, Marrakesh
29 March 2013; 17:30		(12–13)		Salle M'hamid, Marrakesh
