= A.S. Faa'a =

Tahitian handball club

A.S Faa'a
- Full name: Association Sportive AS Faa'a Handball
- League: Tahitian Handball League
- Club colours
Home	Away

The Association Sportive Faa'a is a handball club in Papeete, Tahiti. They play in the Tahitian Handball League.

== Records ==
=== Men ===
- Oceania Handball Champions Cup

Runners-up - 2009

- Tahitian Handball League - 8 titles

Winners - 1999, 2002, 2008, 2009, 2010, 2011, 2012, 2013

=== Women ===
- Tahitian Handball League - 1 titles

Winners - 2013
