= 2022 African Handball Champions League =

Tournament details
- Host country: Tunisia
- Venue(s): 2 (in 2 host cities)
- Dates: 30 September - 9 October 2022
- Teams: 10 (from 1 confederation)

Final positions
- Champions: (Tunisia) ES Tunis HC (2nd title)
- Runners-up: (Egypt) Zamalek SC
- Third place: (Egypt) Al Ahly SC
- Fourth place: (Tunisia) Club Africain

Tournament statistics
- Matches played: 33

The 2022 African Handball Champions League was the 43rd edition, organized by the African Handball Confederation, under the auspices of the International Handball Federation, the handball sport governing body. The tournament was held from the 30 September to 9 October 2022 in Hammamet and Nabeul in Tunisia.

== Draw ==
The draw took place on 30 August 2022 in Kigali (Rwanda).

Group A	Group B
(Tunisia) Club Africain (Egypt) Zamalek SC (Cameroon) FAP Yaoundé (Ivory Coast) Red Star (Algeria) MC Alger	(Egypt) Al Ahly SC (Tunisia) ES Tunis HC (Democratic Republic of the Congo) JS Kinshasa (Benin) Flowers HBC (Algeria) ES Ain Touta

== Preliminary rounds ==
=== Group A ===
Team	Pld	W	D	L	GF	GA	GDIF	Pts
(Tunisia) Club Africain	4	4	0	0	132	105	+27	8
(Egypt) Zamalek SC	4	3	0	1	148	96	+52	6
(Algeria) MC Alger	4	2	0	2	107	115	-8	4
(Ivory Coast) Red Star	4	1	0	3	111	135	-24	2
(Cameroon) FAP Yaoundé	4	0	0	4	100	147	-47	0

=== Group B ===
Team	Pld	W	D	L	GF	GA	GDIF	Pts
(Egypt) Al Ahly SC	4	4	0	0	143	63	+80	8
(Tunisia) ES Tunis HC	4	3	0	1	137	103	+34	6
(Democratic Republic of the Congo) JS Kinshasa	4	2	0	2	99	135	-36	4
(Algeria) ES Ain Touta	4	1	0	3	92	119	-27	2
(Benin) Flowers HBC	4	0	0	4	81	132	-51	0

== Knockout stage ==
Championship bracket

Quarter-finals
6 Oct 2022 – 17:00
(Tunisia) Club Africain	31
(Algeria) ES Ain Touta	23
6 Oct 2022 – 13:00
(Tunisia) ES Tunis HC	26
(Algeria) MC Alger	25
6 Oct 2022 – 11:00
(Egypt) Al Ahly SC	43
(Ivory Coast) Red Star	26
6 Oct 2022 – 19:00
(Egypt) Zamalek SC	33
(Democratic Republic of the Congo) JS Kinshasa	17

Semi-finals
7 Oct 2022 – 15:00
(Tunisia) Club Africain	22
(Tunisia) ES Tunis HC	30
7 Oct 2022 – 17:30
(Egypt) Al Ahly SC	25
(Egypt) Zamalek SC	26

Final
9 Oct 2022 – 17:30
(Tunisia) ES Tunis HC	28
(Egypt) Zamalek SC	24
Third place
9 Oct 2022 – 13:00
(Tunisia) Club Africain	22
(Egypt) Al Ahly SC	30

5-8th bracket

5–8th place
7 Oct 2022
(Algeria) ES Ain Touta	26
(Algeria) MC Alger	23
7 Oct 2022
(Democratic Republic of the Congo) JS Kinshasa	28
(Ivory Coast) Red Star	24

Fifth place
8 Oct 2022
(Algeria) ES Ain Touta	23
(Democratic Republic of the Congo) JS Kinshasa	27
Seventh place
8 Oct 2022
(Algeria) MC Alger	23
(Ivory Coast) Red Star	25

== Awards ==
2022 African Handball Champions League winner

ES Tunis HC
2nd title
