= 2011 Oceania Handball Champions Cup =

The 2011 Oceania Handball Champions Cup was held in Tahiti from the 5 to 10 November 2011. This was organised by the Oceania Handball Federation and featured teams from Australia, New Zealand, New Caledonia and host's Tahiti.

The tournament was won by Australian team Sydney University. They won the right to represent Oceania in the 2012 IHF Super Globe.

== Results ==
=== Round robin stage ===
Team	Pld	W	D	L	GF	GA	GD	Pts
(French Polynesia) AS Dragon	5	4	1	0	98	67	+31	9
(Australia) Sydney University	5	3	2	0	86	77	+9	8
(French Polynesia) AS Faa'a	5	2	2	1	82	73	+9	6
(New Caledonia) ACB Poya	5	2	0	3	98	99	−1	4
(New Zealand) Auckland Region	5	0	2	3	75	87	−12	2
(New Caledonia) AS Dumbea	5	0	1	4	79	98	−19	1

5 November 2011; 16:30	(New Caledonia) ACB Poya	24– 19	(New Zealand) Auckland Region

18:00	(French Polynesia) AS Faa'a	16 – 16	(Australia) Sydney University

19:30	(French Polynesia) AS Dragon	27 – 15	(New Caledonia) AS Dumbea

6 November 2011; 16:30	(Australia) Sydney University	18 – 17	(New Caledonia) ACB Poya

18:00	(French Polynesia) AS Dragon	20 – 13	(New Zealand) Auckland Region

19:30	(French Polynesia) AS Faa'a	20 – 13	(New Caledonia) AS Dumbea

7 November 2011; 16:30	(New Zealand) Auckland Region	16 – 16	(New Caledonia) AS Dumbea

18:00	(French Polynesia) AS Faa'a	21 – 16	(New Caledonia) ACB Poya

19:30	(French Polynesia) AS Dragon	10 – 10	(Australia) Sydney University

8 November 2011; 16:30	(New Zealand) Auckland Region	17 – 22	(Australia) Sydney University

18:00	(New Caledonia) AS Dumbea	18 – 27	(New Caledonia) ACB Poya

19:30	(French Polynesia) AS Dragon	18 – 15	(French Polynesia) AS Faa'a

9 November 2011; 16:30	(New Caledonia) AS Dumbea	17 – 20	(Australia) Sydney University

18:00	(French Polynesia) AS Dragon	23 – 14	(New Caledonia) ACB Poya

19:30	(French Polynesia) AS Faa'a	10 – 10	(New Zealand) Auckland Region

=== Fifth Place play off ===
10 November 2011; 13:00	(New Zealand) Auckland Region	20 - 22	(New Caledonia) AS Dumbea

=== Third Place play off ===
10 November 2011; 14:30	(French Polynesia) AS Faa'a	21 - 22	(New Caledonia) ACB Poya

=== Final ===
10 November 2011; 18:00	(French Polynesia) AS Dragon	22 – 23	(Australia) Sydney University

== Final standings ==
Classification
1st place, gold medalist(s)	(Australia) Sydney University
2nd place, silver medalist(s)	(French Polynesia) AS Dragon
3rd place, bronze medalist(s)	(New Caledonia) ACB Poya
4	(French Polynesia) AS Faa'a
5	(New Caledonia) AS Dumbea
6	(New Zealand) Auckland Region
