= 2006 Oceania Handball Champions Cup =

The 2006 Oceania Handball Champions Cup was held in Noumea, New Caledonia in September, 2006. This was the first edition of the Men Oceania Champions Cup, organized in Noumea by the Ligue de Hand Ball Nouvelle Caledonie (LHBNC).

The final between the two best teams from New Caledonia saw JS Mont Dore taking the first ever Oceania Champions Cup. The third place play off, Auckland finished fourth after a last game lost after extra-time against the team from Wallis and Futuna.

== Final standings ==
Classification
1st place, gold medalist(s)	(New Caledonia) JS Mont Dore
2nd place, silver medalist(s)	(New Caledonia) AS Dumbea
3rd place, bronze medalist(s)	(Wallis and Futuna) HB Kafika
4	(New Zealand) Auckland Region
5	(French Polynesia) AS Faa'a
6	(Vanuatu) Golden Stars
