= 2009 Oceania Handball Champions Cup =

The 2009 Oceania Handball Champions Cup featured nine teams from five countries competing for the fourth edition of the Men Oceania Champions Cup held in New Zealand.

The final saw Sydney Region from Australia winning an Oceania Champions Cup over Tahitian side AS Faa'a. The third place play off saw a replay of last years final with AS Dumbea winning over fellow New Caledonia side JS Mont Dore. Wellington from New Zealand were fifth and the second Australian side Melbourne sixth. AS Taravao from Tahiti seventh, Northland from New Zealand eighth and AS Lulu from Wallis and Futuna rounded out the field in ninth.

== Final standings ==
Classification
| 1st place, gold medalist(s) | (Australia) Sydney Region |
| 2nd place, silver medalist(s) | (French Polynesia) AS Faa'a |
| 3rd place, bronze medalist(s) | (New Caledonia) AS Dumbea |
| 4 | (New Caledonia) JS Mont Dore |
| 5 | (New Zealand) Wellington |
| 6 | (Australia) Melbourne HC |
| 7 | (French Polynesia) AS Taravao HBC |
| 8 | (New Zealand) Northland |
| 9 | (Wallis and Futuna) A.S. Lulu |
