= Espérance Sportive de Tunis (handball) =

Espérance Sportive de Tunis الترجى الرياضى التونسى
- Full name: Espérance Sportive de Tunis
- Nickname(s): (Mkachkha) المكشخة (Blood and Gold) الدم و الذهب (Bab Souika's Team) فريق باب سويقة
- Short name: EST
- Founded: 1957
- Arena: Salle Mohamed-Zouaoui
- Capacity: 3,000
- President: Hamdi Meddeb
- Head coach: Bassem Sabki
- League: National A
- 2024–25: National A, 1st
Home	Away

Espérance Sportive de Tunis Handball (Arabic: الترجي الرياضي التونسي لكرة اليد) is a Tunisian handball team based in Tunis, that plays in Tunisian Professional Handball League. The club holds 36 domestic league titles, setting a world record, as well as various continental and regional titles.

== History ==
The most titled club in the country, Espérance Sportive de Tunis joined the national division at the end of the 1958–1959 season with a squad led by Moncef Hajjar, Lamine Kallel, Chedly Ben Slimane, and Mongi Haddad. Subsequently, the team won its first title in 1963 by defeating Al Mansoura Chaabia of Hammam Lif in the cup final.

Among its key players were Moncef Hajjar, Mounir Jelili, Moncef Besbes, Fawzi Sbabti, Faouzi Ksouri, Khaled Achour, Zouheir Khenissi, Habib Yagouta, Sami Agrebi, Mohamed Madi, Karim Zaghouani, Issam Tej, Wissem Hmam, Jaleleddine Touati, Mahmoud Gharbi, and Heykel Megannem.

Espérance's dominance extended to the Arab Club Championship, where they won the first four editions before boycotting the competition for non-sporting reasons. The club also boasts three African Cup Winners' Cups (won in 2003, 2014, and 2015), one African Champions League title (won in 2013), and two African Super Cups (won in 2014 and 2016).

The team participated in the IHF Men's Super Globe in 2014, 2016, 2017, and 2022.

== Honours ==
=== National titles ===
- Tunisian Handball League :(38) (Record)

Champions : 1966–67, 1968–69, 1970–71, 1971–72, 1972–73, 1973–74, 1974–75, 1975–76, 1976–77, 1977–78, 1978–79, 1979–80, 1980–81, 1981–82, 1982–83, 1983–84, 1984–85, 1990–91, 1991–92, 1992–93, 1994–95, 1996–97, 2003–04, 2004–05, 2008–09, 2009–10, 2011–12, 2012–13, 2013–14, 2015–16, 2016–17, 2018–19, 2019–20, 2020–21, 2022–23, 2023–24, 2024–25, 2025-26

- Tunisian Handball Cup :(31) (Record)

Champions : 1959–60, 1969–70, 1970–71, 1971–72, 1972–73, 1973–74, 1974–75, 1975–76, 1977–78, 1978–79, 1979–80, 1980–81, 1981–82, 1982–83, 1983–84, 1984–85, 1985–86, 1991–92, 1992–93, 1993–94, 1994–95, 2001–02, 2004–05, 2005–06, 2012–13, 2017–18, 2020–21, 2021–22, 2022–23, 2023–24, 2024–25

- Tunisian Handball Super Cup :(2)

Winners : 1999–00, 2001–02

- Federation Cup :(1)

Winners : 2019

=== International titles ===
African Handball Champions League :(2)

- Champions : 2013, 2022
- Runners-up : 1993, 2005, 2016, 2017

African Handball Cup Winners' Cup :(4)

- Champions : 2003, 2014, 2015, 2024
- Runners-up : 2004, 2016

African Handball Super Cup :(2)

- Winners: 2014, 2016
- Runners-up : 2004, 2025

=== Regional titles ===
- Arab Handball Championship of Champions :(7)

Champions : 1976, 1977, 1978, 1979, 2018, 2021, 2022
Runners-up : 1980, 2001

- Arab Handball Championship of Winners' Cup :(1)

Champions : 2013

- Arab Handball Super Cup :(1)

Champions : 2019

- Double

Winners (19): 1970–71, 1971–72, 1972–73, 1973–74, 1974–75, 1975–76, 1977–78, 1978–79, 1979–80, 1980–81, 1981–82, 1982–83, 1983–84, 1984–85, 1991–92, 1992–93, 1994–95, 2004–05, 2012–13

- Triple

Winners (1): 2012–13

=== Worldwide ===
- Super Globe
  - Fifth-Place (3): 2014, 2016, 2022
  - Sixth-Place (1): 2017

== Team ==
=== Current squad ===
Esperance de Tunis Handball roster
Goalkeepers: 01 (Tunisia) Amine Bedoui; 16 (Tunisia) Driss Idrissi (C); 81 (Tunisia) Hamza Berrich; Wingers: 29 (Tunisia) Tarek Jallouz; 5 (Tunisia) Adam Said El Majed; 13 (Tunisia) Mohamed Ali Bhar; 21 (Tunisia) Oussama Boughanmi; 43 (Tunisia) Chafik Boukadida; Line players: 03 (Tunisia) Ameur Mahmoud; 06 (Tunisia) Ilyes Hchicha	Back players: 07 (Tunisia) Jilani Mami; 08 (Tunisia) Naceur Gaabeb; 77 (Tunisia) Jabeur Yahiaoui; 88 (Tunisia) Anis Mahmoudi; 05 (Tunisia) Houssam Hmam; 20 (Tunisia) Bassem Mrabet; 44 (Tunisia) Kamel Alouini; 27 (Tunisia) Aymen Hammed	Technical staff: Head coach (Egypt) Bassem Sabki; Assistant coach (Tunisia); Director (Tunisia); Club doctor (Tunisia)

=== Notable players ===
- (Tunisia) Wissem Hmam
- (Tunisia) Heykel Megannem
- (Tunisia) Mahmoud Gharbi
- (Tunisia) Jaleleddine Touati
- (Tunisia) Makrem Jerou
- (Tunisia) Kamel Alouini
