= Oceania Handball Champions Cup =

International club championship for men featuring teams from Oceania

The Oceania Handball Champions Cup is an international club championship for men featuring teams from the Oceania region.

The winners of this tournament qualify for the IHF Super Globe (World club championship).

== Champions ==
Year	Venue	Final		
Year	Venue	Winner	Score	Runner-up
2006	New Caledonia	(New Caledonia) JS Mont Dore	unknown	(New Caledonia) AS Dumbea
2007	Tahiti	(New Caledonia) JS Mont Dore	unknown	(French Polynesia) AS Dragon
2008	New Caledonia	(New Caledonia) AS Dumbea	unknown	(New Caledonia) JS Mont Dore
2009	Tahiti	(Australia) Sydney Region	unknown	(French Polynesia) AS Faa'a
2010	New Caledonia	(New Caledonia) AS Dumbea	30 - 29	(French Polynesia) AS Dragon
2011	Tahiti	(Australia) Sydney University	23 - 22	(French Polynesia) AS Dragon
2012	no tiles held			
2013	Sydney, Australia	(Australia) Sydney University	51 - 41 (2 legs)	(New Zealand) Auckland Region
2014	New Caledonia	(Australia) Sydney University	24 – 23	(Australia) Saint Kilda Handball Club
2015	Sydney, Australia	(Australia) Sydney University	23 – 16	(Australia) Saint Kilda Handball Club
2016	Geelong, Victoria	(Australia) Sydney University	30 – 18	(Australia) West Adelaide
2017	Geelong, Victoria	(Australia) Sydney University	30 – 26	(Australia) University of Technology Sydney
2018	Geelong, Victoria	(Australia) Sydney University	30 – 14	(Australia) University of Technology Sydney
2019	Gold Coast, Queensland	(Australia) Sydney University	33 – 32	(Australia) University of Queensland
2020	Cancelled due to Covid-19			
2021	Gold Coast, Queensland	(Australia) University of Queensland	27 – 17	(Australia) Saint Kilda Handball Club
2022	Gold Coast, Queensland	(Australia) Sydney University	26 – 21	(Australia) University of Queensland
2023	Canberra, ACT	(Australia) University of Queensland	31 – 25	(Australia) Saint Kilda Handball Club
2024	Canberra, ACT	(Australia) Sydney University	23 – 20	(Australia) University of Queensland
2025	Coffs Harbour, New South Wales	(Australia) Sydney University	30 – 19	(Australia) University of Queensland

== Club performance ==
Rank	Club	Starts	Won	R/U	Third	Other
1	(Australia) Sydney University	13	11	0	1	1
2	(New Caledonia) AS Dumbea	8	2	1	2	3
3	(New Caledonia) JS Mont Dore	4	2	1	0	1
4	(Australia) University of Queensland	5	1	2	1	1
5	(Australia) Sydney Region	2	1	0	0	1
6	(French Polynesia) AS Dragon	3	0	3	0	0
7	(Australia) Saint Kilda Handball Club	6	0	2	3	1
8	(Australia) University of Technology Sydney	5	0	2	1	2
9	(French Polynesia) AS Faa'a	5	0	1	1	3
10	(New Zealand) Auckland Region	4	0	1	0	3
11	(Australia) West Adelaide	2	0	1	0	1
12	(Australia) Canberra	4	0	0	3	1
13	(New Caledonia) ACB Poya	3	0	0	1	2
=	(New Zealand) Wellington	2	0	0	1	1
=	(Wallis and Futuna) HB Kafika	2	0	0	1	1
16	(Australia) Brisbane Wolves HC	2	0	0	0	2
=	(Australia) Deakin University	2	0	0	0	2
=	(Australia) Melbourne HC	3	0	0	0	3
=	(Vanuatu) Golden Stars	1	0	0	0	1
=	(French Polynesia) AS Tohieva	1	0	0	0	1
=	(Wallis and Futuna) AS Lulu	1	0	0	0	1
=	(New Zealand) Northland	1	0	0	0	1
=	(New Caledonia) Olympique de Nouméa	1	0	0	0	1
=	(Australia) Handball West	1	0	0	0	1

== Titles by nations ==
Rank	Country	Champion	Runner up	Third	Appearances
1	Australia	10	6	5	34
2	New Caledonia	4	2	4	16
3	Tahiti	0	4	1	9
4	New Zealand	0	1	1	7
5	Wallis and Futuna	0	0	1	3
6	Vanuatu	0	0	0	1

== See also ==
- Oceania Continent Handball Federation
- Oceania Women's Handball Champions Cup
