= Kamel Alouini =

Tunisian handball player

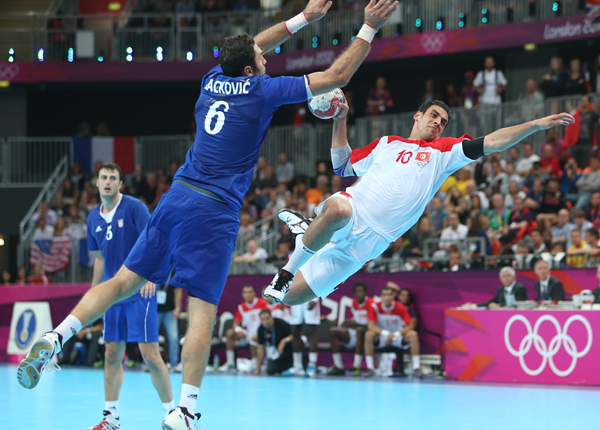

Personal information
- Nationality: Tunisian
- Born: 6 July 1988 (age 38) La Marsa, Tunisia
- Height: 1.82 m (6 ft 0 in)

Sport
- Sport: Handball
- Position: Centre back
- Current club: Dunkerque HGL
- Number: 10

Senior clubs
- Years: Team
- –2008: ES Tunis
- 2008–2010: Istres OPH
- 2010–2012: Club Africain
- 2012–2017: ES Tunis
- 2017–2018: Al-Ahli SC
- 2018–2020: CS Dinamo București
- 2020–2021: Al-Nasr
- 2021–2022: CS Dinamo București
- 2022–: Dunkerque HGL
National team
Years	Team	Apps	(Gls)
2010–	Tunisia	131	(261)
Medal record
African Championship
Gold medal – first place	2012 Morocco
Gold medal – first place	2018 Gabon
Silver medal – second place	2020 Tunisia
Mediterranean Games
Silver medal – second place	2018 Tarragona	Team
Pan Arab Games
Bronze medal – third place	2011 Qatar

Kamel Alouini (born 6 July 1988) is a Tunisian handball player for Dunkerque HGL and the Tunisian national team.

== Achievements ==
- Tunisian League:
  - Winner: 2013, 2014, 2016, 2017
- Tunisian Cup:
  - Winner: 2011, 2013
- Romanian League:
  - Winner: 2019
- Romanian Supercup:
  - Winner: 2018, 2019
- French League Cup:
  - Winner: 2009
- African Championship:
  - Gold Medalist: 2012, 2018
- Pan Arab Games:
  - Bronze Medalist: 2011

== Individual awards ==
- Supercupa României MVP: 2018
