= A.S. Dragon (handball) =

Tahitian handball club

- Full name: Association Sportive Dragon Handball
- League: Tahitian Handball League
- Club colours
Home	Away

The Association Sportive Dragon is a handball club in Papeete, Tahiti. They play in the Tahitian Handball League. The club was an offshoot of the football team A.S Dragon Football.

== Records ==
=== Men ===
- Oceania Handball Champions Cup

Runners-up - 2007, 2010, 2011

- Tahitian Handball League - 6 titles

Winners - 1991, 1995, 1996, 2000, 2006, 2007

=== Women ===
- Oceania Women's Handball Champions Cup - 2 titles

Winners - 2008, 2010
Runners-up - 2009
Third - 2007

- Tahitian Handball League - 11 titles

Winners - 1990, 1992, 1993, 1994, 1995, 1996, 1999, 2000, 2004, 2006, 2007
