= 2010 Oceania Women's Handball Champions Cup =

The 2010 Oceania Women's Handball Champions Cup was held in Tahiti with six teams from four countries competing for the fourth edition of the Women's Oceania Champions Cup.

Tahitian and New Caledonian teams dominated the tournament with AS Dragon winning from New Caledonia team AS Dumbea in finale 29-21. Local Tahitian side AS Excelsior were beaten in the bronze medal playoff by New Caledonia team ACB Poya. Then Canterbury Region from New Zealand were fifth and HB Kafika from Wallis and Futuna sixth.

== Final standings ==
Classification
1st place, gold medalist(s)	(French Polynesia) AS Dragon
2nd place, silver medalist(s)	(New Caledonia) AS Dumbea
3rd place, bronze medalist(s)	(New Caledonia) ACB Poya
4	(French Polynesia) AS Excelsior
5	(New Zealand) Canterbury Region
6	(Wallis and Futuna) HB Kafika
