= Oceania Women's Handball Champions Cup =

The Oceania Handball Champions Cup is an international club championship featuring teams from the Oceania region.

== Champions ==
Year	Venue	Final		
Year	Venue	Winner	Score	Runner-up
2007	New Caledonia	(New Caledonia) ACB Poya	unknown	(New Caledonia) CS Sinoj
2008	Tahiti	(French Polynesia) AS Dragon	unknown	unknown
2009	New Caledonia	(New Caledonia) ACB Poya	29–27	(French Polynesia) AS Dragon
2010	Tahiti	(French Polynesia) AS Dragon	29–21	(New Caledonia) AS Dumbea
2011-2016	no tiles held			
2017	Geelong, Australia	(New Caledonia) AS Dumbea	27–26	(Australia) Melbourne HC
2018	Geelong, Australia	(Australia) Melbourne HC	18–13	(Australia) University of Queensland
2019	Gold Coast, Australia	(Australia) University of Queensland	18–11	(Australia) Melbourne HC
2020	Cancelled due to COVID-19			
2021	Gold Coast, Australia	(Australia) Canberra HC	Round robin	(Australia) University of Technology Sydney
2022	Gold Coast, Australia	(Australia) Sydney University	28-15	(Australia) Melbourne HC

== Club performance ==
Rank	Club	Starts	Won	R/U	Third	Other
1	(French Polynesia) AS Dragon	4	2	1	1	0
=	(New Caledonia) ACB Poya	3	2	0	1	0
3	(New Caledonia) AS Dumbea	1	1	0	1	0
4	(Australia) Melbourne FC	1	0	1	0	0
=	(New Caledonia) CS Sinoj	1	0	1	0	0
6	(Australia) University of Technology Sydney	1	0	0	1	0
7	(Wallis and Futuna) HB Kafika	2	0	0	0	2
=	(New Zealand) Canterbury Region	2	0	0	0	2
=	(New Zealand) Auckland Region	2	0	0	0	2
=	(French Polynesia) AS Excelsior	1	0	0	0	1
=	(New Caledonia) JS Mont Dore	1	0	0	0	1
=	(French Polynesia) Tiare Anani	1	0	0	0	1
=	(Australia) Deakin/Southside	1	0	0	0	1
=	(Australia) Sydney University	1	0	0	0	1
=	(Australia) Monash University	1	0	0	0	1

== Titles by nations ==
Rank	Country	Champion	Runner up
1	Australia	4	5
2	New Caledonia	3	1
3	Tahiti	2	1

== See also ==
- Oceania Continent Handball Federation
- Oceania Men's Handball Champions Cup
