= Hamou Boutlélis Sports Palace =

Indoor sports arena in Oran, Algeria

Coordinates: 35.6903°N 0.6465°W

- Palais des Sports
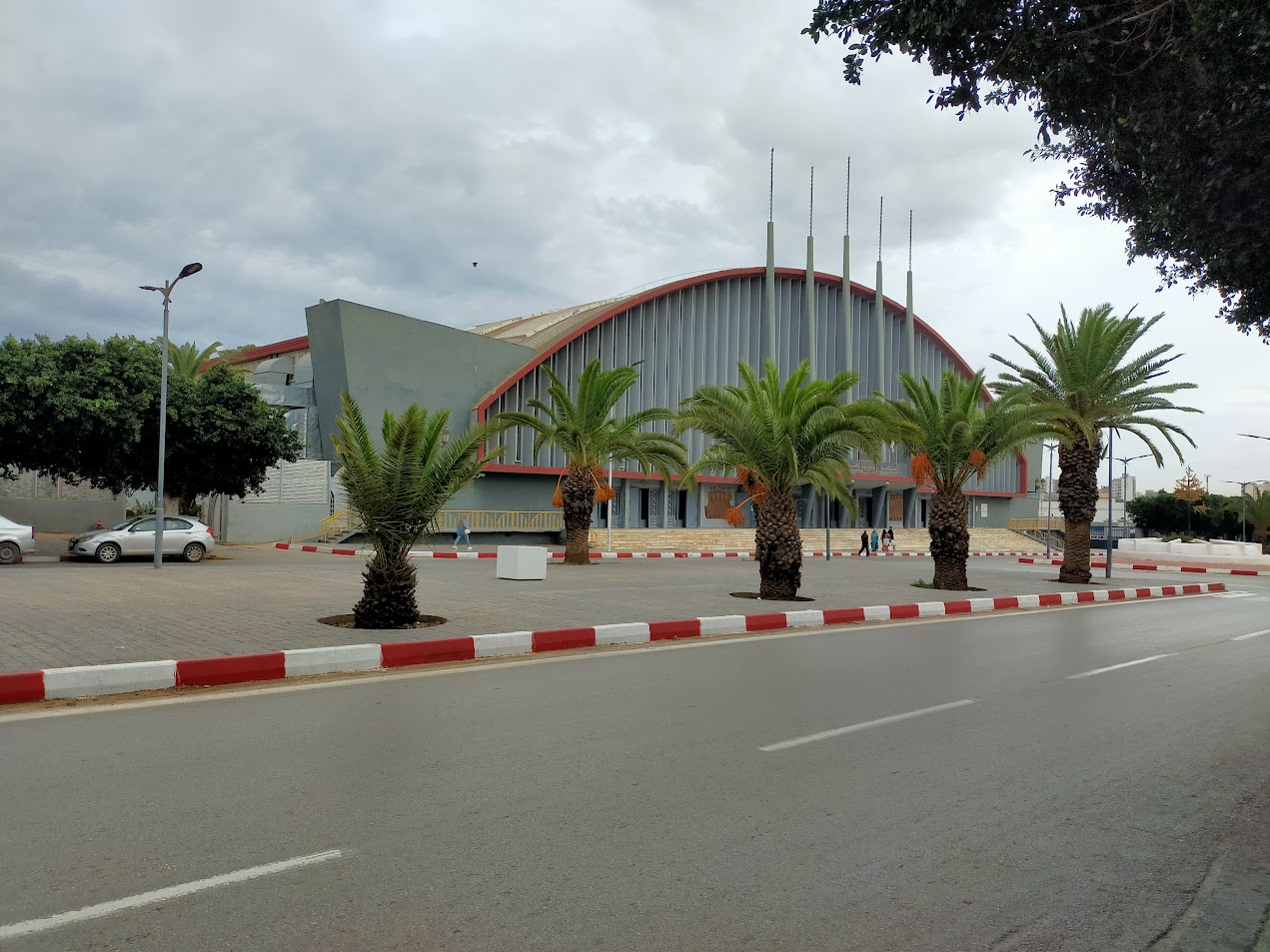
- Interactive map of Hamou Boutlélis Sports Palace
- Full name: Hamou Boutlélis Sports Palace
- Location: Oran, Algeria
- Operator: OPOW of Oran
- Capacity: 5,000

Construction
- Opened: December 1960; 65 years ago
- Renovated: 2002

Tenants
- MC Oran; ASM Oran

The Hamou Boutlélis Sports Palace (Arabic: قصر الرياضة حمو بوتليليس), famously called Palais des Sports (Arabic: قصر الرياضات), is an indoor sports arena located in Oran, Algeria. The official seating capacity of the arena is 5,000.

== History ==
The hall was opened in December 1960 in Medina Jedida, a neighborhood of Oran under the French Algeria period. It hosted many events, the most important were the 1988 African Handball Cup Winners' Cup, the 2005 FIVB Volleyball Boys' U19 World Championship and the qualification tournament of the 2012 FIVB World Grand Prix.

== Sports hosted ==
=== Collective sports ===
Futsal, Handball, Basket-ball, Volley-ball.

=== Individual sports ===
Martial arts (Karate, Judo, Kickboxing ...etc.), Boxing, Gymnastic.

== See also ==
- Miloud Hadefi Complex Omnisport Arena
