= AS Dumbea (handball) =

Association Sportive Dumbea is a handball club in New Caledonia

- Full name: Association Sportive Dumbea
- League: FFHB Ligue De Handball Nouvelle Caledonie
- Club colours
Home	Away

The Association Sportive Dumbea is a handball club in New Caledonia.

== Records ==
=== Men ===
- Oceania Handball Champions Cup - 2 titles

Winners - 2008, 2010
Runners-up - 2006
Third - 2007, 2009, 2015

=== Women ===
- Oceania Women's Handball Champions Cup

Winners - 2017
Runners-up - 2010

- Australian Handball Club Championship

Winners - 2017

== See also ==
- Oceania Handball Champions Cup
- Oceania Women's Handball Champions Cup
