= Miloud Hadefi Complex Omnisport Arena =

Sports venue in Algeria

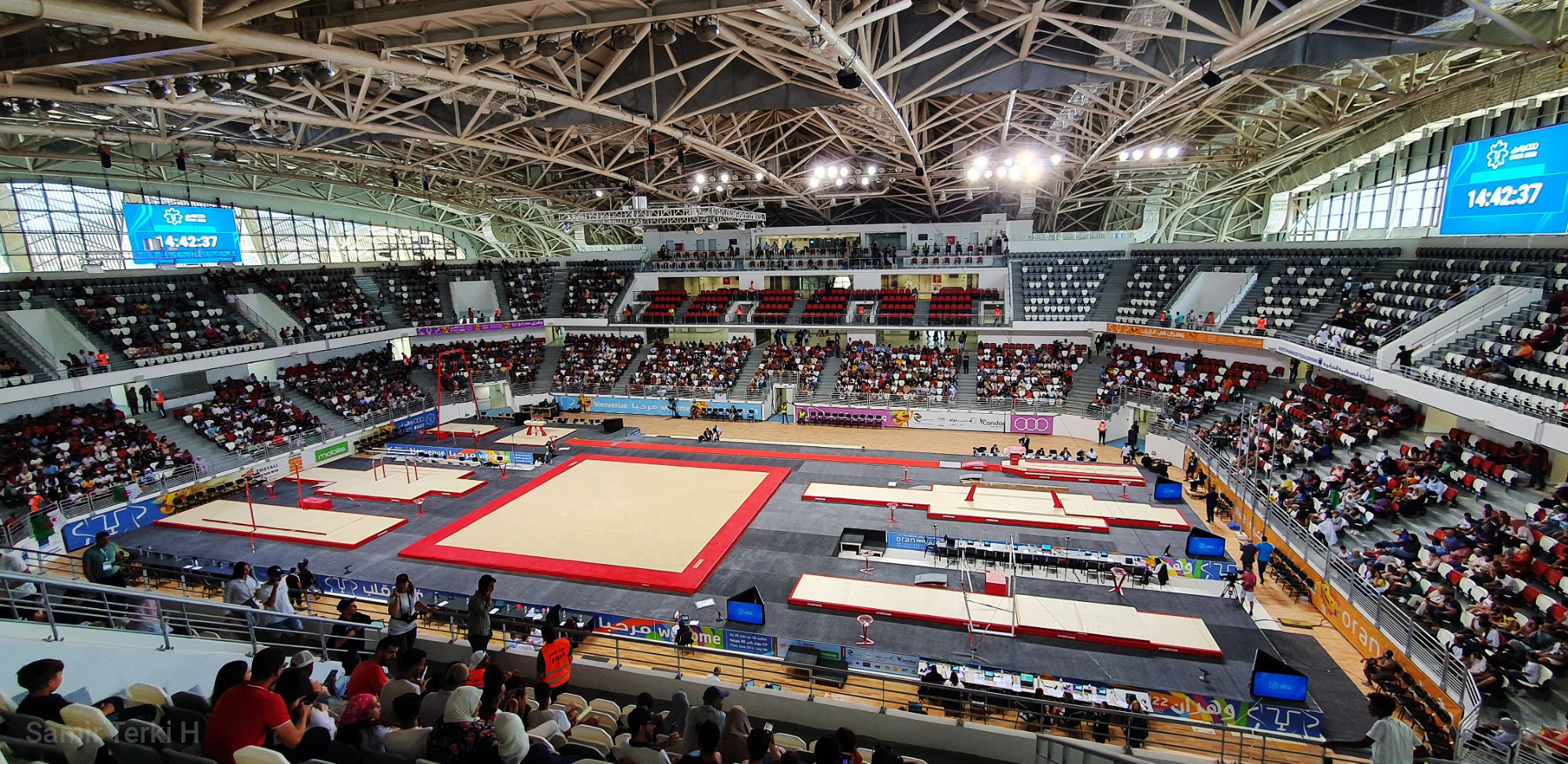
- The Arena during the 2022 Mediterranean Games
- Interactive map of Miloud Hadefi Complex Omnisport Arena
- Full name: Miloud Hadefi Olympic Complex Omnisport Arena
- Location: Bir El Djir, Oran, Algeria
- Coordinates: 35.7298°N 0.5468°W
- Operator: OPOW of Oran
- Capacity: 7,000

Construction
- Opened: 23 June 2022

Tenant
- MC Oran

The Miloud Hadefi Olympic Complex Omnisport Arena (Arabic: قاعة متعددة الرياضات للمركب الأولمبي ميلود هدفي), is an indoor sports arena located in Bir El Djir, a suburb of Oran, Algeria. The official seating capacity of the arena is 7,000 and it's a part of the Miloud Hadefi Olympic Complex.

== History ==
The hall was opened on 23 June 2022 by the Algerian president Abdelmadjid Tebboune. It hosted many events, such as the 2022 Mediterranean Games and the 2023 Arab Games.

The first match was played on 4 July 2022 between Spain women's handball team and Portugal women's handball team in semifinal of the 2022 Mediterranean Games Handball tournament.

== Sports hosted ==
Basket-ball, Handball, Futsal, Volley-ball.

== Notable events ==
The Arena hosts some national and international tournaments :

- 2022 Mediterranean Games (Artistic & Rhythmic gymnastics and Handball)
- 2022 Arab Gymnastics Championships
- 2023 Arab Games (Gymnastics and Handball)
- 2023 Algerian Men's Handball Cup final.

== See also ==
- Miloud Hadefi Stadium
- Miloud Hadefi Complex Aquatic Center
- Hamou Boutlélis Sports Palace
