= UniSport Nationals =

Annual multi-sport Australian event

- Formerly: Australian University Games (1993–2017)
- Founded: 1993; 33 years ago
- Organizing body: UniSport
- No. of teams: 43
- Country: Australia
- Headquarters: Brisbane
- Website: unisport.com.au/nationals
- 2025 UniSport Nationals

The UniSport Nationals is a multi-sport event held annually between the 43 Australian universities and tertiary institutions. Overseen by UniSport, the peak governing body of university sport in Australia, the nationals is the flagship event on the university sporting calendar and attracts over 6,000 student athletes each year. The nationals consist of Division 1, Division 2 and a smaller number of standalone sporting competitions held throughout the year.

== History ==
Uni Games logo, 2017.

The inaugural Australian University Games were held in Brisbane in 1993. The 2015 Australian University Games hosted in Gold Coast was the largest in its history, with more than 8,000 student athletes competing across 32 sports.

The University of Sydney has been the most successful amongst competing universities in the Australian University Games, having achieved "Overall Champion" a total of nine times (1995–1996, 1999–2003, 2007, 2014). The University of Western Australia became the first University outside the big 3 (the University of Sydney, the University of Melbourne, and Monash University) to win the overall champion title since 1994, when it clinched the 2010 title. The final Australian University Games concluded in 2017 with the University of Technology Sydney, claiming their second overall champion title. The UniSport Nationals replaced the Australian University Games from 2018 onwards.

Currently 31 of the sports are included in the main national championships event, which rotates between Perth and the Gold Coast in its location. The remaining national unisport championships are held as standalone championships through the year, often as part of partner events hosted by universities.

While these championships are usually held annually, the 2020 and 2021 events that were set to take place on the Gold Coast were cancelled due to the impacts of the coronavirus pandemic. Along with its main national championships, UniSport Australia also cancelled the standalone championships throughout 2020. The event returned successfully in 2022 in Perth.

In July 2022, UniSport Australia announced that they would be adopting the National Integrity Framework, and associated integrity policies, after forming a partnership with Sport Integrity Australia.

== Member universities ==
Institution	Region	Location
Australian Catholic University (ACU)	South, East, North	Ballarat, Brisbane, Canberra, Melbourne, Sydney
Australian College of Physical Education (ACPE)	East	Sydney; New South Wales
Australian Defence Force Academy (ADFA)	East	Canberra; Australian Capital Territory
Australian National University (ANU)	East	Canberra; Australian Capital Territory
Avondale University (AVON)	East	Lake Macquarie; New South Wales
Bond University (BOND)	North	Gold Coast; Queensland
Central Queensland University (CQU)	North	Bundaberg, Gladstone, Mackay, Rockhampton, Brisbane; Queensland
Charles Darwin University (CDU)	North	Darwin; Northern Territory
Charles Sturt University (CSU)	East	Albury-Wodonga, Bathurst, Dubbo, Orange, Manly, Wagga Wagga; New South Wales
Curtin University (CURT)	West	Perth; Western Australia
Deakin University (DEAK)	South	Geelong, Melbourne, Warrnambool; Victoria
Edith Cowan University (ECU)	West	Perth; Western Australia
Federation University Australia (FED)	South	Ballarat, Churchill, Berwick, Horsham; Victoria
Flinders University (FU)	South	Adelaide; South Australia
Griffith University (GU)	North	Brisbane, Gold Coast; Queensland
International College of Management, Sydney (ICMS)	East	Sydney; New South Wales
James Cook University (JCU)	North	Cairns, Townsville; Queensland
La Trobe University (LTU)	South	Albury-Wodonga, Bendigo, Melbourne; Victoria
Macquarie University (MQU)	East	Sydney; New South Wales
Monash University (MON)	South	Melbourne; Victoria
Murdoch University (MDU)	West	Perth; Western Australia
Queensland University of Technology (QUT)	North	Brisbane; Queensland
RMIT University (RMIT)	South	Melbourne; Victoria
Southern Cross University (SCU)	East	Lismore; New South Wales
Swinburne University of Technology (SUT)	South	Melbourne; Victoria
The University of Adelaide (AU)	South	Adelaide; South Australia
The University of Melbourne (MELB)	South	Melbourne; Victoria
The University of New England (UNE)	North	Armidale; New South Wales
University of Newcastle (NCLE)	East	Newcastle; New South Wales
The University of Notre Dame Australia (UNDA)	West	Perth; Western Australia
The University of Queensland (UQ)	North	Brisbane; Queensland
The University of Sydney (USYD)	East	Sydney; New South Wales
The University of Western Australia (UWA)	West	Perth; Western Australia
Torrens University Australia (TUA)	South, North, East	Adelaide, Brisbane, Melbourne, Sydney
University of Canberra (UC)	East	Canberra; Australian Capital Territory
University of New South Wales (UNSW)	East	Sydney; New South Wales
University of South Australia (USA)	South	Adelaide; South Australia
University of Southern Queensland (USQ)	North	Toowoomba; Queensland
University of Tasmania (TU)	South	Hobart, Launceston; Tasmania
University of Technology Sydney (UTS)	East	Sydney; New South Wales
University of the Sunshine Coast (USC)	North	Sunshine Coast; Queensland
University of Western Sydney (UWS)	East	Sydney; New South Wales
University of Wollongong (UOW)	East	Wollongong; New South Wales
Victoria University, Australia (VU)	South	Melbourne; Victoria

== Map of host cities ==
Host cities of Australian University Games (1993–2017) and UniSport Nationals (2018–present)

== Results ==
Overall Champion

The university with the most pennants across all sports is awarded the Overall Champion Trophy.

Per Capita Champion

The university with the highest points based on performance and enrolment numbers is awarded the Doug Ellis Per Capita Trophy.

Spirit Champion

The university that has shown the best sportsmanship is awarded John White Spirit Trophy.

=== Table of Results ===
Year	Host city	Host University	Overall Champion University	Per Capita Champion University	Spirit Champion University
1993	Brisbane	The University of Queensland	The University of Queensland	Charles Sturt University	University of Western Sydney
1994	Wollongong	University of Wollongong	University of Wollongong	University of Wollongong	University of Ballarat
1995	Darwin	Northern Territory University	The University of Sydney	Northern Territory University	University of Technology Sydney
1996	Canberra	Australian National University; University of Canberra	The University of Sydney	Deakin University - Burwood	Deakin University - Burwood
1997	Melbourne	La Trobe University	The University of Melbourne	Deakin University - Burwood	Deakin University - Burwood
1998	Melbourne	Monash University; The University of Melbourne	Monash University	University of Ballarat	The University of Western Australia
1999	Perth	Curtin University of Technology; Edith Cowan University; Murdoch University; The University of Notre Dame Australia; The University of Western Australia	The University of Sydney	Charles Sturt University - Mitchell	The University of New England
2000	Ballarat	University of Ballarat	The University of Sydney	University of Ballarat	The University of New South Wales
2001	Sydney	The University of Sydney	The University of Sydney	Charles Sturt University - Bathurst	The University of Western Australia
2002	Adelaide	The University of Adelaide; University of South Australia; Flinders University	The University of Sydney	University of Ballarat	Charles Sturt University - Bathurst
2003	Newcastle	The University of Newcastle	The University of Sydney	University of Ballarat	Australian Defence Force Academy
2004	Perth	Curtin University of Technology; Edith Cowan University; Murdoch University; The University of Notre Dame Australia; The University of Western Australia	The University of Melbourne	University of Ballarat	Curtin University of Technology
2005	Brisbane	Griffith University	The University of Melbourne	Macquarie University	Queensland University of Technology
2006	Adelaide	The University of Adelaide; University of South Australia; Flinders University	The University of Melbourne	The University of Adelaide	Victoria University
2007	Gold Coast	Griffith University - Gold Coast	The University of Sydney	Australian College of Physical Education	Charles Sturt University
2008	Melbourne	Monash University; Victoria University	Monash University	The University of New England	Griffith University
2009	Gold Coast	Bond University	Monash University	Bond University	The University of Queensland
2010	Perth	The University of Western Australia	The University of Western Australia	The University of Notre Dame Australia	RMIT University
2011	Gold Coast		The University of Sydney	Bond University	Murdoch University
2012	Adelaide		The University of Melbourne	The University of Western Australia	RMIT University
2013	Gold Coast		The University of Melbourne	Bond University	Queensland University of Technology
2014	Sydney		The University of Sydney	Bond University	Edith Cowan University
2015	Gold Coast		The University of Sydney	Bond University	The University of Western Australia
2016	Perth		University of Technology Sydney	The University of Western Australia	Monash University
2017	Gold Coast		University of Technology Sydney	Bond University	Macquarie University
2018	Gold Coast		The University of Queensland	Bond University	RMIT University
2019	Gold Coast		The University of Sydney	Bond University	RMIT University
2020	Gold Coast	Cancelled			
2021	Gold Coast	Cancelled			
2022	Perth	Curtin University; University of Western Australia	University of Sydney	Bond University	Western Sydney University
2023	Gold Coast	Southern Cross University	University of Sydney	Bond University	Western Sydney University
2024	Canberra	University of Canberra; Australian National University	University of Sydney	Bond University	Australian National University
2025	Gold Coast		University of Sydney	University of Technology Sydney	University of Melbourne

== Sports Trophies ==
=== 3x3 Basketball ===
==== Men ====
Year		Gold	Silver	Bronze	4th
2018		Macquarie University	RMIT University	University of Technology Sydney	The University of Sydney
2019		Macquarie University	The University of Newcastle	Monash University	University of Technology Sydney
2021		University of Technology Sydney	Macquarie University	Monash University	RMIT University
2022		Macquarie University	University of Technology Sydney	RMIT University	Deakin University
2023	Div 1	The University of Sydney	Monash University	Macquarie University	Western Sydney University
2023	Div 2	Macquarie University	Western Sydney University	UNSW Sydney	Edith Cowan University
2024	Div 1	University of Canterbury (NZ)	The University of Sydney	Macquarie University	Deakin University
2024	Div 2	Victoria University	The University of Sydney	Macquarie University	Charles Sturt University
2025	Div 1	The University of Melbourne	The University of Sydney	Macquarie University	La Trobe University
2025	Div 2	Monash University	The University of Sydney	University of Sydney Technology	Macquarie University

==== Women ====
Year		Gold	Silver	Bronze	4th
2018		Monash University	University of Technology Sydney	The University of Melbourne	The University of New South Wales
2019		University of Technology Sydney	Monash University	The University of Sydney	Deakin University
2021		Monash University	The University of New South Wales	University of Wollongong	The Australian National University
2022		University of Technology Sydney	La Trobe University	RMIT University	Macquarie University
2023	Div 1	University of Sydney	University of Wollongong	Macquarie University	University of Technology Sydney
2023	Div 2	UNSW Sydney	Monash University	Macquarie University	Western Sydney University
2024	Div 1	University of Sydney	La Trobe University	University of Waikato (NZ)	Victoria University
2024	Div 2	University of Sydney	University of the Sunshine Coast	Monash University	Charles Sturt University
2025	Div 1	University of Tasmania	University of Sydney	La Trobe University	University of Technology Sydney
2025	Div 2	University of Sydney	Charles Sturt University	Monash University	University of the Sunshine Coast

=== Athletics ===
==== Overall ====
Year	Gold	Silver	Bronze	4th
2005	The University of Queensland	The University of Sydney	Monash University	Australian College of Physical Education
2006	The University of Queensland	The University of Melbourne	The University of Sydney	Australian College of Physical Education
2007	The University of Queensland	The University of Sydney	The University of Melbourne	Monash University
2008	The University of Queensland	Monash University	The University of Melbourne	The University of Sydney
2009	The University of Queensland	Monash University	The University of Sydney	The University of Melbourne
2010	The University of Sydney	Monash University	The University of Western Australia	Edith Cowan University
2018	The University of Queensland	University of Technology Sydney	Queensland University of Technology	Monash University
2019	The University of Sydney	The University of Melbourne	University of Technology Sydney	University of New South Wales

==== Men ====
QLD Licensed Vietuallers Asc. IV Athletics Trophy

Year	Gold	Silver	Bronze	4th
2005	The University of Queensland	Monash University	University of Technology Sydney	The University of Sydney
2006	The University of Queensland	The University of Sydney	The University of Melbourne	Australian College of Physical Education
2007	The University of Queensland	The University of Sydney	Monash University	Queensland University of Technology
2008	Monash University	The University of Queensland	The University of Melbourne	Victoria University
2009	Monash University	The University of Queensland	The University of Sydney	University of Western Sydney
2010	The University of Sydney	Edith Cowan University	Monash University	The University of Melbourne
2011	The University of Sydney	Monash University	The University of Queensland	University of Tasmania
2012	The University of Sydney	University of Sunshine Coast	Macquarie University	The University of Adelaide
2013	The University of Sydney	The University of Melbourne	University of Technology Sydney	Monash University
2014	The University of Sydney	University of Technology Sydney	The University of Melbourne	Monash University
2015	The University of Sydney	University of Technology Sydney	Monash University	University of New South Wales
2016	University of Technology Sydney	The University of Sydney	The University of Melbourne	University of New South Wales
2017	University of Technology Sydney	The University of Queensland	University of New South Wales	The University of Sydney
2018	The University of Queensland	University of Technology Sydney	Queensland University of Technology	Monash University
2019	The University of Sydney	University of Technology Sydney	Macquarie University	La Trobe University
2021	University of Technology Sydney	The University of Sydney	Queensland University of Technology	The University of Melbourne
2022	The University of Sydney	Queensland University of Technology	University of Technology Sydney	Australian Catholic University
2023	The University of Queensland	The University of Sydney	Queensland University of Technology	Australian Catholic University
2024	The University of Sydney	The University of Queensland	University of Technology Sydney	UNSW Sydney
2025	The University of Sydney	University of Technology Sydney	The University of Melbourne; University of New South Wales	

==== Women ====
The G.R. Hulbert Trophy

Year	Gold	Silver	Bronze	4th
2005	The University of Queensland	The University of Sydney	The University of Melbourne	Monash University
2006	The University of Queensland	The University of Melbourne	The University of Sydney	Australian College of Physical Education
2007	The University of Queensland	The University of Melbourne	Griffith University	The University of Sydney
2008	The University of Queensland	The University of Melbourne	The University of Sydney	Monash University
2009	The University of Queensland	Queensland University of Technology	The University of Melbourne	The University of Sydney
2010	The University of Sydney	The University of Western Australia	Monash University	Curtin University of Technology
2011	The University of Queensland	The University of Sydney	The University of Melbourne	Monash University
2012	The University of Sydney	The University of Queensland	The University of Melbourne	The University of Western Australia
2013	The University of Sydney	RMIT University	University of Technology Sydney	The University of Melbourne
2014	The University of Sydney	The University of Melbourne	RMIT University	University of Newcastle
2015	The University of Sydney	Deakin University	Griffith University	University of New South Wales
2016	The University of Sydney	University of Technology Sydney	The University of Melbourne	University of New South Wales
2017	The University of Sydney	University of New South Wales	University of Technology Sydney	The University of Melbourne
2018	The University of Queensland	University of Technology Sydney	Queensland University of Technology	Monash University
2019	The University of Sydney	The University of Melbourne	University of Technology Sydney	University of New South Wales
2021	The University of Sydney	University of Technology Sydney	The University of Melbourne	University of New South Wales Sydney
2022	The University of Sydney	Griffith University	Macquarie University	University of New South Wales
2023	The University of Sydney	Australian Catholic University	Macquarie University	Queensland University of Technology
2024	The University of Sydney	Griffith University	The University of Queensland	Australian Catholic University
2025	The University of Sydney	Griffith University	University of Technology Sydney	University of New South Wales

=== Australian Football ===
==== Men - Division One ====
The E.J Hartung Cup Intervarsity is Awarded to the Winning Men's Football Team

Year	Gold	Silver	Bronze	4th
1999	Deakin University	The University of Melbourne		
2000	The University of Melbourne	Deakin University		
2001	The University of Melbourne	Monash University		
2002	The University of Melbourne	Deakin University		
2003	The University of Melbourne			
2004	Australian Catholic University	The University of Melbourne		
2005	The University of Melbourne	Deakin University	The University of Western Australia	Monash University
2006	The University of Adelaide	The University of Western Australia	The University of Melbourne	Deakin University
2007	Monash University	The University of Melbourne	The University of Western Australia	Australian Catholic University
2008	The University of Melbourne	Monash University	La Trobe University	The University of Western Australia
2009	The University of Melbourne	Monash University	La Trobe University	The University of Western Australia
2010	The University of Western Australia	Edith Cowan University	Monash University	Victoria University
2011	The University of Western Australia	Monash University	Murdoch University	Australian Catholic University
2012	The University of Melbourne	The University of Western Australia	The University of Adelaide	Monash University
2013	The University of Western Australia	The University of Melbourne	Murdoch University	University of Ballarat
2014	The University of Melbourne	The University of Western Australia	RMIT University	Federation University
2015	The University of Western Australia	The University of Melbourne	RMIT University	Monash University
2016	The University of Western Australia	Deakin University	Australian Catholic University	Edith Cowan University
2017	Federation University Australia	Deakin University	Edith Cowan University	Australian Catholic University
2018	Federation University Australia	The University of Sydney	University of Tasmania	Deakin University
2019	Federation University Australia	Torrens University Australia	Australian Catholic University	University of New South Wales

==== Men - Division Two ====
Year	Gold	Silver	Bronze	4th
2008	Victoria University	Swinburne University of Technology	Australian Catholic University	University of Ballarat
2009	Australian Catholic University	Edith Cowan University	Griffith University	Bond University
2010	No Competition			

==== Women ====
Year	Gold	Silver	Bronze	4th
2005	The University of Melbourne	Australian Catholic University	Australian Defence Force Academy	Deakin University
2006	Australian Catholic University	Deakin University	The University of Melbourne	La Trobe University
2007	Monash University	Deakin University	The University of Western Australia	University of Ballarat
2008	University of Ballarat	Monash University	Victoria University	La Trobe University
2009	University of Ballarat	La Trobe University	Monash University	Victoria University
2010	Victoria University	Edith Cowan University	Monash University	Murdoch University
2012	RMIT University	Monash University	Victoria University	Australian Catholic University
2019	The University of Melbourne	Deakin University	Torrens University	Australian Catholic University

==== Mixed AFL 9s ====
Year	Gold	Silver	Bronze	4th
2023	The University of Sydney	The University of Sydney 2	Bond University	
2024	University of Technology Sydney	Victoria University	University of the Sunshine Coast	Charles Sturt University
2025	University of Technology Sydney	Australian National University	University of Sydney	Victoria University

=== Badminton ===
==== Men Division 1 ====
Year	Gold	Silver	Bronze	4th
2005	University of New South Wales	Queensland University of Technology	Monash University	Swinburne University of Technology
2006	Curtin University of Technology	The University of Melbourne	Monash University	The University of Adelaide
2007	The University of Sydney	The University of Melbourne	Monash University	The University of Adelaide
2008	Monash University	The University of Melbourne	The University of Western Australia	The University of Sydney
2009	The University of Melbourne	The University of Sydney	University of Technology Sydney	Monash University
2010	The University of Sydney	The University of Western Australia	The University of Queensland	Monash University
2012	The University of Melbourne	Monash University	The University of Sydney	University of South Australia
2013	The University of Melbourne	Monash University	The University of Sydney	The University of Queensland
2014	The University of Melbourne	Monash University	The University of Sydney	Curtin University
2015	Australian National University	The University of Melbourne	Monash University	University of New South Wales
2016	Monash University	The University of Melbourne	The University of Sydney	The University of Western Australia
2017	Monash University	The University of Melbourne	The University of Sydney	The University of Queensland
2018	Monash University	The University of Queensland	The University of Melbourne	The University of Sydney
2019	Monash University	University of New South Wales	The University of Queensland	The University of Melbourne
2022	Curtin University	University of New South Wales	The University of Melbourne	Monash University
2023	Monash University	RMIT University	The University of Sydney	Deakin University
2024	UNSW Sydney	Deakin University	Monash University	The University of Sydney
2025	Monash University	University of New South Wales	The University of Melbourne	University of Technology Sydney

==== Women ====
Year	Gold	Silver	Bronze	4th
2005	University of New South Wales	The University of Melbourne	Monash University	The University of Sydney
2006	University of Technology Sydney	Monash University	The University of Melbourne	The University of Sydney
2007	Monash University	University of New South Wales	The University of Western Australia	The University of Melbourne
2008	Monash University	Victoria University	The University of Western Australia	The University of Sydney
2009	The University of Melbourne	The University of Sydney	Macquarie University	The University of Western Australia
2010	Monash University	Curtin University of Technology	The University of Melbourne	The University of Western Australia
2012	The University of Sydney	Monash University	The University of Melbourne	The University of Adelaide
2013	The University of Melbourne	The University of Sydney	Monash University	University of New South Wales
2014	The University of Melbourne	Monash University	The University of Sydney	Macquarie University
2015	Macquarie University	Monash University	The University of Sydney	University of New South Wales
2016	The University of Sydney	Monash University	The University of Melbourne	Curtin University
2017	The University of Melbourne	Monash University	The University of Sydney	University of New South Wales
2018	The University of Melbourne	Monash University	The University of Sydney	University of New South Wales
2019	The University of Melbourne	The University of Sydney	University of New South Wales	The University of Queensland
2022	The University of Melbourne	University of New South Wales	The University of Western Australia	The University of Queensland
2023	Monash University	The University of Queensland	University of New South Wales	The University of Sydney
2024	The University of Melbourne	Monash University	University of Technology Sydney	The University of Queensland
2025	University of New South Wales	The University of Queensland	Monash University	Macquarie University

==== Men Division 2 ====
Year	Gold	Silver	Bronze	4th
2018	Griffith University	Deakin University	University of Tasmania	The University of Newcastle
2022	The Australian National University	RMIT University	Queensland University of Technology	Deakin University

=== Baseball ===
Australian Universities Championship Series

Year	Gold	Silver	Bronze	4th
1994	University of Newcastle	The University of Melbourne	University of Wollongong	University of New South Wales
2004	Edith Cowan University	Monash University	University of Wollongong	University of Western Australia
2005	Queensland University of Technology	The University of Melbourne	Macquarie University	University of New South Wales
2006	The University of Sydney	Monash University	The University of Western Australia	Macquarie University
2007	The University of Western Australia	Macquarie University	The University of Melbourne	Monash University
2008	The University of Melbourne	The University of Sydney	Macquarie University	Victoria University
2009	The University of Sydney	Griffith University	Monash University	Macquarie University
2010	The University of Sydney	Monash University	The University of Melbourne	The University of Western Australia
2011	Monash University	University of Queensland	Griffith University	The University of Sydney
2012	The University of Melbourne	University of Newcastle	Monash University	The University of New South Wales
2013	The University of Melbourne	Monash University	Griffith University	La Trobe University
2014	The University of Sydney	Monash University	The University of Melbourne	University of Newcastle
2015	Griffith University	The University of Sydney	Queensland University of Technology	Monash University
2016	The University of Melbourne	Griffith University	The University of Sydney	University of Newcastle
2017	Griffith University	Queensland University of Technology	The University of Sydney	University of Newcastle
2018	The University of Sydney	Griffith University	University of Technology Sydney	Queensland University of Technology
2019	University of Newcastle	The University of Queensland	The University of Sydney	The University of Melbourne

=== Basketball ===
==== Men ====
AUSA Men's Basketball Shield

Year	Division	Gold	Silver	Bronze	4th
1994		University of Ballarat	University of New South Wales	--	--
1995		Central Queensland University	University of Ballarat	--	--
1996		University of Canberra	University of Melbourne	--	--
2005		Macquarie University	Griffith University	Deakin University	University of Newcastle
2006		University of Newcastle	RMIT University	The University of Adelaide	Deakin University
2007		Monash University	Deakin University	Griffith University	University of Newcastle
2008		Monash University	La Trobe University	Macquarie University	University of Technology, Sydney
2009		The University of Queensland	The University of Melbourne	Griffith University	Macquarie University
2010		The University of Melbourne	Griffith University	The University of Western Australia	Monash University
2011		Griffith University	The University of Sydney	The University of Western Australia	The University of Melbourne
2012		Monash University	The University of Melbourne	Sydney University	Victoria University
2013		Monash University	The University of Melbourne	The University of Western Australia	The University of Sydney
2014		The University of Western Australia	Monash University	Macquarie University	The University of Melbourne
2015		Macquarie University	Western Sydney University	Deakin University	University of Technology Sydney
2016		The University of Western Australia	Victoria University	University of Technology Sydney	Monash University
2017		University of New South Wales	RMIT University	Victoria University	La Trobe University
2018		Victoria University	RMIT University	The University of Melbourne	Macquarie University
2019		The University of Adelaide	La Trobe University	RMIT University	Macquarie University
2022	Div 1	La Trobe University	Monash University	Victoria University	RMIT University
2022	Div 2	University of Wollongong	Avondale University College	University of Canberra	Western Sydney University
2023	Div 1	La Trobe University	The University of Adelaide	RMIT University	University of Technology Sydney
2023	Div 2	Avondale University	Victoria University	University of New South Wales	Macquarie University
2024	Div 1	University of Tasmania	Monash University	The University of Melbourne	Macquarie University
2024	Div 2	Deakin University	Federation University	University of Wollongong	Swinburne University of Technology
2025	Div 1	The University of Melbourne	Macquarie University	Monash University	University of New South Wales
2025	Div 2	Deakin University	Swinburne University of Technology	Federation University	Griffith University

==== Women ====
Year	Division	Gold	Silver	Bronze	4th
2005		University of Western Sydney	University of New South Wales	La Trobe University	Deakin University
2006		The University of Adelaide	University of New South Wales	Queensland University of Technology	Deakin University
2007		Queensland University of Technology	Deakin University	University of New South Wales	Griffith University
2008		Monash University	University of New South Wales	The University of Melbourne	Victoria University
2009		Monash University	University of New South Wales	The University of Melbourne	Griffith University
2010		The University of Sydney	Monash University	Deakin University	Victoria University
2022	Div 1	Victoria University	The University of Sydney	Monash University	University of Technology Sydney
2022	Div 2	Federation University	Edith Cowan University	Griffith University	Southern Cross University
2023	Div 1	La Trobe University	The University of Melbourne	Deakin University	The University of Sydney
2023	Div 2	Australian Catholic University	Queensland University of Technology	The University of Adelaide	The University of Queensland
2024		The University of Melbourne	Monash University	University of Technology Sydney	The University of Queensland
2025	Div 1	Deakin University	Monash University	University of South Australia	La Trobe University
2025	Div 2	RMIT University	Griffith University	The University of Queensland	Australia National University

=== Beach Volleyball ===
==== Overall ====
Year	Gold	Silver	Bronze	4th
2005	Griffith University; The University of Queensland		Queensland University of Technology	University of Newcastle
2006	Bond University	The University of Melbourne	Monash University	Queensland University of Technology
2007	Queensland University of Technology	Deakin University	Monash University	The University of Adelaide
2008	Murdoch University	Edith Cowan University	Monash University	The University of Western Australia
2009	Griffith University	Edith Cowan University	Flinders University	Murdoch University
2010	Edith Cowan University	RMIT University	Queensland University of Technology	Deakin University

==== Men ====
Year	Division	Gold	Silver	Bronze	4th
2005		The University of Queensland	Queensland University of Technology	Griffith University 1	Griffith University 2
2006		Queensland University of Technology 2	Queensland University of Technology 3	The University of Queensland	Griffith University - Gold Coast
2007		Queensland University of Technology	RMIT University	University of Newcastle	Bond University
2008		Murdoch University	Edith Cowan University	University of Newcastle	The University of Queensland
2009		Griffith University	Edith Cowan University	Flinders University	Murdoch University
2010		Edith Cowan University	RMIT University	Deakin University	Queensland University of Technology
2019		The University of Sydney	The University of Western Australia	The University of Queensland	Monash University
2022	Div 1	The University of Adelaide	Curtin University	Griffith University	James Cook University
2022	Div 2	University of Notre Dame Australia	University of Sunshine Coast	Adelaide University 2	Murdoch University
2023	Div 1	Curtin University	Griffith University	RMIT University	Western Sydney University
2023	Div 2	Griffith University 2	The University of Adelaide 2	University of Notre Dame Australia	The University of Adelaide
2024		RMIT University	The University of Adelaide	Victoria University	The University of Queensland
2025	Div 1	Queensland University of Technology	The University of Queensland 2	University of Wollongong	Griffith University
2025	Div 2	University of Technology Sydney	Griffith University 2	University of Western Sydney	University of the Sunshine Coast

==== Women ====
Year	Division	Gold	Silver	Bronze	4th
2005		Griffith University 1	Griffith University 2	RMIT University 1	University of the Sunshine Coast
2006		Queensland University of Technology 2	Queensland University of Technology 4	Queensland University of Technology 1	Queensland University of Technology 3
2007		Queensland University of Technology	Monash University	Curtin University of Technology	Deakin University
2008		Bond University	Murdoch University	Edith Cowan University	Queensland University of Technology
2009		The University of Queensland	Bond University	Murdoch University	Queensland University of Technology
2010		Edith Cowan University	Griffith University	Murdoch University	Curtin University of Technology
2019		The University of Queensland	Queensland University of Technology	University of Sunshine Coast	RMIT University
2022		University of Western Australia	James Cook University	Griffith University	The University of Adelaide 2
2023	Div 1	La Trobe University	James Cook University	Grififth University	University of Canberra
2023	Div 2	Flinders University	The University of Adelaide	University of Sunshine Coast	Curtin University
2024		Queensland University of Technology	The University of Adelaide	James Cook University	The University of Melbourne
2025		Queensland University of Technology	University of Canberra	University of Technology Sydney	La Trobe University

==== Mixed ====
Year	Division	Gold	Silver	Bronze	4th
2005		The University of Queensland	Queensland University of Technology	Griffith University	The University of Adelaide
2006		The University of Adelaide	University of Newcastle	Bond University	Deakin University
2007		The University of Adelaide	Deakin University	Queensland University of Technology	Monash University
2008		Murdoch University	Monash University	Edith Cowan University	The University of Western Australia
2009		Edith Cowan University	RMIT University	Queensland University of Technology	Murdoch University
2010		RMIT University	Edith Cowan University	Deakin University	Queensland University of Technology
2012		RMIT University	The University of Western Australia	Adelaide University	Monash University
2019		Monash University	Victoria University	University of Queensland	University of Sunshine Coast
2022	Div 1	The University of Sydney 2	University of Technology Sydney	The University of Sydney	Murdoch University
2022	Div 2	University of New South Wales Sydney	Western Sydney University	Curtin University	Southern Cross University
2023	Div 1	University of Queensland	Griffith University	University of Technology Sydney	Macquarie University
2023	Div 2	Griffith University 2	University of New England	University of New England 2	Victoria University
2024		Griffith University	Griffith University 2	Macquarie University	Queensland University of Technology
2025	Div 1	University of Queensland	University of Sydney Gold	Griffith University	Griffith University 2
2025	Div 2	Queensland University of Technology	Macquarie University	Deakin University	Southern Cross University

=== Cheer and Dance ===
==== Overall ====
Year		Gold	Silver	Bronze	4th
2018		Queensland University of Technology (16 overall points)	Australian College of Physical Education (15.5 overall points)	University of Queensland (12.5 overall points)	University of Southern Queensland (4 overall points)
2019	Cheer	Monash University (8 points)	University of Queensland (6.5 points)	Griffith University (4.5 points)	Swinburne University of Technology (8 points)
2019	Dance	Monash University (19 points)	Queensland University of Technology (17 points)	Deakin University (13 points)	Macquarie University (4 points)
2023	Cheer	Monash University (9 points)	TIE (5 points)University of Melbourne Queensland University of Technology University of Queensland		
2023	Dance	Monash University (25 points)	University of Technology Sydney (14 points)	University of Queensland (12.5 points)	Queensland University of Technology (4 points)
2024	Cheer	Monash University (12 points)	University of Sydney (4 points)	Western Sydney University (1.5 points)	TIE (0 points) Australian National University; Bond University; International College of Management, Sydney; Macquarie University; University of Technology Sydney
2024	Dance	Macquarie University (20 points)	Monash University (16.5 points)	University of Sydney (16 points)	Western Sydney University (5 points)
2025	Cheer	Monash University (10 points)	Deakin University (4.5 points)	Bond University (2 points)	Western Sydney University (1 point)
2025	Dance	Monash University (26 points)	University of Technology Sydney (19.5 points)	Deakin University (14.5 points)	Western Sydney University (3 points)

==== Cheer ====
Year	Division	Gold	Silver	Bronze
2018	Category 1 All Girl Team	Queensland University of Technology		
2018	Category 2 All Girl Team Level 1	Queensland University of Technology	University of Queensland	Australian Catholic University
2018	Category 2 Coed Team Level 1	University of Southern Queensland	Australian College of Physical Education	University of Sunshine Coast
2018	Category 2 All Girl Team Level 2	Queensland University of Technology	University of Melbourne	University of Queensland
2018	Category 2 Coed Team Level 2	Western Sydney University	Australian College of Physical Education	University of Queensland
2018	Open All Girl Stunt Group	Queensland University of Technology	Deakin University	
2019	Category 1 All Girl Team Level 3/4	Monash University	The University of Melbourne	The University of Queensland
2019	Category 1 Coed Level 3/4	Queensland University of Technology	Monash University	The University of Queensland
2019	Category 2 All Girl Team Level 1/2 NT	Queensland University of Technology	Griffith University	The University of Queensland
2019	Category 2 Coed Team Level 1/2 NT	Deakin University	The University of Queensland	
2023	Category 1 Coed 3/4	Queensland University of Technology	Monash University	University of Queensland
2023	Category 1 All Girl 3/4	Monash University	Melbourne University	University of Queensland
2023	Category 2 All Girl 1/2 NT	Melbourne University	University of Wollongong	Queensland University of Technology
2023	Category 2 Coed 1/2 NT	Monash University	Swinburne University	University of Queensland
2024	Category 1 All Girl Team Level 3/4	Monash University		
2024	Category 1 Coed Team Level 3/4	Monash University	University of Sydney	
2024	Category 2 All Girl Team Level 1/2 NT	Monash University	University of Sydney	
2024	Category 2 Coed Team Level 1/2 NT	Monash University		
2025	Category 1 Coed Team Level 3/4	Monash University	Deakin University	
2025	Category 1 All Girl Team Elite Level 5	Monash University		
2025	Category 2 All Girl Team Level 1/2 NT	Bond University	Deakin University	Western Sydney University
2025	Category 2 Coed Team Level 1/2 NT	Monash University		

==== Dance ====
Year	Division	Gold	Silver	Bronze
2018	Category 1 Team Pom	Australian College of Physical Education	University of Queensland	University of Southern Queensland
2018	Category 1 Team Jazz	Queensland University of Technology	Australian College of Physical Education	University of Queensland
2018	Category 1 Team Hip Hop	Australian College of Physical Education	Queensland University of Technology	University of Queensland
2018	Category 2 Doubles Pom	Australian College of Physical Education		
2018	Category 2 Doubles Jazz	University of Queensland	Queensland University of Technology	Australian College of Physical Education
2018	Category 2 Doubles Hip Hop	Australian College of Physical Education	Queensland University of Technology	University of Queensland
2019	Category 1 Team Pom	Monash University	University of Queensland	Queensland University of Technology
2019	Category 1 Team Jazz	Monash University	University of Technology Sydney	University of Queensland
2019	Category 1 Team Hip Hop	Monash University	University of Technology Sydney	University of Queensland
2019	Category 1 Team Pom	Monash University	University of Queensland	Queensland University of Technology
2019	Category 1 Doubles Jazz	University of Queensland	Monash University	University of Technology Sydney
2019	Category 1 Doubles Hip Hop	Monash University	University of Technology Sydney	Australian College of Physical Education
2019	Category 1 Doubles Pom	Monash University	University of Technology Sydney	Queensland University of Technology
2019	Category 2 Contemporary/Lyrical	Monash University	University of Queensland	Melbourne University of Technology
2023	Category 1 Team Jazz	Monash University	University of Technology Sydney	University of Queensland
2023	Category 1 Team Hip Hop	Monash University	University of Technology Sydney	University of Queensland
2023	Category 1 Team Pom	Monash University	University of Queensland	Queensland University of Technology
2023	Category 1 Doubles Jazz	University of Queensland	Monash University	University of Technology Sydney
2023	Category 1 Doubles Hip Hop	Monash University	University of Technology Sydney	Australian College of Physical Education
2023	Category 1 Doubles Pom	Monash University	University of Technology Sydney	Queensland University of Technology
2023	Category 2 Contemporary Lyrical	Monash University	University of Queensland	University of Melbourne
2024	Category 1 Team Jazz	Macquarie University	University of Technology Sydney	Monash University
2024	Category 1 Team Hip Hop	Monash University	Macquarie University	Western Sydney University
2024	Category 1 Team Pom	Monash University	Macquarie University	University of Sydney
2024	Category 1 Doubles Jazz	University of Sydney	Macquarie University	Monash University
2024	Category 1 Doubles Hip Hop	University of Sydney	Western Sydney University	Macquarie University
2024	Category 1 Doubles Pom	Macquarie University	Monash University	University of Sydney
2024	Category 2 Contemporary Lyrical	University of Sydney	Monash University	Macquarie University
2024	Category 2 Doubles Contemporary Lyrical	University of Sydney	University of Technology Sydney	
2025	Category 1 Team Jazz	Monash University	University of Technology Sydney	Deakin University
2025	Category 1 Team Hip Hop	Monash University	University of Technology Sydney	Western Sydney University
2025	Category 1 Team Pom	Monash University	University of Technology Sydney	Deakin University
2025	Category 1 Doubles Jazz	Monash University	Deakin University	University of Technology Sydney
2025	Category 1 Doubles Hip Hop	University of Technology Sydney	Deakin University	Monash University
2025	Category 1 Doubles Pom	Monash University	Deakin University	University of Technology Sydney
2025	Category 2 Contemporary Lyrical	Monash University	University of Technology Sydney	Western Sydney University
2025	Category 2 Doubles Contemporary Lyrical	Monash University	Deakin University	University of Technology Sydney

=== Cross Country ===
==== Overall ====
Year	Gold	Silver	Bronze	4th
2005	The University of Sydney	The University of Queensland	The University of Melbourne	The University of Western Australia
2006	The University of Sydney	The University of Melbourne	Macquarie University	Monash University
2007	The University of Melbourne	University of Technology Sydney	The University of Sydney	Monash University

==== Men ====
Year	Gold	Silver	Bronze	4th
2025	The University of Melbourne	University of South Australia	The University of Newcastle	Deakin University

==== Women ====
Year	Gold	Silver	Bronze	4th
2025	Monash University	The University of Melbourne	Victoria University	University of New South Wales

=== Cycling ===
The 2013 AUGs were essentially dominated by the strong team from Sydney University (SUVelo), who took out the men's, women's, and overall champion trophies.

==== Overall ====
Year		Gold	Silver	Bronze	4th
2005		The University of Melbourne	The University of Queensland		La Trobe University; Macquarie University
2006		The University of Melbourne	La Trobe University	The University of Sydney	Flinders University
2007		The University of Melbourne	Victoria University	Griffith University	RMIT University
2008		The University of Melbourne	Monash University	Charles Sturt University	University of Ballarat
2009		The University of Western Australia	The University of Melbourne	University of New South Wales	Monash University
2010		The University of Melbourne	The University of Western Australia	University of New South Wales	Murdoch University
2021	Men (students)	University of Technology Sydney	The University of Melbourne	University of South Australia	Queensland University of Technology
2021	Women (Students)	Southern Cross University	The Australian National University		
2021	Staff	Monash University	Australian Catholic University	La Trobe University	RMIT University
2022		RMIT University	The University of Western Australia	The University of Melbourne	The Australian National University
2023		RMIT University	The University of Melbourne	The University of Queensland	Charles Sturt University
2024	Men	The University of Sydney	Charles Sturt University	James Cook University	The University of Queensland
2024	Women	The University of Sydney	The University of Melbourne	University of Canberra	Charles Sturt University

=== Distance Running ===
Year	Division	Gold	Silver	Bronze	4th
2021	Women's Half Marathon	Flinders University	The University of Adelaide	The University of Queensland	University of the Sunshine Coast
2021	Women's Marathon	University of Technology Sydney	Australian Defence Force Academy	Griffith University	
2021	Men's Half Marathon	The University of Queensland	University of the Sunshine Coast	University of the Sunshine Coast	Charles Stuart University
2021	Men's Marathon	Queensland University of Technology	Queensland University of Technology	The University of Queensland	Deakin University
2022	Women's	The University of Sydney	The University of New South Wales	Australian Catholic University	University of Technology Sydney
2022	Men's	University of Technology Sydney	The University of Sydney	Queensland University of Technology	Charles Sturt University
2023	Women's	Southern Cross University	The University of New South Wales	Charles Stuart University	The University of Sydney
2023	Men's	Queensland University of Technology	Deakin University	University of Southern Queensland	Griffith University
2024	Women's	The University of Sydney	University of Technology Sydney	The Australian National University	Macquarie University
2024	Men's	The University of Sydney	The Australian National University	The University of New South Wales	Australian College of Physical Education
2025	Women's	The University of Queensland	The University of Tasmania	Griffith University	Charles Sturt University
2025	Men's	The University of Sydney	The University of Queensland	University of South Australia	Deakin University

=== Diving ===
==== Overall ====
Year	Gold	Silver	Bronze	4th
2005	The University of Melbourne	The University of Western Australia	University of South Australia	Deakin University

=== Dodgeball ===
==== Mixed ====
Year	Gold	Silver	Bronze	4th
2025	Monash University	The University of Sydney	University of Technology Sydney	University of the Sunshine Coast

=== Fencing ===
==== Overall ====
Year	Gold	Silver	Bronze	4th
2007	The University of Melbourne	The University of Queensland	University of New South Wales	La Trobe University
2008	The University of Melbourne	Monash University	Adelaide University	Murdoch University
2009	The University of Melbourne	Monash University	The University of Queensland	The University of Sydney
2022	Curtin University	The University of Melbourne; The University of Western Australia		Monash University
2023	University of Melbourne	University of Sydney Monash University		RMIT University
2024	University of Melbourne	University of Sydney	University of New South Wales	University of Queensland

=== Football ===
==== Men ====
Year	Gold	Silver	Bronze	4th
1993	Victoria University	Monash University		
1995	University of Newcastle	The University of Melbourne		
1996	University of Newcastle	University of Queensland		
1997	The University of Sydney	University of Queensland	University of Newcastle	La Trobe University
1998	La Trobe University	University of Newcastle	The University of Melbourne	University of Canberra
1999	University of Canberra	University of Newcastle	The University of Melbourne	The University of New England
2000	Southern Cross University	Monash University	The University of Sydney	University of Queensland
2005	The University of Sydney	University of Technology Sydney	Queensland University of Technology	Victoria University
2006	The University of Sydney	Griffith University	The University of Melbourne	Monash University
2007	The University of New South Wales	Griffith University	The University of Melbourne	Queensland University of Technology
2008	Macquarie University	The University of Melbourne	Monash University	The University of New South Wales
2009	The University of Melbourne	The University of New South Wales	The University of Sydney	La Trobe University
2010	Edith Cowan University	Monash University	The University of Sydney	University of Western Sydney
2011	The University of Sydney	The University of New South Wales	Monash University	La Trobe University
2014	The University of Technology Sydney	Victoria University	La Trobe University	The University of New South Wales
2015	University of Melbourne	Victoria University	La Trobe University	The University of New South Wales
2022	Western Sydney University	University of Wollongong	The University of New South Wales	Victoria University
2023	University of Wollongong	Victoria University	Monash University	La Trobe University
2024	University of Wollongong	The University of Sydney	University of Western Sydney	Victoria University
2025	The University of New South Wales	The University of Sydney	University of Wollongong	La Trobe University

==== Men's Division 2 ====
Year	Gold	Silver	Bronze	4th
2025	University of Newcastle	Australia National University	University of the Sunshine Coast	Griffith University

==== Women ====
Hugh McCredie Trophy " The Intervarsity Cup" is Awarded for Women's Winning Team

Year	Gold	Silver	Bronze	4th
2005	University of Wollongong	The University of Melbourne	The University of Queensland	The University of Sydney
2006	University of Wollongong	The University of Sydney	The University of Melbourne	The University of Adelaide
2007	The University of Sydney	University of Wollongong	University of New South Wales	Macquarie University
2008	The University of Sydney	University of Wollongong	The University of Melbourne	Macquarie University
2009	University of Wollongong	University of New South Wales	The University of Sydney	Macquarie University
2010	The University of Western Australia	The University of Sydney	Curtin University of Technology	University of New South Wales
2022	The University of Sydney	University of Wollongong	La Trobe University	The Australian National University
2023	Australian Catholic University	University of Wollongong	The University of Sydney	University of Western Sydney
2025	University of Wollongong	The University of Sydney	Australian Catholic University	Monash University

=== Futsal ===
==== Men's Division 1 ====
Year	Gold	Silver	Bronze	4th
2013	Monash University	The University of New South Wales	University of Western Sydney	Macquarie University
2014	Monash University	The University of New South Wales	University of Technology Sydney	University of the Sunshine Coast
2015	University of Canberra	Monash University	University of the Sunshine Coast	The University of Western Australia
2016	RMIT University	Edith Cowan University	Monash University	Australian Catholic University
2017	University of Technology Sydney	The University of New South Wales	The University of Queensland	University of the Sunshine Coast
2018	University of Technology Sydney	RMIT University	University of the Sunshine Coast	The University of New South Wales
2019	RMIT University	University of Technology Sydney	Australian Catholic University	Macquarie University
2022	Curtin University	Western Sydney University	University of Technology Sydney	Monash University
2023	University of Technology Sydney	Curtin University	Western Sydney University	Queensland University of Technology
2024	The University of Sydney	University of Technology Sydney	Monash University	Western Sydney University
2025	University of Technology Sydney	Edith Cowan University	Western Sydney University	RMIT University

==== Women's Division 1 ====
Year	Gold	Silver	Bronze	4th
2013	University of Technology Sydney	Macquarie University	University of the Sunshine Coast	Edith Cowan University
2014	University of the Sunshine Coast	University of Technology Sydney	Macquarie University	Griffith University
2015	University of Technology Sydney	Macquarie University	The University of Western Australia	Griffith University
2016	Curtin University	The University of Sydney	Monash University	University of Technology Sydney
2017	University of Technology Sydney	Griffith University	Australian Catholic University	University of the Sunshine Coast
2018	University of Technology Sydney	Queensland University of Technology	The University of Sydney	University of the Sunshine Coast
2019	Southern Cross University	Australian Catholic University	Macquarie University	University of Technology Sydney
2022	University of Technology Sydney	Australian Catholic University	University of the Sunshine Coast	Western Sydney University
2023	University of Technology Sydney	Queensland University of Technology	The University of Melbourne	University of Sunshine Coast
2024	University of Technology Sydney	James Cook University	Macquarie University	University of Sunshine Coast
2025	University of Technology Sydney	Western Sydney University	The University of Sydney	Edith Cowan University

==== Men's Division 2 ====
Year	Gold	Silver	Bronze	4th
2018	University of Tasmania	Western Sydney University	Queensland University of Technology	International College of Management Sydney
2022	University of Tasmania	University of the Sunshine Coast	Swinburne University of Technology	Edith Cowan University
2023	University of Tasmania	Deakin University	Swinburne University of Technology	Southern Cross University
2024	Swinburne University of Technology	Monash University	University of Tasmania	University of Canberra
2025	Curtin University	Macquarie University	The University of Notre Dame Australia	Monash University 2

==== Women's Division 2 ====
Year	Gold	Silver	Bronze	4th
2018	The University of New South Wales	Macquarie University	Western Sydney University	University of Tasmania

=== Golf ===
==== Overall ====
Year	Gold	Silver	Bronze	4th
2006	Griffith University	Macquarie University	The University of Sydney	Victoria University
2007	Griffith University	The University of Western Australia	The University of Sydney	La Trobe University
2008	Victoria University	The University of Western Australia	Monash University	Macquarie University
2009	Griffith University	The University of Melbourne	Bond University	Murdoch University

==== Men ====
Year	Gold	Silver	Bronze	4th
2006	Griffith University	Macquarie University	Victoria University	The University of Melbourne
2007	Griffith University 1	Victoria University 1	Griffith University 2	Macquarie University
2008	Victoria University	Griffith University	The University of Western Australia	Macquarie University
2009	Griffith University	The University of Melbourne	Bond University	Murdoch University
2022	Southern Cross University	Bond University	University of Sydney	University of Notre Dame Australia
2023	UNSW Sydney	University of Melbourne	University of Sydney	University of Technology Sydney
2024	University of Technology Sydney	University of Melbourne	UNSW Sydney	University of Sydney

==== Women ====
Year	Gold	Silver	Bronze	4th
2006	Griffith University	The University of Sydney	Macquarie University	
2007	The University of Western Australia	Griffith University	The University of Sydney	La Trobe University
2008	The University of Western Australia	Victoria University	Monash University	Macquarie University
2022	University of New South Wales			
2023	University of Melbourne	University of Sydney		

=== Handball ===
==== Mixed Division 1 ====
Year	Gold	Silver	Bronze	4th
2007 (Note: Only men)	Griffith University	University of New South Wales	University of Sydney	University of South Australia
2008	Macquarie University	Royal Melbourne Institute of Technology	Victoria University	University of Melbourne
2009	Bond University	Macquarie University	Victoria University	University of Sydney
2010	Curtin University	University of Western Australia	Monash University	Edith Cowan University
2011	University of Sydney	University of Western Australia	Edith Cowan University	University of New South Wales
2012	University of Technology Sydney	University of Sydney	Monash University	University of Ballarat
2013	University of Technology Sydney	University of Queensland	University of Western Australia	University of Sydney
2014	University of Sydney	Deakin University	University of Western Australia	University of Technology Sydney
2015	University of Technology Sydney	Deakin University	Australian College of Physical Education	University of Sydney
2016	Deakin University	Queensland University of Technology	University of Technology Sydney	University of Adelaide
2017	Griffith University	University of Canberra	Queensland University of Technology	University of Western Sydney
2018	University of Queensland	University of Technology Sydney	Queensland University of Technology	Australian College of Physical Education
2019	University of Queensland	University of Technology Sydney	University of New South Wales	University of the Sunshine Coast
2023	University of Queensland	Queensland University of Technology	University of Technology Sydney	University of Western Sydney

==== Mixed Division 2 ====
Year	Gold	Silver	Bronze	4th
2009	University of New South Wales	University of Western Australia	University of Technology Sydney	Edith Cowan University
2010	No Tournament			
2011	University of Technology Sydney	Bond University	University of Queensland	Deakin University
2012	Victoria University	University of Wollongong	Griffith University	University of Newcastle
2013	Deakin University	Griffith University	Australian College of Physical Education	Queensland University of Technology
2014	Australian College of Physical Education	University of Adelaide	Queensland University of Technology	Griffith University
2015	Queensland University of Technology	University of Canberra	Griffith University	RMIT University
2016	Griffith University	University of Canberra	Flinders University	University of Wollongong

=== Hockey ===
==== Men ====
The Syme Cup is Awarded to the Winning Men's Hockey Team.

Year	Gold	Silver	Bronze	4th
1993	Queensland University of Technology	University of Newcastle	????	????
1994	University of Wollongong		????	????
1995	The University of Western Australia	Northern Territory University	Monash University	RMIT University
1996	University of Canberra	The University of Western Australia	Australian National University	????
1997	University of Tasmania - Hobart	????	????	????
1998	University of Canberra	University of Tasmania - Hobart	Monash University	Australian National University
1999	The University of Melbourne	Curtin University of Technology	The University of Western Australia	RMIT University
2000	The University of Melbourne	Charles Sturt University - Mitchell	Australian National University	The University of Sydney
2001	RMIT University	The University of Melbourne	The University of Western Australia	La Trobe University - Bundoora
2002	Curtin University of Technology	University of Tasmania - Hobart	The University of Melbourne	Monash University
2003	RMIT University	The University of Sydney	University of Newcastle	The University of Western Australia
2004	The University of Western Australia	The University of Sydney	La Trobe University - Bundoora	RMIT University
2005	The University of Western Australia	The University of Melbourne	The University of Adelaide	The University of Sydney
2006	The University of Western Australia	The University of Melbourne	Monash University	La Trobe University
2007	The University of Western Australia	The University of Melbourne	The University of Sydney	The University of Adelaide
2008	The University of Western Australia	Monash University	The University of Melbourne	The University of Sydney
2009	The University of Western Australia	Monash University	The University of Queensland	The University of Melbourne
2010	The University of Western Australia	The University of Adelaide	Monash University	Curtin University
2011	The University of Sydney	Monash University	The University of Melbourne	The University of Adelaide
2012	The University of Melbourne	The University of Sydney	The University of Adelaide	Monash University
2013	The University of Melbourne	Monash University	The University of Queensland	The University of Western Australia
2017	The University of Queensland			
2018	The University of Queensland			
2019	The University of Queensland			
2022	Curtin University	Deakin University	The University of Melbourne	The University of Western Australia
2023	University of Tasmania	The University of Queensland	Queensland University of Technology	The University of Melbourne
2024	Australian National University	RMIT University	Macquarie University	University of Wollongong
2025	The University of Melbourne	Curtin University	The University of Newcastle	Griffith University

==== Women ====
Inter University Women's Hockey Cup is Awarded to the Winning Women's Hockey Team.

Year	Div	Gold	Silver	Bronze	4th
1993		The University of Queensland	????	????	????
1994		University of Wollongong	????	La Trobe University	????
1995		The University of Sydney	University of Wollongong	Southern Cross University	The University of Melbourne
1996		The University of Sydney	The University of Melbourne	The University of Queensland	????
1997		Deakin University - Burwood	????	????	????
1998		Deakin University - Burwood	Monash University	The University of Queensland	The University of Sydney
1999		The University of Sydney	Monash University	????	????
2000		The University of Sydney	The University of Melbourne	The University of Queensland	Charles Sturt University - Mitchell
2001		The University of Sydney	Charles Sturt University - Bathurst	The University of Queensland	La Trobe University - Bundoora
2002		The University of Sydney	Charles Sturt University - Bathurst	University of Tasmania - Hobart	La Trobe University - Bundoora
2003		The University of Sydney	The University of Melbourne	University of Newcastle	The University of Western Australia
2004		Queensland University of Technology	Charles Sturt University - Bathurst	The University of Melbourne	Monash University
2005		Charles Sturt University - Bathurst	The University of Western Australia	The University of Sydney	The University of Melbourne
2006		The University of Sydney	Charles Sturt University - Bathurst	Monash University	The University of Adelaide
2007		Monash University	Charles Sturt University	University of Wollongong	Macquarie University
2008		Queensland University of Technology	The University of Western Australia	University of Wollongong	The University of Sydney
2009		The University of Western Australia	The University of Sydney	The University of Melbourne	Monash University
2010		The University of Western Australia	The University of Sydney	Monash University	Queensland University of Technology
2011		The University of Melbourne	The University of Sydney	The University of Western Australia	Monash University
2012		The University of Sydney	The University of Melbourne	Monash University	The University of Adelaide
2013		The University of Melbourne	Queensland University of Technology	University of Newcastle	Monash University
2022	Div 1	The University of Melbourne	The University of Western Australia	The Australian National University	University of Wollongong
2022	Div 2	The University of Sydney	RMIT University	University of Adelaide	University of Tasmania
2023	Div 1	The University of Sydney	The University of Queensland	University of Newcastle	The Australian National University
2023	Div 2	University of Wollongong	Monash University	University of New South Wales	Western Sydney University
2024		University of Wollongong	The University of Sydney	Queensland University of Technology	University of Newcastle
2025		The University of Queensland	The University of Sydney	University of Wollongong	Southern Cross University

=== Judo ===
==== Overall ====
Year	Gold	Silver	Bronze	4th
2006	Macquarie University	The University of Adelaide	University of South Australia	Monash University
2007	The University of New South Wales	The University of Queensland	Macquarie University	The University of Sydney
2008	The University of Melbourne	Monash University	The University of Sydney	University of Technology Sydney
2009	The University of Sydney	The University of Queensland	Macquarie University	Australian National University
2010	The University of Western Australia			
2022	The University of Sydney	Monash University	Curtin University	University of South Australia
2023	University of Technology Sydney	The University of Queensland	Monash University	The University of Sydney
2024	University of New South Wales; Monash University		Western Sydney University	The University of Sydney

=== Kendo ===
==== Overall ====
Year	Gold	Silver	Bronze	4th
2006	The University of Sydney	The University of Melbourne	Macquarie University	Monash University
2007	The University of Sydney	The University of Melbourne	Monash University	Macquarie University
2008	The University of Melbourne	Monash University	University of Technology Sydney	The University of New South Wales
2009	University of Technology Sydney	The University of Melbourne	Macquarie University	The University of Sydney
2010	Monash University	University of Ballarat	The University of New South Wales	Murdoch University
2011	The University of New South Wales	Monash University	The University of Melbourne	University of Southern Queensland
2022	The University of Sydney	University of Technology Sydney	The Australian National University	Murdoch University & The University of Melbourne (Tie)
2023	University of Technology Sydney	The University of Sydney	UNSW Sydney	Western Sydney University
2024	The University of Sydney	University of Technology Sydney	University of South Australia	Flinders University; RMIT; Western Sydney University (Tie)

=== Lacrosse ===
==== Overall ====
Year	Gold	Silver	Bronze	4th
2019 (Div 2)	University of South Australia	University of Melbourne	Victoria University	La Trobe University
2022	RMIT University	University of Melbourne	Edith Cowan University	University of New South Wales Sydney
2023	University of Melbourne	RMIT University	University of New South Wales	Flinders University
2024	University of Melbourne	University of Sydney	RMIT University	University of New South Wales
2025	University of Melbourne	RMIT University	University of Sydney	University of New South Wales

=== Lawn Bowls ===
==== Open ====
Year	Gold	Silver	Bronze	4th
2006	University of New England	James Cook University	Curtin University of Technology	The University of Melbourne
2007	Curtin University of Technology	University of New England	The University of Queensland	Edith Cowan University
2008	University of New England	Curtin University of Technology	Edith Cowan University	Southern Cross University
2009	Edith Cowan University	Curtin University of Technology	The University of Western Australia	Macquarie University
2010	Edith Cowan University	Curtin University of Technology	The University of Western Australia	Charles Sturt University
2023	UNSW Sydney	University of Newcastle	Charles Sturt University	Charles Sturt University 2
2024	University of New South Wales	James Cook University	Charles Sturt University	University of Sydney
2025	University of Queensland	University of the Sunshine Coast	University of Sydney	James Cook University

=== League of Legends ===
Year	Division	Gold	Silver	Bronze	4th
2021	Div 1	University of Technology Sydney	Queensland University of Technology	The Australian National University	The University of Sydney
2021	Div 2	Curtin University	Queensland University of Technology	Murdoch University	The University of New South Wales
2022	Div 1	Deakin University	University of Technology Sydney	Queensland University of Technology	The University of Queensland
2022	Div 2	Monash University 2	University of New South Wales Sydney 2	The University of Queensland 2	Queensland University of Technology 2

=== Netball ===
==== Women ====
Year	Division	Gold	Silver	Bronze	4th
2005		The University of Sydney	The University of Melbourne	The University of Queensland	Macquarie University
2006		Victoria University	The University of Melbourne	Flinders University	RMIT University
2007		The University of Melbourne	Victoria University	The University of Sydney	Monash University
2008		The University of Melbourne	Monash University	Victoria University	The University of Sydney
2009		Monash University	The University of Melbourne	The University of New South Wales	Griffith University
2010		The University of Melbourne	La Trobe University	Monash University	Queensland University of Technology
2018		Griffith University	Queensland University of Technology	University of Technology Sydney	University of Newcastle
2019		Griffith University	The University of Sydney	University of Technology Sydney	Bond University
2022	Div 1	The University of Melbourne	University of Technology Sydney	The University of Sydney	Western Sydney University
2022	Div 2	Federation University Australia	University of Southern Queensland	James Cook University	University of Wollongong
2023	Div 1	Australian Catholic University	University of Technology Sydney	Western Sydney University	The University of Melbourne
2023	Div 2	University of Wollongong	Charles Sturt University	La Trobe University	University of Canberra
2024	Div 1	Australian Catholic University	University of Technology Sydney	University of Newcastle	Western Sydney University
2024	Div 2	Australian College of Physical Education	Victoria University	The University of Notre Dame Australia	Charles Sturt University
2025	Div 1	University of Technology Sydney	Australian Catholic University	The University of Sydney	University of Newcastle
2025	Div 2	La Trobe University	The University of Canberra	Griffith University 2	Australia National University

==== Mixed ====
Year	Division	Gold	Silver	Bronze	4th
2005		The University of Melbourne	The University of Sydney	Deakin University	University of Newcastle
2006		Deakin University	Monash University	Victoria University	The University of Adelaide
2007		Monash University	Victoria University	The University of Adelaide	The University of Western Australia
2008		Victoria University	Monash University	The University of Melbourne	Macquarie University
2009		University of Technology Sydney	Victoria University	The University of Adelaide	The University of Western Australia
2010		Victoria University	Monash University	University of Technology Sydney	The University of Western Australia
2012		RMIT University	University of Technology Sydney	The University of Melbourne	Monash University
2018		Monash University	Victoria University	RMIT	Deakin University
2019		Macquarie University	Victoria University	University of Technology Sydney	La Trobe University
2019		The University of Melbourne	University of Technology Sydney	The University of Sydney	Western Sydney University
2022	Div 1	University of Canberra	Macquarie University	La Trobe University	The University of Western Australia
2022	Div 2	University of New South Wales Sydney	University of New England	Swinburne University of Technology	Western Sydney University
2023	Div 1	Monash University	University of Sydney	University of Technology Sydney	La Trobe University
2023	Div 2	Griffith University	Charles Sturt University	University of Southern Australia	The University of Adelaide
2024	Div 1	University of Sydney	University of Technology Sydney	University of Canberra	Monash University
2024	Div 2	Deakin University	University of Western Australia	Charles Sturt University	University of New England
2025	Div 1	University of New South Wales	University of Technology Sydney	Macquarie University	Deakin University
2025	Div 2	University of Melbourne	Edith Cowan University	Bond University	RMIT University

=== Oztag ===
==== Mixed ====
Year	Gold	Silver	Bronze	4th
2025	Western Sydney University	University of Technology Sydney	Australian College of Physical Education	The University of Sydney

=== Rowing ===
Rowing was one of the first events competed for between Australian universities. Men's Eights have been raced since 1888, lightweight fours since 1963, and women's eights since 1978. The NSW Centenary Cup is awarded for the university that scores the most points overall in all events; however, the most prestigious events remain the Men's and Women's Eights.

==== Overall ====
Year	Gold	Silver	Bronze	4th
1993	The University of Adelaide	The University of Sydney	University of New South Wales	Edith Cowan University
1994	The University of Western Australia	The University of Melbourne	The University of Sydney	The University of Adelaide
1995	The University of Melbourne	The University of Sydney	Griffith University	The University of Adelaide
1996				
1997	University of Technology Sydney	The University of Sydney	The University of Melbourne	The University of Queensland
1998	The University of Melbourne			
1999				
2000				
2001	The University of Sydney	The University of Melbourne	University of Technology Sydney	University of Canberra
2002	The University of Sydney	University of Technology Sydney	The University of Melbourne	University of Tasmania - Hobart
2003	The University of Sydney	The University of Queensland	The University of Melbourne	University of Technology Sydney
2004	The University of Melbourne	The University of Sydney	University of Tasmania - Hobart	The University of Western Australia
2005	The University of Sydney	The University of Melbourne	The University of Queensland	Macquarie University
2006 (Not Part of AUG)	The University of Melbourne	The University of Sydney	Macquarie University	The University of Adelaide
2007	The University of Sydney	The University of Melbourne	The University of Adelaide	Macquarie University
2008 (Not part of AUG)	The University of Sydney	The University of Melbourne	The University of Queensland	Australian National University
2009 (Not Part of AUG)	The University of Sydney	The University of Melbourne	The University of Queensland	Monash University
2010	The University of Sydney	The University of Western Australia	The University of Adelaide	Monash University
2022	The University of Sydney	The University of Technology Sydney	The University of Western Australia	The University of Adelaide
2023	The University of Sydney	The University of Melbourne	University of Technology Sydney	The University of Queensland
2024	The University of Sydney	University of Technology Sydney	Monash University	University of New South Wales

==== Men's Eight ====
The Oxford and Cambridge Cup is awarded to the winning Men's Eight.

Year	Gold	Silver	Bronze
1993	The University of Sydney		
1994	University of Tasmania	The University of Sydney	The University of Melbourne
1995	The University of Melbourne	The University of Queensland	The University of Western Australia
1996	University of Technology Sydney	The University of Sydney	
1997	The University of Western Australia	University of Technology Sydney	
1998	The University of Western Australia		
1999	The University of Melbourne	The University of Sydney	
2000	The University of Melbourne	Monash University	University of Technology Sydney
2001	The University of Melbourne	The University of Sydney	University of Technology Sydney
2002	University of Technology Sydney	The University of Melbourne	The University of Sydney
2003	University of Technology Sydney	The University of Sydney	The University of Queensland
2004	The University of Sydney	The University of Adelaide	The University of Melbourne
2005	The University of Sydney	The University of Queensland	The University of Adelaide
2006 (Not Part of AUG)	The University of Sydney	The University of Adelaide	The University of Melbourne
2007	The University of Sydney	The University of Adelaide	The University of Melbourne
2008 (Not Part of AUG)	The University of Queensland	The University of Sydney	The University of Melbourne
2009 (Not Part of AUG)	The University of Adelaide	The University of Sydney	The University of Melbourne
2010	The University of Adelaide	The University of Sydney	The University of Melbourne
2022	The University of Sydney	The University of Western Australia	University of Technology Sydney
2023	The University of Sydney	The University of Adelaide	University of Technology Sydney
2024	University of Technology Sydney	University of Sydney	University of Melbourne

==== Women's Eight ====
The Godfrey Tanner Cup is awarded to the winning Women's Eight.

Year	Gold	Silver	Bronze
1993	The University of Adelaide		
1994	University of New South Wales	The University of Western Australia	University of Tasmania
1995	The University of Melbourne	The University of Adelaide	The University of Sydney
1996	The University of Adelaide		
1997	University of Technology Sydney	University of Canberra	The University of Adelaide
1998	The University of Adelaide	The University of Melbourne	
1999			
2000	The University of Melbourne	The University of Adelaide	RMIT University
2001	The University of Sydney	The University of Melbourne	RMIT University
2002	The University of Sydney	The University of Melbourne	Monash University
2003	The University of Sydney	The University of Melbourne	University of Technology Sydney
2004	The University of Melbourne	University of Tasmania - Hobart	The University of Western Australia
2005	The University of Sydney	The University of Melbourne	University of New South Wales
2006 (Not Part of AUG)	The University of Melbourne	The University of Sydney	Macquarie University
2007	The University of Sydney	The University of Melbourne	The University of Western Australia
2008 (Not Part of AUG)	The University of Melbourne	The University of Sydney	The University of Adelaide
2009 (Not Part of AUG)	The University of Sydney	The University of Queensland	The University of Melbourne
2010	The University of Western Australia	The University of Sydney	The University of Adelaide
2022	The University of Sydney	University of Technology Sydney	The University of Adelaide
2023	The University of Sydney	Monash University	The University of Melbourne
2024	The University of Sydney	Monash University	University of Adelaide

=== Rugby League 9's ===
==== Men ====
Year	Gold	Silver	Bronze	4th
2023	Western Sydney University	University of the Sunshine Coast	Charles Sturt University	
2024	University of Technology Sydney	Western Sydney University	Charles Sturt University	
2025	University of Technology Sydney	Western Sydney University	Charles Sturt University	Griffith University

=== Rugby Union 7's ===
==== Men ====
The Nick Farr-Jones Cup is Awarded to the Winning Men's Rugby Union Team.

Year	Gold	Silver	Bronze	4th
2005	Queensland University of Technology	The University of New England	The University of Western Australia	Macquarie University
2006	Queensland University of Technology	The University of Notre Dame Australia	Macquarie University	Australian Defence Force Academy
2007	Queensland University of Technology	The University of Sydney	Macquarie University	The University of Notre Dame Australia
2008	University of Technology Sydney	University of New England	The University of Queensland	Queensland University of Technology
2009	The University of Queensland	University of New South Wales	The University of Sydney	The University of Notre Dame Australia
2010	The University of Sydney	The University of Western Australia	Griffith University	University of New South Wales
2022	The University of Technology Sydney	The University of Sydney	The University of Western Australia	The University of Melbourne
2023	The University of Melbourne	The University of Sydney	The University of Technology Sydney	The University of Newcastle
2024	The University of Technology Sydney	The University of Newcastle	The University of Sydney	The University of Melbourne
2025	The University of Technology Sydney	The University of Sydney	Macquarie University	The University of Melbourne

==== Women ====
Year	Gold	Silver	Bronze	4th
2005	University of Newcastle	University of Wollongong	Queensland University of Technology	Australian National University
2022	The University of Sydney	University of Wollongong	Charles Sturt University	University of New England
2023	The University of Technology Sydney	The University of Sydney	The University of Newcastle	James Cook University
2024	The University of Technology Sydney	The University of Sydney	James Cook University	The University of Newcastle
2025	The University of Technology Sydney	The University of Sydney	University of the Sunshine Coast	The University of Newcastle

=== Sailing ===
A demonstration sport in 2010 and a full sport in 2011, having been revived after a long period of decline. See Australian University Sailing.

==== Teams Racing ====
Year	Gold	Silver	Bronze	4th
2010	The University of Western Australia	The University of New South Wales	Monash University	University of Technology Sydney/Macquarie University
2011	The University of Western Australia	Monash University	The University of Sydney	The University of New South Wales

==== Match Racing ====
Year	Gold	Silver	Bronze	4th
2010	The University of Western Australia	The University of Sydney	University of Notre Dame	The University of New South Wales

Year	Gold	Silver	Bronze	4th
2015	Australian Maritime College	The University of New South Wales	Australian National University	

=== Snow ===
==== Overall University Rankings by Medals ====
Year	Gold	Silver	Bronze	4th
2022	University of Technology Sydney	The University of Sydney	University of Wollongong	The University of Melbourne
2023	University of Technology Sydney	The University of Sydney	The University of Canberra	The University of New South Wales
2025	The University of Sydney	University of Technology Sydney	Macquarie University	Monash University

==== Overall Men's Rankings by Medals ====
Year	Gold	Silver	Bronze	4th
2022	University of Technology Sydney	The University of Sydney	University of Wollongong	RMIT University
2023	University of Technology Sydney	The University of New South Wales	The University of Sydney	The University of Canberra
2025	The University of Sydney	University of Technology Sydney	Macquarie University	University of New England

==== Overall Women's Rankings by Medals ====
Year	Gold	Silver	Bronze	4th
2022	University of Technology Sydney	The University of Sydney	The University of Melbourne	The University of New South Wales
2023	University of Technology Sydney	The University of Canberra	The University of Sydney	Australian National University
2025	The University of Sydney	University of the Sunshine Coast	Monash University	University of New South Wales

=== Softball ===
Year	Gold	Silver	Bronze	4th
2005	The University of Sydney	University of Ballarat	Macquarie University	University of Southern Queensland
2006	Macquarie University	The University of Western Australia	The University of Melbourne	University of New South Wales
2007	Macquarie University	The University of Western Australia	The University of Sydney	University of Western Sydney
2008	The University of Sydney	Monash University	The University of Melbourne	Macquarie University
2009	The University of Sydney	Monash University	University of Technology Sydney	University of Western Sydney
2010 (Combined with Baseball)				

=== Squash ===
==== Men's ====
Year	Gold	Silver	Bronze	4th
2006	The University of Melbourne	Monash University	Macquarie University	University of New South Wales
2007	The University of Melbourne	Macquarie University	Griffith University	Queensland University of Technology
2008	The University of Melbourne	Monash University	La Trobe University	University of Technology Sydney
2009	The University of Melbourne	La Trobe University	The University of Western Australia	Monash University
2010	Edith Cowan University	The University of Western Australia	Monash University	Curtin University of Technology

==== Women's ====
Year	Gold	Silver	Bronze	4th
2006	Monash University	The University of Melbourne	University of Sydney	Queensland University of Technology
2009	The University of Western Australia	The University of Melbourne	Monash University	La Trobe University
2010	Monash University	The University of Western Australia	Edith Cowan University	

==== Mixed ====
Year	Gold	Silver	Bronze	4th
2022	Tie - University of Tasmania & University of Western Australia		University of Melbourne	Monash University
2023	The University of Melbourne	The University of Sydney	University of Tasmania	University of New South Wales Sydney
2024	The University of Sydney	The University of Melbourne	Australian National University	University of Canberra
2025	The University of Sydney	The University of Queensland	University of Technology Sydney	University of New South Wales

=== Swimming ===
==== Overall ====
Berge Phillips Trophy is Awarded for Winning Team Overall

Year	Gold	Silver	Bronze	4th
2005	The University of Queensland	The University of Melbourne	Macquarie University	The University of Western Australia
2006	The University of Melbourne	The University of Sydney	Macquarie University	University of New South Wales
2007	The University of Sydney	The University of Melbourne	Macquarie University	Queensland University of Technology
2008	Macquarie University	Monash University	The University of Sydney	The University of Western Australia
2009	Monash University	The University of Sydney	Queensland University of Technology	The University of Queensland
2010	The University of Sydney	The University of Notre Dame Australia	The University of Queensland	The University of Melbourne
2021	Queensland University of Technology	The University of Queensland	Griffith University	University of Technology Sydney
2022	Bond University	University of Sydney	Monash University	Deakin University
2023	Bond University	The University of Queensland	Queensland University of Technology	University of Technology of Sydney
2024	Bond University	The University of Queensland	University of Technology Sydney	Queensland University of Technology
2025	Bond University	The University of Queensland	University of Technology Sydney	The University of Sydney

=== Surfing ===
==== Overall Champion ====
Year	Gold	Silver	Bronze	4th
2022	Southern Cross University	The University of Queensland	The University of Sydney	University of Technology Sydney
2023	The University of Queensland	University of Technology Sydney	Southern Cross University	University of the Sunshine Coast
2024	Southern Cross University	University of the Sunshine Coast	The University of Sydney	University of Technology Sydney

==== Women's Overall Champion ====
Year	Gold	Silver	Bronze	4th
2022	Southern Cross University	Australian Catholic University	University of Wollongong	The University of Queensland
2023	The University of Queensland	Southern Cross University	University of Technology Sydney	University of the Sunshine Coast
2024	Southern Cross University	The University of Sydney	University of the Sunshine Coast	The University of Queensland

==== Men's Overall Champion ====
Year	Gold	Silver	Bronze	4th
2022	The University of Queensland	University of Technology Sydney	The University of Sydney	The University of Melbourne
2023	University of Technology Sydney	The University of Sydney	University of the Sunshine Coast	The University of Queensland
2024	University of Technology Sydney	Southern Cross University	University of the Sunshine Coast	The University of Queensland

=== T20 Cricket ===
==== Men's ====
Year	Gold	Silver	Bronze	4th
2015	The University of Sydney	The University of New South Wales	University of Technology Sydney	Monash University
2016	The University of Sydney	University of Technology Sydney	Monash University	Curtin University
2017	The University of New South Wales	Monash University	The University of Sydney	University of Technology Sydney
2019	The University of Sydney	University of Technology Sydney	Deakin University	University of South Australia
2022	The University of Sydney	University of Technology Sydney	University of Tasmania	The University of Queensland
2023	The University of Sydney & University of Technology Sydney		Macquarie University & The University of New South Wales	
2024	The University of Queensland	The University of Western Australia	Macquarie University	University of Technology Sydney
2025	UNSW Sydney	University of Technology Sydney	Macquarie University	The University of Western Australia

==== Women's ====
Year	Gold	Silver	Bronze
2025	Queensland University Purple	Queensland University Maroon	New South Wales; Victoria University

=== Table Tennis ===
==== Men ====
Year	Gold	Silver	Bronze	4th
2008	Monash University	University of New South Wales	The University of Melbourne	Swinburne University of Technology
2009	University of New South Wales	Swinburne University of Technology	The University of Melbourne	Monash University
2010	University of New South Wales			
2011	University of New South Wales			
2012	The University of Melbourne			
2013	The University of Melbourne			
2014	University of New South Wales			
2015	University of New South Wales			
2016	University of New South Wales			
2017	The University of Melbourne			
2018	Monash University	University of New South Wales	The University of Melbourne	The University of Queensland
2022	The University of Melbourne	University of New South Wales	The University of Queensland	The University of Sydney
2023	The University of Queensland	University of New South Wales Sydney	The University of Sydney	Deakin University
2024	The University of Sydney	University of New South Wales Sydney	The University of Melbourne	Monash University
2025	The University of Sydney	The University of Queensland	University of Technology Sydney	The University of Melbourne

==== Women ====
Year	Gold	Silver	Bronze	4th
2018	Monash University	The University of Melbourne		
2022	The University of Melbourne	The University of Sydney	Tie: Monash University & The University of Queensland	
2023	The University of Melbourne	The University of Sydney	University of New South Wales Sydney	The University of Queensland
2024	The University of Sydney	Monash University	University of New South Wales Sydney	Australian National University
2025	Monash University	The University of Sydney	University of Technology Sydney	The University of Melbourne

=== Taekwondo ===
==== Overall ====
Year	Gold	Silver	Bronze	4th
2006	University of New South Wales	The University of Melbourne	Royal Melbourne Institute of Technology	Monash University
2007	University of New South Wales	Monash University	The University of Sydney	Edith Cowan University
2008	The University of Melbourne	Royal Melbourne Institute of Technology	Monash University	The University of Sydney
2009	Monash University	University of New South Wales	Victoria University	The University of Melbourne
2010	Monash University			
2013	University of New South Wales			
2022	The University of New South Wales	Monash University	The University of Melbourne	The University of Sydney
2023	University of New South Wales Sydney	Monash University	The University of Melbourne	The University of Sydney

=== Tennis ===
==== Men ====
Year	Division	Gold	Silver	Bronze	4th
2005		The University of Sydney	The University of Queensland	Queensland University of Technology	Deakin University
2006		The University of Sydney	Macquarie University	Monash University	The University of Melbourne
2007		The University of Sydney	Monash University	Macquarie University	University of New South Wales
2008		The University of Sydney	Monash University	University of New South Wales	The University of Western Australia
2009		Murdoch University	The University of Western Australia	Griffith University	The University of Sydney
2010		The University of Sydney	Murdoch University	The University of Melbourne	Monash University
2022	Div 1	RMIT University	The University of Western Australia	The University of Sydney	University of New South Wales
2022	Div 2	University of South Australia	University of Technology Sydney	Monash University	Deakin University
2023		The University of Sydney	Monash University	Bond University	Macquarie University
2024	Div 1	The University of Sydney	The University of Western Australia	Deakin University	RMIT University
2024	Div 2	Macquarie University	University of Technology Sydney	University of New South Wales	Australia National University
2025	Div 1	The University of Western Australia	The University of Sydney	The University of Queensland	The University of Melbourne
2025	Div 2	Deakin University	University of New South Wales	Macquarie University	Griffith University

==== Women ====
Year	Division	Gold	Silver	Bronze	4th
2005		Monash University	The University of Melbourne	University of Technology Sydney	The University of Queensland
2006		University of Technology Sydney	The University of Sydney	Bond University	The University of Melbourne
2007		The University of Sydney	Australian College of Physical Education	University of Technology Sydney	University of Newcastle
2008		Monash University	University of Technology Sydney	University of Newcastle	The University of Melbourne
2009		Monash University	Griffith University	The University of Sydney	University of Newcastle
2010		The University of Sydney	The University of Western Australia	Monash University	La Trobe University
2011		The University of Sydney	The University of Western Australia	Royal Melbourne Institute of Technology	University of Melbourne
2022		The University of Sydney	University of Technology Sydney	Macquarie University	The University of Western Australia
2023	Div 1	Macquarie University	The University of Queensland	Griffith University	Australian National University
2023	Div 2	The University of Melbourne	The University of Sydney	Curtin University	Bond University
2024		The University of Queensland	The University of Sydney	Deakin University	Macquarie University
2025		The University of Sydney	The University of Queensland	Deakin University	RMIT University

=== Tenpin Bowling ===
Year	Gold	Silver	Bronze	4th
2008	Australian College of Physical Education	La Trobe University	Monash University	The University of Sydney
2009	University of Newcastle	La Trobe University	University of New South Wales	The University of Sydney
2010	Curtin University of Technology	The University of Western Australia	Charles Darwin University	Monash University
2011	RMIT University	The University of New South Wales	Monash University	Curtin University
2012	RMIT University	Monash University	The University of Western Australia	The University of Canberra
2013	RMIT University	Monash University		
2014	RMIT University	Monash University		
2015	Western Sydney University	RMIT University	Monash University	
2016	Curtin University	RMIT University	The University of Western Australia	
2017	RMIT University	University of Adelaide	The University of Western Australia	
2022	Edith Cowan University	Western Sydney University	RMIT University	The University of New South Wales
2023	University of Technology Sydney	RMIT University	Western Sydney University	The University of Queensland
2024	RMIT University	Western Sydney University	University of Technology Sydney	The University of Queensland

=== Touch ===
==== Men ====
Year	Gold	Silver	Bronze	4th
2005	The University of Queensland	University of New South Wales	University of Newcastle	Queensland University of Technology
2006	University of Technology Sydney	Macquarie University	University of New South Wales	Queensland University of Technology
2007	Griffith University	The University of Queensland	Queensland University of Technology	University of New South Wales
2008	University of New South Wales	Griffith University	Queensland University of Technology	University of Technology Sydney
2009	Griffith University	University of Technology Sydney	University of New South Wales	University of Newcastle
2010	University of New South Wales	Monash University	Macquarie University	Queensland University of Technology
2012	James Cook University - Seahawks			
2022	University of Technology Sydney	Western Sydney University	University of Wollongong	Monash University
2023	Western Sydney University	Queensland University of Technology	University of Wollongong	University of Technology Sydney
2024	University of Wollongong	Bond University	The University of Sydney	University of Technology Sydney
2025	University of the Sunshine Coast	University of Wollongong	Monash University	Queensland University of Technology

==== Women ====
Year	Div	Gold	Silver	Bronze	4th
2005		Queensland University of Technology	Griffith University	University of Newcastle	University of Southern Queensland
2006		Queensland University of Technology	University of New South Wales	The University of Sydney	Macquarie University
2007		University of New South Wales	Griffith University	Queensland University of Technology	The University of Sydney
2008		University of New South Wales	Griffith University	The University of Sydney	Monash University
2009		Griffith University	University of New South Wales	Monash University	The University of Sydney
2010		University of New South Wales	University of Technology Sydney	The University of Sydney	Monash University
2022		University of Technology Sydney	Monash University	University of Melbourne	Griffith University
2023	Div 1	The University of Sydney	University of Technology Sydney	Charles Sturt University	University of Newcastle
2023	Div 2	The University of Melbourne	University of New South Wales	Griffith University	Southern Cross University
2024		Charles Sturt University	The University of Sydney	The University of Melbourne	Monash University
2025		University of Technology Sydney	The University of Sydney	Monash University	Charles Sturt University

==== Mixed ====
Year	Division	Gold	Silver	Bronze	4th
2005		University of Western Sydney	Australian College of Physical Education	Queensland University of Technology	University of the Sunshine Coast
2006		University of Western Sydney	Australian College of Physical Education	Charles Sturt University	The University of Melbourne
2007		University of Western Sydney	The University of Melbourne	The University of Western Australia	Macquarie University
2008		Queensland University of Technology	University of Wollongong	The University of Melbourne	Macquarie University
2009		Queensland University of Technology	The University of Queensland	The University of Melbourne	University of Wollongong
2010		Queensland University of Technology	The University of Melbourne	Australian Catholic University	Griffith University
2022	Div 1	The University of Newcastle	Queensland University of Technology	Macquarie University	Bond University
2022	Div 2	University of Wollongong	Charles Sturt University	University of Notre Dame Australia	University of Southern Queensland
2023	Div 1	The University of Newcastle	The University of Queensland	Queensland University of Technology	University of Sunshine Coast
2023	Div 2	Griffith University	Bond University	University of Wollongong	Deakin University
2024	Div 1	The University of Queensland	University of the Sunshine Coast	The University of Newcastle	Macquarie University
2024	Div 2	Charles Sturt University	Southern Cross University	The University of Notre Dame Australia	Bond University
2025	Div 1	The University of Queensland	Australian Catholic University	University of the Sunshine Coast; Charles Sturt University	
2025	Div 2	University of Technology Sydney	University of New South Wales	Bond University	The University of Sydney

=== Triathlon ===
Year	Division	Gold	Silver	Bronze	4th
2021	Women's	University of New South Wales Sydney	University of Technology Sydney	Western Sydney University	Australian National University
2021	Men's	The University of Sydney	University of Technology Sydney	University of the Sunshine Coast	Queensland University of Technology
2022	Women's	The University of Queensland	Queensland University of Technology	University of Sunshine Coast	Griffith University
2022	Men's	The University of Queensland	Queensland University of Technology	Griffith University	Bond University
2023	Women's	Monash University	Queensland University of Technology	The University of Melbourne	University of New South Wales
2023	Men's	Queensland University of Technology	Deakin University	RMIT University	The University of Melbourne
2024	Women's	The University of Queensland	Central Queensland University	University of the Sunshine Coast	
2024	Men's	University of the Sunshine Coast	The University of Queensland	Bond University; Griffith University	
2025	Women's	University of Technology Sydney	University of Wollongong	Australian Catholic University	Western Sydney University; The University of Newcastle
2025	Men's	The University of Sydney	University of Technology Sydney	UNSW Sydney	University of Wollongong

=== Ultimate Frisbee ===
Year	Division	Gold	Silver	Bronze	4th
2005		University of New South Wales	University of Newcastle	The University of Sydney	Macquarie University
2006		Macquarie University	The University of Queensland	The University of Melbourne	University of Newcastle
2007		The University of Queensland	Macquarie University	University of New South Wales	Monash University
2008		Flinders University	The University of Sydney	The University of Adelaide	The University of Melbourne
2009		The University of Queensland	The University of Sydney	Monash University	Flinders University
2010		Monash University	The University of Sydney	The University of Western Australia	University of Newcastle
2022	Div 1	The University of Sydney	RMIT University	University of Technology Sydney	Monash University
2022	Div 2	Macquarie University	The University of Melbourne	University of Newcastle	The University of Western Australia
2023	Div 1	The University of Sydney	University of New South Wales	The University of Melbourne	University of Wollongong
2023	Div 2	RMIT University	University of Tasmania	University of Technology Sydney	Macquarie University
2024		The University of Melbourne	University of Wollongong	Australia National University	University of Tasmania
2025		The University of Sydney	University of Tasmania	The University of Melbourne	University of New South Wales

=== Volleyball ===
==== Men ====
Year	Division	Gold	Silver	Bronze	4th
2005		Queensland University of Technology	The University of Queensland	The University of Melbourne	University of New South Wales
2006		Queensland University of Technology	University of Western Sydney	The University of Adelaide	Deakin University
2007		Queensland University of Technology	The University of Sydney	The University of Queensland	Queensland University of Technology 2
2008		Queensland University of Technology	The University of Sydney	The University of Melbourne	University of New South Wales
2009		Queensland University of Technology	The University of Sydney	Monash University	University of New South Wales
2010		The University of Western Australia	The University of Notre Dame Australia	Monash University	Curtin University of Technology
2022	Div 1	The University of Western Australia	Flinders University	Curtin University	Western Sydney University
2022	Div 2	Queensland University of Technology	University of New South Wales	Australian Catholic University	Deakin University
2023	Div 1	The University of Melbourne	The University of Queensland	Macquarie University	Griffith University
2023	Div 2	Flinders University	Monash University	The University of Adelaide	University of New South Wales
2024	Div 1	Queensland University of Technology	University of Technology Sydney	Western Sydney University	The University of Sydney
2024	Div 2	Griffith University	University of the Sunshine Coast	University of South Australia	La Trobe University
2025	Div 1	The University of Melbourne	University of Technology Sydney	Western Sydney University	The University of Sydney
2025	Div 2	Australian National University	The University of Adelaide	James Cook University	Curtin University

==== Women ====
Year	Division	Gold	Silver	Bronze	4th
2005		The University of Queensland	The University of Melbourne	Queensland University of Technology	The University of Sydney
2006		The University of Melbourne	RMIT University	Monash University	The University of Sydney
2007		Queensland University of Technology	The University of Melbourne	The University of Sydney	Edith Cowan University
2008		The University of Melbourne	Monash University	The University of Sydney	Queensland University of Technology
2009		The University of Melbourne	The University of Adelaide	The University of Queensland	Monash University
2010		The University of Sydney	Curtin University of Technology	University of New South Wales	The University of Melbourne
2022	Div 1	University of Sunshine Coast	Macquarie University	The University of Melbourne	University of New South Wales
2022	Div 2	Western Sydney University	The University of Western Australia	Edith Cowan University	The University of Western Australia 2
2023	Div 1	Macquarie University	Queensland University of Technology	Monash University	University of New South Wales
2023	Div 2	Deakin University	Edith Cowan University	Griffith University	University of South Australia
2024	Div 1	Monash University	Queensland University of Technology	University of the Sunshine Coast	Australian National University
2024	Div 2	La Trobe University	Avondale University	Australian Catholic University	Edith Cowan University
2025	Div 1	The University of Sydney	The University of Melbourne	Monash University	Australian National University
2025	Div 2	Australian Catholic University	Griffith University	University of South Australia	Edith Cowan University

=== Water Polo ===
==== Men ====
Year	Gold	Silver	Bronze	4th
1992	The University of Western Australia	University of New South Wales	University of Wollongong	
2005	The University of Sydney	The University of Melbourne	RMIT University	The University of Western Australia
2006	The University of Sydney	The University of Queensland	University of South Australia	The University of Melbourne
2007	The University of Queensland	Macquarie University	The University of Sydney	The University of Melbourne
2008	The University of Sydney	The University of Western Australia	The University of Queensland	The University of Melbourne
2009	Macquarie University	The University of Sydney	The University of Queensland	The University of Melbourne
2010	The University of Western Australia	The University of Sydney	The University of Melbourne	Macquarie University
2011	The University of Queensland	The University of Sydney	Macquarie University	Monash University
2012	The University of Sydney	Macquarie University	The University of Melbourne	University of New South Wales
2013	The University of Western Australia	The University of Sydney	University of Technology Sydney	The University of Melbourne
2014	The University of Sydney	University of Technology Sydney	University of New South Wales	The University of Melbourne
2015	University of Newcastle (Australia)	University of Technology Sydney	The University of Sydney	The University of Melbourne
2016	University of Technology Sydney	The University of Western Australia	The University of Notre Dame Australia	University of Newcastle (Australia)
2017	Queensland University of Technology	The University of Sydney	University of Newcastle (Australia)	University of Technology Sydney
2018	University of New South Wales	Queensland University of Technology	The University of Sydney	The University of Queensland
2019	University of Newcastle (Australia)	The University of Sydney	University of Technology Sydney	Queensland University of Technology
2022	The University of Sydney	Australian Catholic University	University of Western Australia	University of Technology Sydney
2023	University of Technology Sydney	The University of Sydney	The University of Queensland	University of Newcastle (Australia)
2024	Australian Catholic University	The University of Sydney	University of Technology Sydney	Australian National University
2025	The University of Sydney	University of Technology Sydney	The University of Queensland	The University of Newcastle

==== Women ====
Year	Gold	Silver	Bronze	4th
2005	The University of Sydney	The University of Queensland	The University of Western Australia	University of New South Wales
2006	The University of Sydney	The University of Adelaide	The University of Western Australia	The University of Melbourne
2007	The University of Sydney	Griffith University	The University of Western Australia	University of Newcastle (Australia)
2008	The University of Sydney	Queensland University of Technology	University of Technology Sydney	The University of Western Australia
2009	The University of Sydney	The University of Queensland	Queensland University of Technology	Griffith University
2010	The University of Sydney	University of New South Wales	University of Technology Sydney	The University of Western Australia
2011	The University of Sydney	Queensland University of Technology	University of New South Wales	University of Technology Sydney
2012	The University of Sydney	University of New South Wales	Macquarie University	Monash University
2013	Macquarie University	The University of Sydney	University of New South Wales	University of Technology Sydney
2014	Macquarie University	University of New South Wales	The University of Sydney	University of Newcastle (Australia)
2015	University of Newcastle (Australia)	Macquarie University	University of Technology Sydney	The University of Sydney
2016	Australian Catholic University	The University of Notre Dame Australia	The University of Sydney	University of Technology Sydney
2017	University of Technology Sydney	University of New South Wales	The University of Sydney	Queensland University of Technology
2018	Queensland University of Technology	Australian Catholic University	University of Technology Sydney	University of New South Wales
2019	University of Technology Sydney	Australian Catholic University	Queensland University of Technology	University of Newcastle (Australia)
2022	The University of Sydney	Australian Catholic University	University of Newcastle (Australia)	University of Wollongong
2023	Australian Catholic University	The University of Sydney	University of Newcastle (Australia)	The University of Queensland
2024	University of Technology Sydney	Australian Catholic University	The University of Sydney	The University of Queensland
2025	University of Technology Sydney	The University of Queensland	The University of Sydney	Australian Catholic University

== See also ==
- College sports
