= 2024 UniSport Nationals =

Edition of multi-sport event

- Host city: Canberra
- Country: Australia
- Organiser: UniSport
- Teams: 42
- Dates: 7 September – 13 September

The 2024 UniSport Nationals, was a national multi-sport event held from 7 September to 13 September 2024 in Canberra.

More than 6,000 student athletes from 42 Australian universities and tertiary institutions participated at the event. The University of Sydney topped the pennant tally, with the University of Technology Sydney and the University of Melbourne finishing second and third, respectively. Bond University was awarded the Doug Ellis Per Capita Trophy, and the Australian National University was awarded the John White Spirit Trophy.

== Venues ==
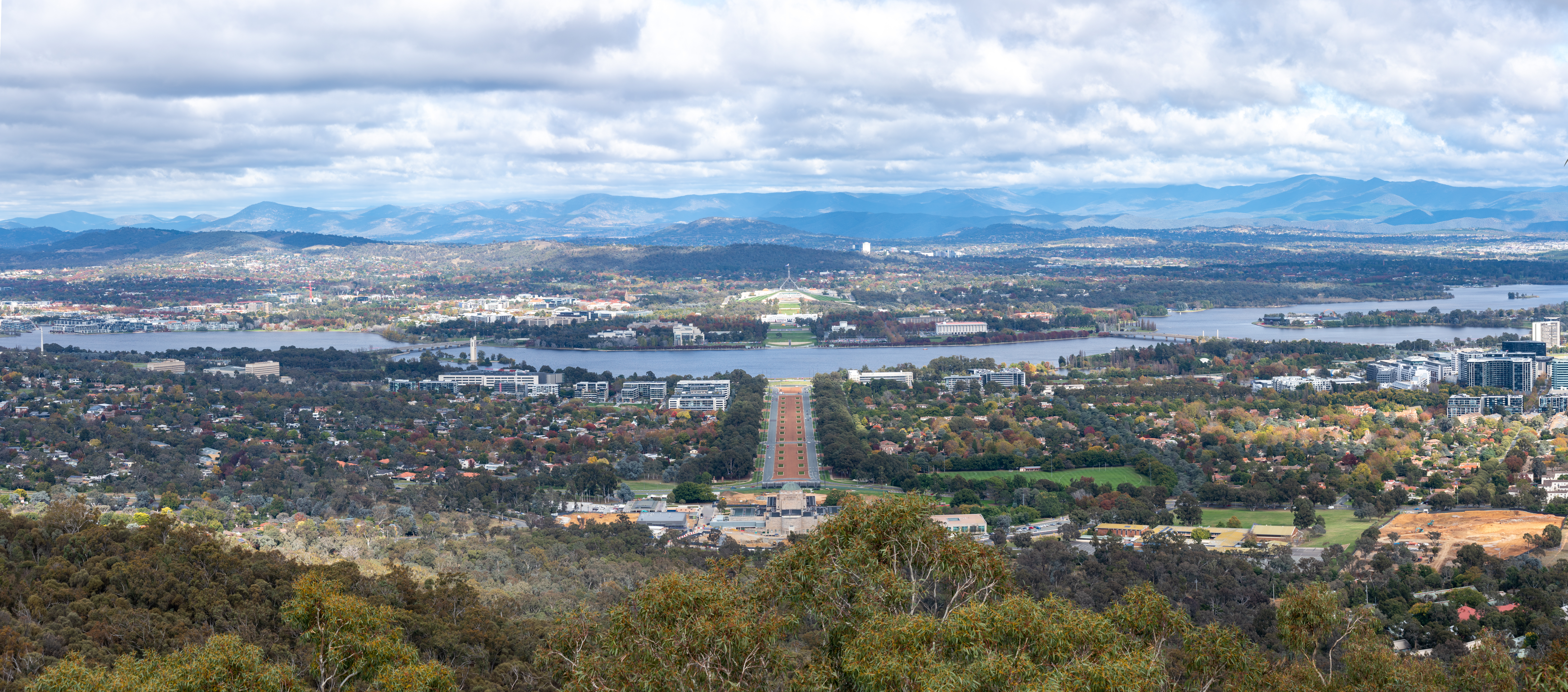
Canberra was selected as the host city for the 2024 UniSport Nationals.

The 2024 UniSport Nationals was hosted across a number of venues in Canberra.

Venue	Sports
ACT Netball Centre	Netball
AIS Aquatic Centre	Water polo
Australian National University	Lacrosse 5s, Rugby 7s, Ultimate, Volleyball
Belconnen Basketball Stadium	Basketball
Canberra Futsal Centre	Futsal
Deakin Sports Fields	Touch football
EPIC Showgrounds	Cheerleading, Fencing
Gungahlin Lakes Golf Club	Golf
Lake Burley Griffin	Sailing
National Hockey Centre	Hockey
Southwell Park	AFL 9s, Oztag
Stromlo Forest Park	Cycling
Tennis World Canberra	Tennis
University of Canberra	Badminton, Soccer, Squash
VACT Beach Volleyball Courts	Beach volleyball

== Pennant tally ==
2024 UniSport Nationals Overall Champion Pennant Tally
Rank	Institution	Gold	Silver	Bronze	Total
1	University of Sydney	18	13	8	39
2	University of Technology Sydney	9	8	4	21
3	University of Melbourne	6	4	4	14
4	University of New South Wales	6	2	6	14
5	Monash University	3	6	2	11
6	University of Queensland	3	2	4	9
7	University of Wollongong	3	2	0	5
8	Queensland University of Technology	2	2	2	6
9	Bond University	2	1	1	4
10	Australian Catholic University	2	1	0	3
10	RMIT University	2	1	0	3
12	Western Sydney University	1	3	3	7
13	Macquarie University	1	2	4	7
13	University of the Sunshine Coast	1	2	4	7
15	Australian National University	1	1	3	5
16	Charles Sturt University	1	1	2	4
16	Griffith University	1	1	2	4
18	Southern Cross University	1	1	0	2
19	University of Tasmania	1	0	0	1
20	James Cook University	0	2	3	5
21	University of Adelaide	0	2	0	2
21	University of Western Australia	0	2	0	2
23	Deakin University	0	1	4	5
24	La Trobe University	0	1	2	3
24	University of Newcastle	0	1	2	3
24	Victoria University	0	1	2	3
27	Australian College of Physical Education	0	1	0	1
28	University of Canberra	0	0	2	2
29	Flinders University	0	0	1	1
29	University of South Australia	0	0	1	1
31	Australian Defence Force Academy	0	0	0	0
31	Avondale University	0	0	0	0
31	Central Queensland University	0	0	0	0
31	Curtin University	0	0	0	0
31	Edith Cowan University	0	0	0	0
31	Federation University	0	0	0	0
31	International College of Management Sydney	0	0	0	0
31	Murdoch University	0	0	0	0
31	Swinburne University of Technology	0	0	0	0
31	Torrens University	0	0	0	0
31	University of New England	0	0	0	0
31	University of Notre Dame Australia	0	0	0	0
31	University of Southern Queensland	0	0	0	0
Totals (43 entries)		64	64	66	194

Last updated: 15 November 2024.
Source: 2024 UniSport Nationals Overall Champion Pennant Tally

== Awards ==
=== Overall ===
Overall Champion Trophy	Doug Ellis Per Capita Trophy	John White Spirit Trophy
University of Sydney	Bond University	Australian National University

Source: 2024 Overall Results

=== North region ===
Jodie Martin Trophy	Patron's Population Cup	Ron Leahy Trophy
University of Queensland	Bond University	University of Queensland

Source: 2024 Overall Results

=== South region ===
John Campbell Trophy	Hugh McKechnie Trophy	Spirit of the South Shield
University of Melbourne	Deakin University	Monash University

Source: 2024 Overall Results

=== East region ===
East Region Overall Champion	Ann Mitchell Trophy	Ben Tjen and Shane Alvisio Trophy
University of Sydney	Australian College of Physical Education	Australian National University

Source: 2024 Overall Results

=== West region ===
West Overall Champion University	West Overall Per Capita Champion	Western Spirit Trophy
University of Western Australia	University of Western Australia	Edith Cowan University

Source: 2024 Overall Results

== Partnerships ==
Principal partners	Supporting partners
ACT Government	New Balance

Source: Partners

== See also ==
- Sport in Australia
