= 2023 UniSport Nationals =

Edition of multi-sport event

- Host city: Gold Coast
- Country: Australia
- Organiser: UniSport
- Teams: 42
- Dates: 23 September – 29 September

The 2023 UniSport Nationals, was a national multi-sport event held from 23 September to 29 September 2023 on the Gold Coast, Queensland.

More than 6,000 student athletes from 42 Australian universities and tertiary institutions participated at the event. The University of Sydney topped the pennant tally, with the University of Technology Sydney and the University of Queensland finishing second and third, respectively. Bond University was awarded the Doug Ellis Per Capita Trophy, and Western Sydney University was awarded the John White Spirit Trophy.

== Venues ==
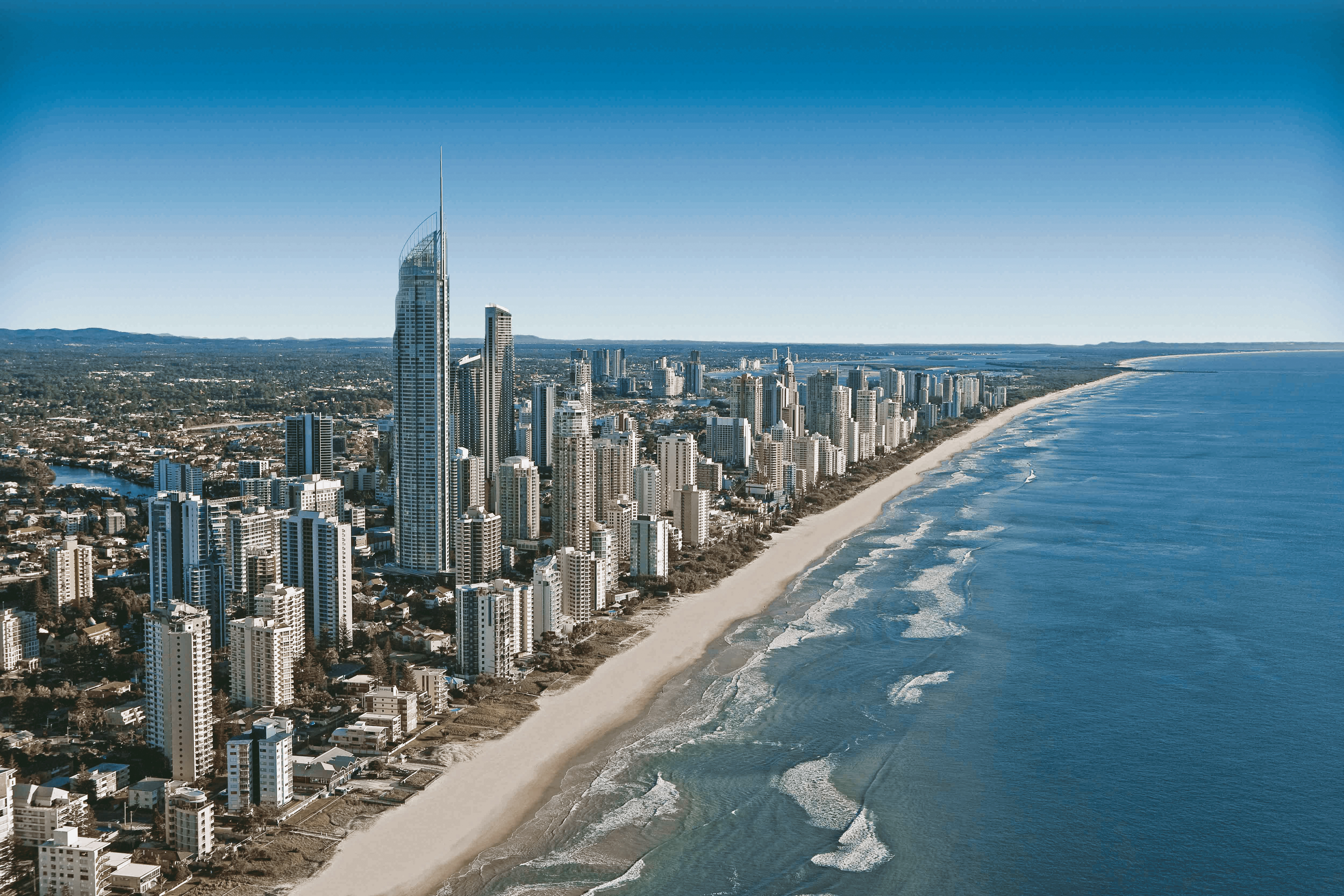
The Gold Coast was selected as the host city for the 2023 UniSport Nationals.

The 2023 UniSport Nationals was hosted across a number of venues on the Gold Coast.

Venue	Sports
Coomera Indoor Sports Centre	Basketball, Volleyball
Coomera Sports Park	Oztag, Ultimate
Gold Coast Aquatic Centre	Water polo
Gold Coast Cycling Centre	Cycling (road racing)
Gold Coast Hockey Centre	Hockey
Gold Coast Recreation Precinct	Kendo, Netball, Taekwondo
Gold Coast Seniors Tennis Club	Tennis
Keith Hunt Park	Soccer
Kurrawa Beach	Beach volleyball
Luke Harrop Cycling circuit	Cycling (criterium) (time trials)
Mallawa Sports Complex	Touch football
Oxenford Watersports Centre	Sailing
Palmer Colonial Golf Course	Golf
Queensland State Netball Centre	Judo
Queensland State Rowing Centre	Rowing
Robina Stadium	Rugby 7s, Rugby League 9s
Runaway Bay Indoor Stadium	Cheerleading
Somerset College	Lacrosse 5s
Southport Community Centre	Fencing
Tallebudgera Beach	Surfing

== Pennant tally ==
2023 UniSport Nationals Overall Champion Pennant Tally
Rank	Institution	Gold	Silver	Bronze	Total
1	University of Sydney	13	13	6	32
2	University of Technology Sydney	13	4	7	24
3	University of Queensland	7	10	2	19
4	University of Melbourne	7	7	4	18
5	Monash University	7	3	6	16
6	University of New South Wales	3	5	5	13
7	Australian Catholic University	3	1	0	4
8	La Trobe University	3	0	0	3
9	Queensland University of Technology	2	6	4	12
10	Macquarie University	2	0	5	7
11	University of Tasmania	2	0	1	3
12	RMIT University	1	4	3	8
13	University of Wollongong	1	2	4	7
14	University of Canberra	1	2	1	4
15	Bond University	1	1	1	3
16	Curtin University	1	1	0	2
16	Southern Cross University	1	1	0	2
18	Western Sydney University	1	0	5	6
19	University of Newcastle	1	0	3	4
20	Australian National University	1	0	2	3
21	Deakin University	0	3	2	5
22	Griffith University	0	2	2	4
23	University of Adelaide	0	2	0	2
24	Charles Sturt University	0	1	2	3
24	University of South Australia	0	1	2	3
26	University of the Sunshine Coast	0	1	1	2
27	James Cook University	0	1	0	1
27	Victoria University	0	1	0	1
29	Flinders University	0	0	1	1
29	University of Southern Queensland	0	0	1	1
31	Australian College of Physical Education	0	0	0	0
31	Avondale University	0	0	0	0
31	Central Queensland University	0	0	0	0
31	Edith Cowan University	0	0	0	0
31	Federation University	0	0	0	0
31	International College of Management Sydney	0	0	0	0
31	Murdoch University	0	0	0	0
31	Swinburne University of Technology	0	0	0	0
31	Torrens University	0	0	0	0
31	University of New England	0	0	0	0
31	University of Notre Dame Australia	0	0	0	0
31	University of Western Australia	0	0	0	0
Totals (42 entries)		71	72	70	213

Last updated: 2 May 2024.
Source: 2023 UniSport Nationals Overall Champion Pennant Tally

== Awards ==
=== Overall ===
Overall Champion Trophy	Doug Ellis Per Capita Trophy	John White Spirit Trophy
University of Sydney	Bond University	Western Sydney University

Source: 2023 Results

=== North region ===
Jodie Martin Trophy	Patron's Population Cup	Ron Leahy Trophy
University of Queensland	Bond University	Griffith University

Source: 2023 Results

=== South region ===
John Campbell Trophy	Hugh McKechnie Trophy	Spirit of the South Shield
University of Melbourne	University of Tasmania	Monash University

Source: 2023 Results

=== East region ===
East Region Overall Champion	Ann Mitchell Trophy	Ben Tjen and Shane Alvisio Trophy
University of Sydney	University of Technology Sydney	Western Sydney University

Source: 2023 Results

=== West region ===
West Overall Champion University	West Overall Per Capita Champion	Western Spirit Trophy
Curtin University	University of Notre Dame Australia	Edith Cowan University

Source: 2023 Results

== Partnerships ==
Principal partners	Supporting partners
Government of Queensland; City of Gold Coast	JanSport

Source: Partners

== See also ==
- Sport in Australia
