= 2022 UniSport Nationals =

Edition of multi-sport event

- Host city: Perth
- Country: Australia
- Organiser: UniSport
- Teams: 43
- Dates: 24 September – 30 September

The 2022 UniSport Nationals, was a national multi-sport event held from 24 September to 30 September 2022 in Perth, Western Australia.

More than 5,000 student athletes from 43 Australian universities and tertiary institutions participated at the event. The University of Sydney topped the pennant tally, with the University of Technology Sydney and the University of Melbourne finishing second and third, respectively. Bond University was awarded the Doug Ellis Per Capita Trophy, and Western Sydney University was awarded the John White Spirit Trophy.

== Venues ==
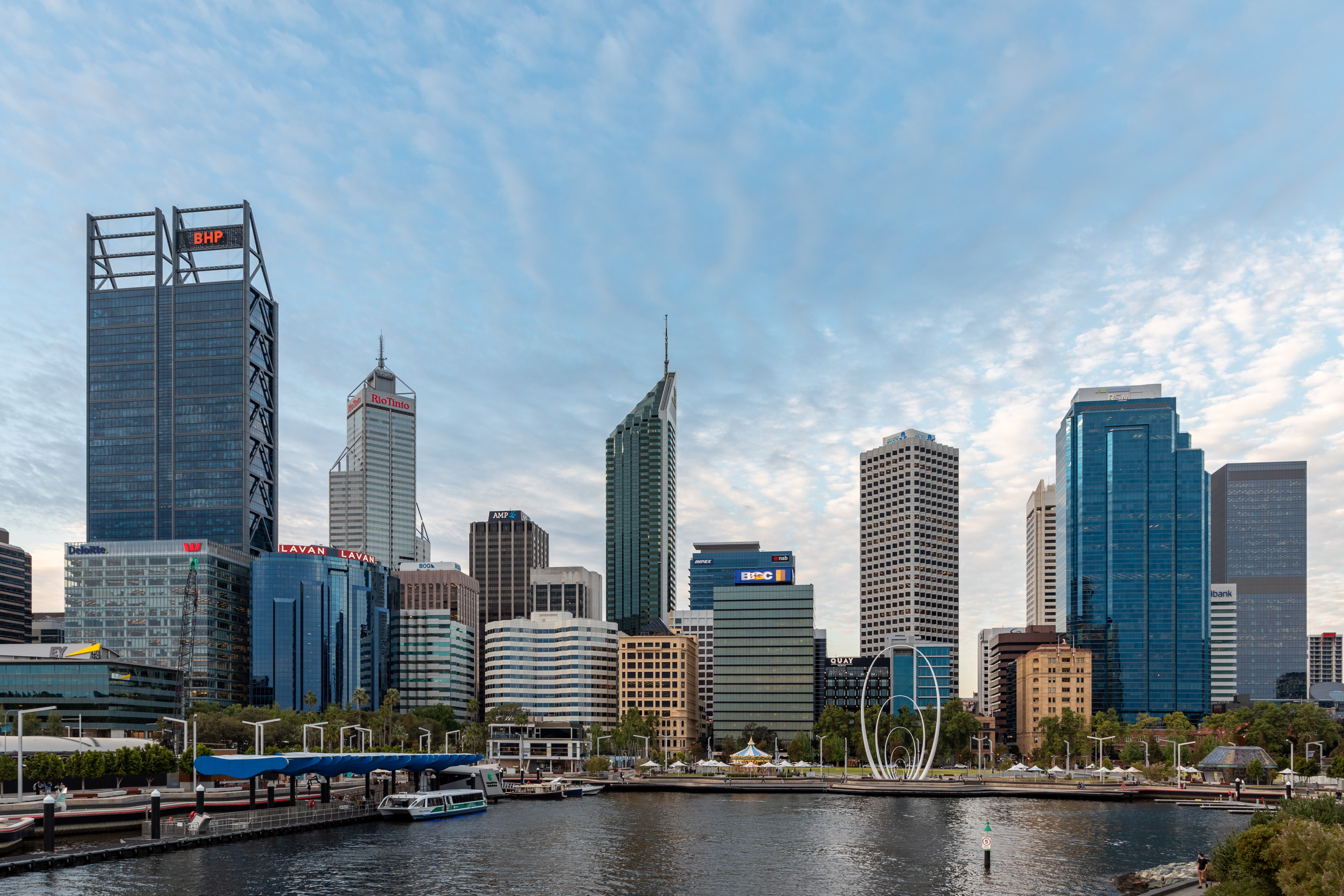
Perth was selected as the host city for the 2022 UniSport Nationals.

The 2022 UniSport Nationals was hosted across a number of venues in the Perth metropolitan area.

Venue	Sports
Baldivis	Cycling (road racing)
Belmont Saints Squash Centre	Squash
Champion Lakes Regatta Centre	Rowing
City Beach	Beach volleyball
Curtin University	Judo, Rugby sevens, Touch football, Volleyball
Edith Cowan University	Kendo, Lacrosse, Netball
Kingsway Indoor Stadium	Futsal
Murdoch University	Fencing, Ultimate
Perth Hockey Stadium	Hockey
Perth Superdrome	Netball, Volleyball, Water polo
Perth Motorplex	Cycling (criterium) (time trials)
Royal Perth Yacht Club	Sailing
Secret Harbour Golf Links	Golf
Sorrento Tennis Club	Tennis
Super Bowl Melville	Ten-pin bowling
Top Spins Table Tennis Club	Table tennis
University of Western Australia	Soccer, Hockey, Taekwondo, Water polo
WA Basketball Centre	Basketball

== Pennant tally ==
2022 UniSport Nationals Overall Champion Pennant Tally
Rank	Institution	Gold	Silver	Bronze	Total
1	University of Sydney	16	11	3	30
2	University of Technology Sydney	11	9	6	26
3	University of Melbourne	7	3	10	20
4	Curtin University	5	1	2	8
5	RMIT University	4	1	3	8
6	University of Queensland	3	0	1	4
7	University of New South Wales	2	7	2	11
8	University of Tasmania	2	0	1	3
9	Bond University	2	0	0	2
10	University of Western Australia	1	6	5	12
11	Western Sydney University	1	3	1	5
12	Macquarie University	1	2	4	7
13	La Trobe University	1	1	4	6
14	Australian National University	1	1	2	4
15	Deakin University	1	1	1	3
16	James Cook University	1	1	0	2
17	University of Sunshine Coast	1	0	2	3
18	Edith Cowan University	1	0	1	2
18	University of Newcastle	1	0	1	2
18	Victoria University	1	0	1	2
21	Southern Cross University	1	0	0	1
21	University of Canberra	1	0	0	1
23	Monash University	0	4	3	7
24	Queensland University of Technology	0	4	2	6
25	Australian Catholic University	0	4	1	5
26	University of Wollongong	0	3	2	5
27	Griffith University	0	1	3	4
28	University of Notre Dame Australia	0	1	1	2
28	University of South Australia	0	1	1	2
30	Flinders University	0	1	0	1
30	University of Adelaide	0	1	0	1
32	Murdoch University	0	0	2	2
33	Charles Sturt University	0	0	1	1
34	Australian College of Physical Education	0	0	0	0
34	Australian Defence Force Academy	0	0	0	0
34	Avondale University	0	0	0	0
34	Central Queensland University	0	0	0	0
34	Federation University	0	0	0	0
34	International College of Management Sydney	0	0	0	0
34	Swinburne University of Technology	0	0	0	0
34	Torrens University	0	0	0	0
34	University of New England	0	0	0	0
34	University of Southern Queensland	0	0	0	0
Totals (43 entries)		65	67	66	198

Last updated: 30 September 2022.
Source: 2022 UniSport Nationals Overall Champion Pennant Tally

== Awards ==
=== Overall ===
Overall Champion Trophy	Doug Ellis Per Capita Trophy	John White Spirit Trophy
University of Sydney	Bond University	Western Sydney University

Source: 2022 Results

=== North region ===
Jodie Martin Trophy	Patron’s Population Cup	Ron Leahy Trophy
University of Queensland	Bond University	University of New England

Source: 2022 Results

=== South region ===
John Campbell Trophy	Hugh McKechnie Trophy	Spirit of the South Shield
University of Melbourne	University of Tasmania	University of Melbourne

=== East region ===
East Region Overall Champion	Ann Mitchell Trophy	Ben Tjen and Shane Alvisio Trophy
University of Sydney	University of Technology Sydney	Western Sydney University

Source: 2022 Results

=== West region ===
West Overall Champion University	West Overall Per Capita Champion	Western Spirit Trophy
Curtin University	University of Western Australia	Edith Cowan University

Source: 2022 Results

== Partnerships ==
Major event partner	Partner universities	Presenting partners	Supporting partners
Government of Western Australia	Curtin University; University of Western Australia	City of Perth; City of Joondalup; City of Wanneroo	JanSport

== See also ==
- Sport in Australia
