= 2019 UniSport Nationals =

- Host city: Gold Coast
- Country: Australia
- Organiser: UniSport
- Teams: 43
- Dates: 28 September – 3 October

The 2019 UniSport Nationals, was a national multi-sport event held from 28 September to 3 October 2019 on the Gold Coast, Queensland, Australia.

More than 5,300 student athletes from 43 Australian universities and tertiary institutions participated at the event. The University of Sydney topped the pennant tally, with the University of Queensland and the University of Technology Sydney finishing second and third, respectively. Bond University was awarded the Doug Ellis Per Capita Trophy, and RMIT University was awarded the John White Spirit Trophy.

== Pennant tally ==
2019 UniSport Nationals Overall Champion Pennant Tally
Rank	Institution	Gold	Silver	Bronze	Total
1	University of Sydney	12	6	8	26
2	University of Queensland	10	6	9	25
3	University of Technology Sydney	8	9	9	26
4	University of Melbourne	8	9	8	25
5	RMIT University	7	3	1	11
6	University of New South Wales	6	3	6	15
7	Monash University	5	2	3	10
8	Queensland University of Technology	3	4	9	16
9	Griffith University	2	5	3	10
10	University of Newcastle	2	3	0	5
11	Deakin University	2	2	2	6
11	Macquarie University	2	2	2	6
13	Bond University	1	2	0	3
14	Southern Cross University	1	1	2	4
15	Charles Sturt University	1	1	1	3
16	University of Canberra	1	1	0	2
17	Central Queensland University	1	0	0	1
17	Federation University Australia	1	0	0	1
17	University of Adelaide	1	0	0	1
17	University of Wollongong	1	0	0	1
21	Australian Catholic University	0	3	4	7
22	La Trobe University	0	2	0	2
22	University of Southern Queensland	0	2	0	2
22	University of Western Australia	0	2	0	2
22	Victoria University	0	2	0	2
26	Australian National University	0	1	4	5
27	Torrens University	0	1	1	2
27	University of Tasmania	0	1	1	2
27	Western Sydney University	0	1	1	2
30	University of New England	0	1	0	1
30	University of South Australia	0	1	0	1
30	University of Sunshine Coast	0	1	0	1
33	Avondale University	0	0	1	1
33	International College of Management Sydney	0	0	1	1
35	Australian College of Physical Education	0	0	0	0
35	Australian Defence Force Academy	0	0	0	0
35	Curtin University	0	0	0	0
35	Edith Cowan University	0	0	0	0
35	Flinders University	0	0	0	0
35	James Cook University	0	0	0	0
35	Murdoch University	0	0	0	0
35	Swinburne University of Technology	0	0	0	0
35	University of Notre Dame Australia	0	0	0	0
Totals (43 entries)		75	77	76	228

Source: 2019 UniSport Nationals Overall Champion Pennant Tally

== Awards ==
=== Overall ===
Overall Champion Trophy	Doug Ellis Per Capita Trophy	John White Spirit Trophy
University of Sydney	Bond University	RMIT University

Source: 2019 overall results

=== North region ===
Jodie Martin Trophy	Patron’s Population Cup	Ron Leahy Trophy
University of Queensland	Bond University	Griffith University

Source: 2019 overall results

=== South region ===
John Campbell Trophy	Hugh McKechnie Trophy	Spirit of the South Shield
University of Melbourne	Australian Catholic University	RMIT University

Source: 2019 overall results

=== East region ===
East Region Overall Champion	Ann Mitchell Trophy	Ben Tjen and Shane Alvisio Trophy
University of Sydney	University of Technology Sydney	Western Sydney University

Source: 2019 overall results

=== West region ===
West Overall Champion University	West Overall Per Capita Champion	Western Spirit Trophy
University of Western Australia	University of Western Australia	Edith Cowan University

Source: 2019 overall results

== See also ==
- Sport in Australia
