= Australian University Sailing =

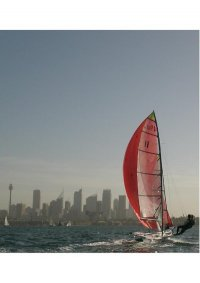
A 49er at the 2009 Australian University Fleet Racing Regatta

University sailing in Australia has gone through a process of growth, decline and now regrowth. Since the first inter-varsity competition in the 1960s in Adelaide, university sailing has played an important role in the Australian sailing scene. The first club to be established was the Adelaide University Sailing Club in 1959 and by the 1990s, many of the larger universities in Australia had either sailing or windsurfing clubs. The main classes of competition were Sharpies, Tasars, Lasers and 420s for sailing dinghies and the Original Windsurfer One-Design for the sailboard discipline. The clubs' organised regattas and social events were held each year which created an environment where sailing could be both social and competitive. University sailing made the sport accessible and financially easier for students without prior experience, while those with a competitive streak could compete in State and National class regattas as well as the all-important inter-varsity events.

2003 Australian University Games

In 2003 the Australian National University hosted the Australian University Games for Sailing held on Lake Burley Griffin in Canberra.

== Voluntary Student Unionism ==
The introduction of the Voluntary Student Unionism legislation in 2005 had a significant effect on university clubs and resulted in many of them being closed with their assets sold off, often at discount prices. The only clubs to survive or remain active from 2005 to 2009 were the clubs from the University of Adelaide, Queensland University of Technology, University of Queensland, University of Sydney, University of New South Wales (windsurfing), Australian National University and University of Tasmania. Even these clubs had very limited activity and resources.

== Building a Championship ==
In 2009, the Sydney University Sailing Club drove the establishment of a new national competition holding a university fleet-racing regatta in April and a teams racing regatta in October. The two events were a large success showing the need for a larger, more formally organised, national championship. The fleet regatta in April attracted students from 10 universities and was held over three days at Woollahra Sailing Club, in Rose Bay, Sydney. The teams racing regatta was held at Royal Prince Alfred Yacht Club, Newport (just north of Sydney), included 11 teams from 7 universities.

The new events were also successful in bringing together students from universities that did not have active clubs. The best examples of these are UTS and UNSW. These two universities once had large university sailing clubs but in the post VSU environment, had been dissolved. A new group of students from these universities was keen to re-establish clubs and from the beginning of 2010, began to recruit members. These clubs now work in cooperation with Sydney University to organise successful, social and competition events based from Woollahra Sailing Club.

The largest sailing club in the post VSU environment is now the University of Queensland Sailing Club, with over 150 members. The club now owns a one of largest fleets of Hobie Getaways in Australia, as well as several Pacers which are used for learn to sail courses and teams racing training. However, unlike many other Australian university sailing clubs, many of The University of Queensland Sailing Club's events now have a social sport focus.

== Australian University Games ==
After the success of the first two regatta events, Australian University Sport and Yachting Australia moved to establish a committee to look into the details of a new national championship. In early 2010, it was finally agreed that a new sailing championship should be established that should be included in the annual Australian University Games. The new competition would be made up of two three-day sections in the disciplines of teams racing and match racing.

The 2010 AUG was held in Perth with sailing as a demonstration sport. Every second year, the event returns to the Gold Coast. In 2011, sailing stayed on as a full sport, with medal points going towards university totals, in a 3-day teams racing format. UWA were the champions at both events.

The 2015 championship was won by the Australian Maritime College with UNSW and ANU taking out the other places. (Match racing - Elliott 6). The University of Queensland Sailing Club has won teams racing (Pacers) consecutively from 2016 to 2019.

== University Sailing Clubs ==
Active/Inactive	University Club	Website
Active	University of Adelaide	Site
Active	University of Queensland	Site
Inactive	Queensland University of Technology	
Active	University of Sydney	Site
Active	University of New South Wales	Site
Inactive	University of Technology, Sydney	
Active	Australian Defence Force Academy	Site
Active	Australian National University	Site
Active	University of Melbourne	Site
Active	RMIT University	Site
Active	Monash University	Site
Inactive	University of Tasmania	
Inactive	Australian Maritime College - UTAS	
Inactive	University of Western Australia	

== University Windsurfing Clubs ==
Active/Inactive	University Club	Website
Active	University of Sydney	Site
Active	University of New South Wales	Site
