= International College of Management, Sydney =

Australian private college

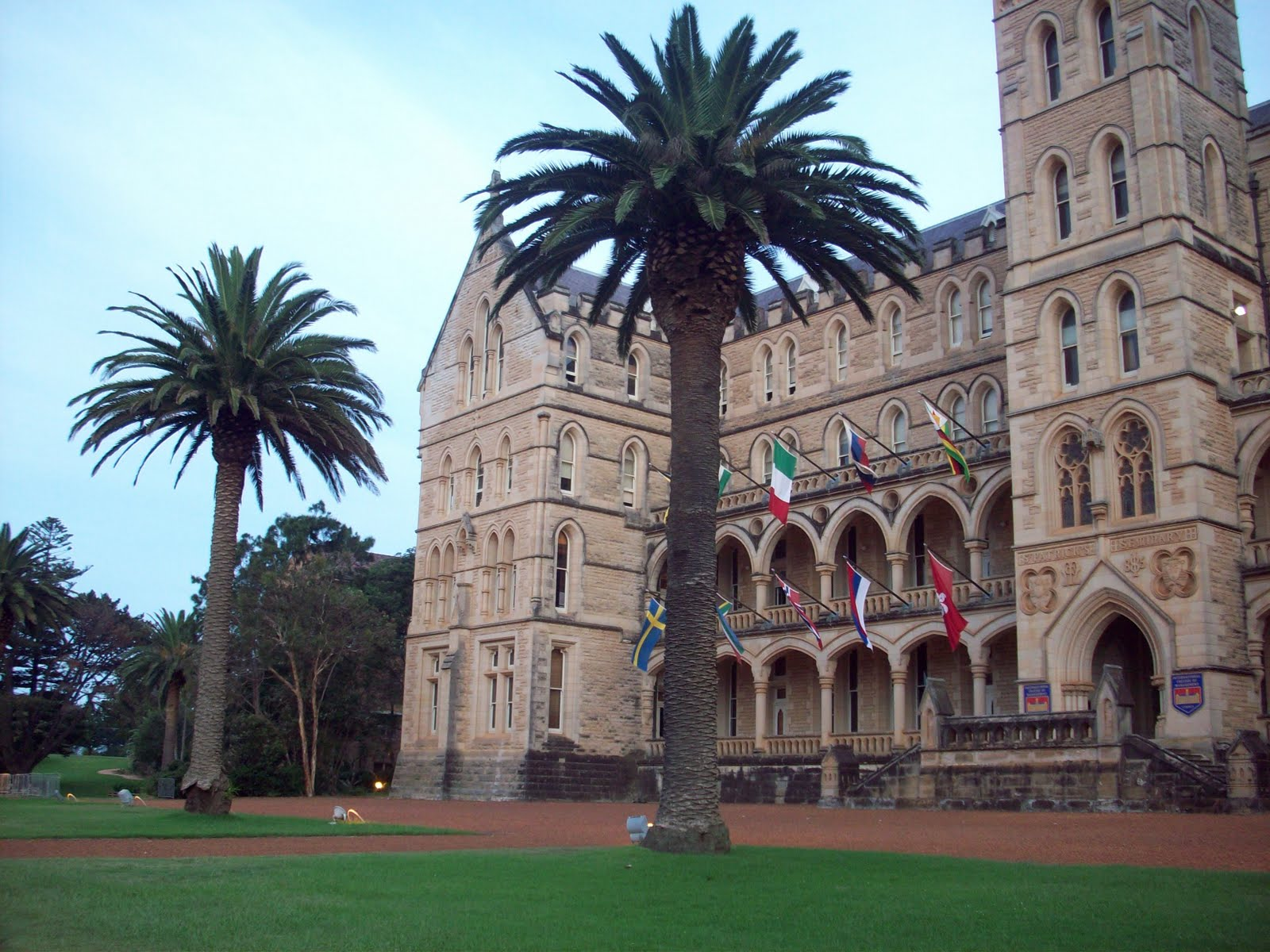
- Motto: Vision. Integrity. Purpose.
- Type: Private College
- Established: 1996
- Chairman: Darryl Courtney O'Connor
- President: Rowan Courtney O'Connor
- Location: Manly, New South Wales, Australia

The International College of Management, Sydney (ICMS) is a higher education provider offering degrees at the diploma level and above. ICMS offers English, Foundation, Diploma, Bachelor, Graduate Certificate and Master's degree programs in Business, Hospitality and Information Technology.

== History ==
The primary ICMS campus is situated on Sydney Harbour's North Head on St Patrick's Estate. It is located in the "Manly Castle", which formerly housed a seminary. The ICMS campus was used for exterior shots of Gatsby's mansion in the 2013 film adaptation of The Great Gatsby. Their second campus is located in the Manning Building, right in Sydney’s business district.

ICMS was one of the first six private universities included in the Universities Admissions Centre application process in 2012.

ICMS has been noted to be a significant contributor to the Northern Beaches economy and in 2018 ranked first in graduate employability in the event management and hospitality management sectors among Australian colleges.

In response to the COVID-19 pandemic, ICMS boosted scholarships and bursaries for domestic students after losing a significant portion of its students, who traditionally were international students.
