= UniSport =

Australian university sport governing body

UniSport Australia
- IOC nation: AUS
- Sport: University sports
- Official website: www.unisport.com.au

Demographics
- Number of University sports clubs: 43

Affiliations
- International federation: International University Sports Federation (FISU)
- FISU members page: www.fisu.net/about-fisu/member-associations-nusf/oceania/oceania/australia-aus
- FISU member since: 1967
- Continental association: Oceania University Sports Association

Headquarter
- Address: Milton, Queensland
- Country: Australia
- Chief Executive: Mark Sinderberry

Finance
- Company status: Not-for-profit organisation

UniSport Australia (UniSport) is the national body of university sports in Australia. They are responsible for the Australian team at the International University Sports Federation events.

== Competitions ==
=== UniSport Nationals ===
The UniSport Nationals is the flagship multi-sport competition of UniSport. It is held annually in Australia, with forty-three Australian universities participating in the competition. Since its inception, seven universities have won the overall champion title; University of Sydney (12), University of Melbourne (6), Monash University (3), University of Queensland (2), University of Technology Sydney (2), University of Western Australia (1) and University of Wollongong (1).

=== Nationals Snow ===
The Nationals Snow is the main multi-sport competition for sports played on snow.

=== Indigenous Nationals ===
The Indigenous Nationals is the main multi-sport competition for Indigenous Australians.

=== Leagues ===
==== University Basketball League ====
It was planned to create the University Basketball League (UBL) for 2020 but it was postponed due to the COVID-19 outbreak. The UBL resumed for the 2021 season.

==== Women's Uni 7s Series ====
The Women's Uni 7s Series established in 2017 is the main Rugby sevens league for women in Australia.

==== University Rugby League 9's ====
In 2019 the first edition of the University Rugby League 9's was held. Both the men's and women's division won the University of Newcastle.

== See also ==
- University and college sport
