= Australian College of Physical Education =

The Australian College of Physical Education (ACPE) is an independent specialist tertiary education institution in Sydney, Australia. The college offers degree programmes in PDHPE teaching, physical education, sports coaching, health and fitness, dance education, and sports management. The institute was founded in 1917, and is located at the Sydney Olympic Park.

The college was founded in 1917 (making it the fourteenth-oldest tertiary education institution in Australia), initially as a physical education training institution for young women (the college only began admitting male students in 1971). The college's founder was Frank Stuart – a swordsman, fencing instructor and physical training instructor, who had taught members of both the British and Russian Royal families, and went on to coach the Australian fencing teams for the 1950 Empire Games and the 1952 Olympic Games. The college was initially located within the premises of Normanhurst School in the Sydney suburb of Ashfield. It has an early connection with the Swords Club. (a connection recognised today through the college emblem), and in 1919 the club and the college were registered jointly as the ACPE and Swords Club Pty Ltd.

The college moved to new premises in Petersham in 1949, and then to Croydon in 1970. In 1995, the college moved into the Sydney Olympic Park at Homebush Bay, where the 2000 Olympic Games were held. Students at the college regularly use the Olympic Park's facilities, such as the Sports Centre, Aquatic Centre and Tennis Centre, for lectures and tutorials. Recently the college has moved to a brand new purpose-built campus in Sydney Olympic Park at 10 Parkview Drive.

== Courses ==
The college currently offers 11 undergraduate courses, and 6 postgraduate courses across 6 fields of study.

=== Sports Business ===
==== Undergraduate ====
- Associate Degree of Sport Business
- Bachelor of Sport Business (Leadership)

==== Postgraduate ====
- Graduate Certificate in Sport Management
- Graduate Certificate in Sport Operations Management
- Graduate Certificate in Leadership in Sport
- Graduate Certificate in Athlete Wellbeing and Management
- Graduate Certificate in Ethics and Integrity in Sport
- Graduate Diploma of Sport Management

=== Sports Coaching ===
==== Undergraduate ====
- Diploma of Community Sport and Movement
- Bachelor of Sport Coaching (Strength and Conditioning)
- Bachelor of Sport Coaching (Management)

=== Football ===
==== Undergraduate ====
- Diploma of Football (Development, Management and Performance)
- Associate Degree of Football (Development, Management and Performance)
- Bachelor of Football (Development, Management and Performance)

=== Health ===
==== Undergraduate ====
- Diploma of Sport and Exercise Science
- Bachelor of Health Science (Exercise)
- Bachelor of Physical Activity for Health (Pathway to Education)

=== Education ===
==== Undergraduate ====
- Bachelor of Education (Physical & Health Education)
- Bachelor of Dance Education

=== Dance ===
==== Undergraduate ====
- Bachelor of Dance Practice
- Bachelor of Dance Education
