= 2023 World Women's Handball Championship =

2023 edition of the World Women's Handball Championship

Tournament details
- Host countries: Denmark; Norway; Sweden
- Venues: 6 (in 6 host cities)
- Dates: 29 November – 17 December
- Teams: 32 (from 5 confederations)

Final positions
- Champions: France (3rd title)
- Runners-up: Norway
- Third place: Denmark
- Fourth place: Sweden

Tournament statistics
- Matches played: 112
- Goals scored: 6,013 (53.69 per match)
- Attendance: 344,399 (3,075 per match)
- Top scorers: (Czech Republic) Markéta Jeřábková (63 goals)

Awards
- Best player: (Norway) Henny Reistad

The 2023 IHF World Women's Handball Championship was the 26th edition of the championship, organised by the International Handball Federation (IHF) from 29 November to 17 December 2023 and jointly hosted by Denmark, Norway, and Sweden. It was the third time in handball history that the championship is jointly hosted, the first in Sweden, and also the first to be played in three countries.

France won their third title after a finals win over Norway. The bronze medal went to Denmark with a win over Sweden.

== Bidding process ==
After Russia's withdrawal, Denmark, Norway, Sweden, and Hungary entered their bids to host the tournament, which was awarded to the three Nordic countries by the IHF Council at its meeting held in Paris, France on 28 January 2017.

== Venues ==
The Nordic joint bid included the following six host cities and venues:

Herning	Frederikshavn	Stavanger
Jyske Bank Boxen; Capacity: 15,000	Arena Nord; Capacity: 2,800	DNB Arena; Capacity: 5,000
2023 World Women's Handball Championship is located in Scandinavia
Trondheim	Helsingborg	Gothenburg
Trondheim Spektrum; Capacity: 8,800	Helsingborg Arena; Capacity: 5,500	Scandinavium; Capacity: 12,000

The Hungarian bid included the same cities and venues as the bid that was presented for the 2021 championship.

== Qualification ==
Competition	Dates	Host	Vacancies	Qualified
Host countries	28 January 2017	—N/a	3	Denmark; Norway; Sweden
2022 European Championship	4–20 November 2022	Montenegro; North Macedonia; Slovenia	3	France; Montenegro; Netherlands
European qualification	2 November 2022 – 12 April 2023	—N/a	10	Croatia; Czech Republic; Germany; Hungary; Poland; Romania; Serbia; Slovenia; Spain; Ukraine
2022 African Championship	9–19 November 2022	Senegal	4	Angola; Cameroon; Congo; Senegal
2022 South and Central American Championship	15–19 November 2022	Argentina	2	Argentina; Brazil
2022 Asian Championship	24 November – 4 December 2022	South Korea	5^{[1]}	China; Iran; Japan; Kazakhstan; South Korea
2023 South and Central American Championship	28 February – 4 March 2023	Nicaragua	2	Chile; Paraguay
2023 Nor.Ca. Women's Championship	5–11 June 2023	Greenland	1	Greenland
Wild card	3 July 2023	—N/a	2^{[1]}	Austria; Iceland

1. If a country from Oceania (Australia) participating in the Asian Championships finished within the top 5, it would have qualified for the World Championships. As it finished sixth or lower, the place was transferred to the wild card spot.

== Qualified teams ==
Country	Qualified as	Qualification date	Previous appearances in tournament (Note: Bold indicates champion for that year, Italics indicates host for that year.)
Denmark	Co-hosts	28 January 2017	21 (1957, 1962, 1965, 1971, 1973, 1975, 1990, 1993, 1995, **1997**, 1999, 2001, 2003, 2005, 2009, 2011, 2013, 2015, 2017, 2019, 2021)
Norway	Co-hosts	28 January 2017	21 (1971, 1973, 1975, 1982, 1986, 1990, 1993, 1995, 1997, **1999**, 2001, 2003, 2005, 2007, 2009, **2011**, 2013, **2015**, 2017, 2019, **2021**)
Sweden	Co-hosts	28 January 2017	11 (1957, 1990, 1993, 1995, 2001, 2009, 2011, 2015, 2017, 2019, 2021)
France	Semifinalists of 2022 European Championship	15 November 2022	15 (1986, 1990, 1997, 1999, 2001, **2003**, 2005, 2007, 2009, 2011, 2013, 2015, **2017**, 2019, 2021)
Montenegro	Semifinalists of 2022 European Championship	15 November 2022	6 (2011, 2013, 2015, 2017, 2019, 2021)
Angola	Semifinalists of 2022 African Championship	16 November 2022	16 (1990, 1993, 1995, 1997, 1999, 2001, 2003, 2005, 2007, 2009, 2011, 2013, 2015, 2017, 2019, 2021)
Congo	Semifinalists of 2022 African Championship	16 November 2022	6 (1982, 1999, 2001, 2007, 2009, 2021)
Cameroon	Semifinalists of 2022 African Championship	16 November 2022	3 (2005, 2017, 2021)
Senegal	Semifinalists of 2022 African Championship	16 November 2022	1 (2019)
Netherlands	Top 6 of 2022 European Championship	16 November 2022	13 (1971, 1973, 1978, 1986, 1999, 2001, 2005, 2011, 2013, 2015, 2017, **2019**, 2021)
Argentina	Top two of 2022 Central and South American Championship	18 November 2022	11 (1999, 2003, 2005, 2007, 2009, 2011, 2013, 2015, 2017, 2019, 2021)
Brazil	Top two of 2022 Central and South American Championship	18 November 2022	14 (1995, 1997, 1999, 2001, 2003, 2005, 2007, 2009, 2011, **2013**, 2015, 2017, 2019, 2021)
Iran	Top five of 2022 Asian Championship	27 November 2022	1 (2021)
South Korea	Top five of 2022 Asian Championship	28 November 2022	19 (1978, 1982, 1986, 1990, 1993, **1995**, 1997, 1999, 2001, 2003, 2005, 2007, 2009, 2011, 2013, 2015, 2017, 2019, 2021)
Japan	Top five of 2022 Asian Championship	30 November 2022	20 (1962, 1965, 1971, 1973, 1975, 1986, 1995, 1997, 1999, 2001, 2003, 2005, 2007, 2009, 2011, 2013, 2015, 2017, 2019, 2021)
China	Top five of 2022 Asian Championship	30 November 2022	17 (1986, 1990, 1993, 1995, 1997, 1999, 2001, 2003, 2005, 2007, 2009, 2011, 2013, 2015, 2017, 2019, 2021)
Kazakhstan	Top five of 2022 Asian Championship	3 December 2022	6 (2007, 2009, 2011, 2015, 2019, 2021)
Chile	Top two of 2023 Central and South American Championship	3 March 2023	1 (2009)
Paraguay	Top two of 2023 Central and South American Championship	3 March 2023	4 (2007, 2013, 2017, 2021)
Ukraine	European play-off winner	11 April 2023	7 (1995, 1999, 2001, 2003, 2005, 2007, 2009)
Czech Republic	European play-off winner	11 April 2023	7 (1995, 1997, 1999, 2003, 2013, 2017, 2021)
Germany	European play-off winner	12 April 2023	14 (**1993**, 1995, 1997, 1999, 2003, 2005, 2007, 2009, 2011, 2013, 2015, 2017, 2019, 2021)
Slovenia	European play-off winner	12 April 2023	7 (1997, 2001, 2003, 2005, 2017, 2019, 2021)
Croatia	European play-off winner	12 April 2023	7 (1995, 1997, 2003, 2005, 2007, 2011, 2021)
Serbia	European play-off winner	12 April 2023	5 (2013, 2015, 2017, 2019, 2021)
Hungary	European play-off winner	12 April 2023	23 (1957, 1962, **1965**, 1971, 1973, 1975, 1978, 1982, 1986, 1993, 1995, 1997, 1999, 2001, 2003, 2005, 2007, 2009, 2013, 2015, 2017, 2019, 2021)
Poland	European play-off winner	12 April 2023	17 (1957, 1962, 1965, 1973, 1975, 1978, 1986, 1990, 1993, 1997, 1999, 2005, 2007, 2013, 2015, 2017, 2021)
Spain	European play-off winner	12 April 2023	11 (1993, 2001, 2003, 2007, 2009, 2011, 2013, 2015, 2017, 2019, 2021)
Romania	European play-off winner	12 April 2023	25 (1957, **1962**, 1965, 1971, 1973, 1975, 1978, 1982, 1986, 1990, 1993, 1995, 1997, 1999, 2001, 2003, 2005, 2007, 2009, 2011, 2013, 2015, 2017, 2019, 2021)
Greenland	Winner of 2023 Nor.Ca Championship	11 June 2023	1 (2001)
Austria	Wild card	3 July 2023	13 (1957, 1986, 1990, 1993, 1995, 1997, 1999, 2001, 2003, 2005, 2007, 2009, 2021)
Iceland	Wild card	3 July 2023	1 (2011)

== Marketing ==
The official logo and slogan was unveiled on 30 August 2022. It features the colours blue, red and yellow, representing the flag colours of hosts Sweden, Norway and Denmark, with the circles symbolising a ball flying through the air at a rapid speed. The slogan: "Aim to Excite" was also unveiled the same day. The logo was designed by Danish brand agency Urgent.Agency.

The official anthem of the competition is "Aiming For Number One", made and performed by Swedish DJ and producer Wahlstedt. It is not the first anthem Wahlstedt has made for a handball competition ("All for us" for the 2020 European Men's Handball Championship).

== Draw ==
The draw took place on 6 July 2023 in Gothenburg, Sweden.

=== Seeding ===
The seeding was announced on 3 July 2023.

Pot 1	Pot 2	Pot 3	Pot 4
Norway (assigned to C); Denmark (assigned to E); Montenegro (assigned to B); France (assigned to D); Sweden (assigned to A); Netherlands (assigned to H); Brazil; Germany (assigned to F)	Slovenia; Spain (assigned to G); Croatia; South Korea; Hungary; Romania; Poland; Czech Republic	Serbia; Japan; Ukraine; Greenland; Argentina; Angola; China; Cameroon	Congo; Senegal; Paraguay; Iran; Kazakhstan; Chile; Austria; Iceland

== Referees ==
23 referee pairs were selected on 27 October 2023. On 1 December 2023, Novica Mitrović and Miljan Vešović from Montenegro were called up from the reserve list to referee.

Referees
Algeria	Yousef Belkhiri; Sid Ali Hamidi
Argentina	María Paolantoni; Mariana García
Austria	Denis Bolic; Christoph Hurich
Bosnia and Herzegovina	Amar Konjičanin; Dino Konjičanin
Brazil	Bruna Correa; Renata Correa
Bulgaria	Georgi Doychinov; Yulian Goretsov
China	Cheng Yufeng; Zhou Yunle
Denmark	Mads Hansen; Jesper Madsen
Egypt	Yasmina El-Saied; Heidy El-Saied
France	Yann Carmaux; Julien Mursch
Germany	Maike Merz; Tanja Kuttler
Hungary	Kristóf Altmár; Márton Horváth

Referees
Kuwait	Dalal Al-Naseem; Maali Al-Enezi
Moldova	Alexei Covalciuc; Igor Covalciuc
Montenegro	Jelena Vujačić; Anđelina Kažanegra
Montenegro	Novica Mitrović; Miljan Vešović
Norway	Eskil Braseth; Leif Sundet
Romania	Cristina Lovin; Simona Stancu
Slovenia	Bojan Lah; David Sok
Serbia	Marko Sekulić; Vladimir Jovandić
Slovakia	Andrej Budzák; Michal Záhradník
South Korea	Koo Bo-ok; Lee Se-ok
Spain	Javier Álvarez; Ion Bustamante
Uruguay	Mathias Sosa; Cristian Lemes

== Preliminary round ==
The schedule was announced on 1 March 2023.

All times are local (UTC+1).

=== Group A ===
Pos	Team	Pld	W	D	L	GF	GA	GD	Pts	Qualification
1	Sweden (H)	3	3	0	0	84	59	+25	6	Main round Group I
2	Croatia	3	1	1	1	78	57	+21	3 (Note: Croatia 22–22 Senegal)	Main round Group I
3	Senegal	3	1	1	1	62	63	−1	3	Main round Group I
4	China	3	0	0	3	52	97	−45	0	President's Cup Group I

Source: Rankings
Rules for classification: 1) points; 2) head-to-head points; 3) head-to-head goal difference; 4) head-to-head number of goals scored; 5) goal difference.
(H) Hosts
Notes:

1 December 2023; 18:00	Croatia	22–22	Senegal	Scandinavium, Gothenburg; Attendance: 4,004; Referees: Hansen, Madsen (DEN)
1 December 2023; 18:00	Barišić 8	(9–11)	D. Camara 10	Scandinavium, Gothenburg; Attendance: 4,004; Referees: Hansen, Madsen (DEN)
1 December 2023; 18:00	1× (yellow card) 2× (suspension)	Report	1× (yellow card) 1× (suspension) 1× (red card)	Scandinavium, Gothenburg; Attendance: 4,004; Referees: Hansen, Madsen (DEN)

1 December 2023; 20:30	Sweden	36–24	China	Scandinavium, Gothenburg; Attendance: 8,407; Referees: Budzák, Záhradník (SVK)
1 December 2023; 20:30	Koppang 6	(22–8)	Liu Y. 6	Scandinavium, Gothenburg; Attendance: 8,407; Referees: Budzák, Záhradník (SVK)
1 December 2023; 20:30	1× (suspension)	Report		Scandinavium, Gothenburg; Attendance: 8,407; Referees: Budzák, Záhradník (SVK)

3 December 2023; 15:30	Croatia	39–13	China	Scandinavium, Gothenburg; Attendance: 3,061; Referees: B. Correa, R. Correa (BRA)
3 December 2023; 15:30	five players 5	(19–7)	Li 4	Scandinavium, Gothenburg; Attendance: 3,061; Referees: B. Correa, R. Correa (BRA)
3 December 2023; 15:30	1× (yellow card) 2× (suspension)	Report	2× (suspension)	Scandinavium, Gothenburg; Attendance: 3,061; Referees: B. Correa, R. Correa (BRA)

3 December 2023; 18:00	Senegal	18–26	Sweden	Scandinavium, Gothenburg; Attendance: 7,098; Referees: Lovin, Stancu (ROU)
3 December 2023; 18:00	Sagna 8	(12–14)	Roberts 6	Scandinavium, Gothenburg; Attendance: 7,098; Referees: Lovin, Stancu (ROU)
3 December 2023; 18:00	1× (yellow card) 2× (suspension)	Report	2× (yellow card) 2× (suspension)	Scandinavium, Gothenburg; Attendance: 7,098; Referees: Lovin, Stancu (ROU)

5 December 2023; 18:00	China	15–22	Senegal	Scandinavium, Gothenburg; Attendance: 3,714; Referees: Doychinov, Goretsov (BUL)
5 December 2023; 18:00	Jin 4	(9–9)	Sagna 8	Scandinavium, Gothenburg; Attendance: 3,714; Referees: Doychinov, Goretsov (BUL)
5 December 2023; 18:00	1× (yellow card) 2× (suspension)	Report		Scandinavium, Gothenburg; Attendance: 3,714; Referees: Doychinov, Goretsov (BUL)

5 December 2023; 20:30	Sweden	22–17	Croatia	Scandinavium, Gothenburg; Attendance: 8,538; Referees: Kuttler, Merz (GER)
5 December 2023; 20:30	Carlson 6	(9–7)	Šimara 5	Scandinavium, Gothenburg; Attendance: 8,538; Referees: Kuttler, Merz (GER)
5 December 2023; 20:30	1× (yellow card) 3× (suspension)	Report	4× (suspension)	Scandinavium, Gothenburg; Attendance: 8,538; Referees: Kuttler, Merz (GER)

=== Group B ===
Pos	Team	Pld	W	D	L	GF	GA	GD	Pts	Qualification
1	Montenegro	3	3	0	0	90	55	+35	6	Main round Group I
2	Hungary	3	2	0	1	92	56	+36	4	Main round Group I
3	Cameroon	3	1	0	2	57	87	−30	2	Main round Group I
4	Paraguay	3	0	0	3	61	102	−41	0	President's Cup Group I

Source: Rankings
Rules for classification: 1) points; 2) head-to-head points; 3) head-to-head goal difference; 4) head-to-head number of goals scored; 5) goal difference.

30 November 2023; 18:00	Montenegro	25–11	Cameroon	Helsingborg Arena, Helsingborg; Attendance: 731; Referees: Merz, Kuttler (GER)
30 November 2023; 18:00	Pavićević 5	(13–2)	Ateba 5	Helsingborg Arena, Helsingborg; Attendance: 731; Referees: Merz, Kuttler (GER)
30 November 2023; 18:00	3× (suspension)	Report	1× (yellow card) 2× (suspension)	Helsingborg Arena, Helsingborg; Attendance: 731; Referees: Merz, Kuttler (GER)

30 November 2023; 20:30	Hungary	35–12	Paraguay	Helsingborg Arena, Helsingborg; Attendance: 398; Referees: B. Correa, R. Correa (BRA)
30 November 2023; 20:30	Klujber, Szöllősi-Schatzl 5	(15–6)	Acuña, Portillo 4	Helsingborg Arena, Helsingborg; Attendance: 398; Referees: B. Correa, R. Correa (BRA)
30 November 2023; 20:30	1× (yellow card)	Report	1× (suspension) 2× (red card)	Helsingborg Arena, Helsingborg; Attendance: 398; Referees: B. Correa, R. Correa (BRA)

2 December 2023; 18:00	Paraguay	26–41	Montenegro	Helsingborg Arena, Helsingborg; Attendance: 964; Referees: Doychinov, Goretsov (BUL)
2 December 2023; 18:00	Acuña 5	(15–17)	Pavićević 9	Helsingborg Arena, Helsingborg; Attendance: 964; Referees: Doychinov, Goretsov (BUL)
2 December 2023; 18:00	1× (suspension)	Report	1× (yellow card) 1× (suspension)	Helsingborg Arena, Helsingborg; Attendance: 964; Referees: Doychinov, Goretsov (BUL)

2 December 2023; 20:30	Hungary	39–20	Cameroon	Helsingborg Arena, Helsingborg; Attendance: 589; Referees: Budzák, Záhradník (SVK)
2 December 2023; 20:30	Klujber 7	(18–8)	Nnomo 6	Helsingborg Arena, Helsingborg; Attendance: 589; Referees: Budzák, Záhradník (SVK)
2 December 2023; 20:30	2× (suspension)	Report	3× (suspension)	Helsingborg Arena, Helsingborg; Attendance: 589; Referees: Budzák, Záhradník (SVK)

4 December 2023; 18:00	Cameroon	26–23	Paraguay	Helsingborg Arena, Helsingborg; Attendance: 689; Referees: Lovin, Stancu (ROU)
4 December 2023; 18:00	Ebanga Baboga 9	(12–12)	Insfrán 7	Helsingborg Arena, Helsingborg; Attendance: 689; Referees: Lovin, Stancu (ROU)
4 December 2023; 18:00	7× (suspension)	Report	2× (suspension)	Helsingborg Arena, Helsingborg; Attendance: 689; Referees: Lovin, Stancu (ROU)

4 December 2023; 20:30	Montenegro	24–18	Hungary	Helsingborg Arena, Helsingborg; Attendance: 1,056; Referees: Hansen, Madsen (DEN)
4 December 2023; 20:30	Mugoša 8	(7–10)	three players 3	Helsingborg Arena, Helsingborg; Attendance: 1,056; Referees: Hansen, Madsen (DEN)
4 December 2023; 20:30	1× (yellow card) 4× (suspension)	Report	1× (yellow card) 4× (suspension)	Helsingborg Arena, Helsingborg; Attendance: 1,056; Referees: Hansen, Madsen (DEN)

=== Group C ===
Pos	Team	Pld	W	D	L	GF	GA	GD	Pts	Qualification
1	Norway (H)	3	3	0	0	121	62	+59	6	Main round Group II
2	Austria	3	2	0	1	101	97	+4	4	Main round Group II
3	South Korea	3	1	0	2	79	79	0	2	Main round Group II
4	Greenland	3	0	0	3	50	113	−63	0	President's Cup Group I

Source: Rankings
Rules for classification: 1) points; 2) head-to-head points; 3) head-to-head goal difference; 4) head-to-head number of goals scored; 5) goal difference.
(H) Hosts

29 November 2023; 18:00	South Korea	29–30	Austria	DNB Arena, Stavanger; Attendance: 2,104; Referees: Jovandić, Sekulić (SRB)
29 November 2023; 18:00	Woo 11	(12–16)	K. Pandza 8	DNB Arena, Stavanger; Attendance: 2,104; Referees: Jovandić, Sekulić (SRB)
29 November 2023; 18:00	5× (suspension) 1× (red card)	Report	3× (suspension)	DNB Arena, Stavanger; Attendance: 2,104; Referees: Jovandić, Sekulić (SRB)

29 November 2023; 20:30	Norway	43–11	Greenland	DNB Arena, Stavanger; Attendance: 3,345; Referees: García, Paolantoni (ARG)
29 November 2023; 20:30	Herrem 7	(19–7)	Bjerge 4	DNB Arena, Stavanger; Attendance: 3,345; Referees: García, Paolantoni (ARG)
29 November 2023; 20:30	1× (yellow card) 1× (suspension)	Report	2× (suspension)	DNB Arena, Stavanger; Attendance: 3,345; Referees: García, Paolantoni (ARG)

1 December 2023; 18:00	South Korea	27–16	Greenland	DNB Arena, Stavanger; Attendance: 2,141; Referees: H. El-Saied, Y. El-Saied (EGY)
1 December 2023; 18:00	Gim, Woo 4	(15–6)	Rothberg 4	DNB Arena, Stavanger; Attendance: 2,141; Referees: H. El-Saied, Y. El-Saied (EGY)
1 December 2023; 18:00	2× (suspension) 1× (red card)	Report	3× (suspension)	DNB Arena, Stavanger; Attendance: 2,141; Referees: H. El-Saied, Y. El-Saied (EGY)

1 December 2023; 20:30	Austria	28–45	Norway	DNB Arena, Stavanger; Attendance: 3,451; Referees: Álvarez, Bustamante (ESP)
1 December 2023; 20:30	I. Ivančok 6	(12–21)	Reistad 10	DNB Arena, Stavanger; Attendance: 3,451; Referees: Álvarez, Bustamante (ESP)
1 December 2023; 20:30	1× (suspension)	Report	1× (yellow card) 5× (suspension)	DNB Arena, Stavanger; Attendance: 3,451; Referees: Álvarez, Bustamante (ESP)

3 December 2023; 18:00	Greenland	23–43	Austria	DNB Arena, Stavanger; Attendance: 1,850; Referees: A. Konjičanin, D. Konjičanin (BIH)
3 December 2023; 18:00	Bjerge, Hansen 5	(13–20)	K. Pandza 8	DNB Arena, Stavanger; Attendance: 1,850; Referees: A. Konjičanin, D. Konjičanin (BIH)
3 December 2023; 18:00	3× (suspension)	Report	3× (suspension)	DNB Arena, Stavanger; Attendance: 1,850; Referees: A. Konjičanin, D. Konjičanin (BIH)

3 December 2023; 20:30	Norway	33–23	South Korea	DNB Arena, Stavanger; Attendance: 3,456; Referees: Lemes, Sosa (URU)
3 December 2023; 20:30	Herrem 7	(20–11)	Shin 6	DNB Arena, Stavanger; Attendance: 3,456; Referees: Lemes, Sosa (URU)
3 December 2023; 20:30	2× (suspension)	Report	1× (yellow card) 2× (suspension)	DNB Arena, Stavanger; Attendance: 3,456; Referees: Lemes, Sosa (URU)

=== Group D ===
Pos	Team	Pld	W	D	L	GF	GA	GD	Pts	Qualification
1	France	3	3	0	0	92	78	+14	6	Main round Group II
2	Slovenia	3	2	0	1	87	79	+8	4	Main round Group II
3	Angola	3	0	1	2	79	86	−7	1 (Note: Angola 26–26 Iceland)	Main round Group II
4	Iceland	3	0	1	2	72	87	−15	1	President's Cup Group I

Source: Rankings
Rules for classification: 1) points; 2) head-to-head points; 3) head-to-head goal difference; 4) head-to-head number of goals scored; 5) goal difference.
Notes:

30 November 2023; 18:00	Slovenia	30–24	Iceland	DNB Arena, Stavanger; Attendance: 750; Referees: Lemes, Sosa (URU)
30 November 2023; 18:00	Ljepoja 8	(16–13)	three players 5	DNB Arena, Stavanger; Attendance: 750; Referees: Lemes, Sosa (URU)
30 November 2023; 18:00	4× (suspension)	Report	4× (suspension) 1× (red card)	DNB Arena, Stavanger; Attendance: 750; Referees: Lemes, Sosa (URU)

30 November 2023; 20:30	France	30–29	Angola	DNB Arena, Stavanger; Attendance: 1,830; Referees: A. Konjičanin, D. Konjičanin (BIH)
30 November 2023; 20:30	Toublanc, Valentini 6	(18–15)	Guialo 6	DNB Arena, Stavanger; Attendance: 1,830; Referees: A. Konjičanin, D. Konjičanin (BIH)
30 November 2023; 20:30	3× (suspension)	Report	5× (suspension)	DNB Arena, Stavanger; Attendance: 1,830; Referees: A. Konjičanin, D. Konjičanin (BIH)

2 December 2023; 15:30	Slovenia	30–24	Angola	DNB Arena, Stavanger; Attendance: 816; Referees: García, Paolantoni (ARG)
2 December 2023; 15:30	Varagić 5	(14–11)	Guialo 6	DNB Arena, Stavanger; Attendance: 816; Referees: García, Paolantoni (ARG)
2 December 2023; 15:30	2× (yellow card) 4× (suspension)	Report	5× (suspension) 1× (red card)	DNB Arena, Stavanger; Attendance: 816; Referees: García, Paolantoni (ARG)

2 December 2023; 18:00	Iceland	22–31	France	DNB Arena, Stavanger; Attendance: 2,414; Referees: Jovandić, Sekulić (SRB)
2 December 2023; 18:00	Erlingsdóttir 7	(10–20)	Bouktit, Kanor 5	DNB Arena, Stavanger; Attendance: 2,414; Referees: Jovandić, Sekulić (SRB)
2 December 2023; 18:00	1× (yellow card) 2× (suspension)	Report	3× (suspension)	DNB Arena, Stavanger; Attendance: 2,414; Referees: Jovandić, Sekulić (SRB)

4 December 2023; 18:00	Angola	26–26	Iceland	DNB Arena, Stavanger; Attendance: 854; Referees: H. El-Saied, Y. El-Saied (EGY)
4 December 2023; 18:00	Gabriel 6	(15–14)	Erlingsdóttir 6	DNB Arena, Stavanger; Attendance: 854; Referees: H. El-Saied, Y. El-Saied (EGY)
4 December 2023; 18:00	3× (suspension)	Report	1× (yellow card) 2× (suspension)	DNB Arena, Stavanger; Attendance: 854; Referees: H. El-Saied, Y. El-Saied (EGY)

4 December 2023; 21:00	France	31–27	Slovenia	DNB Arena, Stavanger; Attendance: 883; Referees: Álvarez, Bustamante (ESP)
4 December 2023; 21:00	Grandveau 6	(17–15)	Stanko 7	DNB Arena, Stavanger; Attendance: 883; Referees: Álvarez, Bustamante (ESP)
4 December 2023; 21:00	1× (yellow card) 1× (suspension)	Report	1× (yellow card) 5× (suspension)	DNB Arena, Stavanger; Attendance: 883; Referees: Álvarez, Bustamante (ESP)

=== Group E ===
Pos	Team	Pld	W	D	L	GF	GA	GD	Pts	Qualification
1	Denmark (H)	3	3	0	0	110	55	+55	6	Main round Group III
2	Romania	3	2	0	1	104	86	+18	4	Main round Group III
3	Serbia	3	1	0	2	79	78	+1	2	Main round Group III
4	Chile	3	0	0	3	46	120	−74	0	President's Cup Group II

Source: Rankings
Rules for classification: 1) points; 2) head-to-head points; 3) head-to-head goal difference; 4) head-to-head number of goals scored; 5) goal difference.
(H) Hosts

1 December 2023; 18:00	Romania	44–19	Chile	Jyske Bank Boxen, Herning; Attendance: 9,582; Referees: Cheng, Zhou (CHN)
1 December 2023; 18:00	Buceschi 6	(25–6)	Parra, Paul 4	Jyske Bank Boxen, Herning; Attendance: 9,582; Referees: Cheng, Zhou (CHN)
1 December 2023; 18:00	3× (suspension)	Report	1× (suspension)	Jyske Bank Boxen, Herning; Attendance: 9,582; Referees: Cheng, Zhou (CHN)

1 December 2023; 20:30	Denmark	25–21	Serbia	Jyske Bank Boxen, Herning; Attendance: 12,389; Referees: A. Covalciuc, I. Covalciuc (MDA)
1 December 2023; 20:30	Friis, Jørgensen 5	(10–12)	three players 5	Jyske Bank Boxen, Herning; Attendance: 12,389; Referees: A. Covalciuc, I. Covalciuc (MDA)
1 December 2023; 20:30	1× (suspension)	Report	1× (yellow card) 7× (suspension) 1× (red card)	Jyske Bank Boxen, Herning; Attendance: 12,389; Referees: A. Covalciuc, I. Covalciuc (MDA)

3 December 2023; 18:00	Romania	37–28	Serbia	Jyske Bank Boxen, Herning; Attendance: 5,907; Referees: Koo, Lee (KOR)
3 December 2023; 18:00	Buceschi 8	(19–13)	Jovović, Laništanin 5	Jyske Bank Boxen, Herning; Attendance: 5,907; Referees: Koo, Lee (KOR)
3 December 2023; 18:00	2× (suspension)	Report	3× (yellow card) 2× (suspension)	Jyske Bank Boxen, Herning; Attendance: 5,907; Referees: Koo, Lee (KOR)

3 December 2023; 20:30	Chile	11–46	Denmark	Jyske Bank Boxen, Herning; Attendance: 7,622; Referees: Kažanegra, Vujačić (MNE)
3 December 2023; 20:30	Lovera, Paul 3	(5–20)	Scaglione 7	Jyske Bank Boxen, Herning; Attendance: 7,622; Referees: Kažanegra, Vujačić (MNE)
3 December 2023; 20:30	1× (suspension)	Report	4× (suspension)	Jyske Bank Boxen, Herning; Attendance: 7,622; Referees: Kažanegra, Vujačić (MNE)

5 December 2023; 18:00	Serbia	30–16	Chile	Jyske Bank Boxen, Herning; Attendance: 7,438; Referees: Al-Enezi, Al-Naseem (KUW)
5 December 2023; 18:00	Stamenić 7	(10–6)	Álvarez 4	Jyske Bank Boxen, Herning; Attendance: 7,438; Referees: Al-Enezi, Al-Naseem (KUW)
5 December 2023; 18:00	1× (yellow card) 3× (suspension)	Report	2× (suspension)	Jyske Bank Boxen, Herning; Attendance: 7,438; Referees: Al-Enezi, Al-Naseem (KUW)

5 December 2023; 20:30	Denmark	39–23	Romania	Jyske Bank Boxen, Herning; Attendance: 10,788; Referees: Lah, Sok (SLO)
5 December 2023; 20:30	Jørgensen 10	(21–10)	Lixăndroiu 5	Jyske Bank Boxen, Herning; Attendance: 10,788; Referees: Lah, Sok (SLO)
5 December 2023; 20:30	1× (yellow card) 3× (suspension)	Report	1× (yellow card) 3× (suspension)	Jyske Bank Boxen, Herning; Attendance: 10,788; Referees: Lah, Sok (SLO)

=== Group F ===
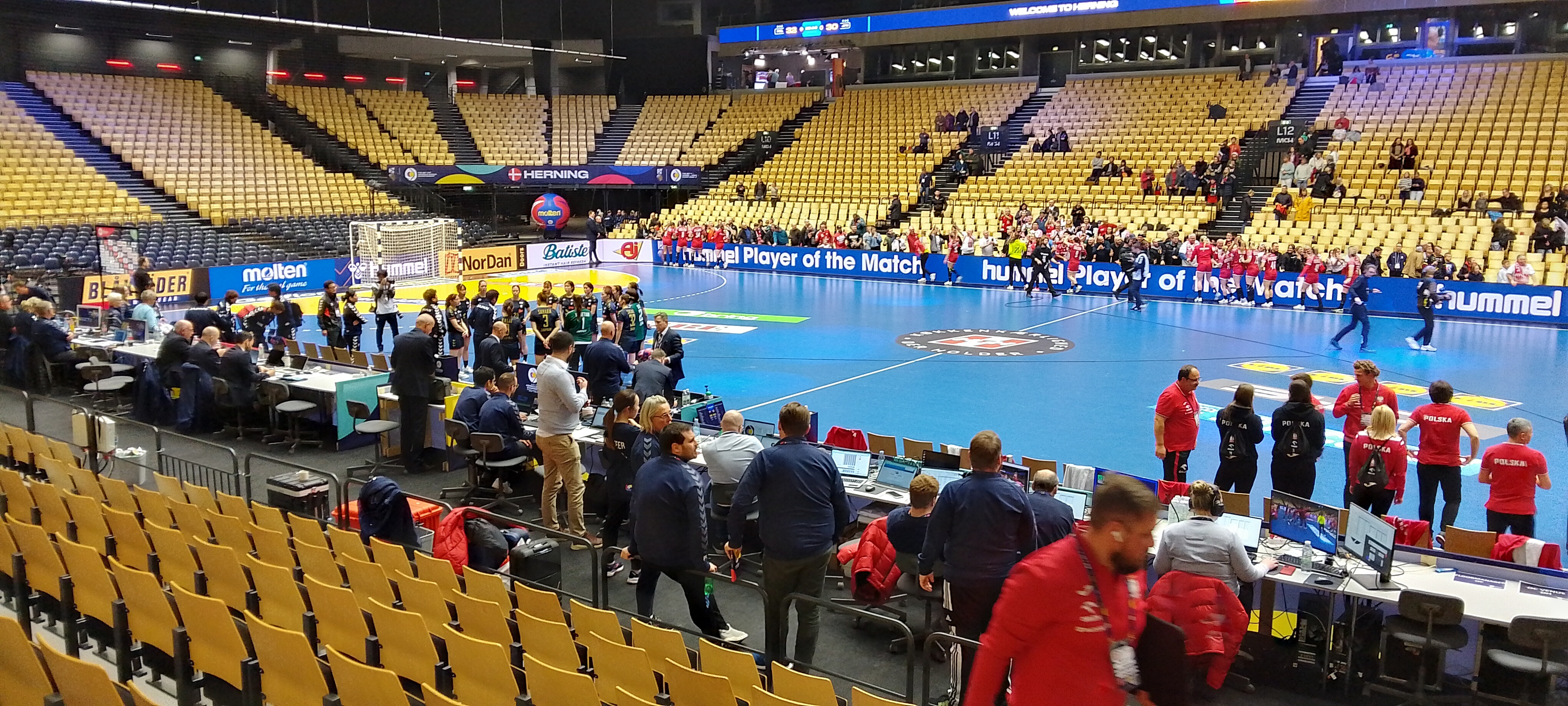
Poland vs Japan on 2 December 2023

Pos	Team	Pld	W	D	L	GF	GA	GD	Pts	Qualification
1	Germany	3	3	0	0	109	69	+40	6	Main round Group III
2	Poland	3	2	0	1	84	78	+6	4	Main round Group III
3	Japan	3	1	0	2	102	73	+29	2	Main round Group III
4	Iran	3	0	0	3	47	122	−75	0	President's Cup Group II

Source: Rankings
Rules for classification: 1) points; 2) head-to-head points; 3) head-to-head goal difference; 4) head-to-head number of goals scored; 5) goal difference.

30 November 2023; 18:00	Germany	31–30	Japan	Jyske Bank Boxen, Herning; Attendance: 1,237; Referees: Carmaux, Mursch (FRA)
30 November 2023; 18:00	Grijseels 7	(18–17)	Aizawa 10	Jyske Bank Boxen, Herning; Attendance: 1,237; Referees: Carmaux, Mursch (FRA)
30 November 2023; 18:00	2× (yellow card) 4× (suspension)	Report	2× (suspension)	Jyske Bank Boxen, Herning; Attendance: 1,237; Referees: Carmaux, Mursch (FRA)

30 November 2023; 20:30	Poland	35–15	Iran	Jyske Bank Boxen, Herning; Attendance: 1,405; Referees: Altmár, Horváth (HUN)
30 November 2023; 20:30	Balsam, Nocuń 6	(18–8)	Merikh 6	Jyske Bank Boxen, Herning; Attendance: 1,405; Referees: Altmár, Horváth (HUN)
30 November 2023; 20:30	1× (yellow card) 3× (suspension)	Report	2× (suspension) 1× (red card)	Jyske Bank Boxen, Herning; Attendance: 1,405; Referees: Altmár, Horváth (HUN)

2 December 2023; 18:00	Iran	22–45	Germany	Jyske Bank Boxen, Herning; Attendance: 1,332; Referees: Mitrović, Vešović (MNE)
2 December 2023; 18:00	Merikh 8	(12–25)	Stockschläder 8	Jyske Bank Boxen, Herning; Attendance: 1,332; Referees: Mitrović, Vešović (MNE)
2 December 2023; 18:00	4× (suspension)	Report	1× (yellow card) 4× (suspension)	Jyske Bank Boxen, Herning; Attendance: 1,332; Referees: Mitrović, Vešović (MNE)

2 December 2023; 20:30	Poland	32–30	Japan	Jyske Bank Boxen, Herning; Attendance: 1,490; Referees: Lah, Sok (SLO)
2 December 2023; 20:30	Kobylińska 11	(15–15)	Sasaki 6	Jyske Bank Boxen, Herning; Attendance: 1,490; Referees: Lah, Sok (SLO)
2 December 2023; 20:30	5× (suspension)	Report	1× (yellow card) 2× (suspension)	Jyske Bank Boxen, Herning; Attendance: 1,490; Referees: Lah, Sok (SLO)

4 December 2023; 18:00	Japan	42–10	Iran	Jyske Bank Boxen, Herning; Attendance: 636; Referees: Bolic, Hurich (AUT)
4 December 2023; 18:00	three players 5	(20–3)	Koudzarifarahani 3	Jyske Bank Boxen, Herning; Attendance: 636; Referees: Bolic, Hurich (AUT)
4 December 2023; 18:00	4× (suspension)	Report	3× (suspension)	Jyske Bank Boxen, Herning; Attendance: 636; Referees: Bolic, Hurich (AUT)

4 December 2023; 20:30	Germany	33–17	Poland	Jyske Bank Boxen, Herning; Attendance: 1,021; Referees: A. Covalciuc, I. Covalciuc (MDA)
4 December 2023; 20:30	Grijseels 7	(19–10)	Kobylińska 3	Jyske Bank Boxen, Herning; Attendance: 1,021; Referees: A. Covalciuc, I. Covalciuc (MDA)
4 December 2023; 20:30	5× (suspension)	Report	4× (suspension)	Jyske Bank Boxen, Herning; Attendance: 1,021; Referees: A. Covalciuc, I. Covalciuc (MDA)

=== Group G ===
Pos	Team	Pld	W	D	L	GF	GA	GD	Pts	Qualification
1	Spain	3	3	0	0	93	62	+31	6	Main round Group IV
2	Brazil	3	2	0	1	106	62	+44	4	Main round Group IV
3	Ukraine	3	1	0	2	77	91	−14	2	Main round Group IV
4	Kazakhstan	3	0	0	3	56	117	−61	0	President's Cup Group II

Source: Rankings
Rules for classification: 1) points; 2) head-to-head points; 3) head-to-head goal difference; 4) head-to-head number of goals scored; 5) goal difference.

29 November 2023; 18:00	Brazil	35–20	Ukraine	Arena Nord, Frederikshavn; Attendance: 1,192; Referees: Lee, Koo (KOR)
29 November 2023; 18:00	Costa, De Paula 7	(17–10)	Poliak, Smbatian 4	Arena Nord, Frederikshavn; Attendance: 1,192; Referees: Lee, Koo (KOR)
29 November 2023; 18:00	3× (suspension)	Report	3× (suspension)	Arena Nord, Frederikshavn; Attendance: 1,192; Referees: Lee, Koo (KOR)

29 November 2023; 20:30	Spain	34–17	Kazakhstan	Arena Nord, Frederikshavn; Attendance: 575; Referees: Al-Enezi, Al-Naseem (KUW)
29 November 2023; 20:30	three players 5	(14–8)	Radayeva 5	Arena Nord, Frederikshavn; Attendance: 575; Referees: Al-Enezi, Al-Naseem (KUW)
29 November 2023; 20:30	1× (yellow card) 2× (suspension)	Report	2× (suspension)	Arena Nord, Frederikshavn; Attendance: 575; Referees: Al-Enezi, Al-Naseem (KUW)

1 December 2023; 18:00	Kazakhstan	15–46	Brazil	Arena Nord, Frederikshavn; Attendance: 473; Referees: Bolic, Hurich (AUT)
1 December 2023; 18:00	Radayeva 4	(5–25)	Cardoso de Castro 8	Arena Nord, Frederikshavn; Attendance: 473; Referees: Bolic, Hurich (AUT)
1 December 2023; 18:00	1× (suspension)	Report	1× (suspension)	Arena Nord, Frederikshavn; Attendance: 473; Referees: Bolic, Hurich (AUT)

1 December 2023; 20:30	Spain	32–20	Ukraine	Arena Nord, Frederikshavn; Attendance: 153; Referees: Belkhiri, Hamidi (ALG)
1 December 2023; 20:30	González 6	(16–12)	Smbatian 7	Arena Nord, Frederikshavn; Attendance: 153; Referees: Belkhiri, Hamidi (ALG)
1 December 2023; 20:30	2× (yellow card) 3× (suspension)	Report	3× (suspension)	Arena Nord, Frederikshavn; Attendance: 153; Referees: Belkhiri, Hamidi (ALG)

3 December 2023; 15:30	Ukraine	37–24	Kazakhstan	Arena Nord, Frederikshavn; Attendance: 1,067; Referees: Cheng, Zhou (CHN)
3 December 2023; 15:30	Andriychuk, Shukal 8	(19–12)	Khardina 6	Arena Nord, Frederikshavn; Attendance: 1,067; Referees: Cheng, Zhou (CHN)
3 December 2023; 15:30	3× (suspension)	Report	5× (suspension)	Arena Nord, Frederikshavn; Attendance: 1,067; Referees: Cheng, Zhou (CHN)

3 December 2023; 18:00	Brazil	25–27	Spain	Arena Nord, Frederikshavn; Attendance: 811; Referees: Carmaux, Mursch (FRA)
3 December 2023; 18:00	Belo 8	(12–16)	Arcos 5	Arena Nord, Frederikshavn; Attendance: 811; Referees: Carmaux, Mursch (FRA)
3 December 2023; 18:00	6× (suspension)	Report	1× (yellow card) 5× (suspension)	Arena Nord, Frederikshavn; Attendance: 811; Referees: Carmaux, Mursch (FRA)

=== Group H ===
Pos	Team	Pld	W	D	L	GF	GA	GD	Pts	Qualification
1	Netherlands	3	3	0	0	114	66	+48	6	Main round Group IV
2	Czech Republic	3	2	0	1	83	77	+6	4	Main round Group IV
3	Argentina	3	1	0	2	79	98	−19	2	Main round Group IV
4	Congo	3	0	0	3	68	103	−35	0	President's Cup Group II

Source: Rankings
Rules for classification: 1) points; 2) head-to-head points; 3) head-to-head goal difference; 4) head-to-head number of goals scored; 5) goal difference.

30 November 2023; 18:00	Netherlands	41–26	Argentina	Arena Nord, Frederikshavn; Attendance: 576; Referees: Kažanegra, Vujačić (MNE)
30 November 2023; 18:00	Polman 7	(20–14)	Pizzo 5	Arena Nord, Frederikshavn; Attendance: 576; Referees: Kažanegra, Vujačić (MNE)
30 November 2023; 18:00	5× (suspension)	Report	1× (suspension)	Arena Nord, Frederikshavn; Attendance: 576; Referees: Kažanegra, Vujačić (MNE)

30 November 2023; 20:30	Czech Republic	32–22	Congo	Arena Nord, Frederikshavn; Attendance: 389; Referees: Bolic, Hurich (AUT)
30 November 2023; 20:30	Cholevová 11	(19–11)	Ngombele 9	Arena Nord, Frederikshavn; Attendance: 389; Referees: Bolic, Hurich (AUT)
30 November 2023; 20:30	4× (suspension)	Report	5× (suspension) 1× (red card)	Arena Nord, Frederikshavn; Attendance: 389; Referees: Bolic, Hurich (AUT)

2 December 2023; 15:30	Czech Republic	31–22	Argentina	Arena Nord, Frederikshavn; Attendance: 711; Referees: Altmár, Horváth (HUN)
2 December 2023; 15:30	Malá 8	(16–10)	Gavilan, Pizzo 5	Arena Nord, Frederikshavn; Attendance: 711; Referees: Altmár, Horváth (HUN)
2 December 2023; 15:30	1× (yellow card) 7× (suspension)	Report	1× (yellow card) 3× (suspension)	Arena Nord, Frederikshavn; Attendance: 711; Referees: Altmár, Horváth (HUN)

2 December 2023; 18:00	Congo	20–40	Netherlands	Arena Nord, Frederikshavn; Attendance: 527; Referees: Al-Enezi, Al-Naseem (KUW)
2 December 2023; 18:00	Diagouraga 7	(9–20)	Van Wetering 8	Arena Nord, Frederikshavn; Attendance: 527; Referees: Al-Enezi, Al-Naseem (KUW)
2 December 2023; 18:00	1× (yellow card) 6× (suspension) 1× (red card)	Report	1× (suspension)	Arena Nord, Frederikshavn; Attendance: 527; Referees: Al-Enezi, Al-Naseem (KUW)

4 December 2023; 18:00	Argentina	31–26	Congo	Arena Nord, Frederikshavn; Attendance: 507; Referees: Mitrović, Vešović (MNE)
4 December 2023; 18:00	Casasola 7	(14–15)	Diagouraga 8	Arena Nord, Frederikshavn; Attendance: 507; Referees: Mitrović, Vešović (MNE)
4 December 2023; 18:00	3× (suspension)	Report	1× (yellow card) 7× (suspension)	Arena Nord, Frederikshavn; Attendance: 507; Referees: Mitrović, Vešović (MNE)

4 December 2023; 20:30	Netherlands	33–20	Czech Republic	Arena Nord, Frederikshavn; Attendance: 674; Referees: Belkhiri, Hamidi (ALG)
4 December 2023; 20:30	Van Wetering 7	(14–8)	Cholevová 6	Arena Nord, Frederikshavn; Attendance: 674; Referees: Belkhiri, Hamidi (ALG)
4 December 2023; 20:30	5× (suspension)	Report	2× (suspension)	Arena Nord, Frederikshavn; Attendance: 674; Referees: Belkhiri, Hamidi (ALG)

== President's Cup ==
=== Group I ===
Pos	Team	Pld	W	D	L	GF	GA	GD	Pts	Qualification
1	Iceland	3	3	0	0	92	56	+36	6	25th place game
2	China	3	2	0	1	78	74	+4	4	27th place game
3	Paraguay	3	1	0	2	60	67	−7	2	29th place game
4	Greenland	3	0	0	3	57	90	−33	0	31st place game

Source: Rankings
Rules for classification: 1) points; 2) head-to-head points; 3) head-to-head goal difference; 4) head-to-head number of goals scored; 5) goal difference.

7 December 2023; 15:30	China	23–20	Paraguay	Arena Nord, Frederikshavn; Attendance: 254; Referees: Altmár, Horváth (HUN)
7 December 2023; 15:30	Jin 6	(9–10)	Fernández, Insfrán 6	Arena Nord, Frederikshavn; Attendance: 254; Referees: Altmár, Horváth (HUN)
7 December 2023; 15:30	6× (suspension) 1× (red card)	Report	1× (suspension)	Arena Nord, Frederikshavn; Attendance: 254; Referees: Altmár, Horváth (HUN)

7 December 2023; 18:00	Greenland	14–37	Iceland	Arena Nord, Frederikshavn; Attendance: 702; Referees: Doychinov, Goretsov (BUL)
7 December 2023; 18:00	Holm 4	(8–19)	Ásgeirsdóttir 10	Arena Nord, Frederikshavn; Attendance: 702; Referees: Doychinov, Goretsov (BUL)
7 December 2023; 18:00	4× (suspension)	Report	1× (yellow card) 2× (suspension)	Arena Nord, Frederikshavn; Attendance: 702; Referees: Doychinov, Goretsov (BUL)

9 December 2023; 18:00	Paraguay	19–25	Iceland	Arena Nord, Frederikshavn; Attendance: 153; Referees: Lovin, Stancu (ROU)
9 December 2023; 18:00	Insfrán 7	(9–13)	Albertsdóttir 7	Arena Nord, Frederikshavn; Attendance: 153; Referees: Lovin, Stancu (ROU)
9 December 2023; 18:00	1× (yellow card) 5× (suspension)	Report	1× (yellow card) 5× (suspension) 1× (red card)	Arena Nord, Frederikshavn; Attendance: 153; Referees: Lovin, Stancu (ROU)

9 December 2023; 20:30	China	32–24	Greenland	Arena Nord, Frederikshavn; Attendance: 455; Referees: H. El-Saied, Y. El-Saied (EGY)
9 December 2023; 20:30	Liu C. 7	(17–8)	Holm, Petersen 4	Arena Nord, Frederikshavn; Attendance: 455; Referees: H. El-Saied, Y. El-Saied (EGY)
9 December 2023; 20:30	3× (suspension)	Report	4× (suspension)	Arena Nord, Frederikshavn; Attendance: 455; Referees: H. El-Saied, Y. El-Saied (EGY)

11 December 2023; 18:00	Iceland	30–23	China	Arena Nord, Frederikshavn; Attendance: 134; Referees: Budzák, Záhradník (SVK)
11 December 2023; 18:00	Erlingsdóttir, Magnúsdóttir 6	(13–11)	Jin 7	Arena Nord, Frederikshavn; Attendance: 134; Referees: Budzák, Záhradník (SVK)
11 December 2023; 18:00	2× (yellow card) 2× (suspension)	Report	1× (yellow card) 2× (suspension) 1× (red card)	Arena Nord, Frederikshavn; Attendance: 134; Referees: Budzák, Záhradník (SVK)

11 December 2023; 20:30	Paraguay	21–19	Greenland	Arena Nord, Frederikshavn; Attendance: 332; Referees: Al-Enezi, Al-Naseem (KUW)
11 December 2023; 20:30	Mendoza 6	(11–9)	Bjerge 4	Arena Nord, Frederikshavn; Attendance: 332; Referees: Al-Enezi, Al-Naseem (KUW)
11 December 2023; 20:30	1× (yellow card)	Report	4× (suspension)	Arena Nord, Frederikshavn; Attendance: 332; Referees: Al-Enezi, Al-Naseem (KUW)

=== Group II ===
Pos	Team	Pld	W	D	L	GF	GA	GD	Pts	Qualification
1	Congo	3	3	0	0	93	77	+16	6	25th place game
2	Chile	3	2	0	1	78	67	+11	4	27th place game
3	Kazakhstan	3	1	0	2	92	93	−1	2	29th place game
4	Iran	3	0	0	3	69	95	−26	0	31st place game

Source: Rankings
Rules for classification: 1) points; 2) head-to-head points; 3) head-to-head goal difference; 4) head-to-head number of goals scored; 5) goal difference.

6 December 2023; 13:00	Kazakhstan	36–37	Congo	Arena Nord, Frederikshavn; Attendance: 633; Referees: Cheng, Zhou (CHN)
6 December 2023; 13:00	Radayeva, Rejemetova 9	(18–15)	Diagouraga 8	Arena Nord, Frederikshavn; Attendance: 633; Referees: Cheng, Zhou (CHN)
6 December 2023; 13:00		Report	4× (suspension)	Arena Nord, Frederikshavn; Attendance: 633; Referees: Cheng, Zhou (CHN)

7 December 2023; 13:00	Chile	30–20	Iran	Arena Nord, Frederikshavn; Attendance: 220; Referees: Cheng, Zhou (CHN)
7 December 2023; 13:00	Lovera 6	(14–6)	Merikh 8	Arena Nord, Frederikshavn; Attendance: 220; Referees: Cheng, Zhou (CHN)
7 December 2023; 13:00	1× (yellow card) 2× (suspension)	Report	2× (suspension)	Arena Nord, Frederikshavn; Attendance: 220; Referees: Cheng, Zhou (CHN)

9 December 2023; 13:00	Chile	27–23	Kazakhstan	Arena Nord, Frederikshavn; Attendance: 402; Referees: Kažanegra, Vujačić (MNE)
9 December 2023; 13:00	Lovera 9	(13–11)	Rejemetova 5	Arena Nord, Frederikshavn; Attendance: 402; Referees: Kažanegra, Vujačić (MNE)
9 December 2023; 13:00	6× (suspension)	Report	1× (suspension)	Arena Nord, Frederikshavn; Attendance: 402; Referees: Kažanegra, Vujačić (MNE)

9 December 2023; 15:30	Iran	20–32	Congo	Arena Nord, Frederikshavn; Attendance: 174; Referees: Altmár, Horváth (HUN)
9 December 2023; 15:30	Badvi 6	(9–19)	Domingos 6	Arena Nord, Frederikshavn; Attendance: 174; Referees: Altmár, Horváth (HUN)
9 December 2023; 15:30	1× (yellow card) 2× (suspension)	Report	4× (suspension)	Arena Nord, Frederikshavn; Attendance: 174; Referees: Altmár, Horváth (HUN)

11 December 2023; 13:00	Congo	24–21	Chile	Arena Nord, Frederikshavn; Attendance: 154; Referees: Bolic, Hurich (AUT)
11 December 2023; 13:00	Diagouraga 5	(8–12)	Lovera 8	Arena Nord, Frederikshavn; Attendance: 154; Referees: Bolic, Hurich (AUT)
11 December 2023; 13:00	1× (yellow card) 7× (suspension)	Report	1× (yellow card) 4× (suspension)	Arena Nord, Frederikshavn; Attendance: 154; Referees: Bolic, Hurich (AUT)

11 December 2023; 15:30	Iran	29–33	Kazakhstan	Arena Nord, Frederikshavn; Attendance: 67; Referees: Doychinov, Goretsov (BUL)
11 December 2023; 15:30	Merikh 11	(15–17)	Khardina 7	Arena Nord, Frederikshavn; Attendance: 67; Referees: Doychinov, Goretsov (BUL)
11 December 2023; 15:30	1× (yellow card) 4× (suspension)	Report	1× (yellow card) 2× (suspension)	Arena Nord, Frederikshavn; Attendance: 67; Referees: Doychinov, Goretsov (BUL)

=== 31st place game ===
13 December 2023; 13:00	Greenland	23–28	Iran	Arena Nord, Frederikshavn; Attendance: 537; Referees: Altmár, Horváth (HUN)
13 December 2023; 13:00	Bjerge 8	(12–12)	Merikh 6	Arena Nord, Frederikshavn; Attendance: 537; Referees: Altmár, Horváth (HUN)
13 December 2023; 13:00	5× (suspension)	Report	5× (suspension)	Arena Nord, Frederikshavn; Attendance: 537; Referees: Altmár, Horváth (HUN)

=== 29th place game ===
13 December 2023; 15:30	Paraguay	36–30	Kazakhstan	Arena Nord, Frederikshavn; Attendance: 96; Referees: Al-Enezi, Al-Naseem (KUW)
13 December 2023; 15:30	Portillo 9	(20–18)	Khardina 9	Arena Nord, Frederikshavn; Attendance: 96; Referees: Al-Enezi, Al-Naseem (KUW)
13 December 2023; 15:30	3× (suspension)	Report	3× (suspension)	Arena Nord, Frederikshavn; Attendance: 96; Referees: Al-Enezi, Al-Naseem (KUW)

=== 27th place game ===
13 December 2023; 18:00	China	25–26	Chile	Arena Nord, Frederikshavn; Attendance: 103; Referees: H. El-Saied, Y. El-Saied (EGY)
13 December 2023; 18:00	Li 8	(13–15)	Lovera 5	Arena Nord, Frederikshavn; Attendance: 103; Referees: H. El-Saied, Y. El-Saied (EGY)
13 December 2023; 18:00	1× (yellow card) 8× (suspension) 1× (red card)	Report	4× (suspension)	Arena Nord, Frederikshavn; Attendance: 103; Referees: H. El-Saied, Y. El-Saied (EGY)

=== 25th place game ===
13 December 2023; 20:30	Iceland	30–28	Congo	Arena Nord, Frederikshavn; Attendance: 86; Referees: Kažanegra, Vujačić (MNE)
13 December 2023; 20:30	Sturludóttir 6	(14–14)	Ngombele 10	Arena Nord, Frederikshavn; Attendance: 86; Referees: Kažanegra, Vujačić (MNE)
13 December 2023; 20:30	3× (suspension)	Report	1× (yellow card) 5× (suspension)	Arena Nord, Frederikshavn; Attendance: 86; Referees: Kažanegra, Vujačić (MNE)

== Main round ==
All points and goals obtained in the preliminary round against teams that advance as well, are carried over.

=== Group I ===
Pos	Team	Pld	W	D	L	GF	GA	GD	Pts	Qualification
1	Sweden (H)	5	5	0	0	143	95	+48	10	Quarterfinals
2	Montenegro	5	3	0	2	128	108	+20	6 (Note: Montenegro 24–18 Hungary)	Quarterfinals
3	Hungary	5	3	0	2	132	112	+20	6	
4	Croatia	5	2	1	2	111	107	+4	5	
5	Senegal	5	1	1	3	103	127	−24	3	
6	Cameroon	5	0	0	5	79	147	−68	0	

Source: Rankings
Rules for classification: 1) points; 2) head-to-head points; 3) head-to-head goal difference; 4) head-to-head number of goals scored; 5) goal difference.
(H) Hosts
Notes:

7 December 2023; 15:30	Montenegro	25–26	Croatia	Scandinavium, Gothenburg; Attendance: 1,089; Referees: Álvarez, Bustamante (ESP)
7 December 2023; 15:30	Grbić 5	(13–13)	Blažević 6	Scandinavium, Gothenburg; Attendance: 1,089; Referees: Álvarez, Bustamante (ESP)
7 December 2023; 15:30	2× (yellow card) 4× (suspension) 1× (red card)	Report	1× (yellow card) 4× (suspension)	Scandinavium, Gothenburg; Attendance: 1,089; Referees: Álvarez, Bustamante (ESP)

7 December 2023; 18:00	Senegal	20–30	Hungary	Scandinavium, Gothenburg; Attendance: 2,693; Referees: Koo, Lee (KOR)
7 December 2023; 18:00	Sagna 8	(8–14)	Klujber 9	Scandinavium, Gothenburg; Attendance: 2,693; Referees: Koo, Lee (KOR)
7 December 2023; 18:00	1× (yellow card) 3× (suspension)	Report	1× (yellow card) 4× (suspension)	Scandinavium, Gothenburg; Attendance: 2,693; Referees: Koo, Lee (KOR)

7 December 2023; 20:30	Sweden	37–13	Cameroon	Scandinavium, Gothenburg; Attendance: 5,187; Referees: B. Correa, R. Correa (BRA)
7 December 2023; 20:30	Hagman 8	(16–5)	Ateba 5	Scandinavium, Gothenburg; Attendance: 5,187; Referees: B. Correa, R. Correa (BRA)
7 December 2023; 20:30		Report	1× (suspension) 2× (red card)	Scandinavium, Gothenburg; Attendance: 5,187; Referees: B. Correa, R. Correa (BRA)

9 December 2023; 15:30	Senegal	21–29	Montenegro	Scandinavium, Gothenburg; Attendance: 2,997; Referees: Budzák, Záhradník (SVK)
9 December 2023; 15:30	Sagna 4	(8–18)	four players 4	Scandinavium, Gothenburg; Attendance: 2,997; Referees: Budzák, Záhradník (SVK)
9 December 2023; 15:30	1× (yellow card) 1× (suspension) 1× (red card)	Report	1× (yellow card) 4× (suspension)	Scandinavium, Gothenburg; Attendance: 2,997; Referees: Budzák, Záhradník (SVK)

9 December 2023; 18:00	Croatia	24–15	Cameroon	Scandinavium, Gothenburg; Attendance: 6,165; Referees: Koo, Lee (KOR)
9 December 2023; 18:00	three players 3	(18–6)	Ateba 7	Scandinavium, Gothenburg; Attendance: 6,165; Referees: Koo, Lee (KOR)
9 December 2023; 18:00	2× (suspension)	Report	3× (suspension)	Scandinavium, Gothenburg; Attendance: 6,165; Referees: Koo, Lee (KOR)

9 December 2023; 20:30	Hungary	22–26	Sweden	Scandinavium, Gothenburg; Attendance: 10,561; Referees: A. Covalciuc, I. Covalciuc (MDA)
9 December 2023; 20:30	Vámos 6	(11–10)	Lindqvist, Roberts 7	Scandinavium, Gothenburg; Attendance: 10,561; Referees: A. Covalciuc, I. Covalciuc (MDA)
9 December 2023; 20:30	3× (suspension)	Report	4× (suspension)	Scandinavium, Gothenburg; Attendance: 10,561; Referees: A. Covalciuc, I. Covalciuc (MDA)

11 December 2023; 15:30	Cameroon	20–22	Senegal	Scandinavium, Gothenburg; Attendance: 626; Referees: B. Correa, R. Correa (BRA)
11 December 2023; 15:30	Ateba, Ebanga Baboga 5	(12–7)	Sagna 6	Scandinavium, Gothenburg; Attendance: 626; Referees: B. Correa, R. Correa (BRA)
11 December 2023; 15:30	1× (yellow card) 4× (suspension)	Report	1× (yellow card) 2× (suspension)	Scandinavium, Gothenburg; Attendance: 626; Referees: B. Correa, R. Correa (BRA)

11 December 2023; 18:00	Hungary	23–22	Croatia	Scandinavium, Gothenburg; Attendance: 3,449; Referees: García, Paolantoni (ARG)
11 December 2023; 18:00	Klujber 9	(8–11)	Milosavljević 8	Scandinavium, Gothenburg; Attendance: 3,449; Referees: García, Paolantoni (ARG)
11 December 2023; 18:00	3× (yellow card) 4× (suspension)	Report	2× (yellow card) 3× (suspension)	Scandinavium, Gothenburg; Attendance: 3,449; Referees: García, Paolantoni (ARG)

11 December 2023; 20:30	Montenegro	25–32	Sweden	Scandinavium, Gothenburg; Attendance: 6,589; Referees: Carmaux, Mursch (FRA)
11 December 2023; 20:30	Despotović 6	(9–15)	Hagman, Roberts 6	Scandinavium, Gothenburg; Attendance: 6,589; Referees: Carmaux, Mursch (FRA)
11 December 2023; 20:30	2× (yellow card) 6× (suspension)	Report	4× (suspension)	Scandinavium, Gothenburg; Attendance: 6,589; Referees: Carmaux, Mursch (FRA)

=== Group II ===
Pos	Team	Pld	W	D	L	GF	GA	GD	Pts	Qualification
1	France	5	5	0	0	158	128	+30	10	Quarterfinals
2	Norway (H)	5	4	0	1	172	115	+57	8	Quarterfinals
3	Slovenia	5	3	0	2	141	143	−2	6	
4	Angola	5	2	0	3	135	153	−18	4	
5	Austria	5	1	0	4	137	177	−40	2	
6	South Korea	5	0	0	5	132	159	−27	0	

Source: Rankings
Rules for classification: 1) points; 2) head-to-head points; 3) head-to-head goal difference; 4) head-to-head number of goals scored; 5) goal difference.
(H) Hosts

6 December 2023; 15:30	South Korea	27–31	Slovenia	Trondheim Spektrum, Trondheim; Attendance: 619; Referees: Lemes, Sosa (URU)
6 December 2023; 15:30	Ryu 12	(14–19)	Mavsar 9	Trondheim Spektrum, Trondheim; Attendance: 619; Referees: Lemes, Sosa (URU)
6 December 2023; 15:30	2× (suspension) 1× (red card)	Report	4× (suspension)	Trondheim Spektrum, Trondheim; Attendance: 619; Referees: Lemes, Sosa (URU)

6 December 2023; 18:00	France	41–27	Austria	Trondheim Spektrum, Trondheim; Attendance: 3,198; Referees: H. El-Saied, Y. El-Saied (EGY)
6 December 2023; 18:00	Bouktit 7	(25–14)	I. Ivančok 8	Trondheim Spektrum, Trondheim; Attendance: 3,198; Referees: H. El-Saied, Y. El-Saied (EGY)
6 December 2023; 18:00	1× (yellow card) 4× (suspension)	Report	2× (yellow card) 5× (suspension)	Trondheim Spektrum, Trondheim; Attendance: 3,198; Referees: H. El-Saied, Y. El-Saied (EGY)

6 December 2023; 20:30	Norway	37–19	Angola	Trondheim Spektrum, Trondheim; Attendance: 6,806; Referees: Jovandić, Sekulić (SRB)
6 December 2023; 20:30	Herrem 7	(20–9)	four players 3	Trondheim Spektrum, Trondheim; Attendance: 6,806; Referees: Jovandić, Sekulić (SRB)
6 December 2023; 20:30	1× (suspension)	Report	3× (suspension)	Trondheim Spektrum, Trondheim; Attendance: 6,806; Referees: Jovandić, Sekulić (SRB)

8 December 2023; 15:30	Austria	25–30	Angola	Trondheim Spektrum, Trondheim; Attendance: 1,236; Referees: A. Konjičanin, D. Konjičanin (BIH)
8 December 2023; 15:30	K. Pandza 8	(14–16)	Carlos 9	Trondheim Spektrum, Trondheim; Attendance: 1,236; Referees: A. Konjičanin, D. Konjičanin (BIH)
8 December 2023; 15:30	1× (yellow card) 3× (suspension)	Report	4× (suspension) 1× (red card)	Trondheim Spektrum, Trondheim; Attendance: 1,236; Referees: A. Konjičanin, D. Konjičanin (BIH)

8 December 2023; 18:00	South Korea	22–32	France	Trondheim Spektrum, Trondheim; Attendance: 3,507; Referees: Mitrović, Vešović (MNE)
8 December 2023; 18:00	Gim 5	(12–17)	Kanor 7	Trondheim Spektrum, Trondheim; Attendance: 3,507; Referees: Mitrović, Vešović (MNE)
8 December 2023; 18:00	1× (yellow card) 5× (suspension)	Report	1× (yellow card) 1× (red card)	Trondheim Spektrum, Trondheim; Attendance: 3,507; Referees: Mitrović, Vešović (MNE)

8 December 2023; 20:30	Slovenia	21–34	Norway	Trondheim Spektrum, Trondheim; Attendance: 5,544; Referees: Kuttler, Merz (GER)
8 December 2023; 20:30	Varagić 5	(12–17)	Herrem 6	Trondheim Spektrum, Trondheim; Attendance: 5,544; Referees: Kuttler, Merz (GER)
8 December 2023; 20:30	1× (yellow card) 3× (suspension)	Report	1× (yellow card) 2× (suspension)	Trondheim Spektrum, Trondheim; Attendance: 5,544; Referees: Kuttler, Merz (GER)

10 December 2023; 15:30	Angola	33–31	South Korea	Trondheim Spektrum, Trondheim; Attendance: 1,716; Referees: Jovandić, Sekulić (SRB)
10 December 2023; 15:30	Kassoma 11	(20–15)	Woo 9	Trondheim Spektrum, Trondheim; Attendance: 1,716; Referees: Jovandić, Sekulić (SRB)
10 December 2023; 15:30	1× (yellow card) 2× (suspension)	Report	1× (suspension)	Trondheim Spektrum, Trondheim; Attendance: 1,716; Referees: Jovandić, Sekulić (SRB)

10 December 2023; 18:00	Slovenia	32–27	Austria	Trondheim Spektrum, Trondheim; Attendance: 4,060; Referees: Lemes, Sosa (URU)
10 December 2023; 18:00	Mavsar 11	(19–14)	K. Pandza 7	Trondheim Spektrum, Trondheim; Attendance: 4,060; Referees: Lemes, Sosa (URU)
10 December 2023; 18:00	1× (yellow card) 2× (suspension)	Report		Trondheim Spektrum, Trondheim; Attendance: 4,060; Referees: Lemes, Sosa (URU)

10 December 2023; 20:30	France	24–23	Norway	Trondheim Spektrum, Trondheim; Attendance: 6,754; Referees: A. Konjičanin, D. Konjičanin (BIH)
10 December 2023; 20:30	Nze Minko 6	(12–12)	Ingstad, Mørk 4	Trondheim Spektrum, Trondheim; Attendance: 6,754; Referees: A. Konjičanin, D. Konjičanin (BIH)
10 December 2023; 20:30	6× (suspension) 1× (red card)	Report	4× (suspension)	Trondheim Spektrum, Trondheim; Attendance: 6,754; Referees: A. Konjičanin, D. Konjičanin (BIH)

=== Group III ===
Pos	Team	Pld	W	D	L	GF	GA	GD	Pts	Qualification
1	Denmark (H)	5	4	0	1	152	121	+31	8 (Note: Germany 28–30 Denmark)	Quarterfinals
2	Germany	5	4	0	1	147	120	+27	8	Quarterfinals
3	Romania	5	3	0	2	141	145	−4	6	
4	Poland	5	2	0	3	119	143	−24	4 (Note: Poland 32–30 Japan)	
5	Japan	5	2	0	3	137	141	−4	4	
6	Serbia	5	0	0	5	111	137	−26	0	

Source: Rankings
Rules for classification: 1) points; 2) head-to-head points; 3) head-to-head goal difference; 4) head-to-head number of goals scored; 5) goal difference.
(H) Hosts
Notes:

7 December 2023; 15:30	Serbia	21–22	Poland	Jyske Bank Boxen, Herning; Attendance: 511; Referees: Belkhiri, Hamidi (ALG)
7 December 2023; 15:30	Radosavljević 6	(13–10)	Kochaniak 6	Jyske Bank Boxen, Herning; Attendance: 511; Referees: Belkhiri, Hamidi (ALG)
7 December 2023; 15:30	2× (yellow card) 5× (suspension)	Report	3× (suspension)	Jyske Bank Boxen, Herning; Attendance: 511; Referees: Belkhiri, Hamidi (ALG)

7 December 2023; 18:00	Germany	24–22	Romania	Jyske Bank Boxen, Herning; Attendance: 4,526; Referees: Lah, Sok (SLO)
7 December 2023; 18:00	Döll, Lott 4	(9–12)	Buceschi 8	Jyske Bank Boxen, Herning; Attendance: 4,526; Referees: Lah, Sok (SLO)
7 December 2023; 18:00	1× (yellow card) 4× (suspension)	Report	1× (yellow card) 3× (suspension) 1× (red card)	Jyske Bank Boxen, Herning; Attendance: 4,526; Referees: Lah, Sok (SLO)

7 December 2023; 20:30	Denmark	26–27	Japan	Jyske Bank Boxen, Herning; Attendance: 6,707; Referees: Carmaux, Mursch (FRA)
7 December 2023; 20:30	Højlund 5	(12–12)	Hattori 7	Jyske Bank Boxen, Herning; Attendance: 6,707; Referees: Carmaux, Mursch (FRA)
7 December 2023; 20:30	1× (yellow card) 5× (suspension)	Report	2× (suspension)	Jyske Bank Boxen, Herning; Attendance: 6,707; Referees: Carmaux, Mursch (FRA)

9 December 2023; 15:30	Romania	32–28	Japan	Jyske Bank Boxen, Herning; Attendance: 3,502; Referees: García, Paolantoni (ARG)
9 December 2023; 15:30	Buceschi 12	(17–14)	Aizawa, Hattori 5	Jyske Bank Boxen, Herning; Attendance: 3,502; Referees: García, Paolantoni (ARG)
9 December 2023; 15:30	1× (yellow card) 4× (suspension)	Report	4× (suspension)	Jyske Bank Boxen, Herning; Attendance: 3,502; Referees: García, Paolantoni (ARG)

9 December 2023; 18:00	Serbia	21–31	Germany	Jyske Bank Boxen, Herning; Attendance: 8,138; Referees: Álvarez, Bustamante (ESP)
9 December 2023; 18:00	Jovović 6	(13–14)	Döll 5	Jyske Bank Boxen, Herning; Attendance: 8,138; Referees: Álvarez, Bustamante (ESP)
9 December 2023; 18:00	4× (suspension)	Report	3× (suspension)	Jyske Bank Boxen, Herning; Attendance: 8,138; Referees: Álvarez, Bustamante (ESP)

9 December 2023; 20:30	Poland	22–32	Denmark	Jyske Bank Boxen, Herning; Attendance: 10,398; Referees: Bolic, Hurich (AUT)
9 December 2023; 20:30	Rosiak 6	(12–15)	Jørgensen, Østergaard 5	Jyske Bank Boxen, Herning; Attendance: 10,398; Referees: Bolic, Hurich (AUT)
9 December 2023; 20:30	8× (suspension)	Report	3× (suspension)	Jyske Bank Boxen, Herning; Attendance: 10,398; Referees: Bolic, Hurich (AUT)

11 December 2023; 15:30	Japan	22–20	Serbia	Jyske Bank Boxen, Herning; Attendance: 1,979; Referees: A. Covalciuc, I. Covalciuc (MDA)
11 December 2023; 15:30	Nakayama 6	(9–8)	Vukajlović 6	Jyske Bank Boxen, Herning; Attendance: 1,979; Referees: A. Covalciuc, I. Covalciuc (MDA)
11 December 2023; 15:30	3× (suspension)	Report	1× (yellow card) 3× (suspension) 1× (red card)	Jyske Bank Boxen, Herning; Attendance: 1,979; Referees: A. Covalciuc, I. Covalciuc (MDA)

11 December 2023; 18:00	Poland	26–27	Romania	Jyske Bank Boxen, Herning; Attendance: 5,221; Referees: Belkhiri, Hamidi (ALG)
11 December 2023; 18:00	Balsam 8	(10–13)	Buceschi 11	Jyske Bank Boxen, Herning; Attendance: 5,221; Referees: Belkhiri, Hamidi (ALG)
11 December 2023; 18:00	1× (yellow card) 3× (suspension)	Report	1× (yellow card) 4× (suspension)	Jyske Bank Boxen, Herning; Attendance: 5,221; Referees: Belkhiri, Hamidi (ALG)

11 December 2023; 20:30	Germany	28–30	Denmark	Jyske Bank Boxen, Herning; Attendance: 8,514; Referees: Lah, Sok (SLO)
11 December 2023; 20:30	Bölk 5	(13–15)	Friis 7	Jyske Bank Boxen, Herning; Attendance: 8,514; Referees: Lah, Sok (SLO)
11 December 2023; 20:30	1× (yellow card) 6× (suspension) 1× (red card)	Report	1× (yellow card) 3× (suspension)	Jyske Bank Boxen, Herning; Attendance: 8,514; Referees: Lah, Sok (SLO)

=== Group IV ===
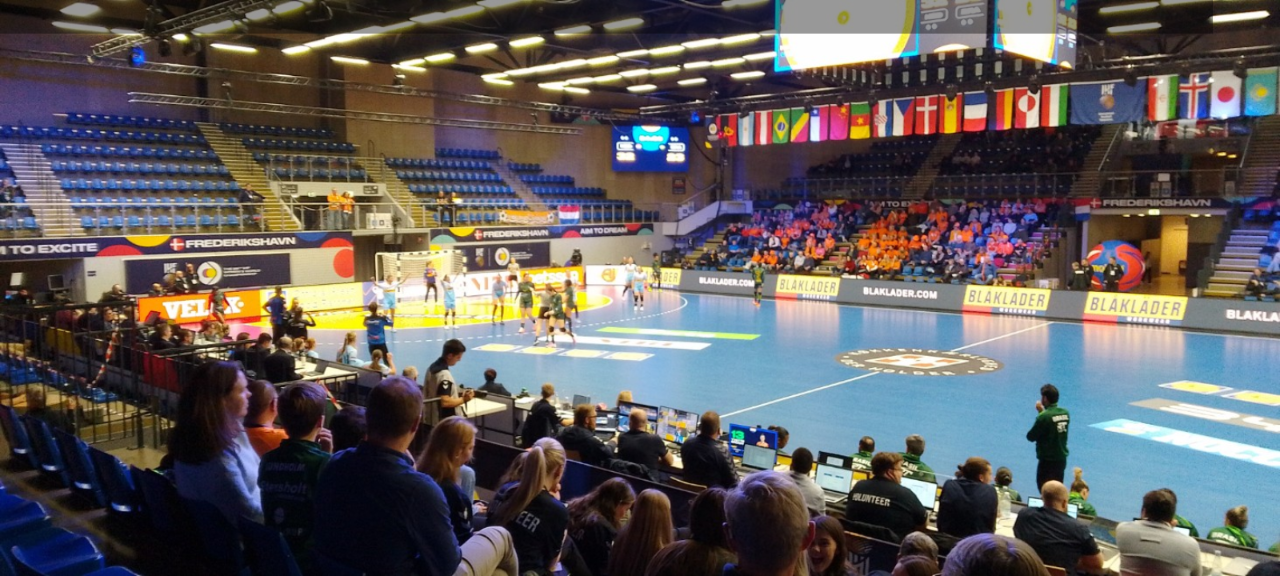
Netherlands vs Brazil on 6 December 2023

Pos	Team	Pld	W	D	L	GF	GA	GD	Pts	Qualification
1	Netherlands	5	5	0	0	178	115	+63	10	Quarterfinals
2	Czech Republic	5	3	0	2	138	130	+8	6 (Note: Czech Republic 2 Pts, +5 GD; Brazil 2 Pts, +1 GD; Spain 2 Pts, −6 GD.)	Quarterfinals
3	Brazil	5	3	0	2	150	128	+22	6	
4	Spain	5	3	0	2	132	127	+5	6	
5	Argentina	5	1	0	4	115	155	−40	2	
6	Ukraine	5	0	0	5	104	162	−58	0	

Source: Rankings
Rules for classification: 1) points; 2) head-to-head points; 3) head-to-head goal difference; 4) head-to-head number of goals scored; 5) goal difference.
Notes:

6 December 2023; 15:30	Ukraine	23–30	Czech Republic	Arena Nord, Frederikshavn; Attendance: 711; Referees: Altmár, Horváth (HUN)
6 December 2023; 15:30	Smbatian 5	(11–15)	Jeřábková 9	Arena Nord, Frederikshavn; Attendance: 711; Referees: Altmár, Horváth (HUN)
6 December 2023; 15:30	2× (yellow card) 2× (suspension)	Report		Arena Nord, Frederikshavn; Attendance: 711; Referees: Altmár, Horváth (HUN)

6 December 2023; 18:00	Spain	30–23	Argentina	Arena Nord, Frederikshavn; Attendance: 902; Referees: Kažanegra, Vujačić (MNE)
6 December 2023; 18:00	Etxeberria 7	(12–13)	Gavilan 8	Arena Nord, Frederikshavn; Attendance: 902; Referees: Kažanegra, Vujačić (MNE)
6 December 2023; 18:00	2× (suspension)	Report	1× (suspension) 1× (red card)	Arena Nord, Frederikshavn; Attendance: 902; Referees: Kažanegra, Vujačić (MNE)

6 December 2023; 20:30	Netherlands	35–27	Brazil	Arena Nord, Frederikshavn; Attendance: 855; Referees: Lovin, Stancu (ROU)
6 December 2023; 20:30	Housheer 6	(18–13)	De Abreu Rosa 7	Arena Nord, Frederikshavn; Attendance: 855; Referees: Lovin, Stancu (ROU)
6 December 2023; 20:30	3× (suspension)	Report	1× (yellow card) 3× (suspension)	Arena Nord, Frederikshavn; Attendance: 855; Referees: Lovin, Stancu (ROU)

8 December 2023; 15:30	Brazil	33–19	Argentina	Arena Nord, Frederikshavn; Attendance: 417; Referees: Doychinov, Goretsov (BUL)
8 December 2023; 15:30	Cardoso de Castro, De Paula 5	(16–7)	Pizzo 5	Arena Nord, Frederikshavn; Attendance: 417; Referees: Doychinov, Goretsov (BUL)
8 December 2023; 15:30	4× (suspension)	Report	1× (suspension)	Arena Nord, Frederikshavn; Attendance: 417; Referees: Doychinov, Goretsov (BUL)

8 December 2023; 18:00	Czech Republic	30–22	Spain	Arena Nord, Frederikshavn; Attendance: 697; Referees: Hansen, Madsen (DEN)
8 December 2023; 18:00	Jeřábková 9	(13–9)	Pérez 6	Arena Nord, Frederikshavn; Attendance: 697; Referees: Hansen, Madsen (DEN)
8 December 2023; 18:00	1× (yellow card) 2× (suspension)	Report		Arena Nord, Frederikshavn; Attendance: 697; Referees: Hansen, Madsen (DEN)

8 December 2023; 20:30	Ukraine	21–40	Netherlands	Arena Nord, Frederikshavn; Attendance: 823; Referees: Al-Enezi, Al-Naseem (KUW)
8 December 2023; 20:30	Shukal 5	(8–19)	Abbingh 8	Arena Nord, Frederikshavn; Attendance: 823; Referees: Al-Enezi, Al-Naseem (KUW)
8 December 2023; 20:30	1× (yellow card) 3× (suspension)	Report	2× (suspension)	Arena Nord, Frederikshavn; Attendance: 823; Referees: Al-Enezi, Al-Naseem (KUW)

10 December 2023; 12:00	Argentina	25–20	Ukraine	Arena Nord, Frederikshavn; Attendance: 504; Referees: Kažanegra, Vujačić (MNE)
10 December 2023; 12:00	Cavo 6	(13–11)	Konovalova 6	Arena Nord, Frederikshavn; Attendance: 504; Referees: Kažanegra, Vujačić (MNE)
10 December 2023; 12:00	6× (suspension) 1× (red card)	Report	1× (yellow card) 5× (suspension)	Arena Nord, Frederikshavn; Attendance: 504; Referees: Kažanegra, Vujačić (MNE)

10 December 2023; 14:15	Czech Republic	27–30	Brazil	Arena Nord, Frederikshavn; Attendance: 769; Referees: Lovin, Stancu (ROU)
10 December 2023; 14:15	Jeřábková 11	(17–16)	Cardoso de Castro 9	Arena Nord, Frederikshavn; Attendance: 769; Referees: Lovin, Stancu (ROU)
10 December 2023; 14:15	2× (suspension)	Report	1× (yellow card) 3× (suspension)	Arena Nord, Frederikshavn; Attendance: 769; Referees: Lovin, Stancu (ROU)

10 December 2023; 16:30	Netherlands	29–21	Spain	Arena Nord, Frederikshavn; Attendance: 1,314; Referees: Hansen, Madsen (DEN)
10 December 2023; 16:30	Sprengers 6	(13–9)	González, So Delgado 5	Arena Nord, Frederikshavn; Attendance: 1,314; Referees: Hansen, Madsen (DEN)
10 December 2023; 16:30	3× (suspension)	Report	2× (suspension)	Arena Nord, Frederikshavn; Attendance: 1,314; Referees: Hansen, Madsen (DEN)

== Final round ==
=== Bracket ===
Quarter-finals
13 December
Sweden	27
Germany	20
12 December
France	33
Czech Republic	22
13 December
Denmark	26
Montenegro	24
12 December
Netherlands	23
Norway	30

Semi-finals
15 December
Sweden	28
France	37
15 December
Denmark	28
Norway (ET)	29

Final
17 December
France	31
Norway	28
Third place
17 December
Sweden	27
Denmark	28

=== 5–8th place playoffs ===
5–8th place semifinals
15 December
Germany	32
Czech Republic	26
15 December
Montenegro	25
Netherlands	28

Fifth place
17 December
Germany	26
Netherlands	30
Seventh place
17 December
Czech Republic	24
Montenegro	28

=== Quarterfinals ===
12 December 2023; 17:30	France	33–22	Czech Republic	Trondheim Spektrum, Trondheim; Attendance: 4,455; Referees: Álvarez, Bustamante (ESP)
12 December 2023; 17:30	Nze Minko 5	(18–16)	Jeřábková 6	Trondheim Spektrum, Trondheim; Attendance: 4,455; Referees: Álvarez, Bustamante (ESP)
12 December 2023; 17:30	4× (suspension)	Report	2× (yellow card) 1× (suspension)	Trondheim Spektrum, Trondheim; Attendance: 4,455; Referees: Álvarez, Bustamante (ESP)

12 December 2023; 20:30	Netherlands	23–30	Norway	Trondheim Spektrum, Trondheim; Attendance: 7,514; Referees: Merz, Kuttler (GER)
12 December 2023; 20:30	Housheer, Malestein 4	(11–12)	Skogrand 9	Trondheim Spektrum, Trondheim; Attendance: 7,514; Referees: Merz, Kuttler (GER)
12 December 2023; 20:30	3× (suspension)	Report	1× (yellow card) 7× (suspension)	Trondheim Spektrum, Trondheim; Attendance: 7,514; Referees: Merz, Kuttler (GER)

13 December 2023; 17:30	Sweden	27–20	Germany	Jyske Bank Boxen, Herning; Attendance: 6,613; Referees: Hansen, Madsen (DEN)
13 December 2023; 17:30	four players 5	(16–6)	three players 4	Jyske Bank Boxen, Herning; Attendance: 6,613; Referees: Hansen, Madsen (DEN)
13 December 2023; 17:30	1× (yellow card)	Report		Jyske Bank Boxen, Herning; Attendance: 6,613; Referees: Hansen, Madsen (DEN)

13 December 2023; 20:30	Denmark	26–24	Montenegro	Jyske Bank Boxen, Herning; Attendance: 11,031; Referees: Belkhiri, Hamidi (ALG)
13 December 2023; 20:30	Friis, A.M. Hansen 5	(13–10)	Mugoša 6	Jyske Bank Boxen, Herning; Attendance: 11,031; Referees: Belkhiri, Hamidi (ALG)
13 December 2023; 20:30	1× (yellow card) 1× (suspension)	Report	2× (yellow card) 6× (suspension)	Jyske Bank Boxen, Herning; Attendance: 11,031; Referees: Belkhiri, Hamidi (ALG)

=== 5–8th place semifinals ===
15 December 2023; 11:30	Germany	32–26	Czech Republic	Jyske Bank Boxen, Herning; Attendance: 445; Referees: García, Paolantoni (ARG)
15 December 2023; 11:30	Leuchter 6	(14–12)	Jeřábková 6	Jyske Bank Boxen, Herning; Attendance: 445; Referees: García, Paolantoni (ARG)
15 December 2023; 11:30	3× (yellow card) 6× (suspension)	Report	3× (suspension)	Jyske Bank Boxen, Herning; Attendance: 445; Referees: García, Paolantoni (ARG)

15 December 2023; 14:30	Montenegro	25–28	Netherlands	Jyske Bank Boxen, Herning; Attendance: 1,627; Referees: Hansen, Madsen (DEN)
15 December 2023; 14:30	Mugoša 6	(13–14)	Malestein 8	Jyske Bank Boxen, Herning; Attendance: 1,627; Referees: Hansen, Madsen (DEN)
15 December 2023; 14:30	1× (suspension)	Report	1× (suspension)	Jyske Bank Boxen, Herning; Attendance: 1,627; Referees: Hansen, Madsen (DEN)

=== Semifinals ===
15 December 2023
17:30
Denmark
28–29 (ET)
Norway
Jyske Bank Boxen, Herning
Attendance: 12,136
Referees: A. Konjičanin, D. Konjičanin (BIH)
Jørgensen 7
(14–9)
Reistad 15
1× (yellow card) 5× (suspension)
Report
4× (suspension)

FT: 23–23 ET: 5–6

15 December 2023; 21:00	Sweden	28–37	France	Jyske Bank Boxen, Herning; Attendance: 8,154; Referees: Kuttler, Merz (GER)
15 December 2023; 21:00	Hagman 5	(11–19)	Horacek 9	Jyske Bank Boxen, Herning; Attendance: 8,154; Referees: Kuttler, Merz (GER)
15 December 2023; 21:00	5× (suspension)	Report	1× (yellow card) 2× (suspension)	Jyske Bank Boxen, Herning; Attendance: 8,154; Referees: Kuttler, Merz (GER)

=== Seventh place game ===
17 December 2023; 10:15	Czech Republic	24–28	Montenegro	Jyske Bank Boxen, Herning; Attendance: 491; Referees: Lovin, Stancu (ROU)
17 December 2023; 10:15	three players 5	(10–14)	Grbić 7	Jyske Bank Boxen, Herning; Attendance: 491; Referees: Lovin, Stancu (ROU)
17 December 2023; 10:15	1× (yellow card)	Report	1× (yellow card) 5× (suspension)	Jyske Bank Boxen, Herning; Attendance: 491; Referees: Lovin, Stancu (ROU)

=== Fifth place game ===
17 December 2023; 13:00	Germany	26–30	Netherlands	Jyske Bank Boxen, Herning; Attendance: 2,594; Referees: A. Covalciuc, I. Covalciuc (MDA)
17 December 2023; 13:00	Döll 7	(7–16)	Malestein 7	Jyske Bank Boxen, Herning; Attendance: 2,594; Referees: A. Covalciuc, I. Covalciuc (MDA)
17 December 2023; 13:00	5× (suspension)	Report	4× (suspension)	Jyske Bank Boxen, Herning; Attendance: 2,594; Referees: A. Covalciuc, I. Covalciuc (MDA)

=== Third place game ===
17 December 2023; 16:00	Sweden	27–28	Denmark	Jyske Bank Boxen, Herning; Attendance: 11,877; Referees: Álvarez, Bustamante (ESP)
17 December 2023; 16:00	Blohm, Mellegård 7	(15–18)	three players 5	Jyske Bank Boxen, Herning; Attendance: 11,877; Referees: Álvarez, Bustamante (ESP)
17 December 2023; 16:00	2× (suspension)	Report	2× (yellow card) 1× (suspension)	Jyske Bank Boxen, Herning; Attendance: 11,877; Referees: Álvarez, Bustamante (ESP)

=== Final ===
17 December 2023; 19:00	France	31–28	Norway	Jyske Bank Boxen, Herning; Attendance: 12,031; Referees: Lah, Sok (SLO)
17 December 2023; 19:00	Grandveau, Horacek 5	(20–17)	Mørk 8	Jyske Bank Boxen, Herning; Attendance: 12,031; Referees: Lah, Sok (SLO)
17 December 2023; 19:00	1× (yellow card) 4× (suspension)	Report	2× (yellow card) 3× (suspension)	Jyske Bank Boxen, Herning; Attendance: 12,031; Referees: Lah, Sok (SLO)

== Final ranking and awards ==
=== Final ranking ===
Places 1 to 8 and 25 to 32 will be decided by play-off or knock-out. Teams finishing third in the main round will be ranked 9th to 12th, teams finishing fourth in the main round 13th to 16th, teams finishing fifth in the main round 17th to 20th and teams ranked sixth 21st to 24th. In case of a tie in points gained, the goal difference of the main round will be taken into account, then number of goals scored. If teams will still be equal, number of points gained in the preliminary round will be considered followed by the goal difference and then number of goals scored in the preliminary round.

Rank	Team
1st place, gold medalist(s)	France
2nd place, silver medalist(s)	Norway
3rd place, bronze medalist(s)	Denmark
4	Sweden
5	Netherlands
6	Germany
7	Montenegro
8	Czech Republic
9	Brazil
10	Hungary
11	Slovenia
12	Romania
13	Spain
14	Croatia
15	Angola
16	Poland
17	Japan
18	Senegal
19	Austria
20	Argentina
21	Serbia
22	South Korea
23	Ukraine
24	Cameroon
25	Iceland
26	Congo
27	Chile
28	China
29	Paraguay
30	Kazakhstan
31	Iran
32	Greenland

Qualified for the 2024 Summer Olympics and the 2025 World Women's Handball Championship
Qualified for the 2024 Summer Olympics
Qualified for the 2024 Summer Olympics through other tournaments
Qualified for the Olympic Qualification Tournament
Qualified for the Olympic Qualification Tournament through other tournaments
Ineligible to qualify for the Olympics: Greenland do not have a National Olympic Committee recognized by the IOC

2023 Women's World Champions

France
3rd title

Team roster: Laura Glauser, Méline Nocandy, Alicia Toublanc, Chloé Valentini, Coralie Lassource, Grâce Zaadi, Océane Sercien-Ugolin, Laura Flippes, Orlane Kanor, Tamara Horacek, Déborah Lassource, Pauletta Foppa, Estelle Nze Minko, Oriane Ondono, Camille Depuiset, Lucie Granier, Sarah Bouktit, Léna Grandveau, Hatadou Sako
Head Coach: Olivier Krumbholz

=== All-star Team ===
The All-star Team was announced on 17 December 2023.

Position	Player
Goalkeeper	(France) Laura Glauser
Left wing	(France) Chloé Valentini
Left back	(France) Estelle Nze Minko
Centre back	(Norway) Stine Bredal Oftedal
Right back	(Denmark) Louise Burgaard
Right wing	(Sweden) Nathalie Hagman
Pivot	(Sweden) Linn Blohm
Best young player	(Germany) Viola Leuchter
MVP	(Norway) Henny Reistad
Top scorer	(Czech Republic) Markéta Jeřábková

== Statistics ==
=== Top goalscorers ===
Rank	Name	Goals	Shots	%
1	(Czech Republic) Markéta Jeřábková	63	110	57
2	(Norway) Henny Reistad	52	70	74
3	(Denmark) Kristina Jørgensen	47	74	64
3	(Netherlands) Angela Malestein	47	66	71
3	(Romania) Eliza Buceschi	47	63	75
6	(Czech Republic) Veronika Malá	46	64	72
7	(Sweden) Nathalie Hagman	43	57	75
7	(Montenegro) Dijana Mugoša	43	62	69
9	(Norway) Camilla Herrem	42	54	78
10	(Czech Republic) Charlotte Cholevová	41	70	59
10	(Iran) Fatemeh Merikh	41	87	47

=== Top goalkeepers ===
Rank	Name	%	Saves	Shots
1	(Sweden) Irma Schjött	58	18	31
2	(Norway) Olivia Lykke Nygaard	56	10	18
3	(Montenegro) Marta Batinović	51	40	78
4	(Denmark) Anna Kristensen	50	11	22
5	(Japan) Atsuko Baba	49	26	53
6	(Norway) Silje Solberg-Østhassel	40	65	161
7	(Croatia) Lucija Bešen	39	31	79
7	(Hungary) Zsófi Szemerey	39	12	31
9	(Netherlands) Rinka Duijndam	38	28	73
9	(Netherlands) Tess Lieder	38	18	47
9	(Netherlands) Yara ten Holte	38	79	209
