= 2024 African Women's Handball Championship =

Tournament details
- Host country: DR Congo
- Venue: 1 (in 1 host city)
- Dates: 27 November – 7 December
- Teams: 12 (from 1 confederation)

Final positions
- Champions: Angola (16th title)
- Runners-up: Senegal
- Third place: Tunisia
- Fourth place: Egypt

Tournament statistics
- Matches played: 46
- Goals scored: 2,335 (50.76 per match)
- Top scorers: (Cameroon) Laeticia Ateba (36 goals)

Awards
- Best player: (Republic of the Congo) Fanta Diagouraga

The 2024 African Women's Handball Championship was the 26th edition of the African Women's Handball Championship, held from 27 November to 7 December 2024 in Kinshasa, Democratic Republic of the Congo. It acted as the African qualifying tournament for the 2025 World Women's Handball Championship, with the top four nations qualifying.

Angola defeated Senegal in the final to win their fifth consecutive and 16th overall title.

== Qualified teams ==
The following countries registered for the competition:

- Algeria
- Angola
- Cameroon
- Cape Verde
- Congo
- DR Congo (host)
- Egypt
- Guinea
- Kenya
- Senegal
- Tunisia
- Uganda

== Draw ==
The draw took place on 19 September 2024 in Kinshasa, DR Congo.

=== Seeding ===
Pot 1	Pot 2	Pot 3	Pot 4	Pot 5	Pot 6
Angola; Congo	DR Congo; Senegal	Egypt; Tunisia	Algeria; Guinea	Cameroon; Cape Verde	Kenya; Uganda

== Preliminary round ==
All times are local (UTC+1).

=== Group A ===
Pos	Team	Pld	W	D	L	GF	GA	GD	Pts	Qualification
1	Congo	5	4	0	1	134	102	+32	8 (Note: Congo 2 Pts, +4 GD; Egypt 2 Pts, −1 GD; Senegal 2 Pts, −3 GD.)	Quarterfinals
2	Egypt	5	4	0	1	143	104	+39	8	Quarterfinals
3	Senegal	5	4	0	1	137	88	+49	8	Quarterfinals
4	Algeria	5	2	0	3	103	103	0	4	Quarterfinals
5	Cape Verde	5	1	0	4	117	135	−18	2	Presidents Cup
6	Kenya	5	0	0	5	84	186	−102	0	Presidents Cup

Source: CAN
Rules for classification: 1) points; 2) head-to-head points; 3) head-to-head goal difference; 4) head-to-head number of goals scored; 5) goal difference.
Notes:

27 November 2024; 08:00	Senegal	39–9	Kenya	Stade des Martyrs Gymnasium 1, Kinshasa
27 November 2024; 08:00	Sagna 8	(22–3)	Muyekho 5	Stade des Martyrs Gymnasium 1, Kinshasa
27 November 2024; 08:00	2× (yellow card) 1× (suspension)		7× (suspension)	Stade des Martyrs Gymnasium 1, Kinshasa

27 November 2024; 10:00	Algeria	20–16	Cape Verde	Stade des Martyrs Gymnasium 1, Kinshasa
27 November 2024; 10:00	Makhloufi 4	(11–6)	Veiga 4	Stade des Martyrs Gymnasium 1, Kinshasa
27 November 2024; 10:00	3× (suspension)		5× (suspension) 1× (red card)	Stade des Martyrs Gymnasium 1, Kinshasa

27 November 2024; 16:00	Congo	23–27	Egypt	Stade des Martyrs Gymnasium 1, Kinshasa
27 November 2024; 16:00	Divoko 7	(13–14)	Omar 9	Stade des Martyrs Gymnasium 1, Kinshasa
27 November 2024; 16:00	3× (yellow card) 3× (suspension)		3× (suspension)	Stade des Martyrs Gymnasium 1, Kinshasa

28 November 2024; 13:00	Kenya	20–37	Congo	Stade des Martyrs Gymnasium 2, Kinshasa
28 November 2024; 13:00	Muyekho 5	(5–11)	Domingos 6	Stade des Martyrs Gymnasium 2, Kinshasa
28 November 2024; 13:00	5× (suspension) 1× (red card)		4× (suspension)	Stade des Martyrs Gymnasium 2, Kinshasa

28 November 2024; 16:00	Senegal	37–22	Cape Verde	Stade des Martyrs Gymnasium 1, Kinshasa
28 November 2024; 16:00	Cissokho 5	(17–11)	Veiga 6	Stade des Martyrs Gymnasium 1, Kinshasa
28 November 2024; 16:00	1× (yellow card) 5× (suspension)		1× (suspension)	Stade des Martyrs Gymnasium 1, Kinshasa

28 November 2024; 17:00	Egypt	28–19	Algeria	Stade des Martyrs Gymnasium 2, Kinshasa
28 November 2024; 17:00	Abdelmalek 12	(14–11)	Makhloufi 8	Stade des Martyrs Gymnasium 2, Kinshasa
28 November 2024; 17:00	3× (suspension) 1× (red card)		6× (suspension) 1× (red card)	Stade des Martyrs Gymnasium 2, Kinshasa

30 November 2024; 14:00	Algeria	17–24	Congo	Stade des Martyrs Gymnasium 1, Kinshasa
30 November 2024; 14:00	Betzer 4	(9–12)	Diagouraga 6	Stade des Martyrs Gymnasium 1, Kinshasa
30 November 2024; 14:00	1× (yellow card) 3× (suspension)		4× (suspension) 1× (red card)	Stade des Martyrs Gymnasium 1, Kinshasa

30 November 2024; 15:00	Cape Verde	34–26	Kenya	Stade des Martyrs Gymnasium 2, Kinshasa
30 November 2024; 15:00	Veiga 11	(18–13)	Machuma 8	Stade des Martyrs Gymnasium 2, Kinshasa
30 November 2024; 15:00	7× (suspension)		6× (suspension)	Stade des Martyrs Gymnasium 2, Kinshasa

30 November 2024; 16:00	Egypt	16–21	Senegal	Stade des Martyrs Gymnasium 1, Kinshasa
30 November 2024; 16:00	Omar, Rady 4	(8–10)	Sagna 6	Stade des Martyrs Gymnasium 1, Kinshasa
30 November 2024; 16:00	1× (suspension)		1× (yellow card) 2× (suspension)	Stade des Martyrs Gymnasium 1, Kinshasa

1 December 2024; 14:00	Congo	25–21	Cape Verde	Stade des Martyrs Gymnasium 1, Kinshasa
1 December 2024; 14:00	Yimga 5	(13–8)	Veiga 6	Stade des Martyrs Gymnasium 1, Kinshasa
1 December 2024; 14:00	5× (suspension) 2× (red card)		1× (yellow card) 5× (suspension)	Stade des Martyrs Gymnasium 1, Kinshasa

1 December 2024; 15:00	Egypt	45–17	Kenya	Stade des Martyrs Gymnasium 2, Kinshasa
1 December 2024; 15:00	Khaled 9	(24–6)	Achieng, Muyoka 3	Stade des Martyrs Gymnasium 2, Kinshasa
1 December 2024; 15:00	1× (yellow card) 1× (suspension)		2× (suspension)	Stade des Martyrs Gymnasium 2, Kinshasa

1 December 2024; 17:00	Senegal	23–16	Algeria	Stade des Martyrs Gymnasium 2, Kinshasa
1 December 2024; 17:00	Dapina 7	(13–9)	Derradj 6	Stade des Martyrs Gymnasium 2, Kinshasa
1 December 2024; 17:00	5× (suspension)		4× (suspension)	Stade des Martyrs Gymnasium 2, Kinshasa

3 December 2024; 15:00	Cape Verde	24–27	Egypt	Stade des Martyrs Gymnasium 2, Kinshasa
3 December 2024; 15:00	Carvalho 5	(11–16)	Omar 7	Stade des Martyrs Gymnasium 2, Kinshasa
3 December 2024; 15:00	1× (suspension)		3× (suspension)	Stade des Martyrs Gymnasium 2, Kinshasa

3 December 2024; 16:00	Congo	25–17	Senegal	Stade des Martyrs Gymnasium 1, Kinshasa
3 December 2024; 16:00	Diagouraga 7	(13–8)	Sagna 4	Stade des Martyrs Gymnasium 1, Kinshasa
3 December 2024; 16:00	3× (suspension)		1× (suspension)	Stade des Martyrs Gymnasium 1, Kinshasa

3 December 2024; 17:00	Algeria	31–12	Kenya	Stade des Martyrs Gymnasium 2, Kinshasa
3 December 2024; 17:00	Selmani 7	(17–7)	Muyekho 3	Stade des Martyrs Gymnasium 2, Kinshasa
3 December 2024; 17:00	1× (suspension)		5× (suspension)	Stade des Martyrs Gymnasium 2, Kinshasa

=== Group B ===
Pos	Team	Pld	W	D	L	GF	GA	GD	Pts	Qualification
1	Angola	5	5	0	0	188	85	+103	10	Quarterfinals
2	Cameroon	5	4	0	1	128	116	+12	8	Quarterfinals
3	DR Congo (H)	5	3	0	2	133	123	+10	6	Quarterfinals
4	Tunisia	5	1	1	3	141	128	+13	3 (Note: Tunisia 28–28 Guinea)	Quarterfinals
5	Guinea	5	1	1	3	148	149	−1	3	Presidents Cup
6	Uganda	5	0	0	5	78	215	−137	0	Presidents Cup

Source: CAN
Rules for classification: 1) points; 2) head-to-head points; 3) head-to-head goal difference; 4) head-to-head number of goals scored; 5) goal difference.
(H) Hosts
Notes:

27 November 2024; 12:00	Guinea	26–32	Cameroon	Stade des Martyrs Gymnasium 1, Kinshasa
27 November 2024; 12:00	Fofana, Kanté 6	(15–12)	Ateba 12	Stade des Martyrs Gymnasium 1, Kinshasa
27 November 2024; 12:00	1× (yellow card) 1× (suspension)		1× (yellow card) 5× (suspension)	Stade des Martyrs Gymnasium 1, Kinshasa

27 November 2024; 14:00	Angola	36–23	Tunisia	Stade des Martyrs Gymnasium 1, Kinshasa
27 November 2024; 14:00	Nenganga 10	(18–7)	Aouij 5	Stade des Martyrs Gymnasium 1, Kinshasa
27 November 2024; 14:00	1× (yellow card) 4× (suspension)		3× (suspension)	Stade des Martyrs Gymnasium 1, Kinshasa

27 November 2024; 19:30	DR Congo	38–11	Uganda	Stade des Martyrs Gymnasium 1, Kinshasa
27 November 2024; 19:30	Kieny 8	(17–3)	three players 2	Stade des Martyrs Gymnasium 1, Kinshasa
27 November 2024; 19:30	4× (suspension)		4× (suspension)	Stade des Martyrs Gymnasium 1, Kinshasa

28 November 2024; 14:00	Tunisia	28–28	Guinea	Stade des Martyrs Gymnasium 1, Kinshasa
28 November 2024; 14:00	Belhadj 6	(14–14)	Guirassy 7	Stade des Martyrs Gymnasium 1, Kinshasa
28 November 2024; 14:00	4× (suspension)		1× (yellow card) 4× (suspension)	Stade des Martyrs Gymnasium 1, Kinshasa

28 November 2024; 15:00	Uganda	11–46	Angola	Stade des Martyrs Gymnasium 2, Kinshasa
28 November 2024; 15:00	Akongo 4	(1–31)	Quizelete 12	Stade des Martyrs Gymnasium 2, Kinshasa
28 November 2024; 15:00	5× (suspension)		2× (suspension)	Stade des Martyrs Gymnasium 2, Kinshasa

28 November 2024; 18:00	DR Congo	23–25	Cameroon	Stade des Martyrs Gymnasium 1, Kinshasa
28 November 2024; 18:00	Mwadi-Kabamba 5	(13–12)	Ateba 13	Stade des Martyrs Gymnasium 1, Kinshasa
28 November 2024; 18:00	1× (yellow card) 4× (suspension)		1× (yellow card) 2× (suspension)	Stade des Martyrs Gymnasium 1, Kinshasa

30 November 2024; 13:00	Cameroon	36–16	Uganda	Stade des Martyrs Gymnasium 2, Kinshasa
30 November 2024; 13:00	Magba 6	(17–6)	Nakamya 7	Stade des Martyrs Gymnasium 2, Kinshasa
30 November 2024; 13:00	7× (suspension)		1× (yellow card) 3× (suspension)	Stade des Martyrs Gymnasium 2, Kinshasa

30 November 2024; 17:00	Angola	35–22	Guinea	Stade des Martyrs Gymnasium 2, Kinshasa
30 November 2024; 17:00	Cazanga 6	(21–12)	Guirassy 8	Stade des Martyrs Gymnasium 2, Kinshasa
30 November 2024; 17:00	1× (yellow card) 2× (suspension)		3× (suspension)	Stade des Martyrs Gymnasium 2, Kinshasa

30 November 2024; 18:00	Tunisia	23–25	DR Congo	Stade des Martyrs Gymnasium 1, Kinshasa
30 November 2024; 18:00	Hamrouni 6	(8–11)	Mwasesa 8	Stade des Martyrs Gymnasium 1, Kinshasa
30 November 2024; 18:00	1× (yellow card) 3× (suspension)		1× (yellow card) 6× (suspension)	Stade des Martyrs Gymnasium 1, Kinshasa

1 December 2024; 13:00	Uganda	18–47	Tunisia	Stade des Martyrs Gymnasium 2, Kinshasa
1 December 2024; 13:00		(6–26)		Stade des Martyrs Gymnasium 2, Kinshasa

1 December 2024; 16:00	Cameroon	14–31	Angola	Stade des Martyrs Gymnasium 1, Kinshasa
1 December 2024; 16:00	Ebanga 5	(9–17)	Fonseca 7	Stade des Martyrs Gymnasium 1, Kinshasa
1 December 2024; 16:00	2× (suspension)		1× (suspension)	Stade des Martyrs Gymnasium 1, Kinshasa

1 December 2024; 18:00	Guinea	24–32	DR Congo	Stade des Martyrs Gymnasium 1, Kinshasa
1 December 2024; 18:00	Guirassy 5	(12–16)	Mwasesa 8	Stade des Martyrs Gymnasium 1, Kinshasa
1 December 2024; 18:00	2× (yellow card) 6× (suspension)		3× (suspension)	Stade des Martyrs Gymnasium 1, Kinshasa

3 December 2024; 13:00	Guinea	48–22	Uganda	Stade des Martyrs Gymnasium 2, Kinshasa
3 December 2024; 13:00	S. Camara 9	(22–11)	Aber 6	Stade des Martyrs Gymnasium 2, Kinshasa
3 December 2024; 13:00	1× (yellow card) 4× (suspension)		7× (suspension) 1× (red card)	Stade des Martyrs Gymnasium 2, Kinshasa

3 December 2024; 14:00	Tunisia	20–21	Cameroon	Stade des Martyrs Gymnasium 1, Kinshasa
3 December 2024; 14:00	Belhadj 7	(13–12)	Ebanga 5	Stade des Martyrs Gymnasium 1, Kinshasa
3 December 2024; 14:00	1× (yellow card) 4× (suspension)		4× (suspension)	Stade des Martyrs Gymnasium 1, Kinshasa

3 December 2024; 18:00	DR Congo	15–40	Angola	Stade des Martyrs Gymnasium 1, Kinshasa
3 December 2024; 18:00	Mwasesa 4	(9–21)	Kassoma 6	Stade des Martyrs Gymnasium 1, Kinshasa
3 December 2024; 18:00	3× (suspension)			Stade des Martyrs Gymnasium 1, Kinshasa

== Presidents Cup ==
=== Bracket ===
9–12th place semifinals
4 December
Kenya	12
Guinea	34
4 December
Cape Verde	34
Uganda	32

Ninth place game
6 December
Guinea	31
Cape Verde	17
Eleventh place game
5 December
Kenya	25
Uganda	34

=== 9–12th place semifinals ===
4 December 2024; 12:00	Kenya	12–34	Guinea	Stade des Martyrs Gymnasium 2, Kinshasa
4 December 2024; 12:00	Lutengeya 5	(5–22)	M. Camara 9	Stade des Martyrs Gymnasium 2, Kinshasa
4 December 2024; 12:00	6× (suspension)		3× (suspension)	Stade des Martyrs Gymnasium 2, Kinshasa

4 December 2024; 14:00	Cape Verde	34–32	Uganda	Stade des Martyrs Gymnasium 2, Kinshasa
4 December 2024; 14:00	Almeida 8	(14–17)	Nakamya 14	Stade des Martyrs Gymnasium 2, Kinshasa
4 December 2024; 14:00	1× (suspension)		5× (suspension)	Stade des Martyrs Gymnasium 2, Kinshasa

=== Eleventh place game ===
5 December 2024; 16:00	Kenya	25–34	Uganda	Stade des Martyrs Gymnasium 2, Kinshasa
5 December 2024; 16:00	Katheu 8	(13–12)	Aber, Nakamya 7	Stade des Martyrs Gymnasium 2, Kinshasa
5 December 2024; 16:00	3× (suspension)		3× (suspension)	Stade des Martyrs Gymnasium 2, Kinshasa

=== Ninth place game ===
6 December 2024; 13:30	Guinea	31–17	Cape Verde	Stade des Martyrs Gymnasium 1, Kinshasa
6 December 2024; 13:30	Sankhon 6	(19–8)	Veiga 4	Stade des Martyrs Gymnasium 1, Kinshasa
6 December 2024; 13:30	3× (suspension)		7× (suspension)	Stade des Martyrs Gymnasium 1, Kinshasa

== Knockout stage ==
=== Bracket ===
Quarter-finals
4 December
Congo	24
Tunisia	28
4 December
Cameroon	19
Senegal	26
4 December
Egypt	23
DR Congo	22
4 December
Angola	34
Algeria	15

Semi-finals
6 December
Tunisia	18
Senegal	26
6 December
Egypt	22
Angola	36

Final
7 December
Senegal	18
Angola	27
Third place
7 December
Tunisia	25
Egypt	22

Fifth place bracket

5–8th place semifinals
5 December
Congo	19
Cameroon	17
5 December
DR Congo	33
Algeria	17

Fifth place game
6 December
Congo	28
DR Congo	30
Seventh place game
6 December
Cameroon	29
Algeria	24

=== Quarterfinals ===
4 December 2024; 11:00	Congo	24–28	Tunisia	Stade des Martyrs Gymnasium 1, Kinshasa
4 December 2024; 11:00	Diagouraga 6	(11–13)	Hachana 8	Stade des Martyrs Gymnasium 1, Kinshasa
4 December 2024; 11:00	1× (yellow card) 2× (suspension)		1× (yellow card) 2× (suspension) 1× (red card)	Stade des Martyrs Gymnasium 1, Kinshasa

4 December 2024; 13:30	Angola	34–15	Algeria	Stade des Martyrs Gymnasium 1, Kinshasa
4 December 2024; 13:30	four players 5	(19–8)	Curabec 5	Stade des Martyrs Gymnasium 1, Kinshasa
4 December 2024; 13:30	2× (suspension)		2× (suspension)	Stade des Martyrs Gymnasium 1, Kinshasa

4 December 2024; 16:00	Cameroon	19–26	Senegal	Stade des Martyrs Gymnasium 1, Kinshasa
4 December 2024; 16:00	Ateba 6	(9–12)	Sagna 7	Stade des Martyrs Gymnasium 1, Kinshasa
4 December 2024; 16:00	1× (suspension)		2× (suspension)	Stade des Martyrs Gymnasium 1, Kinshasa

4 December 2024; 18:30	Egypt	23–22	DR Congo	Stade des Martyrs Gymnasium 1, Kinshasa
4 December 2024; 18:30	four players 4	(11–11)	Mwasesa 5	Stade des Martyrs Gymnasium 1, Kinshasa
4 December 2024; 18:30	1× (suspension)		2× (suspension)	Stade des Martyrs Gymnasium 1, Kinshasa

=== 5–8th place semifinals ===
5 December 2024; 16:00	Congo	19–17	Cameroon	Stade des Martyrs Gymnasium 1, Kinshasa
5 December 2024; 16:00	Ngombele 8	(10–9)	Ebanga, Yuoh 3	Stade des Martyrs Gymnasium 1, Kinshasa
5 December 2024; 16:00			1× (yellow card) 3× (suspension)	Stade des Martyrs Gymnasium 1, Kinshasa

5 December 2024; 18:00	DR Congo	33–17	Algeria	Stade des Martyrs Gymnasium 1, Kinshasa
5 December 2024; 18:00	Mwasesa 6	(14–7)	Makhloufi 7	Stade des Martyrs Gymnasium 1, Kinshasa
5 December 2024; 18:00	2× (suspension)		1× (yellow card) 3× (suspension)	Stade des Martyrs Gymnasium 1, Kinshasa

=== Semifinals ===
6 December 2024; 15:30	Tunisia	18–26	Senegal	Stade des Martyrs Gymnasium 1, Kinshasa
6 December 2024; 15:30	Ben Abdallah 5	(9–13)	Sagna 9	Stade des Martyrs Gymnasium 1, Kinshasa
6 December 2024; 15:30	1× (yellow card) 2× (suspension)		3× (suspension)	Stade des Martyrs Gymnasium 1, Kinshasa

6 December 2024; 18:00	Egypt	22–36	Angola	Stade des Martyrs Gymnasium 1, Kinshasa
6 December 2024; 18:00	Ayman 5	(11–17)	Paulo 7	Stade des Martyrs Gymnasium 1, Kinshasa
6 December 2024; 18:00			1× (yellow card) 2× (suspension)	Stade des Martyrs Gymnasium 1, Kinshasa

=== Seventh place game ===
6 December 2024; 09:30	Cameroon	29–24	Algeria	Stade des Martyrs Gymnasium 1, Kinshasa
6 December 2024; 09:30	Nnomo 8	(16–11)	Makhloufi 9	Stade des Martyrs Gymnasium 1, Kinshasa
6 December 2024; 09:30	2× (suspension)		2× (suspension)	Stade des Martyrs Gymnasium 1, Kinshasa

=== Fifth place game ===
6 December 2024; 11:30	Congo	28–30	DR Congo	Stade des Martyrs Gymnasium 1, Kinshasa
6 December 2024; 11:30	Ngombele 7	(15–16)	six players 4	Stade des Martyrs Gymnasium 1, Kinshasa
6 December 2024; 11:30	1× (yellow card) 5× (suspension)		2× (suspension)	Stade des Martyrs Gymnasium 1, Kinshasa

=== Third place game ===
7 December 2024; 16:30	Tunisia	25–22	Egypt	Stade des Martyrs Gymnasium 1, Kinshasa
7 December 2024; 16:30	Aouij 8	(9–6)	Rady, Osama 6	Stade des Martyrs Gymnasium 1, Kinshasa
7 December 2024; 16:30	1× (yellow card) 5× (suspension)		1× (yellow card) 2× (suspension)	Stade des Martyrs Gymnasium 1, Kinshasa

=== Final ===
7 December 2024; 19:00	Senegal	18–27	Angola	Stade des Martyrs Gymnasium 1, Kinshasa
7 December 2024; 19:00	Sagna 6	(8–13)	Kassoma, Paulo 6	Stade des Martyrs Gymnasium 1, Kinshasa
7 December 2024; 19:00	1× (yellow card) 2× (suspension)		2× (suspension)	Stade des Martyrs Gymnasium 1, Kinshasa

== Final standing ==
Rank	Team
1st place, gold medalist(s)	Angola
2nd place, silver medalist(s)	Senegal
3rd place, bronze medalist(s)	Tunisia
4	Egypt
5	DR Congo
6	Congo
7	Cameroon
8	Algeria
9	Guinea
10	Cape Verde
11	Uganda
12	Kenya

Team qualified for the 2025 World Championship

== All-Star Team ==
The All-star team was announced on 9 December 2024.

Position	Player
Goalkeeper	(Egypt) Mai Aly
Right wing	(Angola) Natalia Fonseca
Right back	(Democratic Republic of the Congo) Alexandra Shunu
Centre back	(Republic of the Congo) Fanta Diagouraga
Left back	(Senegal) Soukeina Sagna
Left wing	(Democratic Republic of the Congo) Laugane Pina
Pivot	(Angola) Albertina Kassoma
MVP	(Republic of the Congo) Fanta Diagouraga
