= Handball at the 2011 African Games – Women's tournament =

Handball at the 2011 African Games Women's tournament
Tournament details
- Host country: Mozambique
- Venue: 1 (in 1 host city)
- Dates: 08–17 September 2011
- Teams: 11

Final positions
- Champions: Angola (5th title)
- Runners-up: Congo
- Third place: Cameroon
- Fourth place: Algeria

The 2011 edition of the Women's Handball Tournament of the African Games was the 8th, organized by the African Handball Confederation and played under the auspices of the International Handball Federation, the handball sport governing body. The tournament ran from September 8–17, 2011 in Maputo, Mozambique, contested by 12 national teams and won by Angola.

== Participating teams ==
- Angola
- Algeria
- Cameroon
- Congo
- Cape Verde
- DR Congo
- Ghana
- Kenya
- Mozambique
- Madagascar
- Nigeria
- Senegal

== Preliminary round ==
The draw was held on May 6, 2011.

=== Group A ===
Team	Pld	W	D	L	GF	GA	GD	Pts
Cameroon	2	2	0	0	62	44	+18	4
Algeria	2	1	0	1	56	45	+11	2
Senegal	2	0	0	2	37	66	−29	0

8 September 2011; 17:00	Cameroon	35 – 19	Senegal
8 September 2011; 17:00		(14–5)

10 September 2011; 17:00	Cameroon	27 – 25	Algeria
10 September 2011; 17:00		(14–15)

11 September 2011; 09:00	Algeria	30 – 18	Senegal
11 September 2011; 09:00		(13–11)

=== Group B ===
Team	Pld	W	D	L	GF	GA	GD	Pts
Cape Verde	2	2	0	0	57	48	+9	4
Kenya	2	1	0	1	44	50	−6	2
Mozambique	2	0	0	2	46	49	−3	0

8 September 2011; 19:00	Kenya	22 – 20	Mozambique
8 September 2011; 19:00		(10–13)

9 September 2011; 19:00	Cape Verde	27 – 26	Mozambique
9 September 2011; 19:00		(12–14)

11 September 2011; 11:00	Cape Verde	30 – 22	Kenya
11 September 2011; 11:00		(13–11)

=== Group C ===
Team	Pld	W	D	L	GF	GA	GD	Pts
Angola	2	2	0	0	96	24	+72	4
DR Congo	2	1	0	1	54	56	−2	2
Ghana	2	0	0	2	22	92	−70	0

9 September 2011; 13:00	Angola	55 – 7	Ghana
9 September 2011; 13:00		(29–3)

10 September 2011; 17:00	Angola	41 – 17	DR Congo
10 September 2011; 17:00		(20–8)

11 September 2011; 17:00	DR Congo	37 – 15	Ghana
11 September 2011; 17:00		(16–8)

=== Group D ===
Team	Pld	W	D	L	GF	GA	GD	Pts
Congo	2	2	0	0	65	34	+31	4
Nigeria	2	1	0	1	58	40	+18	2
Madagascar	2	0	0	2	21	70	−49	0

9 September 2011; 15:00	Congo	30 – 23	Nigeria
9 September 2011; 15:00		(15–14)

10 September 2011; 19:00	Congo	35 – 11	Madagascar
10 September 2011; 19:00		(16–5)

11 September 2011; 19:00	Nigeria	35 – 10	Madagascar
11 September 2011; 19:00		(19–5)

== Knockout stage ==
=== Championship bracket ===
Quarter-finals
Cameroon	31
Kenya	16
Congo	26
DR Congo	25
Cape Verde	24
Algeria	30
Angola	49
Nigeria	16

Semi-finals
Cameroon	16
Congo	21
Algeria	18
Angola	32

Final
Congo	23
Angola	41
Third place
Cameroon	26
Algeria	20

==== Quarterfinals ====
14 September 2011; 13:00	Cameroon	31 – 16	Kenya
14 September 2011; 13:00		(14–0)

14 September 2011; 15:00	Algeria	30 – 24	Cape Verde
14 September 2011; 15:00		(14–13)

14 September 2011; 17:00	Angola	49 – 16	Nigeria
14 September 2011; 17:00		(26–8)

14 September 2011; 19:00	Congo	26 – 25	DR Congo
14 September 2011; 19:00		(14–12)

==== Semifinals ====
15 September 2011; 15:00	Congo	21 – 16	Cameroon
15 September 2011; 15:00		(8–10)

15 September 2011; 16:30	Angola	32 – 18	Algeria
15 September 2011; 16:30		(13–9)

==== Third place game ====
17 September 2011; 09:00	Cameroon	26 – 20	Algeria
17 September 2011; 09:00		(11–12)

==== Final ====
17 September 2011; 16:00	Angola	41 – 23	Congo
17 September 2011; 16:00		(22–11)

=== 5–8th place bracket ===
Semifinals
Kenya	21
DR Congo	33
Cape Verde	21
Nigeria	25

Fifth place
DR Congo	10
Nigeria	24
Seventh place
Kenya	26
Cape Verde	23

==== Semifinals ====
15 September 2011; 11:00	DR Congo	33 – 21	Kenya
15 September 2011; 11:00		(15–9)

15 September 2011; 12:30	Nigeria	25 – 21	Cape Verde
15 September 2011; 12:30		(12–13)

==== Seventh place game ====
16 September 2011; 11:00	Kenya	26 – 23	Cape Verde
16 September 2011; 11:00		(11–9)

==== Fifth place game ====
16 September 2011; 14:00	Nigeria	24 – 10	DR Congo
16 September 2011; 14:00		(22–11)

=== 9–12th place bracket ===
Semifinals
Senegal	31
Mozambique	29
Ghana	26
Madagascar	24

Ninth place
Senegal	33
Ghana	26
Eleventh place
Mozambique	30
Madagascar	23

==== Semifinals ====
12 September 2011; 17:00	Senegal	31 – 29	Mozambique
12 September 2011; 17:00		(11–16)

12 September 2011; 19:00	Ghana	26 – 24	Madagascar
12 September 2011; 19:00		(14–8)

==== Eleventh place game ====
14 September 2011; 09:00	Mozambique	30 – 23	Madagascar
14 September 2011; 09:00		(16–8)

==== Ninth place game ====
14 September 2011; 11:00	Senegal	33 – 26	Ghana
14 September 2011; 11:00		(18–17)

== Final standings ==
Rank	Women			
Rank	Team	Pld	W	L
1st place, gold medalist(s)	Angola	5	5	0
2nd place, silver medalist(s)	Congo	5	4	1
3rd place, bronze medalist(s)	Cameroon	5	4	1
4.	Algeria	5	2	3
Eliminated at the quarterfinals
5.	Nigeria	5	3	2
6.	DR Congo	5	2	3
7.	Kenya	5	2	3
8.	Cape Verde	5	2	3
Preliminary round 5th placers
9.	Senegal	4	2	2
10.	Ghana	4	1	3
11.	Mozambique	4	1	3
12.	Madagascar	4	0	4

2011 African Games Women's Handball winner

Angola
Fifth title

== See also ==
- Handball at the 2011 All-Africa Games – Men's tournament
