= 2021 African Women's Handball Championship =

Tournament details
- Host country: Cameroon
- Venue: 1 (in 1 host city)
- Dates: 8–18 June 2021
- Teams: 11 (from 1 confederation)

Final positions
- Champions: Angola (14th title)
- Runners-up: Cameroon
- Third place: Tunisia
- Fourth place: Congo

Tournament statistics
- Matches played: 30
- Goals scored: 1,507 (50.23 per match)

Awards
- Best player: (Angola) Isabel Guialo

The 2021 African Women's Handball Championship was the 24th edition of the African Women's Handball Championship, which was originally scheduled to take place from 2 to 12 December 2020. Due to the COVID-19 pandemic, it was rescheduled to 8 to 18 June 2021 in Yaoundé, Cameroon. The tournament was held under the aegis of African Handball Confederation and acted as the African qualifying tournament for the 2021 World Women's Handball Championship.

Angola won their third straight and 14th overall title after defeating Cameroon in the final.

== Venues ==
Host city	Venue	Capacity
Yaoundé	Yaoundé Multipurpose Sports Complex	5,263

== Draw ==
The draw was made on 1 April 2021.

== Preliminary round ==
All times are local (UTC+1).

=== Group A ===
Pos	Team	Pld	W	D	L	GF	GA	GD	Pts	Qualification
1	Tunisia	3	3	0	0	104	56	+48	6	Quarterfinals
2	Senegal	3	2	0	1	87	66	+21	4	Quarterfinals
3	Guinea	3	1	0	2	82	78	+4	2	Quarterfinals
4	Madagascar	3	0	0	3	48	121	−73	0	

Rules for classification: 1) points; 2) head-to-head points; 3) head-to-head goal difference; 4) head-to-head number of goals scored; 5) goal difference.

9 June 2021; 14:00	Senegal	42–16	Madagascar	Yaoundé Multipurpose Sports Complex, Yaoundé
9 June 2021; 14:00		(20–9)		Yaoundé Multipurpose Sports Complex, Yaoundé

9 June 2021; 18:00	Tunisia	30–27	Guinea	Yaoundé Multipurpose Sports Complex, Yaoundé
9 June 2021; 18:00		(15–12)		Yaoundé Multipurpose Sports Complex, Yaoundé

11 June 2021; 14:00	Madagascar	16–44	Tunisia	Yaoundé Multipurpose Sports Complex, Yaoundé
11 June 2021; 14:00		(10–21)		Yaoundé Multipurpose Sports Complex, Yaoundé

11 June 2021; 18:00	Guinea	20–32	Senegal	Yaoundé Multipurpose Sports Complex, Yaoundé
11 June 2021; 18:00		(11–16)		Yaoundé Multipurpose Sports Complex, Yaoundé

13 June 2021; 14:00	Guinea	35–16	Madagascar	Yaoundé Multipurpose Sports Complex, Yaoundé; Referees: Depesquidoux, Ndemdou (CMR)
13 June 2021; 14:00		(19–10)		Yaoundé Multipurpose Sports Complex, Yaoundé; Referees: Depesquidoux, Ndemdou (CMR)

13 June 2021; 16:00	Senegal	13–30	Tunisia	Yaoundé Multipurpose Sports Complex, Yaoundé
13 June 2021; 16:00		(7–16)		Yaoundé Multipurpose Sports Complex, Yaoundé

=== Group B ===
Pos	Team	Pld	W	D	L	GF	GA	GD	Pts	Qualification
1	Cameroon	3	3	0	0	97	56	+41	6	Quarterfinals
2	DR Congo	3	2	0	1	98	58	+40	4	Quarterfinals
3	Nigeria	3	1	0	2	61	87	−26	2	Quarterfinals
4	Kenya	3	0	0	3	53	108	−55	0	

Rules for classification: 1) points; 2) head-to-head points; 3) head-to-head goal difference; 4) head-to-head number of goals scored; 5) goal difference.

8 June 2021; 14:00	Nigeria	16–35	DR Congo	Yaoundé Multipurpose Sports Complex, Yaoundé; Referees: El-Saied, El-Saied (EGY)
8 June 2021; 14:00		(3–18)		Yaoundé Multipurpose Sports Complex, Yaoundé; Referees: El-Saied, El-Saied (EGY)

8 June 2021; 18:00	Cameroon	40–16	Kenya	Yaoundé Multipurpose Sports Complex, Yaoundé; Referees: Diop, Faye (SEN)
8 June 2021; 18:00		(21–8)		Yaoundé Multipurpose Sports Complex, Yaoundé; Referees: Diop, Faye (SEN)

10 June 2021; 16:00	DR Congo	42–16	Kenya	Yaoundé Multipurpose Sports Complex, Yaoundé
10 June 2021; 16:00		(21–4)		Yaoundé Multipurpose Sports Complex, Yaoundé

10 June 2021; 18:00	Cameroon	31–19	Nigeria	Yaoundé Multipurpose Sports Complex, Yaoundé
10 June 2021; 18:00		(14–13)		Yaoundé Multipurpose Sports Complex, Yaoundé

12 June 2021; 16:00	Nigeria	26–21	Kenya	Yaoundé Multipurpose Sports Complex, Yaoundé
12 June 2021; 16:00		(12–11)		Yaoundé Multipurpose Sports Complex, Yaoundé

12 June 2021; 18:00	DR Congo	21–26	Cameroon	Yaoundé Multipurpose Sports Complex, Yaoundé
12 June 2021; 18:00		(10–10)		Yaoundé Multipurpose Sports Complex, Yaoundé

=== Group C ===
Pos	Team	Pld	W	D	L	GF	GA	GD	Pts	Qualification
1	Angola	2	2	0	0	68	38	+30	4	Quarterfinals
2	Congo	2	1	0	1	58	52	+6	2	Quarterfinals
3	Cape Verde	2	0	0	2	37	73	−36	0	
4	Algeria (Note: Algeria withdrew before the tournament, arguing they had not enough time to prepare for the tournament after nearly two years of hibernation.)	0	0	0	0	0	0	0	0	Withdrew

Rules for classification: 1) points; 2) head-to-head points; 3) head-to-head goal difference; 4) head-to-head number of goals scored; 5) goal difference.
Notes:

9 June 2021; 16:00	Angola	39–14	Cape Verde	Yaoundé Multipurpose Sports Complex, Yaoundé; Referees: Krichen, Makhlouf (TUN)
9 June 2021; 16:00	Bernado 7	(16–5)	three players 3	Yaoundé Multipurpose Sports Complex, Yaoundé; Referees: Krichen, Makhlouf (TUN)
9 June 2021; 16:00	1× (suspension)	Report	1× (yellow card) 7× (suspension) 1× (red card)	Yaoundé Multipurpose Sports Complex, Yaoundé; Referees: Krichen, Makhlouf (TUN)

11 June 2021; 16:00	Cape Verde	23–34	Congo	Yaoundé Multipurpose Sports Complex, Yaoundé; Referees: Faye, Diop (SEN)
11 June 2021; 16:00	Almeida 9	(13–21)	Dorson 7	Yaoundé Multipurpose Sports Complex, Yaoundé; Referees: Faye, Diop (SEN)
11 June 2021; 16:00	4× (suspension)	Report	1× (yellow card) 6× (suspension)	Yaoundé Multipurpose Sports Complex, Yaoundé; Referees: Faye, Diop (SEN)

13 June 2021; 18:00	Angola	29–24	Congo	Yaoundé Multipurpose Sports Complex, Yaoundé
13 June 2021; 18:00		(16–11)		Yaoundé Multipurpose Sports Complex, Yaoundé

=== Ranking of third-placed teams ===
Pos	Team	Pld	W	D	L	GF	GA	GD	Pts	Qualification
1	Guinea	2	0	0	2	47	62	−15	0	Quarterfinals
2	Nigeria	2	0	0	2	35	66	−31	0	Quarterfinals
3	Cape Verde	2	0	0	2	37	73	−36	0	

Rules for classification: 1) points; 2) goal difference; 3) goals for.

== President's Cup ==
Pos	Team	Pld	W	D	L	GF	GA	GD	Pts
9	Cape Verde	2	2	0	0	57	38	+19	4
10	Kenya	2	1	0	1	55	57	−2	2
11	Madagascar	2	0	0	2	46	63	−17	0

Rules for classification: 1) points; 2) head-to-head points; 3) head-to-head goal difference; 4) head-to-head number of goals scored; 5) goal difference.

14 June 2021; 16:00	Madagascar	30–33	Kenya	Yaoundé Multipurpose Sports Complex, Yaoundé
14 June 2021; 16:00		(15–17)		Yaoundé Multipurpose Sports Complex, Yaoundé

15 June 2021; 20:00	Cape Verde	30–16	Madagascar	Yaoundé Multipurpose Sports Complex, Yaoundé; Referees: Depesquidoux, Ndemdou (CMR)
15 June 2021; 20:00	Almeida 7	(16–10)	Ravololonirina 5	Yaoundé Multipurpose Sports Complex, Yaoundé; Referees: Depesquidoux, Ndemdou (CMR)
15 June 2021; 20:00	2× (yellow card) 5× (suspension)	Report	1× (yellow card) 8× (suspension)	Yaoundé Multipurpose Sports Complex, Yaoundé; Referees: Depesquidoux, Ndemdou (CMR)

17 June 2021; 18:00	Cape Verde	27–22	Kenya	Yaoundé Multipurpose Sports Complex, Yaoundé
17 June 2021; 18:00		(12–12)		Yaoundé Multipurpose Sports Complex, Yaoundé

== Knockout stage ==
=== Bracket ===
Quarter-finals
15 June
Tunisia	27
Guinea	20
15 June
Angola	29
DR Congo	20
15 June
Cameroon	44
Nigeria	14
15 June
Congo	21
Senegal	20

Semi-finals
16 June
Tunisia	23
Angola (ET)	27
16 June
Cameroon	22
Congo	21

Final
18 June
Angola	25
Cameroon	15
Third place
18 June
Tunisia	22
Congo	17

Fifth place bracket

5–8th place semifinals
16 June
Guinea	26
DR Congo	33
16 June
Nigeria	15
Senegal	32

Fifth place game
17 June
DR Congo	14
Senegal	24
Seventh place game
17 June
Guinea	25
Nigeria	21

=== Quarterfinals ===
15 June 2021; 12:00	Angola	29–20	DR Congo	Yaoundé Multipurpose Sports Complex, Yaoundé
15 June 2021; 12:00		(15–10)		Yaoundé Multipurpose Sports Complex, Yaoundé

15 June 2021; 14:00	Tunisia	27–20	Guinea	Yaoundé Multipurpose Sports Complex, Yaoundé
15 June 2021; 14:00		(15–7)		Yaoundé Multipurpose Sports Complex, Yaoundé

15 June 2021; 16:00	Congo	21–20	Senegal	Yaoundé Multipurpose Sports Complex, Yaoundé
15 June 2021; 16:00		(11–6)		Yaoundé Multipurpose Sports Complex, Yaoundé

15 June 2021; 18:00	Cameroon	44–14	Nigeria	Yaoundé Multipurpose Sports Complex, Yaoundé
15 June 2021; 18:00		(26–3)		Yaoundé Multipurpose Sports Complex, Yaoundé

=== 5–8th place semifinals ===
16 June 2021; 10:00	Guinea	26–33	DR Congo	Yaoundé Multipurpose Sports Complex, Yaoundé
16 June 2021; 10:00		(13–18)		Yaoundé Multipurpose Sports Complex, Yaoundé

16 June 2021; 12:00	Nigeria	15–32	Senegal	Yaoundé Multipurpose Sports Complex, Yaoundé
16 June 2021; 12:00		(4–16)		Yaoundé Multipurpose Sports Complex, Yaoundé

=== Semifinals ===
16 June 2021
15:30
Tunisia
23–27 (ET)
Angola
Yaoundé Multipurpose Sports Complex, Yaoundé

(12–11)

FT: 21–21 ET: 2–6

16 June 2021; 18:00	Cameroon	22–21	Congo	Yaoundé Multipurpose Sports Complex, Yaoundé
16 June 2021; 18:00		(12–10)		Yaoundé Multipurpose Sports Complex, Yaoundé

=== Seventh place game ===
17 June 2021; 14:00	Guinea	25–21	Nigeria	Yaoundé Multipurpose Sports Complex, Yaoundé
17 June 2021; 14:00		(11–11)		Yaoundé Multipurpose Sports Complex, Yaoundé

=== Fifth place game ===
17 June 2021; 16:00	DR Congo	14–24	Senegal	Yaoundé Multipurpose Sports Complex, Yaoundé
17 June 2021; 16:00		(6–14)		Yaoundé Multipurpose Sports Complex, Yaoundé

=== Third place game ===
18 June 2021; 15:00	Tunisia	22–17	Congo	Yaoundé Multipurpose Sports Complex, Yaoundé
18 June 2021; 15:00		(12–7)		Yaoundé Multipurpose Sports Complex, Yaoundé

=== Final ===
18 June 2021; 18:00	Angola	25–15	Cameroon	Yaoundé Multipurpose Sports Complex, Yaoundé
18 June 2021; 18:00		(14–7)		Yaoundé Multipurpose Sports Complex, Yaoundé

== Final standing ==
Rank	Team
1st place, gold medalist(s)	Angola
2nd place, silver medalist(s)	Cameroon
3rd place, bronze medalist(s)	Tunisia
4	Congo
5	Senegal
6	DR Congo
7	Guinea
8	Nigeria
9	Cape Verde
10	Kenya
11	Madagascar

Team qualified for the 2021 World Championship

== All star team ==
- MVP: Isabel Guialo, Angola
- Goalkeeper: Fadia Omrani, Tunisia
- Left wing: Helena Paulo, Angola
- Right wing: Raïssa Dapina, Senegal
- Left back: Isabel Guialo, Angola
- Right back: Karichma Ekoh, Cameroon
- Centre back: Sondes Hachana, Tunisia
- Pivot: Albertina Kassoma, Angola
