= Soukeina Sagna =

French handball player (born 1998)

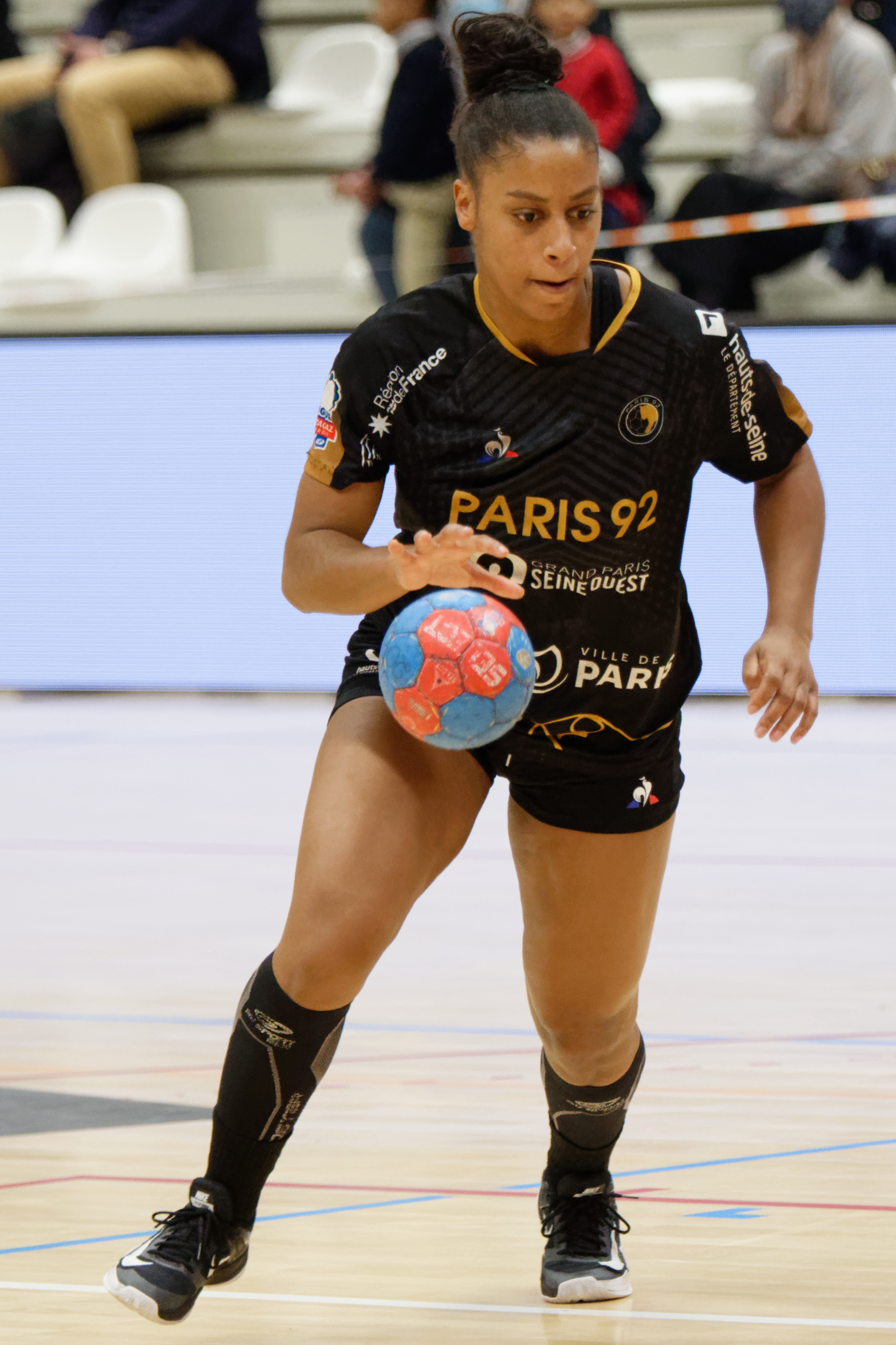
- Soukeina Sagna (2021)

Personal information
- Nationality: Senegalese, French
- Born: 17 April 1998 (age 28) Saint-Denis, France
- Height: 1.70 m (5 ft 7 in)

Sport
- Sport: Handball
- Position: Centre back
- Current club: Mérignac Handball

Senior clubs
- Years: Team
- 2014–2015: Mios-Bègles
- 2016: CA Bègles
- 2016-2021: HBC Celles-sur-Belle
- 2021-2022: Paris 92
- 2022-: Mérignac Handball
National team
- Years: Team
- 2021-: Senegal
Medal record
African Championship
Silver medal – second place	2024 Kinshasa

Soukeina Sagna (born 17 April 1998) is a French-Senegalese handballer who plays for Mérignac Handball and the Senegal national team.

Sagna competed at the 2016 Youth World Handball Championship as a member of the French national under-18 team, being the team's leading scorer.
