= Cape Verde women's national handball team =

Cape Verde

Information
- Association: Federaçao Caboverdiana de Andebol

Colours
1st	2nd

Results

African Championship
- Appearances: 3 (First in 2021)
- Best result: 9th (2021)
- Last updated on Unknown.

The Cape Verde women's national handball team is the national team of Cape Verde. It is governed by the Federaçao Caboverdiana de Andebol and takes part in international handball competitions.

== African Championship record ==
- 2021 – 9th place
- 2022 – 12th place
- 2024 – 10th place
- 2026 – Qualified
