= Madagascar women's national handball team =

Madagascar

Information
- Association: Fédération Malgache de Handball

Colours
1st	2nd

Results

African Championship
- Appearances: 2 (First in 2021)
- Best result: 11th (2021)
- Last updated on Unknown.

The Madagascar women's national handball team is the national team of Madagascar. It is governed by the Fédération Malgache de Handball and takes part in international handball competitions.

== African Championship record ==
- 2021 – 11th place
- 2022 – 13th place
