= Betchaïdelle Ngombele =

Congolese handball player

Personal information
- Nationality: Congolese
- Born: 23 March 2004 (age 22) Brazzaville, Republic of the Congo
- Height: 1.90 m (6 ft 3 in)

Sport
- Sport: Handball
- Position: Left back
- Current club: Metz Handball
- Number: 23

Senior clubs
- Years: Team
- 2022: CARA Brazzaville
- 2022 - 2025: RK Krim
- 2025 -: Metz Handball
National team
Years	Team	Apps	(Gls)
–	Congo	28	(36)
Medal record
African Championship
Bronze medal – third place	2022 Dakar
- Updated on 13 November 2023

Betchaïdelle Ngombele (born 23 March 2004) is a Congolese handball player for Metz Handball and the Congolese national team.

She participated at the 2021 World Women's Handball Championship in Spain.

With Metz Handball she won EHF Women Chamniops Legue in season 2025/2026.

== Career ==
She started her career at CARA Brazzaville, before joining Slovenian RK Krim in 2022 at age 17. Here she won the Slovenian championship in 2022, 2023 and 2024 and the Slovenian cup in 2022, 2023 and 2025. She also played in the Champions League with the Slovenian side, and scored 39 goals in 4 seasons in the top European competition.

From 2025 to 2026 she has signed a contract with French side Metz Handball.
