= Fanta Diagouraga =

Congolese handball player

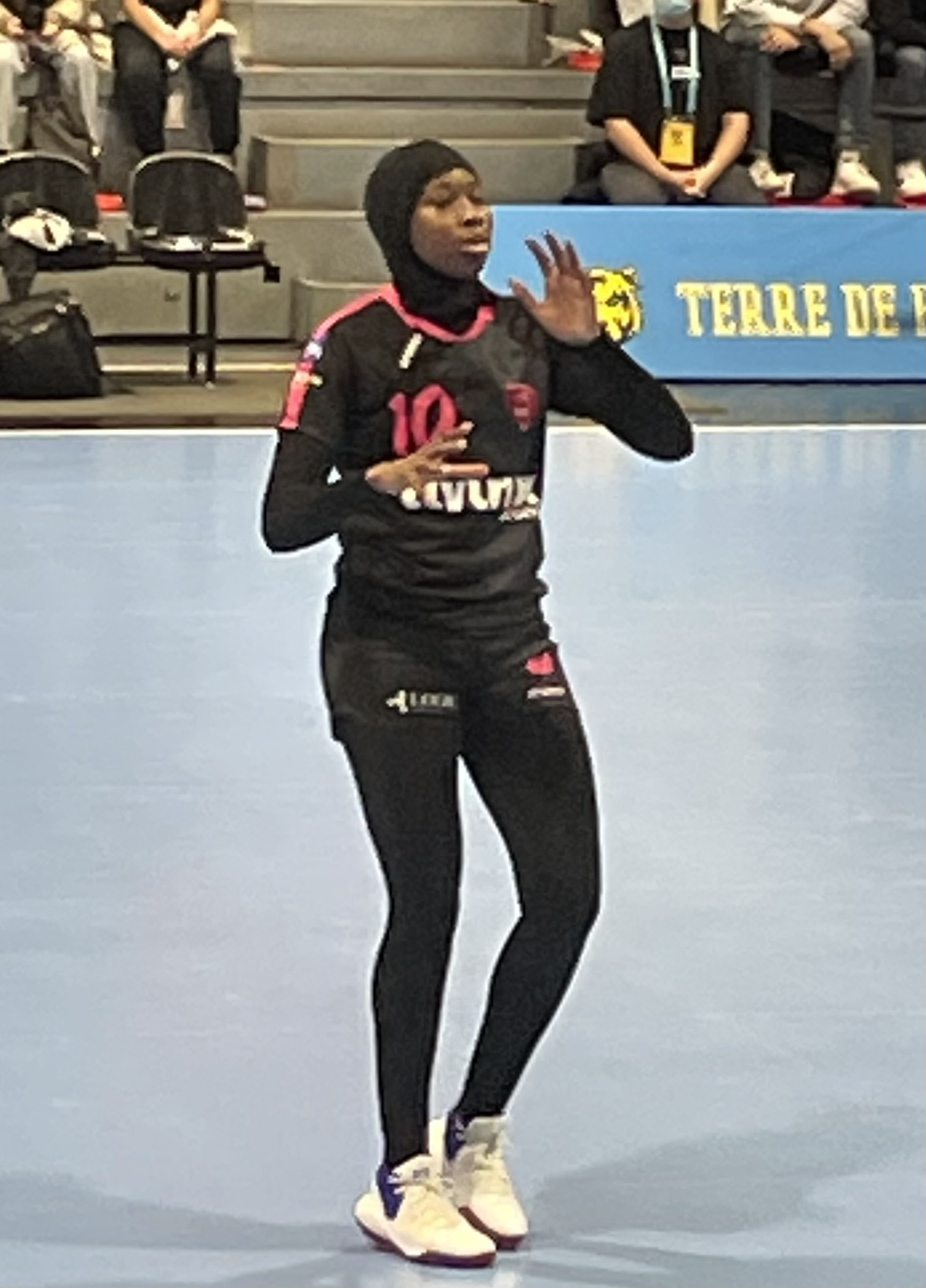

Personal information
- Nationality: Congolese
- Born: 30 June 2000 (age 26) France
- Height: 1.75 m (5 ft 9 in)

Sport
- Sport: Handball
- Position: Centre back
- Current club: HBC Celles-sur-Belle
- Number: 78

Youth career
- Years: Team
- –: CAO/ASFF Handball
- –: Montigny-le-Bretonneux
- 2016–2018: Issy-Paris Hand
- 2018–2020: JDA Dijon Handball

Senior clubs
- Years: Team
- 2020–2022: Noisy-le-Grand Handball
- 2022–: HBC Celles-sur-Belle
National team
Years	Team	Apps	(Gls)
–	Congo	0	(0)
Medal record
African Championship
Bronze medal – third place	2022 Dakar

Fanta Diagouraga (born 30 June 2000) is a Congolese handball player for French league club HBC Celles-sur-Belle and the Congolese national team.

She represented Congo at the 2021 World Women's Handball Championship in Spain.

She was the Division 2 Féminine topscorer during its 2021/2022 season, scoring 181 goals for Noisy-le-Grand HB.

== Achievements ==
=== International ===
- African Women's Handball Championship:
  - (bronze) 3rd in 2022
