= Handball at the 2015 African Games =

Tournament details
- Host country: Republic of the Congo
- Venue(s): 2 (in 1 host city)
- Dates: 10 – 19 September
- Teams: 24 (from 1 confederation)

Final positions
- Champions: Egypt (men); Angola (women)
- Runners-up: Angola (men); Cameroon (women)
- Third place: Congo (men); Senegal (women)
- Fourth place: Nigeria (men); Nigeria (women)

Handball at the 2015 African Games is held from September 10–19, 2015 at several venues.

== Participants ==
Ten men's and eleven women's teams qualified for the games, including host the country, the Republic of Congo.

Men
Group A	Group B	Group C	Group D
Libya; Senegal	Angola; Kenya; Nigeria	Congo; Ivory Coast	DR Congo; Egypt; Gabon

Women
Group A	Group B	Group C	Group D
Cameroon; Mali; Senegal	Burkina Faso; Congo	Angola; Kenya; Nigeria	DR Congo; Ivory Coast; Zambia

== Events ==
=== Schedule ===
P	Preliminaries	¼	Quarterfinals	½	Semifinals	F	Final

Event↓/Date →	Thu 10 Sep	Fri 11 Sep	Sat 12 Sep	Sun 13 Sep	Mon 14 Sep	Tue 15 Sep	Wed 16 Sep	Thu 17 Sep	Fri 18 Sep	Sat 19 Sep
Men		P		P	P	P	¼	¼	½	F
Women	P		P		P		¼		½	F

=== Medal summary ===
Event	Gold	Silver	Bronze
Men	Egypt; Alaa Ahmed; Fathi Hamad; Helmy Kharim; Hossam Mohab; Khaled Nour; Mamdouh Mohamed; Mohamed Hady; Mohamed Mamdouh; Mostafa Karim; Osama Mostafa; Samy Wisam; Tamer Mostafa Coach: Marwan Moustafa	Angola; Adelino Pestana; Adilson Maneco; Agnelo Quitongo; Augusto Dinzeia; Belchior Camuanga; Cláudio Lopes; Edgar Emanuel Abreu; Edvaldo Ferreira; Elsemar Pedro; Gilberto Figueira; Giovane Muachissengue; Julião Gaspar; Mário Tati; Osvaldo Mulenessa; Romé Hebo; Sérgio Lopes; Coach: Filipe Cruz	Congo; Armande Eloko; Brunel Ngolo; Christian Mahoungou; Evrard Doum; Davy Atsa; Dobeneck Mbou; Feriol Itoua; Glenn Mopiti; Herbert Niambi; Jean Odzara; Nige Mbon; Nkelantima Ephrem; Roche Tchitembo; Taty Clauthère; Yannick Angao Coach: Grégoire Nganga
Women	Angola; Azenaide Carlos; Cristina Branco; Dalva Peres; Elizabeth Cailo; Elizabeth Viegas; Isabel Guialo; Janete Santos; Lurdes Monteiro; Marta Alberto; Marta Santos; Matilde André; Maura Galheta; Teresa Almeida; Teresa Leite; Vilma Nenganga; Wuta Dombaxe; Coach: João Florêncio	Cameroon; Albane Medibe; Anne Essam; Aubierge Nono; Berthe Abianbakon; Claudia Djong; Diane Yimga; Falone Yabon; Genny Fonguieng; Isabelle Mappai; Jacky Baniomo; Jules Sinkot; Léonie Makamgoum; Liliane Kamga; Isabelle Noëlle Mben Bediang; Pasma Nchouapougnigni Coach: Jean-Marie Zambo	Senegal; Hadja Cissé; Aida Diongue; Aissatou Dabo; Adja Paye; Alimatou Diadhiou; Alissa Gomis; Awa Diop; Doungou Camara; Haby Badiane; Hatadou Sako; Khoudiedji Ba; Marianne Faye; Ndeye Gueye; Niakalin Kante; Nimatigna Keita; Amina Sankharé; Penda Sylla; Coach: Cheick Seck

=== Medal table ===
Rank	Nation	Gold	Silver	Bronze	Total
1	Angola (ANG)	1	1	0	2
2	Egypt (EGY)	1	0	0	1
3	Cameroon (CMR)	0	1	0	1
4	Republic of the Congo (CGO)	0	0	1	1
4	Senegal (SEN)	0	0	1	1
Totals (5 entries)		2	2	2	6
