= Angola at the 2020 Summer Olympics =

- IOC code: ANG
- NOC: Angolan Olympic Committee
- Website: www.comiteolimpicoangolano.com

in Tokyo, Japan 23 July 2021 – 8 August 2021
- Competitors: 20 (4 men and 16 women) in 5 sports
- Flag bearers (opening): Natália Santos; Matias Montinho
- Flag bearer (closing): N/A
- Medals: Gold 0 Silver 0 Bronze 0 Total 0

Summer Olympics appearances (overview)
- 1980; 1984; 1988; 1992; 1996; 2000; 2004; 2008; 2012; 2016; 2020; 2024

Angola competed at the 2020 Summer Olympics in Tokyo. Originally scheduled to take place from 24 July to 9 August 2020, the Games were postponed to 23 July to 8 August 2021, because of the COVID-19 pandemic. It was the nation's tenth appearance at the Summer Olympics, having appeared in every Games since 1980 with the exception of the 1984 Summer Olympics in Los Angeles, when it was part of the Soviet boycott.

== Competitors ==
The following is the list of number of competitors in the Games and selected biographies. Note that reserves in handball are not counted:

Sport	Men	Women	Total
Athletics	1	0	1
Handball	0	14	14
Judo	0	1	1
Sailing	2	0	2
Swimming	1	1	2
Total	4	16	20

== Athletics ==
Angola received a universality slot from the World Athletics to send a male athlete to the Olympics.

Key

- Note–Ranks given for track events are within the athlete's heat only
- Q = Qualified for the next round
- q = Qualified for the next round as a fastest loser or, in field events, by position without achieving the qualifying target
- NR = National record
- N/A = Round not applicable for the event
- Bye = Athlete not required to compete in round

Track & road events

Athlete	Event	Heat		Quarterfinal		Semifinal		Final	
Athlete	Event	Result	Rank	Result	Rank	Result	Rank	Result	Rank
Aveni Miguel	Men's 100 m	DSQ		Did not advance					

== Handball ==
Summary

Key:

- ET: After extra time
- P – Match decided by penalty-shootout.

Team	Event	Group Stage						Quarterfinal	Semifinal	Final / BM	
Team	Event	Opposition Score	Opposition Score	Opposition Score	Opposition Score	Opposition Score	Rank	Opposition Score	Opposition Score	Opposition Score	Rank
Angola women's	Women's tournament	Montenegro; L 22–33	Norway; L 21–30	Netherlands; L 37–28	Japan; W 28–25	South Korea; D 31–31	5	Did not advance			

=== Women's tournament ===
Angola women's handball team qualified for the Olympics by winning the gold medal at the 2019 African Qualification Tournament in Dakar, Senegal.

Team roster

The squad was announced on 9 July 2021.

Head coach: Filipe Cruz

No.	Pos.	Name	Date of birth (age)	Height	App.	Goals	Club
5	LW	Marilia Quizelete	3 June 1997 (aged 24)	1.68 m	5	7	(Angola) Petro de Luanda
8	CB	Helena Paulo	24 January 1998 (aged 23)	1.77 m	34	159	(Angola) Primeiro de Agosto
9	CB	Natália Bernardo	25 December 1986 (aged 34)	1.70 m	118	214	(Angola) Primeiro de Agosto
10	P	Albertina Kassoma	12 June 1996 (aged 25)	1.94 m	76	181	(Romania) Rapid București
12	GK	Helena Sousa	7 November 1994 (aged 26)	1.90 m	38	1	(France) Saint-Amand Handball
13	RW	Natália Kamalandua	25 December 1998 (aged 22)	1.63 m	5	6	(Angola) Petro de Luanda
15	RB	Azenaide Carlos	14 June 1990 (aged 31)	1.71 m	91	112	(Croatia) RK Podravka Koprivnica
16	GK	Teresa Almeida	5 April 1988 (aged 33)	1.84 m	104	0	(Angola) Petro de Luanda
17	RB	Wuta Dombaxe	5 April 1986 (aged 35)	1.81 m	79	62	(Angola) Primeiro de Agosto
20	LB	Stélvia Pascoal	20 October 2002 (aged 18)	1.76 m	5	2	(Angola) Petro de Luanda
21	LB	Magda Cazanga	28 May 1991 (aged 30)	1.77 m	49	84	(Angola) Petro de Luanda
23	RW	Juliana Machado	6 November 1994 (aged 26)	1.70 m	62	1115	(Angola) Primeiro de Agosto
25	P	Liliana Venâncio	19 September 1995 (aged 25)	1.91 m	37	44	(Angola) Primeiro de Agosto
90	CB	Isabel Guialo	8 April 1990 (aged 31)	1.80 m	79	235	(France) Fleury Loiret HB

Group play

Pos	Team	Pld	W	D	L	GF	GA	GD	Pts	Qualification
1	Norway	5	5	0	0	170	123	+47	10	Quarter-finals
2	Netherlands	5	4	0	1	169	143	+26	8	Quarter-finals
3	Montenegro	5	2	0	3	139	142	−3	4	Quarter-finals
4	South Korea	5	1	1	3	147	165	−18	3 (Note: South Korea 31–31 Angola)	Quarter-finals
5	Angola	5	1	1	3	130	156	−26	3	
6	Japan (H)	5	1	0	4	124	150	−26	2	

Source: Tokyo 2020 and IHF
Rules for classification: 1) Points; 2) Head-to-head points; 3) Head-to-head goal difference; 4) Head-to-head goals scored; 5) Goal difference; 6) Goals scored; 7) Draw.
(H) Hosts
Notes:

25 July 2021; 14:15	Montenegro	33–22	Angola	Yoyogi National Gymnasium, Tokyo; Referees: Alpaidze, Berezkina (RUS)
25 July 2021; 14:15	Radičević 12	(13–12)	Kamalandua 6	Yoyogi National Gymnasium, Tokyo; Referees: Alpaidze, Berezkina (RUS)
25 July 2021; 14:15	2× (yellow card) 3× (suspension)	Report	5× (suspension)	Yoyogi National Gymnasium, Tokyo; Referees: Alpaidze, Berezkina (RUS)

27 July 2021; 19:30	Angola	21–30	Norway	Yoyogi National Gymnasium, Tokyo; Referees: García, Paolantoni (ARG)
27 July 2021; 19:30	Guialo, Kassoma 6	(10–15)	Solberg-Isaksen 7	Yoyogi National Gymnasium, Tokyo; Referees: García, Paolantoni (ARG)
27 July 2021; 19:30	4× (suspension)	Report	2× (yellow card) 3× (suspension)	Yoyogi National Gymnasium, Tokyo; Referees: García, Paolantoni (ARG)

29 July 2021; 09:00	Netherlands	37–28	Angola	Yoyogi National Gymnasium, Tokyo; Referees: El-Saied, El-Saied (EGY)
29 July 2021; 09:00	Van Wetering 7	(17–15)	Guialo 8	Yoyogi National Gymnasium, Tokyo; Referees: El-Saied, El-Saied (EGY)
29 July 2021; 09:00	1× (yellow card) 1× (suspension) 1× (red card)	Report	5× (suspension)	Yoyogi National Gymnasium, Tokyo; Referees: El-Saied, El-Saied (EGY)

31 July 2021; 09:00	Angola	28–25	Japan	Yoyogi National Gymnasium, Tokyo; Referees: García, Paolantoni (ARG)
31 July 2021; 09:00	three players 5	(15–13)	Hara 6	Yoyogi National Gymnasium, Tokyo; Referees: García, Paolantoni (ARG)
31 July 2021; 09:00	1× (yellow card) 2× (suspension)	Report	1× (yellow card) 1× (suspension)	Yoyogi National Gymnasium, Tokyo; Referees: García, Paolantoni (ARG)

2 August 2021; 09:00	South Korea	31–31	Angola	Yoyogi National Gymnasium, Tokyo; Referees: Bonaventura, Bonaventura (FRA)
2 August 2021; 09:00	Jung, Kang E. 7	(16–17)	Guialo 8	Yoyogi National Gymnasium, Tokyo; Referees: Bonaventura, Bonaventura (FRA)
2 August 2021; 09:00		Report	7× (suspension)	Yoyogi National Gymnasium, Tokyo; Referees: Bonaventura, Bonaventura (FRA)

== Judo ==
Angola qualified one judoka for the women's lightweight category (57 kg) at the Games. Diassonema Mucungui accepted a continental berth from Africa as the nation's top-ranked judoka outside of direct qualifying position in the IJF World Ranking List of 28 June 2021.

Athlete	Event	Round of 32	Round of 16	Quarterfinals	Semifinals	Repechage	Final / BM	
Athlete	Event	Opposition Result	Opposition Result	Opposition Result	Opposition Result	Opposition Result	Opposition Result	Rank
Diassonema Mucungui	Women's −57 kg	Liparteliani (GEO); L 000–100	Did not advance					

== Sailing ==
Angolan sailors qualified a boat in each of the following classes through the class-associated World Championships and the continental regattas.

Athlete	Event	Race											Net points	Final rank
Athlete	Event	1	2	3	4	5	6	7	8	9	10	M*	Net points	Final rank
Paixão Afonso; Matias Montinho	Men's 470	~~DNF~~	18	19	19	19	18	18	19	19	19	EL	167	19

M = Medal race; EL = Eliminated – did not advance into the medal race

== Swimming ==
Angola received a universality invitation from FINA to send two top-ranked swimmers (one per gender) in their respective individual events to the Olympics, based on the FINA Points System of 28 June 2021.

Athlete	Event	Heat		Semifinal		Final	
Athlete	Event	Time	Rank	Time	Rank	Time	Rank
Salvador Gordo	Men's 100 m butterfly	55.96	54	Did not advance			
Catarina Sousa	Women's 100 m freestyle	59.35	47	Did not advance			
