= Angola at the 2024 Summer Olympics =

- IOC code: ANG
- NOC: Angolan Olympic Committee
- Website: www.comiteolimpicoangolano.com

in Paris, France 26 July 2024 – 11 August 2024
- Competitors: 24 (8 men and 16 women) in 7 sports
- Flag bearers (opening): Edmilson Pedro & Azenaide Carlos
- Flag bearer (closing): Edmilson Pedro
- Medals: Gold 0 Silver 0 Bronze 0 Total 0

Summer Olympics appearances (overview)
- 1980; 1984; 1988; 1992; 1996; 2000; 2004; 2008; 2012; 2016; 2020; 2024

Angola competed at the 2024 Summer Olympics in Paris from 26 July to 11 August 2024. It was the nation's eleventh appearance at the Summer Olympics, since the nation's official debut in 1980, except for 1984, due to USSR led boycott.

== Background ==
=== Averted WADA sanction ===
In February 2024, the delegation was put at risk of facing a ban on using the Angolan flag at the Games after the World Anti-Doping Agency (WADA) tagged the Angolan Olympic Committee for non-compliance with doping regulations. The issue would be resolved by July 5, 2024, 3 weeks before the start of the Olympics, when the WADA cleared Angola.

== Competitors ==
The following is the list of number of competitors in the Games.

Sport	Men	Women	Total
Athletics	1	0	1
Canoeing	2	0	2
Handball	0	14	14
Judo	1	0	1
Rowing	1	0	1
Sailing	2	1	3
Swimming	1	1	2
Total	8	16	24

== Athletics ==
Angola sent one sprinter to compete at the 2024 Summer Olympics.

Key

- Note–Ranks given for track events are within the athlete's heat only
- Q = Qualified for the next round
- q = Qualified for the next round as a fastest loser or, in field events, by position without achieving the qualifying target
- NR = National record
- N/A = Round not applicable for the event
- Bye = Athlete not required to compete in round

Track and road events

Athlete	Event	Preliminary		Heat		Repechage		Semifinal		Final	
Athlete	Event	Time	Rank	Time	Rank	Time	Rank	Time	Rank	Time	Rank
Marcos Santos	Men's 100 m	10.31 NR	2 Q	10.40	7	—		Did not advance			

== Canoeing ==
=== Sprint ===
For the first time since 2012, Angola male canoeists qualified one boat for the Games through the gold medal result in the C-2 500 metres event at the 2023 African Olympic Qualifiers in Abuja, Nigeria.

Athlete	Event	Heats		Quarterfinals		Semifinals		Final	
Athlete	Event	Time	Rank	Time	Rank	Time	Rank	Time	Rank
Benilson Sanda	Men's C-1 1000 m	4:11.40	5	4:12.73	5	Did not advance			
Manuel António; Benilson Sanda	Men's C-2 500 m	1:51.53	6	1:49.00	4 FB	Bye		1:55.74	12

Qualification Legend: FA = Qualify to final (medal); FB = Qualify to final B (non-medal)

== Handball ==
Summary

Key:

- ET: After extra time
- P – Match decided by penalty-shootout.

Team	Event	Group Stage						Quarterfinal	Semifinal	Final / BM	
Team	Event	Opposition Score	Opposition Score	Opposition Score	Opposition Score	Opposition Score	Rank	Opposition Score	Opposition Score	Opposition Score	Rank
Angola women's	Women's tournament	Netherlands; L 31–34	Spain; W 26–21	Hungary; D 31–31	France; L 24–38	Brazil; L 19–30	5	Did not advance			9

=== Women's tournament ===
Angola women's national handball team qualified for the Olympics, after winning the gold medal, and securing an outright berth at the 2023 African Qualification Tournament in Luanda, Angola.

Team roster

An 18-player squad was announced on 17 June 2024. It was reduced to 15 players on 7 July 2024.

Head coach: (Spain) Carlos Viver

No.	Pos.	Name	Date of birth (age)	Height	App.	Goals	Club
1	GK	Marta Alberto	10 February 1995 (aged 29)	1.82 m	22	1	(Angola) Petro de Luanda
2	LB	Vilma Nenganga	12 September 1996 (aged 27)	1.77 m	14	22	(Angola) Petro de Luanda
5	P	Liliane Mario	16 November 2004 (aged 19)	1.77 m	20	57	(Angola) Primeiro de Agosto
6	RB	Juliana Machado	6 November 1994 (aged 29)	1.72 m	74	137	(Angola) Primeiro de Agosto
7	RW	Dolores Rosário	1 April 2003 (aged 21)	1.76 m	20	32	(Angola) Primeiro de Agosto
8	CB	Helena Paulo	24 January 1998 (aged 26)	1.73 m	48	184	(Romania) Târgu Jiu
9	LW	Natália Santos	25 December 1986 (aged 37)	1.73 m	289	230	(Angola) Primeiro de Agosto
10	P	Albertina Kassoma	12 June 1996 (aged 28)	1.85 m	86	243	(Romania) Rapid București
11	LW	Marília Quizelete	3 June 1997 (aged 27)	1.73 m	23	45	(Angola) Petro de Luanda
13	RW	Natália Kamalandua Fonseca	25 December 1998 (aged 25)	1.64 m	30	85	(Romania) CSM Corona Brașov
18	CB	Chelcia Gabriel	24 September 2000 (aged 23)	1.70 m	11	25	(Angola) Petro de Luanda
20	LB	Stelvia Pascoal	20 October 2002 (aged 21)	1.72 m	29	32	(France) Saint-Amand Handball
30	GK	Eliane Paulo	9 March 1999 (aged 25)	1.81 m	7	0	(Romania) Târgu Jiu
35	RB	Azenaide Carlos	14 June 1990 (aged 34)	1.73 m	96	116	(Romania) CSM Corona Brașov

Group play

Pos	Team	Pld	W	D	L	GF	GA	GD	Pts	Qualification
1	France (H)	5	5	0	0	159	124	+35	10	Quarterfinals
2	Netherlands	5	4	0	1	152	137	+15	8	Quarterfinals
3	Hungary	5	2	1	2	137	140	−3	5	Quarterfinals
4	Brazil	5	2	0	3	127	119	+8	4	Quarterfinals
5	Angola	5	1	1	3	131	154	−23	3	
6	Spain	5	0	0	5	111	143	−32	0	

Source: Olympics Paris 2024 rankings
Rules for classification: 1) Points; 2) Head-to-head points; 3) Head-to-head goal difference; 4) Head-to-head goals scored; 5) Goal difference; 6) Goals scored; 7) Draw.
(H) Hosts

25 July 2024; 11:00	Netherlands	34–31	Angola	Paris Expo Porte de Versailles, Paris; Attendance: 5,686; Referees: Kuttler, Merz (GER)
25 July 2024; 11:00	Malestein, Polman 8	(19–18)	Nenganga, H. Paulo 6	Paris Expo Porte de Versailles, Paris; Attendance: 5,686; Referees: Kuttler, Merz (GER)
25 July 2024; 11:00	1× (yellow card) 1× (suspension)	Report	3× (suspension)	Paris Expo Porte de Versailles, Paris; Attendance: 5,686; Referees: Kuttler, Merz (GER)

28 July 2024; 19:00	Angola	26–21	Spain	Paris Expo Porte de Versailles, Paris; Attendance: 5,748; Referees: A. Konjičanin, D. Konjičanin (BIH)
28 July 2024; 19:00	Nenganga 7	(14–15)	Campos 6	Paris Expo Porte de Versailles, Paris; Attendance: 5,748; Referees: A. Konjičanin, D. Konjičanin (BIH)
28 July 2024; 19:00	4× (suspension) 1× (red card)	Report	3× (suspension) 1× (red card)	Paris Expo Porte de Versailles, Paris; Attendance: 5,748; Referees: A. Konjičanin, D. Konjičanin (BIH)

30 July 2024; 16:00	Hungary	31–31	Angola	Paris Expo Porte de Versailles, Paris; Attendance: 5,834; Referees: Kurtagic, Wetterwik (SWE)
30 July 2024; 16:00	Klujber 9	(15–16)	Kassoma 9	Paris Expo Porte de Versailles, Paris; Attendance: 5,834; Referees: Kurtagic, Wetterwik (SWE)
30 July 2024; 16:00	1× (yellow card) 2× (suspension)	Report	2× (suspension)	Paris Expo Porte de Versailles, Paris; Attendance: 5,834; Referees: Kurtagic, Wetterwik (SWE)

1 August 2024; 16:00	Angola	24–38	France	Paris Expo Porte de Versailles, Paris; Attendance: 5,816; Referees: Jørum, Kleven (NOR)
1 August 2024; 16:00	three players 5	(14–18)	Kanor 7	Paris Expo Porte de Versailles, Paris; Attendance: 5,816; Referees: Jørum, Kleven (NOR)
1 August 2024; 16:00	2× (suspension) 1× (red card)	Report	1× (suspension)	Paris Expo Porte de Versailles, Paris; Attendance: 5,816; Referees: Jørum, Kleven (NOR)

3 August 2024; 14:00	Brazil	30–19	Angola	Paris Expo Porte de Versailles, Paris; Attendance: 5,801; Referees: Lah, Sok (SLO)
3 August 2024; 14:00	Bitolo 7	(14–6)	Pascoal 4	Paris Expo Porte de Versailles, Paris; Attendance: 5,801; Referees: Lah, Sok (SLO)
3 August 2024; 14:00	1× (yellow card) 2× (suspension)	Report	2× (yellow card) 1× (suspension)	Paris Expo Porte de Versailles, Paris; Attendance: 5,801; Referees: Lah, Sok (SLO)

== Judo ==
Angola qualified one judoka for the following weight class at the Games. Edmilson Pedro (men's half-lightweight, 66 kg) got qualified via continental quota based on Olympic point rankings.

Athlete	Event	Round of 64	Round of 32	Round of 16	Quarterfinals	Semifinals	Repechage	Final / BM	
Athlete	Event	Opposition Result	Opposition Result	Opposition Result	Opposition Result	Opposition Result	Opposition Result	Opposition Result	Rank
Edmilson Pedro	Men's –66 kg	—	Rahimov (TKM); L 01–10	Did not advance					

== Rowing ==
For the first time since 2016, Angolan rowers qualified one boat in the men's single sculls for the Games through the 2023 African Qualification Regatta in Tunis, Tunisia.

Athlete	Event	Heats		Repechage		Quarterfinals		Semifinals		Final	
Athlete	Event	Time	Rank	Time	Rank	Time	Rank	Time	Rank	Time	Rank
André Matias	Men's single sculls	7:52.78	6 R	8:01.98	5 SE/F	Did not advance		8:01.63	4 FF	7:30.43	32

Qualification Legend: FA=Final A (medal); FB=Final B (non-medal); FC=Final C (non-medal); FD=Final D (non-medal); FE=Final E (non-medal); FF=Final F (non-medal); SA/B=Semifinals A/B; SC/D=Semifinals C/D; SE/F=Semifinals E/F; QF=Quarterfinals; R=Repechage

== Sailing ==
Angolan sailors qualified one boat in the following classes through the 2023 African Regatta in Soma Bay, Egypt; and 2024 470 World Championships in Palma de Mallorca, Spain.

Medal race events

Athlete	Event	Race													Net points	Final rank
Athlete	Event	1	2	3	4	5	6	7	8	9	10	11	12	M*	Net points	Final rank
Filipe André	Men's ILCA 7	41	~~42~~	23	12	40	40	30	41	Cancelled		—		EL	227	39
Matias Montinho; Manuela Paulo	Mixed 470	16	18	~~20~~	20	19	18	17	18	Cancelled		—		EL	126	19

M = Medal race; EL = Eliminated – did not advance into the medal race

== Swimming ==
Angola sent two swimmers to compete at the 2024 Paris Olympics, through the allocation of universality places.

Athlete	Event	Heat		Semifinal		Final	
Athlete	Event	Time	Rank	Time	Rank	Time	Rank
Henrique Mascarenhas	Men's 100 m freestyle	52.52	64	Did not advance			
Lia Lima	Women's 200 m butterfly	2:22.19	19	Did not advance			
