= Handball at the 2015 African Games – Women's tournament =

Handball at the 2015 African Games Women's tournament
Tournament details
- Host country: Congo
- Venue: 1 Palais des Sports (Kintélé) (in 1 Brazzaville host cities)
- Dates: 10–19 September 2015
- Teams: 11 (from 1 confederation)

Final positions
- Champions: Angola (6th title)
- Runners-up: Cameroon
- Third place: Senegal
- Fourth place: Nigeria

Tournament statistics
- Matches played: 16

The 2015 edition of the Women's Handball Tournament of the African Games was the 9th, organized by the African Handball Confederation and played under the auspices of the International Handball Federation, the handball sport governing body. The tournament was held from 10 to 19 September 2015 at the Palais des Sports Kintélé in Brazzaville, Republic of Congo, contested by 11 national teams and won by Angola.

== Format ==
- The 11 teams were divided into four groups (Groups A+B+C+D) for the preliminary round.
- Round robin for the preliminary round; the top two teams of each group advanced to the quarterfinals.
- From there on a knockout system was used until the final.

== Draw ==
Group A	Group B	Group C	Group D
Cameroon; Mali; Senegal	Burkina Faso; Congo	Angola; Kenya; Nigeria	DR Congo; Ivory Coast; Zambia

== Group stage ==
Times given below are in UTC+1.

=== Group A ===
Team	Pld	W	D	L	GF	GA	GD	Pts
Cameroon	2	1	1	0	52	32	+20	3
Senegal	2	1	1	0	46	30	+16	3
Mali	2	0	0	2	24	60	−36	0

10 September 2015; 12:00	Cameroon	33–13	Mali	Palais des Sports (Kintélé), Brazzaville; Referees: Yawo Akpatsa, Agbeko Assignon (TOG)
10 September 2015; 12:00	Djong 9	(13–08)	Nomoko 4	Palais des Sports (Kintélé), Brazzaville; Referees: Yawo Akpatsa, Agbeko Assignon (TOG)
10 September 2015; 12:00	2× (yellow card) 5× (suspension)	Report	2× (yellow card) 2× (suspension)	Palais des Sports (Kintélé), Brazzaville; Referees: Yawo Akpatsa, Agbeko Assignon (TOG)

12 September 2015; 18:00	Senegal	27–11	Mali	Palais des Sports (Kintélé), Brazzaville; Referees: Jonas Allade, Arsène Datondji (BEN)
12 September 2015; 18:00	Keita 9	(14–05)	Doucoure 4	Palais des Sports (Kintélé), Brazzaville; Referees: Jonas Allade, Arsène Datondji (BEN)
12 September 2015; 18:00	3× (yellow card) 3× (suspension)	Report	1× (yellow card) 1× (suspension)	Palais des Sports (Kintélé), Brazzaville; Referees: Jonas Allade, Arsène Datondji (BEN)

14 September 2015; 16:00	Senegal	19–19	Cameroon	Palais des Sports (Kintélé), Brazzaville; Referees: Yawo Akpatsa, Agbeko Assignon (TOG)
14 September 2015; 16:00	Sankhare 6	(06–12)	Djong 6	Palais des Sports (Kintélé), Brazzaville; Referees: Yawo Akpatsa, Agbeko Assignon (TOG)
14 September 2015; 16:00	3× (yellow card) 3× (suspension)	Report	2× (yellow card) 9× (suspension)	Palais des Sports (Kintélé), Brazzaville; Referees: Yawo Akpatsa, Agbeko Assignon (TOG)

=== Group B ===
Team	Pld	W	D	L	GF	GA	GD	Pts
Congo	2	2	0	0	79	41	+38	4
Burkina Faso	2	0	0	2	41	79	−38	0

10 September 2015; 18:00	Congo	40–23	Burkina Faso	Palais des Sports (Kintélé), Brazzaville; Referees: Jonas Allade, Arsène Datondji (BEN)
10 September 2015; 18:00	Mambou 10	(20–12)	Kiemde 8	Palais des Sports (Kintélé), Brazzaville; Referees: Jonas Allade, Arsène Datondji (BEN)
10 September 2015; 18:00	3× (yellow card) 10× (suspension)	Report	2× (yellow card) 3× (suspension)	Palais des Sports (Kintélé), Brazzaville; Referees: Jonas Allade, Arsène Datondji (BEN)

14 September 2015; 18:00	Burkina Faso	18–39	Congo	Palais des Sports (Kintélé), Brazzaville; Referees: Escurinho António, Pedro Pinto (ANG)
14 September 2015; 18:00	Palm, Kando 5	(11–20)	Divoko 7	Palais des Sports (Kintélé), Brazzaville; Referees: Escurinho António, Pedro Pinto (ANG)
14 September 2015; 18:00	2× (yellow card) 4× (suspension)	Report	3× (yellow card) 5× (suspension)	Palais des Sports (Kintélé), Brazzaville; Referees: Escurinho António, Pedro Pinto (ANG)

=== Group C ===
Team	Pld	W	D	L	GF	GA	GD	Pts
Angola	2	2	0	0	79	37	+42	4
Nigeria	2	1	0	1	57	53	+4	2
Kenya	2	0	0	2	28	74	−46	0

10 September 2015; 14:00	Angola	42–12	Kenya	Palais des Sports (Kintélé), Brazzaville; Referees: Heidy Elsaied, Yasmina Elsaied (EGY)
10 September 2015; 14:00	Dombaxe 4	(24–07)	Musambai 5	Palais des Sports (Kintélé), Brazzaville; Referees: Heidy Elsaied, Yasmina Elsaied (EGY)
10 September 2015; 14:00	2× (yellow card) 2× (suspension)	Report	1× (yellow card) 6× (suspension)	Palais des Sports (Kintélé), Brazzaville; Referees: Heidy Elsaied, Yasmina Elsaied (EGY)

12 September 2015; 16:00	Nigeria	32–16	Kenya	Palais des Sports (Kintélé), Brazzaville; Referees: Felly Amba, Gisèle Tshilanda (COD)
12 September 2015; 16:00	Emeribe 13	(16–07)	Ambani 8	Palais des Sports (Kintélé), Brazzaville; Referees: Felly Amba, Gisèle Tshilanda (COD)
12 September 2015; 16:00	5× (yellow card) 3× (suspension)	Report	2× (yellow card) 6× (suspension)	Palais des Sports (Kintélé), Brazzaville; Referees: Felly Amba, Gisèle Tshilanda (COD)

14 September 2015; 12:00	Nigeria	25–37	Angola	Palais des Sports (Kintélé), Brazzaville; Referees: Felly Amba, Gisèle Tshilanda (COD)
14 September 2015; 12:00	Ohaekwe 6	(09–19)	Azenaide 7	Palais des Sports (Kintélé), Brazzaville; Referees: Felly Amba, Gisèle Tshilanda (COD)
14 September 2015; 12:00	5× (suspension)	Report	2× (yellow card) 3× (suspension)	Palais des Sports (Kintélé), Brazzaville; Referees: Felly Amba, Gisèle Tshilanda (COD)

=== Group D ===
Team	Pld	W	D	L	GF	GA	GD	Pts
Ivory Coast	2	2	0	0	78	39	+39	4
DR Congo	2	1	0	1	74	39	+35	2
Zambia	2	0	0	2	26	100	−74	0

10 September 2015; 16:00	DR Congo	51–10	Zambia	Palais des Sports (Kintélé), Brazzaville; Referees: Escurinho António, Pedro Pinto (ANG)
10 September 2015; 16:00	Kasong 5	(21–5)	Mbewe 4	Palais des Sports (Kintélé), Brazzaville; Referees: Escurinho António, Pedro Pinto (ANG)
10 September 2015; 16:00	3× (yellow card) 1× (suspension)	Report	2× (yellow card) 7× (suspension)	Palais des Sports (Kintélé), Brazzaville; Referees: Escurinho António, Pedro Pinto (ANG)

12 September 2015; 14:00	Ivory Coast	49–16	Zambia	Palais des Sports (Kintélé), Brazzaville; Referees: Heidy Elsaied, Yasmina Elsaied (EGY)
12 September 2015; 14:00	Traore 10	(21–04)	Mbewe 9	Palais des Sports (Kintélé), Brazzaville; Referees: Heidy Elsaied, Yasmina Elsaied (EGY)
12 September 2015; 14:00	2× (yellow card) 4× (suspension)	Report	1× (yellow card) 10× (suspension)	Palais des Sports (Kintélé), Brazzaville; Referees: Heidy Elsaied, Yasmina Elsaied (EGY)

14 September 2015; 14:00	Ivory Coast	29–23	DR Congo	Palais des Sports (Kintélé), Brazzaville; Referees: Sonia Beloum, Ida Zoehinga (BUR)
14 September 2015; 14:00	Traore, Brou 5	(12–11)	Mwasesa 10	Palais des Sports (Kintélé), Brazzaville; Referees: Sonia Beloum, Ida Zoehinga (BUR)
14 September 2015; 14:00	2× (yellow card) 4× (suspension)	Report	3× (yellow card) 1× (suspension)	Palais des Sports (Kintélé), Brazzaville; Referees: Sonia Beloum, Ida Zoehinga (BUR)

== Knockout stage ==
All matches were played in: Palais des Sports Kintélé, Brazzaville

Quarter-finals
16 September 2015
Cameroon *
Burkina Faso
16 September 2015
Congo	16
Senegal	24
16 September 2015
Angola	29
DR Congo	22
16 September 2015
Ivory Coast	20
Nigeria	25

Semi-finals
18 September 2015
Senegal	19
Cameroon	27
18 September 2015
Angola	32
Nigeria	10

Final
19 September 2015
Cameroon	29
Angola	33
Third place
19 September 2015
Senegal	25
Nigeria	24

* walkover win

=== Quarter-finals ===
16 September 2015; 12:00	DR Congo	22–29	Angola	Palais des Sports (Kintélé), Brazzaville; Referees: Yawo Akpatsa, Agbeko Assignon (TOG)
16 September 2015; 12:00	Mwasesa 11	(11–15)	Azenaide 8	Palais des Sports (Kintélé), Brazzaville; Referees: Yawo Akpatsa, Agbeko Assignon (TOG)
16 September 2015; 12:00	3× (yellow card) 2× (suspension)	Report	1× (yellow card) 3× (suspension)	Palais des Sports (Kintélé), Brazzaville; Referees: Yawo Akpatsa, Agbeko Assignon (TOG)

16 September 2015; 14:00	Cameroon	–	Burkina Faso	Palais des Sports (Kintélé), Brazzaville; Referees: Escurinho António, Pedro Pinto (ANG)
16 September 2015; 14:00		(–)		Palais des Sports (Kintélé), Brazzaville; Referees: Escurinho António, Pedro Pinto (ANG)
16 September 2015; 14:00		Report		Palais des Sports (Kintélé), Brazzaville; Referees: Escurinho António, Pedro Pinto (ANG)

16 September 2015 :00	Nigeria	25–20	Ivory Coast	Palais des Sports (Kintélé), Brazzaville; Referees: Felly Amba, Gisèle Tshilanda (COD)
16 September 2015 :00	Emeribe 12	(11–11)	Traore 5	Palais des Sports (Kintélé), Brazzaville; Referees: Felly Amba, Gisèle Tshilanda (COD)
16 September 2015 :00	3× (yellow card) 4× (suspension)	Report	2× (yellow card) 1× (suspension)	Palais des Sports (Kintélé), Brazzaville; Referees: Felly Amba, Gisèle Tshilanda (COD)

16 September 2015; 18:00	Congo	16–24	Senegal	Palais des Sports (Kintélé), Brazzaville; Referees: Yalatima Coulibaly, Mamoudou Diabate (CIV)
16 September 2015; 18:00	Mambou 6	(08–13)	Camara 9	Palais des Sports (Kintélé), Brazzaville; Referees: Yalatima Coulibaly, Mamoudou Diabate (CIV)
16 September 2015; 18:00	2× (yellow card)	Report	2× (yellow card) 4× (suspension)	Palais des Sports (Kintélé), Brazzaville; Referees: Yalatima Coulibaly, Mamoudou Diabate (CIV)

=== Semi-finals ===
18 September 2015; 12:00	Senegal	19–27	Cameroon	Palais des Sports (Kintélé), Brazzaville; Referees: Heidy Elsaied, Yasmina Elsaied (EGY)
18 September 2015; 12:00	Gomis 5	(8–12)	Djong 5	Palais des Sports (Kintélé), Brazzaville; Referees: Heidy Elsaied, Yasmina Elsaied (EGY)
18 September 2015; 12:00	3× (yellow card) 5× (suspension)	Report	1× (yellow card) 3× (suspension) 1× (red card)	Palais des Sports (Kintélé), Brazzaville; Referees: Heidy Elsaied, Yasmina Elsaied (EGY)

September 2015; 14:30	Angola	32–10	Nigeria	Palais des Sports (Kintélé), Brazzaville; Referees: Felly Amba, Gisèle Tshilanda (COD)
September 2015; 14:30	Vilma 9	(15–06)	Emeribe 3	Palais des Sports (Kintélé), Brazzaville; Referees: Felly Amba, Gisèle Tshilanda (COD)
September 2015; 14:30	4× (yellow card) 4× (suspension)	Report	2× (yellow card) 8× (suspension)	Palais des Sports (Kintélé), Brazzaville; Referees: Felly Amba, Gisèle Tshilanda (COD)

=== Bronze medal match ===
19 September 2015; 10:00	Senegal	25–24	Nigeria	Palais des Sports (Kintélé), Brazzaville
19 September 2015; 10:00	Cissé 11	(14–12)	Ohaekwe 8	Palais des Sports (Kintélé), Brazzaville
19 September 2015; 10:00	2× (yellow card) 5× (suspension)	Report	2× (yellow card) 7× (suspension)	Palais des Sports (Kintélé), Brazzaville

=== Gold medal match ===
19 September 2015
14:00
Cameroon
29–33 (ET)
Angola
Palais des Sports (Kintélé), Brazzaville
Referees: Sonia Beloum, Ida Zoehinga (BUR)
Essam 10
(14–14)
Viegas 8
3× (yellow card) 6× (suspension) 1× (red card)
Report
3× (yellow card) 3× (suspension)

FT: 28–28 ET: 29–33

== Final standings ==
Rank	Team	Record
Gold medal	Angola	5–0–0
Silver medal	Cameroon	3–1–1
Bronze medal	Senegal	3–1–1
4	Nigeria	2–0–3
5	Ivory Coast	2–0–1
6	Congo	2–0–1
7	DR Congo	1–0–2
8	Burkina Faso	0–0–3
9	Mali	0–0–2
10	Kenya	0–0–2
11	Zambia	0–0–2

2015 African Games Women's Handball winner

Angola
5th title
