= Hatadou Sako =

French-Senegalese handball player (born 1995)

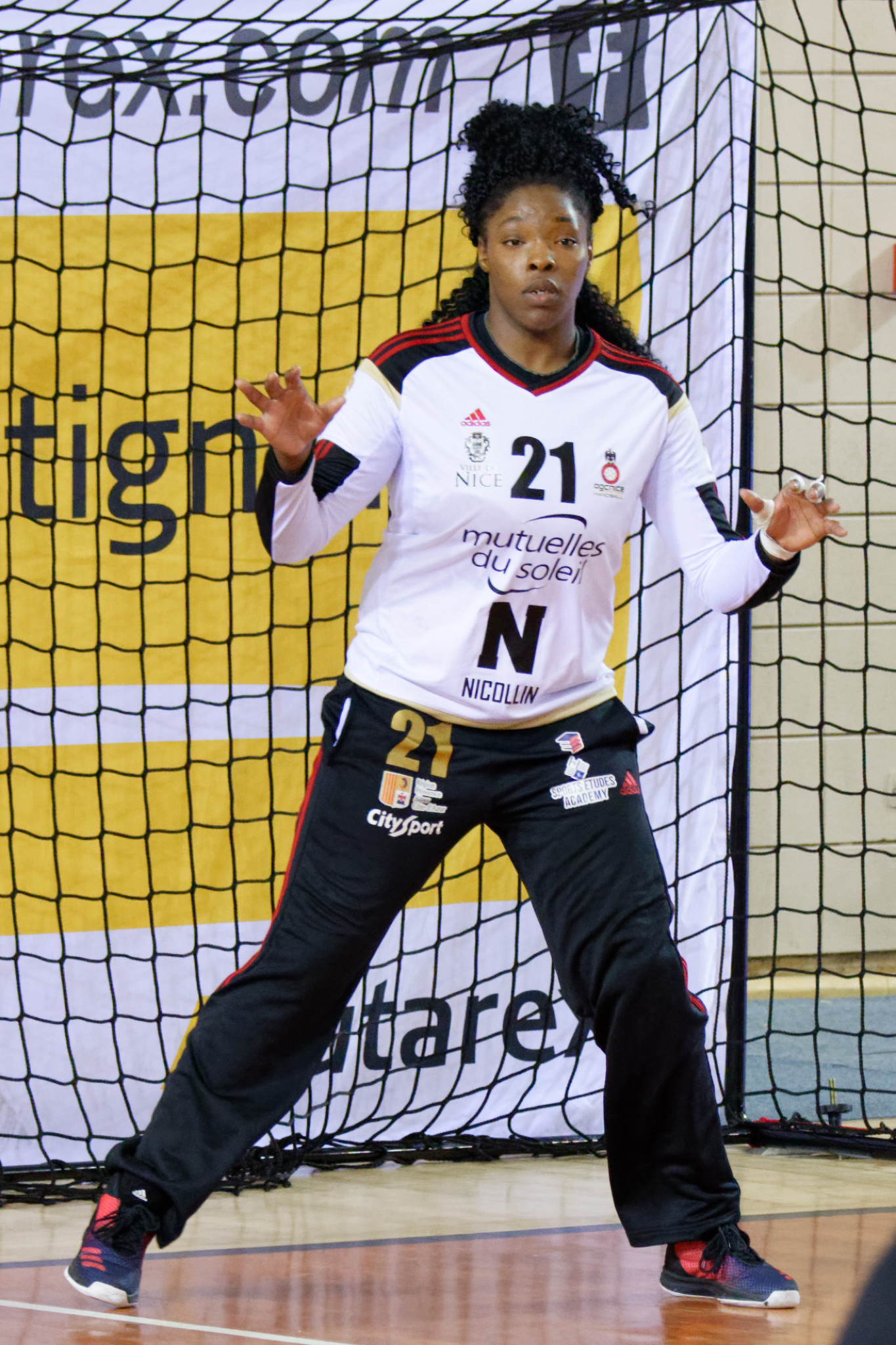
- Sako in 2017

Personal information
- Nationality: Senegalese; French
- Born: 21 October 1995 (age 31) Tournan-en-Brie, France
- Height: 1.72 m (5 ft 8 in)

Sport
- Sport: Handball
- Position: Goalkeeper
- Current club: Győri ETO KC
- Number: 99

Senior clubs
- Years: Team
- 2011–2016: Noisy Le Grand
- 2016–2020: OGC Nice
- 2020–2024: Metz Handball
- 2024–: Győri ETO KC
National team
Years	Team		
2015–2021	Senegal		
2023–	France	88	(0)
Medal record
Representing Senegal
African Games
Bronze medal – third place	2015 Republic of the Congo	Team
African Championship
Silver medal – second place	2018 Brazzaville
Representing France
Olympic Games
Silver medal – second place	2024 Paris	Team
World Championship
Gold medal – first place	2023 Denmark/Norway/Sweden
Bronze medal – third place	2025 Germany/Netherlands
- Updated on 3 January 2025

Hatadou Sako (born 21 October 1995) is a Senegalese/French female handball player for Győri ETO KC and the French national team. She has previously played for the Senegalese national team.

She is known for her wild gestures during matches, playing mind games with the opposition, and appealing to the crowd.

== Career ==
Sako started her career at Noisy-le-Grand handball. In 2016 she joined OGC Nice Côte d'Azur. In 2019 she was selected for the French League all-star team.

In 2020 she joined Metz Handball. Here she won the 2022, 2023 and 2024 French Championship and Cup. She also won bronze medals at the EHF Champions League 2021/22.

For the 2024-25 season she joined Hungarian Győri ETO KC to replace Silje Solberg-Østhassel. Here she won the 2025 Hungarian Championship and the EHF Champions League.

== National team ==
=== Senegal ===
Sako first played for the Senegalese national team. At the 2015 African Games she won bronze medals. At the 2016 African Women's Handball Championship Senegal reached the semifinals, but were disqualified from the tournament for using ineligible player Doungou Camara, since she has already played for the French national team. Tunisia faced Angola in the final and Cameroon automatically occupied the third place.

Sako won a silver medal at the 2018 African Championship.

She was part of the Senegalese team at the 2019 World Women's Handball Championship. Senegal finished 19th at the occasion.

=== France ===
In 2023 she switched alligiance to France.

Her first major international tournament for France was the 2023 World Women's Handball Championship where France won gold medals. She was however mostly second choice to Laura Glauser. At the 2024 Olympics she won silver medals.

For the 2025 World Championship she won bronze medals losing to Germany in the semifinal and beating Netherlands in extra time in the third place playoff. She was the French first choice in goal due to an injury to Laura Glauser.

== Personal life ==
Born in France, Sako is of Senegalese and Malian descent.

== Achievements ==
- EHF Champions League:
  - Winner: 2025
- Championnat de France:
  - Winner: 2022, 2023, 2024
- Coupe de France:
  - Winner: 2022, 2023, 2024
- Nemzeti Bajnokság I:
  - Winner: 2025

== Individual awards ==
- French Championship Best Goalkeeper: 2019
- 2018 African Women's Handball Championship Best Goalkeeper
