= Democratic Republic of the Congo at the African Games =

- IOC code: COD
- NOC: Comité Olympique Congolais
- Medals: Gold 4 Silver 8 Bronze 29 Total 41

African Games appearances (overview)
- 1965; 1973–1978; 1987; 1991; 1995; 1999; 2003; 2007; 2011; 2015; 2019; 2023

The Democratic Republic of the Congo has participated in every edition of the African Games since they were first established in 1965, and the nation appeared as Zaire during the games between 1971 and 1997. The only two gold medalists for the DRC since its name change in 1997 were the boxer Jesus Kibunde in 1999 and the tennis player Denis Indondo in 2015.

== Medal record ==
Games	Gold	Silver	Bronze	Total
1965	0	0	1	1
1973	0	0	0	0
1978	0	0	0	0
1987	1	1	0	2
1991	0	0	2	2
1995	0	0	0	0
1999	1	1	2	4
2003	0	1	1	2
2007	2	1	3	6
2011	0	0	1	1
2015	0	2	9	11
2019	0	2	10	12
Totals (12 entries)	4	8	29	41
