= Nzango =

Congolese dance game

Nzango (English: foot game) is a local traditional playground dancing game that has its origin from Congo Republic and DR Congo. Practiced and played mainly by women for fun, the sport is a mixture of dance, singing, gymnastics and choreography performed in an energetic way. The game was demonstrated at the 2015 All Africa Games held in Brazzaville, West Congo.

== Manner of play ==
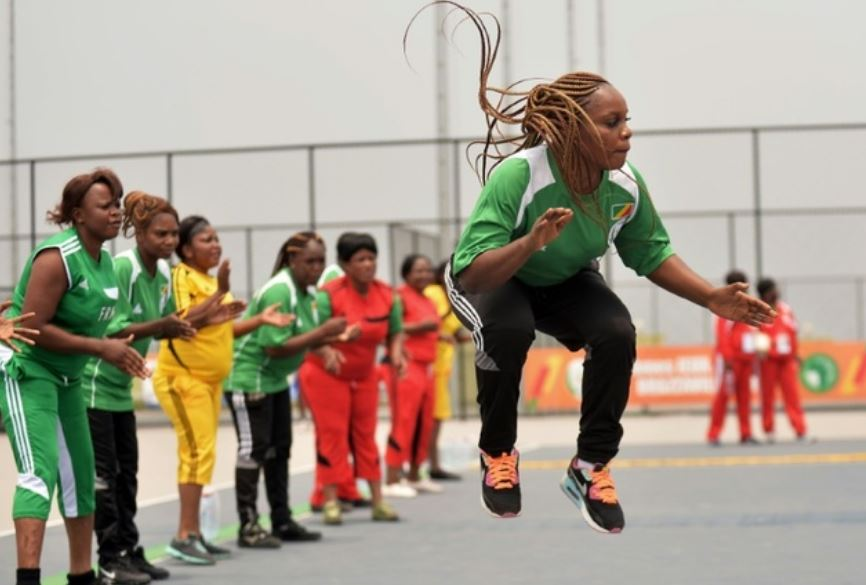
A cross-section of disabled women playing Nzango

Nzango is played by two opposing teams lined up and facing each other with individual members from each team taking turns in outplaying the other. It is played on a pitch measuring 8 metres by 16 metres, by teams of eleven players and six reserves who chant songs while clapping their hands.

The start of a Nzango match begins with both teams choosing either the right foot or left foot referred to as the “attack foot”. The aim of a player is to simultaneously move forward on their attack foot preceded by aas their opponent does. The referee award points (feet) to players who position their feet in relation to their opponents.
