= Democratic Republic of the Congo at the 2019 African Games =

- Flag of the Democratic Republic of the Congo
- IOC code: COD
- NOC: Comité Olympique Congolais

in Rabat, Morocco 19 August 2019 – 31 August 2019
- Competitors: 164 (104 men and 60 women) in 17 sports
- Medals Ranked 27th: Gold 0 Silver 2 Bronze 10 Total 12

African Games appearances (overview)
- 1965; 1973–1978; 1987; 1991; 1995; 1999; 2003; 2007; 2011; 2015; 2019; 2023

Democratic Republic of the Congo took part in the 2019 African Games held from 19 August to 31 August 2019 in Rabat, Morocco, with a total of 164 athletes competing in 17 sports, and won 12 medals (two silver medals and ten bronze medals). The country finished in 27th place in the medal table.

== Medal summary ==
=== Medal table ===
Medal	Name	Sport	Event	Date
Silver	Peter Pita Kabeji	Boxing	Men's –81 kg	29 August
Silver	Jeamie Tshikeva Kimbembi	Boxing	Men's +91 kg	29 August
Bronze	Prince Kosi Samuzu	Judo	Men's –100 kg	18 August
Bronze	Flore Mbubu	Taekwondo	Women's –46 kg	21 August
Bronze	Sungulia Alliance; Sephora Kayolo Mangenza; Luzenga Louange; Bula Bula Mariana	3x3 basketball	Women's 3x3	25 August
Bronze	Idriss Kapenga Nsaka	Boxing	Men's –69 kg	28 August
Bronze	Modestine Munga Zalia	Boxing	Women's –51 kg	28 August
Bronze	Naomie Yumba Therese	Boxing	Women's –60 kg	28 August
Bronze	Jeanne Fribault	Fencing	Women's sabre individual	28 August
Bronze	Aron Mbo Isomi	Wrestling	Men's Greco-Roman 97 kg	28 August
Bronze	Women's team	Handball	Women's tournament	29 August
Bronze	Aron Mbo Isomi	Wrestling	Men's freestyle 97 kg	30 August

Medals by sport
Sport	1st place, gold medalist(s)	2nd place, silver medalist(s)	3rd place, bronze medalist(s)	Total
Basketball	0	0	1	1
Boxing	0	2	3	5
Fencing	0	0	1	1
Handball	0	0	1	1
Judo	0	0	1	1
Taekwondo	0	0	1	1
Wrestling	0	0	2	2
Total	0	2	10	12

== Archery ==
Two athletes competed in archery.

Christ Kanza Diasonama competed in the men's individual event.

Ruth Yanfu Museta competed in the women's individual event.

They both also competed in the mixed team event.

== Athletics ==
In total eight athletes competed in athletics.

== Badminton ==
Six athletes were scheduled to compete in badminton.

== Boxing ==
Democratic Republic of the Congo competed in boxing.

== Cycling ==
The Democratic Republic of the Congo had six athletes who competed in cycling.

== Fencing ==
Jeanne Frebault won one of the bronze medals in the women's sabre event.

== Handball ==
The Democratic Republic of the Congo competed in both the men's tournament and women's tournament. The women's team won the bronze medal in their tournament and the men's team was eliminated in the men's quarter finals by Morocco.

== Judo ==
Eleven athletes competed in judo: Sarah Kafufula Bilengo, Corneille Boendo Mpak'Eangonda, Monica Bwanga Misenga, Dieu Ikoma Bokinda, Carole Imongo Kimberly, Prince Kosi Samuzu, Benny Mantota Mpaka and Bin Marco Mawesi.

Prince Kosi Samuzu won one of the bronze medals in the men's 100 kg event.

== Karate ==
Democratic Republic of the Congo competed in karate.

== Swimming ==
Three swimmers represented in the country in the sport.

Athlete	Event	Heat		Final	
Athlete	Event	Time	Rank	Time	Rank
Yves Munyu Kupiata	Men's 50 metre freestyle	31.45	?	—N/a	
Jonathan Sokimayi Mubikayi	Men's 50 metre freestyle	DSQ		—N/a	
Fabrice Mopama Sukasuka	Men's 100 metre breaststroke	DNS		—N/a	

== Table tennis ==
Ten athletes were scheduled to compete in table tennis.

== Taekwondo ==
Thirteen athletes are scheduled to compete in Taekwondo. Flore Mbubu won the bronze medal in the Women's -46 kg event.

== Tennis ==
Six athletes were scheduled to compete in tennis.

== Weightlifting ==
Four athletes were scheduled to compete in weightlifting.

== Wrestling ==
In total eleven athletes represented the country in wrestling. Aron Mbo Isomi won bronze medals in the Men's Greco-Roman 97 kg and Men's Freestyle 97kg events.
