= Léa Buet =

French-born Senegalese judoka

Personal information
- Nationality: French; Senegalese
- Born: 20 March 1989 (age 37) Léhon, France
- Occupation: Judoka

Sport
- Country: France (2005–2009); Senegal (2014–present)
- Sport: Judo
- Weight class: –57 kg

Achievements and titles
- World Champ.: R32 (2023)
- African Champ.: 5th (2017)
Medal record
Women's judo
Representing Senegal
African Games
Bronze medal – third place	2015 Brazzaville	–57 kg
African Championships
Silver medal – second place	2022 Oran	Mixed Team

Profile at external databases
- IJF: 23365
- JudoInside.com: 38393
- Updated on 8 May 2023

Léa Buet (born 20 March 1989) is a French-born Senegalese judoka who competed in the women's 57 kg class.

== Career ==
=== France ===
Buet started playing judo at a young age at Dinan. She played at the Anne-de-Bretagne college in Rennes, then for clubs at Poitiers and Bordeaux. She then joins the club of Sainte Geneviève Sports club in Paris and wins the bronze medal at the French junior championships in 2007 in 52 kg category.

=== Senegal ===
She stopped competing in France by 2009 and later emigrated to Senegal in 2012, eventually becoming a naturalized Senegalese citizen in 2015. She played her first competition under the Senegal at the 2015 African Judo Championships. She won the bronze medal in for the 57 kg category at the 2015 African Games at Brazzaville.

Post retirement after 2017, Buet founded the sports association Adjimé which promotes and organises MMA events in Senegal.
