= Fatima Bashir =

Nigerian judoka

Personal information
- Full name: Fatima Bashir
- Nationality: Nigeria
- Born: 8 January 1995 (age 31) Nigeria
- Occupation: Judoka

Sport
- Sport: Judo
- Event: 48 kg
Medal record
Women's judo
Representing Nigeria
All-Africa Games
Bronze medal – third place	2015 Brazzaville	48kg

Profile at external databases
- JudoInside.com: 100198

Fatima Bashir (born 8 January 1995) is a Nigerian judoka who competes in the women's category. She won a bronze medal in the 48 kg category at the 2015 All-Africa Games.

== Sports career ==
Fatima Bashir won a bronze medal in the women's 48 kg event at the 2015 All-Africa Games held in Brazzaville, Republic of the Congo.
