= Madagascar at the 2015 African Games =

- Flag of Madagascar
- IOC code: MAD
- NOC: Comité Olympique Malgache

African Games appearances
- 1965; 1973; 1978; 1987; 1991; 1995; 1999; 2003; 2007; 2011; 2015; 2019; 2023

Madagascar competed at the 2015 African Games held in Brazzaville, Republic of the Congo.

== Medal summary ==
=== Medal table ===
Medal	Name	Sport	Event	Date
Silver	Zarah Razafimahatratra	Tennis	Women's singles	
Bronze	Éric Andriantsitohaina	Weightlifting	Men's 56 kg	
Bronze	Tojonirina Andriantsitohaina	Weightlifting	Men's 62 kg	

== Tennis ==
Zarah Razafimahatratra won the silver medal in the women's singles event.

== Weightlifting ==
Madagascar won two medals in weightlifting.
