= Dalva Peres =

Angolan handball player

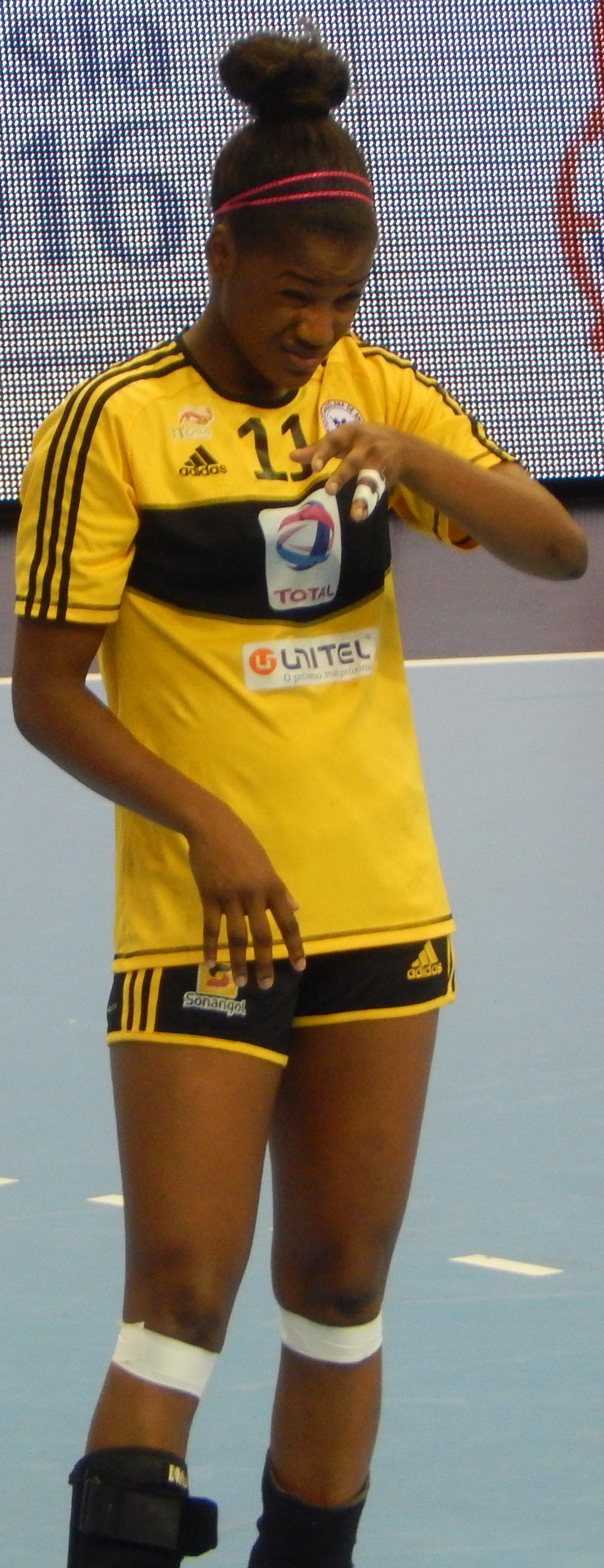

Personal information
- Full name: Dalva Judith Peres
- Nationality: Angolan
- Born: 6 August 1996 (age 30)
- Height: 1.75 m (5 ft 9 in)

Sport
- Sport: Handball
- Position: Centre back
- Current club: Primeiro de Agosto
National team
Years	Team	Apps	(Gls)
–	Angola	7	(5)
Medal record
African Handball Championship
Gold medal – first place	Luanda 2016
Gold medal – first place	2021 Yaoundé
African Games
Gold medal – first place	Brazzaville 2015	Team
African Junior Championship
Gold medal – first place	Nairobi 2015

Dalva Judith Peres (born 6 August 1996) is an Angolan handball player for Primeiro de Agosto.

Peres made its debut in the Angolan national team at the 2016 African Championship. As a youth player, she was a member of the Angolan youth team to the 2014 youth olympics.
