= Wrestling at the 2015 African Games =

- Location: Brazzaville, Republic of the Congo
- Dates: 15–18 September
- Competitors: 155 from 18 nations

Wrestling at the 2015 African Games in Brazzaville was held between September 15–18, 2015. Two Nigerian medallists were disqualified due to doping: 55 kg women's freestyle gold medallist Patience Opuene and 60 kg runner-up Ebi James.

== Medal table ==
* Host nation (Republic of the Congo)

Rank	Nation	Gold	Silver	Bronze	Total
1	Nigeria (NGR)	8	4	4	16
2	Egypt (EGY)	7	3	6	16
3	Algeria (ALG)	4	5	3	12
4	Tunisia (TUN)	2	3	5	10
5	Cameroon (CMR)	1	3	1	5
6	Senegal (SEN)	1	2	5	8
7	South Africa (RSA)	0	3	2	5
8	Democratic Republic of the Congo (COD)	0	0	5	5
9	Republic of the Congo (CGO)*	0	0	3	3
10	Chad (CHA)	0	0	2	2
10	Kenya (KEN)	0	0	2	2
12	Burkina Faso (BUR)	0	0	1	1
Totals (12 entries)		23	23	39	85

== Medal overview ==
=== Men's freestyle ===
Event	Gold	Silver	Bronze
57 kg	Adama Diatta; Senegal	Mathlouthi Chedli; Tunisia	Abdelhak Kherbache; Algeria
61 kg	Amas Daniel; Nigeria	Abderrahim Sayeh; Algeria	Gael Diata; Senegal
61 kg	Amas Daniel; Nigeria	Abderrahim Sayeh; Algeria	Gert Coetzee; South Africa
65 kg	Zouheir Iftene; Algeria	Haithem Mahmoud; Egypt	Sampson Clarkson; Nigeria
65 kg	Zouheir Iftene; Algeria	Haithem Mahmoud; Egypt	Ngeta Ibanda; Democratic Republic of the Congo
70 kg	Ibrahim Ayad; Egypt	Mohamed Ali Belayech; Tunisia	Mohamed Boudraa; Algeria
70 kg	Ibrahim Ayad; Egypt	Mohamed Ali Belayech; Tunisia	Ngoyi Poramba Dydo; Democratic Republic of the Congo
74 kg	Melvin Bibo; Nigeria	Hamza Moussaoui; Algeria	Blaise Debe; Burkina Faso
74 kg	Melvin Bibo; Nigeria	Hamza Moussaoui; Algeria	Abdou Omar; Egypt
86 kg	Mohamed Zaghloul; Egypt	Mohamed Saadaoui; Tunisia	Cheikh Niang; Senegal
86 kg	Mohamed Zaghloul; Egypt	Mohamed Saadaoui; Tunisia	Dick Adibo; Nigeria
97 kg	Soso Tamarau; Nigeria	Cedric Yvan Nyamsi; Cameroon	Ali Hamdy Amin; Egypt
97 kg	Soso Tamarau; Nigeria	Cedric Yvan Nyamsi; Cameroon	Basil Dieudonne; Chad
125 kg	Slim Trabelsi; Tunisia	Sinivie Boltic; Nigeria	Fod Sarr; Senegal
125 kg	Slim Trabelsi; Tunisia	Sinivie Boltic; Nigeria	Diaaeldin Kamal; Egypt

=== Men's Greco-Roman ===
Event	Gold	Silver	Bronze
59 kg	Abdennour Laouni; Algeria	Jan Combrinck; South Africa	Yala Maindombe Florentin; Democratic Republic of the Congo
66 kg	Tarek Benaissa; Algeria	Otutu Oke; Nigeria	Ndombasi Matadi Regan; Democratic Republic of the Congo
66 kg	Tarek Benaissa; Algeria	Otutu Oke; Nigeria	Haithem Mahmoud; Egypt
71 kg	Emmanuel Nworie; Nigeria	Ibrahim Mahmud Hamid; Egypt	Akrem Boudjemline; Algeria
75 kg	Ibrahim ad-Disuki; Egypt	Hichem Bourmel; Algeria	Mupompa Kais; Democratic Republic of the Congo
75 kg	Ibrahim ad-Disuki; Egypt	Hichem Bourmel; Algeria	Sammy Diego Nyongesa; Kenya
80 kg	Tarek Abdelslam; Egypt	Bachir Sid Azara; Algeria	Omyemedelubi Abraham; Nigeria
85 kg	Adem Boudjemline; Algeria	Mohamed Moustafa Ahmad; Egypt	Nathaniel Samuel; Nigeria
98 kg	Ahmed Othman; Egypt	Hamza Haloui; Algeria	Basil Dieudonne; Chad
98 kg	Ahmed Othman; Egypt	Hamza Haloui; Algeria	Kanga Gislain; Republic of the Congo
130 kg	Abdellatif Mohamed; Egypt	Andries Shutte; South Africa	Holln Mkanga Ochieng; Kenya
130 kg	Abdellatif Mohamed; Egypt	Andries Shutte; South Africa	Radhouane Chebbi; Tunisia

=== Women's freestyle ===
Event	Gold	Silver	Bronze
48 kg	Mercy Genesis; Nigeria	Rebecca Muambo; Cameroon	Maroi Mezien; Tunisia
53 kg	Odunayo Adekuoroye; Nigeria	Isabelle Sambou; Senegal	Parfaite Mambou; Republic of the Congo
55 kg	----	Jeanne-Marie Coetzer; South Africa	Bineta Diatta; Senegal
55 kg	----	Jeanne-Marie Coetzer; South Africa	Rim Ayari; Tunisia
58 kg	Aminat Adeniyi; Nigeria	Safiétou Goudiaby; Senegal	Marwa Amri; Tunisia
58 kg	Aminat Adeniyi; Nigeria	Safiétou Goudiaby; Senegal	Noelle Mbouma; Republic of the Congo
60 kg	Hela Riabi; Tunisia	----	Habiba Tarek Fathi; Egypt
63 kg	Blessing Oborududu; Nigeria	Berthe Etane Ngolle; Cameroon	Sirine issaoui Tunisia
63 kg	Blessing Oborududu; Nigeria	Berthe Etane Ngolle; Cameroon	Anta Sambou; Senegal
69 kg	Enas Mostafa; Egypt	Hannah Rueben; Nigeria	Blandine Metala; Cameroon
69 kg	Enas Mostafa; Egypt	Hannah Rueben; Nigeria	Zumicke Geringer; South Africa
75 kg	Annabelle Ali; Cameroon	Blessing Onyebuchi; Nigeria	Nadia Anter; Egypt
