= Handball at the 2023 African Games – Women's tournament =

Women's handball at the 2023 African Games

Tournament details
- Host country: Ghana
- Venue: 1 (in 1 host city)
- Dates: 14–22 March 2024
- Teams: 8 (from 1 confederation)

Final positions
- Champions: Angola (8th title)
- Runners-up: DR Congo
- Third place: Cameroon
- Fourth place: Algeria

Tournament statistics
- Matches played: 18
- Goals scored: 964 (53.56 per match)

The women's handball tournament at the 2023 African Games was held from 14 to 22 March 2024 at the Borteyman Sports Complex in Accra.

== Draw ==
The draw was held on 24 February 2024 at the Borteyman Sports Complex in Accra.

Pot 1	Pot 2	Pot 3	Pot 4
Angola; Cameroon	Algeria; DR Congo	Burkina Faso; Uganda	Mali; Ghana

== Group stage ==
All times are local (UTC±0).

=== Group A ===
Pos	Team	Pld	W	D	L	GF	GA	GD	Pts	Qualification
1	Angola	3	3	0	0	120	44	+76	6	Semifinals
2	Algeria	3	2	0	1	64	73	−9	4	Semifinals
3	Ghana (H)	3	1	0	2	49	78	−29	2	Fifth place game
4	Burkina Faso	3	0	0	3	55	93	−38	0	Seventh place game

Rules for classification: 1) Points; 2) Head-to-head points; 3) Head-to-head goal difference; 4) Head-to-head goals scored; 5) Goal difference; 6) Goals scored; 7) Draw.
(H) Hosts

14 March 2024; 12:00	Angola	47–13	Burkina Faso	Borteyman Sports Complex
14 March 2024; 12:00		(24–7)		Borteyman Sports Complex

14 March 2024; 16:00	Algeria	22–14	Ghana	Borteyman Sports Complex
14 March 2024; 16:00		(11–7)		Borteyman Sports Complex

16 March 2024; 12:00	Ghana	13–35	Angola	Borteyman Sports Complex
16 March 2024; 12:00		(5–14)		Borteyman Sports Complex

16 March 2024; 18:00	Burkina Faso	21–24	Algeria	Borteyman Sports Complex
16 March 2024; 18:00		(15–12)		Borteyman Sports Complex

18 March 2024; 14:00	Burkina Faso	21–22	Ghana	Borteyman Sports Complex
18 March 2024; 14:00		(7–6)		Borteyman Sports Complex

18 March 2024; 16:00	Angola	38–18	Algeria	Borteyman Sports Complex

=== Group B ===
Pos	Team	Pld	W	D	L	GF	GA	GD	Pts	Qualification
1	DR Congo	3	2	1	0	95	66	+29	5	Semifinals
2	Cameroon	3	2	0	1	104	65	+39	4	Semifinals
3	Uganda	3	1	1	1	96	97	−1	3	Fifth place game
4	Mali	3	0	0	3	50	117	−67	0	Seventh place game

Rules for classification: 1) Points; 2) Head-to-head points; 3) Head-to-head goal difference; 4) Head-to-head goals scored; 5) Goal difference; 6) Goals scored; 7) Draw.

14 March 2024; 14:00	Cameroon	38–27	Uganda	Borteyman Sports Complex
14 March 2024; 14:00		(17–12)		Borteyman Sports Complex

14 March 2024; 18:00	DR Congo	38–10	Mali	Borteyman Sports Complex
14 March 2024; 18:00		(20–6)		Borteyman Sports Complex

16 March 2024; 14:00	Mali	13–42	Cameroon	Borteyman Sports Complex
16 March 2024; 14:00		(4–29)		Borteyman Sports Complex

16 March 2024; 16:00	Uganda	32–32	DR Congo	Borteyman Sports Complex
16 March 2024; 16:00		(15–16)		Borteyman Sports Complex

18 March 2024; 12:00	Uganda	37–27	Mali	Borteyman Sports Complex
18 March 2024; 12:00		(20–10)		Borteyman Sports Complex

18 March 2024; 18:00	Cameroon	24–25	DR Congo	Borteyman Sports Complex

== Knockout stage ==
=== Bracket ===
Semifinals
20 March
Angola	35
Cameroon	16
20 March
DR Congo	29
Algeria	25

Final
22 March
Angola	33
DR Congo	15
Third place
22 March
Cameroon	29
Algeria	21

=== Semifinals ===
20 March 2024; 12:00	Angola	35–16	Cameroon	Borteyman Sports Complex
20 March 2024; 12:00		(16–11)		Borteyman Sports Complex

20 March 2024; 16:00	DR Congo	29–25	Algeria	Borteyman Sports Complex
20 March 2024; 16:00		(12–15)		Borteyman Sports Complex

=== Seventh place game ===
21 March 2024; 14:00	Burkina Faso	38–32	Mali	Borteyman Sports Complex
21 March 2024; 14:00		(16–12)		Borteyman Sports Complex

=== Fifth place game ===
21 March 2024; 18:00	Ghana	28–30	Uganda	Borteyman Sports Complex
21 March 2024; 18:00		(13–15)		Borteyman Sports Complex

=== Third place game ===
22 March 2024; 12:00	Cameroon	29–21	Algeria	Borteyman Sports Complex
22 March 2024; 12:00		(18–11)		Borteyman Sports Complex

=== Final ===
22 March 2024; 16:00	Angola	33–15	DR Congo	Borteyman Sports Complex
22 March 2024; 16:00		(15–7)		Borteyman Sports Complex

== Final standing ==
Rank	Team
1st place, gold medalist(s)	Angola
2nd place, silver medalist(s)	DR Congo
3rd place, bronze medalist(s)	Cameroon
4	Algeria
5	Uganda
6	Ghana
7	Burkina Faso
8	Mali
