= Burkina Faso at the 2015 African Games =

- Flag of Burkina Faso
- IOC code: BUR
- NOC: Burkinabé National Olympic and Sports Committee

African Games appearances
- 1965; 1973; 1978; 1987; 1991; 1995; 1999; 2003; 2007; 2011; 2015; 2019; 2023

Burkina Faso competed at the 2015 African Games held in Brazzaville, Republic of the Congo.

== Medal summary ==
=== Medal table ===
Medal	Name	Sport	Event	Date
Gold	Lætitia Bambara	Athletics	Women's hammer throw	
Silver	Men's team	Football	Men's tournament	
Bronze	Marthe Koala	Athletics	Women's heptathlon	
Bronze	Pon-Karidjatou Traoré	Athletics	Women's 100 metres	
Bronze	Blaise Debe	Wrestling	Men's freestyle 74 kg	

== Athletics ==
Burkina Faso won several medals in athletics.

Lætitia Bambara won the gold medal in the women's hammer throw event.

Marthe Koala won the bronze medal in the women's heptathlon and Pon-Karidjatou Traoré won one of the bronze medals in the women's 100 metres event.

== Football ==
Burkina Faso won the silver medal in the men's tournament.

== Wrestling ==
Two wrestlers represented Burkina Faso at the 2015 African Games. Blaise Debe won one of the bronze medals in the men's freestyle 74 kg event.
