= Democratic Republic of the Congo at the 2003 All-Africa Games =

- IOC code: COD
- NOC: Comité Olympique Congolais

in Abuja 5 October 2003 – 17 October 2003
- Medals Ranked 28th: Gold 0 Silver 1 Bronze 1 Total 2

All-Africa Games appearances (overview)
- 1965; 1973–1978; 1987; 1991; 1995; 1999; 2003; 2007; 2011; 2015; 2019; 2023

Democratic Republic of the Congo competed in the 2003 All-Africa Games held at the National Stadium in the city of Abuja, Nigeria. The country sent 86 athletes to compete, including teams to compete in basketball and handball. The team won two medals, including a silver in women's basketball.

== Competitors ==
The Democratic Republic of the Congo took the Games as, in the words of Youth, Sports and Leisure Minister Omer Egbake, "an opportunity to strengthen its unity, and resume its leading position in African sporting competitions" and planned to send 117 athletes to compete in the games, and enter 11 events. In the event, 86 qualified for entry, 34 men and 52 women.

Competitors included Kitenge Fibel who competed in both the Men's 200 and 400 metres and Kayembe Tshiaba who entered the Men's shot put. The women's football team was a last minute replacement for Ghana, who pulled out of the tournament. The team won their first match against Algeria on 4 October, but subsequently were eliminated in the qualifying stage. The women's team entered in Group B of the handball tournament, while the women's national team entered the basketball competition optimistically of a medal after coming second in 1999.

== Medal summary ==
Democratic Republic of the Congo won two medals, a silver and a bronze medal, and was ranked twenty-eighth in the final medal table.

=== Medal table ===
Sport	Gold	Silver	Bronze	Total
Basketball	0	1	0	1
Total	0	1	1	2

== List of Medalists ==
=== Silver Medal ===
Medal	Name	Sport	Event	Date	Ref
Silver	Democratic Republic of the Congo	Basketball	Women's Basketball	10 October 2003	

=== See also ===
- Democratic Republic of the Congo at the African Games
