= Handball at the 2015 African Games – Men's tournament =

2015 Handball at the 2015 African Games Men's tournament
Tournament details
- Host country: Congo
- Venue: 1 Palais des Sports (Kintélé) (in 1 Brazzaville host cities)
- Dates: 10–19 September 2015
- Teams: 10

Final positions
- Champions: Egypt (7th title)
- Runners-up: Angola
- Third place: Congo
- Fourth place: Nigeria

Tournament statistics
- Matches played: 16

The 2015 edition of the Men's Handball Tournament of the African Games was the 11th, organized by the African Handball Confederation and played under the auspices of the International Handball Federation, the handball sport governing body. The tournament was held from 10 to 19 September 2015 at the Palais des Sports Kintélé in Brazzaville, Republic of Congo, contested by 10 national teams and won by Egypt.

== Format ==
- The 10 teams were divided into four groups (Groups A+B+C+D) for the preliminary round.
- Round robin for the preliminary round; the top two teams of each group advanced to the quarterfinals.
- From there on a knockout system was used until the final.

== Draw ==
Group A	Group B	Group C	Group D
Libya; Senegal	Angola; Kenya; Nigeria	Congo; Ivory Coast	DR Congo; Egypt; Gabon

== Group stage ==
Times given below are in UTC+1.

=== Group A ===
Team	Pld	W	D	L	GF	GA	GD	Pts
Libya	2	2	0	0	48	40	+8	4
Senegal	2	0	0	2	40	48	−8	0

11 September 2015; 14:00	Senegal	24–28	Libya	Palais des Sports (Kintélé), Brazzaville; Referees: Alaine Massimina (CGO)
11 September 2015; 14:00	Ndiaye 3	(13–15)	Galmouz 7	Palais des Sports (Kintélé), Brazzaville; Referees: Alaine Massimina (CGO)
11 September 2015; 14:00	5× (suspension)	Report	3× (yellow card) 4× (suspension)	Palais des Sports (Kintélé), Brazzaville; Referees: Alaine Massimina (CGO)

13 September 2015; 16:00	Libya	20–16	Senegal	Palais des Sports (Kintélé), Brazzaville; Referees: Yalatima Coulibaly, Mamoudou Diabate (CIV)
13 September 2015; 16:00	Amoura 5	(06–09)	Ndiaye 6	Palais des Sports (Kintélé), Brazzaville; Referees: Yalatima Coulibaly, Mamoudou Diabate (CIV)
13 September 2015; 16:00	3× (yellow card) 3× (suspension)	Report	4× (yellow card) 7× (suspension)	Palais des Sports (Kintélé), Brazzaville; Referees: Yalatima Coulibaly, Mamoudou Diabate (CIV)

=== Group B ===
Team	Pld	W	D	L	GF	GA	GD	Pts
Nigeria	2	2	0	0	50	40	+10	4
Angola	2	1	0	1	57	32	+25	2
Kenya	2	0	0	2	28	63	−35	0

11 September 2015; 16:00	Angola	36–09	Kenya	Palais des Sports (Kintélé), Brazzaville; Referees: Sonia Beloum, Ida Zoehinga (BUR)
11 September 2015; 16:00	Hebo 9	(19–03)	Koga 3	Palais des Sports (Kintélé), Brazzaville; Referees: Sonia Beloum, Ida Zoehinga (BUR)
11 September 2015; 16:00	3× (yellow card) 3× (suspension)	Report	4× (suspension)	Palais des Sports (Kintélé), Brazzaville; Referees: Sonia Beloum, Ida Zoehinga (BUR)

13 September 2015; 12:00	Kenya	19–27	Nigeria	Palais des Sports (Kintélé), Brazzaville; Referees: Alaine Massimina, Sylvain Ogango (CGO)
13 September 2015; 12:00	Bryan 5	(06–11)	Shehu 8	Palais des Sports (Kintélé), Brazzaville; Referees: Alaine Massimina, Sylvain Ogango (CGO)
13 September 2015; 12:00	2× (yellow card) 4× (suspension)	Report	3× (suspension) 3× (red card)	Palais des Sports (Kintélé), Brazzaville; Referees: Alaine Massimina, Sylvain Ogango (CGO)

15 September 2015; 16:00	Nigeria	23–21	Angola	Palais des Sports (Kintélé), Brazzaville; Referees: Alaine Massimina, Sylvain Ogango (CGO)
15 September 2015; 16:00	Philip 9	(10–09)	four players 3	Palais des Sports (Kintélé), Brazzaville; Referees: Alaine Massimina, Sylvain Ogango (CGO)
15 September 2015; 16:00	3× (yellow card) 4× (suspension)	Report	2× (yellow card) 4× (suspension)	Palais des Sports (Kintélé), Brazzaville; Referees: Alaine Massimina, Sylvain Ogango (CGO)

=== Group C ===
Team	Pld	W	D	L	GF	GA	GD	Pts
Congo	2	1	1	0	55	52	+3	3
Ivory Coast	2	0	1	1	52	55	−3	1

13 September 2015; 18:00	Congo	26–26	Ivory Coast	Palais des Sports (Kintélé), Brazzaville; Referees: Yawo Akpatsa, Agbeko Assignon (TOG)
13 September 2015; 18:00	Costodes 6	(16–11)	Kanate 8	Palais des Sports (Kintélé), Brazzaville; Referees: Yawo Akpatsa, Agbeko Assignon (TOG)
13 September 2015; 18:00		Report	4× (yellow card) 4× (suspension)	Palais des Sports (Kintélé), Brazzaville; Referees: Yawo Akpatsa, Agbeko Assignon (TOG)

15 September 2015; 18:00	Ivory Coast	26–29	Congo	Palais des Sports (Kintélé), Brazzaville; Referees: Heidy Elsaied, Yasmina Elsaied (EGY)
15 September 2015; 18:00	Kanate 9	(13–14)	Kelantima, Angao 7	Palais des Sports (Kintélé), Brazzaville; Referees: Heidy Elsaied, Yasmina Elsaied (EGY)
15 September 2015; 18:00	2× (yellow card) 8× (suspension)	Report	5× (suspension)	Palais des Sports (Kintélé), Brazzaville; Referees: Heidy Elsaied, Yasmina Elsaied (EGY)

=== Group D ===
Team	Pld	W	D	L	GF	GA	GD	Pts
Egypt	2	2	0	0	57	45	+12	4
Gabon	2	0	1	1	55	61	−6	1
DR Congo	2	0	1	1	50	56	−6	1

11 September 2015; 18:00	Egypt	31–25	Gabon	Palais des Sports (Kintélé), Brazzaville
11 September 2015; 18:00	Mostafa 7	(17–09)	Leckibi, Milama 7	Palais des Sports (Kintélé), Brazzaville
11 September 2015; 18:00	3× (yellow card) 6× (suspension)	Report	1× (yellow card) 3× (suspension)	Palais des Sports (Kintélé), Brazzaville

13 September 2015; 14:00	DR Congo	30–30	Gabon	Palais des Sports (Kintélé), Brazzaville; Referees: Felly Amba, Arsène Datondji (COD)
13 September 2015; 14:00	Jamal 10	(15–16)	Mamadou 5	Palais des Sports (Kintélé), Brazzaville; Referees: Felly Amba, Arsène Datondji (COD)
13 September 2015; 14:00	3× (yellow card) 5× (suspension) 1× (red card)	Report	3× (yellow card) 7× (suspension)	Palais des Sports (Kintélé), Brazzaville; Referees: Felly Amba, Arsène Datondji (COD)

15 September 2015; 14:00	DR Congo	20–26	Egypt	Palais des Sports (Kintélé), Brazzaville; Referees: Yalatima Coulibaly, Mamoudou Diabate (CIV)
15 September 2015; 14:00	Ike 6	(10–18)	Moustafa, Fouad 4	Palais des Sports (Kintélé), Brazzaville; Referees: Yalatima Coulibaly, Mamoudou Diabate (CIV)
15 September 2015; 14:00	2× (yellow card) 4× (suspension)	Report	2× (yellow card) 6× (suspension)	Palais des Sports (Kintélé), Brazzaville; Referees: Yalatima Coulibaly, Mamoudou Diabate (CIV)

== Knockout stage ==
All matches were played in: Palais des sports Kintélé, Brazzaville

Quarter-finals
17 September 2015
Libya	18
Angola	30
17 September 2015
Nigeria	29
Senegal	18
17 September 2015
Ivory Coast	17
Egypt	27
17 September 2015
Gabon	24
Congo	25

Semi-finals
18 September 2015
Nigeria	13
Angola	19
18 September 2015
Congo	15
Egypt	35

Final
19 September 2015
Egypt	25
Angola	23
Third place
19 September 2015
Congo	32
Nigeria	29

=== Quarter-finals ===
17 September 2015; 12:00	Libya	18–30	Angola	Palais des Sports (Kintélé), Brazzaville; Referees: Jonas Allade, Arsène Datondji (BEN)
17 September 2015; 12:00	Galmouz 7	(11–18)	Moreno 8	Palais des Sports (Kintélé), Brazzaville; Referees: Jonas Allade, Arsène Datondji (BEN)
17 September 2015; 12:00	3× (yellow card) 7× (suspension)	Report	3× (yellow card) 6× (suspension)	Palais des Sports (Kintélé), Brazzaville; Referees: Jonas Allade, Arsène Datondji (BEN)

17 September 2015; 14:00	Nigeria	29–18	Senegal	Palais des Sports (Kintélé), Brazzaville; Referees: Heidy Elsaied, Yasmina Elsaied (EGY)
17 September 2015; 14:00	Shehu 9	(14–06)	Gueye 4	Palais des Sports (Kintélé), Brazzaville; Referees: Heidy Elsaied, Yasmina Elsaied (EGY)
17 September 2015; 14:00	2× (yellow card) 1× (suspension)	Report	1× (yellow card) 7× (suspension)	Palais des Sports (Kintélé), Brazzaville; Referees: Heidy Elsaied, Yasmina Elsaied (EGY)

17 September 2015; 16:00	Ivory Coast	17–27	Egypt	Palais des Sports (Kintélé), Brazzaville; Referees: Sonia Beloum, Ida Zoehinga (BUR)
17 September 2015; 16:00	Hossam, Tamer	(09–15)	Morou, Vanie	Palais des Sports (Kintélé), Brazzaville; Referees: Sonia Beloum, Ida Zoehinga (BUR)
17 September 2015; 16:00	2× (yellow card) 3× (suspension)	Report	3× (suspension)	Palais des Sports (Kintélé), Brazzaville; Referees: Sonia Beloum, Ida Zoehinga (BUR)

17 September 2015; 18:00	Gabon	24–25	Congo	Palais des Sports (Kintélé), Brazzaville; Referees: Yawo Akpatsa, Agbeko Assignon (TOG)
17 September 2015; 18:00	Nzamba, Nze Mba 4	(09–13)	Angao 8	Palais des Sports (Kintélé), Brazzaville; Referees: Yawo Akpatsa, Agbeko Assignon (TOG)
17 September 2015; 18:00	3× (yellow card) 3× (suspension)	Report	2× (yellow card) 5× (suspension)	Palais des Sports (Kintélé), Brazzaville; Referees: Yawo Akpatsa, Agbeko Assignon (TOG)

=== Semi-finals ===
18 September 2015; 17:00	Nigeria	13–19	Angola	Palais des Sports (Kintélé), Brazzaville; Referees: Yawo Akpatsa, Agbeko Assignon (TOG)
18 September 2015; 17:00	Philip 5	(04–11)	Moreno 7	Palais des Sports (Kintélé), Brazzaville; Referees: Yawo Akpatsa, Agbeko Assignon (TOG)
18 September 2015; 17:00	3× (yellow card) 4× (suspension)	Report	3× (yellow card) 7× (suspension)	Palais des Sports (Kintélé), Brazzaville; Referees: Yawo Akpatsa, Agbeko Assignon (TOG)

18 September 2015; 19:30	Congo	15–35	Egypt	Palais des Sports (Kintélé), Brazzaville; Referees: Yalatima Coulibaly, Mamoudou Diabate (CIV)
18 September 2015; 19:30	Angao 7	(09–21)	Nasr 8	Palais des Sports (Kintélé), Brazzaville; Referees: Yalatima Coulibaly, Mamoudou Diabate (CIV)
18 September 2015; 19:30	2× (yellow card) 2× (suspension)	Report	3× (yellow card) 1× (suspension)	Palais des Sports (Kintélé), Brazzaville; Referees: Yalatima Coulibaly, Mamoudou Diabate (CIV)

=== Bronze medal match ===
19 September 2015; 08:00	Congo	32–29	Nigeria	Palais des Sports (Kintélé), Brazzaville
19 September 2015; 08:00	Mopiti 5	(16–17)	Adamu 4	Palais des Sports (Kintélé), Brazzaville
19 September 2015; 08:00	3× (yellow card) 3× (suspension)	Report	5× (yellow card) 3× (suspension)	Palais des Sports (Kintélé), Brazzaville

=== Gold medal match ===
19 September 2015
12:00
Egypt
25–23 (ET)
Angola
Palais des Sports (Kintélé), Brazzaville
Referees: Yawo Akpatsa, Agbeko Assignon (TOG)
Nasr 6
(12–13)
Moreno 6
2× (yellow card) 8× (suspension)
Report
2× (yellow card) 8× (suspension)

FT: 20–20 ET: 25–23

== Final standings ==
Rank	Team	Record
Gold medal	Egypt	5–0–0
Silver medal	Angola	3–0–2
Bronze medal	Congo	3–1–1
4	Nigeria	3–0–2
5	Libya	2–0–1
6	Gabon	0–1–2
7	Ivory Coast	0–1–2
8	Senegal	0–0–3
9	DR Congo	0–1–1
10	Kenya	0–0–2

2015 African Games Men's Handball winner

Egypt
7th title
