= Chad at the 2015 African Games =

- Flag of Chad
- IOC code: CHA
- NOC: Chadian Olympic and Sports Committee

in Brazzaville, Republic of the Congo 4 September 2015 – 19 September 2015
- Medals: Gold 0 Silver 0 Bronze 2 Total 2

African Games appearances (overview)
- 1965; 1973; 1978; 1987; 1991–2007; 2011; 2015; 2019; 2023

Chad competed at the 2015 African Games held in Brazzaville, Republic of the Congo.

== Medal summary ==
=== Medal table ===
Medal	Name	Sport	Event	Date
Bronze	Dieudonne Basil	Wrestling	Men's freestyle 97 kg	
Bronze	Dieudonne Basil	Wrestling	Men's Greco-Roman 98 kg	

== Judo ==
Three judoka represented Chad at the 2015 African Games.

== Wrestling ==
Chad won two medals in wrestling. Dieudonne Basil won a bronze medal in both the men's freestyle 97 kg event and in the men's Greco-Roman 98 kg event.
