= Cameroon at the 2015 African Games =

- Flag of Cameroon
- IOC code: CMR
- NOC: Cameroon Olympic and Sports Committee

African Games appearances
- 1965; 1973; 1978; 1987; 1991; 1995; 1999; 2003; 2007; 2011; 2015; 2019; 2023

Cameroon competed at the 2015 African Games which was held in Brazzaville, Republic of the Congo.

== Medal summary ==
=== Medal table ===
Medal	Name	Sport	Event	Date
Gold	Hélène Wezeu Dombeu	Judo	Women's 63 kg	
Gold	Annabelle Ali	Wrestling	Women's 75 kg	
Silver	Women's team	Football	Women's tournament	
Silver	Rebecca Muambo	Wrestling	Women's 48 kg	
Silver	Berthe Etane Ngolle	Wrestling	Women's 63 kg	
Bronze	Dieudonne Dolassem	Judo	Men's 90 kg	
Bronze	Seidou Nji Mouluh	Judo	Men's 100 kg	
Bronze	Hortence Vanessa Mballa Atangana	Judo	Women's 78 kg	
Bronze	Nadine Wetie Diodjo	Judo	Women's +78 kg	

== Football ==
Cameroon won the silver medal in the women's tournament.

== Judo ==
Hélène Wezeu Dombeu won the gold medal in the women's 63 kg event.

== Wrestling ==
Cameroon won several medals in wrestling.
