= Deo Gracia Ngokaba =

Congolese judoka

Personal information
- Nationality: Congolese
- Born: 17 May 1997 (age 28)
- Occupation: Judoka

Sport
- Sport: Judo

Profile at external databases
- JudoInside.com: 79434

Deo Gracia Ngokaba (born 17 May 1997) is a Congolese judoka. He is a 2015 African Games bronze medalist.

He competed at the 2016 Summer Olympics in Rio de Janeiro, in the men's +100 kg, where he was eliminated by Roy Meyer in the second round.
