= Prince Kosi Samuzu =

Democratic Republic of the Congo judoka

Personal information
- Nationality: Congolese
- Born: March 6, 1993 (age 33)
- Occupation: Judoka

Sport
- Sport: Judo
- Event: 100 kg
Medal record
Men's judo
Representing Democratic Republic of the Congo
African Games
Bronze medal – third place	2019 Rabat	–100 kg

Profile at external databases
- JudoInside.com: 100203

Prince Kosi Samuzu (born 6 March 1993) is a Congolese judoka. He competed at the 2019 African Games, winning a bronze medal in the men's –100 kg category. He also competed in the 2015 African Games but did not win a medal.
