= Democratic Republic of the Congo at the 2015 African Games =

Democratic Republic of the Congo at the 2015 All-Africa Games
- IOC code: COD
- NOC: Comité Olympique Congolais

in Brazzaville
- Competitors: 208 in 12 sports
- Medals Ranked 16th: Gold 2 Silver 4 Bronze 10 Total 16

All-Africa Games appearances (overview)
- 1965; 1973–1978; 1987; 1991; 1995; 1999; 2003; 2007; 2011; 2015; 2019; 2023

The Democratic Republic of the Congo at the 2015 All-Africa Games had athletes competing in taekwondo, table tennis, swimming, athletics, karate, badminton, cycling, basketball, boxing, judo and volleyball.

Tennis player Denis Indondo became the first DRC athlete to win a gold medal in the African Games since the Congolese boxer Jesus Kibunde had won a gold at the 1999 edition of the Games.
