= Valeria Bhunu =

Zimbabwean former tennis player

- Country (sports): Zimbabwe
- Born: 3 April 1995 (age 31) Zimbabwe
- Retired: 2026
- Plays: Right-handed (two-handed backhand)
- Prize money: US$44,592

Singles
- Career record: 158–112
- Career titles: 3 ITF
- Highest ranking: No. 497 (14 November 2016)

Doubles
- Career record: 59–81
- Highest ranking: No. 534 (21 November 2016)
Medal record
Women's tennis
Representing Zimbabwe
African Games
| Bronze medal – third place | 2015 Brazzaville | Singles |
| Bronze medal – third place | 2015 Brazzaville | Doubles |
| Bronze medal – third place | 2015 Brazzaville | Team |
- Last updated on: 01 May 2026.

Valeria Bhunu (born 3 April 1995) is a Zimbabwean former tennis player.

Bhunu won three singles titles on the ITF Women's Circuit. On 14 November 2016, she reached her world's best singles ranking, No. 497. On 21 November 2016, she peaked at No. 534 in the doubles rankings.

In 2015, she played for Zimbabwe in the 2015 African Games in Brazzaville, Republic of the Congo where she won the bronze medal in women's singles and doubles.

In 2022, Bhunu was given three years and three months suspension for an anti-doping rule violation after testing positive for mesterolone. Her sentence ended in 2025 and she started playing tennis again in February of that year.

Bhunu announced her retirement from professional tennis in February 2026.

== ITF Circuit finals ==
=== Singles: 8 (3 titles, 5 runner-ups) ===
| Legend W25 tournaments W10/15 tournaments | Finals by surface Hard (3–5) |

| Result | W–L | Date | Tournament | Tier | Surface | Opponent | Score |
|---|---|---|---|---|---|---|---|
| Win | 1–0 | Nov 2015 | ITF Stellenbosch, South Africa | W10 | Hard | (Germany) Katharina Hering | 6–4, 6–0 |
| Loss | 1–1 | Jun 2016 | ITF Grand-Baie, Mauritius | W10 | Hard | (India) Snehadevi Reddy | 4–6, 6–4, 3–6 |
| Loss | 1–2 | Sep 2016 | ITF Sharm El Sheikh, Egypt | W10 | Hard | (Slovakia) Tereza Mihalíková | 3–6, 6–7^{(3)} |
| Loss | 1–3 | Jul 2018 | ITF Corroios, Portugal | W15 | Hard | (New Zealand) Paige Hourigan | 4–6, 3–6 |
| Win | 2–3 | Jun 2021 | ITF Monastir, Tunisia | W15 | Hard | (Japan) Saki Imamura | 6–2, 6–2 |
| Loss | 2–4 | Sep 2021 | ITF Johannesburg, South Africa | W25 | Hard | (Netherlands) Richèl Hogenkamp | 3–6, 6–4, 3–6 |
| Win | 3–4 | Jun 2025 | ITF Hillcrest, South Africa | W15 | Hard | (France) Astrid Cirotte | 7–6^{(3)}, 6–3 |
| Loss | 3–5 | Jul 2025 | ITF Monastir, Tunisia | W15 | Hard | (Latvia) Beatrise Zeltiņa | 3–6, 2–6 |

=== Doubles: 6 (6 runner-ups) ===
| Legend W25 tournaments W10/15 tournaments | Finals by surface Hard (0–6) |

| Result | W–L | Date | Tournament | Tier | Surface | Partner | Opponents | Score |
|---|---|---|---|---|---|---|---|---|
| Loss | 0–1 | Nov 2015 | ITF Stellenbosch, South Africa | W10 | Hard | (Namibia) Lesedi Sheya Jacobs | (South Africa) Madrie Le Roux (Netherlands) Erika Vogelsang | 6–7^{(6)}, 2–6 |
| Loss | 0–2 | Dec 2015 | Lagos Open, Nigeria | W25 | Hard | (Israel) Ester Masuri | (Russia) Margarita Lazareva (Ukraine) Valeriya Strakhova | 1–6, 2–6 |
| Loss | 0–3 | Nov 2016 | ITF Stellenbosch, South Africa | W10 | Hard | (Sweden) Linnea Malmqvist | (United States) Kaitlyn Christian (South Africa) Chanel Simmonds | 0–6, 6–7^{(3)} |
| Loss | 0–4 | Nov 2016 | ITF Stellenbosch, South Africa | W10 | Hard | (Sweden) Linnea Malmqvist | (South Africa) Ilze Hattingh (South Africa) Madrie Le Roux | 1–6, 2–6 |
| Loss | 0–5 | Mar 2018 | ITF Manama, Bahrain | W15 | Hard | (United Kingdom) Emily Webley-Smith | (Oman) Fatma Al-Nabhani (Philippines) Marian Capadocia | 5–7, 2–6 |
| Loss | 0–6 | May 2025 | ITF Monastir, Tunisia | W15 | Hard | (Tunisia) Lina Soussi | Anastasiia Gureva; Ekaterina Khayrutdinova | 1–6, 1–6 |
