= Chad at the 2023 African Games =

- Flag of Chad
- IOC code: CHA
- NOC: Chadian Olympic and Sports Committee

in Accra, Ghana 8 March 2024 – 23 March 2024
- Competitors: ~50 in 5 sports
- Medals Ranked 41st: Gold 0 Silver 0 Bronze 1 Total 1

African Games appearances (overview)
- 1965; 1973; 1978; 1987; 1991–2007; 2011; 2015; 2019; 2023

Chad competed at the 2023 African Games held from 8 to 23 March 2024 in Accra, Ghana. Chad competed in 5 sports.

== Medal table ==
Medal	Name	Sport	Event	Date
Bronze	Casimir Betel	Taekwondo	Men's −58 kg	20 March
