= Beach volleyball at the 2015 African Games =

- Dates: 9 – 18 September
- Website: http://www.cojabrazzaville2015.com

Beach Volleyball at the 2015 African Games was held from September 4–14, 2015 at several venues.

== Events ==
=== Medal summary ===
Event	Gold	Silver	Bronze
Men	Angola; Edson Figueiredo; Eden Sequeira	Mozambique; Délcio Soares; Carlos Acácio	South Africa; Clinton Stemmet; Leo Williams
Women	Nigeria; Priscilla Agera; Isabella Laju	South Africa; Palesa Masinga; Randy Williams	Rwanda; Denyse Mutatsimpundu; Charlotte Nzayisenga
