= Vilma Nenganga =

Angolan handball player

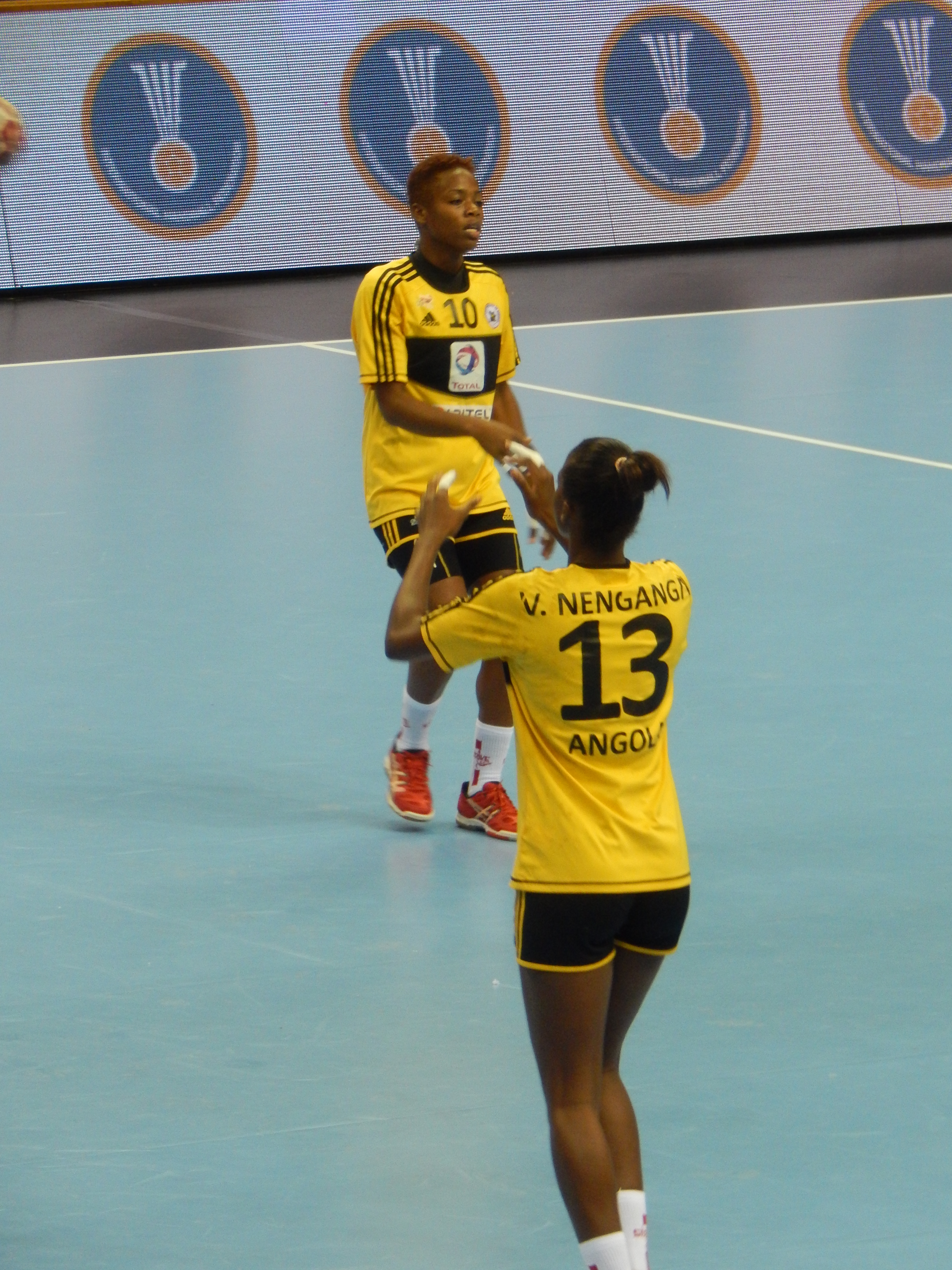
- Nenganga in 2016 (#13)

Personal information
- Full name: Vilma Pegado Nenganga
- Nationality: Angolan
- Born: 12 September 1996 (age 30)
- Height: 1.72 m (5 ft 8 in)

Sport
- Sport: Handball
- Position: Centre back
- Current club: Petro de Luanda
- Number: 2
National team
Years	Team	Apps	(Gls)
–	Angola	24	(83)
Medal record
African Championship
Gold medal – first place	2016 Luanda
Gold medal – first place	2018 Brazzaville
Gold medal – first place	2024 Kinshasa
African Games
Gold medal – first place	2015 Brazzaville	Team
African Junior Championship
Gold medal – first place	2015 Nairobi
- Updated on 10 November 2025

Vilma Pegado Nenganga (born 2 November 1996) is an Angolan handball player for Petro de Luanda.

== National team ==
Nenganga made her debut in the Angolan national team at the 2015 African Games, where Angola won gold medals.

As a youth player, she was a member of the Angolan team to the 2014 Youth Olympics.

She then represented Angola at the 2016 Olympics. In 2019 she won the Carpathian Trophy with Angola. Two years later she represented Angola at the 2021 World Championship in Spain. She scored 15 goals during the tournament.

At the 2024 Olympics she scored 26 goals, the most of any player on the Angolan team.

== Club career ==
Nenganga started her career at the Angolan team Petro de Luanda.

== Achievements ==
- Carpathian Trophy:
  - Winner: 2019
