= Filipe Cruz (handballer) =

Angolan handball player and coach

Personal information
- Full name: Filipe de Carvalho Pinto da Cruz
- Nationality: Angolan
- Born: 7 September 1969 (age 57) Luanda, Angola

Sport
- Sport: Handball
- Current club: Primeiro de Agosto; Angola (Manager)
Medal record
African Men's Championship
Bronze medal – third place	Egypt 2016
Bronze medal – third place	Gabon 2018
African Women's Handball Championship
Gold medal – first place	Luanda 2016
African Games
Silver medal – second place	Brazzaville 2015
African Men's Junior Championship
Bronze medal – third place	Nairobi 2014

Filipe de Carvalho Pinto da Cruz, best known as Filipe Cruz (born 7 September 1969) is a former Angolan handball player and a current handball coach of Primeiro de Agosto and the Angolan national team.

== Career ==
As a coach, Filipe has been the head coach of the Angola men's national handball team since 2010, which he qualified for the 2017 World Men's Handball Championship, by finishing third in the 2016 African Men's Handball Championship, before qualifying the junior team to the 2015 Men's Junior World Handball Championship. In April 2016, he was appointed head coach of the Angola women's national handball team, ahead of the 2016 Summer Olympics tournament in Rio de Janeiro, a position he will serve alongside his current position as the men's team head coach.

As a player, Cruz has played for Portuguese side ABC Braga from 1997 to 2002.

He is also the head coach of Primeiro de Agosto men's handball team.

== Personal life ==
Cruz is the father of the Angola international footballer Sandro Cruz.
