= Wuta Dombaxe =

Angolan handball player (born 1986)

Personal information
- Full name: Wuta Waco Bige Dombaxe
- Nationality: Angolan
- Born: 5 April 1986 (age 40) Luanda, Angola
- Height: 1.81 m (5 ft 11 in)

Sport
- Sport: Handball
- Position: Right back
- Current club: Corona Brașov
- Number: 19
National team
| Years | Team | Apps | (Gls) |
| – | Angola | 74 | (50) |
Medal record
African Championship
| Gold medal – first place | 2016 Luanda |
| Gold medal – first place | 2018 Brazzaville |
| Gold medal – first place | 2021 Yaoundé |
| Gold medal – first place | 2022 Dakar |
African Games
| Gold medal – first place | 2015 Brazzaville | Team |

Wuta Dombaxe (born 5 April 1986) is an Angolan handball player for Romanian club Corona Brașov and the Angolan national team.

She competed at the 2009 World Women's Handball Championship in China, and at the 2015 World Women's Handball Championship in Denmark.

== Achievements ==
- Carpathian Trophy:
  - Winner: 2019
- IHF Super Globe
  - Winner: 2019
