= Doungou Camara =

French handball player (born 1995)

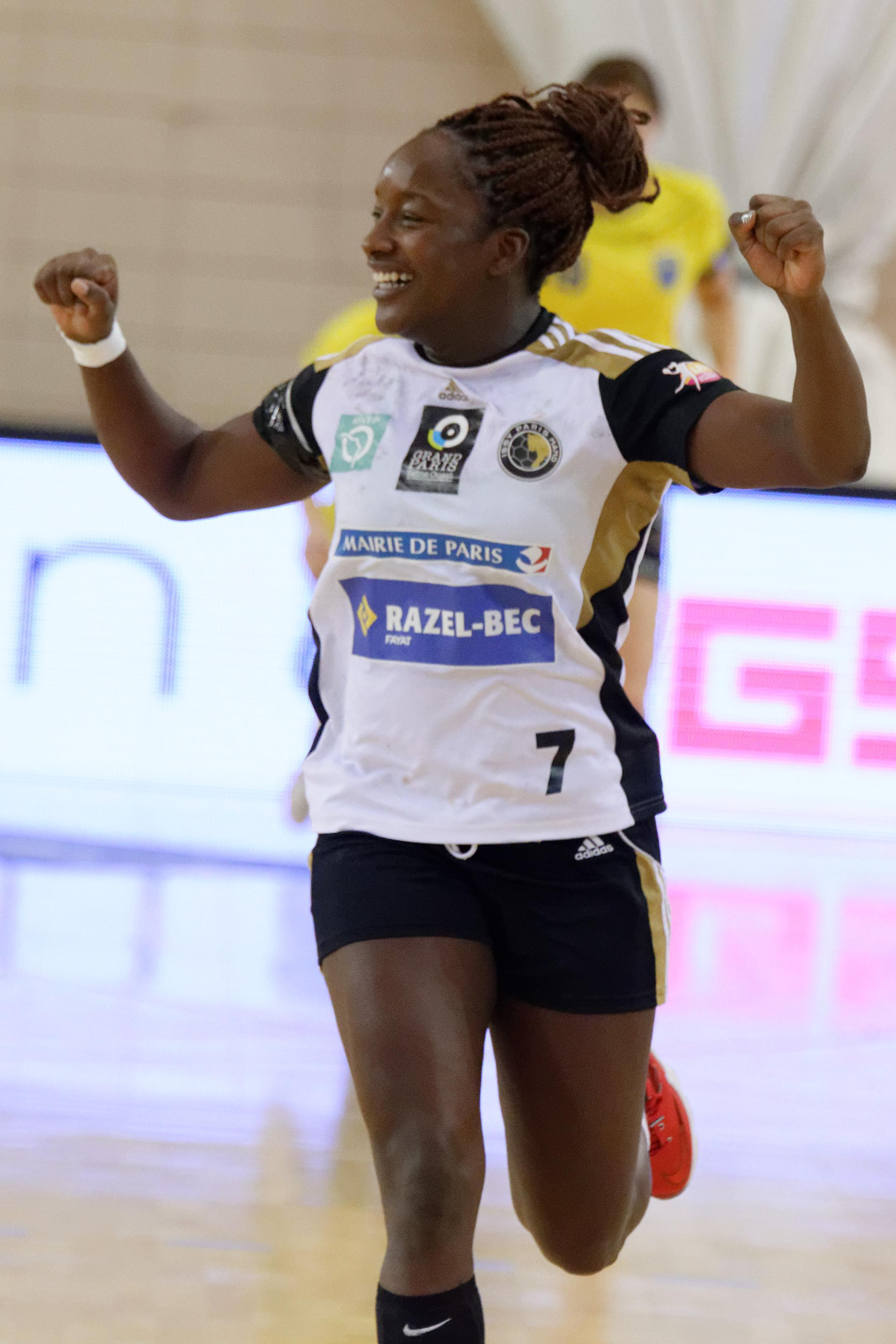
- Camara in 2015

Personal information
- Nationality: Senegalese
- Born: 7 January 1995 (age 31) Pontault-Combault, France
- Height: 1.68 m (5 ft 6 in)

Sport
- Sport: Handball
- Position: Right back
- Current club: Stella Sports Saint-Maur Handball
- Number: 7

Senior clubs
- Years: Team
- 2012–2017: Issy-Paris Hand
- 2017–2019: Le Havre AC Handball
- 2017–2020: Stella Sports Saint-Maur Handball
- 2020–: Fleury Loiret HB
National team
Years	Team		
–	France		
–	Senegal	34	
Medal record
Representing Senegal
African Championship
Silver medal – second place	2024 Kinshasa
African Games
Bronze medal – third place	2015 Republic of the Congo	Team
- Updated on 13 November 2023

Doungou Camara (born 7 January 1995) is a French born-Senegalese handball player for Fleury Loiret HB and the Senegalese national team.

She competed 2012/13 Cup Winners' Cup and 2013/14 Challenge Cup, placing second both times.

At the 2016 African Women's Handball Championship Senegal reached the semifinals, but were disqualified from the tournament for using Doungou Camara despite being ineligible, since she has already played for the French national team. Tunisia faced Angola in the final and Cameroon automatically occupied the third place.
