= Mariam Traore =

Ivorian handball player (born 1980)

Personal information
- Nationality: Ivorian
- Born: 1980 (age 45–46)
- Height: 5’9

Sport
- Sport: Handball
National team
- Years: Team
- –: Ivory Coast

Mariam Traore (born 1980) is an Ivorian team handball player. She plays on the Ivorian national team, and participated at the 2011 World Women's Handball Championship in Brazil.
