= Tennis at the 2015 African Games =

- Location: Republic of the Congo; Brazzaville
- Dates: 11–18 September

Tennis at the 2015 African Games in Brazzaville was held between September 11–18, 2015.

== Medal summary ==
Event	Gold	Silver	Bronze
Men's Singles	(Democratic Republic of the Congo) Denis Indondo	(Benin) Alexis Klegou	(Zimbabwe) Mark Fynn
Women's Singles	(Egypt) Sandra Samir	(Madagascar) Zarah Razafimahatratra	(Zimbabwe) Valeria Bhunu
Men's Doubles	(Ghana) Wisdom Na Ajdrago and George Darko	(Democratic Republic of the Congo) Dennis Indondo and Sarma Nkulufa	(Senegal) Omar Kâ and Y.Raynond Lauguina (Lesotho) Bishop Mosebi and Lebelo Mosehle
Women's Doubles	(Egypt) Ola Abou Zekry and Sandra Samir	(Egypt) Dona Abohabaga and Moura Ishak	(Nigeria) Melissa Ifidzhen and Elizabeth Pam (Zimbabwe) Valeria Bhunu and Pauline Chawafambira
Men's Team	Democratic Republic of the Congo	Nigeria	Zimbabwe; Egypt
Women's Team	Egypt	Republic of the Congo	Zimbabwe; Nigeria

== Medals table ==
Rank	Nation	Gold	Silver	Bronze	Total
1	Egypt (EGY)	3	1	1	5
2	DR Congo (COD)	2	1	0	3
3	Ghana (GHA)	1	0	0	1
4	Nigeria (NGA)	0	1	2	3
5	Benin (BEN)	0	1	0	1
5	Congo (CGO)	0	1	0	1
5	Madagascar (MAD)	0	1	0	1
8	Zimbabwe (ZIM)	0	0	5	5
9	Lesotho (LES)	0	0	1	1
9	Senegal (SEN)	0	0	1	1
Totals (10 entries)		6	6	10	22
