= Azenaide Carlos =

Angolan handball player (born 1990)

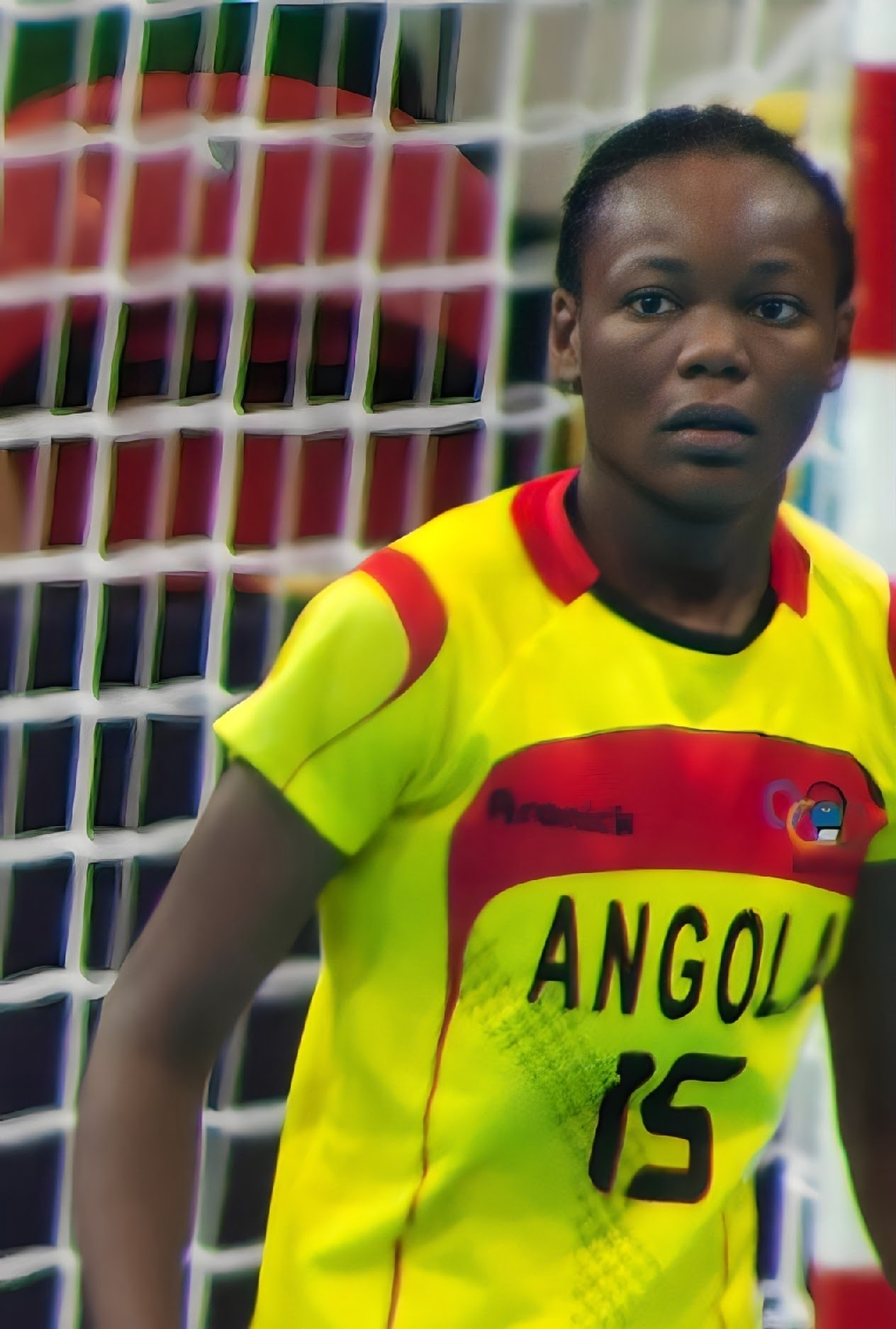
- Carlos in 2012

Personal information
- Full name: Azenaide Danila José Carlos
- Nationality: Angolan
- Born: 14 June 1990 (age 36) Luanda, Angola
- Height: 1.73 m (5 ft 8 in)

Sport
- Sport: Handball
- Position: Right back
- Current club: Crvena Zvezda
- Number: 35

Youth career
- Years: Team
- 2001–2008: Primeiro de Agosto

Senior clubs
- Years: Team
- 2009–2010: Primeiro de Agosto
- 2010–2011: BM Bera Bera
- 2012–2013: Primeiro de Agosto
- 2014–2019: Petro Atlético
- 2019–2021: RK Podravka Koprivnica
- 2021–2022: Rapid București
- 2022: Kastamonu
- 2023: Rapid București
- 2023–2025: CSM Corona Brașov
- 2025–: ŽRK Crvena Zvezda
National team
Years	Team	Apps	(Gls)
–	Angola	90	(265)
Medal record
African Championship
Gold medal – first place	2012 Salé
Gold medal – first place	2016 Luanda
Gold medal – first place	2018 Brazzaville
Gold medal – first place	2021 Yaoundé
Gold medal – first place	2024 Kinshasa
African Games
Gold medal – first place	2011 Maputo	Team
Gold medal – first place	2015 Brazzaville	Team

Azenaide Danila José Carlos (born 14 June 1990), also known as Zizica, is an Angolan handball player for ŽRK Crvena Zvezda and the Angolan handball team.

She participated at the 2011 World Women's Handball Championship in Brazil, and the 2008, 2012, 2016, 2020 and 2024 Olympics.

Azenaide had spent her entire career on the Angolan side Primeiro de Agosto. In January 2014, she moved to arch-rival Petro Atlético.

Olympic Games
Preceded by Natália Bernardo; Matias Montinho	Flag bearer for Angola; Paris 2024 with Edmilson Pedro	Succeeded by Incumbent
