= Zambia women's national handball team =

Zambia

Information
- Association: Handball Association of Zambia

Colours
1st	2nd
- Last updated on Unknown.

The Zambia women's national handball team is the national team of Zambia. It is governed by the Handball Association of Zambia and takes part in international handball competitions.

== African Championship record ==
- 2026 – Qualified
