= Palais des Sports (Kintélé) =

Sports venue in the Republic of the Congo

- Interactive map of Palais des Sports (Kintélé)
- Location: Brazzaville, Republic of the Congo
- Capacity: 10,134

Tenant
- 2015 African Games

The Palais des Sports is an arena in Brazzaville, in the Republic of the Congo. It is used for several events, like handball and concerts.
