= Natalia Fonseca =

Angolan handball player

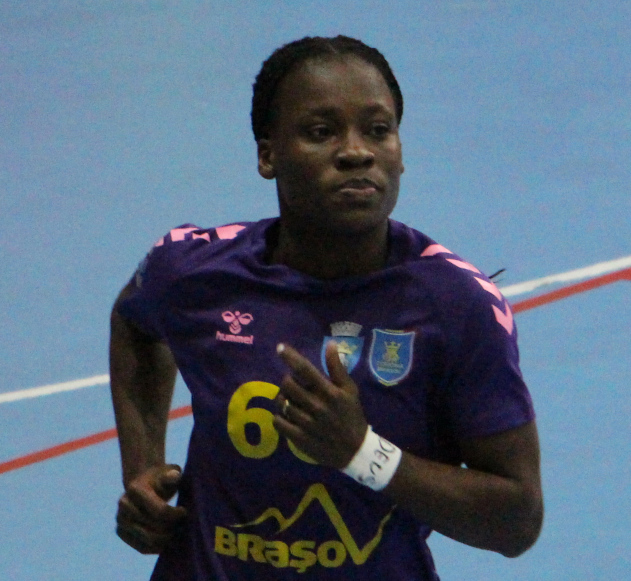
- Fonseca in 2023

Personal information
- Full name: Natalia Mafiela Kamalandua Fonseca
- Nationality: Angolan
- Born: 25 December 1998 (age 27)
- Height: 1.70 m (5 ft 7 in)

Sport
- Sport: Handball
- Position: Right wing
- Current club: Petro de Luanda
- Number: 6
National team
Years	Team	Apps	(Gls)
–	Angola	30	(85)
Medal record
African Championship
Gold medal – first place	2021 Yaoundé
Gold medal – first place	2024 Kinshasa
- Updated on 30 October 2023

Natália Mafiela Kamalandua Fonseca (born 25 December 1998) is an Angolan female handball player for Petro de Luanda and the Angolan national team.

She represented Angola at the 2017 World Women's Handball Championship in Germany.

== Achievements ==
- Carpathian Trophy:
  - Winner: 2019
