= Jesus Kibunde =

Congolese boxer (born 1979)

Personal information
- Nickname: The Black Tiger
- Nationality: Congolese
- Born: Jesus Kibunde Kakonge; 25 December 1979 (age 46) Lubumbashi, Zaire
- Weight: Super-featherweight; Lightweight; Light-welterweight

Boxing career

Boxing record
- Total fights: 31
- Wins: 20
- Win by KO: 8
- Losses: 10
Medal record
Representing Democratic Republic of the Congo
Men's boxing
All-Africa Games
Gold medal – first place	1999 Johannesburg	60 kg

Jesus Kibunde Kakonge (born 25 December 1979) is a Congolese former professional boxer who competed from 2004 to 2016. As an amateur, he won a gold medal at the 1999 All-Africa Games, one of his country's only two gold medals at the African Games since its name change from Zaire in 1997. He was made winner in the semi-final after his opponent tested positive for drugs, and his opponent in the final got sick with the flu and dropped out, leaving him the gold.
