= Stelvia Pascoal =

Angolan handball player (born 2002)

Personal information
- Full name: Stelvia de Jesus Pascoal
- Nationality: Angolan
- Born: 20 October 2002 (age 24)
- Height: 172 cm (68 in)
- Weight: 77 kg (170 lb)

Sport
- Sport: Handball
- Position: Left back
- Current club: CS Rapid București

Senior clubs
- Years: Team
- -2022: Atlético Petróleos de Luanda
- 2022-2023: Metz Handball
- 2023-2025: Saint-Amand Handball
- 2025-: CS Rapid București
National team
Years	Team	Apps	(Gls)
–	Angola	43	(73)
Medal record
African Championship
Gold medal – first place	2022 Dakar
Gold medal – first place	2024 Kinshasa
- Updated on November 2025

Stelvia de Jesus Pascoal (born 20 October 2002) is an Angolan handball player. She plays left back for CS Rapid București and the Angola women's handball team.

== Career ==
Part of the Angolan team that won the 2021 African Women's Handball Championship in Yaoundé, she qualified to represent Angola in the Olympics.

== 2020 Tokyo Summer Olympics ==
Pascoal participated in the 2020 Tokyo Summer Olympics, where the Angola women's handball team ranked 10th.
