= Anne Essam =

Cameroonian handball player

Personal information
- Full name: Anne Michelle Essam
- Nationality: Cameroonian
- Born: 6 January 1992 (age 34)
- Height: 1.77 m (5 ft 10 in)

Sport
- Sport: Handball
- Position: Centre back
- Current club: FAP Yaoundé
National team
Years	Team	Apps
–	Cameroon	30
Medal record
African Championship
Silver medal – second place	2022 Dakar

Anne Michelle Essam (born 6 January 1992) is a Cameroonian handball player for FAP Yaoundé and the Cameroonian national team.

She participated at the 2017 World Women's Handball Championship. At the 2022 African Championship she won silver medals, losing to Angola in the final.
