= Mali women's national handball team =

Mali

Information
- Association: Fédération Malienne de Handball

Colours
1st	2nd
- Last updated on Unknown.

The Mali women's national handball team is the national team of Mali. It is governed by the Fédération Malienne de Handball and takes part in international handball competitions.

== African Championship record ==
- 2026 – Qualified
