= 2015 African Games =

Multi-sport event in Brazzaville, Republic of the Congo

XI African Games
- Host city: Brazzaville, Republic of the Congo
- Nations: 54 (projected)
- Athletes: 15,000 (projected athletes, coaches, officials)
- Events: 323 in 20 sports
- Opening: 4 September 2015
- Closing: 19 September 2015
- Opened by: Denis Sassou Nguesso; President of the Republic of the Congo
- Torch lighter: Christoffer Mafoumbi
- Main venue: Kintele Stadium
- Website: Cojabrazzaville2015.com

The 11th African Games (French: 11es Jeux africains), also known as Brazzaville 2015, took place from September 4–19, 2015 in Brazzaville, Republic of the Congo. This edition marked the 50th anniversary of the Games, as well as their return to Brazzaville, which hosted the first edition in 1965.

== Host awarding ==
Ghana, Kenya and Congo all showed interest in bidding for the 11th edition of the Games. On September 14, 2011, the Supreme Council for Sports in Africa awarded the rights to Brazzaville to host.

== Name change ==
In January 2012 during the Executive Council meeting of the African Union held in Addis Ababa, Ethiopia was taken a decision for the name change from All-Africa Games to African Games. The 11th edition of Brazzaville 2015 started under this new name.

== Opening ceremony ==
The opening ceremony was held on 4 September 2015 at the newly built Kintele Stadium. Congolese national anthem started the ceremony, performed by Abel Mona. Parade of nations then started with Mozambique entering first as the previous host in 2011 and Republic of Congo came out last as the current host. In the artistic sequence, performers dressed with the colors of Congolese flag formed the word bienvenue (welcome) and followed by various dances and the lighting of the torch.

== Participating nations ==
Location of Brazzaville in Republic of the Congo.

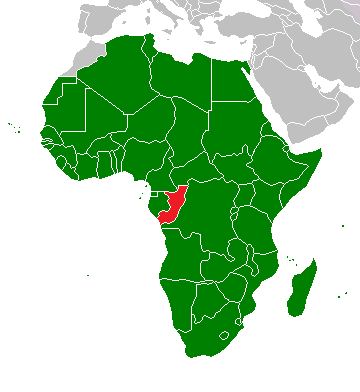
All countries participating in the 2015 All-Africa Games in green. Host country (Republic of the Congo) in red.

The Sahrawi Arab Democratic Republic were to take part in the games for the first time. However, because the country was not yet affiliated with the international federations of the sports that it had intended to attend, the Congolese organising committee determined its athletes could not participate. Morocco protested the decision by pulling out of the Games.

- Algeria (235)
- Angola
- Benin
- Botswana
- Burkina Faso
- Burundi
- Cameroon
- Cape Verde
- Central African Republic
- Chad (40)
- Comoros
- Republic of the Congo (host)
- Ivory Coast
- Djibouti
- Democratic Republic of the Congo
- Egypt (298)
- Equatorial Guinea
- Eritrea
- Ethiopia
- Gabon
- The Gambia
- Ghana
- Guinea
- Guinea-Bissau
- Kenya (364)
- Lesotho
- Liberia (7)
- Libya
- Madagascar
- Malawi
- Mali
- Mauritania
- Mauritius
- Mozambique
- Namibia (79)
- Niger
- Nigeria (573)
- Rwanda
- São Tomé and Príncipe
- Senegal (287)
- Seychelles
- Sierra Leone
- Somalia
- South Africa (150)
- South Sudan
- Sudan (90)
- Swaziland
- Tanzania
- Togo
- Tunisia (111)
- Uganda
- Zambia
- Zimbabwe

== Sports ==
22 separate sports have been announced for the 2015 African Games (2 demonstration), and two additional disability sports (Athletics and Weightlifting):

- Athletics (46 + 28)
- Badminton (6)
- Basketball (2)
- Beach volleyball (2)
- Boxing (13)
- Cycling (6)
- Fencing (12)
- Football (2)
- Gymnastics (16)
- Handball (2)
- Judo (14)
- Karate (16)
- Pétanque (2)
- Swimming (42)
- Tennis (6)
- Table tennis (7)
- Taekwondo (16)
- Volleyball (2)
- Weightlifting (45 + 14)
- Wrestling (24)
- Nzango (demonstration)
- Pharaoh Boxing (demonstration)

== Calendar ==
The schedule of the games was as follows. The calendar is to be completed with event finals information.

OC	Opening ceremony	●	Event competitions	1	Event finals	CC	Closing ceremony

September	2nd Wed	3rd Thu	4th Fri	5th Sat	6th Sun	7th Mon	8th Tue	9th Wed	10th Thu	11th Fri	12th Sat	13th Sun	14th Mon	15th Tue	16th Wed	17th Thu	18th Fri	19th Sat	Events
Ceremonies			OC															CC	
Athletics												4	12	9	8	13			46
Badminton	●	●	●	2	●	●	●	2											4
Basketball								●	●	●	●	●	●	●	●	●	2		2
Beach volleyball				●	●	●	●	●	●	●	●	●	●	●	●	2			2
Boxing					●	●	●	●	●	●	13								13
Cycling									2	2	1	1							6
Football					●	●		●	●		●	●		●		●	2		2
Fencing	2	2	2	3	3														12
Gymnastics	2	2	4	4	4														16
Handball									●	●	●	●	●	●	●	●	●	2	2
Judo												5	5	4					14
Karate				5	●	4													9
Pétanque				●	●	●	●	●											
Swimming					7	8	8	6	6	7									42
Table tennis									●	●	●	●	●	●	●	●	●	●	
Taekwondo															●	8	8		16
Tennis										●	●	●	●	●	●	●	●		
Volleyball	●	●	●	●	●	●	●	●	●	●	●	●	2						2
Weightlifting						●	●	●		●	●								
Wrestling														●	●	●	●		14
Total events	4	4	6	14	14	12	8	8	8	9	14	10	19	13	8	23	8	2	
Cumulative total	4	8	14	28	42	54	62	70	78	87	101	111	130	143	151	174	182	184	
September	2nd Wed	3rd Thu	4th Fri	5th Sat	6th Sun	7th Mon	8th Tue	9th Wed	10th Thu	11th Fri	12th Sat	13th Sun	14th Mon	15th Tue	16th Wed	17th Thu	18th Fri	19th Sat	Events

== Venues ==
Brazzaville		2015 African Games is located in Republic of the Congo
Kintélé Sports Complex		2015 African Games is located in Republic of the Congo
Brazzaville	Brazzaville	2015 African Games is located in Republic of the Congo
Kintele Aquatic Complex; Capacity: 2,000	Palais des Sports; Capacity: 10,134	2015 African Games is located in Republic of the Congo

Venues used in these Games mostly located in the new Kintele Sport Complex in the northern part of Brazzaville and the existing Alphonse Massemba-Débat Sport Complex. The list below shows venues used in these Games.

=== Kintele Sports Complex ===
Venue	Capacity	Sports
Kintele Stadium	60,056	Athletics, Football, Ceremonies
Palais des Sports	10,134	Handball, Karate
Kintele Aquatic Complex	2,000	Swimming
Kintele Tennis Courts	1,000	Tennis
Beach Volleyball Arena		Beach volleyball
Petanque Field		Petanque

=== Other venues ===
Venue	Capacity	Sports
Stade Alphonse Massemba-Débat	17,000	Football
Hall des Pompiers		Pharaons boxing
Gymnase Révolution	3,000	Badminton, Table tennis
Massamba Debat Gymnasium	3,000	Volleyball, Wrestling
Makelekele Gymnasium	3,000	Basketball, Gymnastics
Talangaï Gymnasium	10,000	Boxing, Judo, Taekwondo

== Medal table ==
323 medal events in 20 sports (consists of 2 para sports but excludes 2 demonstration sports).

Key

* Host nation (Congo)

Rank	NOC	Gold	Silver	Bronze	Total
1	Egypt (EGY)	85	64	68	217
2	Nigeria (NGR)	47	55	42	144
3	South Africa (RSA)	41	41	37	119
4	Algeria (ALG)	40	41	36	117
5	Tunisia (TUN)	23	26	41	90
6	Republic of the Congo (CGO)*	8	4	19	31
7	Senegal (SEN)	7	10	19	36
8	Kenya (KEN)	7	9	17	33
9	Cameroon (CMR)	7	8	16	31
10	Ethiopia (ETH)	7	5	10	22
11	Ivory Coast (CIV)	7	4	15	26
12	Namibia (NAM)	5	4	6	15
13	Mauritius (MRI)	5	4	5	14
14	Angola (ANG)	4	3	5	12
14	Seychelles (SEY)	4	3	5	12
16	Libya (LBA)	3	5	8	16
17	Botswana (BOT)	3	4	7	14
18	Eritrea (ERI)	3	1	1	5
19	Zimbabwe (ZIM)	3	0	6	9
20	Ghana (GHA)	2	9	8	19
21	Democratic Republic of the Congo (COD)	2	4	10	16
22	Mali (MLI)	2	1	7	10
23	Rwanda (RWA)	2	0	2	4
24	Mozambique (MOZ)	1	3	2	6
25	Burkina Faso (BUR)	1	1	4	6
26	Uganda (UGA)	1	1	2	4
27	Cape Verde (CPV)	1	1	0	2
28	Niger (NIG)	1	0	1	2
28	Zambia (ZAM)	1	0	1	2
30	Gabon (GAB)	0	3	4	7
31	Benin (BEN)	0	3	2	5
32	Togo (TOG)	0	2	1	3
33	Madagascar (MAD)	0	1	6	7
34	Djibouti (DJI)	0	1	0	1
34	Sudan (SUD)	0	1	0	1
34	The Gambia (GAM)	0	1	0	1
37	Chad (CHA)	0	0	2	2
38	Guinea (GUI)	0	0	1	1
38	Guinea-Bissau (GBS)	0	0	1	1
38	Lesotho (LES)	0	0	1	1
Totals (40 entries)		323	323	418	1,064

== Broadcasters ==
Territory	Broadcaster
Botswana	Botswana TV
Republic of the Congo	TeleCongo
Democratic Republic of the Congo	RTNC
Egypt	ERTU
Sub-Saharan Africa	Canal+ Afrique
Sub-Saharan Africa	SuperSport
Sub-Saharan Africa	Africa 24
Middle East and North Africa	beIN Sports
Senegal	RTS
South Africa	SuperSport
South Africa	SABC
Other countries	BrazzaTV (Website)
