= Atlético Petróleos de Luanda (roller hockey) =

- Full name: Atlético Petróleos de Luanda
- Short name: Petro Atlético
- Founded: 14 January 1980 (45 years ago)
- Arena: Pavilhão da Cidadela, Luanda
- Capacity: 1,500
- President: (Angola) Tomás Faria
- League: 8×Angolan League; 7×Angola Cup; 3×Angola Super Cup
- Club colours
Home	Away

Atlético Petróleos de Luanda is a multisports club from Luanda, Angola. The club's men's roller hockey team competes at local level, at the Luanda Provincial Roller Hockey Championship and at the Angolan Roller Hockey Championship. The roller hockey team of Petro Atlético has been the most titled team in Angola for many years. In recent years, its leadership has been successfully challenged by Juventude de viana, and by Académica de Luanda more recently.

In 2006, the club participated at the first world roller hockey club championship held in Luanda, having been placed 9th among 12 teams. whereas in 2008, in Reus, it ranked 14th among 16 teams.

The club was the runner-up at the 2008 African Roller Hockey Club Championship held in Luanda.

== Honours ==
- Angola Hockey League :
  - Winner (8): 1994, 1999, 2000, 2001, 2002, 2003, 2004, 2005
  - Runner Up (4) : 2006, 2007, 2008, 2011
- Angola Cup :
  - Winner (3): 2004, 2006, 2012
  - Runner Up (9) : 2003, 2007, 2008, 2009, 2010, 2011, 2013, 2014, 2016
- Angola Super Cup :
  - Winner (3): 2006, 2009, 2012
  - Runner Up (3) : 2008, 2013, 2015
- African Champions League :
  - Winner (0):
  - Runner Up (1) : 2008

1980–2016

== Squad ==
Updated as of November 2016

Petro de Luanda Roller Hockey squad
Defenders / Midfielders

 03  Ivan Adão Jó 
 05  Josemar Tavares Zidane
 06  Adão Lococorico Gato Preto 
 09  Sérgio Lococorico Chipico

Forwarders

 07  Airton Barros Geovety
 08  Bráulio Oliveira Xúxu
 11  Agnelo Mango

Goalkeepers

 01  Miguel Vieira
 16  Dorivaldo Francisco Tóre

Technical staff

      Inácio Santos Mama Head Coach 
      Manuel Augusto  Vice Chairman

== Players ==
Petro de Luanda hockey players 2012–2016

Nat	#	Name	Nick	A	P	H.R.	M.T.	Inácio Santos			–
Nat	#	Name	Nick	A	P	2012	2013	2014	2015	2016	2017
Nat	#	Name	Nick	A	P	–	–	–	–	–	–
(Angola)	⋅	Adão Alfredo Lococorico	Gato Preto		D/M	2012	13	13	3	6	⋅
(Angola)	⋅	Afonso Coxe	Mamikua	37	D/M	2012	4	4	⋅	⋅	⋅
(Angola)	⋅	Agnelo Eduardo Mango			FW	⋅	⋅	⋅	8	11	⋅
(Angola)	⋅	Airton Geovany Barros Chiassinanga	Geovety		FW	⋅	⋅	14	7	7	⋅
(Angola)	⋅	Bartolomeu Andrade	Sankara		GK	⋅	⋅	1	⋅	⋅	⋅
(Angola)	⋅	Bráulio António Filipe de Oliveira	Xuxu			⋅	⋅	⋅	⋅	8	⋅
(Angola)	⋅	Bruno			FW	2012	5	⋅	⋅	⋅	⋅
(Angola)	⋅	Chitale			D/M	⋅	⋅	⋅	5	⋅	⋅
(Angola)	⋅	Dorivaldo Aline da Rocha Francisco	Tóre		GK	⋅	⋅	⋅	1	16	⋅
(Angola)	⋅	Francisco Luís	Guedes	17	D/M	2012	11	2	2	⋅	⋅
(Angola)	⋅	Humberto Mendes	Big	21	D/M	2012	8	⋅	⋅	⋅	⋅
(Angola)	⋅	Ivan José dos Santos Adão	Jó			⋅	⋅	⋅	⋅	3	⋅
(Angola)	⋅	Jaime Morais			FW	⋅	⋅	⋅	6	⋅	⋅
(Angola)	⋅	João Zumba	Paizinho	27	FW	2012	7	7	⋅	⋅	⋅
(Angola)	⋅	Josemar da Conceição Tavares	Zidane			⋅	⋅	⋅	⋅	5	⋅
(Angola)	⋅	Márcio Fernandes		28	FW	2012	9	9	9	⋅	⋅
(Angola)	⋅	Miguel Vieira			GK	⋅	⋅	⋅	⋅	1	⋅
(Angola)	⋅	Paulino Quiteque	Chara		D/M	⋅	⋅	6	⋅	⋅	⋅
(Angola)	⋅	Sérgio José Lococorico	Chipico		D/M	⋅	⋅	8	4	9	⋅
(Angola)	⋅	Silvério Quiteque	Pedalé	37	GK	2012	12	12	⋅	⋅	⋅

== Manager history ==
(Angola)	Nelson Costa		–	Jan 2009
(Angola)	Rolf dos Santos		–	Apr 2012
(Angola)	Mateus Torres	Apr 2012	–	May 2012
(Spain)	Humbert Riera	May 2012	–	Jan 2013
(Angola)	Mateus Torres	Jan 2013	–	2014
(Angola)	Inácio Santos Mama	Mar 2014	–

== See also ==
- Petro Atlético Football
- Petro Atlético Basketball
- Petro Atlético Handball
