= C.D. Exército (handball) =

Angola handball club

- Full name: Clube Desportivo do Exército
- Short name: Exército
- Head coach: Domingos Macumbanzi
- League: Angola League; Angola Cup; Angola Super Cup
- Club colours
| Home | Away |

Clube Desportivo do Exército or simply Exército is an Angolan semi-professional club based in Luanda. The club's handball team competes at the local level, at the Luanda Provincial Handball Championship and at the Angola Men's Handball League.

== Honours ==
- National Championship:
  - Winner (0):
  - Runner Up (0) :
- Angola Cup:
  - Winner (0):
  - Runner Up (0) :
- Angola Super Cup:
  - Winner (0):
  - Runner Up (0) :

== Squad ==
Updated as of June 2016

C.D. Exército Handball squad
**Goalkeepers**

 01  Memória Chahua
 23  Edson Contreiras

**Wingers**

 06  Carlos Araújo 
 11  Abemael Francisco 

**Back players**

 04  Augusto Nascimento
 09  Edilson Santos 
 10  Dário Faustino
 14  Cristelson Jordão 
 15  Isaías Ngumbo 190
 13  Enoque André
 16  Kaluala José
 18  Osvaldo Alexandre

- 79 (Angola) Edson Esteves 190
**Line players**

 02  Cleidy Moutinho
 03  Moisés Chamba
 17  João Cafunda

**Technical staff**

      Domingos Macumbanzi Head Coach
      José Ventura Assistant Coach

- Players in **bold** indicate starting lineup

== See also ==
- Federação Angolana de Andebol
