= 2018 Angola Handball Super Cup =

2018 Angola Men's Super Cup
Supertaça de Angola 2017
Interclube	1º de Agosto
Taça Angola	League
20	13
- Date: February 16, 2018
- Venue: Pavilhão da Cidadela, Luanda
- Attendance: 6,000

2018 Angola Women's Super Cup
Supertaça de Angola 2017
Petro Atlético	1º de Agosto
Taça Angola	League
21	19
- Date: February 16, 2018
- Venue: Pavilhão da Cidadela, Luanda
- Attendance: 6,000

The 2018 Angola Handball Super Cup (12th edition) was contested by Primeiro de Agosto, as the 2017 league champion and Interclube, the 2017 cup winner. Interclube won its 6th title.

The 2018 Women's Super Cup (12th edition) was contested by Primeiro de Agosto, the 2017 women's league champion and Petro de Luanda, the 2016 cup winner. Petro Atlético was the winner, making it is's 10th title.

16 February 2018; 19:00	Petro Atlético	21–19	1º de Agosto	Cidadela, Luanda; Referees: Benjamin Tiago, Simão Cumbi
16 February 2018; 19:00	Magda Cazanga 7	(13–12)	Isabel Guialo 5	Cidadela, Luanda; Referees: Benjamin Tiago, Simão Cumbi
16 February 2018; 19:00	2× (yellow card) 4× (suspension) 1× (red card)		1× (yellow card) 2× (suspension)	Cidadela, Luanda; Referees: Benjamin Tiago, Simão Cumbi

Petro Atlético
GK	1	(Angola) Teresa Almeida
GK	22	(Angola) Ivete Simão
CB	2	(Angola) Vilma Nenganga	1/2
–	3	(Angola) Bruna
RW	7	(Angola) Iovânia Quinzole
RW	8	(Angola) Alexandra Chaca
P	13	(Angola) Delfina Mungongo	0/1
B	19	(Angola) Suzeth Cazanga			Suspension
RW	20	(Angola) Marta Santos		Sent off (straight red)
LB	23	(Angola) Azenaide Carlos	5/7
RW	24	(Angola) Joana Costa	4/7	Booked	Suspension
RB	38	(Angola) Marília Quizelete
CB	73	(Angola) Lurdes Monteiro	2/2		Suspension
RB	78	(Angola) Magda Cazanga	7/11
P	98	(Angola) Ríssia Oliveira	2/3	Booked
Coach : (Angola) Vivaldo Eduardo

Stats

Petro Atlético	Statistics	1º de Agosto
21	Goals	19
63	Scoring %	50
3/3	7m penalty	4/6
8 min	Suspensions	4 min
2	Yellow cards	1
1	Red cards	0
15	Turnovers	13
10	Saves	9
	Saving %	

1º de Agosto
GK	16	(Angola) Helena Sousa
GK	20	(Angola) Marta Alberto
B	2	(Angola) Rossana Quitongo
CB	4	(Angola) Helena Paulo	2/6
LW	7	(Angola) Elizabeth Cailo	2/2
CB	10	(Angola) Teresa Leite
P	11	(Angola) Albertina Kassoma	4/6		Suspension
RW	13	(Angola) Joelma Viegas
RW	14	(Angola) Cândida Mundumbo	0/1
B	17	(Angola) Dalva Peres	3/3
RB	19	(Angola) Wuta Dombaxe	0/2	Booked
LB	23	(Democratic Republic of the Congo) Christianne Mwasesa	0/3
RW	86	(Angola) Carolina Morais	2/5
B	88	(Angola) Vivalda Silva	1/1		Suspension
RB	90	(Angola) Isabel Guialo	5/9
Coach : (Denmark) Morten Soubak

== See also ==
- 2017 Angola Women's Handball League
- 2018 Supertaça de Angola (basketball)
