= C.D. Marinha de Guerra de Angola (handball) =

Angolan handball club

- Full name: Clube Desportivo da Marinha de Guerra de Angola
- Short name: ASA
- Arena: Campo do Gama; Pavilhão da Cidadela, Luanda
- Capacity: 1,500
- President: Adm Benevenito Vaz
- Head coach: Filipe Cruz (M); Quinteiro Teresa (W)
- League: Angola League; Angola Super Cup
- Club colours

Clube Desportivo da Marinha de Guerra is a handball club from Luanda, Angola. The club's men's and women's handball teams compete at the local level, at the Luanda Provincial Handball Championship and at the Angola National Handball Championship as well as at continental level, at the annual African Handball Champions League competitions.

The men's team made its debut at the Angolan handball league in 2009 whereas the women's team in 2012.

The club is attached to the Angolan Navy and is an affiliate to C.D. Primeiro de Agosto

== Squad (Men) ==
Updated as of June 2016

Marinha de Guerra Men's Handball squad
**Goalkeepers**

- 01 (Angola) Josualdo Fonseca 20-180-70
- 12 (Angola) Panzo Lemba 23-180-75
- 16 (Angola) Edmilson Gonçalves 23-186-86

**Wingers**

- 03 (Angola) Denilson Dambe 22-190-80
- 07 (Angola) Abiglei Lourenço 22-180-81
- 20 (Angola) Hilário Carlos
**Back players**

- 09 (Angola) Henriques Nhaty 22-182-83
- 10 (Angola) Ênio Sousa 22-190-80
- 14 (Angola) Agostinho Lopes 26-175-78
- 19 (Angola) Sebastião Bartolomeu
- 99 (Angola) Valdemiro Paulo 24-175-74
**Line players**

- 04 (Angola) André Cassoma 24-182-88
- 08 (Angola) Henriques Cassange 22-180-71
- 11 (Angola) Mário Pegado
- 13 (Angola) Aguinaldo Tati -194

**Technical staff**

 

- (Angola) Júlio Caxito Head Coach
- (Angola) Edson Nobre Ass Coach

- Players in **bold** indicate starting lineup

=== Players ===
Marinha de Guerra men's handball players

==== 2011–2017 ====
#	Name	A	P	H	W	Alex Fernandes					J. Caxito																
#	Name	A	P	H	W	11	12	13	14	15	16	17	18														
#	Name	A	P	H	W	11	12	13	14	15	16	17	18	⋅	Abiglei Lourenço	22	W	1.80	81	⋅	⋅	⋅	⋅	2015	7	⋅	⋅
⋅	Agnelo Quitongo	25	P	1.82		⋅	⋅	⋅	2014	⋅	4	⋅	⋅														
⋅	Ariclénio Domingos		P			⋅	⋅	⋅	⋅	2015	13	⋅	⋅														
⋅	Declerck Sibo	22	B	1.90	87	⋅	⋅	⋅	⋅	2015	19	⋅	⋅														
⋅	Denilson Dambe	22	B	1.90	80	⋅	⋅	⋅	⋅	2015	3	⋅	⋅														
⋅	Edmilson Gonçalves	23	GK			⋅	⋅	⋅	2014	⋅	2	⋅	⋅														
⋅	Emílio Socola		–			⋅	⋅	⋅	2014	⋅	⋅	⋅	⋅														
⋅	Ênio Sousa	22	P	1.90	80	⋅	⋅	⋅	⋅	2015	10	⋅	⋅														
⋅	Francisco Almeida Keny		–			⋅	⋅	⋅	⋅	2015	⋅	⋅	⋅														
⋅	Gilberto Figueira Uaué	28	GK	2.00	87	⋅	⋅	⋅	2014	2015	16	⋅	⋅														
⋅	Henriques Cassange	22	B	1.80	71	⋅	⋅	⋅	2014	2015	8	⋅	⋅														
⋅	Henriques Nhaty	22	B	1.90	78	⋅	⋅	⋅	⋅	2015	9	⋅	⋅														
⋅	Hilário Carlos		W			⋅	⋅	⋅	⋅	⋅	20	⋅	⋅														
⋅	Josualdo Fonseca	20	GK	1.80	70	⋅	⋅	⋅	⋅	⋅	1	⋅	⋅														
⋅	Manuel Nascimento Manucho	22	B	1.80	76	⋅	⋅	⋅	⋅	2015	6	→															
⋅	Osvaldo Chilo		W			⋅	⋅	⋅	⋅	2015	14	⋅	⋅														
⋅	Otiniel Pascoal	21	W	1.60	60	⋅	⋅	⋅	⋅	2015	5	→															
⋅	Panzo Lemba	23	GK			⋅	⋅	⋅	⋅	2015	12	⋅	⋅														
⋅	Romualdo Nascimento		–			⋅	⋅	⋅	⋅	2015	11	⋅	⋅														
⋅	Sofrimento Pinto		–			⋅	⋅	⋅	2014	⋅	18	⋅	⋅														

=== Manager history ===
- (Angola) Nelson Catito – 2018
- (Angola) Júlio Caxito – 2016, 2017
- (Ukraine) Victor Tchikoulaev – 2015
- (Portugal) João Florêncio – 2014
- (Angola) Júlio Caxito – 2012

== Squad (Women) ==
Updated as of June 2016

Marinha de Guerra Women's Handball squad
**Goalkeepers**

- 12 (Angola) Cláudia Fumuazuca 26-172-85
- 16 (Angola) Valdemira Van-Dúnem 23-174-95
- 20 (Angola) Swelly Simão 19-170-70

**Wingers**

- 04 (Angola) Florinda Caiango
- 07 (Angola) Sheila Manuel Deusa 27-170
- 09 (Angola) Fernanda João 20-174-61
**Back players**

- 06 (Angola) Lourença Barros
- 10 (Angola) Ngalula Kanka 23-177-68
- 11 (Angola) Tchesa Pemba 21-185-77
- 15 (Angola) Liliana Paixão 28-182-72
- 18 (Angola) Lisandra Salvador 26-178-64
**Line players**

- 03 (Angola) Lidalva de Carvalho 26-169-78
- 05 (Angola) Cristina Vidal
- 14 (Angola) Isabel Eduardo Isa 24-170-64
- 21 (Angola) Antónia Cassoma 22-174-73

**Technical staff**

 

- (Spain) Alfredo Alvarez Head Coach
- (Angola) José Chuma Assist Coach
- (Angola) João Diogo Assist Coach

- Players in **bold** indicate starting lineup

=== Players ===
Marinha de Guerra women's handball players

==== 2011–2017 ====
#	Name	A	P	H	W	–	P.P.	Quinteiro Teresa			A.A.	J.D.	–
#	Name	A	P	H	W	2011	2012	2013	2014	2015	2016	2017	2018
#	Name	A	P	H	W	–	6th	3rd	3rd	3rd	2nd	–	–
10	Alexandra Shunu	21	⋅	⋅	⋅	⋅	⋅	⋅	⋅	⋅	⋅	⋅	2018
1	Amália Pinto		GK	1.68	67	⋅	⋅	⋅	⋅	⋅	1	1	2018
⋅	Antónia Cassoma		P	1.74	73	⋅	⋅	⋅	⋅	⋅	21	⋅	⋅
⋅	Cândida Mundumbo		W	1.68	61	⋅	⋅	⋅	⋅	⋅	13	⋅	⋅
18	Celma Mário	20	B	⋅	⋅	⋅	⋅	⋅	⋅	⋅	⋅	⋅	2018
⋅	Cláudia Fumuazuca		GK	1.72	85	⋅	⋅	⋅	⋅	⋅	12	⋅	⋅
⋅	Cristina Vidal		P			⋅	⋅	⋅	⋅	⋅	5	⋅	2018
⋅	Dalva Peres	20	B	1.75	70	⋅	⋅	⋅	⋅	⋅	2	→	⋅
⋅	Fernanda João		W	1.74	61	⋅	⋅	⋅	⋅	⋅	9	⋅	⋅
⋅	Florinda Caiango		W	1.68	67	⋅	⋅	⋅	⋅	⋅	4	⋅	⋅
⋅	Helena Sousa	20	GK			⋅	⋅	⋅	1	⋅	⋅	⋅	⋅
⋅	Isabel Eduardo Isa	24	P	1.70	64	⋅	⋅	⋅	⋅	⋅	14	⋅	⋅
⋅	Lidalva de Carvalho		P	1.69	78	⋅	⋅	⋅	3	⋅	3	⋅	⋅
⋅	Liliana Paixão	28	B	1.82	72	⋅	⋅	⋅	⋅	⋅	15	⋅	⋅
⋅	Lisandra Salvador	26	B	1.78	64	⋅	⋅	⋅	18	⋅	18	⋅	⋅
⋅	Lourença Barros		B			⋅	⋅	⋅	⋅	⋅	6	⋅	⋅
⋅	Luzia Kiala	18	B	170	62	⋅	⋅	⋅	⋅	⋅	⋅	⋅	2018
⋅	Maravilha Luís		B	1.64	72	⋅	⋅	⋅	–	⋅	⋅	⋅	⋅
⋅	Marta Cadete		–			⋅	⋅	⋅	–	⋅	⋅	⋅	⋅
⋅	Maura Massala		–			⋅	⋅	⋅	9	⋅	⋅	⋅	⋅
⋅	Ngalula Kanka	23	B	1.77	68	⋅	⋅	⋅	⋅	⋅	10	⋅	⋅
⋅	Núria Pacavira		B	1.64	72	⋅	⋅	⋅	2	⋅	⋅	⋅	⋅
4	Ruth João	20	B	1.80	73	⋅	⋅	⋅	⋅	⋅	⋅	⋅	2018
⋅	Sara Luís		B	1.80	58	⋅	⋅	⋅	11	⋅	⋅	⋅	⋅
⋅	Sheila Manuel Deusa		W	1.70		⋅	⋅	⋅	13	⋅	7	⋅	⋅
⋅	Swelly Simão		GK	1.70	70	⋅	⋅	⋅	⋅	⋅	20	⋅	⋅
⋅	Tchesa Pemba	21	B	1.85	77	⋅	⋅	⋅	⋅	⋅	11	⋅	⋅
⋅	Valdemira Van-Dúnem		GK	1.74	95	⋅	⋅	⋅	⋅	⋅	16	⋅	⋅
7	Vera Kiala		⋅	⋅	⋅	⋅	⋅	⋅	⋅	⋅	⋅	⋅	2018
8	Vilma da Silva	21	W	1.77	62	⋅	⋅	⋅	⋅	⋅	8	⋅	2018
⋅	Vivalda Silva	19	B	1.78	72	⋅	⋅	⋅	⋅	⋅	22	⋅	⋅

=== Manager history ===
- (Angola) João Diogo Docas – 2018
- (Spain) Alfredo Alvarez – 2016
- (Angola) Quinteiro Teresa – 2014, 2015
- (Portugal) Pedro Pinto – 2012

== See also ==
- Marinha Basketball
- Federação Angolana de Andebol
