= Atlético Sport Aviação (handball) =

- Full name: Atlético Sport Aviação
- Short name: ASA
- Founded: 1 April 1953; 73 years ago
- Arena: Campo do Gama; Pavilhão da Cidadela, Luanda
- Capacity: 1,500
- President: (Angola) Zeca Venâncio
- Head coach: (Angola) Jesuíno de Carvalho
- League: Angola League 1× Angola Super Cup 1×
- Club colours
Home	Away

Atlético Sport Aviação is a multisports club from Luanda, Angola. The club's women's handball team competes at the local level, at the Luanda Provincial Handball Championship and at the Angola National Handball Championship as well as at continental level, at the annual African Handball Champions League competitions.

== Honours ==
- National Championship:
  - Winner (1): 1999
  - Runner Up (4) : 2001, 2005, 2007, 2008
- Angola Cup:
  - Winner (N/A):
  - Runner Up (3) : 2006, 2007, 2008
- Angola Super Cup :
  - Winner (1): 2007
  - Runner Up (1) : 2009
- CHAB Club Champions Cup:
  - Winner (0):
  - Runner Up (1) : 2007
- CHAB Babacar Fall Super Cup:
  - Winner (0):
  - Runner Up (0) :
- CHAB Cup Winner's Cup:
  - Winner (0):
  - Runner Up (0) :

== Squad ==
Updated as of June 2016

ASA Handball squad
Goalkeepers

* 01  Teresa Tchiweyenge 34-172
* 16  Marta Ventura Arsénia 23-164

Wingers

* 03  Sueli Pombo 
* 06  Celma Chaves 21-162-65
* 09  Magda Cadete 27-174-68
* 19  Voneiti Domingos 21-162

Back players

* 02  Jesiney Mwandanawa 
* 10  Jocelina Yanda Jocy 19-150-58
* 11  Ruth Cambuana 
* 13  Soraya Sacarrolha 
* 18  Filipa Manuel 
* 20  Neusa Mulende 188

Line players

* 07  Luísa Francisco 
* 17  Edvânia Cassange 
* 23  Neusa Muvuma 

Technical staff

*     Albertino de Oliveira Head Coach 
*     Olga Mendes Assistant Coach 

=== Players ===
ASA handball players 2011–2016

#	Name	A	P	H	W	Quinteiro Teresa			J.Carvalho		A.O.	–						
#	Name	A	P	H	W	2011	2012	2013	2014	2015	2016	2017						
#	Name	A	P	H	W	3	3	4	5	7	5	–						
⋅	Anabela David	19	W			3	3	4	5	7	5	⋅	⋅	⋅	19	2015	⋅	⋅
⋅	Astride Palata	20	P	1.80		⋅	⋅	⋅	20	2015	⋅	⋅						
⋅	Carla Ambrósio	11	W			⋅	⋅	2013	11	2015	⋅	⋅						
⋅	Celma Chaves	21	W	162	65	⋅	⋅	⋅	⋅	⋅	6	⋅						
⋅	Constantina Paulo Saldanha	–	P	1.85	74	⋅	⋅	2013	⋅	⋅	⋅	⋅						
⋅	Edith Mbunga	25	P	1.80	75	⋅	⋅	2013	15	2015	15	⋅						
⋅	Edvânia Cassange		P			⋅	⋅	⋅	⋅	⋅	17	⋅						
⋅	Eugênia Domingos Tuchinha	08	B			⋅	⋅	2013	8	2015	⋅	⋅						
⋅	Filipa Manuel		B			⋅	⋅	⋅	⋅	⋅	18	⋅						
⋅	Isabel Farinha Belinha	06	B			⋅	⋅	2013	6	2015	⋅	⋅						
⋅	Jesiney Mwandanawa		B			⋅	⋅	⋅	⋅	⋅	2	⋅						
⋅	Jocelina Yanda	–	B	1.70	68	⋅	⋅	2013	⋅	⋅	⋅	⋅						
⋅	Jocelina Yanda Jocy	19	B	1.50	58	⋅	⋅	⋅	⋅	⋅	10	⋅						
⋅	Liliana Paixão	05	W	1.82	69	⋅	⋅	2013	5	2015	⋅	⋅						
⋅	Luísa Francisco		P			⋅	⋅	2013	7	2015	7	⋅						
⋅	Magda Cadete	27	W	174	68	⋅	⋅	⋅	⋅	⋅	9	⋅						
⋅	Manduala Simão	10	–			⋅	⋅	2013	10	2015	⋅	⋅						
⋅	Marta Ventura Arsénia	23	GK			⋅	⋅	⋅	16	16	16	⋅						
⋅	Mircea Cruz	–	–			⋅	⋅	2013	⋅	⋅	⋅	⋅						
⋅	Natália Alexandre	–	GK			⋅	⋅	2013	√	2015	⋅	⋅						
⋅	Neusa Mulende		B	188		⋅	⋅	⋅	⋅	⋅	20	⋅						
⋅	Neusa Muvuma		P			⋅	⋅	⋅	⋅	⋅	23	⋅						
⋅	Neusa Quimaz	–	–			⋅	⋅	2013	⋅	⋅	⋅	⋅						
⋅	Ngalula Kanka	14	B	1.80	64	⋅	⋅	2013	14	⋅	⋅	⋅						
⋅	Ruth Cambuana		B			⋅	⋅	⋅	⋅	⋅	11	⋅						
⋅	Soraya Sacarrolha		B			⋅	⋅	⋅	⋅	⋅	13	⋅						
⋅	Sueli Pombo		W			⋅	⋅	⋅	⋅	⋅	3	⋅						
⋅	Teresa Chiweyengue	34	172			⋅	⋅	2013	⋅	⋅	1	⋅						
⋅	Voneiti Domingos	21	W	162		⋅	⋅	⋅	⋅	⋅	19	⋅						

== Former Managers ==
(Angola)	Jerónimo Neto Jojó	1998-2000
(Angola)	Beto Ferreira	2001
(Angola)	Fernando Moreira	2002, 2003
(Angola)	Albertino de Oliveira	2007
(Angola)	Quinteiro Teresa	2008-2013
(Angola)	Jesuíno Carvalho	2014-2015
(Angola)	Albertino de Oliveira	2016

== See also ==
- ASA Football
- ASA Basketball
- Federação Angolana de Andebol
