= 2009 African Handball Champions League =

Tournament details
- Host country: Cameroon
- Venue(s): 1 (in 1 host city)
- Dates: October 21–30
- Teams: 11

Final positions
- Champions: (Algeria) GS Pétroliers (11th title)
- Runners-up: (Cameroon) Minuh Yaoundé
- Third place: (Angola) 1º de Agosto
- Fourth place: (Republic of the Congo) Munisport

The 2009 African Handball Champions League was the 31st edition, organized by the African Handball Confederation, under the auspices of the International Handball Federation, the handball sport governing body. The tournament was held from October 21–30 at the Palais des Sports in Yaoundé, Cameroon, contested by 11 teams and won by Groupement Sportif des Pétroliers of Algeria.

== Draw ==
| Group A | Group B | Group C |
|---|---|---|
| (Algeria) GS Pétroliers (Angola) Kabuscorp (Ivory Coast) SOA | (Democratic Republic of the Congo) HC Héritage (Angola) Primeiro de Agosto (Cameroon) Sahel de Douala (Gabon) Stade Mandji | (Gabon) CMS (Cameroon) Minuh Yaoundé (Republic of the Congo) Munisport (Nigeria) Niger United |

== Preliminary round ==
Times given below are in WAT UTC+1.

=== Group A ===
Wed, 21 Oct 2009
| Kabuscorp (Angola) | 24 : 16 | (Ivory Coast) SOA |
Fri, 23 Oct 2009
| SOA (Ivory Coast) | 09 : 30 | (Algeria) GS Pétroliers |
Sun, 25 Oct 2009
| GS Pétroliers (Algeria) | 21 : 20 | (Angola) Kabuscorp |

| Team | Pld | W | D | L | GF | GA | GDIF | Pts |
|---|---|---|---|---|---|---|---|---|
| (Algeria) GS Pétroliers | 2 | 2 | 0 | 0 | 51 | 29 | +22 | 4 |
| (Angola) Kabuscorp | 2 | 1 | 0 | 1 | 44 | 37 | +7 | 2 |
| (Ivory Coast) SOA | 2 | 0 | 0 | 2 | 25 | 54 | -29 | 0 |

=== Group B ===
Thu, 22 Oct 2009
| Stade Mandji (Gabon) | 27 : 22 | (Democratic Republic of the Congo) HC Héritage |
| 1º de Agosto (Angola) | 18 : 16 | (Cameroon) Sahel de Douala |
Sun, 25 Oct 2009
| Sahel de Douala (Cameroon) | 24 : 24 | (Democratic Republic of the Congo) HC Héritage |
| 1º de Agosto (Angola) | 30 : 20 | (Gabon) Stade Mandji |
Mon, 26 Oct 2009
| HC Héritage (Democratic Republic of the Congo) | 27 : 34 | (Angola) 1º de Agosto |
| Sahel de Douala (Cameroon) | 19 : 17 | (Gabon) Stade Mandji |

| Team | Pld | W | D | L | GF | GA | GDIF | Pts |
|---|---|---|---|---|---|---|---|---|
| (Angola) 1º de Agosto | 3 | 3 | 0 | 0 | 82 | 63 | +19 | 6 |
| (Cameroon) Sahel de Douala | 3 | 1 | 1 | 1 | 59 | 59 | 0 | 3 |
| (Gabon) Stade Mandji | 3 | 1 | 0 | 2 | 64 | 71 | -7 | 2 |
| (Democratic Republic of the Congo) HC Héritage | 3 | 0 | 1 | 2 | 73 | 85 | -12 | 1 |

=== Group C ===
Wed, 21 Oct 2009
| Minuh Yaoundé (Cameroon) | 33 : 30 | (Republic of the Congo) Munisport |
| CMS (Gabon) | 10 : 0 | (Nigeria) Niger United |
Fri, 23 Oct 2009
| Munisport (Republic of the Congo) | 27 : 18 | (Gabon) CMS |
| Niger United (Nigeria) | 27 : 31 | (Cameroon) Minuh Yaoundé |
Mon, 26 Oct 2009
| Niger United (Nigeria) | 36 : 42 | (Republic of the Congo) Munisport |
| Minuh Yaoundé (Cameroon) | 26 : 22 | (Gabon) CMS |

| Team | Pld | W | D | L | GF | GA | GDIF | Pts |
|---|---|---|---|---|---|---|---|---|
| (Cameroon) Minuh Yaoundé | 3 | 3 | 0 | 0 | 90 | 70 | +20 | 6 |
| (Republic of the Congo) Munisport | 3 | 2 | 0 | 1 | 99 | 87 | +12 | 4 |
| (Gabon) CMS | 3 | 1 | 0 | 2 | 50 | 53 | -3 | 2 |
| (Nigeria) Niger United | 3 | 0 | 0 | 3 | 63 | 83 | -20 | 0 |

== Knockout stage ==
Championship bracket

Quarter-finals
Tue 27 Oct 2009 –
(Cameroon) Minuh Yaoundé | 29
(Gabon) Stade Mandji | 28
Tue 27 Oct 2009 –
(Algeria) GS Pétroliers | 33
(Gabon) CMS | 26
Tue 27 Oct 2009 –
(Angola) 1º de Agosto | 29
(Cameroon) Sahel de Douala | 24
Tue 27 Oct 2009 –
(Angola) Kabuscorp | 29
(Republic of the Congo) Munisport | 31

Semi-finals
Wed 28 Oct 2009 –
(Algeria) GS Pétroliers | 22
(Angola) 1º de Agosto | 17
Wed 28 Oct 2009 –
(Cameroon) Minuh Yaoundé | 27
(Republic of the Congo) Munisport | 21

Final
Fri 30 Oct 2009 –
(Algeria) GS Pétroliers | 27
(Cameroon) Minuh Yaoundé | 22
Third place
Fri 30 Oct 2009 –
(Angola) 1º de Agosto | 34
(Republic of the Congo) Munisport | 30

5-8th bracket

5–8th place
Wed 28 Oct 2009
Wed 28 Oct 2009

Fifth place
Thu 29 Oct 2009
Seventh place
Thu 29 Oct 2009

9-11th classification

== Final ranking ==
| Rank | Team | Record |
|---|---|---|
| Gold medal | (Algeria) GS Pétroliers | – |
| Silver medal | (Cameroon) Minuh Yaoundé | – |
| Bronze medal | (Angola) Primeiro de Agosto | – |
| 4 | (Republic of the Congo) Munisport | – |
| 5 | | – |
| 6 | | – |
| 7 | | – |
| 8 | | – |
| 9 | | – |
| 10 | | – |
| 11 | | – |

== Awards ==
2009 African Handball Champions Cup Winner

Groupement Sportif des Pétroliers
11th title

Best Player
