= Taça de Angola (roller hockey) =

- Current season, competition or edition: 2015 Angola Roller Hockey Cup
- Sport: Roller Hockey
- Founded: 2005
- Continent: FARS (Africa)
- Most recent champion: Académica de Luanda (2015)
- Most titles: Académica de Luanda (2 titles)

The Angolan Roller Hockey Cup is the second tier roller hockey competition in Angola, following the league. The annual competition is contested by all roller hockey clubs in the country in a head-to-head knock-out format.

== Scores ==
Year	City	Date	Score		
2003	Lobito	22 Nov 2003	ENAMA de Viana	2-1	Petro Atlético
2004	Lubango	27 Nov 2004	Petro Atlético	4-3	Juventude de Viana
2005	Luanda	05 Nov 2005	G.D. Banca	3-3 (1-0 p)	Juventude de Viana
2006	Lobito	18 Nov 2006	Petro Atlético	3-2	Juventude de Viana
2007	Luanda	10 Nov 2007	Juventude de Viana	3-1	Petro Atlético
2008	Benguela	08 Nov 2008	Juventude de Viana	5-3	Petro Atlético
2009	Kuito	14/15 Nov 2009	Juventude de Viana	4-3 8-2	Petro Atlético
2010	Lobito	06/07 Nov 2010	Juventude de Viana	4-4 5-1	Petro Atlético
2011	Lobito	16/17 Feb 2012	Juventude de Viana	2-1 4-0	Petro Atlético
2012	Luanda	13/14 Oct 2012	Petro Atlético	3-2 1-1	Juventude de Viana
2013	Luanda	12 Dec 2013	Juventude de Viana	3-0 4-2 2-0	Petro Atlético
2014	Namibe	02 Nov 2014	Académica de Luanda	4–2	Petro Atlético
2015	Luanda	28 Oct 2015	Académica de Luanda	5–4	Primeiro de Agosto
2016	Luanda	29 Oct 2016	Académica de Luanda	6–2	Petro Atlético
2017	Luanda	11 Nov 2017	Académica de Luanda	9–2	Petro Atlético

== Titles by team ==
Pos	Team	Won	Years won
1	Juventude de Viana	7	2003, 2007, 2008, 2009, 2010, 2011, 2013
2	Académica de Luanda	4	2014, 2015, 2016, 2017
3	Petro Atlético	3	2004, 2006, 2012
4	G.D. Banca	1	2005

== See also ==
- Angola Roller Hockey Super Cup
- Angolan Roller Hockey League
- Supertaça de Angola (football)
- Taça de Angola (basketball)
- Taça de Angola (handball)
