= Supertaça de Angola (roller hockey) =

- Current season, competition or edition: 2016 Angola Roller Hockey SuperCup
- Sport: Roller Hockey
- Founded: 2005
- Continent: FARS (Africa)
- Most recent champion: Académica de Luanda (2017)
- Most titles: Académica de Luanda (5 titles)

The Angolan Roller Hockey SuperCup a.k.a. Supertaça João Garcia is an annual handball competition between the winners of the previous year's league champion and cup. In case the same team happens to win both the league and the cup, the match will be played between the league winner and the cup runner-up.

== Scores ==
Year	City	Date	Score		
2005	Luanda	Feb 26	Juventude de Viana	5–1	Petro de Luanda
2006	Luanda	Jan 25	Petro de Luanda	8–5	Desportivo da Banca
2007			not played		
2008	Luanda	Mar 19	Juventude de Viana	3–2	Petro de Luanda
2009	Luanda	Feb 07	Petro de Luanda	3–2	Juventude de Viana
2010	Luanda	Mar 07	Académica de Luanda	5–2	Juventude de Viana
2011			Juventude de Viana	–	Académica de Luanda
2012	Luanda	Apr 27	Petro de Luanda	3–2	Juventude de Viana
2013		Mar 9/10	Académica de Luanda	7–2 6–4	Petro de Luanda
2014	Malanje	Mar 29/30	Juventude de Viana	2–1 3–2	Académica de Luanda
2015	Luanda	Apr 16	Académica de Luanda	7–2	Petro de Luanda
2016	Luanda	July 1	Académica de Luanda	4–2	Primeiro de Agosto
2017	Luanda	Mar 25	Académica de Luanda	6–5 (pen)	Primeiro de Agosto

== Titles by team ==
Pos	Team	Won	Years won
1	Académica de Luanda	5	2010, 2013, 2015, 2016, 2017
2	Juventude de Viana	4	2005, 2008, 2011, 2014
3	Petro de Luanda	3	2006, 2009, 2012

== See also ==
- Angola Roller Hockey Cup
- Angolan Roller Hockey League
- Supertaça de Angola (football)
- Supertaça de Angola (basketball)
- Supertaça de Angola (handball)
