= 2010 African Roller Hockey Club Championship =

2010 Roller Hockey Africa Club Cup
FARS Club African Cup South Africa 2010

Tournament details
- Host country: South Africa
- Dates: 20–24 July
- Teams: 8 (from 1 confederation)
- Venue(s): 1 (in 1 host city)

Final positions
- Champions: Académica de Luanda (1st title)
- Runners-up: Juventude de Viana
- Third place: Maxaquene
- Fourth place: Estrela Vermelha

Tournament statistics
- Matches played: 20
- Goals scored: 189 (9.45 per match)

The III African Roller Hockey Club Championship was the 3rd edition of the African Roller Hockey Club Championship organized by FARS. It was held in July 2010 in Pretoria, South Africa.

This was the first time in 15 years that Egypt had teams to participate.

The winner, of this tournament, Académica de Luanda, will be present in the most important Club Championship of Roller Hockey, Rink hockey World Club Championship to be held probably in Portugal or Egypt in 2010.

== Teams ==
The clubs which participated in this Championship were:

Country	Team to participate
South Africa	Associação da Comunidade Portuguesa de Pretoria
South Africa	União Cultural Desportiva e Recreativa de Joanesburgo
Angola	Académica de Luanda
Angola	Juventude de Viana
Mozambique	Maxaquene
Mozambique	Estrela Vermelha de Maputo
Egypt	AL-Dakhlyea Sporting Club
South Africa	Invitation

== Results ==
The Results of the Africa Cup were

=== Group A ===
Team	Pts	Pld	W	D	L	GF	GA
(Angola) Académica de Luanda	9	3	3	0	0	24	7
(Mozambique) Maxaquene	4	3	1	1	1	12	6
(South Africa) ACP de Pretória	3	3	1	0	1	10	10
(South Africa) Invitation Club	1	3	0	1	2	11	27

20 July 2010	ACP de Pretória (South Africa)	8-2	(South Africa) Invitation	Pretoria
20:30 (UTC+02)

21 July 2010	ACP de Pretória (South Africa)	2-8	(Mozambique) Maxaquene	Pretoria
17:30 (UTC+02)

21 July 2010	Invitation (South Africa)	3-15	(Angola) Académica de Luanda	Pretoria
19:00 (UTC+02)

22 July 2010	Académica de Luanda (Angola)	5-1	(Mozambique) Maxaquene	Pretoria
11:00 (UTC+02)

22 July 2010	Invitation (South Africa)	4-4	(Mozambique) Maxaquene	Pretoria
17:30 (UTC+02)

22 July 2010	ACP de Pretória (South Africa)	3-4	(Angola) Académica de Luanda	Pretoria
20:30 (UTC+02)

=== Group B ===
Team	Pts	Pld	W	D	L	GF	GA
(Angola) Juventude de Viana	9	3	3	0	0	40	7
(Mozambique) Estrela Vermelha	4	3	1	1	1	12	22
(Egypt) AL-Dakhlyea SC	4	3	1	1	1	10	20
(South Africa) União de Joanesburgo	0	3	0	0	3	5	10

20 July 2010	AL-Dakhlyea Sporting Club (Egypt)	4-3	(South Africa) União de Joanesburgo	Pretoria
18:00 (UTC+02)

21 July 2010	AL-Dakhlyea Sporting Club (Egypt)	4-4	(Mozambique) Estrela Vermelha	Pretoria
16:00 (UTC+02)

21 July 2010	União de Joanesburgo (South Africa)	3-11	(Angola) Juventude de Viana	Pretoria
20:30 (UTC+02)

22 July 2010	Juventude de Viana (Angola)	16-2	(Mozambique) Estrela Vermelha	Pretoria
10:00 (UTC+02)

22 July 2010	Juventude de Viana (Angola)	13-2	(Egypt) AL-Dakhlyea Sporting Club	Pretoria
16:00 (UTC+02)

22 July 2010	União de Joanesburgo (South Africa)	2-6	(Mozambique) Estrela Vermelha	Pretoria
19:00 (UTC+02)

=== Final four ===
Semi-finals
23 July - Pretoria
Académica de Luanda	14
Estrela Vermelha	1
23 July - Pretoria
Maxaquene	1
Juventude de Viana	9

Final
24 July - Pretoria
Académica de Luanda	3
Juventude de Viana	2
Third place
24 July - Pretoria
Estrela Vermelha	6
Maxaquene	14

=== Semifinals ===
23 July 2010	Académica de Luanda (Angola)	16-1	(Mozambique) Estrela Vermelha	Pretoria
19:00 (UTC+02)

23 July 2010	Maxaquene (Mozambique)	1-9	(Angola) Juventude de Viana	Pretoria
20:30 (UTC+02)

=== Final 3rd and 4th ===
24 July 2010	Estrela Vermelha (Mozambique)	6-14	(Mozambique) Maxaquene	Pretoria
15:00 (UTC+02)

=== Final ===
24 July 2010	Académica de Luanda (Angola)	3-2	(Angola) Juventude de Viana	Pretoria
16:30 (UTC+02)

== Final classification ==
Rank	Team
1st	(Angola) Académica de Luanda
2nd	(Angola) Juventude de Viana
3rd	(Mozambique) Maxaquene
4th	(Mozambique) Estrela Vermelha de Maputo
5th	(South Africa) A.C.P. de Pretoria
6th	(Egypt) AL-Dakhlyea Sporting Club
7th	(South Africa) U.C.D.R. de Joanesburgo
8th	(South Africa) Invitation
