= Astride Palata =

Congolese handball player

Personal information
- Nationality: Congolese
- Born: 14 November 1982 (age 43)
- Height: 1.80 m (5 ft 11 in)

Sport
- Sport: Handball
- Position: Pivot

Senior clubs
- Years: Team
- -2015: Primeiro de Agosto
- 2015-2016: AS Aviacao
National team
- Years: Team
- –: DR Congo

Astride Palata (born 14 November 1982) is a Congolese former handball player. She played for the Angolan clubs Primeiro de Agosto and AS Aviacao. She was also member of the DR Congo national team, where she competed at the 2015 World Women's Handball Championship in Denmark.
