= C.D. Primeiro de Agosto (roller hockey) =

Angolan roller hockey club

Primeiro de Agosto hóquei
- Full name: Clube Desportivo Primeiro de Agosto
- League: Campeonato Nacional
- Founded: August 1, 1979 (46 years ago)
- Home ground: Pavilhão da Cidadela; Pavilhão do Dream Space, Luanda (Capacity 1,500)

Personnel
- Chairman: Carlos Hendrick
- Manager: António Gaspar
- Website: www.primeiroagosto.com
Home	Away

The Clube Desportivo Primeiro de Agosto is a multisports club from Luanda, Angola. The club's men's roller hockey team competes at the local level, at the Luanda Provincial Roller Hockey Championship and at the Angolan Roller Hockey Championship.

== Honours ==
- Angola Hockey League:
  - Winner (2): 1988, 2015
  - Runner Up (1) : 2014
- Angola Cup:
  - Winner (n/a):
  - Runner Up (1) : 2015
- Angola Super Cup:
  - Winner (n/a):
  - Runner Up (2) : 2016, 2017

== Squad ==
Updated as of July 2016

Primeiro de Agosto Roller Hockey squad
Defenders / Midfielders

 02  Sílvio Marques Kiza (C)
 03  Afonso Coxe Mamikua 39
 04  Walter Bernardo Mizé
 16  João Zumba Paizinho 29
 18  Rui Miguel 34

Forwarders

 05  Eusébio João Tiquinho
 06  José Cardoso Zé das Botas
 07  Anderson Silva Nery 24
 08  Júlio Martins Jujú
 19  Rui André 34

Goalkeepers

 01  Estevão Dala
 10  Ricardo Cunha 

Technical staff

      I. Santos Mama Head Coach 
      Nelson Mariano  Assistant Coach
      Nelson Costa Head of Dept

== Players ==
Primeiro de Agosto hockey players 2012–2017

Nat	#	Name	Nick	A	P	António Gaspar					I.S.
Nat	#	Name	Nick	A	P	2012	2013	2014	2015	2016	2017
Nat	#	Name	Nick	A	P	–	–	–	–	–	–
(Angola)	⋅	Afonso Coxe	Mamikua	39	D/M	⋅	⋅	?	?	3	⋅
(Angola)	⋅	Anderson Silva	Nery	23	FW	⋅	5	13	7	7	⋅
(Angola)	⋅	António Gaspar	Toy Gaspar	38	FW	2012	⋅	⋅	⋅	⋅	⋅
(Angola)	⋅	Bernardo Costa	Nary		GK	⋅	⋅	⋅	⋅	⋅	⋅
(Angola)	⋅	Bettencourt de Carvalho	Bicas		FW	2012	⋅	8	8	⋅	⋅
(Angola)	⋅	Carlos Louro	Canhé		D/M	⋅	⋅	3	3	⋅	⋅
(Angola)	⋅	Edgar Chaves	Kwenha		D/M	2012	7	7	?	⋅	⋅
(Angola)	⋅	Estevão Dala	–		GK	⋅	⋅	⋅	⋅	1	⋅
(Angola)	⋅	Eusébio João	Tiquinho		FW	2012	⋅	5	5	5	⋅
(Angola)	⋅	Gerson Quintas	Geny		FW	⋅	⋅	9	9	⋅	⋅
(Angola)	⋅	Jaime Dudão	–		GK	2012	⋅	⋅	⋅	⋅	⋅
(Angola)	⋅	João Zumba	Paizinho	28	D/M	⋅	⋅	?	17	16	⋅
(Angola)	⋅	José Cardoso	Zé das Botas		FW	2012	6	6	6	6	⋅
(Angola)	⋅	Júlio Martins	Jujú		FW	2012	8	⋅	⋅	8	⋅
(Angola)	⋅	Milton Lucas	Mitó	26	GK	2012	⋅	⋅	1	⋅	⋅
(Portugal)	⋅	Ricardo Cunha	–	37	GK	⋅	10	10	10	10	⋅
(Angola)	⋅	Rui André	–	34	FW	⋅	⋅	⋅	⋅	19	⋅
(Angola)	⋅	Rui Miguel	–	34	D/M	⋅	⋅	⋅	⋅	18	⋅
(Angola)	⋅	Sílvio Marques	Kiza		D/M	2012	2	2	2	2	⋅
(Angola)	⋅	Tomás Silva	–		D/M	2012	3	⋅	⋅	⋅	⋅
(Angola)	⋅	Victorino Gonçalves	Kaká		D/M	2012	14	⋅	⋅	⋅	⋅
(Angola)	⋅	Walter Bernardo	Mizé		D/M	2012	⋅	4	4	4	⋅

== Manager history ==
(Angola)	Mário Jorge Malungo		–	Oct 2010
(Portugal)	António Gaspar	Oct 2010	–
(Angola)	Inácio Santos Mama	Jun 2017	–

== See also ==
- Primeiro de Agosto Football
- Primeiro de Agosto Basketball
- Primeiro de Agosto Handball
- Primeiro de Agosto Volleyball
- Federação Angolana de Andebol
