= Alexandre Machado =

Angolan handball coach

Personal information
- Full name: Alexandre Diogo Machado
- Nationality: Angolan
- Born: Luanda, Angola

Sport
- Sport: Handball
- Position: Head coach
- Current club: Interclube

Alexandre Diogo Machado, nicknamed Careca, is an Angolan handball coach for Angolan handball club Interclube and the Angolan national team.

He coached the team at the 2017 World Men's Handball Championship.
