= Julião Gaspar =

Angolan handball player

Personal information
- Full name: Julião Francisco Gaspar
- Nationality: Angolan
- Born: 28 March 1990 (age 36)
- Height: 1.90 m (6 ft 3 in)

Sport
- Sport: Handball
- Position: Goalkeeper
- Current club: Interclube
- Number: 16
National team
Years	Team	Apps	(Gls)
–	Angola	5	(0)
Medal record
African Championship
Bronze medal – third place	Egypt 2016

Julião Francisco Gaspar, nicknamed Vermelhinho, (born 28 March 1990) is an Angolan handball player for Interclube and the Angolan national team.

He participated at the 2017 World Men's Handball Championship.
