= Rink hockey World Club Championship =

Roller Hockey Championship

The Rink Hockey World Club Championship is a worldwide competition for the best roller hockey teams in the world.

The first format of this competition was sanctioned by the International Rink Hockey Committee and was named as CIRH Roller Hockey World Club Championship. This competition was only held twice, in 2006, at Luanda, Angola and for the second and last time in 2008, at Reus, Spain, being discontinued in favor of the Intercontinental Cup.

In 2025, the World Skate returned with the Rink Hockey Clubs World Championship, replacing the Roller Hockey Intercontinental Cup. The first edition of this new format was held in Estadio Aldo Cantoni, in San Juan, Argentina

== History ==
Edition	Year	Location	(gold) Gold	(silver) Silver	(bronze) Bronze
I	2006	Luanda, Angola	(Italy) Hockey Bassano	(Spain) Reus Deportiu	(Portugal) SL Benfica
II	2008	Reus, Spain	(Spain) Reus Deportiu	(Spain) FC Barcelona	(Italy) Hockey Bassano
III	2025	San Juan, Argentina	(Portugal) Sporting CP	(Spain) FC Barcelona	(Portugal) Óquei Clube de Barcelos

=== Winners by Team ===
Team	Winners	Runners-up	Third Place
(Spain) Reus Deportiu	1 (2008)	1 (2006)	0
(Italy) Hockey Bassano	1 (2006)	0	1 (2008)
(Portugal) Sporting CP	1 (2025)	0	0
(Spain) FC Barcelona	0	2 (2008, 2025)	0
(Portugal) SL Benfica	0	0	1 (2006)
(Portugal) Óquei Clube de Barcelos	0	0	1 (2025)

=== Winners by Country ===
Country	Winners	Runners-up	Third Place
Spain	1	3	0
Portugal	1	0	2
Italy	1	0	1
