= Kabuscorp S.C.P. (handball) =

- Full name: Kabuscorp S.C.P.
- Short name: Kabuscorp
- Founded: January 1, 1994; 32 years ago
- Arena: Campo do Gama; Pavilhão Anexo, Luanda
- Capacity: 1,500
- President: Bento Kangamba
- Head coach: Pedro Neto (W)
- League: 2× Angola League; 2× Angola Cup; 1× Angola Super Cup
- Club colours
| Home | Away |

Kabuscorp S.C.P. is a sports club from Luanda, Angola. The men's and women's handball teams compete at the Luanda Provincial Handball Championships and at the Angola National Handball Championships as well as at continental level, at the annual African Handball Champions League competitions.

== Men's ==
=== Honours ===
- National Championship:
  - Winner (2): 2009, 2010
  - Runner Up (3) : 2008, 2011, 2012
- Angola Cup:
  - Winner (0):
  - Runner Up (0) :
- Angola Super Cup:
  - Winner (1): 2010
  - Runner Up (0) :
- CHAB Club Champions Cup:
  - Winner (0):
  - Runner Up (0) :
- CHAB Cup Winner's Cup:
  - Winner (0):
  - Runner Up (0) :

=== Squad ===
Updated as of 2013

2013 Kabuscorp Men's Handball roster (4th)
| Goalkeepers: (Angola) Pedro Neto 37-188-102; Wingers: (Portugal) Paulo Silva; Line players: (Argentina) Martin Daldoa; (Angola) Inocêncio Tamba 20-190-87 | Back players: (Angola) Bedilson; (Angola) Quipita; Other players: (Angola) Paulo Pereira; Technical staff: (Angola) Roberto Talaya Assistant Coach; (Angola) João Pedro Judy Head of Dept |

=== Manager history ===
| (Angola) | José Augusto | 2008 |
| (Angola) | José Pereira Kidó | 2009, 2010 |
| (Bulgaria) | Nicolae Pirgov | 2011, 2012 |

== Women ==
=== Squad ===
Updated as of 2014

Kabuscorp Women's Handball squad (8th)
| Goalkeepers: 01 (Angola) Maria Mpeva Mena; 12 (Angola) Teresa Buba; 16 (Angola) Míriam; Wingers: 04 (Angola) Tatiana Tati; 07 (Angola) Bebucha; 13 (Angola) Soraya; Line players: 02 (Angola) Patrícia Santos | Back players: 05 (Angola) Morla Miguel; 08 (Angola) Neusa; 10 (Angola) Antónia Dias Vieira Dias; 14 (Angola) Jeovânia António Buchinha; 15 (Angola) Filipa Manuel; Other players: 03 (Angola) Cláudia; 06 (Angola) Ana Mário; 09 (Angola) Maria; 11 (Angola) Catarina Caty; Technical staff: (Angola) Pedro Neto Head Coach; (Angola) João Pedro Judy Head of Dept |

== Former squads ==
=== 2013 squad (men) ===
| Nat | No | Name | Age | H | W | Pos |
|---|---|---|---|---|---|---|
| (Angola) | | Edson Faustino Colita | 32 | 177 | 79 | GK |
| (Angola) | | Pedro Neto | 37 | 188 | 102 | GK |
| (Angola) | | Yuri Fernandes | 29 | 184 | 77 | LB |
| (Angola) | | André Cassapi Matos | 29 | | | CB |
| (Angola) | | Quipita | | | | CB |
| (Angola) | | Bedilson | | | | B |
| (Argentina) | | Martin Daldoa | | | | P |
| (Portugal) | | Paulo Silva | | | | W |
| (Angola) | | Francisco Marçal | 34 | 185 | 77 | W |
| (Angola) | | Inocêncio Tamba | 20 | 190 | 87 | P |
| (Angola) | | Paulo Pereira | | | | |

| Nat | Name | Position |
|---|---|---|
| (Angola) | João Pedro Judy | Head of Handball Dept |
| (Angola) | Francisco Marçal | Head Coach |
| (Angola) | J. Roberto Talaya | Assistant Coach |

== See also ==
- Kabuscorp Football
- Angolan Handball Federation
