= Yaroslav Aguiar =

Angolan handball player

Personal information
- Full name: Yaroslav Catraio João de Aguiar
- Nationality: Angolan
- Born: 11 June 1985 (age 41)
- Height: 2.00 m (6 ft 6 1/2 in)

Sport
- Sport: Handball
- Position: Pivot
- Current club: Interclube
- Number: 20
National team
Years	Team	Apps	(Gls)
–	Angola	2	(0)

Yaroslav Catraio João de Aguiar, nicknamed Jaro, (born 11 June 1985) is an Angolan handball player for Interclube and the Angolan national team.

He participated at the 2017 World Men's Handball Championship.
