= Angola Men's Handball League =

- No. of teams: 7
- Country: Angola
- Most recent champion: Primeiro de Agosto (2016)
- Most titles: Primeiro de Agosto (26)

The Angolan Men's Handball League is the top tier handball competition in Angola.

== Summary ==
Year	City	Date	Final			Third-place game		
Year	City	Date	Champion	Score	Second Place	Third Place	Score	Fourth Place
2001	Namibe	Aug 26–Sep 05	Sporting de Luanda	^{r/r}	Primeiro de Agosto	G.D. Banca	^{r/r}	Sporting do Namibe
2002	Luanda	Oct 12–23	Sporting de Luanda	28-27 27-35 26-25	Primeiro de Agosto	G.D. Banca	48-29	Sporting do Namibe
2003	Luanda	Oct 25–Nov 05	Primeiro de Agosto	^{r/r}	Sporting de Luanda	G.D. Banca	^{r/r}	Desportivo do Bengo
2004	Luanda	Oct 24–Nov 07	Primeiro de Agosto	^{r/r}	Sporting de Luanda	G.D. Banca	^{r/r}	Dami do Lobito
2005	Lobito	Jul 01–12	Primeiro de Agosto	^{r/r}	G.D. Banca	Sporting de Luanda	^{r/r}	ZAC Catumbela
2006	Luanda	Jul 11–22	G.D. Banca	28-27 24-20	Primeiro de Agosto	Sporting de Luanda	22-26 23-20	Misto de Benguela
2007	Luanda	Aug 31–Set 14	Primeiro de Agosto	26-16	G.D. Banca	Kabuscorp	n/a	Sporting de Luanda
2008	Luanda	Sep 23–Oct 03	Primeiro de Agosto	22-16 27-18	Kabuscorp	G.D. Banca	28-26	Sporting de Luanda
2009	Kuito	Sep 01–Jul 09	Kabuscorp	19-18 22-23 19-17	Primeiro de Agosto	Interclube	27-26 29-25	Sporting de Luanda
2010	Luena	Sep 17–26	Kabuscorp	29-28	Interclube	Primeiro de Agosto	xx-xx	Sporting de Luanda
2011	Luanda	Jun 26–Jul 08	Primeiro de Agosto	29-27 21-19	Kabuscorp	Interclube	xx-xx xx-xx	Ferroviário de Luanda
2012	Benguela	Jun 07–15	Primeiro de Agosto	5-2 4-1 29-24	Kabuscorp	Interclube	32-20 xx-xx	Marinha
2013	Lobito	Jun 20–29	Primeiro de Agosto	^{r/r}	Interclube	Marinha	^{r/r}	Petro de Luanda
2014	Luanda	Aug 28–Sep 7	Petro de Luanda	^{r/r}	Primeiro de Agosto	Interclube	^{r/r}	Marinha
2015	Luanda	Jun 18–27	Primeiro de Agosto	23-19 24-18	Interclube	Petro de Luanda	34-21	Marinha
2016	Luanda	Jun 14–25	Primeiro de Agosto	21-19	Interclube	Marinha	34-24	Petro de Luanda
2017	Luanda	Jun 18–27						
2018	Luanda	Jul 25–						

^r/r Round robin tournament.

== Participation details ==
Club
Club	2001	2002	2003	2004	2005	2006	2007	2008	2009	2010	2011	2012	2013	2014	2015	2016	2017	2018	
	4	4	4	5	4	4	5	5	7	8	7	5	5	5	6	7	–	–	
Desportivo da Banca	3 2001	3 2002	3 2003	3 2003	2 2005	1 2006	2 2007	3 2008	⋅	⋅	⋅	⋅	⋅	⋅	⋅	⋅	⋅	⋅	x
Desportivo do Bengo	⋅	⋅	4	⋅	⋅	⋅	⋅	⋅	⋅	⋅	⋅	⋅	⋅	⋅	⋅	⋅	⋅	⋅	1
Exército	⋅	⋅	⋅	⋅	⋅	⋅	⋅	⋅	⋅	⋅	⋅	⋅	⋅	⋅	⋅	7	⋅	⋅	1
Ferroviário de Luanda	⋅	⋅	⋅	⋅	⋅	⋅	⋅	⋅	⋅	?	4	⋅	⋅	⋅	⋅	⋅	⋅	⋅	x
Interclube	⋅	⋅	⋅	⋅	⋅	⋅	⋅	⋅	3 2009	2 2010	3 2011	3 2012	2 2013	3 2014	2 2015	2 2016	⋅	⋅	5
Kabuscorp	⋅	⋅	⋅	⋅	⋅	⋅	3 2007	2 2008	1 2009	1 2010	2 2011	2 2012	4	⋅	⋅	⋅	⋅	⋅	7
Marinha de Guerra	⋅	⋅	⋅	⋅	⋅	⋅	⋅	⋅	?	⋅	5	4	3 2013	4	4	3 2016	⋅	⋅	3
Marítimo de Benguela	⋅	⋅	⋅	⋅	⋅	⋅	⋅	⋅	⋅	⋅	⋅	5	⋅	⋅	⋅	⋅	⋅	⋅	1
Misto da Huíla	⋅	⋅	⋅	⋅	⋅	⋅	⋅	⋅	⋅	?	⋅	⋅	⋅	⋅	⋅	⋅	⋅	⋅	1
Misto de Benguela	⋅	⋅	⋅	⋅	⋅	4	⋅	5	⋅	?	7	⋅	⋅	⋅	⋅	⋅	⋅	⋅	4
Misto do Bengo	⋅	⋅	⋅	5	⋅	⋅	⋅	⋅	⋅	?	⋅	⋅	⋅	⋅	⋅	⋅	⋅	⋅	1
Misto do Bié	⋅	⋅	⋅	⋅	⋅	⋅	⋅	⋅	6	⋅	⋅	⋅	⋅	⋅	⋅	⋅	⋅	⋅	1
Misto de Cabinda	⋅	⋅	⋅	⋅	⋅	⋅	⋅	⋅	⋅	⋅	⋅	⋅	⋅	⋅	6	6	⋅	⋅	2
Misto de Catoca	⋅	⋅	⋅	⋅	⋅	⋅	⋅	⋅	5	⋅	⋅	⋅	⋅	⋅	⋅	⋅	⋅	⋅	1
Petro de Luanda	⋅	⋅	⋅	⋅	⋅	⋅	⋅	⋅	⋅	⋅	⋅	⋅	5	1 2014	3 2015	4	⋅	⋅	1
Primeiro de Agosto	2 2001	2 2002	1 2003	1 2004	1 2005	2 2006	1 2007	1 2008	2 2009	3 2010	1 2011	1 2012	1 2013	2 2014	1 2015	1 2016	⋅	⋅	x
Progresso da Lunda Sul	⋅	⋅	⋅	⋅	⋅	⋅	⋅	⋅	⋅	⋅	⋅	⋅	⋅	5	5	5	⋅	⋅	3
Sporting de Luanda	1 2001	1 2002	2 2003	2 2004	3 2005	3 2006	4	4	4	4	6	⋅	⋅	⋅	⋅	⋅	⋅	⋅	x
Sporting do Namibe	4	4	⋅	⋅	⋅	⋅	⋅	⋅	⋅	⋅	⋅	⋅	⋅	⋅	⋅	⋅	⋅	⋅	2
UD do Kwanza Norte	⋅	⋅	⋅	⋅	⋅	⋅	5	⋅	⋅	⋅	⋅	⋅	⋅	⋅	⋅	⋅	⋅	⋅	1
ZAC da Catumbela	⋅	⋅	⋅	⋅	4	⋅	⋅	⋅	⋅	⋅	⋅	⋅	⋅	⋅	⋅	⋅	⋅	⋅	1
# Participants	4	4	4	5	4	4	5	5	7	8	7	5	5	5	6	7	7	7	

== Titles per club ==
Men

Team	Won	Years won
Primeiro de Agosto	26	1980, 1981, 1982, 1983, 1984, 1986, 1987, 1991, 1992, 1993, 1994, 1995, 1996, 1998, 2000, 2002, 2003, 2004, 2005, 2007, 2008, 2011, 2012, 2013, 2015, 2016
Petro de Luanda	2	1985, 2014
Kabuscorp	2	2009, 2010
Desportivo da Banca	2	1997, 2006
Sporting de Luanda	2	1999, 2001
Dínamos	1	1990
Interclube	1	1989
Belenenses F.C.	1	1979

== See also ==
- Federação Angolana de Andebol
- Angola men's national handball team
- Taça de Angola
- Supertaça de Angola
