= Nestor Kinanga =

Angolan handball player

Personal information
- Full name: Nestor Simão Kinanga
- Nationality: Angolan
- Born: 23 September 1988 (age 38)
- Height: 1.70 m (5 ft 7 in)

Sport
- Sport: Handball
- Position: Left wing
- Current club: Interclube
- Number: 13
National team
Years	Team	Apps	(Gls)
–	Angola	2	(0)

Nestor Simão Kinanga (born 23 September 1988) is an Angolan handball player for Interclube and the Angolan national team.

He participated at the 2017 World Men's Handball Championship.
