= 2008 Rink hockey World Club Championship =

Tournament details
- Host country: Spain
- City: Reus
- Dates: 22 September 2008–28 September 2008
- Teams: 16

Final positions
- Champions: (Spain) Reus Deportiu (1st title)
- Runner-up: (Spain) FC Barcelona
- Third place: (Italy) Bassano Hockey 54

Tournament statistics
- Matches played: 38
- Goals scored: 253 (6.66 per match)

The 2008 Rink hockey World Club Championship was the (second edition) of the Rink hockey World Club Championship and took place in Reus, Spain from September 22 to 28, 2008.

== Format ==
16 teams from 10 different countries participated. The teams were divided into 4 groups of four teams each. The top two teams of each group advanced to the semifinals. The teams that didn't advance to the final stage played the classification knockout rounds.

== Teams participating ==
Africa:

(Angola) Juventude de Viana
(Angola) Petro de Luanda

Europe:

(Germany) ERG Iserlohn
(Spain) Liceo La Coruña
(Spain) FC Barcelona
(Spain) Reus Deportiu
(France) HC Quévert
(Italy) ASH Valdagno
(Italy) Bassano Hockey 54
(Portugal) Oliveirense
(Portugal) O.C. Barcelos
(Switzerland) RHC Wimmis

North America:

(United States) Decatur HC

South America:

(Argentina) Centro Valenciano
(Argentina) Concepción PC
(Brazil) SC Recife

== Draw ==
Group A	Group B	Group C	Group D
(Argentina) Concepción PC (Germany) ERG Iserlohn (Spain) Liceo La Coruña (Brazil) SC Recife	(Portugal) O.C. Barcelos (Spain) FC Barcelona (Argentina) Centro Valenciano (Angola) Petro de Luanda	(United States) Decatur HC (Spain) Reus Deportiu (Italy) ASH Valdagno (Switzerland) RHC Wimmis	(Italy) Bassano Hockey 54 (Angola) Juventude de Viana (Portugal) Oliveirense (France) HC Quévert

== Group stage ==
All times Central European Time (UTC+1)

=== Group A ===
Day	Hour		Score
22 September	15:30	Concepción (Argentina)	5–2	(Brazil) SC Recife
	17:00	Liceo La Coruña (Spain)	7–1	(Germany) ERG Iserlohn
23 September	15:30	Concepción (Argentina)	3–4	(Spain) Liceo La Coruña
	18:00	SC Recife (Brazil)	1–5	(Germany) ERG Iserlohn
24 September	15:30	ERG Iserlohn (Germany)	2–6	(Argentina) Concepción
	17:00	Liceo La Coruña (Spain)	16–1	(Brazil) SC Recife

Pos	Team	Pld	W	D	L	GF	GA	GD	Pts
1	(Spain) Liceo La Coruña	3	3	0	0	27	5	+22	9
2	(Argentina) Concepción	3	2	0	1	21	7	+14	6
3	(Germany) ERG Iserlohn	3	1	0	2	8	14	−6	3
3	(Brazil) SC Recife	3	0	0	3	3	33	−30	0

=== Group B ===
Day	Hour		Score
22 September	09:00	Petro de Luanda (Angola)	0–5	(Argentina) Centro Valenciano
	20:00	FC Barcelona (Spain)	0–0	(Portugal) O.C. Barcelos
23 September	12:00	Petro de Luanda (Angola)	1–3	(Portugal) O.C. Barcelos
	18:30	Centro Valenciano (Argentina)	0–4	(Spain) FC Barcelona
24 September	09:00	O.C. Barcelos (Portugal)	1–5	(Argentina) Centro Valenciano
	18:30	FC Barcelona (Spain)	4–2	(Angola) Petro de Luanda

Pos	Team	Pld	W	D	L	GF	GA	GD	Pts
1	(Spain) FC Barcelona	3	2	1	0	8	2	+6	7
2	(Argentina) Centro Valenciano	3	2	0	1	10	5	+5	6
3	(Portugal) O.C. Barcelos	3	1	1	1	4	6	−2	4
3	(Angola) Petro de Luanda	3	0	0	3	3	12	−9	0

=== Group C ===
Day	Hour		Score
22 September	12:00	Decatur HC (United States)	1–7	(Italy) ASH Valdagno
	21:30	Reus Deportiu (Spain)	4–1	(Switzerland) RHC Wimmis
23 September	10:30	Decatur HC (United States)	2–1	(Switzerland) RHC Wimmis
	21:30	ASH Valdagno (Italy)	0–2	(Spain) Reus Deportiu
24 September	12:00	RHC Wimmis (Switzerland)	2–6	(Italy) ASH Valdagno
	21:30	Reus Deportiu (Spain)	8–1	(United States) Decatur HC

Pos	Team	Pld	W	D	L	GF	GA	GD	Pts
1	(Spain) Reus Deportiu	3	3	0	0	14	2	+12	9
2	(Italy) ASH Valdagno	3	2	0	1	13	5	+8	6
3	(United States) Decatur HC	3	1	0	2	4	16	−12	3
3	(Switzerland) RHC Wimmis	3	0	0	3	4	12	−8	0

=== Group D ===
Day	Hour		Score
22 September	10:30	Bassano H. 54 (Italy)	6–4	(France) HC Quévert
	18:30	Juventude de Viana (Angola)	3–8	(Portugal) Oliveirense
23 September	09:00	Juventude de Viana (Angola)	3–6	(France) HC Quévert
	20:00	Oliveirense (Portugal)	3–2	(Italy) Bassano H. 54
24 September	10:30	HC Quévert (France)	4–3	(Portugal) Oliveirense
	20:00	Bassano H. 54 (Italy)	8–1	(Angola) Juventude de Viana

Pos	Team	Pld	W	D	L	GF	GA	GD	Pts
1	(Italy) Bassano	3	2	0	1	16	8	+8	6
2	(Portugal) Oliveirense	3	2	0	1	14	9	+5	6
3	(France) HC Quévert	3	2	0	1	14	12	+2	6
3	(Angola) Juventude de Viana	3	0	0	3	7	22	−15	0

== Final phase ==
=== 15-16th place ===
Day	Hour		Score
26 September	10:30	Juventude Viana (Angola)	5–3	(Brazil) SC Recife

=== 13-14th place ===
Day	Hour		Score
26 September	12:00	Petro de Luanda (Angola)	4–5	(Switzerland) RHC Wimmis

=== 11-12th place ===
Day	Hour		Score
27 September	09:30	ERG Iserlohn (Germany)	4–7	(United States) Decatur HC

=== 9-10th place ===
Day	Hour		Score
27 September	11:00	HC Quévert (France)	4–0	(Portugal) O.C. Barcelos

=== 7-8th place ===
Day	Hour		Score
28 September	12:30	Centro Valenciano (Argentina)	4–2	(Argentina) Concepción PC

=== 5-6th place ===
Day	Hour		Score
28 September	15:15	Oliveirense (Portugal)	4–2	(Spain) Liceo La Coruña

=== Quarter finals ===
Day	Hour		Score
26 September	16:30	Liceo La Coruña (Spain)	3–5	(Italy) ASH Valdagno
	18:00	FC Barcelona (Spain)	3–2	(Portugal) Oliveirense
	19:30	Bassano H. 54 (Italy)	5–2	(Argentina) Centro Valenciano
	21:00	Reus Deportiu (Spain)	4–1	(Argentina) Concepción PC

=== Semi finals ===
Day	Hour		Score
27 September	17:00	ASH Valdagno (Italy)	1–2	(Spain) FC Barcelona
	20:00	Reus Deportiu (Spain)	2–1	(Italy) Bassano H. 54

=== Bronze medal game ===
Day	Hour		Score
28 September	16:00	ASH Valdagno (Italy)	1–4	(Italy) Bassano H. 54

=== Final ===
Day	Hour		Score
28 September	17:30	Reus Deportiu (Spain)	1–0	(Spain) FC Barcelona

== Final table ==
Pos	Team	Pld	W	D	L	GF	GA	GD	Pts
1	(Spain) Reus Deportiu	6	6	0	0	22	5	+17	18
2	(Spain) FC Barcelona	6	4	1	1	13	6	+7	13
3	(Italy) Bassano Hockey 54	6	4	0	2	27	14	+13	12
4	(Italy) ASH Valdagno	6	3	0	3	20	14	+6	9
5	(Portugal) Oliveirense	5	3	0	2	20	14	+6	9
6	(Spain) Liceo La Coruña	5	3	0	2	32	14	+18	9
7	(Argentina) Centro Valenciano	5	3	0	2	16	12	+4	9
8	(Argentina) Concepción PC	5	2	0	3	24	15	+9	6
9	(France) HC Quévert	4	3	0	1	18	12	+6	9
10	(Portugal) O.C. Barcelos	4	1	1	2	4	10	−6	4
11	(United States) Decatur HC	4	2	0	2	11	20	−9	6
12	(Germany) ERG Iserlohn	4	1	0	3	12	21	−9	3
13	(Switzerland) RHC Wimmis	4	1	0	3	9	16	−7	3
14	(Angola) Petro de Luanda	4	0	0	4	7	17	−10	0
15	(Angola) Juventude de Viana	4	1	0	3	12	25	−13	3
16	(Brazil) SC Recife	4	0	0	4	6	38	−32	0
