= 2011–12 CERS Cup =

Tournament details
- Dates: 19 November 2011 – 13 May 2012
- Teams: 28 (from 9 associations)

Final positions
- Champions: (Italy) Bassano (1st title)
- Runners-up: (Portugal) Braga

The 2011–12 CERS Cup was the 32nd season of the CERS Cup, Europe's second club roller hockey competition organized by CERH. 28 teams from nine national associations qualified for the competition as a result of their respective national league placing in the previous season. Following a preliminary phase and two knockout rounds, Bassano Hockey 54 won the tournament at its final four, in Bassano del Grappa, Italy on 12 and 13 May 2012.

== Preliminary phase ==
The preliminary phase legs took place on 19 November and 17 December 2011.

Team 1	Agg.	Team 2	1st leg	2nd leg
Weil (Switzerland)	2–20	(Spain) PAS Alcoy	0–9	2–11
Vendrell (Spain)	7–4	(Italy) Sarzana	3–2	4–2
Wimmis (Switzerland)	4–13	(Italy) Forte dei Marmi	3–5	1–8
Wolfurt (Austria)	6–18	(Germany) Walsum	3–8	3–10
Dornbirn (Austria)	11–7	(England) Herne Bay United	8–3	3–4
Bassano (Italy)	16–4	(Germany) Remscheid	8–1	8–3)
Molfetta (Italy)	6–7	(France) La Vendéenne	3–2	3–5
Seregno (Italy)	5–8	(France) Mérignac	3–2	2–6
Blanes (Spain)	7–0	(France) Saint Omer	3–0	4–0
Biasca (Switzerland)	11–5	(Germany) Düsseldorf-Nord	4–1	7–4
RHC Friedlingen (Germany)	14–9	(Switzerland) Uttigen	6–5	8–4
Diessbach (Switzerland)	6–15	(France) Quévert	3–8	4–7

== Knockout stage ==
The knockout stage consisted in double-legged series for the round of 16 and the quarterfinals, where the four winners would join the Final Four in Vendrell, Spain.

Round of 16; 21 January – 18 February
(France) Quévert	4	3	7
(Germany) Friedlingen	2	7	9
(France) Saint-Brieuc	3	2	5
(Portugal) Braga	3	10	13
(Italy) Forte dei Marmi	5	1	6
(Spain) Vendrell	4	4	8
(France) Mérignac	5	3	8
(Spain) PAS Alcoy	7	5	12
(Spain) Blanes	9	2	11
(Switzerland) Biasca	1	2	3
(Austria) Dornbirn	0	0	0
(Spain) Vilanova	8	14	22
(Germany) Walsum	5	2	7
(Italy) Bassano	8	10	18
(France) La Vendéenne	2	1	3
(Spain) Igualada	3	1	4

Quarterfinals; 17 March – 14 April
(Germany) Friedlingen	4	2	6
(Portugal) Braga	7	2	9
(Spain) Vendrell	5	1	6
(Spain) PAS Alcoy	4	4	8
(Spain) Blanes	3	2	5
(Spain) Vilanova	4	4	8
(Italy) Bassano	2	3	5
(Spain) Igualada	1	2	3

Semifinals; 12 May
(Portugal) Braga (p)	4 (3)
(Spain) PAS Alcoy	4 (2)
(Italy) Bassano (g.g.)	3
(Spain) Vilanova	2

Final; 13 May
(Portugal) Braga	2 (3)
(Italy) Bassano (p)	2 (5)

== Final four ==
=== Semifinals ===
12 May
18:00

HC Braga	5 – 4 (a.e.t.)	Enrile-PAS-Alcoy
Nunes (3); Magalhães (1) "Fellini" (1)	Report	Baieli (3); Martínez (1)

PalaBassano
Referee: Gianni Fermi (ITA), Ulien Nicolle (FRA)

12 May
20:00

Bassano Hockey	3 – 2 (a.e.t.)	Vilanova
Nicolas (2); Ambrosio (1)	Report	Gil (2)

PalaBassano
Referee: Xavier Jacquart(FRA), Luis Peixoto (POR)

=== Final ===
13 May
17:30 UTC+2

HC Braga	3 – 5	Bassano Hockey 54
Nunes (2); Costa (1)	Report	Ambrosio (2); Nicolas (1); Peripolli (1); Lanaro (1)

PalaBassano
Referee: Xavier Jacquart, Julien Nicolle (France)

2012 CERS Cup winners
(Italy)
Bassano Hockey 54
First title

== See also ==
- 2011–12 CERH European League
- 2011–12 CERH Women's European League

=== International ===
- Roller Hockey links worldwide
- Mundook-World Roller Hockey
- Hoqueipatins.com - Results from Roller Hockey
