= Lisandra Salvador =

Angolan handball player

Personal information
- Full name: Lisandra Isabel Joaquim Salvador
- Nationality: Angolan
- Born: 6 August 1990 (age 36)
- Height: 1.72 m (5 ft 8 in)

Sport
- Sport: Handball
- Position: Leftback
- Current club: Marinha de Guerra
- Number: 18
National team
Years	Team	Apps	(Gls)
–	Angola	12	(8)

Lisandra Isabel Joaquim Salvador (born 6 August 1990) is an Angolan handball player. She plays for the club Primeiro de Agosto, and on the Angolan national team. She represented Angola at the 2013 World Women's Handball Championship in Serbia.
