= G.D. Juventude de Viana (roller hockey) =

- Full name: G.D. Juventude de Viana
- Short name: Juventude de Viana
- Arena: Pavilhão da Cidadela, Luanda
- Capacity: 1,500
- League: 3×Angola League; 6×Angola Cup; 2×Angola Super Cup; 5×The President's Cup; 1×African Champions League
Home	Away

Grupo Desportivo Juventude de Viana, formerly Enama de Viana, is an Angolan sports club based in the municipality of Viana, Luanda. The club has a men's roller hockey team competing at the local level, at the Luanda Provincial Roller Hockey Championship and at the Angolan Roller Hockey Championship. Additionally, the team has been a regular contestant at the African Roller Hockey Clubs Championship.

In the 2006 world roller hockey club championship held in Luanda, Angola, the club ranked 10th, among 12 teams whereas in 2008, in Reus, Spain, the club ranked 15th, among 16 teams.

Juventude de Viana won the second edition of the African Roller Hockey Club Championship held in 2008 in Luanda, Angola whereas in the following edition, in 2010, in Pretoria, South Africa, it ranked second.

== Honours ==
- Angola Hockey League :
  - Winner (4): 2006, 2007, 2008, 2011
  - Runner Up (5) : 2004, 2005, 2010, 2012, 2013
- Angola Cup :
  - Winner (7): 2003, 2007, 2008, 2009, 2010, 2011, 2013
  - Runner Up (4) : 2004, 2005, 2006, 2012
- Angola Super Cup :
  - Winner (4): 2005, 2008, 2011, 2014
  - Runner Up (1) : 2010
- The President's Cup :
  - Winner (5): 1994, 2004, 2005, 2007, 2010
  - Runner Up (0) :
- African Champions League :
  - Winner (1): 2008
  - Runner Up (1) : 2010

== Managers ==
(Portugal)	José Querido
(Angola)	Nelson Amado Sony		-	Jan 2006
(Angola)	Inácio Olim	Jan 2006	-
(Angola)	António Victor Duke

== Players ==
Juventude de Viana hockey players 2013–2014

Nat	Name	Nick	A	P	F. Fallé	
Nat	Name	Nick	A	P	2013	2014
Nat	Name	Nick	A	P	–	–
(Angola)	Anderson Silva	Nery	FW	21	9	⋅
(Angola)	António Adão	Toy Adão	D/M	33	2	2
(Angola)	Argentino Agostinho	Tino	D/M		⋅	5
(Angola)		Carlitos	D/M		4	⋅
(Angola)	Filipe Bernardino		FW		8	8
(Angola)	João Cabral	Jú	D/M		⋅	4
(Angola)	João Vieira	Joe	FW	37	6	6
(Angola)	Joel Coelho		GK		⋅	10
(Angola)		Manguxi	D/M		5	⋅
(Angola)	Mário Almeida		GK		1	1
(Angola)	Rui André		FW	32	7	7
(Angola)	Rui Miguel		D/M	32	3	3
(Angola)	Vidigal		GK		10	⋅

== See also ==
- Juventude de Viana Basketball
