= Liliana Paixão =

Angolan handball player (born 1988)

Personal information
- Full name: Liliana Alexandra Pascoal da Paixão
- Nationality: Angolan
- Born: 3 March 1988 (age 38)
- Height: 1.82 m (6 ft 0 in)

Sport
- Sport: Handball
- Position: Right back
- Current club: Marinha de Guerra
- Number: 15
National team
Years	Team	Apps	(Gls)
–	Angola	0	(0)

Liliana Alexandra Pascoal da Paixão (born 3 March 1988) is an Angolan handball player. She plays for the club Marinha de Guerra, in the Angolan handball league and on the Angolan national team. She represented Angola at the 2013 World Women's Handball Championship in Serbia.
