= African Roller Hockey Club Championship =

Roller hockey Clubs Championship in Africa

- Sport: Roller Hockey
- Founded: 1991
- No. of teams: 6
- Most recent champion: Académica de Luanda

The Roller Hockey African Club Championship was the biggest Roller hockey Clubs Championship in Africa.

== Participated Teams in the last Championship ==
From South Africa: ACPP Pretoria and União Joanesburgo, from Angola: Juventude de Viana and Petro de Luanda, from Mozambique: Ferroviário de Maputo and Desportivo de Maputo, from Egypt: El Dakhlia Roller Hockey

=== List of Winners ===
Year	Host city	Champion
2010	(South Africa) Pretoria	(Angola) Académica de Luanda
2008	(Angola) Luanda	(Angola) Juventude de Viana
1991	(Egypt) Cairo	(Mozambique) Estrela Vermelha

=== Number of Championships by team ===
Team	Championships
Académica de Luanda	1
Juventude de Viana	1
Estrela Vermelha	1
TOTAL	3
