= G.D. Interclube (handball) =

- Full name: G.D. Interclube
- Short name: Interclube
- Founded: February 28, 1976 (49 years ago)
- Arena: Campo do Gama; Pavilhão da Cidadela, Luanda
- Capacity: 1,500
- President: Alves Simões 08/2011 -
- Head coach: Alexandre Machado
- League: 1× Angola League; 5× Angola Cup; 4× Angola Super Cup
- Club colours
Home	Away

G.D. Interclube (handball) is a men's handball team from Angola. The club competes at the Luanda Provincial Handball Championship and at the Angola National Handball Championship as well as at continental level, at the annual African Handball Champions League competitions.

== Honours ==
- National Championship:
  - Winner (1): 1989
  - Runner Up (4) : 2010, 2011, 2013, 2015
- Angola Cup :
  - Winner (5): 2010, 2011, 2012, 2014, 2016
  - Runner Up (1) : 2013
- Angola Super Cup :
  - Winner (4): 2011, 2013, 2014, 2015
  - Runner Up (3) : 2010, 2012, 2016
- African Cup Winner's Cup :
  - Winner (0):
  - Runner Up (1) : 2010

== Squad ==
Interclube Handball squad
**Goalkeepers**

 01  Edson Faustino Colita 35-177-79

- 79 (Angola) Edson Esteves 24-179-65

 12  Custódio Gouveia Bana 196-116
 16  Julião Gaspar Vermelhinho 26-190-98

**Wingers**

 04  Eugénio Carlos Paulo-R
 05  André Fonseca Zeca-R
 09  Elias António-L
 13  Nestor Kinanga Simão 28-R
 17  João Mufinda
 23  Vanilson António Djanini 26-L

**Back players**

 02  Yuri Fernandes 32-184-77
 03  Fankoua William 33-L-180-102
 07  Edgar Abreu Belú 24-C-180-80
 10  Mayomona Panzo NetinhoC
 11  Liliano Pedro Lilí 22-190-77
 19  Joaquim Raúl 
 21  Adelino Pestana Amarelo 24-R-190-88
 22  Michael Chuala L-188-97

**Line players**

 03  Fernando Teca 195
 08  António Costa Malanje 31-192
 18  Aguinaldo Toco Tati
 20  Yaroslav Aguiar Jaro (C) 31-200

**Technical staff**

      Alexandre Machado  Head Coach
      António Balaka Physician
      Francisco Boa Physio
      Pedro Santana Stats
      Euclides Quissanga Gen manager

- Players in **bold** indicate starting lineup

== Players ==
G.D. Interclube handball players

=== 2011–2018 ===
Nat	#	Name	A	P	H	W	–			T. Costa		A.M.	–	–
Nat	#	Name	A	P	H	W	2011	2012	2013	2014	2015	2016	2017	2018
Nat	#	Name	A	P	H	W	–	–	2	–	2	2		
(Angola)	22	Adelino Pestana Amarelo	26	B	1.90	88	⋅	⋅	⋅	22	22	22	⋅	2018
(Angola)	⋅	Edson Esteves Edson		P			⋅	⋅	⋅	18	18	18	⋅	⋅
(Angola)	⋅	Alberto Ngongo Caty		B	1.90	76	⋅	⋅	⋅	14	⋅	⋅	⋅	⋅
(Angola)	⋅	Anderson Silva		B			⋅	⋅	⋅	⋅	10	10	⋅	⋅
(Angola)	⋅	André Fonseca Zeca		W			⋅	⋅	⋅	5	5	5	⋅	⋅
(Angola)	⋅	António Costa Malanje	31	P	1.92		⋅	⋅	⋅	⋅	19	8	8	⋅
(Angola)	12	Custódio Gouveia Bana		GK	1.96	116	⋅	⋅	⋅	9	12	12	⋅	⋅
(Angola)	⋅	Edgar Abreu Belú	24	B	1.80	80	⋅	⋅	⋅	⋅	14	7	⋅	⋅
(Angola)	⋅	Edson Faustino Colita	35	GK	1.77	79	⋅	⋅	⋅	1	1	1	⋅	⋅
(Angola)	⋅	Elias António		W			⋅	⋅	⋅	–	9	9	⋅	⋅
(Angola)	⋅	Eugénio Carlos Paulo		W			⋅	⋅	⋅	4	4	4	⋅	⋅
(Cameroon)	3	Fankoua William	35	B	1.80	102	⋅	⋅	⋅	⋅	⋅	3	3	2018
(Angola)	⋅	Fernando Teca		P	1.95		⋅	⋅	⋅	3	3	⋅	⋅	⋅
(Angola)	⋅	Gaspar Kainda		GK			⋅	⋅	⋅	12	⋅	⋅	⋅	⋅
(Angola)	⋅	João Mufinda		W			⋅	⋅	⋅	⋅	17	17	⋅	⋅
(Angola)	⋅	Joaquim Raúl		B			⋅	⋅	⋅	⋅	⋅	19	⋅	⋅
(Angola)	⋅	Julião Gaspar Vermelhinho	26	GK	1.90	98	⋅	⋅	⋅	⋅	16	16	⋅	⋅
(Angola)	⋅	Liliano Pedro Lilí	22	B	1.90	77	⋅	⋅	⋅	11	11	11	⋅	⋅
(Angola)	⋅	Mayomona Panzo Netinho		B			⋅	⋅	⋅	⋅	⋅	→	10	⋅
(Cameroon)	21	Michael Chuala		B	1.88	97	⋅	⋅	⋅	21	21	21	21	2018
(Angola)	⋅	Nelson Varela		B	1.83		⋅	⋅	⋅	25	⋅	⋅	⋅	⋅
(Angola)	13	Nestor Kinanga Simão	30	W			⋅	⋅	⋅	10	13	13	13	2018
(Angola)	⋅	Sérgio Lopes		B	1.85	84	⋅	⋅	⋅	17	→	⋅	⋅	⋅
(Gabon)	⋅	Tomás Emery		B			⋅	⋅	⋅	7	⋅	⋅	⋅	⋅
(Angola)	⋅	Tomas Landa Tontom		W			⋅	⋅	⋅	–	⋅	⋅	⋅	⋅
(Angola)	23	Vanilson António Djanini	26	W			⋅	⋅	⋅	6	⋅	2016	⋅	⋅
(Angola)	20	Yaroslav Aguiar Jaro	33	P			⋅	⋅	⋅	20	20	20	20	2018
(Angola)	⋅	Yuri Fernandes	32	B	1.84	77	⋅	⋅	⋅	2	2	2	⋅	⋅

== Manager history ==
- (Ukraine) Victor Tchikoulaev – 2017, 2018
- (Angola) Alexandre Machado Careca – 2016
- (Angola) Tony Costa – 2014, 2015
- (Angola) Luís Chaves – 2010

== See also ==
- Interclube Football
- Interclube Basketball
- Angolan Handball Federation
