= 2006 rink hockey World Club Championship =

Tournament details
- Host country: Angola
- City: Luanda
- Dates: 24 September 2006–30 September 2006
- Teams: 12

Final positions
- Champions: (Italy) Bassano Hockey 54 (1st title)
- Runner-up: (Spain) Reus Deportiu
- Third place: (Portugal) SL Benfica

Tournament statistics
- Matches played: 30
- Goals scored: 221 (7.37 per match)
- Top scorer(s): Luís Viana (13 goals)

The rink hockey World Club Championship is a worldwide competition with the best rink hockey teams. This competition was held for the first time in 2006, in Luanda, Angola.

The budget for the competition in 2006 was 1 million US dollars. The winner earned a 5000 euro prize, the 2nd-placed, 2500 euro and the 3rd-placed 1250. Every team received a trophy and the 4th to the 12th placed teams equal ones. The top scorer was Luís Viana, a Portuguese player of Bassano, who scored 13 goals.

== Format ==
12 teams from 8 different countries participate. The teams are divided into 4 groups of three teams each. The top teams of each group will advance to the final stage into a round-robin group to decide which team is the champion. The teams that didn't advance to the final stage will play knockout rounds to determine the 5th to 12th placed teams.

== Teams participating ==
Africa:

(Angola) Juventude de Viana
(Angola) Petro Atlético
(Mozambique) Desportivo de Maputo

Europe:

(Portugal) FC Porto
(Portugal) SL Benfica
(Italy) Bassano
(Italy) Lodi
(Spain) Reus

South America:

(Brazil) Sertãozinho
(Argentina) Concepción
(Argentina) Olimpia de San Juan
(Chile) Estudantil S. Miguel

== Group stage ==
All times West Africa Time / Western European Time (only during DST)

=== Group A ===
Pos	Team	Pld	W	D	L	GF	GA	GD	Pts
1	(Italy) Bassano	2	1	1	0	21	3	+18	4
2	(Argentina) Concepción	2	1	1	0	19	4	+15	4
3	(Mozambique) Maputo	2	0	0	2	7	40	−33	0

Day	Hour		Score			Report
24 September	18:30	Bassano	0	0	Concepción
27 September	17:00	Maputo	3	21	Bassano
26 September	21:30	Concepcíon	19	4	Maputo

=== Group B ===
Pos	Team	Pld	W	D	L	GF	GA	GD	Pts
1	(Portugal) FC Porto	2	2	0	0	12	3	+9	6
2	(Argentina) Olímpia de San Juan	2	1	0	1	6	9	−3	3
3	(Angola) Juventude de Viana	2	0	0	2	4	10	−6	0

Day	Hour		Score			Report
24 September	21:30	Porto	5	2	Viana
25 September	17:00	Porto	7	1	Olimpia
26 September	18:30	Viana	2	5	Olimpia

=== Group C ===
Pos	Team	Pld	W	D	L	GF	GA	GD	Pts
1	(Spain) Reus	2	2	0	0	14	3	+11	6
2	(Italy) Lodi	2	1	0	1	6	7	−1	3
3	(Chile) Estudantil	2	0	0	2	3	13	−10	0

Day	Hour		Score			Report
24 September	20:00	Reus	9	1	Estudantil
25 September	18:30	Lodi	4	2	Estudantil
26 September	20:00	Reus	5	2	Lodi

=== Group D ===
Pos	Team	Pld	W	D	L	GF	GA	GD	Pts
1	(Portugal) Benfica	2	2	0	0	11	1	+10	6
2	(Angola) Petro	2	0	1	1	2	3	−1	1
3	(Brazil) Sertãozinho	2	0	1	1	3	12	−9	1

Day	Hour		Score			Report
24 September	17:00	Benfica	1	0	Petro
25 September	20:00	Petro	2	2	Sertãozinho
26 September	17:00	Benfica	10	1	Sertãozinho

== Final phase ==
Pos	Team	Pld	W	D	L	GF	GA	GD	Pts
1	(Italy) Bassano	3	3	0	0	10	6	+4	9
2	(Spain) Reus	3	2	0	1	11	4	+7	6
3	(Portugal) SL Benfica	3	0	1	2	4	7	−3	1
4	(Portugal) FC Porto	3	0	1	2	3	11	−8	1

Day	Hour		Score			Report
28 September	20:00	Bassano	4	2	Porto
28 September	21:30	Benfica	1	3	Reus
29 September	20:00	Porto	1	1	Benfica
29 September	21:30	Reus	2	3	Bassano
30 September	18:00	Bassano	3	2	Benfica
30 September	19:30	Porto	0	6	Reus

== 5th to 12th places ==
=== First round ===
Day	Hour		Score			Report
28 September	10:30	Maputo	3	6	Olimpia
28 September	12:00	Concepción (Penalties)	2(3)	2(0)	Viana
28 September	17:00	Estudantil (Penalties)	2(2)	2(1)	Petro
28 September	18:30	Lodi	4	1	Sertãozinho

=== Second round ===
Winners of the first round
Day	Hour		Score			Report
29 September	16:00	Estudantil	0	3	Olimpia
29 September	17:30	Lodi (Penalties)	2(3)	2(2)	Concepción

Losers of the first round
Day	Hour		Score			Report
29 September	10:30	Petro	6	0	Maputo
29 September	12:00	Sertãozinho	2	5	Viana

=== Third round ===
5th and 6th places
Day	Hour		Score			Report
30 September	16:30	Olimpia	3	2	Lodi

7th and 8th places
Day	Hour		Score			Report
30 September	15:00	Estudantil	3	7	Concepción

9th and 10th places
Day	Hour		Score			Report
30 September	12:00	Petro	3	2	Viana

11th and 12th places
Day	Hour		Score			Report
30 September	10:30	Maputo	5	7	Sertãozinho

== Final table ==
Pos	Team	Pld	W	D	L	GF	GA	GD	Pts
1	(Italy) Bassano	5	4	1	0	31	9	+22	13
2	(Spain) Reus	5	4	0	1	25	7	+18	12
3	(Portugal) SL Benfica	5	2	1	2	15	8	+7	7
4	(Portugal) FC Porto	5	2	1	2	15	14	+1	7
5	(Argentina) Olimpia	5	4	0	1	18	14	+4	12
6	(Italy) Lodi	5	2	1	2	14	13	+1	7
7	(Argentina) Concepción	5	2	3	0	30	11	+19	9
8	(Chile) Estudantil	5	0	1	4	10	25	−15	1
9	(Angola) Petro	5	2	2	1	13	7	+6	8
10	(Angola) J. de Viana	5	1	1	3	11	17	−6	4
11	(Brazil) Sertãozinho	5	1	1	3	13	26	−13	4
12	(Mozambique) Maputo	5	0	0	5	15	59	−44	0
