= C.D. Académica de Luanda (roller hockey) =

Angolan roller hockey sports team

- Full name: C.D. Académica de Luanda
- Short name: Académica de Luanda
- Arena: Pavilhão Dreamspace, Viana, Luanda
- Capacity: 6,500
- President: José Adão
- Head coach: Alberto Jorge
- League: 5×Angola League; 1×Angola Cup; 5×Angola Super Cup; 1×African Champions League 1×The President's Cup
Home	Away

Clube Desportivo Académica de Luanda is an Angolan sports club from Luanda. The club's roller hockey team competes at the local level, at the Luanda Provincial Roller Hockey Championship and at the Angolan Roller Hockey Championship. Additionally, the team has been a regular contestant at the African Roller Hockey Club Championships.

Académica de Luanda is the current African club champion, after winning the third edition of the African Roller Hockey Club Championship, in 2010 in Pretoria, South Africa.

== Honours ==
- Angola Hockey League :
  - Winner (5): 2009, 2010, 2012, 2013, 2014
  - Runner Up (0) :
- Angola Cup:
  - Winner (3): 2014, 2015, 2016
  - Runner Up (0) :
- Angola Super Cup:
  - Winner (5): 2010, 2013, 2015, 2016, 2017
  - Runner Up (1) : 2014
- The President's Cup:
  - Winner (1): 2014
  - Runner Up (0) :
- African Champions League:
  - Winner (1): 2010
  - Runner Up (0) :

== Squad ==
Updated as of July 2016

Académica de Luanda Roller Hockey squad
Defenders / Midfielders

 02  Adilson Diogo Pi 17
 03  Francisco Eduardo Chiquinho 
 04  Mauro Abreu
 06  Erivaldo Domingos Ery 

Forwarders

 05  Márcio Fernandes 29
 07  Pedro Sarmento Bebo
 08  Denilson Manuel
 09  Martin Payero 38

Goalkeepers

 10  Pedro Manuel Watangua
 23  Mário Almeida

Technical staff

      Jurandyr da Silva Didí Head Coach 
      Mário Malungo  Assistant Coach

== Players ==
Académica de Luanda hockey players 2012–2016

Nat	#	Name	Nick	A	P	Jurandyr da Silva Didí					
Nat	#	Name	Nick	A	P	2012	2013	2014	2015	2016	2017
Nat	#	Name	Nick	A	P	–	–	–	–	–	–
(Angola)	⋅	Adilson Diogo	Pi	17	D/M	2012	⋅	2	2	2	⋅
(Angola)	⋅	Alberto João	Beto		GK	⋅	1	1	1	⋅	⋅
(Angola)	⋅	Alexandre Direito	–		D/M	2012	⋅	⋅	⋅	⋅	⋅
(Angola)	⋅	Anacleto Silva	Kirro	36	FW	2012	⋅	⋅	⋅	⋅	⋅
(Angola)	⋅	André Centeno	–	27	FW	2012	2	⋅	⋅	⋅	⋅
(Angola)	⋅	Argentino Agostinho	Tino	29	FW	⋅	⋅	⋅	8	⋅	⋅
(Angola)	⋅	Denilson Manuel	–		FW	2012	⋅	6	9	8	⋅
(Angola)	⋅	Erivaldo Domingos	Ery		D/M	⋅	⋅	⋅	⋅	6	⋅
(Angola)	⋅	Francisco Eduardo	Chiquinho		D/M	⋅	6	3	3	3	⋅
(Angola)	⋅	Joelson da Mata	Nilson		D/M	⋅	5	5	5	⋅	⋅
(Angola)	⋅	José Campos	Ziga		D/M	⋅	3	⋅	⋅	⋅	⋅
(Brazil)	⋅	Jurandyr da Silva	Didí	45	FW	2012	7	7	7	⋅	⋅
(Argentina)	⋅	Leonardo Torres	Tomba	40	FW	⋅	4	⋅	⋅	⋅	⋅
(Angola)	⋅	Luís Mussunda	Lelas		D/M	⋅	⋅	4	4	⋅	⋅
(Angola)	⋅	Márcio Fernandes	–	29	FW	⋅	⋅	⋅	⋅	5	⋅
(Angola)	⋅	Mário Almeida	–		GK	⋅	⋅	⋅	10	23	⋅
(Argentina)	⋅	Martin Maturano	–	28	D/M	⋅	8	8	⋅	⋅	⋅
(Angola)	⋅	Martin Payero	–	37	D/M	2012	9	9	⋅	9	⋅
(Angola)	⋅	Mauro Abreu	–		D/M	2012	⋅	⋅	⋅	4	⋅
(Angola)	⋅	Pedro Manuel	Watangua		GK	2012	⋅	10	⋅	10	⋅
(Angola)	⋅	Pedro Sarmento	Bebo		FW	⋅	⋅	⋅	⋅	7	⋅
(Angola)	⋅	Tiago Sousa	–	36	GK	2012	10	⋅	⋅	⋅	⋅

== Managers ==
- (Angola) Orlando Graça
