= Angolan Roller Hockey League =

- Sport: Roller Hockey
- Founded: 1978
- No. of teams: 8
- Country: Angola
- Most recent champion: Primeiro de Agosto (2015)
- Website: Federação Angolana de Hóquei Patins

The Angolan Roller Hockey Championship is the top tier Roller Hockey Clubs Championship in Angola.

== Summary ==
Year	City	Date	Final			Third-place game		
Year	City	Date	Champion	Score	Second Place	Third Place	Score	Fourth Place
2001	Lobito	Nov 01–06 00	Petro de Luanda	^{round robin}	G.D. Banca	C.P.P.L.	^{round robin}	Sporting do Bié
2002	Luanda	Feb 04–22	Petro de Luanda	x–x 1–2 2–1	G.D. Banca	C.P.P.L.		Sporting do Bié
2003	Luanda	Jun 17–26	Petro de Luanda	4–3 4–2	G.D. Banca	Enama de Viana	7–1	C.P.P.L.
2004	Luanda	Oct 08–20	Petro de Luanda	5–4 3–4 6–5 4–2	Enama de Viana	G.D. Banca	9–3 14–2	Sporting do Bié
2005	Luanda	Sep 23–Oct 11	Petro de Luanda	2–1 4–3 3–1	Juventude de Viana	G.D. Banca	x–x x–x 5–1	Sporting do Bié
2006	Luanda	Oct 21–Nov 03	Juventude de Viana	2–3 4–2 2–0 5–1	Petro de Luanda	G.D. Banca	4–2	Núcleo de Luanda
2007	Benguela	Oct 20–30	Juventude de Viana	2–1	Petro de Luanda	Académica de Luanda		G.D. Banca
2008	Luanda	Oct 17–28	Juventude de Viana	2–1 3–2 5–2	Petro de Luanda	Académica de Luanda	2–0 4–5 5–3	G.D. Banca
2009	Luanda	Oct 16–28	Académica de Luanda	4–2 6–4 7–4	Petro de Luanda	Juventude de Viana	16–3 3–2	HC Vila Alice
2010	Luanda	Oct 12–27	Académica de Luanda	2–1 4–3 ^{round robin}	Juventude de Viana	Petro de Luanda	5–4 3–1 ^{round robin}	Primeiro de Agosto
2011	Luanda	Jan 21–Feb 07	Juventude de Viana	1–3 4–2 3–1 2–1	Petro de Luanda	Académica de Luanda	3–1 x–x	Primeiro de Agosto
2012	Sumbe	Sep 18–Oct 05	Académica de Luanda	5–2 4–1 2–0	Juventude de Viana	Petro de Luanda	5–3 3–1	Kabuscorp
2013	Lobito	Nov 20–26	Académica de Luanda	3–6 6–0 2–3 7–4 3–2	Juventude de Viana	Primeiro de Agosto	5–4	Petro de Luanda
2014	Luanda	Nov 06–Dec 01	Académica de Luanda	7–1 2–4 3–5 3–2 6–1	Primeiro de Agosto	Juventude de Viana	2–0 3–7 5–3	Petro de Luanda
2015	Lobito	Nov 05–23	Primeiro de Agosto	4–2 1–0 2–0	Académica de Luanda	Sagrado Coração	2–5 3–2 4–3	Petro de Luanda
2016	Luanda	Nov 04–	Primeiro de Agosto	3–5 4–3 5–2 5–1	Académica de Luanda	Marinha de Guerra	2–1	Sagrado Coração

^round robin In 2001 and 2010, a double round-robin final four playoff was organized.

== Participation details ==
Clubs
Clubs	2001	2002	2003	2004	2005	2006	2007	2008	2009	2010	2011	2012	2013	2014	2015	2016	
	4	5	5	4	5	5	6	8	6	7	8	8	x	6	8	8	
Académica de Luanda	⋅	⋅	⋅	⋅	⋅	⋅	3 2007	3 2008	1 2009	1 2010	3 2011	1 2012	1 2013	1 2014	2 2015	2 2016	8
Académica do Lobito	⋅	⋅	⋅	⋅	⋅	⋅	⋅	⋅	⋅	⋅	⋅	⋅	⋅	⋅	7	8	1
ASA	⋅	⋅	⋅	⋅	⋅	⋅	⋅	⋅	⋅	5	⋅	⋅	⋅	⋅	⋅	⋅	x
Benfica de Luanda	⋅	⋅	⋅	⋅	⋅	⋅	⋅	⋅	5	6	5	⋅	⋅	⋅	⋅	⋅	5
C.P.P.L.	3 2001	3 2002	4	⋅	⋅	⋅	⋅	⋅	⋅	⋅	⋅	⋅	⋅	⋅	⋅	⋅	x
CODEX	⋅	⋅	⋅	⋅	⋅	⋅	⋅	⋅	⋅	⋅	⋅	⋅	⋅	6	6	⋅	2
Enama de Viana	⋅	5	3 2003	2 2004	⋅	⋅	⋅	⋅	⋅	⋅	⋅	⋅	⋅	⋅	⋅	⋅	x
Estado Maior do Exército	⋅	⋅	⋅	⋅	⋅	⋅	⋅	⋅	⋅	⋅	⋅	⋅	⋅	⋅	5	6	1
Exército	⋅	⋅	⋅	⋅	⋅	⋅	⋅	⋅	⋅	⋅	⋅	⋅	⋅	⋅	⋅	7	1
G.D. Banca	2 2001	2 2002	2 2003	3 2004	3 2005	3 2006	4	4	⋅	⋅	⋅	⋅	⋅	⋅	⋅	⋅	x
HC do Lobito	⋅	⋅	⋅	⋅	⋅	5	6	⋅	6	7	7	⋅	⋅	⋅	⋅	⋅	x
HC da Vila Alice	⋅	⋅	⋅	⋅	⋅	⋅	⋅	⋅	4	⋅	⋅	⋅	⋅	⋅	⋅	⋅	x
Hóquei 2000	⋅	⋅	⋅	⋅	⋅	⋅	⋅	⋅	⋅	⋅	6	⋅	⋅	⋅	8	⋅	x
Juventude de Viana	⋅	⋅	⋅	⋅	2 2005	1 2006	1 2007	1 2008	3 2009	2 2010	1 2011	2 2012	2 2013	3 2014	⋅	⋅	10
Kabuscorp	⋅	⋅	⋅	⋅	⋅	⋅	⋅	⋅	⋅	⋅	8	4	⋅	⋅	⋅	⋅	x
Marinha de Guerra	⋅	⋅	⋅	⋅	⋅	⋅	⋅	⋅	⋅	⋅	⋅	⋅	⋅	⋅	⋅	3 2016	1
Núcleo de Luanda	⋅	⋅	⋅	⋅	⋅	4	5	⋅	⋅	⋅	⋅	⋅	⋅	⋅	⋅	⋅	x
Petro de Luanda	1 2001	1 2002	1 2003	1 2004	1 2005	2 2006	2 2007	2 2008	2 2009	3 2010	2 2011	3 2012	4	4	4	5	x
Primeiro de Agosto	⋅	⋅	⋅	⋅	⋅	⋅	⋅	⋅	⋅	4	4	⋅	3 2013	2 2014	1 2015	1 2016	x
Sagrado Coração de Jesus	⋅	⋅	⋅	⋅	⋅	⋅	⋅	⋅	⋅	⋅	⋅	⋅	⋅	5	3 2015	4	x
Sporting do Bié	4	4	5	4	4	⋅	⋅	⋅	⋅	⋅	⋅	⋅	⋅	⋅	⋅	⋅	x
União da Catumbela	⋅	⋅	⋅	⋅	5	⋅	⋅	⋅	⋅	⋅	⋅	⋅	⋅	⋅	⋅	⋅	x
# Teams	4	5	5	4	5	5	6	8	6	7	8	8	⋅	6	8	8	x

== List of Winners ==
Year	Champion
1999	Petro de Luanda
1998	Petro de Luanda
1997	ENAMA de Viana
1996	
1995	
1994	Petro de Luanda
1993	
1992	ENAMA de Viana
1988	Primeiro de Agosto
1978	Atlético de Luanda

Year	Champion
2009	Académica de Luanda
2008	Juventude de Viana
2007	Juventude de Viana
2006	Juventude de Viana
2005	Petro de Luanda
2004	Petro de Luanda
2003	Petro de Luanda
2002	Petro de Luanda
2001	Petro de Luanda
2000	Petro de Luanda

Year	Champion
2016	Primeiro de Agosto
2015	Primeiro de Agosto
2014	Académica de Luanda
2013	Académica de Luanda
2012	Académica de Luanda
2011	Juventude de Viana
2010	Académica de Luanda

=== Number of Championships by team ===
Team	Titles
Petro de Luanda	9
Académica de Luanda	5
Juventude de Viana	2
ENAMA de Viana	2
Primeiro de Agosto	2
Atlético de Luanda	1
TOTAL	20

== Schedule and results ==
2010 Angolan Roller Hockey League Final Four

	ACA	JUV	PET	PRI	Rec.
Académica de Luanda		2–1; 25 Oct (4)	5–4; 26 Oct (5)	13–1; 27 Oct (6)	–
Juventude de Viana	3–4; 21 Oct (1)		7–3; 27 Oct (6)	6–1; 26 Oct (5)	–
Petro de Luanda	3–8; 22 Oct (2)	1–5; 23 Oct (3)		3–1; 25 Oct (4)	–
Primeiro de Agosto	2–6; 23 Oct (3)	4–6; 22 Oct (2)	4–5; 21 Oct (1)		–
Record	–	–	–	–	

* Note: Numbers in brackets indicate round number

Pos	Team	M	W	L	GF	GA	Diff	Pts
1	Académica de Luanda	6	6	0	38	14	+24	12
2	Juventude de Viana	6	4	2	28	15	+13	8
3	Petro de Luanda	6	2	4	19	30	-11	4
4	Primeiro de Agosto	6	0	6	13	39	-26	0
