= Supertaça de Angola (handball) =

Annual handball competition in Africa

- Current season, competition or edition: 2017 Angola Handball Super Cup
- Sport: Handball
- Founded: 2007
- Continent: CAHB (Africa)
- Most recent champions: Interclube (M) (2017); Petro de Luanda (W) (2017)
- Most titles: Interclube (M) (4 titles); Petro de Luanda (W) (8 titles)

The Angolan Handball SuperCup a.k.a. Supertaça Francisco de Almeida is an annual handball competition between the winners of the previous year's league champion and cup. In case the same team happens to win both the league and the cup, the match will be played between the league winner and the cup runner-up.

The Super Cup match marks the beginning of the handball season, followed by the league and the cup.

== Angola Men's Handball SuperCup ==
Year	City	Date	Score		
2007	Luanda	Apr 04	Desportivo da Banca	25–21	Sporting de Luanda
2008		Sep 21	Primeiro de Agosto	33–22	Sporting de Luanda
2009	Luanda	Mar 07	Primeiro de Agosto	w.o	Misto da Lunda Sul
2010	Luanda	Apr 01	Kabuscorp	27–25	Interclube
2011			Interclube		
2012	Luanda	Apr 05	Primeiro de Agosto	24–20	Interclube
2013	Sumbe	Mar 10	Interclube	23–22	Primeiro de Agosto
2014	Malanje	Apr 05	Interclube	34–30	Primeiro de Agosto
2015	Luanda	Feb 13	Interclube	25–11	Petro Atlético
2016	Luanda	Feb 26	Primeiro de Agosto	31–25	Interclube
2017	Luanda	Feb 18	Interclube	24–20	Primeiro de Agosto
2018	Luanda	Feb 16	Interclube	20–13	Primeiro de Agosto

=== Titles by team (Men) ===
Pos	Team	Won	Years won
1	Interclube	6	2011, 2013, 2014, 2015, 2017, 2018
2	Primeiro de Agosto	4	2008, 2009, 2012, 2016
3	Kabuscorp	1	2010
3	Desportivo da Banca	1	2007

== Angola Women's Handball SuperCup ==
Year	City	Date	Score		
2007	Luanda	Apr 04	ASA	34–29	Petro de Luanda
2008	Luanda	Sep 21	Petro de Luanda	28–25	ASA
2009	Luanda	Mar 07	Petro de Luanda	31–17	ASA
2010			Petro de Luanda		
2011	Luanda	Apr 01	Petro de Luanda	33–31 OT	Primeiro de Agosto
2012	Luanda	Apr 05	Petro de Luanda	32–26	Primeiro de Agosto
2013	Sumbe	Mar 10	Petro de Luanda	30–26	Primeiro de Agosto
2014	Malanje	Apr 05	Petro de Luanda	26–22	Primeiro de Agosto
2015	Luanda	Feb 13	Petro de Luanda	28–26	Primeiro de Agosto
2016	Luanda	Feb 26	Primeiro de Agosto	23–22 OT	Petro de Luanda
2017	Luanda	Feb 18	Petro de Luanda	25–24	Primeiro de Agosto
2018	Luanda	Feb 16	Petro de Luanda	21–19	Primeiro de Agosto

=== Titles by team (Women) ===
Pos	Team	Won	Years won
1	Petro de Luanda	10	2008, 2009, 2010, 2011, 2012, 2013, 2014, 2015, 2017, 2018
2	Primeiro de Agosto	1	2016
2	ASA	1	2007

== See also ==
- Angola Handball Cup
- Angola Men's Handball League
- Angola Women's Handball League
- Supertaça de Angola (football)
- Supertaça de Angola (basketball)
- Supertaça de Angola (roller hockey)
