= Taça de Angola (handball) =

- Current season, competition or edition: 2014 Angola Handball Cup
- Sport: Handball
- Founded: 2006
- Continent: CAHB (Africa)
- Most recent champions: Interclube (M) (2016); Petro Atlético (W) (2016)
- Most titles: Interclube (M) (5titles); Petro Atlético (W) (9 titles)

The Angolan Handball Cup is an annual, nationwide handball competition contested by all eligible handball clubs in the country. The cup, organized by the Angolan Handball Federation is the second most important official handball competition in Angola, following the national league.

The competition is held by knock-out rounds until the final two teams in the men's and women's categories play a single playoff match to determine the winner.

== Angola Men's Handball Cup Finals ==
Year	Venue	Date	Score		
2006	Gama, Luanda	21 Oct 2006	Sporting de Luanda	32-25	Primeiro de Agosto
2007	Cidadela, Luanda	03 Nov 2007	Primeiro de Agosto	23-18	Sporting de Luanda
2008	Cidadela, Luanda	25 Oct 2008	Primeiro de Agosto	38-15	Misto de Saurimo
2010	Cidadela, Luanda	26 Nov 2010	Interclube	23-20	Primeiro de Agosto
2011	Cidadela, Luanda	10 Feb 2012	Interclube	23-20	Primeiro de Agosto
2012	Cidadela, Luanda	25 Oct 2012	Interclube	29-28	Primeiro de Agosto
2013	Cidadela, Luanda	25 Oct 2013	Primeiro de Agosto	25-20	Interclube
2014	Cidadela, Luanda	07 Nov 2014	Interclube	23-22	Petro de Luanda
2015	Cidadela, Luanda	16 Oct 2014	Primeiro de Agosto	29-23	Interclube
2016	Cidadela, Luanda	23 Sep 2016	Interclube	29-28	Primeiro de Agosto
2017	Cidadela, Luanda	28 Jul 2017	Primeiro de Agosto	23-21	Interclube

Men

Team	Won	Years won
Interclube	5	2010, 2011, 2012, 2014, 2016
Primeiro de Agosto	5	2007, 2008, 2013, 2015, 2017
Sporting de Luanda	1	2006

== Angola Women's Handball Cup Finals ==
Year	Venue	Date	Score		
2006	Gama, Luanda	21 Oct 2006	Petro de Luanda	35-28	ASA
2007	Cidadela, Luanda	03 Nov 2007	Petro de Luanda	33-21	ASA
2008	Cidadela, Luanda	25 Oct 2008	Petro de Luanda	23-20	ASA
2010	Cidadela, Luanda	26 Nov 2010	Petro de Luanda	32-21	Primeiro de Agosto
2011	Cidadela, Luanda	10 Feb 2012	Petro de Luanda	35-28	Primeiro de Agosto
2012	Cidadela, Luanda	26 Oct 2012	Petro de Luanda	30-14	Primeiro de Agosto
2013	Cidadela, Luanda	25 Oct 2013	Petro de Luanda	33-29	Primeiro de Agosto
2014	Cidadela, Luanda	07 Nov 2014	Petro de Luanda	28-24	Primeiro de Agosto
2015	Cidadela, Luanda	16 Oct 2015	Primeiro de Agosto	26-21	Petro de Luanda
2016	Cidadela, Luanda	23 Set 2016	Petro de Luanda	24-22	Primeiro de Agosto
2017	Cidadela, Luanda	28 Jul 2017	Petro de Luanda	19-16	Primeiro de Agosto

Women

Team	Won	Years won
Petro de Luanda	10	2006, 2007, 2008, 2010, 2011, 2012, 2013, 2014, 2016, 2017
Primeiro de Agosto	1	2015

== See also ==
- Angola Handball Super Cup
- Angola Men's Handball League
- Angola Women's Handball League
- Taça de Angola (football)
- Taça de Angola (basketball)
- Taça de Angola (roller hockey)
